= List of Oklahoma state agencies =

This is an incomplete list of Oklahoma state agencies. The state agencies make up the machinery of government for the state. All agencies are within one of the three branches of the government of Oklahoma. Pursuant to the provisions of the Executive Branch Reform Act of 1986, all executive branch agencies are organized under a Cabinet Secretary.

== Executive Branch ==
The executive branch of government is headed by the Governor of Oklahoma, who is assisted in managing the executive branch by Cabinet Secretaries appointed by the Governor with the consent of the Oklahoma Senate. The Lieutenant Governor of Oklahoma serves as President of the Senate and is first in line to succeed to the Governorship in the event of a vacancy. The role the Lieutenant Governor performs in the executive branch is determined by the Governor. The Governor may appoint the Lieutenant Governor as a Cabinet Secretary.

State-wide elected officials and major state departments are bolded
Cabinet Secretary have no authority over state-wide elected officials and are only listed for liaison purposes

=== Secretary of State ===
- **Office of the Secretary of State**
- Oklahoma Council on Judicial Complaints
- Oklahoma State Election Board
- Oklahoma Ethics Commission
- Oklahoma Judicial Nominating Commission

=== Secretary of Agriculture ===
- Advisors on Oklahoma Feed Yards Act
- All Commodity Commissions
- Boll Weevil Eradication Organization
- **Oklahoma Conservation Commission**
- **Oklahoma Department of Agriculture, Food, and Forestry**
  - State Board of Agriculture (governing body of Department)
  - State Bureau of Standards
  - Agriculture Enhancement and Diversification Advisory Board
  - Apiary Advisory Committee
  - Concentrated Animal Feeding Operations Act Rule Advisory Committee
  - Forestry Cost-share Advisory Committee
  - Registered Poultry Feeding Operations Act Rule Advisory Committee
- Fire Protection Compact and Advisory Commission
- Peanut Commission
- Pecan Marketing Board
- Sheep and Wool Commission
- Sorghum Commission
- South Central Interstate Forest
- State Board of Registration for Foresters
- Wheat Commission

=== Secretary of Commerce and Tourism ===
- **Commerce entities—**
  - **Office of the Labor Commissioner**
    - **Oklahoma Department of Labor**
  - All Sub-State Planning Districts
  - Workforce Investment Boards
  - Black Advisory Task Force
  - **Oklahoma Department of Commerce**
    - Office for Minority and Disadvantaged Business Enterprises
    - Small Business Regulatory Review Committee
    - Task Force on Oklahoma Illegal Immigration Issues
    - Native American Cultural and Educational Authority
  - East Central Oklahoma Building Authority
  - Kiamichi Development Authority
  - Mid-South Industrial Authority
  - Midwestern Oklahoma Development Authority
  - Oklahoma Capital Investment Board
  - Oklahoma Development Finance Authority
  - **Oklahoma Employment Security Commission**
  - Oklahoma Firemen’s Building Authority
  - Oklahoma Housing Finance Agency
  - Oklahoma Industrial Finance Authority
  - Oklahoma Municipal Power Authority Board
  - Oklahoma Ordnance Works Authority
  - Southeastern Oklahoma Industries Authority
  - Southern Growth Policies Board
  - Southern Oklahoma Development Trust
- **Tourism entities—**
  - **Oklahoma Department of Tourism and Recreation**
    - Oklahoma Tourism and Recreation Commission (governing body of Department)
    - Oklahoma Film and Music Advisory Commission
    - Oklahoma Tourism Promotion Advisory Committee
  - Governor’s Commission for Oklahoma Artisans
  - Historic Preservation Review Committee
  - Historical Records Advisory Board
  - J.M. Davis Memorial Commission
  - Oklahoma Capitol Complex and Centennial Commemoration Commission
  - **Oklahoma Historical Society**
  - Oklahoma Jazz Hall of Fame
  - Oklahoma Memorial Committee
  - Oklahoma Sam Noble Museum of Natural History
  - **Oklahoma Scenic Rivers Commission**
  - State Geographer
  - State Register of Natural Heritage Areas
  - Will Rogers Memorial Commission

=== Secretary of Education ===
- **Office of the Superintendent of Public Instruction**
- Anatomical Board
- Arts Council
- Board of Private Vocation School
- Commission for Teacher Preparation
- **Oklahoma State Department of Education**
- **Oklahoma Department of Libraries**
- **Oklahoma Department of Career and Technology Education**
- Oklahoma Educational Television Authority
- Medical Technology and Research Authority
- Student Loan Authority
- Oklahoma School of Science and Mathematics
- Oklahoma State System of Higher Education
  - State Regents for Higher Education (governing body of System)
  - Board of Regents for Oklahoma Agricultural and Mechanical Colleges
    - Connors State College
    - Langston University
    - Northeastern Oklahoma A&M College
    - Oklahoma Panhandle State University
    - Oklahoma State University
  - Board of Regents for the University of Oklahoma
    - Cameron University
    - Rogers State University
    - University of Oklahoma
  - Board of Regents of Oklahoma Colleges
    - University of Central Oklahoma
    - East Central University
    - Southwestern Oklahoma State University
    - Southeastern Oklahoma State University
    - Northwestern Oklahoma State University
    - Northeastern State University
  - Carl Albert State College
  - Eastern Oklahoma State College
  - Redlands Community College
  - Murray State College
  - Northern Oklahoma College
  - Oklahoma City Community College
  - Rogers University
  - Rose State College
  - Seminole State College
  - Tulsa Community College
  - University of Science and Arts of Oklahoma
  - Western Oklahoma State College

=== Secretary of Energy ===
- **Office of the Oklahoma Secretary of Energy**
- **Oklahoma Bioenergy Center**
- **Oklahoma Corporation Commission**
- **Oklahoma Department of Mines**
  - Oklahoma Mining Commission (governing body of Department)
  - Oklahoma Miner Training Institute
- East Central Gas Authority
- Grand River Dam Authority
  - GRDA Board of Directors
    - GRDA Board of Directors Nominating Committee
- Oklahoma Marginal Wells Commission
- Interstate Mining Commission
- Interstate Oil and Gas Compact Commission
- Liquefied Petroleum Gas Board
- LPG Research, Marketing, and Safety Commission
- North Central Oklahoma Municipal Power Pool Authority
- Oklahoma Energy Resources Board
- Southern States Energy Board
- Southern States Energy Compact

=== Secretary of the Environment ===
- **Office of the Oklahoma Secretary of the Environment**
- **Oklahoma Department of Environmental Quality**
  - Environmental Quality Board (governing body of Department)
  - Air Quality Advisory Council
  - Central Interstate Low-Level Radioactive Waste Compact Commission
  - Hazardous Waste Management Advisory Council
  - Laboratory Services Advisory Council
  - Radiation Management Advisory Council
  - Small Business Compliance Advisory Panel
  - Solid Waste Management Advisory Council
  - Water Quality Management Advisory Council
  - Waterworks and Wastewater Works Advisory Council
- **Oklahoma Department of Wildlife Conservation**
  - Wildlife Conservation Commission (governing body of Department)
- High Plains Study Council and Task Force
- Illinois River Task Force
- Lone Chimney Water Association
- Oklahoma Water Research Institute
  - Governor’s Water Resources Research Coordinating Committee
- **Oklahoma Water Resources Board**
  - Arkansas-Oklahoma Arkansas River Compact Commission
  - Arkansas River Basin Interstate Committee
  - Arkansas-White-Red River Basins Interagency Commission
  - Canadian River Commission
  - Kansas-Oklahoma Arkansas River Compact Commission
  - Red River Compact Commission
  - Water Law Advisory Committee
- Ottawa Reclamation Authority

=== Secretary of Finance and Revenue ===
- **Office of the Insurance Commissioner**
  - **Oklahoma Department of Insurance**
- **Office of the State Auditor and Inspector**
- **Office of the State Treasurer**
- Advisory Task Force on Sale of School Lands
- Advisory Committee on Intergovernmental Relations
- Board of Trustees of Teachers’ Retirement System
- Oklahoma Board on Legislative Compensation
- Building Bonds Commission
- Capitol Improvement Authority
- Oklahoma Commissioners of the Land Office
- CompSource Oklahoma (formerly State Insurance Fund)
  - CompSource Board of Managers
- Contingency Review Board
- Credit Union Board
- **Oklahoma Department of Consumer Credit**
  - Commission on Consumer Credit (governing body of Department)
- **Oklahoma Department of Securities**
  - Oklahoma Securities Commission (governing body of Department)
- Executive Bond Oversight Commission
- Oklahoma Firefighters Pension and Retirement System
  - Firefighters Pension and Retirement Board
- Fund Board of Investors
- Industry Advisory Committee
- Law Enforcement Retirement Board
- Life and Health Insurance Guaranty Association
- Linked Deposit Review Board
- Multiple Injury Trust Fund
- **Oklahoma Office of State Finance**
- Oklahoma College Savings Plan Board of Trustees
- Oklahoma Commissioners of the Land Office
- Oklahoma State Pension Commission
- Oklahoma Public Employees Retirement System
  - Public Employees Retirement Board
- **Oklahoma Tax Commission**
- Oklahoma Police Pension and Retirement System
  - Police Pension and Retirement Board
- Property and Casualty Insurance Guaranty Association
- Property and Casualty Rates Board
- Special Agency Account Board
- **Oklahoma State Banking Department**
  - Oklahoma State Banking Board (governing body of Department)
- Oklahoma State Board of Equalization
- Oklahoma State Bond Advisor
  - Council of Bond Oversight
  - Long-Range Capital Planning Commission
- Oklahoma Teachers’ Retirement System
  - Teachers' Retirement Board
- Tobacco Settlement Endowment Trust

=== Secretary of Health and Human Services ===
- **Health entities—**
  - Community Hospitals Authority
  - Construction Industries Board
    - Committee of Electrical Examiners
    - Committee of Mechanical Examiners
    - Committee of Plumbing Examiners
    - Electrical Hearing Board
    - Electrical Installation Code Variance and Appeals Board
    - Inspector Examiners Committee
    - Mechanical Hearing Board
    - Mechanical Installation Code Variance and Appeals Board
    - Plumbing Hearing Board
    - Plumbing Installation Code Variance and Appeals Board
  - **Oklahoma State Department of Health**
    - State Board of Health (governing body of Department)
    - Advisory Council on Traumatic Spinal Cord and Traumatic Brain Injury
    - Agent Orange Outreach Committee
    - Alarm Industry Committee
    - Alzheimer’s Research Advisory Council
    - State Barber Advisory Board
    - Breast Cancer Prevention and Treatment Advisory Committee
    - Boxing Advisory Committee
    - Office of Child Abuse Prevention
    - Interagency Child Abuse Prevention Task Force
    - Child Abuse Training and Coordination Council
    - Childhood Lead Poisoning Prevention Advisory Council
    - Licensed Professional Counselors Advisory Board
    - Driver’s License Medical Advisory Committee
    - Emergency Response Systems Development Advisory Council
    - Governor’s Advisory Committee on Aging
    - Health Care Information Advisory Committee
    - Hearing Aid Advisory Council
    - Home Health Advisory Board
    - Hospice Advisory Council
    - Long-Term Care Facility Advisory Board
    - Licensed Professional Counselors Advisory Board
    - Licensed Marital and Family Therapists Advisory Board
    - Medical Audit Committee
    - Medical Direction Subcommittee
    - Organ Donor Education and Awareness Program Advisory Council
    - Internagency Council on Osteoporosis
    - Radiation Advisory Committee
    - Residents and Family State Council
    - Sanitarian and Environmental Specialist Registration Advisory Council
    - Vision Screening Standards Advisory Committee
    - Edercare Program Advisory Committee
  - **Oklahoma Department of Mental Health and Substance Abuse Services**
    - State Board of Mental Health and Substance Abuse Services (governing body of Department)
    - Advisory Council on Alcohol and Drug Abuse
    - Alcohol and Drug Abuse Prevention and Life Skills Education Advisory Council
    - Alcohol and Drug Abuse Prevention, Training, Treatment and Rehabilitation Authority
    - Alcohol, Drug Abuse and Community Mental Health Planning and Coordination Boards
    - Office of Consumer Advocacy
    - Forensics Review Board
    - Mental Health Advisory Committee on Deafness and Hearing Impairment
    - Office of Consumer Advocacy (MHSAS)
  - **Oklahoma Health Care Authority**
    - Advisory Committee for Medical Care for Public Assistance Recipients
    - Health Care Study Commission
  - State Board of Examiners for Long-Term Care Administrators
  - Oklahoma Tobacco Settlement Endowment Trust
    - Tobacco Settlement Endowment Trust Board of Directors (governing body of Trust)
    - Tobacco Settlement Endowment Trust Board of Investors
- **Human Services entities—**
  - Cerebral Palsy Commission
  - J.D. McCarty Center for Children with Developmental Disabilities
  - Commission on Children and Youth
    - Advisory Task Force on Child Abuse and Neglect
    - Child Abuse Examination Board
    - Child Abuse Prevention Office
    - Child Abuse Prevention Training and Coordination Council
    - Child Death Review Board
    - Planning and Coordinating Council for Services to Children and Youth
    - Office of Juvenile Systems Oversight
    - Group Homes/Developmentally Disabled or Physically Handicapped Persons
    - Interdisciplinary Council on the Prevention of Juvenile Sex Offenses
  - **Oklahoma Department of Human Services**
    - Commission for Human Services (governing body of department)
    - Developmental Disabilities Council
    - Governor’s Advisory Committee on Aging
    - Office of Faith-based and Community Initiatives
    - Office of Public Guardian
  - **Oklahoma Department of Rehabilitation Services**
    - Commission for Rehabilitation Services (governing body of department)
    - Committee of Blind Vendors
    - Committee on Employment of the Handicapped
    - Governor's Advisory Committee on Handicapped Concerns
    - Statewide Independent Living Council
  - Indian Affairs Commission
  - Office of Disability Concerns
  - Oklahoma Office of Juvenile Affairs
    - Board of Juvenile Affairs
  - Physician Manpower Training Commission
  - University Hospitals Authority and Trust

=== Secretary of Human Resources and Administration ===
- Accountancy Board
- Alternative Fuels Technician Examiners Hearing Board
- Architects and Landscape Architects Board
- Athletic Trainers Advisory Committee
- Board of Licensed Social Workers
- Certified Public Manager Advisory Board
- Chiropractic Examiners Board
- Dentistry Board
- **Oklahoma Department of Central Services**
  - State Capitol Preservation Commission
  - Oklahoma Capitol Improvement Authority
  - Capitol-Medical Center Improvement and Zoning Commission and Citizens Advisory Committee
  - State Use Committee
  - Public Employees Relations Board
- Dietetic Registration Advisory Committee
- Electrologists Advisory Committee
- Embalmers and Funeral Directors Board
- Engineers and Land Surveyors, Board of Registration
- Horse Racing Commission
- Human Rights Commission
- Medical Licensure and Supervision Board
- **Oklahoma Merit Protection Commission**
- Motor Vehicle Commission
- Nurse Anesthetist Formulary Advisory Council
- Nurse Formulary Advisory Council
- Nursing Board and Advisory Council
- Occupational Therapy Advisory Committee
- **Oklahoma Office of Personnel Management**
  - Affirmative Action Review Council
  - Governor’s Advisory Council on Asian-American Affairs
  - Governor’s Advisory Council on Latin American and Hispanic Affairs
  - Governor's Ethnic American Advisory Council
  - Committee for Incentive Awards for State Employees
  - Mentor Selection Advisory Committee
  - Oversight Committee for State Employee Charitable Contributions
  - Employee Assistance Program Advisory Council
- Oklahoma Commission on the Status of Women
- Optometry Examiners Board
- Osteopathic Examiners Board
- Perfusionists Board of Examiners
- Pharmacy Board
- Physical Therapy Committee
- Physician’s Assistant Advisory Committee
- Podiatric Medical Examiners Board
- Psychologist Board of Examiners
- Real Estate Appraiser Board
- Real Estate Commission
- Respiratory Care Advisory Committee
- Sanitarian Registration Advisory Council
- Savings & Loan Advisory Council
- Speech Pathology and Audiology Board of Examiners
- State Board of Cosmetology
- State Employee Child Day Care Advisory Committee
- State Employees Benefits Council
- State/Education Employees Group Insurance Board
- Used Motor Vehicle & Parts Commission
- Veterinary Medical Examiners Board

=== Secretary of the Military ===
- Adjutant General of Oklahoma
- **Oklahoma Department of the Military**

=== Secretary of Safety and Security ===
- **Attorney General of Oklahoma**
  - Office of the Attorney General
- Alcoholic Beverage Laws Enforcement Commission
- Council on Firefighter Training
- Council on Law Enforcement Education and Training
  - Polygraph Examiners Board
- Bureau of Narcotics and Dangerous Drugs Control
- **Department of Corrections**
  - State Board of Corrections (governing body of Department)
  - Board of Directors for Canteen Services
- **Department of Emergency Management**
  - Emergency Management Advisory Council
  - Hazardous Materials Emergency Response Commission
- **Department of Public Safety**
  - Board of Tests for Alcohol and Drug Influence
  - Driver’s License Compact
  - Driver’s License Medical Advisory Committee
  - Oklahoma Office of Homeland Security
  - Oklahoma Highway Patrol
  - Oklahoma Highway Safety Office
- District Attorneys Council
- Indigent Defense System
  - Indigent Defense System Board
- Office of the Chief Medical Examiner
- Office of State Fire Marshal
- Pardon and Parole Board
- State Bureau of Investigation

=== Secretary of Science and Technology ===
- Oklahoma Archeological Survey
- Oklahoma Biological Survey
- Oklahoma Climatological Survey
- Oklahoma Geological Survey
- Oklahoma Center for the Advancement of Science and Technology
  - Governor's Science and Technology Council
  - Science and Technology Research and Development Board
  - Health Research Committee
  - Oklahoma Institute of Technology

=== Secretary of Transportation ===
- Oklahoma Aeronautics Commission
- All Port Authorities
- **Oklahoma Department of Transportation**
  - Highway Construction Materials Technician Certification Board
  - Tourism Signage Advisory Task Force
  - Trucking Advisory Board
  - Waterways Advisory Board
- Oklahoma Space Industry Development Authority
- Oklahoma Turnpike Authority

=== Secretary of Veterans Affairs ===
- **Oklahoma Department of Veterans Affairs**
  - Oklahoma War Veterans Commission (governing body of Department)

== Legislative Branch ==
- Board on Legislative Compensation
- Legislative Service Bureau
  - Oklahoma Criminal Justice Resource Center

== Judicial Branch ==
- Board of Judicial Compensation
- Council on Judicial Complaints
- Oklahoma Judicial Nominating Commission

== See also ==
- List of United States federal agencies
- Government of Oklahoma
