= Oklahoma Secretary of Finance and Revenue =

Oklahoma Secretary of Finance, Administration and Information Technology
- Great Seal of Oklahoma

Agency overview
- Formed: June 6, 1986
- Headquarters: 2300 N. Lincoln Boulevard; Oklahoma City, Oklahoma
- Employees: 2998 (FY2011)
- Annual budget: $3.3 billion (FY2011)
- Minister responsible: Clark Jolley, Secretary of Finance, Administration and Information Technology
- Child agencies: Tax Commission; Office of Management and Enterprise Services; State Banking Department; Department of Insurance; Department of Securities; Department of Consumer Credit
- Website: Office of Management and Enterprise Services

The Oklahoma Secretary of Finance, Administration and Information Technology is a member of the Oklahoma Governor's Cabinet. The Secretary is appointed by the governor, with the consent of the Oklahoma Senate, to serve at the pleasure of the governor. The secretary serves as the chief adviser to the governor on fiscal policy, taxation, and the operations and personnel needs of the state government.

The most recent secretary was Clark Jolley, who was appointed by Governor Mary Fallin on February 28, 2018, and served in that post until January, 2019.

== History ==
The position of Secretary of Finance was established in 1986 to provide greater oversight and coordination to the financial and revenue activities of the State government. The position was established, along with the Oklahoma State Cabinet, by the Executive Branch Reform Act of 1986. The Act directed the Secretary of Finance and Revenue to advise the Governor on financial policy and advise the state financial agencies on new policy as directed by the governor. In 2011, the Oklahoma Legislature passed the Government Administrative Process Consolidation and Reorganization Act of 2011. This consolidated the duties and responsibilities of the Oklahoma Secretary of Human Resources and Administration into those of the Finance Secretary, thereby greatly increasing the duties and authority of the position.

Oklahoma state law allows for cabinet secretaries to serve concurrently as the head of a state agency and as a cabinet secretary. Historically, the Secretary of Finance has also served as the director of the Oklahoma Office of State Finance. As of 2013, at least two secretaries have served in that dual position. Alternatively, Secretary Scott Meacham had previously served as OSF Director until he was appointed as state treasurer in 2005, though he continued to serve as secretary.

In 2018, Oklahoma Tax Commission Vice Chairman Clark Jolley became the first secretary to serve in an agency other than the Office of State Finance or its successor agency, the Office of Management and Enterprise Services.

== Responsibilities ==
The Secretary of Finance, Administration and Information Technology is responsible for the overseeing the formation of the Oklahoma state budget, developing fiscal policy and for determining taxation policy. Additionally, the position is responsible for oversee the State's financial market through the regulation of financial institutions, consumer credit, and securities. The secretary is one of the central positions within the state government as it is responsible for overseeing government-wide spending and public debt management. The secretary is also responsible for overseeing the State employee pension programs. The secretary is also responsible for providing services to help manage and support the basic functioning of all state agencies. These services included personnel management, central purchasing, state motor pool management, building maintenance and construction, as well as central printing and mailing.

As of fiscal year 2017, the Secretary of Finance, Administration and Revenue oversees 2998 full-time employees and is responsible for an annual budget of $938,273,144.63 (not including assets of the retirement systems, which increases the overall oversight to closer to $31,550,000,000).

== Salary ==
The annual salary of the Secretary of Finance, Administration and Information Technology is set by law at $90,000. Despite this law, if the secretary serves as the head of state agency, the secretary receives the higher of the two salaries. Since incumbent Secretary Clark Jolley also serves as the Vice Chairman of the Oklahoma Tax Commission, he receives the salary allowed for that position. As of 2018, the annual salary for that position is set at $131,000.

== Agencies overseen ==
The Secretary of Finance, Administration and Information Technology oversees the following state entities:

Agency	Employees	Budget (in millions)	Function
Office of the State Treasurer	90	$13,040,061	Oversees all State revenues
Office of the State Auditor and Inspector	169	$11,134,327	Performs financial audits of State government
Commissioners of the Land Office	63	$58,288,600	Manages school lands
Department of Consumer Credit	19	$5,170,112.26	Regulates non-institutional credit markets
Department of Insurance	153	$15,668,124.57	Regulates insurance companies
Department of Securities	28	$6,537,056.24	Regulates securities and stock
Office of Management and Enterprise Services	1325	$354,147,052	Oversees all State finances, statewide human resources, and statewide property management
Tax Commission	1150	$106,712,423	Collects State taxes and enforces tax laws
State Banking Department	40	$8,038,459.97	Regulates financial institutions
Firefighters Pension and Retirement System	10	$21,491,616.92	Provides retirement benefits for State's firefighters
Law Enforcement Retirement System	5	$5,102,979.64	Provides retirement benefits for State government law enforcement officers
Public Employees Retirement System	56	$8,104,415.50	Provides retirement benefits for State employees
Police Pension and Retirement System	11	$2,906,977.98	Provides retirement benefits for State's police officers
Teachers’ Retirement System	41	$321,930,938.55	Provides retirement benefits for State's teachers
Pension Commission	N/A	N/A	Oversees all public pension systems
Board of Equalization	N/A	N/A	Estimates State revenue for fiscal year
Capitol Improvement Authority	N/A	N/A	Issues bonds to finance the construction of State buildings

- All numbers represent fiscal year Fiscal Year 2017 levels

== List of secretaries ==
Name	Took office	Left office	Governor served under
Tom Daxon	1995	2003	Frank Keating
Scott Meacham	2003	2011	Brad Henry
Preston Doerflinger	January 19, 2011	February 14, 2018	Mary Fallin
Clark Jolley	February 28, 2018	Present	Mary Fallin
