= Oklahoma Capitol Improvement Authority =

- Great Seal of Oklahoma

Agency overview
- Formed: June 27, 1959
- Headquarters: Will Rogers Office Building; 2401 Lincoln; Oklahoma City
- Employees: 5
- Ministers responsible: Preston Doerflinger, Secretary of Finance and Revenue; Mary Fallin, Chair of Board
- Website: Oklahoma Capitol Improvement Authority

The Oklahoma Capitol Improvement Authority (OCIA) is an Oklahoma state agency responsible for issuing bonds to finance the construction of buildings or other facilities for the State of Oklahoma, its departments and agencies.

The Oklahoma Office of Management and Enterprise Services's Capital Asset Management Division is responsible for providing staff support services to the Authority. The Attorney General of Oklahoma provides legal counsel to OCIA and the Oklahoma State Bond Advisor provides advice on the issuance of bonds and other obligations.

== Membership ==
As of June 2013, the commission has the following members:

Agency	Incumbent	Position on Authority	Other government position
Governor	Mary Fallin	Chair	
Lieutenant Governor	Todd Lamb	Vice Chair	
State Treasurer	Ken A. Miller		
Office of Management and Enterprise Services	Preston Doerflinger	Secretary	Secretary of Finance and Revenue
Tax Commission	Dwan Cash		
Department of Human Services	Ed Lake		
Department of Tourism and Recreation	Deby Snodgress		
Department of Transportation	Gary Ridley		Secretary of Transportation
