= Oklahoma State Board of Equalization =

- Great Seal of Oklahoma

Agency overview
- Formed: 1907
- Headquarters: Oklahoma State Capitol; Oklahoma City, Oklahoma
- Ministers responsible: Kevin Stitt, Chair of the Board; Randy McDaniel, Oklahoma State Treasurer
- Agency executive: Cindy Byrd, Secretary of the Board

The Oklahoma State Board of Equalization is an agency of the state of Oklahoma that is responsible for tax administration. The Board is responsible for adjusting and equalizing the valuation of real and personal property of the several counties of Oklahoma. Board is also responsible for providing an estimate of all revenue that will be available for appropriation by the Oklahoma Legislature for the coming fiscal year.

The State Board of Equalization was established in 1907 by ratification of the Oklahoma Constitution.

== Leadership ==
The State Board of Equalization is under the leadership of the Governor of Oklahoma, the Oklahoma State Auditor and Inspector and the Secretary of Finance and Revenue.

== Composition ==
As established by Article 10 of the Oklahoma Constitution, the Board was composed of seven elected officials. Following an amendment to the Constitution in 1975, the Board now consists of six elected officials and one appointed official, with all members serving as ex officio members.

As of 2022, the current membership of the Board is as follows:

- Governor of Oklahoma Kevin Stitt - Chairman
- Lieutenant Governor of Oklahoma Matt Pinnell - Vice Chair
- Oklahoma State Auditor and Inspector Cindy Byrd - Secretary
- State Treasurer of Oklahoma Todd Russ
- Attorney General of Oklahoma Gentner Drummond
- Oklahoma Superintendent of Public Instruction Ryan Walters
- President of the Board of Agriculture Blayne Arthur

== Functions ==
On December 1 of each year, or the first working day thereafter, the Board must equalize the taxable real and personal property value of the several counties for the purpose of tax assessment by the county assessors. This is done by determining the ratio of the aggregate assessed value of the county to the fair cash value of the county. The Board also examines the various county assessments to equalize, correct and adjust them as between and within the counties. The Board is responsible for determine the assessment ratio for all air carrier, railroad, and public service corporation property in the state.

The Board is responsible for providing an estimate of all revenue that will be available for appropriation by the Oklahoma Legislature for the coming year fiscal year. The Governor, through the Oklahoma Office of State Finance, then uses that estimate to prepare and submit the State's annual budget for approval by the Legislature.

== See also ==
- Oklahoma Tax Commission
- Oklahoma Office of State Finance
