= 2022 Oklahoma State Treasurer election =

- November 8, 2022
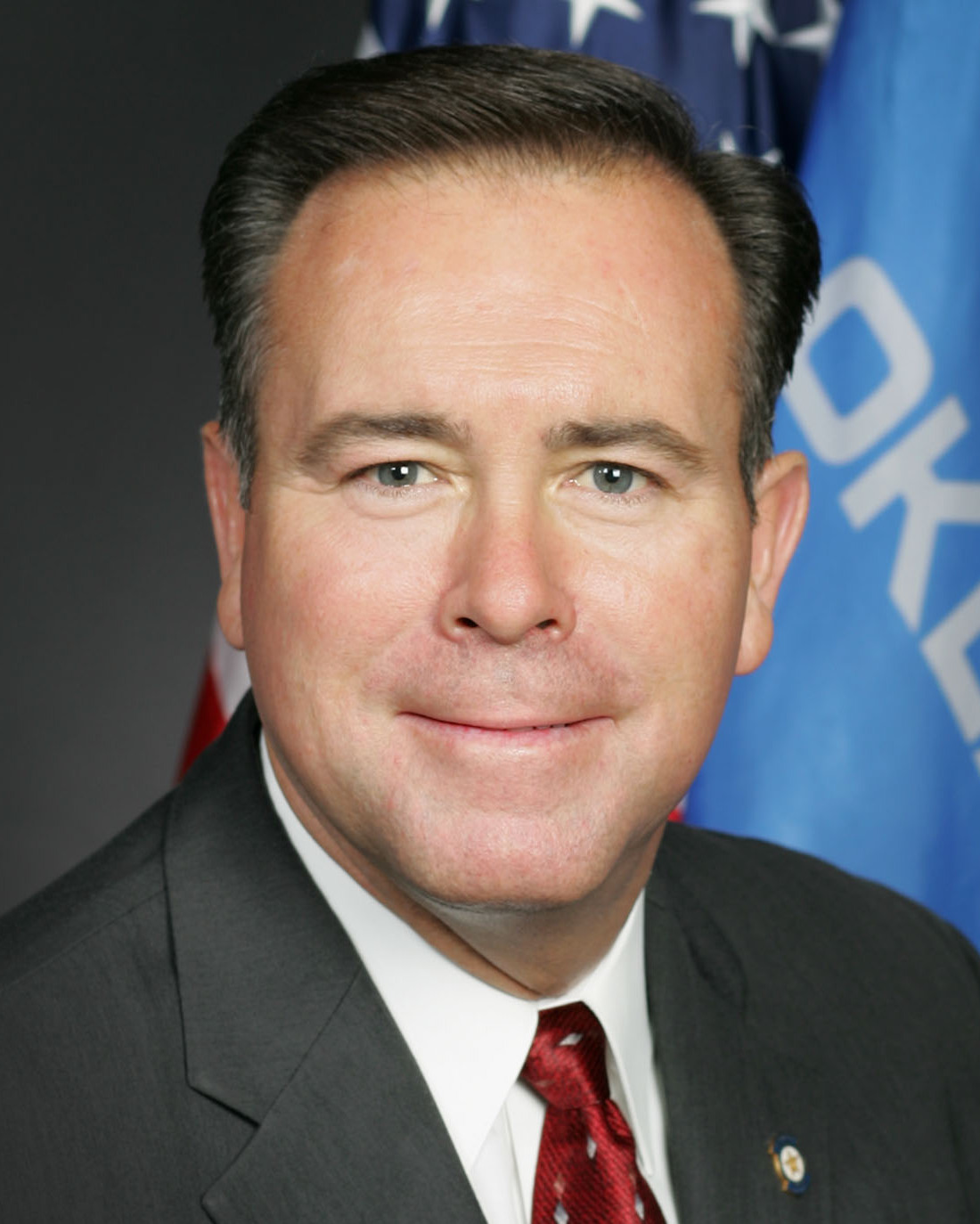

Nominee	Todd Russ	Charles de Coune
Party	Republican	Democratic
Popular vote	738,545	349,876
Percentage	64.77%	30.68%
- Russ: 40–50% 50–60% 60–70% 70–80% 80–90% >90% De Coune: 40–50% 50–60% 60–70% 70–80% 80–90% >90% Tie: 40–50% 50% No votes
State Treasurer before election
Randy McDaniel
Republican
Elected State Treasurer
Todd Russ
Republican

The 2022 Oklahoma State Treasurer election took place on November 8, 2022, to elect the next Oklahoma State Treasurer. The primary election was scheduled for Tuesday, June 28, 2022. Runoff primary elections, if necessary, would have been held on Tuesday, August 23, 2022. The deadline for candidates to file was April 15, 2022.

Incumbent Republican Party Treasurer Randy McDaniel did not seek re-election. Former state house representative and Republican nominee Todd Russ defeated Democratic nominee Charles De Coune and Libertarian nominee Gregory Sadler.

== Republican primary ==
=== Candidates ===
==== Nominee ====
- Todd Russ, former state representative from the 55th district (2009–2022)

==== Eliminated in runoff ====
- Clark Jolley, former chair of the Oklahoma Tax Commission (2017–2021) and former state senator (2004–2016)

==== Eliminated in primary ====
- David Hooten, Oklahoma County Clerk (2016–2022)

==== Withdrew ====
- Mike Mazzei, former state senator (2004–2016)

==== Declined ====
- Randy McDaniel, incumbent treasurer

=== Endorsements ===
Mike Mazzei (withdrew)

Statewide officials

- Ken Miller, former Oklahoma State Treasurer (2011–2019)

State senators

- David Rader, state senator from the 39th district (2017–)
- Roger Thompson, state senator from the 8th district (2015–)
Todd Russ

Newspapers

- Tulsa Beacon

Organizations

- Oklahomans for Health and Parental Rights

=== Polling ===
Poll source	Date(s) administered	Sample size (Note: Key: A – all adults RV – registered voters LV – likely voters V – unclear)	Margin of error	David B. Hooten	Clark Jolley	Todd Russ	Other	Undecided
SoonerPoll	June 13–21, 2022	350 (LV)	± 5.2%	6%	8%	13%	–	73%
Amber Integrated (R)	June 6–9, 2022	400 (LV)	± 4.9%	13%	14%	19%	–	53%
SoonerPoll	April 25 – May 11, 2022	306 (LV)	± 5.6%	6%	8%	9%	–	76%
Amber Integrated (R)	March 24–27, 2022	455 (LV)	± 4.6%	11%	10%	7%	–	72%
Amber Integrated (R)	December 15–19, 2021	253 (RV)	± 6.2%	20%	9%	15%	4%	52%

=== Results ===
Republican primary results
Party	Candidate	Votes	%
Republican	Todd Russ	164,376	48.5
Republican	Clark Jolley	114,776	33.9
Republican	David Hooten	59,721	17.6
Total votes		338,873	100.0

=== Runoff debate ===
2022 Oklahoma State Treasurer Republican runoff debate
No.	Date	Host	Moderator	Link	Republican	Republican
Key: P Participant A Absent N Not invited I Invited W Withdrawn						
Key: P Participant A Absent N Not invited I Invited W Withdrawn					Clark Jolley	Todd Russ
1	Aug. 16, 2022	KWTV-DT	Storm Jones; Tres Savage	YouTube	P	P

=== Runoff polling ===
Poll source	Date(s) administered	Sample size	Margin of error	Clark Jolley	Todd Russ	Undecided
SoonerPoll	August 11–17, 2022	322 (LV)	± 5.4%	50%	46%	3%
Amber Integrated (R)	August 11–15, 2022	684 (LV)	± 3.8%	27%	28%	46%

=== Results ===
Republican primary results
Party	Candidate	Votes	%
Republican	Todd Russ	150,431	55.5
Republican	Clark Jolley	120,561	44.5
Total votes		270,992	100.0

== General election ==
=== Candidates ===
- Charles de Coune, candidate for Oklahoma County Court Clerk in 2020 and Independent candidate for State Treasurer in 2018 (Democratic nominee)
- Todd Russ (Republican nominee)
- Gregory Sadler, candidate for the Oklahoma State Senate in 2020 (Libertarian nominee)

=== Endorsements ===
Todd Russ (R)

Newspapers

- Tulsa World
Charles de Coune (D)

Labor unions

- Communications Workers of America

=== Polling ===
Poll source	Date(s) administered	Sample size	Margin of error	Todd Russ (R)	Charles de Coune (D)	Gregory Sadler (L)	Undecided
SoonerPoll	September 2–7, 2022	402 (LV)	± 4.9%	50%	27%	3%	20%

=== Results ===
2022 Oklahoma state treasurer election
Party	Candidate	Votes	%	±%
Republican	Todd Russ	738,545	64.77%	−6.81%
Democratic	Charles de Coune	349,876	30.68%	N/A
Libertarian	Gregory Sadler	51,858	4.55%	N/A
Total votes		1,140,279	100.00%	
Turnout		1,140,279	49.67%	
Registered electors		2,295,906		

==== By county ====
County	Todd Russ Republican		Charles de Coune Democratic		Gregory Sadler Libertarian	
County	#	%	#	%	#	%
Adair	3,813	74.14%	1,120	21.78%	210	4.08%
Alfalfa	1,495	86.97%	161	9.37%	63	3.66%
Atoka	3,130	80.61%	639	16.46%	114	2.94%
Beaver	1,499	88.91%	124	7.35%	63	3.74%
Beckham	4,285	78.41%	890	16.29%	290	5.31%
Blaine	2,320	78.75%	499	16.94%	127	4.31%
Bryan	8,580	75.42%	2,330	20.48%	466	4.10%
Caddo	4,951	70.48%	1,786	25.42%	288	4.10%
Canadian	34,179	68.95%	12,746	25.71%	2,649	5.34%
Carter	9,849	73.91%	2,916	21.88%	561	4.21%
Cherokee	7,924	59.13%	4,749	35.44%	727	5.43%
Choctaw	3,190	79.41%	701	17.45%	126	3.14%
Cimarron	664	91.46%	38	5.23%	24	3.31%
Cleveland	49,590	55.05%	35,931	39.89%	4,564	5.07%
Coal	1,490	80.11%	300	16.13%	70	3.76%
Comanche	14,296	61.10%	7,730	33.04%	1,373	5.87%
Cotton	1,480	81.14%	256	14.04%	88	4.82%
Craig	3,267	73.78%	996	22.49%	165	3.73%
Creek	16,554	74.71%	4,651	20.99%	953	4.30%
Custer	5,605	75.17%	1,543	20.69%	308	4.13%
Delaware	10,049	76.71%	2,628	20.06%	423	3.23%
Dewey	1,529	87.22%	163	9.30%	61	3.48%
Ellis	1,293	87.48%	129	8.73%	56	3.79%
Garfield	12,317	76.55%	3,096	19.24%	678	4.21%
Garvin	6,324	78.56%	1,443	17.93%	283	3.52%
Grady	13,750	77.82%	3,135	17.74%	783	4.43%
Grant	1,311	83.19%	206	13.07%	59	3.74%
Greer	1,055	79.03%	233	17.45%	47	3.52%
Harmon	508	79.50%	116	18.15%	15	2.35%
Harper	991	86.10%	112	9.73%	48	4.17%
Haskell	2,621	77.98%	655	19.49%	85	2.53%
Hughes	2,646	75.41%	711	20.26%	152	4.33%
Jackson	4,329	79.14%	900	16.45%	241	4.41%
Jefferson	1,287	81.30%	234	14.78%	62	3.92%
Johnston	2,357	80.14%	495	16.83%	89	3.03%
Kay	9,006	72.38%	2,875	23.11%	561	4.51%
Kingfisher	4,073	84.24%	561	11.60%	201	4.16%
Kiowa	1,828	74.64%	515	21.03%	106	4.33%
Latimer	2,287	75.48%	631	20.83%	112	3.70%
LeFlore	9,478	78.63%	2,183	18.11%	393	3.26%
Lincoln	8,568	78.04%	1,876	17.09%	535	4.87%
Logan	12,305	73.01%	3,758	22.30%	792	4.70%
Love	2,151	79.17%	472	17.37%	94	3.46%
McClain	11,499	77.13%	2,789	18.71%	621	4.17%
McCurtain	6,609	81.06%	1,298	15.92%	246	3.02%
McIntosh	4,500	70.12%	1,662	25.90%	256	3.99%
Major	2,337	87.92%	220	8.28%	101	3.80%
Marshall	3,428	78.68%	772	17.72%	157	3.60%
Mayes	9,155	73.06%	2,763	22.05%	613	4.89%
Murray	3,214	76.11%	817	19.35%	192	4.55%
Muskogee	11,348	64.29%	5,537	31.37%	767	4.35%
Noble	2,875	76.00%	714	18.87%	194	5.13%
Nowata	2,577	78.40%	573	17.43%	137	4.17%
Okfuskee	2,107	72.08%	687	23.50%	129	4.41%
Oklahoma	111,531	50.87%	97,799	44.60%	9,937	4.53%
Okmulgee	6,879	65.12%	3,210	30.39%	474	4.49%
Osage	9,928	66.28%	4,379	29.24%	671	4.48%
Ottawa	5,511	72.30%	1,836	24.09%	275	3.61%
Pawnee	3,741	74.67%	1,038	20.72%	231	4.61%
Payne	13,076	59.75%	7,567	34.58%	1,241	5.67%
Pittsburg	9,309	73.99%	2,788	22.16%	484	3.85%
Pontotoc	7,559	68.14%	3,023	27.25%	511	4.61%
Pottawatomie	14,343	69.96%	5,010	24.44%	1,149	5.60%
Pushmataha	2,632	80.96%	526	16.18%	93	2.86%
Roger Mills	1,070	81.55%	148	11.28%	94	7.16%
Rogers	25,101	74.71%	7,031	20.93%	1,466	4.36%
Seminole	4,164	71.42%	1,438	24.67%	228	3.91%
Sequoyah	7,685	75.35%	2,169	21.27%	345	3.38%
Stephens	10,359	79.57%	2,160	16.59%	499	3.83%
Texas	3,070	84.25%	427	11.72%	147	4.03%
Tillman	1,426	77.71%	334	18.20%	75	4.09%
Tulsa	110,026	57.48%	72,490	37.87%	8,915	4.66%
Wagoner	19,389	72.77%	6,059	22.74%	1,197	4.49%
Washington	12,527	73.83%	3,732	21.99%	709	4.18%
Washita	2,735	76.78%	577	16.20%	250	7.02%
Woods	2,151	80.20%	417	15.55%	114	4.25%
Woodward	4,460	83.40%	653	12.21%	235	4.39%
Totals	738,545	64.77%	349,876	30.68%	51,858	4.55%

==== By congressional district ====
Russ won all five congressional districts.

District	Russ	De Coun	Representative
1st	60%	35%	Kevin Hern
2nd	73%	23%	Markwayne Mullin (117th Congress)
2nd	73%	23%	Josh Brecheen (118th Congress)
3rd	70%	25%	Frank Lucas
4th	64%	32%	Tom Cole
5th	58%	37%	Stephanie Bice

== See also ==
- 2022 Oklahoma elections
