= Oklahoma State Pension Commission =

- Great Seal of Oklahoma

Agency overview
- Formed: July 1, 1988
- Headquarters: 2300 N. Lincoln, Room 123; Oklahoma City
- Employees: 1
- Ministers responsible: Randy McDaniel, State Treasurer; Cindy Byrd, State Auditor and Inspector
- Agency executive: Ruth Ann Chicoine, Administrator
- Website: Oklahoma State Pension Commission

The Oklahoma State Pension Commission is an Oklahoma state agency responsible for analyzing the performance of the State's public pension systems. The Commission also advises the Governor of Oklahoma and the Oklahoma Legislature on necessary action to improve the pension systems. The Commission is provided administrative support by the Office of the State Auditor and Inspector.

== Members ==
The Commission is composed of seven members: the Oklahoma State Treasurer, the Oklahoma State Auditor and Inspector, the Director of the Oklahoma Office of Management and Enterprise Services, a sitting State Senator appointed by the President pro tempore of the Oklahoma Senate, a sitting State Representative appointed by the Speaker of the Oklahoma House of Representatives, and two members appointed by the Governor of Oklahoma.

Office	Current Officer	Leadership
State Treasurer	Randy McDaniel	Chairman
State Auditor and Inspector	Cindy Byrd	Vice Chairman
Office of Management and Enterprise Services	Steven Harpe	Commissioner
House Speaker	Avery Frix	Appointee
Senate President Pro Tempore	Adam Winters	Appointee
Gubernatorial	Gary McAnally	Appointee
Gubernatorial	James Ward	Appointee

== Duties ==
The State Pension Commission provides guidance to the Governor of Oklahoma and the Oklahoma Legislature concerning the state's public retirement systems, including identifying problems and areas of abuse, projecting costs of existing systems and modifications to those systems, and recommending pension reform programs. Funding for the Commission is apportioned among the public pension systems in proportion to the percentage that each system's assets to the combined total of the assets of all systems.

The chief duty of the Commission is to publish on a quarterly basis a performance report analyzing the performance of each of the above state pension systems. The report includes rates of return on each systems' investments and details the solvency of each custodian bank or trust companies holding system funds. The Commission also analyses the investment plans developed by each system. Upon review, the Commission makes recommendations on administrative and legislative changes which are necessary to improve the performance of the retirement systems.

The Commission has no responsibility for or power over the actual day-to-day management or policy decisions of the various systems.

== Entities Overseen ==
The Pension Commission is responsible for overseeing financial status and conditions of the following:

- Oklahoma Firefighters Pension and Retirement System
- Oklahoma Police Pension and Retirement System
- Oklahoma Uniform Retirement System for Justices and Judges
- Oklahoma Law Enforcement Retirement System
- Oklahoma Teachers' Retirement System
- Oklahoma Public Employees Retirement System
- Oklahoma Department of Wildlife Conservation Retirement System
