= Tom Daxon =

American businessman and politician (1947–2022)

Chair of the Oklahoma Republican Party
- In office 2006–2008
- Preceded by: Gary Jones
- Succeeded by: Gary Jones

Oklahoma Secretary of Finance and Revenue
- In office March 17, 1995 – January 13, 2003
- Governor: Frank Keating
- Succeeded by: Scott Meacham

Oklahoma Director of State Finance
- In office March 17, 1995 – January 13, 2003
- Governor: Frank Keating
- Succeeded by: Scott Meacham

Interim County Treasurer for Orange County, California
- In office December 22, 1994 – March 17, 1995
- Preceded by: Robert Citron
- Succeeded by: John Moorlach

9th Oklahoma State Auditor and Inspector
- In office January 8, 1979 – January 10, 1983
- Governor: George Nigh
- Preceded by: John M. Rogers
- Succeeded by: Clifton Scott

Personal details
- Born: December 19, 1947 Oklahoma City, Oklahoma, U.S.
- Died: November 2, 2022 (aged 74) Oklahoma City, Oklahoma, U.S.
- Party: Republican
- Spouse: Linda Wright Daxon
- Education: Oklahoma State University
- Profession: Accountant, politician

Thomas E. Daxon (December 19, 1947 – November 2, 2022) was an American businessman and politician from Oklahoma. Daxon held numerous positions with the Oklahoma state government, including being elected Oklahoma State Auditor and Inspector in 1978 and serving as the Oklahoma Secretary of Finance and Revenue under Governor of Oklahoma Frank Keating. He was the Republican nominee for governor in the 1982 election, ultimately losing to Democratic incumbent George Nigh.

== Education and early career ==
A native of Oklahoma City, Daxon earned his bachelor's degree in economics from Oklahoma State University (OSU) in 1970 and received his master's degree in geography from OSU in 1977. While in college, Daxon became an activist for the Oklahoma Republican Party. He served as the president of the Oklahoma State University College Republicans.

After graduating from OSU, Daxon served two years on the staff of Campus Crusade for Christ before returning to OSU to obtain a master's degree. In 1975 he moved to Sand Springs, Oklahoma, and joined the Tulsa-based CPA firm of Hurdman and Cranstoun as an auditor.

== Oklahoma State Auditor ==
In 1978, Daxon was elected Oklahoma State Auditor and Inspector, unseating 20-year Democratic incumbent John M. Rogers. Within days of filling as a candidate, Rogers challenged Daxon's qualifications to run at the State Election Board saying that Daxon did not meet the constitutional requirements to seek the office. Daxon was 30 years old at the time of the November balloting and the state constitution said one had to be at least 31 years of age to hold the office. The state Election Board ruled against Daxon twice, removing him from the ballot. Daxon appealed the Election Board decision to the Oklahoma Supreme Court. The Supreme Court in a unanimous, landmark decision reinstated Daxon to the ballot, defining "election" for the first time as a process that began when a candidate filed with the state for office and concluded the following January when the Oklahoma legislature meet to certify the results. Since Daxon turned 31 on December 19, 1978, he met the state requirements by mere days and became the youngest person ever elected to statewide office in Oklahoma. At the time he was also the only Republican to hold statewide office.

When Daxon took over the office of Auditor and Inspector it had fallen into decline and was under scrutiny by the federal government for its poor audits. Daxon raised the number of CPAs on his staff from only 1 to 26 while cutting the total office staff from 126 to 81. He formed an investigative unit that exposed questionable practices in certain license plate agencies and at the Oklahoma Department of Human Services. He also introduced modern auditing techniques that included operational reviews of audited agencies financial reporting in accordance with generally accepted accounting principles, leading Oklahoma to become the first state to issue comprehensive GAAP-basis general purpose financial statements, using its own staff.

=== County Commissioners scandal ===
In 1980, Daxon cooperated with the Federal Bureau of Investigation in its probe of many Oklahoma county commissioners. By the end of the investigation in 1984, more than 200 people (mostly county commissioners) from 60 of Oklahoma's 77 counties had been convicted of crimes. Most were convicted of taking kickbacks paid by suppliers on orders for county road-building supplies. More than 70 sitting commissioners had to resign in connection with the probe. 69 counties had commissioners resign in the wake of the probe, and 13 counties lost all three of their commissioners in connection with the scandal.

== 1982 gubernatorial campaign ==
Daxon filed to become the Republican nominee for Governor of Oklahoma in 1982. He challenged incumbent Democrat George Nigh. Nigh was ultimately successful in seeking reelection, defeating Daxon 62% to 38%.

== Work for Arthur Andersen ==
Following his defeat in the gubernatorial election, in 1983, Daxon moved his family to McLean, Virginia, and joined accounting giant Arthur Andersen where he served as an adviser on government audits and accounting until 1990. In 1993 Daxon became the Manager of Quality Assurance for Arthur Andersen and oversaw major elements of the Resolution Trust Corporation. His team eliminated a nationally publicized backlog of unreconciled accounts and worked with outside auditors to obtain the RTC's first clean audit opinion. He was also responsible for special projects relating to privatization in state and local government for Arthur Andersen.

=== Orange County Treasurer ===
While employed by Arthur Anderson in 1994, Daxon was appointed as head of a delegation from the firm tasked with providing financial advice to Orange County, California, following an investment fund melt-down which resulted in the loss of at least $1.5 billion through high-risk investments in derivatives, the largest municipal bankruptcy in U.S. history filed under Chapter 9 in December 1994, and the resignation and subsequent criminal prosecution of Orange County Treasurer Robert Citron. Upon arriving in Orange County later that month, he was appointed to a four-month term as interim county treasurer and oversaw the county's efforts to emerge from bankruptcy in June 1995.

== Keating Administration ==
However, shortly after Republican Frank Keating was elected Governor of Oklahoma in November 1994, Keating had asked Daxon to be his budget director. For Daxon to be able to accept the California assignment, then Governor of California Pete Wilson called Keating and asked if California could borrow Daxon to help sort out the Orange County mess. Keating agreed to a 4-month loan of Daxon's services. Daxon returned to Oklahoma full-time in April 1995 to serve as Keating's budget director. In that position, Daxon was responsible for overseeing the developing and implementation of the Keating's annual state budget.

Concurrent with his service as State Finance Director, Keating appointed Daxon as Oklahoma Secretary of Finance and Revenue. As Finance Secretary, Daxon was responsible for developing Keating's economic and tax policies as well as providing oversight to the State's finance agencies, including the Oklahoma Tax Commission, the Oklahoma State Banking Department, the Oklahoma Department of Consumer Credit, the Oklahoma Department of Securities, and the Oklahoma Department of Insurance.

Daxon remained as Finance Secretary for Keating's entire eight years as governor.

== Other governmental service ==
=== Corporation Commission ===
When Democrat Brad Henry was elected governor, Daxon was appointed interim general administrator for the Oklahoma Corporation Commission. Daxon served in that position from January to June 2003.

=== Opportunity Oklahoma ===
Daxon resigned from the Corporation Commission to become the Executive Director of Opportunity Oklahoma, an Oklahoma City business organization designed to help state officials create an environment conducive for economic growth. He remained in that position until 2005.

=== Oklahoma House of Representatives ===
In the 2004 Oklahoma general election, Republicans gained a majority in the Oklahoma House of Representatives for the first time since 1921. Speaker of the Oklahoma House of Representatives-elect Todd Hiett (R-Kellyville) appointed Daxon Director of the House Office of Budget and Performance Review. As Director, he provided fiscal analysis to the House speaker and Appropriation and Budget committee chairmen and oversaw all performance reviews of state agency operations.

== Oklahoma Republican Party ==
Daxon was elected Chairman of the Oklahoma Republican Party in 2006 and served for one year, during which time the Republican Party picked up additional legislative seats in the 2006 fall elections. Daxon was succeeded as chairman by Gary Jones in April 2007.

== Endorsement of Gary Johnson ==
Unable to support GOP nominee Donald Trump, Daxon chose to back Libertarian Party presidential candidate Gary Johnson in the 2016 presidential election.

== Personal life ==
Daxon was married to the former Linda Wright of Emporia, Kansas, from 1972 until his death in 2022. They had two sons: Ben and Johnny. Ben is an anesthesiologist who heads the Critical Care Fellowship program at The Mayo Clinic in Rochester, Minnesota. Johnny is nuclear medicine technologist and works in Oklahoma City.

== See also ==
- List of Republicans who opposed the Donald Trump 2016 presidential campaign

Political offices
Preceded by John M. Rogers	Oklahoma State Auditor and Inspector; January 8, 1979 – January 10, 1983	Succeeded by Clifton Scott
Preceded by Robert Citron	Interim County Treasurer for Orange County, California; December 22, 1994 – March 17, 1995	Succeeded by John Moorlach
Preceded by	Oklahoma Secretary of Finance and Revenue; Under Governor Frank Keating; March 17, 1995 – January 13, 2003	Succeeded by Scott Meacham
Preceded by	Oklahoma Director of State Finance; Under Governor Frank Keating; March 17, 1995 – January 13, 2003	Succeeded by Scott Meacham
Party political offices
Preceded by Johnny L. Green	Republican nominee for Auditor of Oklahoma; 1978	Succeeded by Dale Wallis
Preceded by Ron Shotts	Republican nominee for Governor of Oklahoma; 1982	Succeeded by Henry Bellmon
Preceded by Gary Jones	Chairman of the Oklahoma Republican Party; 2006–2008	Succeeded by Gary Jones
