= Protection policy =

Protection policy may refer to:

Policies

- Information protection policy
- Data protection policy
- Planetary protection policy
- Whistleblower protection policy
- Environmental protection policy
- Farmland protection policy
- Child protection policy
- Cultural heritage protection policy

Finance

- Income protection policy
- Payment protection policy
- Tax protection policy
- Protectionism, a trade protection policy

Technology

- Executable space protection policy
