= 2026 Oklahoma State Treasurer election =

- November 3, 2026
Nominee	Cindy Byrd	Kiefer Perry
Party	Republican	Libertarian
Popular vote	780,978	255,029
Percentage	75.4%	24.6%
- Byrd: 50–60% 60–70% 70–80% 80–90% >90% Perry: 50–60% 60–70% 70–80% 80–90% >90% Tie: 50% No votes
State Treasurer before election
Todd Russ
Republican
Elected State Treasurer
TBD

The 2026 Oklahoma State Treasurer election took place on November 3, 2026, to elect the Oklahoma State Treasurer. Incumbent Republican State Treasurer Todd Russ ran for re-election to a second term in office, but lost renomination to state auditor Cindy Byrd. Primary elections were held on June 16, 2026.

== Republican primary ==
=== Candidates ===
==== Nominee ====
- Cindy Byrd, state auditor (2019–present)

==== Eliminated in primary ====
- Todd Russ, incumbent state treasurer (2023–present)

=== Polling ===
Poll source	Date(s) administered	Sample size (Note: Key: A – all adults RV – registered voters LV – likely voters V – unclear)	Margin of error	Cindy Byrd	Todd Russ	Undecided
Cole Hargrave Snodgrass & Associates	April 26–29, 2026	500 (RV)	± 4.3%	39%	22%	39%

=== Results ===
Unofficial primary results by county: Byrd: 50–60%; 60–70%; 70–80%; 80–90%; Russ: 50–60%; 60–70%

Republican primary results
Party	Candidate	Votes	%
Republican	Cindy Byrd	232,773	61.7
Republican	Todd Russ (incumbent)	144,780	38.3
Total votes		377,553	100.0

== Third-party and independent candidates ==
=== Candidates ===
==== Declared ====
- Kiefer Perry (Libertarian)

== Results ==
2026 Oklahoma State Treasurer election
Party	Candidate	Votes	%	±%
Republican	Cindy Byrd	780,978	75.38	+10.61
Libertarian	Kiefer Perry	255,029	24.62	+20.07
Total votes		1,036,007	100.0	
Republican hold				
