= Clark Jolley =

American politician

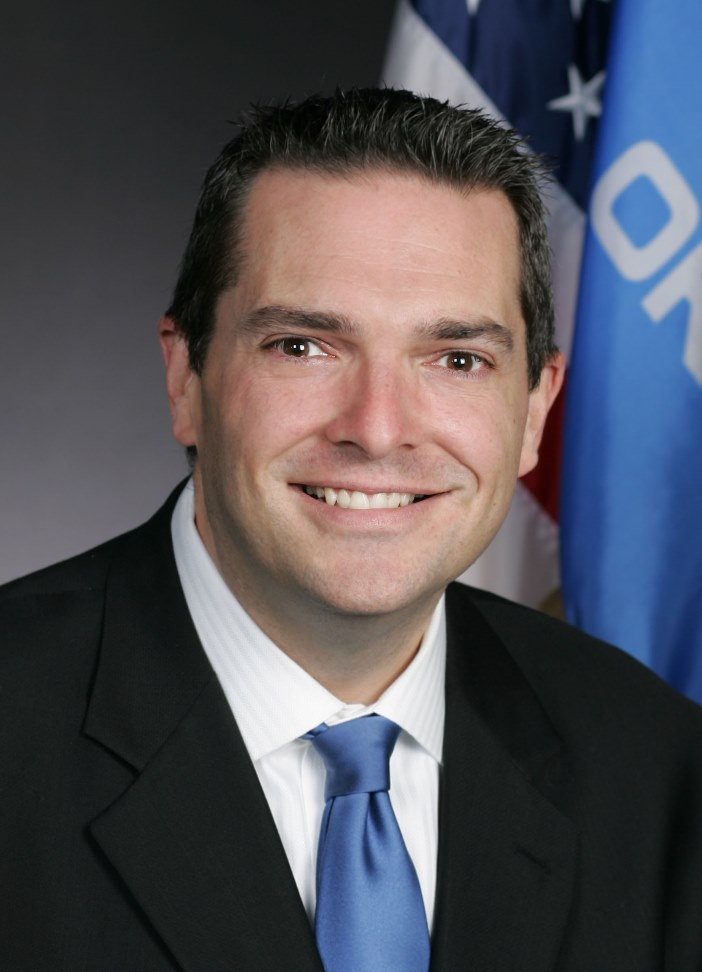

Member of the Oklahoma Tax Commission
- In office March 29, 2017 – November 1, 2021
- Preceded by: Dawn Cash
- Succeeded by: Mark Wood

Oklahoma Secretary of Finance, Administration and Information Technology
- In office February 28, 2018 – January 14, 2019
- Preceded by: Preston Doerflinger
- Succeeded by: Position abolished

Member of the Oklahoma Senate from the 41st district
- In office November 17, 2004 – November 22, 2016
- Preceded by: Mark Snyder
- Succeeded by: Adam Pugh

Personal details
- Born: September 7, 1970 (age 55) Oklahoma City, Oklahoma, U.S.
- Party: Republican
- Education: Oklahoma Baptist University (BME); Oklahoma Baptist University (BA); University of Oklahoma (JD)
- Website: Official website

Clark Jolley is an American Republican politician. He is a former Oklahoma State Senator, Oklahoma Secretary of Finance, Administration and Information Technology, and the former chairman of the Oklahoma Tax Commission. A Certified Financial Planner and Chartered Financial Consultant (ChFC), he currently runs a Financial Services firm at Northwestern Mutual.

== Early life and career ==
Born in Oklahoma City, Oklahoma, Jolley graduated from Del City High School in 1988 and earned Music Education and Political Science degrees from Oklahoma Baptist University in Shawnee, Oklahoma in 1992. He received his Juris Doctor from the University of Oklahoma in 1995.

After graduating from the University of Oklahoma Jolley established a private law practice and went on to serve an administrative law judge for the Oklahoma Department of Labor. He was also a barrister member of the Robert J. Turner American Inn of Court.

== Political career ==
Jolley was first elected to the Oklahoma Senate in 2004. District 41 then included large portions of Edmond, north Oklahoma City and southern Logan County. He was re-elected in 2008 and again in 2012. After the redistricting in 2011 (which Jolley co-chaired), District 41 included areas of Edmond, north Oklahoma City and Arcadia in Oklahoma County. Jolley was elected by his colleagues to serve as Republican Whip in 2007–2008 and then elected to the office of Assistant Majority Leader in 2009. He was re-elected to the Assistant Majority Leader position until he resigned in 2012, after he was appointed the Chairman of Appropriations. Jolley served the last five sessions as Chair of the Senate Appropriations Committee. In one of his last legislative acts, Jolley authored State Question 792, which was approved by the voters in November 2016 to modernize alcohol laws and place full-strength beer and wine in grocery stores.

In March 2017, he was nominated by Governor Mary Fallin and confirmed by the Oklahoma State Senate as an Oklahoma Tax Commissioner to fill a partial term created when former Commissioner Dawn Cash resigned to accept the position of First Assistant Attorney General under Oklahoma Attorney General Michael J. Hunter.

On February 28, 2018, Jolley was appointed to serve as the Oklahoma Secretary of Finance, Administration and Information Technology by Governor Mary Fallin.

Governor Kevin Stitt named Jolley as the chairman of the Tax Commission on April 15, 2021.

On October 1, 2021, Jolley tendered his resignation as Chairman of the Oklahoma Tax Commission effective November 1, 2021. On November 20, 2021, Stitt named Oklahoma City accountant Mark Wood to succeed Jolley.

He announced his candidacy for Oklahoma State Treasurer on November 9, 2021. After a second-place finish in the Republican Primary Runoff election, Jolley endorsed the Republican nominee.

Jolley was named a member of the Oklahoma Health Care Authority Board in December 2023 by the President Pro Tempore of the Oklahoma Senate.

== Personal life ==
Jolley and his wife have four children and reside in Edmond, Oklahoma. Jolley serves as an adjunct professor at both Oklahoma Christian University and Mid-America Christian University.

== Election results ==
2022 Oklahoma state treasurer election republican primary results
Party	Candidate	Votes	%
Republican	Todd Russ	164,376	48.5
Republican	Clark Jolley	114,776	33.9
Republican	David Hooten	59,721	17.6
Total votes		338,873	100.0

2022 Oklahoma state treasurer election republican primary runoff results
Party	Candidate	Votes	%
Republican	Todd Russ	150,431	55.5
Republican	Clark Jolley	120,561	44.5
Total votes		270,992	100.0

June 24, 2014, Election results for United States House of Representatives for District 5
Candidates	Party	Votes	%
Steve Russell	Republican Party	14,604	26.57%
Patrice Douglas	Republican Party	13,445	24.46%
Clark Jolley	Republican Party	9,232	16.80%
Mike Turner	Republican Party	7,760	14.12%
Shane David Jett	Republican Party	7,022	12.78%
Harvey Sparks	Republican Party	2,898	5.27%

November 6, 2012, Election results for Oklahoma State Senator for District 41
Candidates	Party	Votes	%
Clark Jolley	Republican Party	27,380	79.4%
Richard Prawdzienski	Independent	7,103	20.6%

June 26, 2012, Election results for Oklahoma State Senator for District 41
Candidates	Party	Votes	%
Clark Jolley	Republican Party	4,385	56.61%
Paul Blair	Republican Party	3,361	43.39%

November 4, 2008, Election results for Oklahoma State Senator for District 41
Candidates	Party	Votes	%
Clark Jolley	Republican Party	29,794	72.25%
David Taylor	Democratic Party	11,446	27.75%

November 2, 2004, Election results for Oklahoma State Senator for District 41
Candidates	Party	Votes	%
Clark Jolley	Republican Party	26,517	69.24%
James H. Buxton	Democratic Party	11,778	30.76%
