= Robert Dunlop (Oklahoma politician) =

American politician

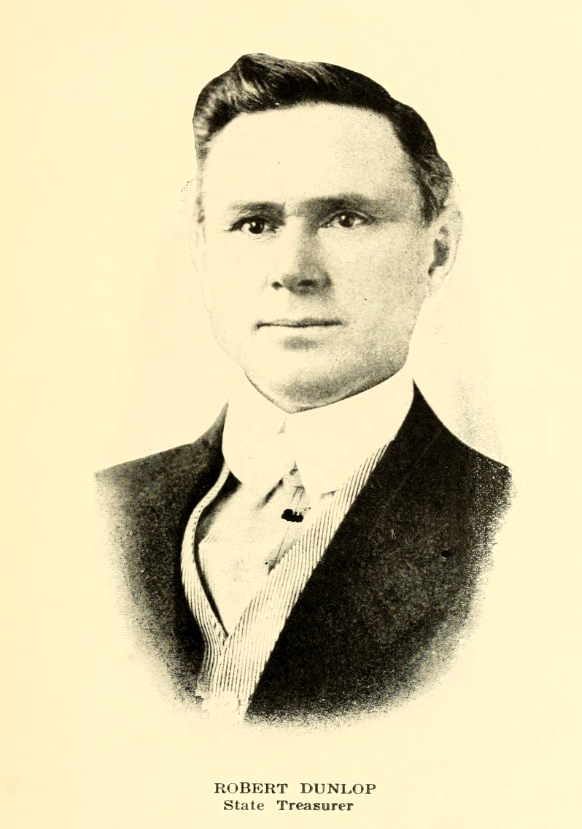

2nd Oklahoma State Treasurer
- In office January 9, 1911 – January 11, 1915
- Governor: Lee Cruce
- Preceded by: James Menefee
- Succeeded by: William Lee Alexander

Kay County Treasurer
- In office 1902–1906

Personal details
- Born: 1869 Garnett, Kansas, U.S.
- Died: Unknown
- Political party: Democratic Party

Robert Dunlop was an American politician who served as the Oklahoma State Treasurer from January 9, 1911, to January 11, 1915.

== Biography ==
Robert Dunlop was born in 1869 in Garnett, Kansas to Scottish immigrant parents from Dunlop and Kelso. He moved to Oklahoma Territory in 1889, eventually settling in Kay County, Oklahoma where he was elected county treasurer in 1902 and reelected in 1904. He lost the 1907 Oklahoma State Treasurer election to James Menefee. He won the 1910 Oklahoma State Treasurer election. He unsuccessfully ran for the Democratic Party's nomination in the 1914 Oklahoma gubernatorial election.

== Electoral history ==
Oklahoma State Treasurer Democratic primary (August 2, 1910)
Party	Candidate	Votes	%
Democratic	Robert Dunlop	56,348	55.0%
Democratic	Martin E. Trapp	46,233	45.0%
Turnout		102,581	

1910 Oklahoma State Treasurer election
Party	Candidate	Votes	%	±%
Democratic	Robert Dunlop	118,479	49.6%	−5.1%
Republican	W.H. Dill	93,726	39.2%	−2.2%
Socialist	C.B. Boylan	23,697	9.9%	+6.1%
Prohibition	E.H. Leonard	2,827	1.1%	New
Democratic hold		Swing		

Democratic primary results
Party	Candidate	Votes	%
Democratic	Robert L. Williams	33,605	27.1
Democratic	James B. A. Robertson	33,504	25.5
Democratic	Al Jennings	21,732	16.5
Democratic	Robert Dunlap	16,094	12.2
Democratic	Charles West	14,642	11.1
Democratic	F. E. Herting	10,164	7.7
Total votes		131,291	100.00

Party political offices
Preceded by James Menefee	Democratic nominee for Oklahoma State Treasurer; 1910	Succeeded by W. L. Alexander
