= Shape Your Future =

Health campaign in Oklahoma, United States

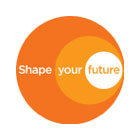
Shape Your Future Logo

Shape Your Future is an Oklahoma-based community health education intervention founded in 2011. It is designed to help Oklahomans eat better, move more and give up smoking. Shape Your Future works with partners and grantees across the state help in an attempt to make Oklahoma an overall healthier place. The organization is also focused on creating healthy living and working environments.

Shape Your Future launched in 2011 and is funded by the Oklahoma Tobacco Settlement Endowment Trust and the Oklahoma State Department of Health. In February 2011, Oklahoma ranked 45th among all states in major health status categories. Shape Your Future was developed specifically for Oklahomans and was created with input from research and focus groups around the state. By January 2014, Oklahoma's rank for overall healthiness improved to 43rd in the United States.

== 5320 Campaign ==
When Shape Your Future first launched, it was announced with a teaser campaign entitled "5320". 5,320 represented the number of lives that could be saved each year if Oklahoma met the national average of health status indicators.

== Goals ==
Shape Your Future promotes improved nutrition, increased physical activity and tobacco-free lifestyles. The Shape Your Future community health education intervention messaging encourages Oklahomans to: fill half their plates with fruits and vegetables at every meal; get the recommended amount of physical activity each day, including 30 minutes for adults and 60 minutes for children; and choose water over sugar-sweetened beverages like soda, sports drinks, juice boxes and energy drinks.

== The Oklahoma Tobacco Helpline ==
In support of its goal to reduce tobacco use in Oklahoma, Shape Your Future encourages tobacco users and their families to call the Oklahoma Tobacco Helpline, a free service available to Oklahomans who are thinking about quitting tobacco.
