= James Menefee =

American politician (1868 or 1869–1927)

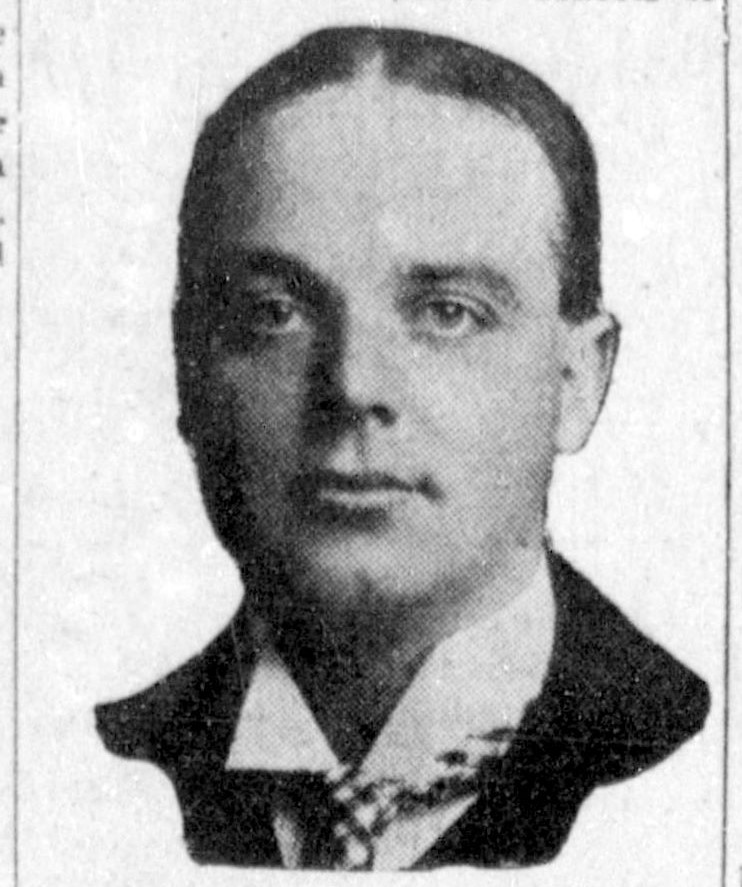

1st Oklahoma State Treasurer
- In office November 16, 1907 – January 1911
- Governor: Charles N. Haskell
- Preceded by: Position established
- Succeeded by: Robert Dunlop

Member of the Oklahoma Territorial Council from the 11th district
- In office 1905 – November 16, 1907
- Preceded by: Thomas P. Gore
- Succeeded by: Position disestablished (replaced by Oklahoma Senate)

Personal details
- Born: 1868 or 1869
- Died: February 19, 1927 (aged 58); Oklahoma City, US
- Political party: Democratic Party

James A. Menefee (1868 or 1869 – February 19, 1927) was an American politician who served as the first Oklahoma State Treasurer from 1907 to 1911. Menefee was active in politics in both Oklahoma Territory and later Oklahoma. He served in the Oklahoma Territorial Senate in 1905 and was the first treasurer of the Oklahoma Democratic Party after Oklahoma statehood.

== Biography ==
James A. Menefee moved to Caddo County in Oklahoma Territory where he worked as a banker. He also served as a territorial senator for the 11th district of the Oklahoma Territory Legislature from 1905 to statehood. In 1907, he was elected the first Oklahoma State Treasurer and served until 1911. He was also the first treasurer of the Oklahoma Democratic Party. In 1918, he was the campaign manager for James B. A. Robertson's successful gubernatorial campaign. He died on February 19, 1927, of heart disease in Oklahoma City.

== Electoral history ==
1907 Oklahoma State Treasurer election
Party	Candidate	Votes	%	±%
Democratic	James Menefee	132,496	54.7	New
Republican	Mortimer F. Stillwell	100,137	41.4	New
Socialist	John B. Ash	9,286	3.8	New
Democratic gain from		Swing	N/A	

Party political offices
First	Democratic nominee for Oklahoma State Treasurer; 1907	Succeeded by Robert Dunlop
