= Oklahoma State Bond Advisor =

Officer of the state of Okhlahoma, United States

Office of the Oklahoma State Bond Advisor
- Great Seal of Oklahoma

Agency overview
- Formed: 2003
- Preceding agency: Oklahoma Department of Central Services
- Headquarters: 9220 N. Kelley Avenue; Oklahoma City, Oklahoma
- Employees: 1 classified 2 unclassified
- Annual budget: $373,175
- Minister responsible: Preston Doerflinger, Secretary of Revenue and Finance
- Agency executive: James C. Joseph chief1_position = State Bond Advisor
- Website: http://www.ok-bonds.state.ok.us

The Oklahoma State Bond Advisor is an officer of the state of Oklahoma who provides advice and assistance to the Governor of Oklahoma on matters relating to capital planning, debt issuance, and debt management. The Office borrows money to operate the Oklahoma state government and manages the resulting debt. The State Bond Advisor serves as the professional staff to the Council on Bond Oversight and assists the Long-Range Capital Planning Commission. The State Bond Advisor is appointed by the Council and serves until removed, for cause, by the Council.

Established in 1987 as an independent office within the Oklahoma Department of Central Services, the Office became a separate state agency in 2003. The current State Bond Advisor is James C. Joseph.

The Office was created in 1987 during the term of Governor Henry Bellmon.

== Leadership ==
The Office of the State Bond Advisor is led by the Oklahoma State Bond Advisor. The State Bond Advisor serves as staff to the Council of Bond Oversight. The Chair of the Council of Bond Oversight is Mark Beffort and James C. Joseph serves as the State Bond Advisor.

== Boards and Commissions ==
=== Council on Bond Oversight ===
The Oklahoma Council on Bond Oversight is the statutory body responsible for reviewing all borrowing requests by State agencies, authorities, departments, and trusts, including public institutions of higher education. Upon approval, the State Bond Advisor is responsible assisting issuers with the sale of the approved bonds.

The Council consists of five members who are not members of the Oklahoma Legislature. Two members are appointed by the Governor of Oklahoma with the approval of the Oklahoma Senate, one is appointed by the Speaker of the Oklahoma House of Representatives, one is appointed by the President pro tempore of the Oklahoma Senate, and the Director of the Office of Management and Enterprise Services serves as the fifth member. Appointed members serve terms of two years and may be removed for cause by the appointing authority. Members may be appointed for additional terms.

As of 2014, the members of the Council are as follows:

- Mark Beffort - Chairman
- Robert M. Jones
- Tom Maxwell
- Blaine Peterson
- Preston Doerflinger, Director of the Office of Management and Enterprise Services

=== Capital Planning Commission ===
The Oklahoma Long-Range Capital Planning Commission is an oversight body created by statute to advise and assist the Oklahoma Legislature in providing for capital facilities in the state. Each year, the Commission prepares a state capital plan for addressing state, regional and local public capital facility needs for the next five years. The Governor of Oklahoma, at the time he prepares the state budget, is to use the state capital plan to prepare a capital budget for consideration by the Oklahoma Legislature. The Office of Management and Enterprise Services provides staff support for the Commission, with assistance from the State Bond Advisor's Office.

The Commission consists of nine members as follows:

- three members are appointed by the Governor to serve at his pleasure and represent the public at large
- three members are appointed by the President Pro Tempore of the Oklahoma Senate to serve at his pleasure, one of whom must be a member of the Oklahoma Senate and two must come from the public
- three members are appointed by the Speaker of the Oklahoma House of Representatives to serve at his pleasure, one of whom must be a member of the Oklahoma House of Representatives and two must come from the public

== See also ==
- Bureau of Public Debt
