= Oklahoma Department of Central Services =

Defunct Oklahoma state government agency

- Great Seal of Oklahoma

Agency overview
- Formed: July 1, 1983
- Preceding agency: Office of Public Affairs
- Dissolved: 2011
- Superseding agency: Office of Management and Enterprise Services
- Headquarters: 2401 N Lincoln Boulevard; Oklahoma City, Oklahoma
- Employees: 221 classified 55 unclassified
- Annual budget: $35 million
- Website: www.ok.gov/DCS

The Oklahoma Department of Central Services (DCS) was an agency of the government of Oklahoma which was dissolved in 2011. DCS was responsible for providing services to help manage and support the basic functioning of all state agencies. DCS provides government-wide purchasing, supplying, operation, and maintenance of state property, buildings, and equipment, and for the sale of surplus items. DCS also manages the state motor vehicle fleet and provides government-wide risk management, printing and distribution, and strategic financial and administrative support.

The Department was created in 1992 during the term of Governor David Walters and then consolidated into the Office of State Finance in 2011 under Governor Mary Fallin.

== Divisions ==
DCS is organized into seven functional divisions:

- Central Purchasing Division
- Office of Facilities Management
- Construction and Properties Division
- Fleet Management Division
- Risk Management Division
- Property Reutilization Division
- Central Printing and Interagency Mail Division

== Facilities ==
The Central Services Department's Facilities Services Division, formerly the Building Management Division, is responsible for operating and maintain seventeen buildings, including the Oklahoma State Capitol and the Oklahoma Governor's Mansion. In total, the Division manages approximately two million square feet.

The following is a list of facilities within the State Capitol Complex under the control of the Division and the agencies they house:

- Oklahoma Governor's Mansion - 820 N.E. 23rd St
  - Governor of Oklahoma
- Oklahoma State Capitol - 2300 N. Lincoln
  - Governor of Oklahoma
  - Lieutenant Governor of Oklahoma
  - Oklahoma House of Representatives
  - Oklahoma Senate
  - Oklahoma Supreme Court
  - Oklahoma Court of Criminal Appeals
  - Oklahoma State Treasurer
  - Oklahoma Secretary of State
  - Oklahoma State Auditor and Inspector
  - Oklahoma Office of State Finance
  - Oklahoma Ethics Commission
  - Oklahoma State Election Board
- Denver Davison Court Building - 1915 N. Stiles
  - Oklahoma Workers Compensation Court
- Neal A. McCaleb Building - 200 N.E. 21st
  - Oklahoma Department of Transportation
- Jim Thorpe Building - 2101 N. Lincoln
  - Oklahoma Office of Personnel Management
  - Oklahoma Corporation Commission
- Department of Agriculture Building - 2800 N. Lincoln
  - Oklahoma Department of Agriculture, Food, and Forestry
  - Oklahoma Conservation Commission
- State Banking Department Building - 2900 N. Lincoln
  - Oklahoma State Banking Department
- M. C. Connors Building - 2501 N. 25th
  - Oklahoma Tax Commission
- Oliver Hodge Education Building - 2500 N 25th
  - Oklahoma State Department of Education
- Sequoyah Building - 2400 N. 24th
  - Oklahoma Department of Human Services
- Will Rogers Building - 2401 N. 24th
  - Oklahoma Employment Security Commission
  - Oklahoma Department of Central Services
  - Oklahoma Department of Emergency Management
- Attorney General Building - 313 N.E. 21st
  - Oklahoma Attorney General

The following is a list of major state facilities not under the control of the Division and the agencies they house:

- Department of Public Safety Building - 3600 N. Martin Luther King
  - Oklahoma Department of Public Safety
- Department of Corrections Building - 3400 N. Martin Luther King
  - Oklahoma Department of Corrections
- Department of Health Building - 120 N. Robinson
  - Oklahoma State Department of Health
  - Oklahoma Department of Tourism and Recreation
- Department of Commerce Building - 900 N. Stiles
  - Oklahoma Department of Commerce
- Department of Mental Health Building - 1200 NE. 13th
  - Oklahoma Department of Mental Health and Substance Abuse Services
- Lincoln Plaza Office Complex - 4545 N. Lincoln
  - Oklahoma Health Care Authority
  - Oklahoma Department of Consumer Credit
- Department of Environmental Quality Building - 707 N. Robinson
  - Oklahoma Department of Environmental Quality

== Staffing ==
The Central Services Department, with an annual budget of over $60 million, is one of the larger employers of the State. For fiscal year 2011, the Department was authorized 248 full-time employees.

Division	Number of Employees
Administration Division	9
Core Services Central Purchasing Division Office of Facilities Management Construction and Properties Division Property Reutilization Division	178
Public Employees Relations Board	1
Capitol Medical Zonning Commission	1
Federal Property Distribution	8
Central Printing Division	16
Fleet Management Division	22
Alternative Fuels	1
Risk Management Division	12
Total	248

== Supporting agencies ==
- State Capitol Preservation Commission
- Oklahoma Capitol Improvement Authority
- Capitol-Medical Center Improvement and Zoning Commission
- State Use Program
- Public Employees Relations Board

== See also ==
- General Services Administration
