= Oklahoma Police Pension and Retirement System =

- Great Seal of Oklahoma

Agency overview
- Formed: 1980
- Preceding agency: Policemen's Pension Benefit Program
- Headquarters: 1001 NW 63 Street; Oklahoma City, Oklahoma
- Employees: 12 unclassified
- Annual budget: $175 million
- Ministers responsible: Scott Meacham, Secretary of Finance and Revenue; Craig Akard, Chair of the Board
- Agency executive: Ginger Sigler, Executive Director
- Parent agency: Board of Trustees
- Website: Oklahoma Police Pension and Retirement System

The Oklahoma Police Pension and Retirement System (OPPRS) is an agency of the government of Oklahoma that manages the public pension system for municipal police officers in Oklahoma. The System provides pension benefits such as normal retirement, disability retirement, surviving spouse benefits and a death benefit.

The System receives its funding from employer and member contributions, a portion of the state insurance premium tax and returns on investments. The System is overseen by a 13-member Board of Trustees, which is responsible for governing the System and appointing the Executive Director to run the System.

The System was created in 1980 during the term of Governor of Oklahoma George Nigh.

== Leadership ==
The System is oversee by the Oklahoma Secretary of Finance and Revenue. Under Governor of Oklahoma Brad Henry, Scott Meacham is currently serving as Secretary.

== Board of trustees ==
The System is governed by a thirteen-member Board of Trustees. The Board members are appointed as follows:

- 6 members elected by the active members of the System (elected by District) who are active members of the System
- 1 member elected by the inactive members of the System (elected Statewide) who is an inactive member of the System
- 1 member appointed by the Speaker of the Oklahoma House of Representatives
- 1 member appointed by the President pro tempore of the Oklahoma Senate
- 1 member appointed by the Governor of Oklahoma
- 1 member appointed by the Oklahoma Municipal League
- 1 member is the Oklahoma Insurance Commissioner (or designee)
- 1 member is the Director of State Finance (or designee)
