= 1982 Oklahoma gubernatorial election =

- November 2, 1982
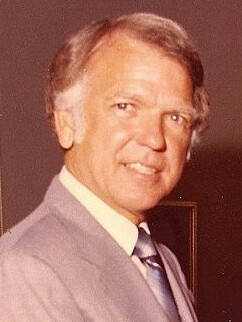

Nominee	George Nigh	Tom Daxon
Party	Democratic	Republican
Popular vote	548,159	332,207
Percentage	62.07%	37.62%
- County results Nigh: 50–60% 60–70% 70–80% 80–90%
Governor before election
George Nigh
Democratic
Elected Governor
George Nigh
Democratic

The 1982 Oklahoma gubernatorial election was held on November 2, 1982, and was a race for Governor of Oklahoma. Democrat George Nigh won re-election by a substantial majority over the Republican, former State Auditor and Inspector Tom Daxon. This is the most recent gubernatorial election in which a candidate carried every county in the state.

With Nigh's victory, he became the first Oklahoma governor to serve two consecutive terms.

== Primary election ==
Primary elections were held on August 24, 1982 with runoffs occurring on September 21, 1982, although no runoffs were required in the gubernatorial race.

=== Democratic party ===
==== Candidates ====
- Howard L. Bell
- George Nigh, incumbent governor

==== Results ====
Democratic primary results
Party	Candidate	Votes	%
Democratic	George Nigh (incumbent)	379,301	82.63%
Democratic	Howard L. Bell	79,735	17.37%
Total votes		459,036	100.00%

=== Republican party ===
==== Candidates ====
- Tom Daxon, Oklahoma State Auditor and Inspector
- Don House
- Neal A. McCaleb, minority leader of Oklahoma House of Representatives

==== Results ====
Republican primary results
Party	Candidate	Votes	%
Republican	Tom Daxon	73,677	64.72%
Republican	Neal A. McCaleb	35,379	31.08%
Republican	Don House	4,790	4.21%
Total votes		113,846	100.00%

== General election ==
=== Endorsements ===
George Nigh (D)

Labor Unions

- United Auto Workers of Oklahoma

=== Results ===
1982 Oklahoma gubernatorial election
Party	Candidate	Votes	%	±%
Democratic	George Nigh (incumbent)	548,159	62.07%	+10.33%
Republican	Tom Daxon	332,207	37.62%	−9.60%
Independent	Allah-U-Akbar Allah-U Wahid	2,764	0.31%	
Total votes		883,130	100.00%	
Majority		215,952	24.45%	
Democratic hold		Swing	+19.93%	

=== Results by county ===
This is the most recent gubernatorial election in which Beaver County and Texas County have backed the Democratic candidate.

County	George Nigh Democratic		Tom Daxon Republican		Allah-U Wahid Independent		Margin		Total votes cast
County	#	%	#	%	#	%	#	%	Total votes cast
Adair	4,112	67.55%	1,965	32.28%	10	0.16%	2,147	35.27%	6,087
Alfalfa	1,969	66.01%	1,012	33.93%	2	0.07%	957	32.08%	2,983
Atoka	3,351	84.20%	624	15.68%	5	0.13%	2,727	68.52%	3,980
Beaver	1,471	63.79%	832	36.08%	3	0.13%	639	27.71%	2,306
Beckham	3,765	72.33%	1,439	27.65%	1	0.02%	2,326	44.69%	5,205
Blaine	2,840	62.01%	1,736	37.90%	4	0.09%	1,104	24.10%	4,580
Bryan	6,928	84.79%	1,234	15.10%	9	0.11%	5,694	69.69%	8,171
Caddo	5,907	72.73%	2,204	27.14%	11	0.14%	3,703	45.59%	8,122
Canadian	9,290	54.07%	7,872	45.82%	19	0.11%	1,418	8.25%	17,181
Carter	8,404	68.94%	3,772	30.94%	15	0.12%	4,632	38.00%	12,191
Cherokee	5,933	69.00%	2,645	30.76%	20	0.23%	3,288	38.24%	8,598
Choctaw	3,420	81.14%	784	18.60%	11	0.26%	2,636	62.54%	4,215
Cimarron	937	56.07%	729	43.63%	5	0.30%	208	12.45%	1,671
Cleveland	21,381	56.97%	16,080	42.84%	70	0.19%	5,301	14.12%	37,531
Coal	1,536	82.85%	313	16.88%	5	0.27%	1,223	65.97%	1,854
Comanche	15,111	72.07%	5,824	27.78%	33	0.16%	9,287	44.29%	20,968
Cotton	1,804	79.51%	461	20.32%	4	0.18%	1,343	59.19%	2,269
Craig	3,417	77.62%	976	22.17%	9	0.20%	2,441	55.45%	4,402
Creek	10,088	64.29%	5,583	35.58%	20	0.13%	4,505	28.71%	15,691
Custer	5,208	67.16%	2,546	32.83%	1	0.01%	2,662	34.33%	7,755
Delaware	6,167	72.53%	2,320	27.28%	16	0.19%	3,847	45.24%	8,503
Dewey	1,472	64.85%	794	34.98%	4	0.18%	678	29.87%	2,270
Ellis	1,254	63.72%	712	36.18%	2	0.10%	542	27.54%	1,968
Garfield	9,956	54.62%	8,265	45.34%	8	0.04%	1,691	9.28%	18,229
Garvin	6,690	70.22%	2,833	29.74%	4	0.04%	3,857	40.48%	9,527
Grady	7,059	65.51%	3,707	34.40%	10	0.09%	3,352	31.11%	10,776
Grant	1,834	65.45%	967	34.51%	1	0.04%	867	30.94%	2,802
Greer	1,927	76.65%	586	23.31%	1	0.04%	1,341	53.34%	2,514
Harmon	1,189	80.99%	279	19.01%	0	0.00%	910	61.99%	1,468
Harper	1,186	64.00%	664	35.83%	3	0.16%	522	28.17%	1,853
Haskell	3,123	78.41%	855	21.47%	5	0.13%	2,268	56.94%	3,983
Hughes	3,501	77.59%	1,002	22.21%	9	0.20%	2,499	55.39%	4,512
Jackson	5,153	76.48%	1,583	23.49%	2	0.03%	3,570	52.98%	6,738
Jefferson	1,823	79.57%	465	20.30%	3	0.13%	1,357	59.28%	2,291
Johnston	2,648	81.98%	573	17.74%	9	0.28%	2,075	64.24%	3,230
Kay	10,283	57.68%	7,526	42.21%	20	0.11%	2,757	15.46%	17,829
Kingfisher	3,127	55.93%	2,455	43.91%	9	0.16%	672	12.02%	5,591
Kiowa	3,119	77.22%	917	22.70%	3	0.07%	2,202	54.52%	4,039
Latimer	2,364	77.64%	679	22.30%	2	0.07%	1,685	55.34%	3,045
Le Flore	9,552	82.14%	2,058	17.70%	19	0.16%	7,494	64.44%	11,629
Lincoln	5,436	59.64%	3,665	40.21%	13	0.14%	1,771	19.43%	9,114
Logan	4,722	58.06%	3,391	41.69%	20	0.25%	1,331	16.37%	8,133
Love	2,717	85.55%	452	14.23%	7	0.22%	2,265	71.32%	3,176
Major	1,799	60.65%	1,164	39.24%	3	0.10%	635	21.41%	2,966
Marshall	3,246	79.27%	843	20.59%	6	0.15%	2,403	58.68%	4,095
Mayes	7,002	69.67%	3,034	30.19%	14	0.14%	3,968	39.48%	10,050
McClain	4,099	64.71%	2,230	35.21%	5	0.08%	1,869	29.51%	6,334
McCurtain	4,562	73.44%	1,641	26.42%	9	0.14%	2,921	47.02%	6,212
McIntosh	4,310	74.71%	1,454	25.20%	5	0.09%	2,856	49.51%	5,769
Murray	2,903	73.72%	1,033	26.23%	2	0.05%	1,870	47.49%	3,938
Muskogee	13,781	69.63%	5,984	30.24%	26	0.13%	7,797	39.40%	19,791
Noble	2,579	58.35%	1,834	41.49%	7	0.16%	745	16.86%	4,420
Nowata	2,756	70.98%	1,122	28.90%	5	0.13%	1,634	42.08%	3,883
Okfuskee	2,295	69.80%	985	29.96%	8	0.24%	1,310	39.84%	3,288
Oklahoma	83,706	52.48%	74,087	46.45%	1,704	1.07%	9,619	6.03%	159,497
Okmulgee	8,140	72.66%	3,052	27.24%	11	0.10%	5,088	45.42%	11,203
Osage	7,576	67.29%	3,667	32.57%	16	0.14%	3,909	34.72%	11,259
Ottawa	7,497	78.30%	2,069	21.61%	9	0.09%	5,428	56.69%	9,575
Pawnee	2,905	59.01%	2,007	40.77%	11	0.22%	898	18.24%	4,923
Payne	10,804	60.24%	7,093	39.55%	39	0.22%	3,711	20.69%	17,936
Pittsburg	9,352	78.91%	2,480	20.93%	19	0.16%	6,872	57.99%	11,851
Pontotoc	7,481	71.66%	2,953	28.29%	5	0.05%	4,528	43.38%	10,439
Pottawatomie	11,508	65.97%	5,920	33.94%	16	0.09%	5,588	32.03%	17,444
Pushmataha	2,785	80.28%	678	19.54%	6	0.17%	2,107	60.74%	3,469
Roger Mills	1,154	70.19%	484	29.44%	6	0.36%	670	40.75%	1,644
Rogers	8,775	61.66%	5,441	38.23%	15	0.11%	3,334	23.43%	14,231
Seminole	5,447	72.68%	2,036	27.17%	11	0.15%	3,411	45.52%	7,494
Sequoyah	5,889	79.86%	1,473	19.98%	12	0.16%	4,416	59.89%	7,374
Stephens	9,827	70.40%	4,123	29.54%	8	0.06%	5,704	40.87%	13,958
Texas	2,852	55.75%	2,254	44.06%	10	0.20%	598	11.69%	5,116
Tillman	2,742	76.91%	821	23.03%	2	0.06%	1,921	53.88%	3,565
Tulsa	71,098	51.08%	67,784	48.70%	310	0.22%	3,314	2.38%	139,192
Wagoner	7,142	62.35%	4,303	37.56%	10	0.09%	2,839	24.78%	11,455
Washington	9,946	56.24%	7,722	43.66%	18	0.10%	2,224	12.57%	17,686
Washita	2,848	69.55%	1,245	30.40%	2	0.05%	1,603	39.15%	4,095
Woods	2,630	61.09%	1,670	38.79%	5	0.12%	960	22.30%	4,305
Woodward	3,549	62.34%	2,142	37.63%	2	0.04%	1,407	24.71%	5,693
Totals	548,159	62.07%	332,207	37.62%	2,764	0.31%	215,952	24.45%	883,130

==== Counties that flipped from Republican to Democratic ====
- Alfalfa
- Beaver
- Beckham
- Blaine
- Canadian
- Cimarron
- Cleveland
- Custer
- Dewey
- Ellis
- Garfield
- Grant
- Harper
- Kay
- Kingfisher
- Lincoln
- Logan
- Major
- Noble
- Oklahoma
- Roger Mills
- Tulsa
- Washington
- Washita
- Woods
- Woodward
