= Todd Russ =

American politician (born 1961)

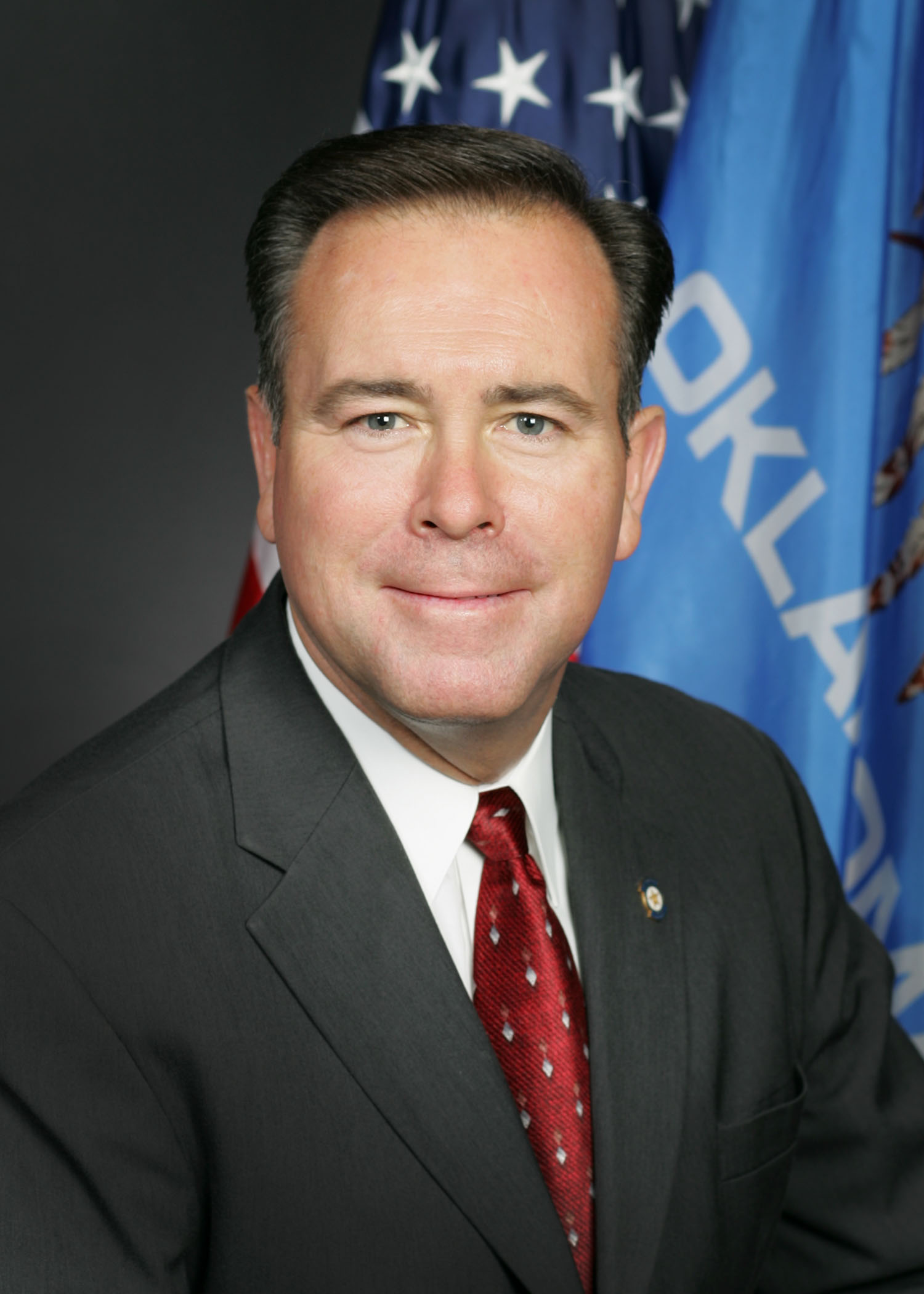

20th Treasurer of Oklahoma
- Incumbent
- Assumed office January 9, 2023
- Governor: Kevin Stitt
- Preceded by: Randy McDaniel

Member of the Oklahoma House of Representatives from the 55th district
- In office October 21, 2009 – November 16, 2022
- Preceded by: Ryan McMullen
- Succeeded by: Nick Archer

Personal details
- Born: January 8, 1961 (age 65)
- Party: Republican
- Education: Southwestern Oklahoma State University (BS); University of Colorado, Denver; Berean Bible College (DMin)

Todd Russ (born January 8, 1961) is an American politician who has served as the Treasurer of Oklahoma since 2023. A Republican, he previously served in the Oklahoma House of Representatives representing the 55th district from 2009 to 2022. He was term limited from the Oklahoma Legislature in 2022.

== Career ==
He was first elected in a 2009 special election after Ryan McMullen resigned for a federal agricultural position. He was the first Republican to represent the district.

In January 2022, Russ announced his campaign for Oklahoma state treasurer. He won the November general election to become the Oklahoma State Treasurer in 2022.

In the 2026 Oklahoma State Treasurer election, he faces a primary challenge by state auditor Cindy Byrd.

== Electoral history ==
=== 2006 ===
Oklahoma Senate District 26 Election
Party	Candidate	Votes	%
Democratic	Tom Ivester	9,386	50.74%
Republican	Todd Russ	9,111	49.26%
Total votes		18,497	100.0

=== 2009 ===
Oklahoma House District 55 Special Election Primary
Party	Candidate	Votes	%
Republican	Todd Russ	1,046	89.33%
Republican	Jeff Ledford	125	10.68%
Total votes		1,171	100.0

Oklahoma House District 55 Special Election
Party	Candidate	Votes	%
Republican	Todd Russ	3,029	55.92%
Democratic	Larry Peck	2,388	44.08%
Total votes		5,417	100.0

=== 2010, 2012, and 2014 ===
Russ ran unopposed for re-election.

=== 2016 ===
Oklahoma House District 55 General Election
Party	Candidate	Votes	%
Republican	Todd Russ (incumbent)	8,052	58.66%
Democratic	Wayne A. Walters	5,675	41.34%
Total votes		13,727	100.0

=== 2018 ===
Oklahoma House District 55 General Election
Party	Candidate	Votes	%
Republican	Todd Russ (incumbent)	5,698	52.74%
Democratic	Dennis Dugger	5,106	47.26%
Total votes		10,804	100.0

=== 2020 ===
Oklahoma House District 55 General Election
Party	Candidate	Votes	%
Republican	Todd Russ (incumbent)	11,283	79.77%
Democratic	Austin Gipson-Black	2,861	20.23%
Total votes		14,144	100.0

=== 2022 ===
2022 Oklahoma state treasurer election republican primary results
Party	Candidate	Votes	%
Republican	Todd Russ	164,376	48.5
Republican	Clark Jolley	114,776	33.9
Republican	David Hooten	59,721	17.6
Total votes		338,873	100.0

2022 Oklahoma state treasurer election republican primary runoff results
Party	Candidate	Votes	%
Republican	Todd Russ	150,431	55.5
Republican	Clark Jolley	120,561	44.5
Total votes		270,992	100.0

2022 Oklahoma state treasurer election
Party	Candidate	Votes	%	±%
Republican	Todd Russ	738,545	64.77%	−6.81%
Democratic	Charles de Coune	349,876	30.68%	N/A
Libertarian	Gregory Sadler	51,858	4.55%	N/A
Total votes		1,140,279	100%	

Party political offices
Preceded by Randy McDaniel	Republican nominee for Oklahoma State Treasurer; 2022	Succeeded by Cindy Byrd
Political offices
Preceded by Randy McDaniel	Treasurer of Oklahoma; 2023–present	Incumbent
