= Oklahoma Tobacco Settlement Endowment Trust =

Oklahoma public trust

Oklahoma Tobacco Settlement Endowment Trust (TSET)
- Tobacco Settlement Endowment Trust

Agency overview
- Formed: July 1, 2001
- Headquarters: 2800 N. Lincoln Blvd. Suite 202; Oklahoma City, Oklahoma
- Employees: 23
- Annual budget: $49.3 million
- Ministers responsible: Bruce Benjamin, Chair of the Board of Directors; Randy McDaniel, Chair of the Board of Investors
- Agency executive: Julie Bisbee, Executive Director
- Website: tset.ok.gov

The Oklahoma Tobacco Settlement Endowment Trust is a public trust created by the State of Oklahoma to manage any money from settlements or lawsuits against any tobacco company. Its creation can be attributed to a decision by Oklahoma voters in November 2000 to constitutionally set aside and protect the majority of settlement funds as an endowment trust fund. The statewide ballot question ensured that only earnings on investments from the TSET were to be spent and then only for tobacco prevention, cancer research, and other health-related programs. The Trust uses the money, through grants and programs, to improve the health and quality of life of all Oklahomans by funding programs and services that address, prevent and reduce tobacco use and obesity – health behaviors that contribute to the leading causes of death in Oklahoma, cancer and cardiovascular disease. TSET has statewide grants, local community-based grants and public health education interventions that include Oklahoma Tobacco Helpline, Tobacco Stops With Me and Shape Your Future.

== Grants ==
TSET is a state grant-making trust. TSET's grants focus on preventing tobacco use, reducing tobacco use and preventing obesity.

=== Funding Opportunities ===
TSET provides grants to improve health. Conference and training grants are available. Requests for proposals are issued for major grant awards.

== Leadership ==
=== Board of Investors ===
The assets of the Trust are invested at the direction of a five-member Board of Investors. The Board consists of the State Treasurer of Oklahoma, who serves as chair, and the designees of the Governor of Oklahoma, the Oklahoma Speaker of the House, the President Pro Tempore of the Oklahoma Senate, and the Oklahoma State Auditor and Inspector. The State Treasurer serves on the Board as long while in office. Appointed members serve four-year terms.

As of January 2020, the Board of Investors is composed of the following:

- Randy McDaniel – State Treasurer and Chair
- Deborah Mueggenborg – appointed by the President Pro Tempore of the Oklahoma Senate and Vice-Chair
- Brenda Bolander, CPA – appointed by the Oklahoma State Auditor and Inspector
- William Schonacher – appointed by the Oklahoma Speaker of the House
- Tyson Goetz – appointed by the Governor of Oklahoma

=== Board of directors ===
The Trust is governed by a seven-member Board of Directors. The members are appointed by seven different elected officials: the Governor of Oklahoma, the Oklahoma Speaker of the House, the President Pro Tempore of the Oklahoma Senate, the Attorney General of Oklahoma, the State Treasurer, the Oklahoma Superintendent of Public Instruction and the Oklahoma State Auditor and Inspector. All members serve seven-year terms.

The Board of Directors is responsible for directing the earnings from the Trust to fund programs to improve the health and well-being of all Oklahomans, especially children and senior adults. As specified in the Constitution, at least one appointee must be appointed from each Congressional district, and not more than two appointees may be appointed from any single Congressional district. In addition, not more than four appointees may be from any one political party. All appointees must have demonstrated expertise in public or private health care or programs related to or for the benefit of children or senior adults.

The executive director is hired by the board.

As of 2020, the Board of Directors is composed of the following:

- Bruce Benjamin, Chair appointed by Oklahoma Speaker of the House
- Michelle Stephens, Vice Chair, appointed by the Governor of Oklahoma
- Marshall Snipes – appointed by the Attorney General of Oklahoma (Congressional District 5)
- Curtis Knoles, MD – appointed by the Oklahoma State Auditor and Inspector (Congressional District 5)
- Casey Killblane – appointed by the Oklahoma Superintendent of Public Instruction (Congressional District 4)
- Ken Rowe – appointed by the President Pro Tempore of the Oklahoma Senate (Congressional District 4)
- Jack Allen, Jr., appointed by the State Treasurer
