= Robert Butkin =

American politician

State Treasurer of Oklahoma
- In office 1995–2005
- Governor: Frank Keating; Brad Henry
- Preceded by: Claudette Henry
- Succeeded by: Scott Meacham

Personal details
- Party: Democrat
- Education: Yale University; University of Pennsylvania Law School

Robert A. Butkin is an American law professor, academic administrator and politician who served as State Treasurer of Oklahoma from 1995 to 2005. Butkin subsequently served as dean of the University of Tulsa College of Law from 2005 until 2007.

== Education ==
Butkin received a Bachelor of Arts degree from Yale College in Connecticut, graduating magna cum laude in 1975 with distinction in history. He received his Juris Doctor from the University of Pennsylvania Law School in Philadelphia in 1978. He was one of 15 Americans named a Henry Luce Scholar in 1978 and served as visiting fellow at the University of the Philippines Law Center in Quezon City.

== Career ==
Butkin was a professor at the University of Tulsa College of Law. Butkin drafted legislation that created Oklahoma's College Savings Plan, and co-chairing the effort to pass two state constitutional amendments that now allow public Oklahoma universities to engage in technology-transfer and commercial development of their own ideas. He also co-chaired the successful effort that created a permanent constitutional trust fund for tobacco-settlement monies. Dean Butkin chaired Governor-elect Brad Henry's transition team, recruiting a bi-partisan group of business, civic and political leaders who assisted the governor in identifying key issues. He has served in various organizations including holding the presidency of the Southern State Treasurers Association. He chaired the Banking, Collateral and Cash Management Committee for the National Association of State Treasurers.

Butkin also held the position of assistant attorney general for the state of Oklahoma and was an associate attorney with the Washington, D.C. law firm of Hogan and Hartson.

== Personal life ==
Butkin has three daughters, Olivia, Julia, and Claire.

== Sources ==
- University of Tulsa College of Law Faculty Pages
- TU Announces New Law Dean

Political offices
Preceded by Claudette Henry (R)	Oklahoma State Treasurer; January 11, 1995 - June 1, 2005	Succeeded by Scott Meacham (D)
Party political offices
Preceded by Ellis Edwards	Democratic nominee for Oklahoma State Treasurer; 1994, 1998, 2002	Succeeded by Scott Meacham
Academic offices
Preceded by Martin H. Belsky	Dean of the University of Tulsa College of Law; June 1, 2005 - June 30, 2007	Succeeded by Janet K. Levit
