= Oklahoma Public Employees Retirement System =

- Great Seal of Oklahoma

Agency overview
- Formed: 1964
- Headquarters: 5801 Broadway Extension, Suite 200 Oklahoma City
- Annual budget: $400 million in retirement payments each year
- Ministers responsible: Preston Doerflinger, Secretary of Finance and Revenue; Preston Doerflinger
- Agency executive: Joseph A. Fox, Executive Director
- Website: www.opers.ok.gov

The Oklahoma Public Employees Retirement System (OPERS) is an agency of the government of Oklahoma that manages the public pension system for majority of Oklahoma state employees. 74 Okla.Statutes §§901 et seq. The System provides pension benefits such as normal retirement, disability retirement, surviving spouse benefits and a death benefit.

The System receives its funding from employer and member contributions, and returns on investments. OPERS is the second largest state-sponsored pension system in Oklahoma with the participation of most state officers and employees, as well as a large number of county officers and employees. The OPERS portfolio contains approximately 6.5 billion dollars in assets.

== About OPERS ==
The Oklahoma Public Employees Retirement System was created in 1964 and administers retirement plans for several different types of government employees, including state and local government employees, state and county elected officials and hazardous duty employees. The plan serves approximately 30,000 benefit recipients, 50,000 active members and 300 participating employers.

== Defined Benefit Plan ==
OPERS is a defined benefit retirement plan qualified under Section 401(a) of the Internal Revenue Code. The plan provides a lifetime retirement benefit when members meet age and service eligibility requirements. Members participate in OPERS by contributing a portion of their salary each pay period. Participating employers also contribute on behalf of their participating employees. The paid contributions are invested by OPERS, under the direction of the Board of Trustees, to provide benefits to present and future members of the system. The amount of contributions does not determine the amount of the benefit OPERS promises. Rather, OPERS retirement benefits are based on a formula: YEARS OF SERVICE x FINAL AVERAGE SALARY x COMPUTATION FACTOR OF 0.02 (or 2%)

== Defined Contribution Plans (SoonerSave) ==
OPERS members who are state employees are also eligible to participate in two defined contribution plans administered by OPERS and collectively known as SoonerSave – the Oklahoma State Employees Deferred Compensation Plan (DCP) and the Oklahoma State Employees Deferred Savings Incentive Plan (SIP). Participation in these plans is voluntary.

The DCP is an Internal Revenue Code Section 457(b) plan and allows eligible state employees to supplement retirement benefits by investing pre-tax dollars through voluntary salary deferral. Employee contributions are deposited in the DCP and federal and state taxes will remain deferred until contributions are withdrawn.

The SIP is qualified under Section 401(a) of the Internal Revenue Code and supplements employees’ retirement benefits by contributing to a plan on their behalf. Currently, the state of Oklahoma contributes the equivalent of $25 a month to the SIP plan if the state employee is contributing at least $25 a month to the DCP plan. The employee selects where the money in both plans is invested among available investment options.

== Investment Gains After Losses in 2008 and 2009 ==
After the stock market declines in 2008 and 2009, the OPERS portfolio bounced back dramatically. The portfolio returned 13.81% in Fiscal Year 2010 and 21.3% in FY 2011. See the OPERS website for the latest information regarding portfolio investments.

== Board of trustees ==
The Board of Trustees are Chairman DeWayne McAnally, Vice Chairwoman Lucinda Meltabarger, and members Lisa Blodgett, Jari Askins, Jill Geiger, James R. "Rusty" Hale, Steven Kaestner, Thomas E. Kemp, Jr., Don Kilpatrick, Brian Maddy and Frank Stone. The Oklahoma State Pension Commission is responsible for overseeing financial status and conditions of OPERS.
