= Scott Meacham =

American politician

17th State Treasurer of Oklahoma
- In office June 1, 2005 – January 10, 2011
- Governor: Brad Henry
- Preceded by: Robert Butkin
- Succeeded by: Ken A. Miller

Oklahoma Secretary of Finance and Revenue
- In office 2003–2011
- Governor: Brad Henry
- Preceded by: Tom Daxon
- Succeeded by: Preston Doerflinger

Oklahoma Director of State Finance
- In office 2003 – June 1, 2005
- Governor: Brad Henry
- Preceded by: Tom Daxon
- Succeeded by: Claudia San Pedro

Personal details
- Born: 1963 (age 62–63) Chickasha, Oklahoma
- Party: Democratic
- Spouse: Susan
- Children: 4

Scott Meacham (born 1963) served as the 17th State Treasurer of Oklahoma from June, 2005 to January, 2011, having been appointed to that post by then-Governor Brad Henry following the resignation of then-State Treasurer Robert Butkin. Meacham was subsequently elected to a full four-year term as state treasurer defeating the Republican nominee, Howard Barnett Jr., in the November 2006 general election. He declined to seek reelection as state treasurer in 2010, and joined the Oklahoma City law firm of Crowe & Dunlevy upon completion of his term as state treasurer. In December, 2012, he was appointed as president and CEO of i2e, an Oklahoma City-based non-profit corporation which provides services to startup companies throughout the state.

== Early life and education ==
A fifth generation Oklahoman, Meacham was born and grew up in Chickasha, Oklahoma. Following graduation from high school, he attended the University of Oklahoma, earning a B.A. in finance, an M.B.A., and a law degree.

Prior to joining the administration of Governor Brad Henry, Meacham practiced law with the Clinton, Oklahoma-based firm of Meacham and Meacham, specializing in commercial law, probate law, and estate planning. In 1989, he became CEO of First National Bank and Trust in Elk City, Oklahoma, serving in that capacity until 2003.

== Henry Administration ==
In 2003, Governor Brad Henry appointed Meacham to serve concurrently as Oklahoma Secretary of Finance and Revenue and as director of the Oklahoma Office of State Finance. In 2005, following the resignation of Robert Butkin to become Dean of the University of Tulsa College of Law, Governor Henry appointed Meacham as State Treasurer of Oklahoma. Following his appointment as state treasurer, he resigned as state finance director, but retained his post as Secretary of Finance and Revenue. Meacham was elected to his first full four-year term as state treasurer defeating the Republican nominee, Howard Barnett Jr., in the November 2006 general elections. In October 2009, Meacham announced that he would not seek another term as state treasurer or run for any other state-level office in the 2010 election.

== Personal life ==
Meacham, his wife, Susan, and their four children, Trevor, Evan, Kady and Lucas, make their home in Edmond, Oklahoma. They attend Crossings Community Church in Oklahoma City.

Political offices
Preceded by Tom Daxon	Oklahoma Secretary of Finance and Revenue; Under Governor Brad Henry; 2003 – 2011	Succeeded by Preston Doerflinger
Preceded by Tom Daxon	Oklahoma Director of State Finance; Under Governor Brad Henry; 2003 – June 1, 2005	Succeeded by Claudia San Pedro
Preceded by Robert Butkin	Oklahoma State Treasurer; June 1, 2005 – 2011	Succeeded by Ken A. Miller
Party political offices
Preceded by Robert Butkin	Democratic nominee for Oklahoma State Treasurer; 2006	Succeeded by Stephen Covert
