= Oklahoma Indigent Defense System =

Oklahoma Indigent Defense System Board
- Great Seal of Oklahoma

Agency overview
- Formed: July 1, 1991
- Headquarters: PO Box 926; Norman, Oklahoma
- Employees: 135 unclassified
- Annual budget: $8.7 million
- Ministers responsible: Kevin Ward, Secretary of Safety and Security; Rod Wiemer, Chairman of the Board
- Agency executive: W. Craig Sutter, Executive Director; Deputy Executive Director
- Parent agency: Indigent Defense System Board
- Website: www.ok.gov/OIDS/

The Oklahoma Indigent Defense System is the system in Oklahoma that provides trial, appellate, and post-conviction criminal defense services to persons judicially determined to be entitled to legal counsel at expense to the state. The Oklahoma Indigent Defense System was created by and is responsible for implementing the Oklahoma Indigent Defense Act.

Indigent Defense Act of Oklahoma http://www.ok.gov/OIDS/documents/Indigent%20Defense%20Act.pdf

== Board of directors ==
The system is governed by the Oklahoma Indigent Defense System Board. The Board is composed of five members appointed by the Governor of Oklahoma for staggered five-year terms with the advice and consent of the Oklahoma Senate. At least three members of the Board be licensed attorneys with criminal defense experience. The Governor designates one member as the Chair of the Board. No congressional district or county may be represented by more than one member on the Board.

=== Current Board members ===
- Rod Wiemer - Chair
  - Term ending: July 1, 2013
- Don G. Pope
  - term ending: July 1, 2012
- Dennis N. Shook
  - Term ending: July 1, 2011
- Jake Jones, III - Vice Chair
  - Term ending: July 1, 2010
- Randolph S. Meacham
  - Term ending: June 30, 2014

== Organization ==
- Board of Directors
  - Executive Director
    - General Operations Program
      - Executive Division
    - Trial Program
      - Non-Capital Trial Division
      - Capital Trial Division (Norman)
      - Capital Trial Division (Tulsa)
    - Appellate Program
      - General Appeals Division
      - Capital Direct Appeals Division
      - Capital Post-Conviction Division
