= Oklahoma Firefighters Pension and Retirement System =

- Great Seal of Oklahoma

Agency overview
- Formed: 1980
- Preceding agency: Fireman’s Pension Benefit Program
- Headquarters: 4545 N Lincoln Boulevard; Oklahoma City, Oklahoma
- Employees: 11 unclassified
- Annual budget: $260 million
- Ministers responsible: Scott Meacham, Secretary of Finance and Revenue; Les Foughty, Chair of the Board
- Agency executive: Robert Jones, Executive Director
- Parent agency: Board of Trustees
- Website: Oklahoma Firefighters Pension and Retirement System

The Oklahoma Firefighters Pension and Retirement System (OFPRS) is an agency of the government of Oklahoma that manages the public pension system for firefighters in Oklahoma. The System provides pension benefits such as normal retirement, disability retirement, surviving spouse benefits and a death benefit.

The System receives its funding from employer and member contributions, a portion of the state insurance premium tax and returns on investments. The System is overseen by a 13-member Board of Trustees, which is responsible for governing the System and appointing the Executive Director to run the System.

The System was created in 1980 during the term of Governor of Oklahoma George Nigh.

== History ==
Governor of Oklahoma Charles N. Haskell signed into law the first fireman’s pension benefit law May 14, 1908. The new law contained a 1 percent tax on insurance premiums to fund the pension benefits for both paid and volunteer firefighters. Oklahoma cities and towns administered the program until the Oklahoma Legislature created the current System in 1980.

== Leadership ==
The System is overseen by the Secretary of Finance and Revenue. Under Governor of Oklahoma Brad Henry, Scott Meacham is currently serving as Secretary.

== Board of trustees ==
The System is governed by a thirteen-member Board of Trustees. The Board members are appointed as follows:

- Oklahoma State Firefighters Association Executive Board (5 members)
- President of the Professional Firefighters of Oklahoma or a designee (1 member)
- President of the Oklahoma Retired Firefighters Association or a designee (1 member)
- Speaker of the House of Representatives Appointee (1 member)
- President Pro Tempore of the Senate Appointee (1 member)
- Oklahoma Municipal League Appointees (2 members)
- State Insurance Commissioner or a designee (1 member)
- Director of the Office of State Finance or a designee (1 member)
