= Tax equalization =

Process used by international companies to adjust employee pay to account for taxation

Tax equalization is a policy applied by some international companies under which employees who are hired in one country and later accept a (temporary) assignment in another country do not have their total after-tax ("take-home") compensation changed depending on the tax regimes of the country they move to. If the employee is assigned to a country with lower taxes, the company takes the savings. On the other hand, if they move to a country with higher taxation, the company pays the excess. Either way, under a tax equalization policy, the after-tax compensation received by the employee is same. The purpose of such policies is to help companies fulfill international staffing needs without employees being incentivized or disincentivized from accepting particular assignments due to tax differences between countries.

A similar policy which only benefits the employee (reducing taxes if working abroad results in higher taxes, but not raising them if working abroad results in lower taxes), then it is referred to as a tax protection policy.

== Theory ==
The idea is that an individual's income stays the same. There are some steps on how to determine the tax:

Calculate the amount of money paid on taxes in an individual's home country. This sum of money is the hypothetical tax liability.

Reduce the pay of the individual by his/her tax liability.

Add any allowance that is necessary to be paid while he/she is abroad as a result of an assignment. This is his/her net assignment pay.

== Practice ==
In practice, it is usually about agreement of both sides. Both parties should know on which basis is the tax calculated. After this is calculated, the amount is deducted from an individual's net pay on a regular basis throughout his/her assignment abroad. It is common, that the company deducts a hypothetical liability at the beginning of the year and then undertakes tax reconciliation at the end of the year.
