= Ken A. Miller =

American politician (born 1966)

Ken Miller
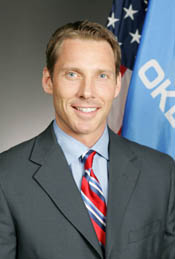

State Treasurer of Oklahoma
- In office January 10, 2011 – January 2, 2019
- Governor: Mary Fallin
- Preceded by: Scott Meacham
- Succeeded by: Randy McDaniel

Member of the Oklahoma House of Representatives from the 81st district
- In office November 2004 – November 2010
- Preceded by: Ray Vaughn
- Succeeded by: Randy Grau

Personal details
- Born: Kenneth Adams Miller; October 27, 1966 (age 60) Memphis, Tennessee, U.S.
- Party: Republican
- Education: Lipscomb University (BS); Pepperdine University (MBA); University of Oklahoma (PhD)

Kenneth A. Miller (born October 27, 1966) is an American educator and Republican politician from Oklahoma. Miller was the 18th Oklahoma State Treasurer, having won that position in the 2010 state election and served the maximum two four-year terms allowed under state term limits.

Miller formerly served as a state representative for District 81 in the Oklahoma House of Representatives which included portions of Edmond, Oklahoma. Miller was the chair of the House's Appropriations and Budget Committee, which had legislative oversight of fiscal policy and budget.

== Early life ==
Ken Miller grew up in Memphis, Tennessee and graduated from Harding Academy. He earned his Bachelor of Science degree from Lipscomb University in 1989, his Master of Business Administration from Pepperdine University in 1993, and a doctoral degree from the University of Oklahoma. He began his professional career in banking at First American National Bank before joining MediFax-EDS as the financial operations manager. He joined Oklahoma Christian University as a professor of Economics in 1998.

== Keating Administration ==
In 1998, Republican incumbent Frank Keating was elected to his second term as Governor of Oklahoma. During that term, Governor Keating appointed Miller as the chairman of the Oklahoma Board on Legislative Compensation. The board is responsible for establishing the salary received by each member of the legislature. While chairman, he worked to enforce a freeze on legislative salaries and rejected any increase in compensation during his four years leading the Board.

== State representative ==
In 2004, Miller was elected as a Republican to the Oklahoma House of Representatives, representing the 81st House District, during the 2004 elections that resulted in Republican control of the House of Representatives for the first time since 1920. Miller was reelected in 2006 and 2008.

Miller's financial background led his Republican colleagues to elect him as vice-chair of the House Appropriations and Budget Committee in 2006. One year later he was elevated to the position of chair, where he served for three years.

== State treasurer ==
Ken Miller won the Republican nomination for state treasurer by defeating former State Sen. Owen Laughlin, earning 63% of the primary votes.

In the general election, Ken Miller gained the endorsement of outgoing Democratic State Treasurer Scott Meacham (who chose not to seek re-election), and thus handily defeated his Democratic opponent Stephen Covert by 2–1 margin, with Miller winning almost 67% of the vote and winning each of Oklahoma's 77 counties.

Miller assumed office as state treasurer on January 10, 2011. He resigned effective January 2, 2019.

== Electoral history ==
Oklahoma House of Representatives 81st District Republican Primary Election, 2004
Party	Candidate	Votes	%
Republican	Ken Miller	2,253	42.69
Republican	Leonard Scott	1,825	34.58
Republican	Clark Curry	1,199	22.72

Oklahoma House of Representatives 81st District Republican Primary Runoff Election, 2004
Party	Candidate	Votes	%
Republican	Ken Miller	2,131	57.07
Republican	Leonard Scott	1,603	42.93

Oklahoma House of Representatives 81st District Election, 2004
Party	Candidate	Votes	%
Republican	Ken Miller	12,708	74.09
Democratic	Bryan Carlile	4,444	25.91

Oklahoma House of Representatives 81st District Election, 2006
Party	Candidate	Votes	%
Republican	Ken Miller	n/a	100.00

Oklahoma House of Representatives 81st District Election, 2008
Party	Candidate	Votes	%
Republican	Ken Miller	n/a	100.00

Oklahoma Treasurer Republican Primary Election, 2010
Party	Candidate	Votes	%
Republican	Ken Miller	145,415	63.04
Republican	Owen Laughlin	85,240	36.96

Oklahoma Treasurer Election, 2010
Party	Candidate	Votes	%
Republican	Ken Miller	675,515	66.57
Democratic	Stephen Covert	339,272	33.43

Oklahoma Treasurer Election, 2014
Party	Candidate	Votes	%
Republican	Ken Miller (inc.)	n/a	100.00

Oklahoma House of Representatives
Preceded by Ray Vaughn	Member of the Oklahoma House of Representatives from the 81st district 2004–2010	Succeeded by Randy Grau
Party political offices
Preceded by Howard Barnett	Republican nominee for Treasurer of Oklahoma; 2010	Succeeded by Randy McDaniel
Political offices
Preceded by Scott Meacham	Treasurer of Oklahoma; 2011–2019	Succeeded by Randy McDaniel
