= Randy McDaniel =

American politician

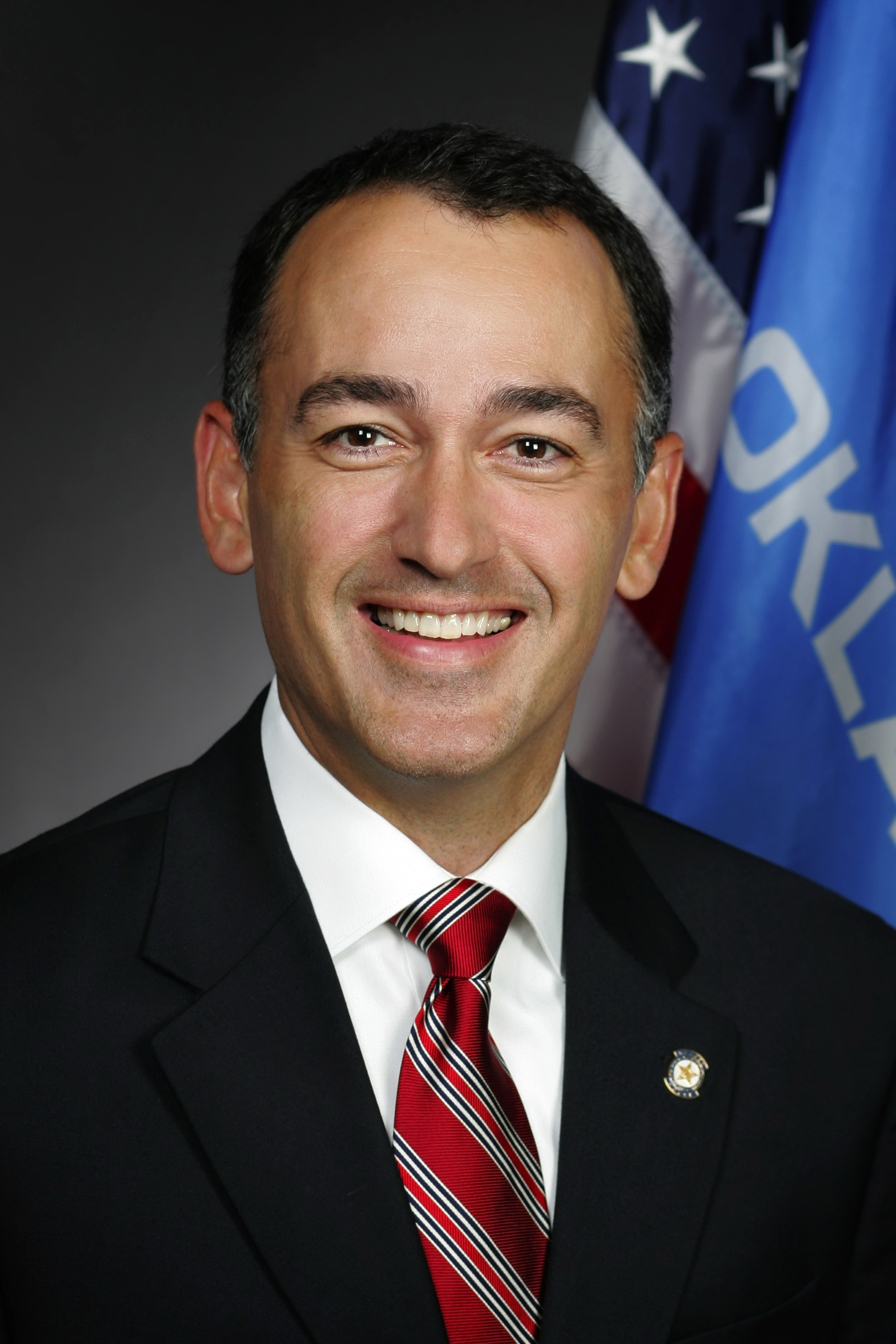

19th Treasurer of Oklahoma
- In office January 2, 2019 – January 9, 2023
- Governor: Mary Fallin; Kevin Stitt
- Preceded by: Ken A. Miller
- Succeeded by: Todd Russ

Member of the Oklahoma House of Representatives from the 83rd district
- In office November 2006 – November 2018
- Preceded by: Fred Morgan
- Succeeded by: Chelsey Branham

Personal details
- Born: August 8, 1967 (age 58) Oklahoma City, Oklahoma
- Party: Republican
- Education: University of Oklahoma (BS); University of Cambridge (MPhil)

Randy McDaniel (born August 8, 1967) is an American politician who served as the Oklahoma State Treasurer from 2019 to 2023. A Republican, he was a member of the Oklahoma House of Representatives, for the 83rd district, from 2007 through 2019.

== Career ==
McDaniel graduated from Edmond Memorial High School in Edmond, Oklahoma, in 1986. He graduated from the University of Oklahoma with a bachelor's degree in economics and from the University of Cambridge with a master's degree in land economy. He worked in banking and as a financial advisor. In 2006, McDaniel was elected to the Oklahoma House of Representatives for the 83rd district. He served in the Oklahoma House for six terms. In the 2018 elections, McDaniel ran for Oklahoma State Treasurer. He won the election over Democrat Charles de Coune.

Ken Miller resigned as Treasurer effective January 1, 2019, and Mary Fallin appointed McDaniel, swearing him in that day. McDaniel announced that he would not run for reelection in 2022.

Party political offices
Preceded by Ken A. Miller	Republican nominee for Oklahoma State Treasurer; 2018	Succeeded by Todd Russ
Political offices
Preceded by Ken A. Miller	Treasurer of Oklahoma; 2019–2023	Succeeded by Todd Russ
