= Preston Doerflinger =

American businessman and politician

Oklahoma Secretary of Finance and Revenue
- In office January 19, 2011 – February 13, 2018
- Governor: Mary Fallin
- Preceded by: Scott Meacham

Director of the Oklahoma Office of State Finance
- In office January 19, 2011 – February 13, 2018
- Governor: Mary Fallin
- Preceded by: Michael Clingman

City Auditor of Tulsa, Oklahoma
- In office 2009 – January 19, 2011

Personal details
- Education: Southern Nazarene University
- Occupation: Businessman

Preston Doerflinger (born 1973) is an American businessman and politician who was the Oklahoma Secretary of Finance and Revenue. Doerflinger was appointed by then Governor of Oklahoma Mary Fallin on January 19, 2011. Prior to his appointment, Doerflinger served as the city auditor for Tulsa, Oklahoma from 2009 until this appointment as secretary. Shortly thereafter he was also named the Director of the newly created Office of Management and Enterprise Systems. In his role as Secretary of Finance he was the Governor's lead budget executive and negotiator. He was appointed by the governor as the Interim Commissioner of Health in October, 2017 while maintaining his roles as Cabinet Secretary and Director of the Office of Management and Enterprise Systems. He resigned from all of his roles in Oklahoma State government in February 2018.

== Biography ==
Doerflinger was raised in Oologah, Oklahoma. He earned a bachelor's degree in organizational leadership from Southern Nazarene University. Doerflinger was the Republican nominee for City Auditor for Tulsa, Oklahoma. He was elected in 2009 to a two-year term. As city auditor, he oversaw the city's Management Review Office and was tasked with the implementation of government service improvements.

On January 19, 2011, Governor of Oklahoma Mary Fallin announced that she had selected Doerflinger to serve as her Oklahoma Secretary of Finance and Revenue. The Governor also announced that she would appointment him to a concurrent term as the Director of the Oklahoma Office of State Finance, later consolidated with several state agencies to create the Office of Management and Enterprise Services. As Secretary, Doerflinger was responsible for preparing and implementing the Governor's budget as well as overseeing the Governor's fiscal policies. Doerflinger was also the Governor's lead budget negotiator.

In October 2017, Doerflinger was named the Interim Commissioner of Health by Governor Mary Fallin after the previous Commissioner resigned amid allegations of financial and operational mismanagement.

On February 13, 2018, Doerflinger resigned from state government after an article about an incident six years prior was published by Dylan Goforth with The Frontier. The article was in reference to 2012 Tulsa Police call logs, which included a 911 call relating to domestic violence. The call log and 911 call were long known to the Governor and most in state government.

== Personal life ==
Doerflinger has one son with his wife Jill Doerflinger they were married in 2001 until 2017.

Political offices
Preceded by Scott Meacham	Oklahoma Secretary of Finance and Revenue; Under Governor Mary Fallin; January 19, 2011 – February 13, 2018	Incumbent
Preceded by Michael Clingman	Director of the Oklahoma Office of State Finance; Under Governor Mary Fallin; January 19, 2011 – February 13, 2018	Incumbent
