= Oklahoma State Treasurer =

Elected statewide office

State Treasurer of the State of Oklahoma
- Great Seal of the State of Oklahoma

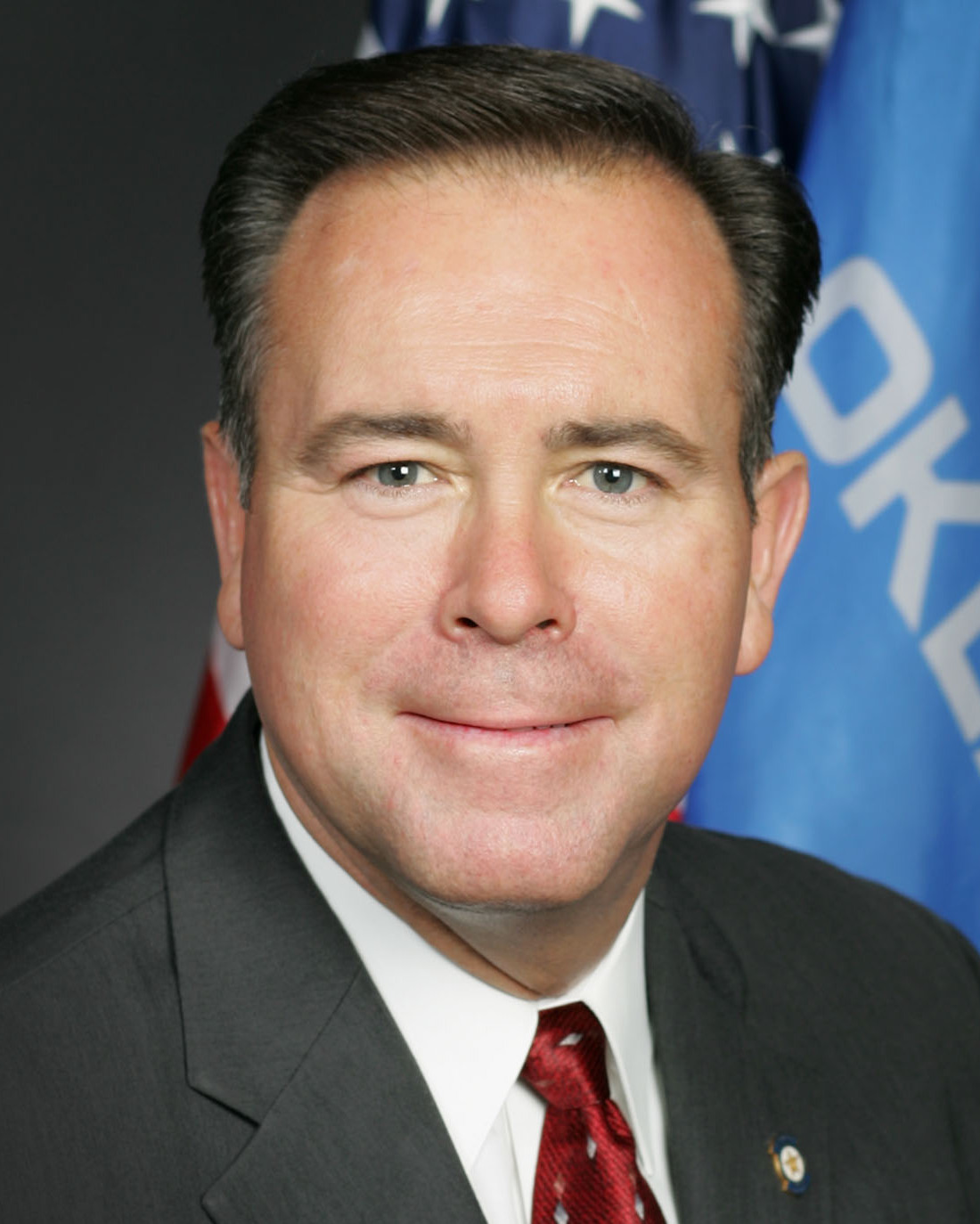
- Incumbent; Todd Russ since January 9, 2023
- Term length: Four years, renewable once (maximum lifetime)
- Formation: November 16, 1907
- Succession: Sixth
- Website: State Treasurer's Website

The State Treasurer of Oklahoma is the chief custodian of Oklahoma's cash deposits, monies from bond sales, and other securities and collateral and directs the investments of those assets. The treasurer provides for the safe and efficient operation of state government through effective banking, investment, and cash management. The state treasurer has the powers of a typical chief financial officer for a corporation.

The State Treasurer of Oklahoma is Todd Russ, who was elected as State Treasurer in the 2022 election.

== Office of Treasurer ==
=== Constitutional requirements ===
As with all offices established by the Oklahoma Constitution in Article VI, any person running for the office of State Treasurer of Oklahoma must be citizen of the State of Oklahoma, at least thirty-one years of age and a resident of the United States for ten years.

=== Election ===
Elections for the state treasurer are held on a four-year concurrent basis with the election of the governor. After all votes are collected, the Legislature of Oklahoma shall convene in the hall of the House of Representatives and the Speaker of the House of Representatives announce the results of the elections in the presence of a majority of each branch of the Legislature. The persons having the highest number of votes for the office of the state treasurer shall be declared duly elected. However, in case two or more shall have an equal and the highest number of votes for the office of state treasurer, the Legislature shall, by joint ballot, choose one of the said persons having an equal and the highest number of votes for the office of state treasurer.

=== Term(s) of office ===
The state treasurer's four-year term begins on the first Monday in January falling the general election and runs concurrently with that term of the Governor of Oklahoma. The Constitution of Oklahoma places no limit to the number of terms a candidate may serve in succession or in total.

=== Oath of office ===
"I, ........., do solemnly swear (or affirm) that I will support, obey, and defend the Constitution of the United States, and the Constitution of the State of Oklahoma, and that I will not, knowingly, receive, directly or indirectly, any money or other valuable thing, for the performance or nonperformance of any act or duty pertaining to my office, other than the compensation allowed by law; I further swear (or affirm) that I will faithfully discharge my duties as State Treasurer of the State of Oklahoma to the best of my ability."

=== Powers and duties ===
The state treasurer has the following specific statutory and constitutional responsibilities:

- Receiving, depositing, and disbursing all state funds
- Investing temporary surplus funds
- Investing specific funds for other state agencies where authorized
- Requiring banks to furnish collateral sufficient to secure deposits of state and other public funds
- Paying of interest on the state's bonded debt and the redeeming of the debt at maturity
- Maintaining a safekeeping operation for securities owned by various state agencies, and those securities pledged as collateral to other state agencies
- Processing and distributing all State checks (known as warrants)
- Administering the Business Link and Agricultural Link Programs
- Administering the Unclaimed Property Program

Approximately $10 billion is deposited each year at the state treasurer's office into the Oklahoma State Treasury. This includes state tax revenues, such as income tax and gross production tax receipts; federal funds, such as matching funds for highway construction; and other tax revenues, such as the motor fuel tax, which are collected by the state but then apportioned to the counties and cities.

The state treasurer has no power to impose taxes, set tax rates or collect taxes; only to make sure all public funds are properly accounted for once it has been collected or distributed by other executive branch entities. Also, the state treasurer does not formulate the state's annual budget nor does the office have any authority to impound funds allocated by the Oklahoma State Legislature.

To earn additional revenue for Oklahoma, the state treasurer invests money which is not immediately needed to fund government operations. The office has an average of $5 billion of taxpayers’ money in its investment portfolio. The Treasurer's investments are strictly governed by Oklahoma statutes and the Treasurer's investment policy.

Many of the treasurer's duties require the advice of both the Governor of Oklahoma and the Attorney General of Oklahoma, such as the ability to determine the use of the State's surplus funds. Constitutionally the state treasurer presides over or is a member of four state boards and commissions.

Commission	Position
Oklahoma College Savings Plan Board of Trustees	Chairman
Board of Investors of the Oklahoma Tobacco Settlement Endowment Trust	Chairman
State Industrial Finance Authority	Non-Voting Member
State Board of Equalization	Member

== Office of the State Treasurer ==
Office of the State Treasurer

Agency overview
- Formed: 1907
- Preceding agency: Office of the Territorial Treasurer
- Headquarters: Oklahoma State Capitol Oklahoma City, Oklahoma
- Employees: 49 (FY2013)
- Annual budget: $8.4 million (FY2013)
- Minister responsible: Randy McDaniel, State Treasurer
- Agency executive: Regina Burcham, Chief of Staff
- Website: Office of the State Treasurer

The Office of the State Treasurer is the state agency which supports the state treasurer. The office provides banking and investment services for state agencies, reuniting individuals and businesses with their unclaimed property, and promoting economic development Statewide. The agency consists of the treasurer's staff. Staffers work in the treasurer's offices in the Oklahoma State Capitol in Oklahoma City.

As of 2013, the agency has an annual budget of approximately $8.4 million. The budget provides funding for approximately 49 full-time employees.

=== Organization ===
- State treasurer
  - Chief deputy treasurer
    - Human resources
    - Investment portfolio accounting and reporting
    - Banking services
      - Banking operations
      - Treasury services
    - Finance and budget
    - Unclaimed property
  - Deputy treasurer for policy/chief of staff
  - Deputy treasurer for communications and program administration
  - Chief investment officer
  - Compliance officer/internal auditor

== Relationship with the governor ==
The state treasurer is an independently elected officer with both constitutional and statutory authority. As such, the governor has no direct authority over the state treasurer. However, Oklahoma's history of electing governors and treasurers of the same party has often led to positive working relationships between the two offices.

The state treasurer is the state's elected chief fiscal officer and is directly accountable to the voters. In contrast, the governor's secretary of finance reports directly to the governor. Only once in recent history has a state treasurer also served as the governor's budget advisor; Governor Brad Henry appointed Miller's predecessor Scott Meacham as his secretary of finance and revenue, giving Meacham supervision over all finance agencies of the State government.

When the governor and state treasurer are of different parties, the state treasurer's role in state government is often minimal.

The governor, acting through the Oklahoma Office of Management and Enterprise Services (whose director serves at the pleasure of the governor), is responsible for submitting an annual budget request to the legislature, which is charged with crafting the funding decisions. The governor does have veto power to influence the end result of the budget process. Once the budget is enacted, the state treasurer has no power to alter the budget or to impound funds, but the success of the treasurer's investments influence the funds available for allocation.

== Office-holders ==
The following is a list of those individuals who have served as state treasurer for Oklahoma:

Image	Name	Party	Term start	Term end
	James Menefee	Democratic	November 16, 1907	January 9, 1911
	Robert Dunlop	Democratic	January 9, 1911	January 11, 1915
	William Lee Alexander	Democratic	January 11, 1915	January 13, 1919
	A. N. Leecraft	Democratic	January 13, 1919	January 8, 1923
	A. S. J. Shaw	Democratic	January 13, 1923	January 10, 1927
	Richard A. Sneed	Democratic	January 10, 1927	January 12, 1931
	Ray Weems	Democratic	January 12, 1931	January 15, 1935
	Hugh L. Harrell	Democratic	January 15, 1935	1935
	Hubert L. Bolen	Democratic	1935	January 9, 1939
	Carl B. Sebring	Democratic	January 9, 1939	January 11, 1943
	A. S. J. Shaw	Democratic	January 11, 1943	January 13, 1947
	John D. Conner	Democratic	January 13, 1947	January 8, 1951
	A. S. J. Shaw	Democratic	January 8, 1951	January 10, 1955
	John D. Conner	Democratic	January 10, 1955	January 12, 1959
	William A. Burkhart	Democratic	January 12, 1959	January 14, 1963
	Cowboy Pink Williams	Democratic	January 14, 1963	January 9, 1967
	Leo Winters	Democratic	January 9, 1967	January 12, 1987
	Ellis Edwards	Democratic	January 12, 1987	January 14, 1991
	Claudette Henry	Republican	January 14, 1991	January 9, 1995
	Robert Butkin	Democratic	January 9, 1995	June 1, 2005
	Scott Meacham	Democratic	June 1, 2005	January 10, 2011
	Ken Miller	Republican	January 10, 2011	January 1, 2019
	Randy McDaniel	Republican	January 1, 2019	January 9, 2023
	Todd Russ	Republican	January 9, 2023	present

== See also ==
- Official State Treasurer of Oklahoma home page
