= Oklahoma Tax Commission =

Agency overview
- Formed: 1931
- Headquarters: 300 N Broadway Avenue; Oklahoma City, Oklahoma 73102
- Employees: 695.6
- Annual budget: $106,712,423
- Agency executives: Zack Taylor, Chairman; Shelly Paulk, Vice Chairman; Daniel J. LaFortune, Secretary-Member; Doug Linehan, Executive Director
- Website: www.ok.gov/tax/

The Oklahoma Tax Commission (OTC) is the Oklahoma state government agency that collects taxes and enforces the taxation and revenue laws of the state. The commission is composed of three members appointed by the Governor of Oklahoma and confirmed by the Oklahoma Senate. The commissioners are charged with oversight of the agency but appoint an executive director to serve as the chief administrative officer of the commission and to oversee the general practices of the commission.

The Tax Commission was created in 1931 during the term of Governor of Oklahoma William H. Murray.

== Leadership ==
The current members of the commission are:

- Zack Taylor - chairman
- Shelly Paulk - vice chairman
- Daniel J. LaFortune - secretary-member

Executive director - Doug Linehan

Under Governor Kevin Stitt, the commission is under the supervision of Oklahoma Secretary of Finance, Administration and Information Technology.

== Jurisdiction ==
The commission has responsibility for supervising the administration and enforcement of state tax laws and the collection of a majority of all state-levied taxes and fees. The commission directs the collection and distribution of the tax and license sources under its administration and, by statute, is responsible for distributing such tax revenues to the various state funds. In addition, the commission allocates certain state-collected taxes earmarked to counties, school districts and cities directly to local governments.

On a contractual basis with individual cities and counties, the commission is involved with the administration, collection and distribution of city and county sales taxes and city use taxes.

== Organization ==
The commission is composed of thirteen divisions organized into three administrations: Customer Service, Revenue Administration and Support Services.

- Tax Commission
  - Executive Director
    - Deputy Director
      - Account Maintenance Division - responsible for monitoring tax receivables and monitoring taxpayer payment plans, processing tax refunds to taxpayers, conducting informal desk audits of tax returns
      - Information Technology Division - responsible for providing technical support to other divisions and the management and implementation of technologies for agency
      - Central Processing Division - responsible for processing, sorting, imaging, and data entry of all income mail and payments as well as central clearing house of all outgoing mail
      - Taxpayer Assistance Division - responsible for responding to inquiries from taxpayers, processing taxpayer applications, and issuing tax licenses and permits
      - Communications Division - responsible for providing information to the general public, tracking the use of filing methods, and preparing and distributing tax forms and publications
    - Management Services Division - responsible for providing business continuity functions, internal agency financials, purchasing processes, and apportionment of tax revenue to appropriate category once collected
    - Motor Vehicle Division - responsible for interactions with the local tag agents, collecting taxes and fees related to motor vehicle, and processing motor vehicle title, insurance, and lien application
    - Compliance Division - responsible for auditing taxpayers to determine the existence of delinquent taxes and for ensuring delinquent taxes found through audits are paid through collection efforts
    - Human Resources Division - responsible for managing internal hiring process and monitoring employee training
    - Ad Valorem Division - responsible for evaluating public service companies as well as prescribing forms, rules, and regulations to accomplish property assessment for county-level property valuations
    - Tax Policy Division - responsible for analyzing all proposed tax-related legislative changes on tax collections and economic impact, providing revenue forecast for state budget development, and developing new legislative proposals and regulatory policies
    - Legal Division - provides internal legal advises by representation in court and in administrative hearings

== Staffing ==
The Tax Commission, with an annual budget of $107 million, is one of the larger employers for the State. For fiscal year 2017, the commission was authorized 1,150 employees but only utilized 695.6 FTE. In fiscal year 2020, the OTC had an FTE count as follows:

Division	Number of Employees
Headquarters	17
Administration	19
Taxpayer Assistance	53
Communications	9
Account Maintenance	69
Ad Valorem	32
Central Process	55
Tax Policy	12
Management Services	30
Human Resources	4
Information Technology	34
Legal	35
Compliance	259
Motor Vehicles	84
Total	712

== See also ==
- Okla. Tax Comm'n v. Citizen Band, Potawatomi Indian Tribe of Okla.
