= Oklahoma Office of Management and Enterprise Services =

- Great Seal of Oklahoma

Agency overview
- Formed: 2012
- Preceding agencies: Office of State Finance; State Budget Office
- Headquarters: 2401 N. Lincoln Blvd. Oklahoma City, Oklahoma
- Employees: 1325 (FY14)
- Annual budget: $340.4 million (FY14)
- Minister responsible: Katie DeMuth
- Agency executive: Katie DeMuth, Interim Director
- Website: Office of Management and Enterprise Services

The Oklahoma Office of Management and Enterprise Services (OMES) is a government agency which manages and supports the basic functioning of the government of Oklahoma. Under the leadership of the Oklahoma Secretary of Agency Accountability, OMES provides financial, property, purchasing, human resources and information technology services to all state agencies, and assists the Governor of Oklahoma on developing the annual state budget. Originally called the Office of State Finance, the agency was renamed to its current name in 2012.

The Office is headed by a director who is appointed by the governor with the approval of the Oklahoma Senate, to serve at the pleasure of the governor. Within the office is the state's chief information officer, who is also appointed by the governor, who oversees the state's information technology systems.

The current OMES director is Katie DeMuth, who was named interim director by Governor Kevin Stitt.

The Office of Management and Enterprise Services was created in 2012 during the term of Governor Mary Fallin.

== Overview ==
=== History ===
The Office of State Finance was created in 1947 by Governor of Oklahoma Robert S. Kerr to replace the State Budget Office.

In April 2010, Governor Brad Henry appointed the Oklahoma's first chief information officer following legislation passed in the last session of 2009 modernizing Oklahoma's state government information technology system. Part of the CIO's responsibilities is to identify synergies possible through the reduction of duplicate systems and centralizing IT infrastructure.

The Office of State Finance was significantly reformed in 2011 when Governor Mary Fallin signed the Government Administrative Process Consolidation and Reorganization Reform Act of 2011. Pursuant to that Act, several agencies were consolidated into OSF, including the Oklahoma Department of Central Services, the Oklahoma Office of Personnel Management, the Oklahoma State Employees Benefits Council, and the Oklahoma State and Education Employees Group Insurance Board. All the powers and duties of those agencies were vested in the director of OSF and the individual agencies became subsidiary divisions of the OSF, which was renamed the Office of Management and Enterprise Services.
