= Oklahoma Secretary of Health and Human Services =

U.S. state government position

- Great Seal of Oklahoma

Agency overview
- Formed: 1986; January 10, 2011
- Preceding agency: Oklahoma Secretary of Health Oklahoma Secretary of Human Services
- Dissolved: February 1, 2003 – January 10, 2011
- Employees: 15,591 (FY11)
- Annual budget: $8 billion (FY11)
- Child agencies: Oklahoma State Department of Health; Oklahoma Department of Mental Health and Substance Abuse Services; Oklahoma Health Care Authority; Oklahoma Department of Human Services; Oklahoma Department of Rehabilitation Services; Oklahoma Office of Juvenile Affairs

The Oklahoma Secretary of Health and Human Services is a member of the Oklahoma Governor's Cabinet. The Secretary is appointed by the Governor, with the consent of the Oklahoma Senate, to serve at the pleasure of the Governor. The Secretary serves as the chief advisor to the Governor on public health and public assistance.

== History ==
The position of Secretary of Health and Human Services was established in 1986 by the Executive Branch Reform Act of 1986. The Act directed to the Secretary to oversee all agencies in the State relating to the public health and assistance programs. The position was dissolved on February 1, 2003, by Governor Brad Henry when he split the post into two separate positions: the Oklahoma Secretary of Health concerned with public health protection and the Oklahoma Secretary of Human Services concerned with providing public assistance programs.

The position was re-established by Governor Mary Fallin on January 27, 2011, when she dissolved the separate positions of Health Secretary and Human Services Secretary.

== Responsibilities ==
The Secretary of Health and Human Services is the chief public health officer of the State. The Secretary oversees vaccinations, disease prevention, mental health services, substance abuse treatment, and emergency health responses. The Secretary also is responsible for regulation of the State health delivery system as well as overseeing the State's Medicaid program. The Secretary has jurisdiction over most public assistance programs offered by the State. Such programs include child care services, senior citizen assistance, child custody services, disability vocational services, and services to the blind and deaf. The Secretary also oversees services to juveniles, both treatment and corrections.

As of fiscal year 2011, the Secretary of Health oversees 15,591 full-time employees and is responsible for an annual budget over $8 billion.

== Agencies overseen ==
The Secretary of Health and Human Services oversees the following State agencies:

Seal	Agency	Employees	Budget (in millions)	Function
	Department of Health	2368	$373	Protects the health of all Oklahomans by providing essential public health services
	Department of Human Services	7300	$2,300	Provides help to individuals and families in need through public assistance programs and managing services for seniors and people with disabilities
	Department of Mental Health and Substance Abuse Services	2192	$311	Provides public health services relating to mental illness and substance abuse.
	Department of Rehabilitation Services	1079	$136	Provides people with physical, mental and visual disabilities with counseling and job training
	Health Care Authority	416	$4,600	Provides health insurance benefits for the state's "SoonerCare" (Oklahoma's Medicaid program) members
	Office of Juvenile Affairs	1056	$127	Responsible for planning and coordinating statewide juvenile justice and delinquency prevention services

- All numbers represented Fiscal Year 2011 levels

== List of secretaries ==
An incomplete list of secretaries:

Secretaries of Health and Human Services (1986–2003)

Name	Took office	Left office	Governor served under
Ken Lackey	1995	1997	Frank Keating
Jerry Regier	1997	2002	Frank Keating
Howard Hendrick	2002	2003	Frank Keating

Secretary of Health (2003–2011)

Name	Took office	Left office	Governor served under
Tom Adelson	2003	2004	Brad Henry
Terry Cline	2004	2006	Brad Henry
Michael Crutcher	2006	2009	Brad Henry
Terri L. White	2009	2011	Brad Henry

Secretary of Human Services (2003–2011)

Name	Took office	Left office	Governor served under
Howard Hendrick	2003	2011	Brad Henry

Secretaries of Health and Human Services (2011–2019)

Name	Took office	Left office	Governor served under
Terry Cline	February 1, 2011	2018	Mary Fallin

Secretaries of Health and Human Services (2019–Present)

Name	Took office	Left office	Governor served under
Jerome Loughridge	2019	2020	Kevin Stitt
Kevin Corbett	2020	2024	Kevin Stitt
Corey Finch	2024	Present	Kevin Stitt
