= Oklahoma Secretary of Health =

- Great Seal of Oklahoma

Agency overview
- Formed: 1986
- Preceding agency: Oklahoma Secretary of Health and Human Services
- Headquarters: 120 N Robinson; Oklahoma City, Oklahoma
- Employees: 4,651 (FY2020)
- Annual budget: $6.7 billion (FY2020)
- Minister responsible: Kevin Corbett, Secretary of Health
- Child agencies: Oklahoma State Department of Health; Oklahoma Department of Mental Health; Oklahoma Health Care Authority

The Oklahoma secretary of health was a member of the Oklahoma governor's Cabinet. The secretary is appointed by the governor, with the consent of the Oklahoma Senate, to serve at the pleasure of the governor. The secretary served as the chief advisor to the governor on public health issues and needs.

The current secretary of health is Kevin Corbett, who was appointed by Governor Kevin Stitt in 2020, following the departure of Jerome Loughridge.

== Overview ==
The secretary of health was established in 1986 to provide greater oversight and coordination to the public health and mental hygiene activities of the state government. The position was established, along with the Oklahoma governor's Cabinet, by the Executive Branch Reform Act of 1986. The Secretary advises the governor on public health policy and advises the state's public health agencies on new policy as directed by the governor. The secretary also provides the overarching management structure for the state's public health services in order to deliver improved public services while eliminating redundancies and reducing support costs in order to more effectively and efficiently run the agencies in a unified manner. As the state's chief public health official, the secretary oversees vaccinations, disease prevention, mental health services, substance abuse treatment, and emergency health responses. The secretary also is responsible for regulation of the State health delivery system, overseeing state-managed public hospitals, health-related professional licensure, as well as overseeing the state's Medicaid program.

Oklahoma state law allows for Cabinet secretaries to serve concurrently as the head of a state agency in addition to their duties as a Cabinet secretary. Historically, the secretary of health has also served as either the commissioner of the Oklahoma State Department of Health or the commissioner of the Oklahoma Department of Rehabilitation Services. However, former secretary Loughridge did not share this role with either position.

Under the administration of Kevin Stitt, the cabinet position is labeled as the secretary of health and mental health, emphasizing its role in overseeing the Health Department and the Department of Mental Health and Substance Abuse Services. In previous administrations, the position is consolidated with the Oklahoma secretary of human services into the position of Oklahoma secretary of health and human services, as was the case under governors Frank Keating and Mary Fallin.

The secretary, unless filling an additional role which carries a greater salary, is entitled to annual pay of $85,000. Loughridge, however, did not take a salary.

== Budget ==
The secretary of health oversees a budget for Fiscal Year 2020 of $6.7 billion. The budget authorization is broken down as follows:

Agency	Funding (in millions)	Employees (in FTEs)
Health Services
Department of Health	405.7	2,184
Department of Mental Health and Substance Abuse Services	438.7	1,721
Tobacco Settlement Endowment Trust	51.9	25
Physician Manpower Training Commission	5.5	6
SUBTOTAL	901.8	3,936
Public Hospitals
University Hospital Authority	121.1	0
OSU Medical Authority	16.4	0
SUBTOTAL	137.5	0
Medical Assistance
Health Care Authority	5,619.3	601
SUBTOTAL	5,619.3	601
Professional Licensure
Professional Licensing Boards	17.5	114
SUBTOTAL	17.5	114
TOTAL	$6,676.1	4,651

== Agencies overseen ==
The secretary of health oversees the following state entities:

- Department of Health
- Department of Mental Health and Substance Abuse Services
- Health Care Authority
- Tobacco Settlement Endowment Trust

== List of secretaries ==
Name	Took office	Left office	Governor served under
Secretary of Health and Human Services
Ken Lackey	1995	1997	Frank Keating
Jerry Regier	1997	2002	Frank Keating
Howard Hendrick	2002	2003	Frank Keating
Secretary of Health
Tom Adelson	2003	2004	Brad Henry
Terry Cline	2004	2006	Brad Henry
Michael Crutcher	2006	2009	Brad Henry
Terri L. White	2009	2011	Brad Henry
Secretary of Health and Human Services
Terry Cline	2011	2017	Mary Fallin
Steven Buck	2017	2019	Mary Fallin
Secretary of Health and Mental Health
Jerome Loughridge	2019	Present	Kevin Stitt
