= 2011 Oklahoma state budget =

2011 Budget of the Oklahoma state government
- Submitted by: Brad Henry
- Submitted to: 52nd Legislature
- Total revenue: $6.73 billion (estimated)
- Total expenditures: $6.9 billion (request) $6.7 billion (enacted)
- Website: http://www.ok.gov/osf/Budget/index.html Oklahoma Office of State Finance

The Oklahoma State Budget for Fiscal Year 2011, is a spending request by Governor Brad Henry to fund government operations for July 1, 2010–June 30, 2011. Governor Henry and legislative leader approved the budget in May 2010. This was Governor Henry's eight and final budget submitted as governor.

Figures shown in the spending request do not reflect the actual appropriations for Fiscal Year 2011, which must be authorized by the Legislature.

== Overview ==
Oklahoma's $6.7 billion state budget for FY2011 was approved in May 2010 and is $400 million less than the previous budget. State revenues declined almost 17% in FY2010, down approximately $945 million from FY2009. As a result, lawmakers cut state agency budgets 7.5% midway through FY2010. Then lawmakers relied on a combination of fee hikes, deferred tax credits and further cuts to state agencies (3% cut in general) to help balance the FY2011 budget. That was not, however, enough and lawmakers additionally relied on $500 million in federal stimulus money and $277 million in funds from the Constitutional Reserve Fund to balance the FY2011 state budget.

Oklahoma has nearly $600 million remaining in its Constitutional Reserve Fund, but has limitations in using it to fill the budget shortfall. Three-eighths of the fund may be used to fill the 2010 mid-year gap, three-eighths may be used for the next fiscal year, and the remaining quarter may be used in a declared emergency by the governor with a three-quarter vote of the Legislature.

== Revenue Increases ==
The Governor's budget identified the following measures to increase State revenue:

=== Revenue Raising Measures ===
- $49.3 million - increase fees for services, licenses, and permits for various State agencies
- $45 million - one-year moratorium on select income tax credits
- $37.5 million - repeal income tax credit for capital investment in rural businesses
- $20 million - double fee to receive an oversized load permit for commercial vehicles
- $16.4 million - maintain penalty fine from late registration of motor vehicle as General Revenue
- $11.6 million - consider federal tax debt forgiveness as taxable income
- $11.3 million - repeal income tax credit for capital investment in rural business
- $10.6 million - double fee for copy of certified driving records
- $9.95 million - lower discount for electronic sales tax filling from 2.25% to 1%
- $9 million - revise tax credit for the conversion of motor vehicle from traditional fuels to electric cars
- $9 million - increase vending machine decal permit from $50 to $150
- $7.8 million - change due date for delinquent franchise tax payments
- $6.1 million - repeal discount for the timely remittance of motor fuel taxes
- $4.9 million - direct tax on tobacco to General Fund
- $4.2 million - revise tax on tobacco products from value-based to weight-based
- $3.5 million - expand sales tax to electronically delivered items
- $3 million - change sales tax remittance schedule
- $2 million - change beer, wine, and liquor wholesaler tax remittance schedule
- $0.8 million - Oklahoma Tax Commission to adopt Multistate Tax Commission model statutes
- $0.4 million - tax little cigars at same rate as cigarettes

=== Tax Compliance Measures ===
- $95 million - automated enforcement of vehicle insurance compliance
- $95 million - collect tax sales on remote businesses

=== Bonding Measurers ===
- $195 million - Oklahoma Department of Transportation bond for road and bridge construction
- $38 million - bond for the purchase of State office equipment and vehicles

=== Cash Transfer Measurers ===
- $85 million - redirect excess agency fees to General Revenue
- $554 million - Constitutional Reserve Fund to General Revenue
- $42.5 million - excess Gross Production Tax revenue to education funds
- $696 million - American Recovery and Reinvestment Act

=== Cuts and Saving Measurers ===
- $50 million - consolidation of State information technology under State Chief Information Officer
- $8.7 million - one-time reduction of agency pass-through payments to local governments and non-profits
- $5.3 million - consolidation of the following State agencies:
  - Oklahoma Bureau of Narcotics and Dangerous Drugs Control to Oklahoma State Bureau of Investigation
  - Oklahoma Chief Medical Examiner's Office to Oklahoma State Bureau of Investigation
  - Oklahoma Council on Law Enforcement Education and Training to Oklahoma Department of Public Safety
  - Oklahoma Department of Emergency Management to Oklahoma Department of Public Safety
  - Oklahoma Alcoholic Beverage Law Enforcement Commission to Oklahoma Department of Public Safety
  - Will Rogers Memorial to Oklahoma Historical Society
  - JM Davis Military Museum to Oklahoma Historical Society
  - Employee Benefits Council to Oklahoma Office of Personnel Management
  - Oklahoma Merit Protection Commission to Oklahoma Office of Personnel Management
  - Oklahoma Aeronautics Commission to Oklahoma Department of Commerce
  - Oklahoma Conservation Commission to Oklahoma Department of Agriculture
  - Combine Oklahoma Department of Environmental Quality and Oklahoma Water Resources Board
  - Oklahoma Department of Mines to Oklahoma Department of Labor
  - Indian Affairs Commission to Oklahoma Department of Commerce
  - Oklahoma Center for the Advancement of Science and Technology to Oklahoma Department of Commerce
- $386 million - reduce State agency FY2010 appropriations by 7.5%
- $66 million - reduce State agency FY2011 appropriations by 3% from FY2010

== Key Funding Issues ==
The Governor's budget identifies the following key funding issues:

- Education - reduce Oklahoma State Department of Education, Oklahoma State Regents for Higher Education, and Oklahoma Department of Career and Technology Education budgets by 0.5% and reduce all other Education Cabinet agencies by 5%
- Health, Human Services, and Veterans Affairs
  - $33 million to Oklahoma Health Care Authority in FY2010 supplemental appropriations
  - Reduce Oklahoma Department of Human Services, Oklahoma State Department of Health, Oklahoma Department of Mental Health and Substance Abuse Services, Oklahoma Department of Veterans Affairs and the Oklahoma Department of Rehabilitation Services budgets by 0.5%
- Public Safety
  - $7.2 million to Oklahoma Department of Corrections in FY2010 supplemental appropriations
  - Reduce Oklahoma Department of Corrections and Oklahoma Department of Public Safety budgets by 0.5%

== Revenue ==
=== Budgeted Revenue ===
Estimated tax revenue for fiscal year 2011 is $5.3 billion, an estimated decrease of 22% from FY2010 amounts of $6.8 billion:

- $1.709 billion - Sales and Use Tax (33%)
- $1.703 billion - Individual Income Tax (32%)
- $519 million - Gross Production Tax (10%)
- $172 million - Corporate Income Tax (3%)
- $145 million - Motor Vehicle Tax (3%)
- $28 million - Other Taxes (1%)
- $722 million - Other (14%)

All revenue of the $6.8 billion budget revenue breaks down as follows:

- $5.3 billion - All taxes (78%)
- $203 million - Revenue increases (3%)
- $190 million - Tax enforcement (3%)
- $259 million - Rainy Day Fund (4%)
- $696 million - American Recovery and Reinvestment Act (10%)
- $225 million - Other revenue measurers (3%)

=== Collected Revenue ===
The following figures represent actual tax revenue collected by month for Fiscal Year 2011 and deposited within the State's General Fund:

FY11 Month	Amount (in millions)	% Change from FY10 Collections	% Change from FY11 Estimate	Source
July	$370.1	10%	12%	
August	$350.8	5%	0%	
September	$459.7	6%	4%	
October	$427.7	7%	4%	
November	$345.9	9%	(3)%	
December	$454.5	13%	4%	
January	$490.3	19%	4%	
February	$247.1	12%	4%	
March	$438.5	9%	11%	
April	$576.8	13%	(3%)	
May	$414.7	10%	7%	
June	$576.0	16%	13%	
TOTAL	$5,152.1	10.5%	4.5%	N/A

Fiscal Year 2011 ended with a budget surplus over estimated revenue. The $219 million surplus was deposited into the State Constitutional Reserve Fund and may be used by the Oklahoma Legislature in future years to shore up sudden drops in tax revenues.

Collected General Fund revenue for fiscal year 2011 was $5.1 billion, an increase of 10.5% over FY2010 amounts of $4.6 billion:

- $2.1 billion - Individual Income Tax
- $1.7 billion - Sales and Use Tax
- $488 million - Gross Production Tax
- $199 million - Motor Vehicle Tax
- $642 million - All others

== Spending ==
=== Requested ===
The projected gross state product is listed at $155 billion. The fiscal year 2011 spending represents 4.3% of GSP.

The Governor's budget for FY2011 totals $6.9 billion in total spending requests. Percentages in parentheses indicate percentage change compared to 2010. The budget request is broken down by the following expenditures:

- FY2010 Supplementals - $101 million

- Appropriations by Cabinet Department: $6.8 billion (-3%)
  - $3.7 billion - Education (+2%)
  - $1.2 billion - Health (-2%)
  - $698 million - Human Services (-1%)
  - $653 million - Safety and Security (-1%)
  - $209 million - Transportation (+0%)
  - $79.9 million - Finance and Revenue (-2%)
  - $75.5 million - Judiciary (-2%)
  - $69 million - Commerce and Tourism (-18%)
  - $38.5 million - Agriculture (-3%)
  - $37.1 million - Veterans Affairs (-1%)
  - $33.4 million - Legislature (-3%)
  - $23.7 million - Human Resources and Administration (-2%)
  - $19.8 million - Science and Technology (-3%)
  - $14.2 million - Environment (-3%)
  - $11.3 million - Energy (-3%)
  - $11 million - Military (-3%)
  - $6.8 million - Secretary of State (-4%)
  - $2.8 million - Governor and Lieutenant Governor (-4%)
- Appropriations by agency: $6.8 billion
  - $2.5 billion - Department of Education
  - $1.0 billion - State Regents for Higher Education
  - $920.1 million - Health Care Authority
  - $517.3 million - Department of Human Services
  - $466.9 million - Department of Corrections
  - $209.2 million - Department of Transportation
  - $187.6 million - Department of Mental Health and Substance Abuse Services
  - $145.5 million - Department of Career and Technology Education
  - $101.1 million - Office of Juvenile Affairs
  - $85.9 million - Department of Public Safety
  - $75.0 million - Judiciary
  - $68.4 million - Department of Health
  - $41.5 million - Tax Commission
  - $37.1 million - Department of Veterans Affairs
  - $35.7 million - District Attorneys Council
  - $33.6 million - Legislature
  - $29.9 million - Department of Agriculture
  - $28.2 million - Department of Commerce
  - $27.6 million - Department of Rehabilitation Services
  - $23.2 million - Department of Tourism and Recreation
  - $21.8 million - Office of State Finance
  - $198.2 million - Other Agencies

=== Appropriations ===
The Oklahoma Legislature approved total appropriations for fiscal year 2011 of $6.7 billion. Percentages in parentheses indicate percentage change compared to the Governor's budget. The final appropriations are broken down by the following expenditures:

- Appropriations by Cabinet Department: 6.7 billion (-2%)
  - $3.5 billion - Education (-4%)
  - $1.23 billion - Health (+2%)
  - $723 million - Human Services (+4%)
  - $653 million - Safety and Security (+0%)
  - $115 million - Transportation (-45%)
  - $86.3 million - Finance and Revenue (+8%)
  - $80.8 million - Judiciary (+7%)
  - $79.2 million - Commerce and Tourism (+15%)
  - $36.1 million - Agriculture (-6%)
  - $36 million - Veterans Affairs (-3%)
  - $32 million - Legislature (-4%)
  - $23.1 million - Human Resources and Administration (-3%)
  - $19.2 million - Science and Technology (-3%)
  - $13.8 million - Environment (-3%)
  - $10.9 million - Energy (-4%)
  - $10.8 million - Military (-2%)
  - $9.1 million - Secretary of State (+34%)
  - $2.6 million - Governor and Lieutenant Governor (-7%)
