= Terri L. White =

American politician

Oklahoma Secretary of Health
- In office 2009–2011
- Governor: Brad Henry
- Preceded by: Mike Crutcher
- Succeeded by: Terry Cline

Commissioner of the Oklahoma Department of Mental Health and Substance Abuse Services
- In office 2007–2020
- Governor: Brad Henry; Mary Fallin
- Preceded by: Terry Cline
- Succeeded by: Carrie Slatton-Hodges

Personal details
- Born: October 4, 1973 (age 52) Edmond, Oklahoma
- Website: Oklahoma Department of Mental Health and Substance Abuse Services

Terri L. White (born 1973) was the chief executive officer of the nonprofit Mental Health Association Oklahoma, from August 2020 to May 2024. She is an American social worker who resigned effective February 1, 2020 as Commissioner of the Oklahoma Department of Mental Health and Substance Abuse Services, a position held since May 13, 2007. White previously served Democratic Governor of Oklahoma Brad Henry as a member of his Cabinet concurrent to her service as commissioner. White served as Henry's fourth Secretary of Health, becoming the first woman in State history to hold that post. Upon the election of Henry's successor, Republican Mary Fallin, White ceased being a member of the governor's Cabinet but retained her position as commissioner.

== Education and early career ==
White is a graduate of Edmond Public Schools in Edmond, Oklahoma. She received her Bachelor of Arts in social work in 1997 and a master's degree in social work in 1998, both from the University of Oklahoma. After graduating from OU, White accepted a position with the Oklahoma Senate where she would remain until 2001. While working for the State Senate, she worked as a policy analyst and then as a fiscal analyst. As a fiscal analyst, White worked for both the Human Services (2000–01) and the General Government and Transportation (1999–2000) appropriations subcommittees, analyzing budget requests and evaluating agency performance for twenty-seven state agencies.

== Mental Health Association Oklahoma ==
Terri joined Mental Health Association Oklahoma as chief executive officer from August 2020 to May 2024. Under her direction, the Association continues to expand the reach of its innovative programs and services designed to serve Oklahomans, and their loved ones, affected by mental illness, homelessness, substance use and justice involvement.

As Oklahoma's premiere boots-on-the-ground nonprofit serving this population, the Association provides approximately 30,000 Oklahomans a year with life-saving services when they need it the most via an annual budget of just under $20 million.

To learn more about Mental Health Association Oklahoma, visit mhaok.org.

== Oklahoma Department of Mental Health and Substance Abuse Services ==
White joined the Oklahoma Department of Mental Health and Substance Abuse Services in 2001 and has served that department in multiple capacities. In her time with the department, she has served as deputy commissioner for Communications and Prevention, director of Communications and Public Policy, and a management analyst. She has also served as the executive director of two ODMHSAS field facilities – the Tulsa Center for Behavioral Health Co-Occurring Unit and the Central Oklahoma Community Mental Health Center. Concurrently with each of these positions, White served as the chief liaison to the Oklahoma Legislature for the department.

In 2007, while White was serving as the department's director of Communications and Public Policy, then Commissioner Terry Cline resigned after being nominated by (then) President of the United States George W. Bush to become the administrator of the Substance Abuse and Mental Health Services Administration, an agency within the United States Department of Health and Human Services. Following Cline's resignation, on May 13, 2007, the State Board of Mental Health appointed White commissioner of the department as Cline's successor. As commissioner, White served as the chief executive of the department.

== Secretary of Health ==
In January 2009, Governor Brad Henry, following the resignation of Mike Crutcher, appointed White to serve has his fourth Secretary of Health. As Health Secretary, Secretary White is responsible for overseeing the Oklahoma State Department of Health and the Oklahoma Department of Mental Health and Substance Abuse Services. White serves concurrently as both Secretary of Health and ODMHSAS commissioner. Upon Republican Mary Fallin, Henry's successor as governor, assuming office, White ceased being a member of the governor's Cabinet but retained her position as commissioner.

== See also ==
- Oklahoma State Cabinet

Political offices
Preceded by Mike Crutcher	Oklahoma Secretary of Health; Under Governor Brad Henry; 2009–11	Succeeded by Terry Cline; As Secretary of Health and Human Services
Preceded by Terry Cline	Oklahoma Commissioner of Mental Health and Substance Abuse Services; Under Governors Brad Henry and Mary Fallin; 2007 - present	Incumbent
