= Howard Hendrick =

American politician

Oklahoma Secretary of Human Services
- Incumbent
- Assumed office 2003
- Governor: Brad Henry
- Preceded by: Himself; As Secretary of Health and Human Services

Oklahoma Secretary of Health and Human Services
- In office 2002–2003
- Governor: Frank Keating
- Preceded by: Jerry Regier
- Succeeded by: Tom Adelson; As Secretary of Health; Himself; As Secretary of Human Services

Oklahoma Director of Human Services
- Incumbent
- Assumed office July 1, 1998
- Governor: Frank Keating (1998–2003); Brad Henry (2003–present)

Member of the Oklahoma Senate from the 30th district
- In office 1987–1998
- Succeeded by: Glenn Coffee

Personal details
- Born: December 22, 1954 (age 71) Oklahoma City, Oklahoma, U.S.
- Party: Republican
- Occupation: Lawyer, businessman
- Website: Oklahoma Department of Human Services

Howard Hendrick (born December 22, 1954) is a Republican politician from the U.S. state of Oklahoma. Hendrick was serving as the Oklahoma Secretary of Human Services, having been appointed by Democratic Governor of Oklahoma Brad Henry in 2003.

Hendrick had previously served as the Oklahoma Secretary of Health and Human Services under former Republican governor Frank Keating until that post was split into two positions under Henry. Concurrent with his service as Secretary, Hendrick has served as the director of Oklahoma Department of Human Services since July 1, 1998. Hendrick is also a former Oklahoma state senator, having served from 1987 until 1998.

Hendrick is one of three Cabinet secretaries appointed by former governor Frank Keating to be held over by Governor Brad Henry, the others being: Human Resources Secretary Oscar B. Jackson Jr. and Veterans Affairs Secretary Norman Lamb.

== Education and early career ==
Hendrick was born in 1954 and raised in Bethany, Oklahoma. He graduated summa cum laude from Southern Nazarene University earning his undergraduate degree in accounting. During his years at Southern Nazarene, he was active in Circle K International, the collegiate affiliate of Kiwanis International, holding numerous elective offices, including international president.

Three years after graduating from SNU, Hendrick passed the Certified Public Accountant's examination and earned both a Master of Business Administration and a Juris Doctor degree from the University of Oklahoma. Upon graduation from law school, he was elected to Order of the Coif in recognition of his legal scholarship for graduating in the top 10 percent of his law school class. He practiced business, real estate and tax law for 17 years.

== Oklahoma Senate ==
Hendrick was elected to the Oklahoma Senate in 1987, representing parts of northwest Oklahoma City, Bethany, Oklahoma, Yukon, Oklahoma and Warr Acres, Oklahoma. He would serve in the Senate until 1998.

During his tenure, he amassed a career roll-call voting record in excess of 99 percent. He served two years as the Republican Floor Leader in the State Senate. For many years, he served as the Senate's representative to the Oklahoma State Pension Commission and the legislative representative to SoonerStart, the Interagency Coordinating Council for Early Childhood Interventions. Hendrick has also served on several national committees for legislative organizations, primarily sharing state solutions to America's health care and welfare problems.

== Career at DHS and 2012 Resignation ==
Hendrick was appointed Director of the Oklahoma Department of Human Services by the State Commission on Human Services on July 1, 1998. With offices in all 77 counties of Oklahoma, Hendrick leads a staff of nearly 7,300 employees and administers a $2.1 billion budget. Hundreds of thousands of Oklahomans are affected daily by more than 40 state and federal human services programs administered by his Department.

Hendrick and other DHS Commissioners were publicly criticized following several high-profile child deaths from abuse and neglect.

In 2008, Children's Rights, along with Oklahoma law firms Fredric Dowart Lawyers, Seymour & Graham LLP, Day, Edwards, Propester & Christensen PC, and international firm Kaye Scholer, filed a lawsuit against Hendrick, other commissioners of the Department of Human Services, and the governor of Oklahoma. The suit was filed on behalf of the nine named plaintiffs and more than 10,000 children in Oklahoma who had been removed from their homes by the state. The Complaint alleged violations of the constitutional rights of the children in the state's care by routinely placing them in unsafe, unsupervised and unstable living situations, where they were frequently subjected to further maltreatment. The parties settled the case in 2012 with an agreement for independent oversight of the Department.

== Secretary under governors Keating and Henry ==
Following the resignation of Jerry Regier to run for Governor of Oklahoma in 2002, Hendrick was appointed by Governor Frank Keating, and fellow Republican, as his Secretary of Health and Human Services. When Democrat Brad Henry was elected, Hendrick was asked to stay on during his administration.

When Henry took office, he issued an executive order that split the position of Secretary of Health and Human Services into two different posts: the Secretary of Health and the Secretary of Human Services. Hendrick was appointed by Henry to fill the latter. From 2003–2011 as secretary for human services, Hendrick was responsible for overseeing the Oklahoma Department of Human Services, the Oklahoma Department of Rehabilitation Services, and the Oklahoma Office of Juvenile Affairs. He also continued to serve concurrently as the director of human services.

== Personal life ==
He and his wife, Tracy, have been married for 34 years. They have four children: Chelsey, Cally, Christiana, and Hudson. His nights and weekends are stuffed with baseball, basketball, soccer, musicals, homework and hanging out with his 6 grandchildren.

He is active in numerous local and national, civic, professional and church organizations. He is a member of the Oklahoma Bar Association. He serves on the Executive Committee for the National Council of State Human Services Administrators. He serves on the boards of the National Children's Alliance, Nazarene Theological Seminary and the American Public Human Services Association.

Locally, he served as chairman of the state employees State Charitable Campaign for seven years and serves on the United Way of Greater Oklahoma City Advisory Board of Trustees. He has served on the church board at Bethany First Church of the Nazarene for many years. The Oklahoma Institute of Child Advocacy named him to the Child Advocates Hall of Fame in 2003. In 2004, he was one of four Americans to receive the National Public Service Award for leadership in public administration from the American Society of Public Administration and National Academy of Public Administration.

Political offices
Preceded by	Oklahoma Director of Human Services; Under Governors Frank Keating and Brad Henry; July 1, 1998–present	Incumbent
Preceded by Jerry Regier	Oklahoma Secretary of Health and Human Services; Under Governor Frank Keating; 2002 – January 13, 2003	Succeeded by Post split Tom Adelson as Secretary of Health and Himself as Secretary of Human Services
Preceded by Himself as Secretary of Health and Human Services	Oklahoma Secretary of Human Services; Under Governor Brad Henry; January 13, 2003–present	Succeeded by Incumbent
