= Oklahoma Secretary of Human Services =

- Great Seal of Oklahoma

Agency overview
- Formed: 2003
- Headquarters: Sequoyah Building; 2400 N Lincoln Boulevard; Oklahoma City, Oklahoma
- Employees: 9115 (FY2011)
- Annual budget: $2.4 billion (FY2011)
- Minister responsible: Howard Hendrick, Secretary of Human Services
- Child agencies: Oklahoma Department of Human Services; Oklahoma Department of Rehabilitation Services; Oklahoma Office of Juvenile Affairs
- Website: Office of the Secretary of Human Services

The Oklahoma Secretary of Health is a member of the Oklahoma Governor's Cabinet. The Secretary is appointed by the Governor, with the consent of the Oklahoma Senate, to serve at the pleasure of the Governor. The Secretary serves as the chief advisor to the Governor on public health issues and needs.

The current Secretary of Health is Howard Hendrick, who was appointed by Governor Brad Henry in 2003.

== History ==
The position of Secretary of Human Services was established in 2003 when Governor Brad Henry issued an executive order splitting the former position of Secretary of Health and Human Services into the separate positions of Secretary of Health and Secretary of Human Services. The previous position was established, along with the Oklahoma Governor's Cabinet, by the Executive Branch Reform Act of 1986. The act directs the secretary of human services to advise the governor on public assistance policy and advise the state public assistance agencies on new policy as directed by the governor.

== Dual position ==
Oklahoma state law always for cabinet secretaries to serve concurrently as the head of a state agency in addition to their duties as a cabinet secretary. Historically, the secretary of human services has also served as either the director of the Oklahoma Department of Human Services. As of 2010, all human services secretaries have served in that dual positions.

Name	Other Position Held (if any)
Howard Hendrick	Director, Oklahoma Department of Human Services

== Responsibilities ==
The Secretary of Human Services oversees most public assistance programs offered by the State. Such programs include child care services, senior citizen assistance, child custody services, disability vocational services, and services to the blind and deaf. The Secretary also oversees services to juveniles, both treatment and corrections.

As of fiscal year 2011, the Secretary of Human Services oversees 9,115 full-time employees and is responsible for an annual budget of over $2.4 billion.

== Agencies overseen ==
The Secretary of Human Services oversees the following state entities:

- Department of Human Services
- Department of Rehabilitation Services
- Office of Juvenile Affairs

== Salary ==
The annual salary for the position of Secretary of Human Services set by state law at $80,000. Despite this, if the secretary serves as the head of a state agency, the secretary receives the higher of the two salaries. Incumbent secretary Howard Henrick serves as the director of the Department of Human Services. As such, she receives the salary allowed for that position. As of 2010, the annual salary for that position is $163,000.

== List of secretaries ==
Name	Took office	Left office	Governor served under
Secretary of Health and Human Services
Ken Lackey	1995	1997	Frank Keating
Jerry Regier	1997	2002	Frank Keating
Howard Hendrick	2002	2003	Frank Keating
Secretary of Human Services
Howard Hendrick	2003	2011	Brad Henry
Secretary of Health and Human Services
Terry Cline	2011	2017	Mary Fallin
Steven Buck	2017	2019	Mary Fallin
Secretary of Human Services and Early Childhood Initiatives
Steven Buck	2019	Present	Kevin Stitt
