= Terry Cline =

American psychologist and public health policy specialist

Terry L. Cline

Oklahoma Secretary of Health and Human Services
- In office February 1, 2011 – October 30, 2017
- Governor: Mary Fallin
- Preceded by: Terri L. White
- Succeeded by: Jerome Loughridge (yet to be confirmed)

20th Commissioner of the Oklahoma State Department of Health
- Incumbent
- Assumed office June 30, 2009
- Governor: Brad Henry; Mary Fallin
- Preceded by: Michael Crutcher
- Succeeded by: Preston Doerflinger

Administrator of the Substance Abuse and Mental Health Services Administration
- In office December 2006 – August 2008
- President: George W. Bush
- Preceded by: Charles Curie
- Succeeded by: Pamela S. Hyde

Oklahoma Secretary of Health
- In office 2004–2006
- Governor: Brad Henry
- Preceded by: Tom Adelson
- Succeeded by: Michael Crutcher

Commissioner of the Oklahoma Department of Mental Health and Substance Abuse Services
- In office 2001–2006
- Governor: Frank Keating; Brad Henry
- Succeeded by: Terri L. White

Personal details
- Born: 1958 (age 67–68) Ardmore, Oklahoma
- Education: University of Oklahoma; Oklahoma State University
- Occupation: Psychologist
- Website: Oklahoma State Department of Health

Terry L. Cline (born 1958) is an American psychologist and public health policy specialist from Oklahoma. Cline resigned on October 30, 2017 from the Oklahoma State Department of Health. He has served in various positions under Governors of Oklahoma Frank Keating (R), Brad Henry (D), and Mary Fallin (R). Cline resigned his position after financial mismanagement was discovered within the Oklahoma State Department of Health.

Cline previously served as the administrator of the federal Substance Abuse and Mental Health Services Administration, an agency within the Health and Human Services Department (HHS) from December 2006 through August 2008. Prior to that, Cline served as the Commissioner of the Oklahoma Department of Mental Health and Substance Abuse Services as well as Oklahoma Secretary of Health under Governor of Oklahoma Brad Henry.

== Early career ==
Cline grew up in Ardmore, Oklahoma and attended the University of Oklahoma, where he earned a bachelor's degree in psychology in 1980. He then received both a master's degree and a PhD in clinical psychology from Oklahoma State University, following which he held a six-year appointment as a clinical instructor in the Department of Psychiatry at Harvard Medical School in Boston. Cline also served as the Chairman of the Governing Board for a Harvard Community Teaching Hospital in Cambridge for several years.

Cline served as a Health Care Policy Fellow at the federal Center for Mental Health Services in the Substance Abuse and Mental Health Services Administration in Washington D.C. While there, his primary focus was on the organization and financing of mental health services. During the 1990s, he served as the Clinical Director of the Cambridge Youth Guidance Center in Cambridge, Massachusetts and was employed as a Staff Psychologist at McLean Hospital in Belmont, Massachusetts.

== Keating Administration ==
Cline returned to Oklahoma to accept the position of Commissioner of the Oklahoma Department of Mental Health and Substance Abuse Services during the administration of Republican Governor Frank Keating. He began that role in January 2001. As Commissioner, Cline was responsible for providing public health services relating to mental illness and substance abuse.

== Henry Administration ==
Democratic Governor of Oklahoma Brad Henry appointed Cline as Secretary of Health in 2004 following the resignation of Tom Adelson to run for the Oklahoma Senate. Cline continued to serve concurrently as Commissioner in addition to his duties as Health Secretary. As Secretary, Cline served as Governor Henry's chief health policy advisor and had supervision over the Oklahoma State Department of Health and the Oklahoma Tobacco Settlement Endowment Trust.

== SAMSHA Administrator ==
President George W. Bush nominated Cline to serve as the Administrator of the Substance Abuse and Mental Health Services Administration, an agency of the United States Department of Health and Human Services, in November 2006, and his nomination was confirmed by the U.S. Senate in December.

At the end of August 2008, Terry Cline became the HHS Department's Health Attaché and representative at the U.S. Embassy in Baghdad, Iraq. As Health Attaché, Cline coordinated HHS programs in Iraq and provided advice to the U.S. ambassador, HHS Secretary and others. He also was a liaison to Iraq's Ministries of Health, Higher Education and Social Affairs, and worked with international organizations, private partners and other U.S. government agencies engaged in health-related activities in Iraq.

== State Health Commissioner ==
In June 2009 Cline became the Commissioner of the Oklahoma State Department of Health. He replaced Michael Crutcher who had retired the previous January.

== Fallin Administration ==
On February 1, 2011, Republican Governor of Oklahoma Mary Fallin announced she had selected Commissioner Cline to serve as the Oklahoma Secretary of Health and Human Services in her Cabinet. As Health and Human Services Secretary, Cline had oversight over all public health and public assistance agencies of the State government. Cline continued to serve as Health Commissioner in addition to his duties as a Cabinet Secretary.

== Resignation ==
On October 30, 2017, Cline submitted his resignation to the State Board of Health, during an emergency meeting of the Board. The Board named Preston Doerflinger as the Interim Commissioner of Health during the meeting. Cline's resignation was prompted by allegations of financial mismanagement within the Department, which were subsequently investigated by the Oklahoma State Auditor.

Political offices
Preceded by	Commissioner of the Oklahoma Department of Mental Health and Substance Abuse Services; Under Governors Frank Keating and Brad Henry; 2001–2006	Succeeded by Terri L. White
Preceded by Tom Adelson	Oklahoma Secretary of Health; Under Governor Brad Henry; 2004–2006	Succeeded by Michael Crutcher
Preceded by Charles Curie	Administrator of the Substance Abuse and Mental Health Services Administration; Under President George W. Bush; 2006–2008	Succeeded by Pamela S. Hyde
Preceded by Michael Crutcher	Commissioner of the Oklahoma State Department of Health; Under Governors Brad Henry and Mary Fallin; 2009–present	Incumbent
Preceded by Terri L. White	Oklahoma Secretary of Health and Human Services; Under Governor Mary Fallin; February 1, 2011 –present	Incumbent
