= Oklahoma Council on Law Enforcement Education and Training =

GOVERNMENT LAW ENFORCEMENT AGENCY

Council on Law Enforcement Education and Training
- Great Seal of Oklahoma

Agency overview
- Formed: 1963
- Headquarters: 2401 Egypt Road; Ada, Oklahoma
- Employees: 41 unclassified
- Annual budget: $7.2 million
- Ministers responsible: Michael Thompson, Secretary of Safety and Security; Sheriff John Whetsel, Chair of the Council
- Agency executives: Darry Stacy, Executive Director; Marcus Williams, Assistant Director; Jason Potter, Chief of Operations

The Council on Law Enforcement Education and Training (CLEET) is a government law enforcement agency of the state of Oklahoma which supports Oklahoma's state, county, and local law enforcement agencies by providing education and training which promotes professionalism and enhances competency within the ranks of Oklahoma law enforcement.

The council is composed of 13 members, each appointed by various methods. The Council elects, from among its own members, a chair and Vice Chair. All members of the Council serve without additional compensation. The Council appoints an executive director and assistant director to oversee the work and services of the agency.

The current CLEET Director is Steve Emmons.

== Duties ==
CLEET has the following responsibilities and duties:

- Establish guidelines and conduct basic training for all full-time peace officers in the State
- Provided continuing education programs for all full-time peace officers in the State
- Ensure that all agencies approved to conduct their own internal academies meet minimum standards as required by law
- Establish guidelines and conduct basic training for reserve peace officers
- License and regulate private security industry in the State

=== Relevant Statutes ===
Oklahoma statute Title 11: Cities and Towns §11-34-107 provides a list of issues they are required to be addressed by department policy. Complaints of non-compliance are handled by CLEET and considers the following issues including but not limited to:

- Search and seizure;
- Arrest and alternatives to arrest
- Strip and body cavity searches
- Evidence and property management
- Inventories and audits
- Use of firearms and use of force
- Pursuit driving
- Impartial policing/racial profiling
- Mental health
- Professional conduct of officers
- Domestic abuse
- Response to missing persons
- Supervision of part-time officers

== Council members ==
Agency	Member	Title	CLEET Position
Oklahoma Bureau of Narcotics and Dangerous Drugs Control	Darrell Weaver	Director, OBNDDC	
Oklahoma State Bureau of Investigation	Stan Florence	Director, OSBI	
Tribal Law Enforcement Agency	Randy Wesley	Chief, Chickasaw Nation Lighthorse Police	
Large City Police Department	Bill Citty	Chief, Oklahoma City Police Department	
Small City Police Department	Byron Cox	Chief, Weatherford Police Department	
Small County Sheriff Office	Ken Grace	Sheriff, Carter County Sheriff's Office	
Large County Sheriff Office	Paul D. Taylor	Sheriff, Oklahoma County Sheriff's Office	Chairman
Oklahoma Fraternal Order of Police	Jason M. Smith	1st Vice President Oklahoma State Fraternal Order of Police; Chief of Police, Anadarko Police Department	
East Central University	Vacant		
Immediate Past Chairman of CLEET	Norman McNickle	Director, City of Stillwater Department of Public Safety	
Oklahoma House Speaker appointee	Robert Ricks	Chief, Edmond Police Department	
Oklahoma Senate President pro tempore appointee	Michael Robinson	Chief, OSU Department of Public Safety	Vice Chairman

== Organization ==
- Council on Law Enforcement Education and Training
  - Executive Director
    - Assistant Director
      - Finance Division
      - Private Security Services Division
    - Chief of Operations
      - Administrative Services Division
      - Law Enforcement Training Division

=== Staffing ===
The Council on Law Enforcement Education and Training employs 47 employees as follows:

- 22 in the Administrative Services Division
- 19 in the Training Services Division
- 6 in the Private Security Services Division.

=== Budget ===
For Fiscal Year 2013 CLEET's operating budget is $6.7 million. Down from 2012 which was $6.8 million. CLEET's 2011 budget was $7.2 million. 2014 budget has not been approved by the Oklahoma Legislature at this time.

== See also ==
- Federal Law Enforcement Training Center
