= 2009 Tulsa mayoral election =

- November 10, 2009
- Turnout: 29.84%
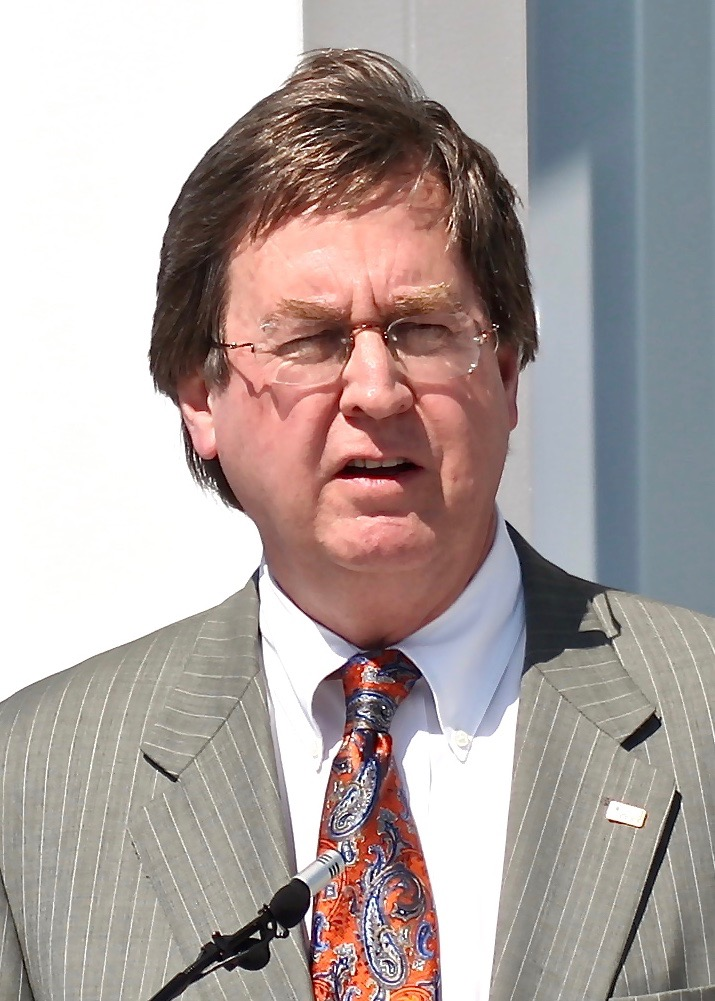

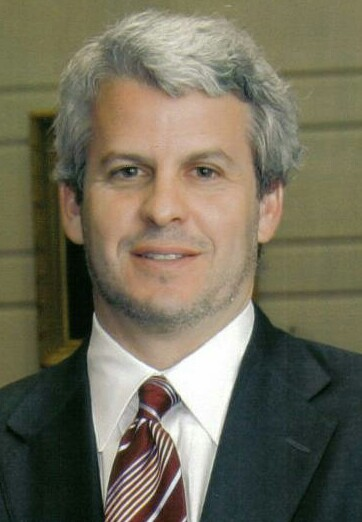

Nominee	Dewey Bartlett	Tom Adelson	Mark Perkins
Party	Republican	Democratic	Independent
Popular vote	29,948	24,211	11,913
Percentage	44.95%	36.34%	17.88%
Mayor before election
Kathy Taylor
Democratic
Elected mayor
Dewey F. Bartlett Jr.
Republican

The 2009 Tulsa mayoral election was held on November 10, 2009, to elect the mayor of Tulsa, Oklahoma. It resulted in the election of Dewey F. Bartlett Jr., the Republican candidate.

The stage for the 2009 election was set when incumbent Democratic mayor Kathy Taylor opted not to seek reelection. The primary election, held on September 8, 2009, resulted in the selection of state senator Tom Adelson as the Democratic nominee and Bartlett, a former councilman, as the Republican. This led to a rematch of the 2004 state senate election in which Adelson defeated Bartlett. Two independents were also on the ballot. Polling conducted a week before the primary gave Bartlett about a 10-point head-to-head lead over Adelson; and polling the week before the general election, which also included the independent candidates, showed an 8-point lead for Bartlett.

In the November 10 general election, Bartlett received about 45% of the vote to Adelson's 36% and 18% for independent Mark Perkins. Adelson conceded early in the evening as the results became apparent. Bartlett took office on December 7, 2009.

== Democratic primary ==
=== Candidates ===
==== Nominee ====
- Tom Adelson, state senator, former Oklahoma Secretary of Health

==== Eliminated primary ====
- Accountability Burns, perennial candidate
- Prophet-Kelly Clark, perennial candidate
- Robert Gwin Jr., perennial candidate
- Paul Tay, perennial candidate

=== Results ===
Democratic primary
Party	Candidate	Votes	%
Democratic	Tom Adelson	12,588	93.86
Democratic	Accountability Burns	274	2.04
Democratic	Paul Tay	192	1.43
Democratic	Robert Gwin Jr.	190	1.42
Democratic	Prophet-Kelly Clark	168	1.25
Total votes		13,412	100.00

== Republican primary ==
=== Candidates ===
==== Nominee ====
- Dewey F. Bartlett, Jr., former City Councilor

==== Eliminated in primary ====
- Kevin Boggs
- Nathaniel Booth
- Anna Falling, former City Councilor
- Chris Medlock, former City Councilor and 2006 mayoral Candidate
- David O'Connor
- Paul Alan Roales
- Michael Lee Rush
- Norris Streetman
- John Porter Todd
- Michael Tomes Sr.

=== Results ===
Republican primary
Party	Candidate	Votes	%
Republican	Dewey F. Bartlett, Jr.	12,061	54.35
Republican	Chris Medlock	7,004	31.56
Republican	Anna Falling	2,178	9.82
Republican	Norris Streetman	246	1.11
Republican	Nathaniel Booth	227	1.02
Republican	Kevin Boggs	114	0.51
Republican	David O'Connor	104	0.47
Total votes		22,190	100.00

== Independents ==
=== Candidates ===
- Lawrence Kirkpatrick
- Mark Perkins

== General election ==
2009 Tulsa mayoral election
Party	Candidate	Votes	%
Republican	Dewey F. Bartlett, Jr.	29,948	44.95
Democratic	Tom Adelson	24,211	36.34
Independent	Mark Perkins	11,913	17.88
Independent	Lawrence Kirkpatrick	560	0.84
Total votes		66,843	100.00
Turnout			29.84
Republican gain from Democratic			
