= Oklahoma School for the Blind =

Coordinates: 35°45′21″N 95°19′43″W

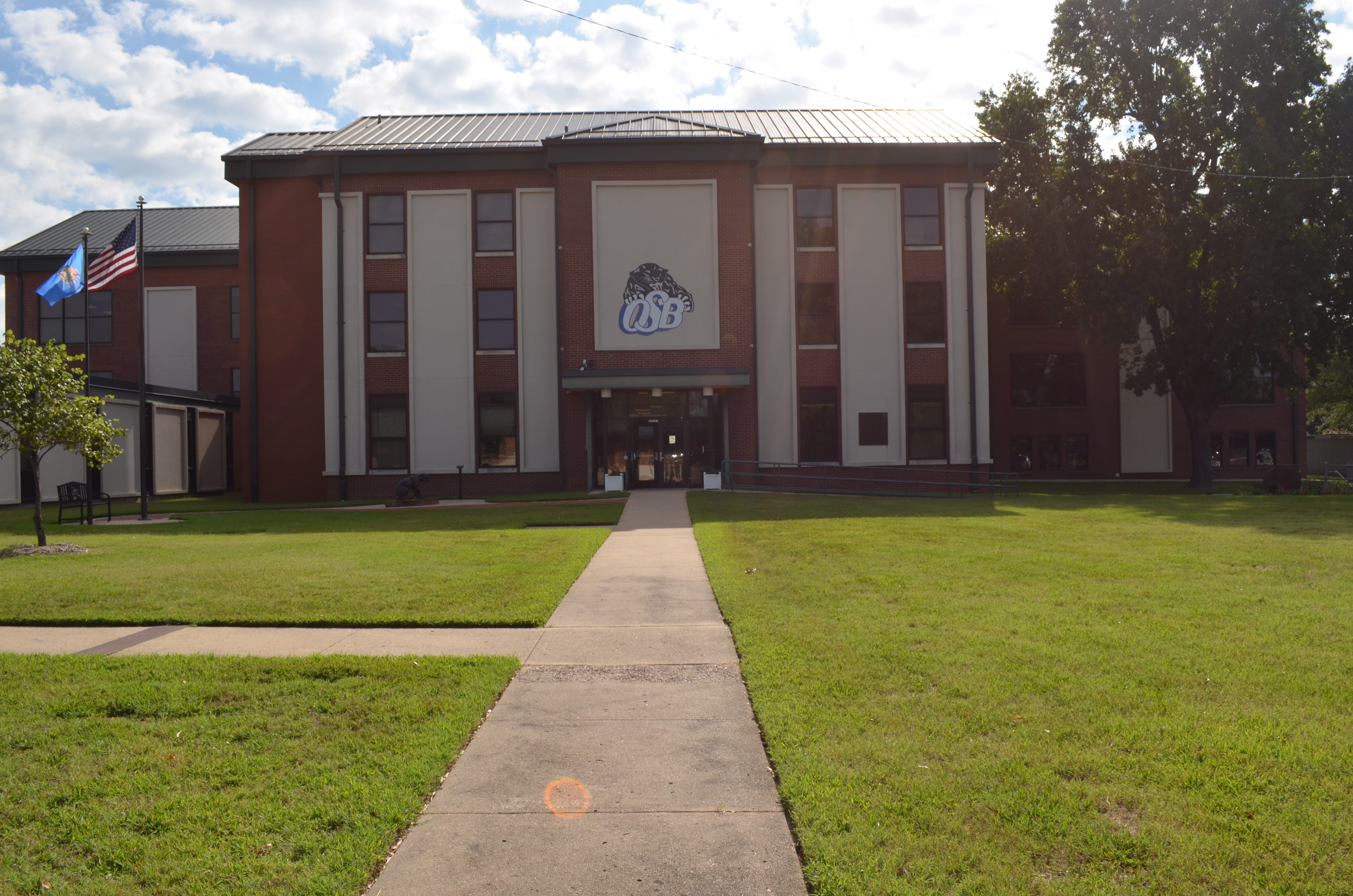
- Muskogee, Oklahoma

Information
- Type: Public School
- Established: 1897
- School district: Oklahoma
- Superintendent: Brent Pearce
- Principal: Brent Pearce
- Principal: Shawna Coplen
- Grades: Pre-K to 12th grade
- Color: Royal Blue
- Mascot: Panthers
- Affiliation: Oklahoma Department of Rehabilitation Services
- Website: osb.k12.ok.us

Oklahoma School for the Blind, also known as Parkview School, is a day and residential school located in Muskogee, Oklahoma for blind students up to grade 12.

== Failure of bill allowing charter schools for deaf ==
In 2013, Senate Bill 858 (SB 858), introduced in the Oklahoma Senate would have authorized the creation of private schools to educate deaf children. The argument in favor of the bill was that it would allow parents more choices in how they choose to educate their disabled children. The move alarmed teachers and parents of students at OSB, who realized that it could force closure of the state school in the future. They testified before the committee about how vital the specialized services and teachers were to their students' whole lives, and noted that charter schools did not have (and probably could not afford) such facilities and services. Their arguments were so persuasive that the bill failed to pass in the committee.

== Change of leadership and policy ==
An article by Tim Willert, published by the Oklahoman in November 2015, described concerns about the leadership of the school, particularly those expressed by parents of blind students. The Department of Rehabilitation Services Executive Director, Joe Cordova, had removed Superintendent Jim Adams in May, 2015, and hired Christine Boone, a noneducator and the wife of Doug Boone, the agency's director of visual services. Cordova told Adams that, "... the agency wanted to go in a different direction.

The specific issue apparently is that Cordova expressed dissatisfaction with outcomes for students after they have left high school. He says he has years of data showing that these graduates neither get good quality jobs nor do well in higher education. Cordova said he and Adams disagreed over how to improve this. Governor Mary Fallin asked her general counsel, Steve Mullins, to intercede in the dispute, which had generated a large public outcry. After interviewing the main players, Mullins said that this was due to differing views of two organizations devoted to the cause of blind children: National Federation of the Blind (NFB) and American Council of the Blind (ACB).

On February 1, 2016, Joe Cordova announced that he had selected Christine Boone as the permanent superintendent of the school. However, that did not settle the controversy, and some state legislators brought the matter to Governor Fallin. The controversy over school direction resulted in Joe Cordova's rescinding Boone's appointment and submitting his own resignation in early February, 2016. Noel Tyler was named executive director of the Department of Rehabilitation Services. Larry Hawkins, who had previously served 11 years as superintendent of the school, was hired to return as interim superintendent, effective March 1, 2016. It was the first major move made by Tyler as interim director.

== Campus ==
The school has dormitory facilities.
