= Oklahoma School for the Deaf =

Public residential school in Oklahoma, US

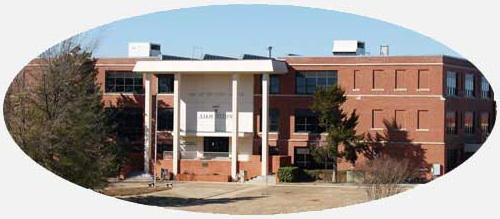

Location
- 1100 East Oklahoma Avenue; Sulphur, Oklahoma 73086; United States; 34°30′42″N 96°57′10″W

Information
- Type: Public residential school
- Motto: Oklahoma School for the Deaf provides a language-rich environment where everyone is empowered, encouraged and able to grow.
- Established: 1907
- School district: Oklahoma
- Superintendent: Heather Laine
- Dean: Trudy Mitchell
- Principal: Scharla Becker
- Grades: Pre-K to 12
- Colors: Green and White
- Mascot: Bison
- Affiliation: Oklahoma Department of Rehabilitation Services
- Website: www.osd.k12.ok.us

The Oklahoma School for the Deaf (OSD) is a public residential school for the deaf and hard of hearing students ages 2 through 18. The school teaches K–12 students in Sulphur, Oklahoma, United States.

== History ==
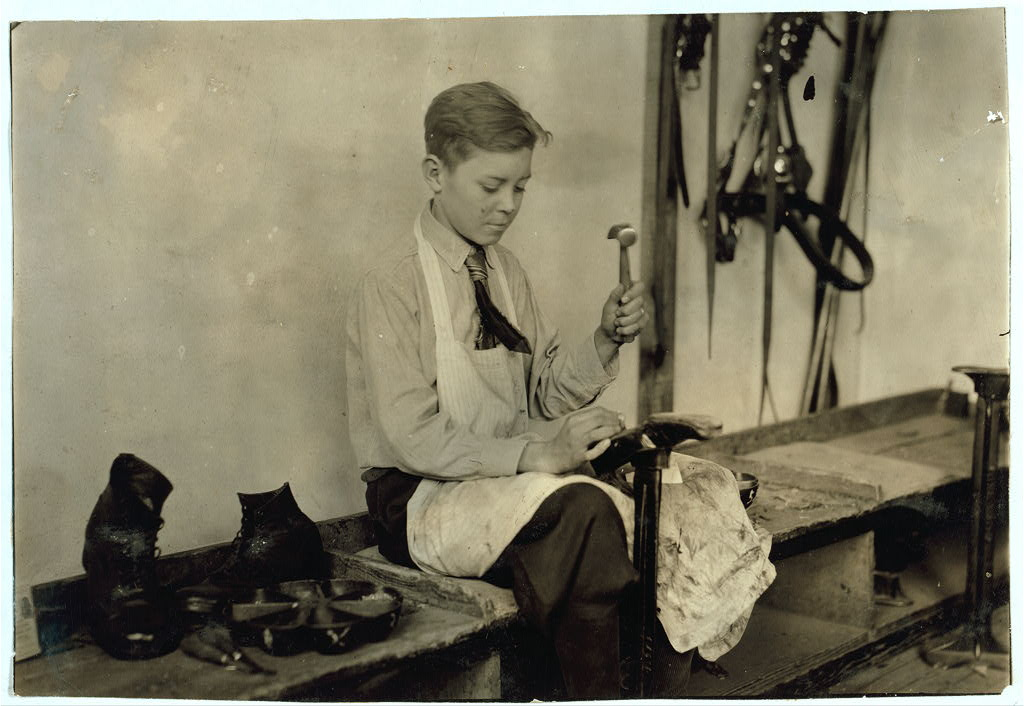
Learning to make shoes, 1917. Photo by Lewis Hine.

The first school in what would later become the state of Oklahoma to give instruction to deaf children was at Fort Gibson. (Note: Fort Gibson was then located in Indian Territory)This school, started by Rowland Lowery, provided for the education of deaf and blind Indian children of the Five Civilized Tribes. By the 1890s, white children were admitted at Fort Gibson. In 1898, Mr. and Mrs. Ellsworth Long (both Deaf) started a school for deaf children in Guthrie, then the capital of Oklahoma Territory known as the Oklahoma School for the Deaf and Dumb. In 1905, the school reported to have a total of 72 students. After the two territories merged to become the state of Oklahoma, in 1907, the Oklahoma School for the Deaf (OSD) was established in Sulphur, Oklahoma. In 1908, classes were held in rented buildings and hotels in the Sulphur business district. (Note: The first rented building in Sulphur was the three-story, brick Parkview School. After OSD moved out in 1913, it became the First Baptist Church.) Edna Patch was the first graduate of this school in Oklahoma, class of 1907. She later became the first deaf employee of the Oklahoma School for the Deaf.

Construction of new school buildings began in 1910. In 1911, the buildings under construction (about a quarter of a mile east and 100 yards south of the present location) fell in. With allegations of fraud, the buildings were condemned. (The original cornerstone was found, purchased, and donated to the school by Thomas Thompson, Betty Stephens, and Larry Hawkins.) Replacement buildings were begun at the present location in 1912 and the first classes were held in the fall of 1913.

OSD has grown from the original three buildings (Ralph H. White Education Center, Stewart Hall, and Read Hall) to a campus that includes the gym, auditorium, student union complex, superintendent's residence, Long Hall, Blattner Hall, Vocational Building, Griffing Hall, and the Physical Plant facilities.

In 1961, a major renovation was begun on all OSD buildings. Renovations were completed in 1980. In 1999–2000, a new renovation project was begun. By 2002, Long Hall, White Hall, Stewart Hall, and Blattner Hall were completed. Major repairs have been made to the gymnasium during this period.

=== Mascot ===
OSD is formally known as the Indians. It took several years to implement a change in its mascot. It started in 2016, when the school slowly began to remove Native imagery to a simple block with an O tied with two feathers. Until 2020 staff members and alumni gathered together to form a mascot committee which they collected feedback and input from the community to finalize the change. With the acceptance from the Oklahoma Department of Rehabilitation, OSD is now the Bison.

== Outreach program ==
The outreach program provides evaluations to children from age two to twenty-one, in-service training programs, and consultation for adaptations and modifications to the children's education environments. OSD provided 2,506 direct services to deaf or hearing-impaired students and 14,847 contacts of families, schools, and hearing impaired organizations.

== Funding ==
95% of OSD's budget is funded by state appropriations. The school receives IDEA-B funds through the State Department of Education for the students who are residential, and the IDEA funds for day students are kept by the school district where the child lives. The school receives small amounts of funding through Child Nutrition, Career Technology and the Department of Libraries, as well as Medicaid reimbursement for eligible children. The school does not regularly receive any other federal education funding. All of the federal funding received is discretionary and cannot be considered ongoing revenues.

== Campus ==
The school has a dormitories for students who live far from campus. OSD also has Early Childhood Education Centers in Chickasha, Edmond, and Sulphur.

=== Museum ===
The School for the Deaf has a museum in honor of Betty S. Fine who was a prominent keeper of the historical artifacts in the museum.

== Athletics ==
OSD is a member of the National Deaf Interscholastic Athletic Association (NDIAA), the National Deaf Cheer Competition (NDCC), the Fuller & Miller Donatucci Classic (FMDC), the Oklahoma Secondary School Activities Association, and their athletic conference is the Great Plains School for the Deaf (GPSD). OSD athletics compete in football, volleyball, cheer, basketball, track and the Special Olympics.

=== Conference Championships ===
Sport	Gender	Year	Conference
Basketball	Men	1990, 2020, 2024	GPSD
Basketball	Men	2025	Fuller & Miller Donatucci Classic
Basketball	Women	2006, 2007, 2009, 2016, 2019, 2020	GPSD
Track	Men	2019	GPSD
Cheer		1992, 1997, 2013, 2015, 2016, 2017, 2018, 2019	GPSD
Football	Men	1967	South Central Conference
Football	Men/Co-ed*	2008, 2012, 2014, 2018, 2019, 2022*, 2023*, 2024*, 2025*	GPSD
Volleyball	Women	2019	GPSD
Academic Bowl	Co-ed	2008,2015	GPSD

=== National Champions ===
Sport	Gender	Year
Football	Men/Co-ed*	1952, 2019, 2023*, 2024*, 2025*
Basketball	Men	1961, 2025
Basketball	Woman	2006
Cheer	Co-ed	2025

== Projects ==
The School for the Deaf partnered with the State Department of Education on two major projects. The first program, ECCO (Enriching Children's Communication Opportunities), is an early intervention program designed to work with parents of deaf children ages 3 to 6. The second project is a teaching and mentoring program to increase the sign proficiency levels of education interpreters in public schools.

OSD will continue its emphasis on literacy and math, demonstrating at least a one year's growth annually. Since February 2007, OSD's Captioned Film Library became the National Accessible Learning Center (NALC) which is the sole distributor of "Described and Captioned Media Program" media in the United States.

OSD plans to increase outreach services to students and adults through the programs at OSD. Examples include the ECCO program designed to help parents of young deaf children; the telecommunication distribution program for deaf, hard-of-hearing, and speech-impaired individuals; the senior citizen's and the children's hearing aid programs.

In 2011, the school undertook a fundraising campaign to upgrade and provide lights and bleachers for its rudimentary football stadium.

== Parent agency ==
The Oklahoma Department of Rehabilitation Services is the parent agency for the Oklahoma School for the Deaf.
