= OHCA =

OHCA may refer to:

- Oklahoma Health Care Authority
- Out-of-hospital cardiac arrest
- Otterhound Club of America
