= Circle K International =

International collegiate service organization

Circle K International – CKI
- Founded: 1936
- Founder: Jay N. Emerson
- Type: Service
- Location: Indianapolis, Indiana, United States
- Origins: Washington State College, Pullman, Washington
- Region served: Worldwide
- Method: Community service
- Members: 5,300
- Owner: Kiwanis International
- President: Jonathan Huang
- Revenue: US$767,348 (2006)
- Endowment: >US$160,000 (2005)
- Website: www.circlek.org

Circle K International (CKI) is an international collegiate service organization that is a service leadership program of Kiwanis International. It promotes service, leadership, and fellowship. It has over 5,000 members.

== Organization ==
Circle K International is a service organization formed to help the community through various service projects. It is part of an umbrella of organizations led by Kiwanis International. Circle K International also aims to build fellowship and create leaders within the membership.

The organization raises funds for various causes. The major initiative is: “Focusing on the Future: Children” which aims to help children of ages six to thirteen. In 2007, Circle K partnered with the U.S. Fund to help raise $500,000 for UNICEF in efforts to help children around the world who do not have access to clean drinking water. This is called "Saving Lives – The Six Cents Initiative." It got its name from the cost in U.S. funds, to purchase one pack of rehydration salts to purify a day's worth of drinking water. Their service partners include UNICEF, Students Team Up to Fight Hunger (STUFH), March of Dimes, Better World Books, Junior Chamber International, and the St. Baldrick's Foundation.

In 2017, Circle K International partnered with UNICEF to adopt the five-year signature project WASH. Circle K International aims to provide education, awareness, and funding to supply clean drinking water and sanitation education to schools and children in Haiti to target Haiti's emergency needs to reach 200,000 people in cholera-affected areas with a complete WASH response package.

== History ==
In 1936, the "Circle K House" at Washington State College was established by the Kiwanis Club of Pullman, Washington. Organized as a fraternity, Kappa Iota Phi served men who needed financial aid to attend college. Kiwanians also wanted to provide collegiate students leadership opportunities for their future careers and work service projects to better their communities while having a sense of fellowship. In 1947, Circle K changed from a fraternity to a service organization. That year, the first Circle K club was chartered at Carthage College in Carthage, Illinois. In 1949, two more clubs were added, and by 1955 there were 147 clubs, at which point Circle K received official endorsement from Kiwanis International. Circle K International adopted the Kiwanians beliefs by establishing the three tenets of Service, Leadership, and Fellowship to bring a sense of purpose to the organization.

The Kiwanis International Board of Trustees accepted a proposal to allow the establishment of Circle K Districts on February 22, 1957. The very first Circle K District to be officially recognized was the Texas-Oklahoma District. The second Circle K District was Kentucky-Tennessee which was closely followed by Michigan. Four more Districts were added in the 1957–58 administrative year: Missouri-Arkansas, California-Nevada-Hawaii, Ohio, and Alabama.

In 1971, delegates at the International Convention voted to allow women into the organization. The move was initially met with resistance by Kiwanis, which must approve all changes to the Circle K governing documents. After nearly two years of debate, the Kiwanis International Board of Trustees approved the change on February 6, 1973, and Circle K became the first co-ed organization in the Kiwanis Family. In 1984, Susan E. McClernon was elected the first female International President of Circle K International.

In 1975, Gregory Faulkner from the New York District was elected to the position of International President. Faulkner was the first African-American International President. Faulkner's election and the admission of female members was symbolic of the new level of maturity and responsibility Circle K International had assumed over 20 years of service, growth and development.

At the International Convention in 1987, the delegates approved the use of the initials CKI as an official name of the organization. That same year, Kiwanis International voted to allow women into Kiwanis clubs. Key Club had gone co-ed in 1977.

As of the end of 2005, membership consisted of over 13,250 college students in 17 nations around the world. Most of the Circle K membership currently resides in North America, in 30 Districts recognized by Kiwanis International. Twenty-seven districts are entirely within the United States, while three districts are international representing Canada and the Caribbean. These three Districts are the Pacific Northwest (made up of Oregon, Idaho, Washington, and the Canadian province of British Columbia and Yukon Territory), Western Canada (Alberta and Manitoba), and Eastern Canada and the Caribbean. Districts-in-Formation exist in Eastern Canada, Central and South America, Australia, and the Pacific Rim.

Circle K International celebrated its 50th anniversary at the 2005 International Convention in Greensboro, North Carolina. The International Convention's theme was, "CKI's 50th Anniversary: 50 Never Looked So Good".

In 2020, due to the COVID-19 pandemic in the United States, the 2019-2020 International Board announced on April 22, 2020, that the upcoming convention in Las Vegas was canceled. The event was rescheduled for July 18, 2020 - July 19, 2020 as the organization's first free virtual conference and had over 955 registered attendees. The International Council convened for a virtual meeting on July 21, 2020, to elect officers for the International Board and to consider amendments to the policy code. In June 2021, due to the continued threat of the pandemic, CKI members were invited to the Kiwanis Education & Leadership Conference in Salt Lake City, Utah instead of holding their own International Convention. Once again, the International Council convened for a meeting to elect officers for the International Board and to consider amendments to the policy code instead of holding the traditional full House of Delegates.

=== International Conventions (CKIx) ===
Year	Number	Location	Theme	Dates	Attendees	Refs
1953		Madison Square Garden, New York City (with Kiwanis)		June 22, 1953 – June 24, 1953		
1954		Carthage College, Carthage, Illinois		October 17, 1954 – October 19, 1954		
1955		Des Moines, Iowa		September 1, 1955 – September 4, 1955		
1956	1st	Temple University, Philadelphia, Pennsylvania		September 5, 1956 – September 8, 1956		
1957	2nd	Denver, Colorado		August 28, 1957 – August 30, 1957		
1958	3rd	Huntsville, Texas	See You at Sam Houston State Teacher's Cow-llege	August 26, 1958 – August 29, 1958		
1959	4th	Delaware, Ohio		August 26, 1959 – August 28, 1959		
1960	5th	Toronto, Ontario		August 24, 1960 – August 28, 1960		
1961	6th	St. Petersburg, Florida	Fun in the Sun in '61	August 23, 1961 – August 25, 1961		
1962	7th	San Diego, California	Si! Senor—San Diego	August 28, 1962 – August 30, 1962		
1963	8th	Norfolk, Virginia	Y'all Come	August 26, 1963 – August 28, 1963		
1964	9th	Chicago, Illinois	By the Lake Shore in '64	August 31, 1964 – September 3, 1964		
1965	10th	Miami Beach, Florida	Let's Meet in Miami Beach	August 30, 1965 – September 2, 1965		
1966	11th	Dallas, Texas	See You in Big D	August 21, 1966 – August 24, 1966		
1967	12th	Ottawa, Ontario	Circle K in Canada	August 27, 1967 – August 30, 1967		
1968	13th	Philadelphia, Pennsylvania		August 25, 1968 – August 28, 1968		
1969	14th	Portland, Oregon	Northwest in '69	August 31, 1969 – September 3, 1969		
1970	15th	New Orleans, Louisiana		August 23, 1970 – August 26, 1970		
1971	16th	Chicago, Illinois		August 22, 1971 – August 25, 1971		
1972	17th	Denver, Colorado		August 27, 1972 – August 30, 1972		
1973	18th	Miami, Florida	By the Sea in '73...1,000 to Miami Beach	August 19, 1973 – August 22, 1973		
1974	19th	Los Angeles, California	By the Shore in '74	August 18, 1974 – August 21, 1974		
1975	20th	Toronto, Ontario	Climax in Canada	August 17, 1975 – August 20, 1975		
1976	21st	Washington, D.C.	Come to the Capital Convention	August 15, 1976 – August 18, 1976		
1977	22nd	Muehlebach Hotel, Kansas City, Missouri	Get Your Muehle Bach to Kansas City. It's No Bum Steer	August 14, 1977 – August 17, 1977		
1978	23rd	Orlando, Florida	Circle K's Magical Meeting	August 20, 1978 – August 23, 1978		
1979	24th	Marriott Hotel, Chicago, Illinois	Have a Great Chicago	August 19, 1979 – August 22, 1979		
1980	25th	Phoenix, Arizona	Celebrate the Silver	August 17, 1980 – August 20, 1980		
1981	26th	Philadelphia Marriott Hotel, Philadelphia, Pennsylvania	The Philly Feeling	August 16, 1981 – August 16, 1981		
1982	27th	Fort Worth, Texas	Lone Star and You! Fort Worth '82	August 14, 1982 – August 18, 1982		
1983	28th	Atlanta Marriott (now the Atlanta Sheraton), Atlanta, Georgia	Atlanta's the Place to be in '83	August 20, 1983 – August 23, 1983		
1984	29th	Milwaukee, Wisconsin	Catch the Spirit – Milwaukee '84	August 11, 1984 – August 15, 1984		
1985	30th	Seattle, Washington	Celebrate Service – 30 Years of Caring – Seattle, WA '85	August 17, 1985 – August 21, 1985		
1986	31st	Boston, Massachusetts	A Declaration of Commitment	August 16, 1986 – August 20, 1986		
1987	32nd	St. Louis, Missouri	Gateway To New Horizons	August 15, 1987 – August 19, 1987		
1988	33rd	Orlando, Florida	Celebrate a New Beginning	August 13, 1988 – August 17, 1988		
1989	34th	Cincinnati, Ohio	WCKI in Cincinnati: Rockin' to the 90's	August 19, 1987 – August 23, 1987		
1990	35th	Anaheim, California	35 Years...and the magic continues!	August 18, 1990 – August 22, 1990		
1991	36th	Baltimore, Maryland	Anchors Aweigh for Circle K	August 17, 1991 – August 21, 1991		
1992	37th	San Antonio, Texas	Sharing One Vision	August 15, 1992 – August 19, 1992		
1993	38th	Nashville, Tennessee	A Celebration of Service	August 14, 1993 – August 18, 1993		
1994	39th	St. Louis, Missouri	Envision Excellence	August 6, 1994 – August 10, 1994		
1995	40th	Phoenix, Arizona	Expanding Horizons, 40 Years of Service	August 5, 1995 – August 9, 1995		
1996	41st	Philadelphia, Pennsylvania	Service: Foundation For Our Future	August 10, 1996 – August 14, 1996	966	
1997	42nd	Chicago, Illinois	Moving on the Winds Of Change	August 2, 1997 – August 6, 1997	998	
1998	43rd	Ocho Rios, Jamaica	Oceans of Opportunity...CKI in Reggae Land	August 8, 1998 – August 11, 1998	922	
1999	44th	Houston, Texas	Saddle Up for Service	August 7, 1999 – August 11, 1999	972	
2000	45th	San Diego, California	Catch the Wave of Service	August 6, 2000 – August 11, 2000	1076	
2001	46th	Buffalo, New York	Lighting the Way to the Future: Service on the Edge	August 4, 2000 – August 9, 2000	944	
2002	47th	Carib Royale, Orlando, Florida	Service in the Sun	August 10, 2002 – August 14, 2002	1039	
2003	48th	Omni Severin Hotel, Indianapolis, Indiana	The Kiwanis-Family United in Service	July 2, 2003 – July 6, 2003	701	
2004	49th	Union Station Hyatt Regency, St. Louis, Missouri	A Family United in Service	June 30, 2004 – July 3, 2004	589	
2005	50th	Sheraton Greensboro Hotel at Four Seasons Greensboro, North Carolina	50 Never Looked So Good	August 12, 2005 – August 16, 2005	636	
2006	51st	Boston Park Plaza, Boston, Massachusetts	Navigating the Seas of Service	August 12, 2006 – August 15, 2006	555	
2007	52nd	Red Lion Hotel on the River, Portland, Oregon	Planting Seeds of Service	August 4, 2007 – August 7, 2007	525	
2008	53rd	Adam's Mark Hotel, Denver, Colorado	Reaching New Heights	August 6, 2008 – August 9, 2008		
2009	54th	Sheraton Birmingham, Birmingham, Alabama	Birmingham. Be there!	August 5, 2009 – August 8, 2009		
2010	55th	Washington University in St. Louis, St. Louis, Missouri	Meet us in St. Louis	August 4, 2010 – August 7, 2010		
2011	56th	Virginia Beach Resort Hotel, Virginia Beach, Virginia	Come for the fun, stay in the sun	June 22, 2011 – June 26, 2011		
2012	57th	Westin New Orleans Canal Place, New Orleans, Louisiana	Big Service in the Big Easy	June 27, 2012 – July 1, 2012		
2013	58th	Westin Bayshore and Vancouver Convention Center, Vancouver, British Columbia		June 26, 2013 – June 30, 2013		
2014	59th	Loews Vanderbilt Hotel, Nashville, Tennessee	Motto: The Sounds of Service			
2015	60th	JW Marriott and Indiana Convention Center, Indianapolis, Indiana	Kiwanis Centennial / Kiwanis 100	June 23, 2015 – June 27, 2015		
2016	61st	Sheraton Centre Toronto Hotel, Toronto, Canada	Motto: Following the PATH to Service	June 22, 2016 – June 26, 2016		
2017	62nd	Grand Hyatt San Antonio, San Antonio, Texas	Motto: The Sun Never Set on Service	July 5, 2017 – July 8, 2017		
2018	63rd	Marriott Magnificent Mile, Chicago, Illinois	Motto: The Best it's Ever Bean; co-hosted with Key Club International	July 4, 2018 – July 8, 2018		
2019	64th	Disney's Contemporary Resort, Orlando, Florida		June 26, 2019 – June 29, 2019		
2020	65th	Virtual Conference (originally Flamingo Las Vegas, Las Vegas, Nevada)	CKI NEXT	July 18, 2020 - July 19, 2020 (originally July 19, 2020 - July 22, 2020)		
2021	66th	Salt Palace Convention Center, Salt Lake City, Utah	Kiwanis Education & Leadership Conference	July 24, 2021 - July 26, 2021		
2022	67th	Sheraton Austin Hotel at the Capitol, Austin, Texas		July 24, 2022 - July 27, 2022		
2023	68th	DoubleTree Suites by Hilton Minneapolis Downtown, Minneapolis, Minnesota		June 21, 2023 - June 24, 2023		

== Governance ==
CKI operates on a three-tiered system similar to Kiwanis International and Key Club International. The International Board oversees organizational policy, growth and international expansion. The International Board is elected at the International Convention held in a different city each summer. The CKI Board is composed of an International President, Vice-President, and five trustees who represent assigned districts. The International Board meets in-person in July of each service year upon being elected for the annual CKI International Board Trainer.

=== District and Club Boards ===
District Boards provide support and guidance to the Circle K clubs within their geographical area. All districts are headed by a Governor, who oversees the District Board members that often consist of a District Secretary, District Treasurer, District Editor, and Lieutenant Governors. Several Districts combine two District positions into a District Secretary/Treasurer. In place of Lieutenant Governors, a number of Districts have incorporated presidents Councils. District Conventions are held every year (in February or March depending on the District) for member education, club officer training, and election of the next District Board. Districts are charged with implementing International policies within their represented clubs and otherwise enhancing the member experience. All District Boards are responsible for club building, Kiwanis Family relations, laws and regulations, membership retention/education, and planning District events for the membership (e.g., District Convention).

Club Boards (also known as club officers or club Executive Boards) are an important aspect of CKI, second only to the club members, as they are the elected leaders who work within their community. Club Boards work with their District Boards on membership recruitment strategies, Kiwanis Family projects, membership retention and education, and social events. Also, Club Boards plan community service projects and social events for their members. CKI recommends all clubs to elect their new Club Boards before their District Convention.

April 1 marks the CKI New Year each year, when club and district leadership transitions to newly elected officials.

== Past international presidents ==
Year	President	Home College	References
1953–1954	Kenneth B. Creasy^{[A]}	Ohio Wesleyan University	
1954–1955	Eugene C. Alford	Georgia Institute of Technology	
1955 – 1956	Richard B. Forde	Western Michigan College	
1956–1957	Wally D. Miller	San Diego State College	
1957–1958	Hal Helsley	San Diego State College	
1958–1959	Jack E. Whitescarver	Sam Houston State Teachers College	
1959–1960	Robert A. Maxwell	Ohio Wesleyan University	
1960–1961	John Hoyt Blalock	University of Alabama	
1961–1962	John W. Melton, III	University of Southwestern Louisiana	
1962–1963	James S. Mathews	Randolph-Macon College	
1963–1964	John H. de Boisblanc	Louisiana State University	
1964–1965	Thomas P. Ewbank	Indiana University	
1965–1966	John D. Eadinger	The University of Western Ontario	
1966–1967	James A. Smith	Louisiana State University	
1967–1968	David A. Keyko	Drew University	
1968–1969	Peter L. Andrus	University of Pennsylvania	
1969–1970	Michael F. Adams	David Lipscomb College	
1970–1971	Lloyd N. Hardesty	Idaho State University	
1971–1972	Ralph W. Kalish Jr.	George Washington University	
1972–1973	Segundo J. Fernandez	University of Miami	
1973–1974	George S. Latimer	Fordham University	
1974–1975	Craig A. Miller	College of Insurance	
1975–1976	Gregory W. Faulkner	Baruch College	
1976–1977	Howard H. Hendrick	Bethany Nazarene College	
1977–1978	Neil G. Giuliano	Arizona State University	
1978–1979	Paul L. Frantz	Montana State University – Bozeman	
1979–1980	Mark C. Musso	Wichita State University	
1980–1981	Thomas M. Andrews	Wright State University	
1981–1982	Kenneth P. Burke	University of South Florida	
1982–1983	David A. Kelly	University of Wisconsin–Oshkosh	
1983–1984	James D. Troyer	Pacific Lutheran University	
1984–1985	Susan E. McClernon	The College of St. Scholastica	
1985–1986	Randall S. Williams	Auburn University at Montgomery	
1986–1987	Delaine R. Swenson	Whitworth College	
1987–1988	Scott A. Bearby	University of Notre Dame	
1988–1989	Oliver P. "Opy" Yandle	Loyola University New Orleans	
1989–1990	Wendy L. Schrick	St Martin's College	
1990–1991	Jason I. Steiner	New York University and Hofstra University	
1991–1992	David B. Pilati	Bowling Green State University	
1992–1993	Jim Beck	Washington University in St. Louis	
1993–1994	Justin T. Core	Pierce College	
1994–1995	Matthew O'Keefe	Boston College	
1995–1996	Carol Clyde	Radford University	
1996–1997	Sujal Shah	Rutgers University	
1997–1998	Hugh Simmonds	University of the West Indies – Mona	
1998–1999	Cathy Lenter	West Virginia University	
1999–2000	Christopher Zock	Arizona State University	
2000–2001	Jayme Sloan	Arizona State University	
2001–2002	Cindy Brigham	Indiana University	
2002–2003	Rupert Welsh	University of the West Indies – Mona	
2003–2004	Dan Conrod	Southern Illinois University Carbondale	
2004–2005	Troy Dibley	George Washington University	
2005–2006	Brian Egger	Willamette University	
2006–2007	Alec Macaulay	Duke University	
2007–2008	Amanda Badali	Arizona State University	
2008–2009	Kristen Reed	State University of New York at Potsdam	
2009–2010	Jason Stewart	College of Wooster	
2010–2011	Amanda Marfisi	Angelo State University	
2011–2012	Steven Spriggs	Texas A&M University	
2012–2013	Josephine Lukito	State University of New York at Geneseo	
2013–2014	Daniel Tsang	Loyola University Chicago	
2014–2015	Kathy Le	University of Alberta	
2015–2016	Racheile Ricklefs	Indiana University	
2016–2017	Shayna Cole	Ball State University	
2017–2018	Justin Crofoot	The University of Alabama	
2018–2019	Laura Belmont	Arizona State University	
2019–2020	Billy Hackett	University of Florida	
2020–2021	Tana Early	The University of Alabama	
2021–2022	Kyle Lank	Rutgers University	
2022-2023	Tyler Kearns	Boston University	
2023-2024	Zachary Kahn	Northeastern University	
2024-2025	Taylor DiCicco	University of Alabama	
2025-2026	Jonathan Huang	Harvard University	

A. Mr. Creasy and Mr. Alford were president before a charter and separate constitution and by-laws were created for Circle K.
