= Death of Kelsey Smith-Briggs =

2005 homicide in Oklahoma, United States

Kelsey Smith-Briggs
- Born: Kelsey Shelton Smith-Briggs; December 28, 2002; Oklahoma City, Oklahoma, U.S.
- Died: October 11, 2005 (aged 2); Meeker, Oklahoma, U.S.
- Cause of death: Homicide - Blunt force trauma to the abdomen
- Resting place: Meeker, Oklahoma
- Parent(s): Lance Briggs and Raye Dawn Smith

Kelsey Shelton Smith-Briggs (December 28, 2002 – October 11, 2005) was a child abuse victim. She died at the home of her biological mother Raye Dawn Smith and her stepfather Michael Lee Porter. Her death was ruled a homicide. Kelsey had been "closely" observed by the Oklahoma Department of Human Services from January 2005 up to and including the day of her death.

== Birth and early childhood ==
Kelsey was born on December 28, 2002, in Oklahoma City, Oklahoma, to divorced parents. She lived with her mother and maintained contact with her paternal family. The first two years of her life were uneventful. Before January 2005, no signs of abuse were reported to authorities nor noticed by family members or Kelsey's day care staff.

== Abuse ==
From January 2005 to the end of her life, Kelsey had suffered several documented and confirmed incidences of child abuse. Her injuries included a broken collarbone, broken legs, and multiple bruises and abrasions on her face and body.

On January 17, 2005, the Oklahoma Department of Human Services (OKDHS) first confirmed abuse against Kelsey's mother after Kelsey was taken to a local emergency room with a broken collarbone, multiple bruises, and abrasions to Kelsey's lower back, buttocks, and thighs.

In April 2005, both of Kelsey's legs were broken. Medical examiners determined these were spiral fractures in different stages of healing and were caused by child abuse. After this incident, Kelsey was taken into OKDHS (State's) custody.

On June 15, 2005, Kelsey was placed into the home of biological mother Raye Dawn Smith and stepfather Michael Lee Porter by Associate District Judge Craig Key, against an OKDHS recommendation. The judge stated that the abuser was "unknown".

== Death ==
Kelsey Shelton Smith-Briggs died on October 11, 2005, at the home of her mother, Raye Dawn Smith, and her stepfather, Michael Lee Porter, in Meeker, Oklahoma. Her death was ruled a homicide from blunt force trauma to the abdomen.

== Trial, verdict and sentences ==
Michael Lee Porter (stepfather) was charged with sexual assault and first-degree murder, but in February 2007, he pleaded guilty to enabling child abuse and was sentenced to 30 years in prison.

Raye Dawn Smith (biological mother) was convicted on July 18, 2007, of enabling child abuse and was sentenced to 27 years in prison. She was denied her request for appeal.

== Kelsey Smith-Briggs Child Protection Reform Act ==
In March 2006, the Oklahoma state legislature passed the Kelsey Smith-Briggs Child Protection Reform Act to reform the way courts and the Oklahoma Department of Human Services (OKDHS) handle cases related to child abuse and neglect. The bill's co-author, Senator Harry Coates, presented the measure in committee.
