= Sallie Lewis Stephens Sturgeon =

American journalist, public health inspector, and social worker (c. 1870–1955)

- Born: c. 1870; Missouri, U.S.
- Died: March 13, 1955; Oklahoma City, U.S.
- Occupations: Journalist, public health inspector, social worker

Sallie Lewis Stephens Sturgeon (c. 1870 – March 13, 1955) was an American journalist, public health inspector, and social worker. She was the first woman in the U.S. to serve as a state health inspector. In 1908, Sturgeon founded The Oklahoma Lady, the state's first magazine for women, and later played a role in improving public sanitation in Oklahoma during her tenure with the State Health Department.

== Early life ==
Sallie Lewis Stephens was born in Missouri c. 1870. In 1894, she moved to Oklahoma City with her husband, Thomas H. Sturgeon, who initially worked for the Santa Fe Railroad before joining the Ardmore National Bank.

== Career ==
Sturgeon's career began in journalism. After moving to Ardmore, Oklahoma, she worked for The Statesman newspaper and then for the Daily Ardmoreite. While working for the latter, she established a dedicated section for women's news, covering topics such as etiquette, poetry, and profiles of notable American women.

In 1908, Sturgeon expanded her journalistic endeavors by founding The Oklahoma Lady, the first magazine for women in Oklahoma. The weekly publication featured articles on entertainment, biographical sketches, fashion, and other subjects of interest to women. In 1909, Sturgeon sold the magazine to Blanche D. Lucas, who eventually discontinued it. In 1910, Sallie and her husband returned to Oklahoma City when he became an aide to Lee Cruce, who had been elected as Oklahoma's second governor. Sturgeon established the Sturgeon News Service during this period. She also became a notable figure in the antisuffrage movement, working alongside women like Alice Robertson and Kate Barnard.

After her husband's sudden death in 1919, Sturgeon shifted her focus to public health. In 1920, governor James B. A. Robertson appointed her as an inspector for the Oklahoma State Health Department, making her the first woman in the United States to hold such a position. Her work involved inspecting hotels, restaurants, and other public accommodations, where she enforced sanitary standards with the slogan "Clean up or close up!" Despite opposition from business owners and some who believed health inspection was not a job for a woman, Sturgeon persisted in her duties. Sturgeon's health inspections revealed severe unsanitary conditions, including loose livestock, unclean privies, and contaminated food. Her inspections improved public health standards across Oklahoma.

During the Great Depression, Sturgeon worked as a social worker in Oklahoma City. She oversaw a community camp established to provide housing and sanitation for impoverished migrants. This initiative inspired similar projects in other states.

== Personal life ==
Sturgeon died on March 13, 1955, in Oklahoma City.
