= Tom Adelson =

American politician from Oklahoma

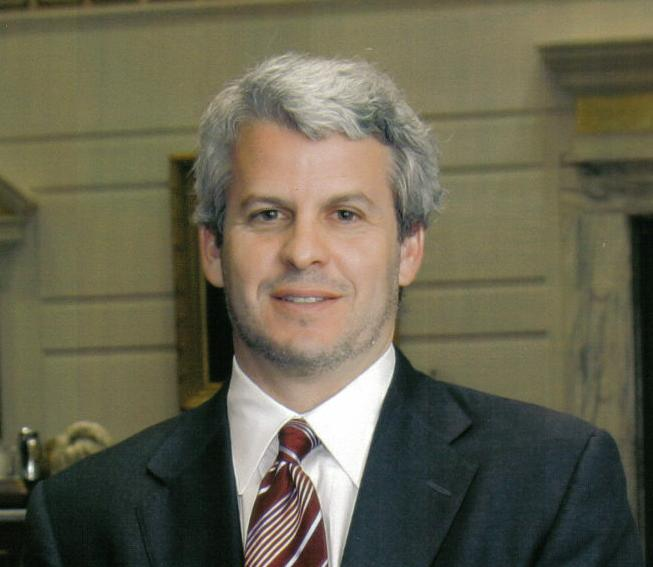

Member of the Oklahoma Senate from the 33rd district
- In office November 2004 – November 2012
- Preceded by: Penny Williams
- Succeeded by: Nathan Dahm

Oklahoma Secretary of Health
- In office 2003–2004
- Governor: Brad Henry
- Preceded by: Howard Hendrick; As Secretary of Health and Human Services
- Succeeded by: Terry Cline

Personal details
- Born: 1965 (age 60–61) Tulsa, Oklahoma, U.S.
- Party: Democratic
- Height: 5 ft 10 in (178 cm)
- Spouse: Bernadette Adelson
- Education: Stanford University, Dedman School of Law
- Profession: Attorney, educator, public administration

Tom Adelson is an American politician from Oklahoma. He was an Oklahoma State Senator representing the 33rd Senate District, located in Tulsa County, from 2004 to 2012. Adelson is a Democrat who was first elected in 2004. Prior to his election, Adelson served Governor of Oklahoma Brad Henry's first Oklahoma Secretary of Health from 2003 to 2004.

Adelson was the Democratic nominee for mayor of Tulsa in the 2009 election, but lost the general election to Republican nominee Dewey F. Bartlett Jr.

Adelson currently serves as the Vice President for Innovation at The University of Tulsa.

== Biography ==
Before running for the state senate, Adelson served as Oklahoma's Secretary of Health under Governor Brad Henry. He is an adjunct teacher at Booker T. Washington High School in Tulsa, where he teaches political philosophy. He has four children: Emily, Andrew, Sam and Jack. His father is Dr. Stephen Adelson, a Tulsa pediatrician. He graduated from Edison High School, Stanford University and SMU's Dedman School of Law.

== State senate ==
Adelson was first elected in 2004 to replace outgoing Senator Penny Williams. He defeated Republican Dewey F. Bartlett, Jr. by less than 1,000 votes. During the 2007 session, Adelson passed notable health care legislation. Adelson's 'All Kids Act' covers children whose families' income is between 185 and 300 percent more than the federal poverty rate. The expanded Medicaid coverage would help about 42,000 children in Oklahoma gain access to health care. The program signed into law by Governor Henry will be funded by revenue from the increase in the tobacco tax. During his tenure he was the only Jewish member of the Oklahoma Senate.

=== Leadership roles ===
In January 2009, Adelson was an Assistant Minority Floor Leader. He is a member of the Business and Labor Committee, the Finance Committee, and the Health and Human Services Committees.

On April 12, 2012, Adelson announced that he will not run for re-election when his current term expires.

== 2009 Tulsa mayoral election ==
On July 1, 2009, Adelson announced his candidacy for mayor of Tulsa, after current Mayor Kathy Taylor (D) decided not to seek re-election. Adelson was considered the frontrunner for the Democratic nomination, while 11 candidates sought the Republican nomination, including Dewey F. Bartlett Jr., whom Adelson had narrowly beat in the 2004 state senate election. On September 8, 2009, Adelson received 94% of the vote in the Democratic primary, setting him up to face Bartlett (who got 54% of the Republican primary vote) and two independents in the November general election. In the November 10 general election, Bartlett received about 45% of the vote to Adelson's 36% and 18% for independent Mark Perkins.

== Election results ==
=== 2009 Tulsa mayoral election ===
2009 Tulsa Mayoral General Election November 10, 2009
| Party | Candidate | Votes | % |
|---|---|---|---|
| Democratic | Tom Adelson | 24,211 | 36.34 |
| Republican | Dewey F. Bartlett, Jr. | 29,948 | 44.95 |
| Independent | Mark Perkins | 11,913 | 17.88 |
| Independent | Lawrence Kirkpatrick | 560 | 0.84 |
| Total votes | | 66,843 | 100 |
| Turnout | | | 29.84 |

Democratic Primary Election September 8, 2009

| Candidate | Votes | % |
|---|---|---|
| Tom Adelson | 12,588 | 93.86% |
| A. Burns | 274 | 2.04% |
| Paul C. Tay Jr. | 192 | 1.43% |
| Robert Arizona Gwin Jr. | 190 | 1.42% |
| Prophet Kelly Lamar Clark Sr. | 168 | 1.25% |

=== State senate elections ===
General Election November 4, 2008

| Candidate | Votes | % |
|---|---|---|
| Tom Adelson | 18,311 | 63.14% |
| Gary Casey | 10,688 | 36.86% |

General Election November 2, 2004

| Candidate | Votes | % |
|---|---|---|
| Tom Adelson | 15,836 | 51.48% |
| Dewey F. Bartlett, Jr. | 14,926 | 48.52% |

Democratic Primary Election July 27, 2004

| Candidate | Votes | % |
|---|---|---|
| Tom Adelson | 3,234 | 52.28% |
| Tim Gilpin | 2,952 | 47.72% |

Political offices
| Preceded by Howard Hendrick; As Secretary of Health and Human Services | Oklahoma Secretary of Health; Under Governor Brad Henry; 2003–2004 | Succeeded by Terry Cline |
| Preceded by Penny Williams | Oklahoma State Senator; 2004–2012 | Succeeded by Nathan Dahm |
Party political offices
| Preceded by Kathy Taylor | Democratic nominee for Mayor of Tulsa, Oklahoma; 2009 | Succeeded by Most recent |
