= Kiwanis =

International service club

Kiwanis International
- Founded: January 21, 1915; 111 years ago
- Founders: Joseph C. Prance and Allen S. Browne
- Type: Service
- Location: Indianapolis, Indiana, United States
- Origins: Detroit, Michigan, United States
- Region served: Worldwide
- Method: Community service
- Members: 592,820
- Key people: President Michael Mulhaul, Executive Director Paul Palazzolo
- Revenue: US$20,723,000 (2006)
- Endowment: US$15,792,322 (2019)
- Employees: 115
- Website: www.kiwanis.org

Kiwanis International (/kɪˈwɑːnɪs/ ki-WAH-nis) is an international service club founded in 1915 in Detroit, Michigan. It is headquartered in Indianapolis, Indiana, United States, and is found in more than 80 nations and geographic areas. In 1987, the organization began to accept women as members. Kiwanis and its affiliated clubs have more than 600,000 members. Kiwanis clubs raise over $100 million each year and report over 18.5 million volunteer hours to strengthen communities and serve children.

There are seven regions in Kiwanis: Africa; Asia-Pacific; Canada and Caribbean; Europe; Latin America; Middle East; and the United States and Pacific Canada. The United States and Pacific Canada Region incorporates the 50 states of the United States as well as British Columbia and the Yukon Territory of Canada.

There are fifty-three administrative areas called districts. District boards typically consist of a governor-elect, governor, immediate-past governor, secretary, treasurer, and several trustees or lieutenant governors. Districts are further divided into service areas called divisions, comprising 5 to 20 clubs and headed by a lieutenant governor. Clubs have boards consisting of a vice president (and/or president elect), president, immediate past president, secretary, treasurer, and typically about five directors. At both the district and club level, the secretary/treasurer may be combined by one person and may be a volunteer or a paid employee; all other positions are unpaid.

== Background ==
Kiwanis clubs decide for themselves what projects to do in their community, based on their own community's needs and their members' interests. Service to children is a primary focus in Kiwanis. Clubs are encouraged to conduct a community survey each year to determine what unmet needs exist in their community. In some cases, clubs in a geographic region (a "Division" or "District") may take on a project of shared interest, such as paediatric trauma, or children's cancer.

Kiwanis International is a volunteer-led organization led by a Board of Trustees with 19 members, including 15 trustees, four elected officers, and an executive director. The trustees are elected for three-year terms, with five trustees being elected each year.

== Etymology ==
The name “Kiwanis” was coined from the Ojibwe language expression derived from the word giiwanizi meaning to "fool around": ningiiwaniz, which is found in the Baraga Dictionary as "nin Kiwanis", meaning "I make noise; I am foolish and wanton" or "I play with noise". Although Random House Dictionary states that it comes from one of the Algonquian languages and means "to make oneself known", in Ojibwe and other related Algonquian languages, this expression would be gikendami'idizo. Whatever the original meaning may be, the organization's founders translated it as "We Build", which eventually became a motto of Kiwanis. In 2005 the organization chose a new motto, "Serving the Children of the World". Members of the club are called Kiwanians.

== History ==
The organization originated in August 1914 in Detroit, Michigan, from a conversation between Allen S. Browne and Joseph G. Prance. Browne's idea was to solicit business and professional men asking them if they would be interested in organizing a fraternal organization with a health benefit feature. Browne was compensated five dollars per new member that joined for his operating budget. Browne and Prance set out and recruited enough members to apply to the state for a not for profit status. The state approved the application on January 21, 1915, and the Supreme Lodge Benevolent Order Brothers were formed. The name was changed to Kiwanis a year later. The Kiwanis Club of Detroit is the original local club in Kiwanis. By 1927 the organization had more than 100,000 members.

Kiwanis became international with the organization of the Kiwanis Club of Hamilton, Ontario, Canada, in 1916. Kiwanis limited its membership to the United States and Canada until 1962, when worldwide expansion was approved. Since then, Kiwanis has spread to all inhabited continents of the globe.

The original purpose of Kiwanis was to exchange business between members and to serve the poor. The debate as to whether to focus on networking or service was resolved in 1919, when Kiwanis adopted a service-focused mission. In 1924, the Objects of Kiwanis were adopted and remain unchanged today.

Each year, clubs sponsor nearly 150,000 service projects, complete more than 18.5 million hours in volunteer service and raise more than $100 million. As a global project in coordination with UNICEF, members and clubs contributed more than $80 million toward the global elimination of iodine deficiency disorders (IDD), the leading preventable cause of intellectual disability. Beginning in 2010 Kiwanis International joined with UNICEF to launch a new worldwide health initiative, The Eliminate Project, dedicated to wiping out maternal and neonatal tetanus (MNT), which kills more than 100,000 babies worldwide each year.

Until 1987 the organization accepted only men as members. By action of the International Convention in 1987, the rules were changed to admit women as well. Women constitute about 26% of total members.

At the 2013 International Convention, Sue Petrisin was elected as the organization's first female international vice president. She became the first female president of Kiwanis in 2015, which made her the first woman to lead any international service organization. On June 7, 2026, Kiwanis filed a disclosure under the Lobbying Disclosure Act that they had hired a lobbying firm named LeMunyon Group. This was the first time Kiwanis has hired a lobbying firm.

== Service ==
Examples of service are a Kiwanis club in Denton, Texas that raised $10,000 for a 4th of July firework show after the city cut a $50,000 sponsorship for the event, a Kiwanis club in Princeton, New Jersey, that hosts an annual pancake breakfast, and a Kiwanis club in Lakewood, Ohio, that donated comfort bags to their local police and fire department.

As a global project in coordination with UNICEF, members and clubs contributed more than $80 million toward the global elimination of iodine deficiency disorders (IDD), the leading preventable cause of intellectual disability. Beginning in 2010 Kiwanis International once again joined with UNICEF to launch a new worldwide health initiative, dedicated to wiping out maternal and neonatal tetanus (MNT), which kills more than 50,000 babies and a significant number of women each year. The clubs are known for the "Kiwanis doll". Kiwanis dolls are simple white fabric dolls which is distributed to children and allows the children to color them in to represent themselves or someone else.

In 2007, the charitable financial arm, Kiwanis International Foundation, was awarded the top rating by Charity Navigator.

== Kiwanis organizations ==
Kiwanis provides leadership and service opportunities for youth through its Service Leadership Programs. Aktion Club, Key Club, Circle K, Builders Club and K-Kids are part of Kiwanis Service Leadership Programs. They are sponsored by a local Kiwanis club and receive funding and leadership guidance from Kiwanis.

=== Key Club ===
Kiwanis founded and supports Key Club International. Started in Sacramento, California, in 1925, Key Club is the oldest and largest service program for high school students in the world. As of 2010, Key Club has 250,000 members in 5,000 clubs in 30 nations, primarily in the United States and Canada, but with clubs also in Central and South America, Caribbean nations, Asia, and Australia. KIWIN'S (pronounced "kee-wins"), a high school program exclusive to the California-Nevada-Hawaii district, operates under the umbrella of Key Club but elects its own officers.

=== Circle K ===
The collegiate version of Kiwanis, which maintains some autonomy from Kiwanis, is Circle K International, also known as CKI. The first official Circle K club was chartered in September 1947 at the campus of Carthage College (then in Illinois). As of 2010, Circle K membership is 12,600 members in 500 clubs in 17 countries, making Circle K the largest collegiate service organization of its kind in the world.

=== K-Kids, Builders Club, Aktion Club, Kiwanis Junior ===
K-Kids is intended for grades 4–5 in elementary school, and has a membership of 33,000 in 1,100 clubs in 8 nations. Builders Club (middle school) has 42,000 members in 1,400 clubs in 12 nations. Aktion Club (for people who have disabilities) has 8,400 members in 400 clubs in 7 nations. These programs are all led by adult advisors (Kiwanians or faculty members), whereas Key Club and Circle K elect their own club, district, and International officers each year to lead the organization. Kiwanis Junior is part of the European Service Leadership Program, with clubs in Austria, Germany, the Netherlands, Belgium and Italy, and is typically for people ages 18–35.

=== Kiwaniannes ===
Before 1987, women's auxiliary clubs known as Kiwaniannes also existed, made up of wives of members of the men-only Kiwanis clubs. With the changes that made it possible for women to join Kiwanis clubs, official sponsorship of the Kiwaniannes clubs ended. Some Kiwaniannes clubs merged with their affiliated Kiwanis club, while others converted into independent Kiwanis clubs.

== See also ==
- List of civic, fraternal, service, and professional organizations
