= Oklahoma Bureau of Narcotics and Dangerous Drugs Control =

Agency of the government of Oklahoma

- Bureau of Narcotics and Dangerous Drugs Control patch

Agency overview
- Formed: May 15, 1975
- Jurisdiction: Government of the state of Oklahoma
- Headquarters: Oklahoma City, Oklahoma
- Employees: 129 commission agents
- Annual budget: $
- Agency executive: Donnie Anderson, Director
- Website: www.ok.gov/obndd/

The Oklahoma Bureau of Narcotics and Dangerous Drugs Control (OBN), often shortened to Oklahoma Bureau of Narcotics, is an agency of the government of Oklahoma charged with minimizing the abuse of controlled substances through law enforcement measures directed primarily at drug trafficking, illicit drug manufacturing, and major suppliers of illicit drugs.

The Bureau is governed by a seven-member commission whose members are appointed by the Governor of Oklahoma with the approval of the Oklahoma Senate. The commission is responsible for appointing a director. Donnie Anderson was appointed Director in March 2020.

== History ==
In 1953, the Oklahoma Legislature created the agency to enforce drug laws. Designated the Division of Narcotics Enforcement, the agency operated under the Attorney General of Oklahoma for the next decade. In 1964, the Division of Narcotics Enforcement was abolished and created under the name of the Oklahoma Bureau of Narcotics. The new bureau was placed under the direct command of the Governor of Oklahoma.

In the late 1960s, narcotics operations and drug-related crimes accelerated. Despite a merger into the Oklahoma State Bureau of Investigation (OSBI) in 1968, only one full-time narcotics agent was employed by the state. Recognizing this problem, the Legislature granted OSBI funds to establish a full-time narcotics unit, but by the early 1970s the unit had been proven a failure. In response, the Legislature passed the Uniform Control Dangerous Substances Act of 1971. The Act established the Commissioner of Narcotics and Dangerous Drugs Control under the direction of the Attorney General. The Commissioner was responsible for the state's general interest in controlled drugs but actual enforcement of the Controlled Substances Act was left to the OSBI.

It soon became apparent that this arrangement failed to respond to controlling the surging drug trade. Therefore, in 1975, the Oklahoma Bureau of Narcotics was reconstituted, this time more adequately staffed and equipped, and given the necessary autonomy to operate in the war on drugs. The Bureau has original jurisdiction statewide on all violations of the Uniform Control Dangerous Substances Act as well as crimes of human trafficking.

== Responsibilities ==
The Bureau of Narcotics is charged with enforcing the State's criminal and administrative drug laws. In particular, the Bureau's agents have responsibility for enforcing the following laws:

- Uniform Controlled Dangerous Substance Act - general law governing all narcotics and dangerous drugs
- Anti-Drug Diversion Act - criminalizes the use of legal drugs for illegal purposes
- Precursor Substances Act - regulates the use of chemicals used to manufacture illegal drugs
- Trafficking in Illegal Drugs Act - criminalizes the manufacturing and distribution of control substances
- Drug Money Laundering and Wire Transmitter Act - allows OBN to investigate money transactions for drug-related activities
- Oklahoma Methamphetamine Offender Registry Act - directs OBN to establish a centralized methamphetamine offender database
- All laws relating to money laundering and human trafficking

OBN trains and assists local law enforcement agencies in addition to compiling drug-related statistics. OBN also provides a leadership role for law enforcement throughout the state for the investigative effort directed towards eliminating the illegal use of controlled dangerous substances.

The Bureau serves as the law enforcement arm of the State government's approach to combating drugs. The Oklahoma Department of Mental Health and Substance Abuse Services serves as the prevention, education and treatment component. The two agencies work together to develop a comprehensive drugs control strategy for the State.

=== Rank structure ===
Title	Description	Comparative OHP rank
Director	Appointed by OBNDD Commission to be the professional head of the OBNDD.	DPS Commissioner
Deputy Director	Appointed by OBNDD Director to serve as second-in-command of the OBNDD.	Assistant DPS Commissioner
Division Chief Agent	Responsible for directing a Division of the OBNDD.	OHP Lt. Colonel
Agent in Charge	Responsible for directing District Offices or Specialized Units within the OBNDD.	OHP Captain
Assistant Agent in Charge	Responsible for directing investigations of a Regional Office or Specialized Unit within the OBNDD.	OHP Lieutenant
Agent III / Senior Agent	Responsible for leading broad, complex and highly specialized investigations. Will also be responsible for training new agents within OBNDD. The highest non-competitive career progression level of law enforcement within the OBNDD.	OHP Trooper
Agent II	Responsible for leading investigations and assisting lower level Agents in the performance of their duties.	OHP Trooper
Agent I	Responsible for entry level investigations within the OBNDD. Will be directly supervised by an Agent III during most of the investigative process.	OHP Cadet/Trooper

== Locations ==
The Bureau maintains a presence in all 77 counties within the state of Oklahoma. This is achieved by the combination of District Offices, Regional Offices, and agents assigned to specific counties of the state. The Bureau maintains District Offices in Oklahoma City, Tulsa, McAlester, Ardmore, Lawton and Woodward with Regional Offices in multiple other locations. The Bureau's headquarters is located in Oklahoma City, OK.

== Budget ==
The Bureau of Narcotics receives only about 16% of its budget from annual appropriations from the Oklahoma Legislature. Fees generated by the Bureau make up another 70%. The remaining 14% comes from various sources.

Employee benefits and salaries make up 76% of the budget, with operating expenses totaling 17% and other expenses accounting for 7%.

== See also ==
- List of law enforcement agencies in Oklahoma
- Oklahoma Highway Patrol
- Oklahoma State Bureau of Investigation
- Oklahoma Department of Public Safety
- Drug Enforcement Administration
