= Oklahoma Governor's Cabinet =

Advisors to the Oklahoma Governor

The Cabinet of the governor of Oklahoma is a body of the most senior appointed officials of the executive branch of the government of Oklahoma. Originally an informal meeting between the governor of Oklahoma and various government officials, the governor's Cabinet has evolved into an important information link between the governor and the various agencies, boards and commissions that operate within state government.

Cabinet officers are appointed by the governor, subject to confirmation by the Oklahoma Senate. Once confirmed, all members of the Cabinet receive the title "Secretary" and serve at the pleasure of the governor. The Cabinet is responsible for advising the governor on the operations and policies of the state government.

The current Cabinet is serving under Governor Kevin Stitt.

== History ==
When Governor of Oklahoma David Boren first took office, Oklahoma possessed no form of Cabinet system. Taking the example of other states, Governor Boren began holding semi-official and semi-regular meetings with various heads of state agencies whenever necessary. Under Boren’s successor, George Nigh, following the recommendation of the Nigh Commission, Oklahoma adopted an official Cabinet system with the enactment of the Executive Branch Reform Act of 1986 which created an overlay of cabinet secretaries. However, the act did not transfer the statutory and constitutional powers delegated to the agencies, boards and commissions over to the cabinet secretaries. Some citizens argue that it should have but others say that 12-15 people should not replace the hundreds of agencies, boards and commissions within the tradition of active participatory democracy form of governance.

In 2009, the Oklahoma Legislature amended the Executive Branch Reform Act to mandate the establishment of the secretary of information technology.

== Cabinet areas ==
The Executive Branch Reform Act first called for the creating of a Cabinet with no more than fifteen "cabinet areas" which were to consist of the various state agencies, committees, and boards with similar administrative objectives. These cabinet areas would not be agencies of the state and thus could not exercise the executive power of the state. They would only exist to better serve the governor in crafting policy and information gathering. The original law mandated only one cabinet area: one containing the Department of Veteran Affairs. The law has since been amended to mandate the creation of an Information Technology cabinet area. After that, the law allowed the governor to create the other fourteen cabinet areas at his discretion until the Oklahoma Legislature formally created the cabinet areas. The heads of these executive cabinet area would be given the title of "Secretary" followed by the name of their cabinet area (or a shortened title thereof).

The governor, within 45 days of taking office, is allowed to create his own cabinet, with anywhere from no less than 10 but no more than 15 "cabinet areas". The governor is allowed to create any cabinet area he desires and to place whichever agencies, bureaus, and commissions he wants under those cabinet areas. For example, under Governor Frank Keating, the Oklahoma Department of Tourism and Recreation and the Oklahoma Department of Commerce each belonged to separate cabinet areas, while under Governor Brad Henry the secretary of commerce and tourism was the cabinet secretary for both departments. Alternatively, under Governor Keating, the secretary of health and human services oversaw the Oklahoma State Department of Health and the Oklahoma Department of Human Services while Governor Henry split the posts into a separate secretary of health to oversee the Health Department and a separate secretary of human services to oversee the Human Services Department. Under the administration of Kevin Stitt, the Health Department and the Department of Mental Health and Substance Abuse Services are grouped under the same cabinet secretary.

Regardless of the number of cabinet areas and their functions, at least one must be the secretary of veteran affairs and must be charged with providing for Oklahoma's veterans and one must be the secretary of information technology and must be charged with overseeing state use of information technology and telecommunications.

Following the Oklahoma Supreme Court case of Keating v. Edmondson in 2001, it was deemed illegal for a governor to change the cabinet areas and their functions past the 45-day deadline unilaterally. In order to change a cabinet area after the first 45 days in office, the governor must seek approval from the Oklahoma Legislature via legislation.

== Cabinet secretaries ==
=== Appointment ===
All Cabinet secretaries are appointed by the governor, subject to confirmation by the Oklahoma Senate. Potential appointees for secretary positions may be appointed to serve as members of the Office of the Governor or may be selected from among the agency heads within the secretary's cabinet area. If the Senate is not in session when the governor nominates an individual, then the Cabinet secretary serves on an unconfirmed basis until the next session of the Senate. Each Cabinet secretary is appointed for a four-year term but may be removed at any time by the governor. The only exception to this rule is Oklahoma secretary of state, who serves a fixed four-year term.

Cabinet secretary positions are semi-formal and are not legally classified as "officers of the State". As such, Cabinet secretaries are allowed to hold another office within the state government. Examples of this include Matt Pinnell’s service as Lieutenant Governor of Oklahoma and Secretary of Tourism and Branding under Governor Kevin Stitt since 2019, and previously Scott Meacham, who served as both the secretary of finance and revenue and the state treasurer of Oklahoma under Governor Brad Henry from 2005 to 2011.

=== Powers and duties ===
Regardless of cabinet area, all Cabinet secretaries are responsible for advising the governor of any policy changes or problems within their area, advising the entities they represent of any policy changes or problems as directed by the governor, and for coordinating information gathering as requested by the legislature.

Cabinet secretaries do not possess the power to direct or control any agency they represent outside of their ability to gather information. They have no authority to direct or control any agency within their Cabinet area except their own direct staff. They also do not have the authority to hire or fire personnel in their Cabinet area except those on their own direct staff. The component agencies are directed and controlled by their respective department heads. The Cabinet secretaries may only direct a component agency when previously authorized by the governor through executive order or if a secretary serves concurrently as the head of that agency.

Each Cabinet secretary is subject to the direction and control of the governor. All agencies assigned to each Cabinet secretary exercise their powers and duties in accordance with the general policy established by the Cabinet secretary acting on behalf of the governor. Each Cabinet secretary has the power to resolve administrative, jurisdictional, operational, program, or policy conflicts between agencies or officials assigned to them, oversees and directs the formulation of program budgets for their assigned agencies, is responsible for holding their assigned agency heads accountable for their actions, and directs the development of goals, objectives, policies and plans for their assigned agencies.

== Current cabinet members ==
The current Cabinet serving under Governor of Oklahoma Kevin Stitt is as follows:

Office	Holder
Secretary of Agriculture	Blayne Arthur
Secretary of State	Benjamin Lepak
Secretary of Human Services	Jeffrey Cartmell
Secretary of Health and Mental Health	Clay Bullard
Secretary of Public Safety	Tricia Everest
Secretary of Transportation	Tim Gatz
Secretary of Commerce	Deborah Moorad
Secretary of Budget	John Laws
Secretary of Workforce Development	Vacant
Secretary of Operations and Government Efficiency	Marc Nuttle
Secretary of Tourism, Wildlife and Heritage	John Budd
Secretary of Veterans Affairs and Military	John Nash
Secretary of Energy and Environment	Jeff Starling
Secretary of Education	Dan Hamlin
Secretary of Licensing and Regulation	Adria Berry

== See also ==
- Government of Oklahoma
- Cabinet of the United States
- List of Oklahoma state agencies
