= Oklahoma Department of Mental Health and Substance Abuse Services =

- Great Seal of Oklahoma

Agency overview
- Formed: 1953
- Headquarters: 2000 N Classen Blvd Oklahoma City, Oklahoma
- Employees: 1971 (FY26)
- Annual budget: $463,819,692 (FY15)
- Agency executive: Gregory Slavonic, Interim Commissioner
- Website: Oklahoma Department of Mental Health and Substance Abuse Services

The Oklahoma Department of Mental Health and Substance Abuse Services (ODMHSAS) is an agency of the Government of Oklahoma responsible for providing public health services relating to behavioral health.

The department is governed by the Board of Mental Health and Substance Abuse Services, composed of nine members: five are appointed by the Governor of Oklahoma, two are appointed by the Speaker of the Oklahoma House of Representatives, and two are appointed by the President Pro Tempore of the Oklahoma Senate. The Governor of Oklahoma appoints the Commissioner of Mental Health and Substance Abuse Services to serve as the chief executive officer of the department. The department is currently served by Interim Commissioner Rear Admiral Gregory Slavonic.

The department was established in 1953 by the Mental Health Law of 1953. The law provides that all residents in the state are entitled to care and treatment for mental illness and addiction problems in accordance with appropriate standards of care.

== History and Function ==
The department was established through the Mental Health Law of 1953, although publicly supported services to Oklahomans with mental illness date back to before statehood: the first facility in Oklahoma for the treatment of individuals with mental illness was established by the Cherokee Nation, called the Cherokee Home for the Insane, Deaf, Dumb, and Blind, it was built outside the city of Tahlequah in 1873. Non-Indians with mental illness were sent out of state for treatment to the Oak Lawn Retreat in Jacksonville, Illinois, until a private company, the Oklahoma Sanitarium Company, located in Norman, Oklahoma, began treating the mentally ill on June 15, 1895. The department continues to operate a facility at this location today, now called Griffin Memorial Hospital.

Oklahoma's first state-operated facility for the treatment of mental illness opened in 1908, in Fort Supply, Oklahoma, and was called the Oklahoma Hospital for the Insane, later renamed Western State Psychiatric Hospital, and now called the Northwest Center for Behavioral Health. A year later, a second state-operated facility was opened in Vinita, Oklahoma, called the Eastern Oklahoma Hospital for the Insane, later renamed to the Oklahoma Forensic Center.

On October 31, 1963, President John F. Kennedy signed into law the Community Mental Health Act of 1963, which sparked a major transformation of the public mental health system by shifting resources away from large institutions towards community-based mental health treatment programs. Soon after the passage of this law, the department created the Central Oklahoma Community Mental Health Center (COCMHC), which was the first facility of its kind in the United States

== Services ==
The department provides services through a statewide network of programs. The core of the system is a network of 13 certified community behavioral health centers (CCBHCs), nonprofit agencies with which the ODMHSAS contracts, and six state-operated centers. The state is geographically divided into 12 service areas each served by a CCBHC (some CCBHCs serve multiple areas). Each CCBHC is responsible for providing a comprehensive array of services within its service area. However, individuals seeking services may choose to seek services anywhere in the state. This service structure is vastly different from the organization's original model for treatment in the mid-1960s, which was primarily in the form of institutionalization in large state hospitals.

In FY25, services were provided to approximately 195,000 individuals through the ODMHSAS system, but fewer than 5 percent of required hospital care. Most treatment takes part in mental health and substance use outpatient programs, targeted community-based services, prevention efforts and educational initiatives.

For individuals with mental illness, the department supports a continuum of care from community-based treatment and case management to acute inpatient care. The ODMHSAS operates three state hospitals for adults and one children's psychiatric hospital: the Oklahoma Forensic Center, Griffin Memorial Hospital, Tulsa Center for Behavioral Health and the Children's Recovery Center. Residential care services for adults with mental illness are provided by 15 separate residential home operators with which the ODMHSAS contracts. The department operates substance use treatment and support programs within state operated facilitates, including CCBHCs, and contracts for services with approximately 425 substance abuse treatment providers and 38 separate prevention programs. The department actively supports prevention programs to reduce the occurrence of substance abuse, prevent deaths by suicide, and promote mental health for all Oklahomans. The Oklahoma Bureau of Narcotics and Dangerous Drugs Control serves as the law enforcement arm. The two agencies work together to develop a comprehensive drugs control strategy for the State.

== Leadership ==
The department is currently led by Interim Commissioner Rear Admiral Gregory Slavonic. The Mental Health and Substance Abuse Board is the governing board of the department. The board is composed of nine members. Five are appointed by the Governor of Oklahoma, two are appointed by the Speaker of the Oklahoma House of Representatives, and two are appointed by the President Pro Tempore of the Oklahoma Senate. Each member shall serve at the pleasure of their appointing authority and may be removed or replaced without cause.

== Facilities ==
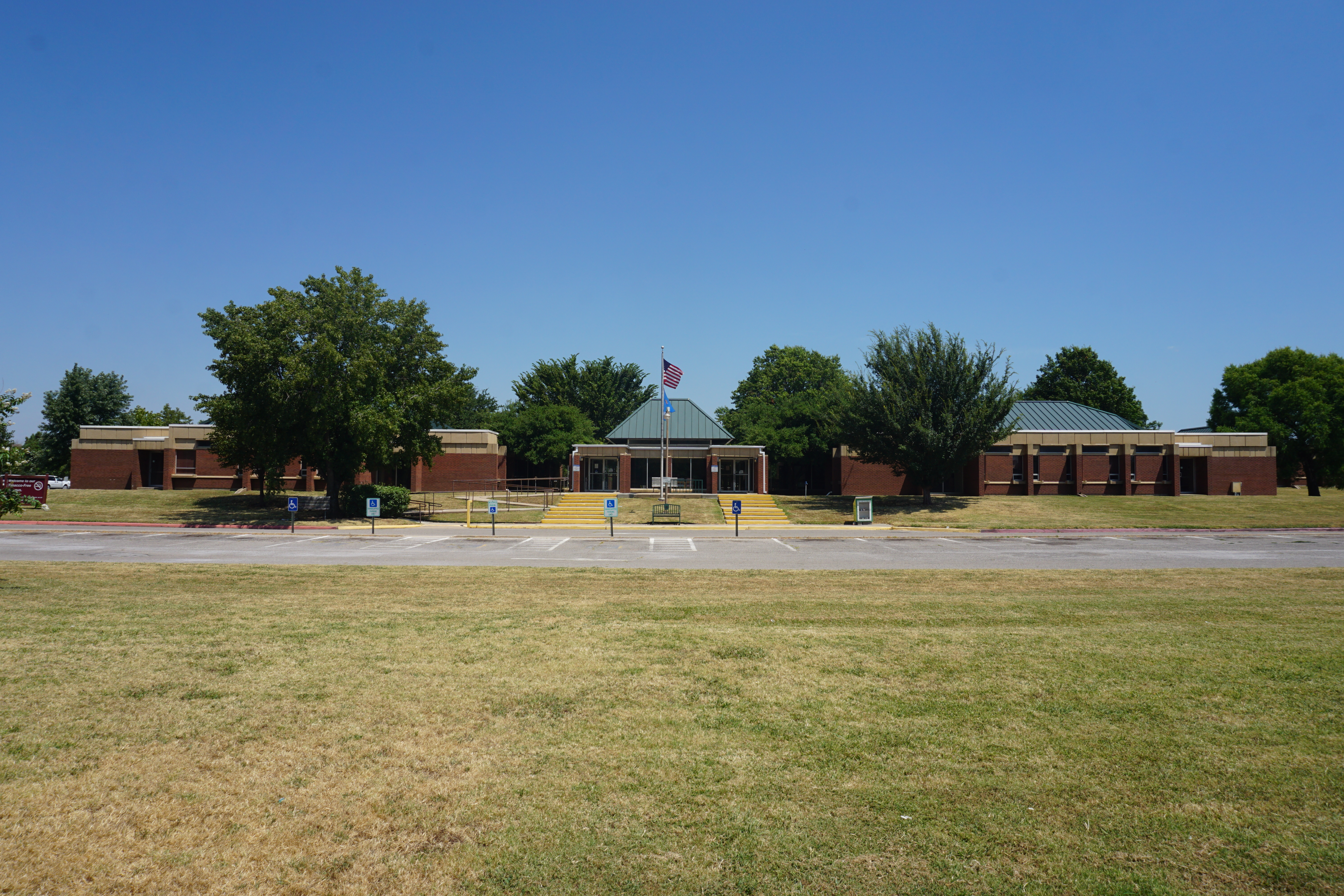
The Central Oklahoma Community Mental Health Center in Norman

State operated facilities include:

- Carl Albert Community Mental Health Center
- Central Oklahoma Community Mental Health Center
- Children's Recovery Center
- Griffin Memorial Hospital
- Jim Taliaferro Community Mental Health Center
- Northwest Center for Behavioral Health
- Oklahoma Country Crisis Center
- Oklahoma County Recovery Unit
- Oklahoma Forensic Center
- Tulsa Center for Behavioral Health

== Budget and Staffing ==
The department is the sixth largest state agency by annual appropriations from the Oklahoma Legislature. For fiscal year 2025, the department received a total of $387 million in initial appropriations. Appropriations make up 64% of the FY25 ODMHSAS budget, 25% or $152 million is from fees for service, and 11% or $68 million is grant revenue primarily from the federal Substance Abuse and Mental Health Services Administration.

All fiscal decisions are made based on two key criteria: alignment with the mission of ODMHSAS and the availability of funding. As a state agency partially funded by taxpayer dollars, ODMHSAS is committed to transparency in the use of public funds. Every expenditure must clearly support the department’s mission and reflect responsible stewardship of financial resources.

The department, with an annual budget of over $600 million, is one of the largest employers in the State. For fiscal year 2026, the department was authorized 1,971 full-time employees. ODMHSAS oversees 5 Inpatient Psychiatric Hospitals, 4 Certified Community Behavioral Health Clinics, and 2 Crisis Stabilization Units.

| Division | Number of Employees |
|---|---|
| Central Administration | 283 |
| Inpatient/Crisis | 1083 |
| Outpatient | 605 |
| Total | 1,971 |

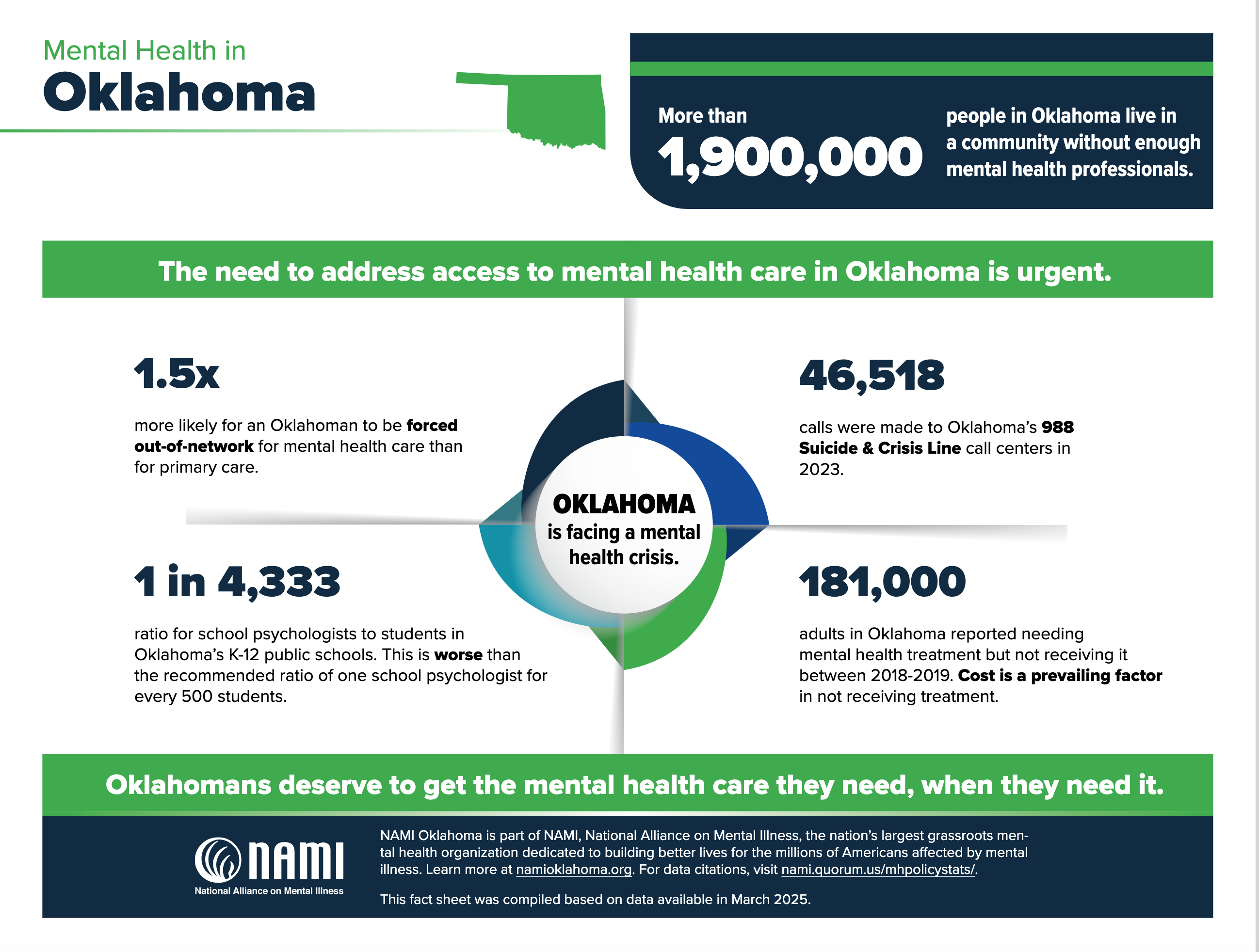
Updated OK Mental Health spending

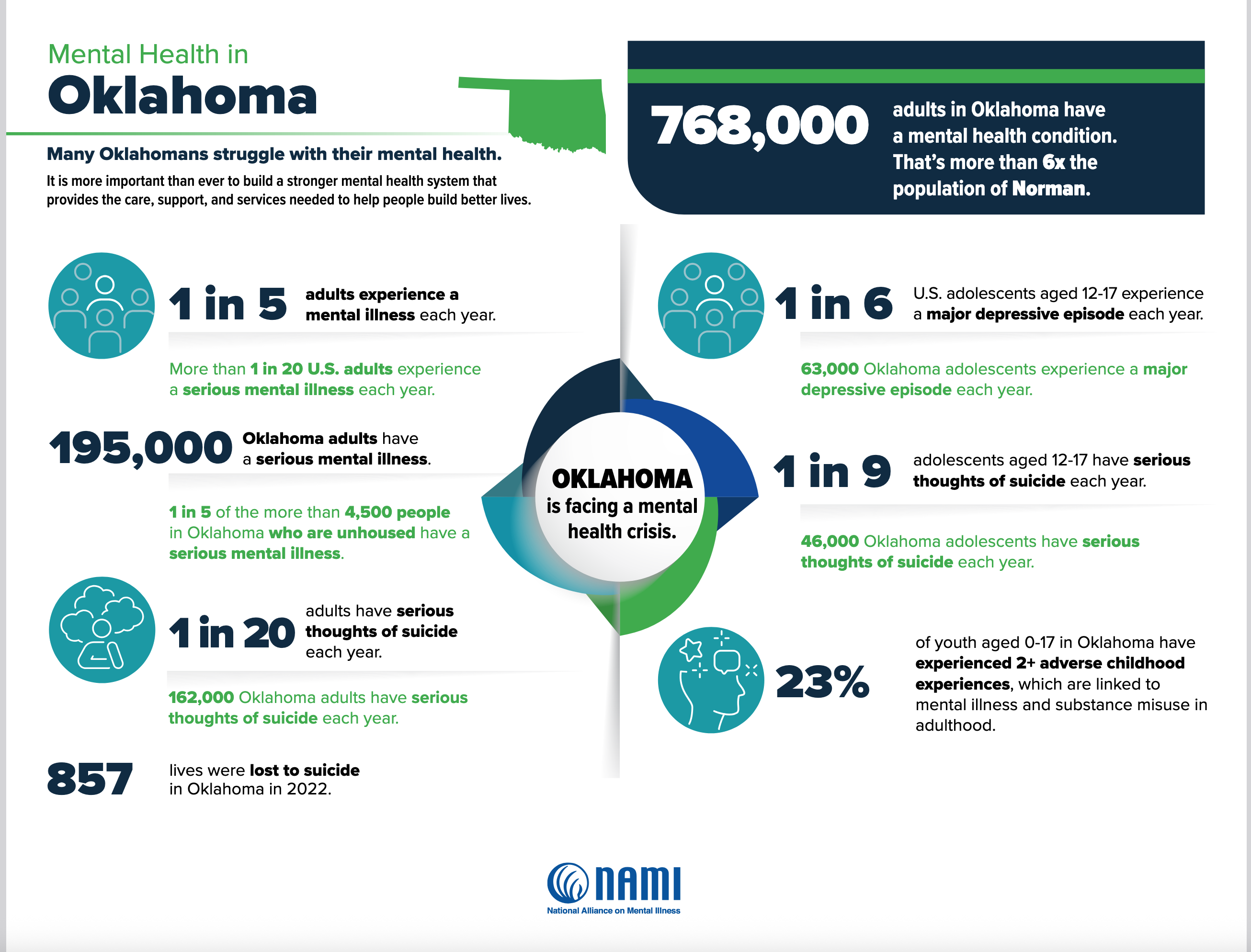
Updated OK Mental Health spending

Oklahoma consistently ranks as one of the top states for the number of individuals with mental illness and addiction,[3] but as one of the bottom states as far as behavioral health funding.[4] For example, while the national average of spending per individual for mental health treatment is $120.56, Oklahoma only spends $53.05. Oklahoma has critical funding setbacks in 2024-25, when the Oklahoma Department of Mental Health and Substance Abuse Services announced in a legislative document it had reviewed 573 mental health contracts and only 128 of the agreements would be renewed, and another 122 contracts faced reduced funding. A crisis of providing mental health services is expected to burden agencies already hurt by budget cuts.

== See also ==
- Oklahoma State Department of Health
- Oklahoma Department of Human Services
- Oklahoma Department of Rehabilitation Services
- Oklahoma Bureau of Narcotics and Dangerous Drugs Control
