= Oklahoma Department of Human Services =

Oklahoma Human Services
Agency overview
- Formed: 1936
- Headquarters: Sequoyah Building 2400 N Lincoln Boulevard Oklahoma City, Oklahoma
- Employees: 6,217 (FY23)
- Annual budget: $5.1 billion (FY23)
- Minister responsible: Dr. Deborah Shropshire, Secretary of Health and Human Services
- Agency executive: Dr. Deborah Shropshire, Executive Director
- Website: Oklahoma Human Services

The Oklahoma Department of Human Services is an agency of the government of Oklahoma. Under the supervision of the Oklahoma Secretary of Health and Human Services, Oklahoma Human Services is responsible for providing help to individuals and families in need through public assistance programs and managing services for seniors and people with disabilities.

The department is led by the Director of Human Services, who is appointed by the Governor of Oklahoma, with the consent of the Oklahoma Senate, to serve at the pleasure of the governor. The current director is Dr. Deborah Shropshire, who was appointed by Governor Kevin Stitt on January 10, 2023.

The department was established in 1936 during the term of Governor of Oklahoma E. W. Marland.

== History ==
The state agency was established in 1936 by the voters of Oklahoma by an amendment to the Oklahoma Constitution. By a two-to-one margin, voters approved Article XXV, a state constitutional amendment, “to provide … for the relief and care of needy aged … and other needy persons.“ The department was established under the name of the Department of Public Welfare. The agency began with the four divisions of finance, statistical, child welfare, and public assistance.

In 1951, Lloyd E. Rader was appointed director of the agency, and he turned the then poorly functioning agency into a model for other states. During the 1950s, the agency's responsibilities were expanded as other agencies were transferred under Rader's leadership. Rader would serve as the agency's director until his resignation in 1982.

Lawmakers changed the agency's name to the Department of Institutions, Social and Rehabilitative Services in 1968 legislation. In 1980, the Oklahoma Legislature changed the name to the Department of Human Services. Under Rader's leadership, the agency gained a large budget with the addition of federal funding. By 1966, the agency budget was $235 million. By 1970, it paid out more in welfare than any of its neighboring states.

In November 2012, Oklahoma voters amended the Oklahoma Constitution by passing State Question 756, which reorganized the agency. Prior to the amendment, the Department of Human Services was governed by a nine-member Commission on Human Services, whose members were appointed by the Governor of Oklahoma to serve fixed terms. The commission would then appoint a director under the commission's oversight. The 2012 amendment abolished the commission and provided for the appointment of the director by the governor directly.

== Scope and goals ==
The Department of Human Services provides a number of assistance programs to help Oklahomans by administering federal programs for food benefits and Temporary Assistance for Needy Families; and the state's child welfare, developmental disabilities, aging, adult protective, and child support systems; and child care assistance, licensing and monitoring. The agency also handles applications and eligibility for ABD Sooner Care, the state's Medicaid program offering health care to aged, blind, or disabled individuals with low incomes.

== Organization ==
The growth of the Department of Human Services has created a complex organization that includes agency leaders, division directors and county offices in each of Oklahoma's 77 counties.

=== Leadership ===
The state agency is led by the Oklahoma Secretary of Health and Human Services and day-to-day operations are administered by an agency director. Under Governor of Oklahoma Kevin Stitt, the secretary is Dr. Deborah Shropshire, and Dr. Deborah Shropshire is also serving as agency director.

=== Structure ===
As of January 2023, the organization of the department is as follows:

- Oklahoma Secretary of Human Services
  - Director
    - Agency Deputy Director
      - Financial Resources
      - Human Resources
      - Support Services
      - Strategic Engagement
      - Innovation Services
      - Communications
      - Office of Civil Rights
      - Office of the General Counsel
      - Office of Project Management
      - Technology Business Management
    - Adult and Family Services
      - Child Care Subsidy
      - Food Distribution
      - Low-Income Home Energy Assistance Program
      - State Supplementation Program
      - SoonerCare
      - Supplemental Nutrition Assistance Program
      - Temporary Assistance to Needy Families
    - Child Care Services
    - Child Support Services
    - Child Welfare Services
      - Family Centered Services
      - Child Protective Services
      - Foster Care Services
      - Adoption Services
    - Community Living Services
      - ADvantage Services
      - Adult Protective Services
    - Developmental Disability Services
    - Office of the Inspector General
    - Office of Client Advocacy

== Budget and staffing ==
Expenditures made by Oklahoma Human Services are divided into two major areas: an annual operating budget used to run the department and funded primarily by state appropriations and a Medical and Assistance Fund used to fund the assistance programs. The agency receives both federal and state funding and has additional sources of revenue. The agency received a state appropriation of $753 million and had a total budget of $5.1 billion for fiscal year 2023. More than 15 percent of Oklahoma households are" food insecure," i.e., limited access to adequate nutrition., and Oklahoma has the fifth-highest rate of food insecurity in the nation, surpassing the national average rate of 13.5 percent. Despite a growing number of residents depending on Food Assistance programs, in 2025 Oklahoma will receive a nearly 40 percent cut in SNAP funding.

The Department of Human Services is the largest employer in Oklahoma state government. As of October 2023, the agency has a total staff of 6,217.

== See also ==
- Oklahoma Health Care Authority
- Government of Oklahoma
- Kelsey Smith-Briggs Child Protection Reform Act
- "Throwaway Kids", a two-part investigative report on the OKDHS that aired on the ABC News magazine 20/20 in 1981
