= Oklahoma Department of Rehabilitation Services =

- Great Seal of Oklahoma

Agency overview
- Formed: July 1, 1993
- Headquarters: 3535 NW 58 Street, Suite 500; Oklahoma City, Oklahoma
- Employees: 986 (FY16)
- Annual budget: $148.8 million (FY16)
- Ministers responsible: Oklahoma Secretary of Health and Human Services; Wes Hilliard, Chair of the Commission
- Agency executive: Melinda Fruendt, Executive Director
- Parent agency: Commission for Rehabilitation Services
- Website: www.okdrs.gov

The Oklahoma Department of Rehabilitation Services (DRS) is an agency of the government of the US state, responsible for providing people with physical, mental and visual disabilities with the opportunity to obtain employment and independent living through counseling, job training and other individualized services. DRS helps bridge barriers to success in the workplace, school and at home. DRS has five program divisions, Vocational Rehabilitation, Visual Services, Disability Determination, Oklahoma School for the Blind and Oklahoma School for the Deaf. These divisions operate dozens of specialized programs that help Oklahomans lead more independent and productive lives.

DRS is governed by the Commission for Rehabilitation Services, composed of three members appointed by the governor of Oklahoma, the president pro tempore of the Oklahoma Senate, and the speaker of the Oklahoma House of Representatives. The commission, in turn, appoints the director of rehabilitation services to serve as the chief executive officer of the department.

The current director of rehabilitation services is Melinda Fruendt, who was appointed by the commission on November 5, 2018.

The department was established in 1993 during the term of Governor David Walters

== Leadership ==
The department is led by the Oklahoma State Cabinet Secretary of Health and Human Services under Governor of Oklahoma Kevin Stitt.

=== Commission for Rehabilitation Services ===
The Commission for Rehabilitation Services is the governing board of the department. The Commission is composed of three members, with one member appointed by the governor of Oklahoma, one member appointed by the president pro tempore of the Oklahoma Senate, and one member appointed by the speaker of the Oklahoma House of Representatives. All members of the Commission serve three-year terms. For more information about each commissioner, visit the website.

== Program divisions ==
- Disability Determination Services - determines medical eligibility for Social Security Disability Insurance and Supplemental Security Income
- Vocational Rehabilitation - employment services for people with any disability, except blindness
- Services for the Blind and Visually Impaired - employment and independent living services for people who are blind or visually impaired; also includes the Oklahoma Library for the Blind and Physically Handicapped and the Business Enterprise Program legislated by the Randolph Sheppard Act.
- Oklahoma School for the Blind - provides educational programs for children who are blind or visually impaired
- Oklahoma School for the Deaf - provides educational programs for children who are deaf or hard of hearing

== Staffing ==
The Department of Rehabilitation Services has an annual budget of nearly $150 million and approximately 986 full-time employees.

Division	Number of Employees
Rehab and Visual Services	374
School for the Blind	90
School for the Deaf	120
Disability Determination	329
Support Services	73
Total	986
