= Oklahoma State Department of Health =

Agency overview
- Formed: November 17, 1907
- Preceding agency: Territorial Board of Health
- Headquarters: Oklahoma Commons; 123 Robert S. Kerr Avenue Oklahoma City, Oklahoma
- Employees: 1,552 (FY19)
- Annual budget: $393 million (FY19)
- Minister responsible: Kevin Corbett, Secretary of Health
- Agency executive: Keith Reid, Commissioner of Health
- Website: ok.gov/health

The Oklahoma State Department of Health (OSDH) is a department of the government of Oklahoma under the supervision of the Oklahoma Secretary of Health. The department is responsible for protecting the health of all Oklahomans and providing other essential human services. The OSDH serves as the primary public health protection agency in the state.

The department is led the State Commissioner of Health, who is appointed by the governor of Oklahoma with the approval of the Oklahoma Senate to serve at the pleasure of the Governor. The Commissioner is the executive officer of the department and is the lead public health authority in the state. To assist the Commissioner is the State Board of Health, composed of nine members appointed by the governor of Oklahoma with the approval of the Oklahoma Senate, which serves as advisory board to the Commissioner.

== History ==
In 1920, governor James B. A. Robertson appointed Sallie Lewis Stephens Sturgeon as a public health inspector for the Oklahoma State Health Department, making her the first woman in the United States to hold such a position.

== Leadership ==
The department is led by the Secretary of Health and the Commissioner of Health. Oklahoma law requires the Commissioner of Health to have professional expertise as any of the following: 1) an actively licensed physician (MD/DO), 2) a doctoral-level degree holder in public health or public health administration, 3) a masters' degree holder with a minimum of five years experience in administering health services.

As of January 2022, under Governor of Oklahoma Kevin Stitt, Kevin Corbett serves as Cabinet Secretary (and CEO of the Oklahoma Health Care Authority) and Keith Reid, RN serves as the Interim Commissioner of Health. Reid succeeded Colonel Lance Frye, MD who also served under Governor Kevin Stitt from May 2020 until his resignation on October 25, 2021. OSDH's central office in Oklahoma City provides administrative oversight for the state's system of county health departments, which are overseen by regional administrators reporting to the State Commissioner.

== State Board of Health ==
The State Board of Health is the governing body of the Health Department. The Board is composed of nine members appointed by the Governor of Oklahoma with the approval of the Oklahoma Senate. Each Board member serves a nine-year term. Eight of the nine members represent specific county regions of the state and one member is appointed to represent the state at large.

Current members at any time are listed on the Board's Web site. As of January 2022 the Board was composed of the following members:

Name	Region	Board position
Jeffrey James Lim, M.D.	Cimarron, Texas, Beaver, Harper, Woodward, Woods, Major, Alfalfa, Grant, Garfield, Kay and Noble	President
Bruce L. Storms, M.D.	Blaine, Kingfisher, Canadian, Caddo, Grady, Comanche, Jefferson, Stephens and Cotton	Vice President
Randy Grellner, D.O.	At-large	Secretary
Jenny Alexopulos, D.O.	Ottawa, Delaware, Craig, Mayes, Nowata, Rogers, Washington, Tulsa, Pawnee, and Osage	
Kinon E. Whittington, D.O.	LeFlore, Latimer, Pittsburg, Atoka, Pushmataha, McCurtain, Choctaw, Bryan, Marshall, Carter, and Love	
Charles W. Grim, D.D.S., M.H.S.A	Adair, Sequoyah, Cherokee, Wagoner, Muskogee, Haskell, McIntosh, and Okmulgee	
R. Murali Krishna, M.D.	Logan, Oklahoma, Cleveland, McClain, Garvin, Murray and Payne	
Ronald D. Osterhout, M.S.	Ellis, Dewey, Custer, Roger Mills, Beckham, Washita, Kiowa, Greer, Jackson, Harmon, and Tillman	
Travis Wolff, PharmD	Creek, Lincoln, Okfuskee, Seminole, Pottawatomie, Pontotoc, Hughes, Johnston and Coal	

== Organization ==
As of January 2023, the organization of the department is as follows:

- Oklahoma Secretary of Health
  - Commissioner of Health
    - Community Health Services
      - Personal Health Services
        - Chronic Disease Services
        - Community Development Services
        - Immunization Services
        - Injury Prevention Services
      - Family Health Services
        - Dental Health Services
        - Family Support and Prevention Services
        - Maternal and Child Health Services
        - Screening and Special Services
        - SoonerStart Services
        - Women, Infants, and Children Services
      - County Health Departments
      - Nursing Services
      - Community Health Records
    - Quality Assurance and Regulatory Services
      - Long Term Care Services
      - Medical Facilities Services
      - Health Resource Development Services
      - Consumer Health Services
    - Health Preparedness Services
      - Public Health Laboratory
      - Emergency Preparedness and Response Services
      - Chief Science Officer
      - State Epidemiologist
      - Acute Disease Services
      - Sexual Health and Harm Reduction Services
      - Center for Health Statistics
      - Vital Records
    - Chief Administrative Officer
      - Support Services
      - General Counsel
      - Policy and Rulemaking
      - Human Resources
      - Enterprise Systems Services
    - Chief Financial Officer
      - Revenue and Accounts Payable
      - Procurement
      - Payroll and Travel
      - Financial Planning and Analysis
      - Grant Management
      - Grant Accounting
      - Operations Excellence
    - Chief Strategy and Business Performance Officer
      - Strategy and Transformation
      - Chief Technology Officer
      - Project Management Office
    - Chief of Staff
      - Communications
      - Legislative Liaison
    - Chief Medical Officer
  - State Board of Health
  - Office of Accountability Systems
  - Internal Audit

== Management and finance ==
=== Staffing ===
The Health Department, with an annual budget of well over $300 million, is one of the largest employers of the State. For fiscal year 2014, the department was authorized 2,148 full-time employees.

Division	Number of Employees
Public Health Infrastructure	163
Protective Health Services	270
Prevention and Preparedness	211
Health Improvement Services	130
Community and Family Health	1374
Total	2,148

=== Budget ===
The divisions of the department operation with the following operating budgets for Fiscal Year 2019:

Program	Funding (in millions)
Public Health Infrastructure	$28.8
Oklahoma Medical Marijuana Authority	$10.2
Prevention and Preparedness	$61.6
Protective Health Services	$62.6
Community and Family Health Services	$179.3
Health Improvement	$21.5
Data Processing and Public Policy	$32.9
Total	$392.5

== Supporting agencies ==
- Alarm Industry Committee
- State Barber Advisory Board
- Breast Cancer Prevention and Treatment Advisory Committee
- Office of Child Abuse Prevention
- Interagency Child Abuse Prevention Task Force
- Child Abuse Training & Coordination Council
- Childhood Lead Poisoning Prevention Advisory Council
- Licensed Professional Counselors Advisory Board
- Dental Health Service
- Driver's License Medical Advisory Committee
- Emergency Response Systems Development Advisory Council
- Health Care Information Advisory Committee
- Hearing Aid Advisory Council
- Home Health Advisory Board
- Hospice Advisory Council
- Long-Term Care Facility Advisory Board
- Licensed Marital & Family Therapists Advisory Board
- Medical Audit Committee
- Organ Donor Education & Awareness Program Advisory Council
- Interagency Council on Osteoporosis
- Radiation Advisory Committee
- Residents and Family State Council
- Sanitarian & Environmental Specialist Registration Advisory Council
- Vision Screening Standards Advisory Committee
