= 2006 Oklahoma state budget =

2006 Budget of the Oklahoma state government
- Submitted by: Brad Henry
- Submitted to: 50th Legislature
- Country: Oklahoma
- Total revenue: $5.965 billion
- Total expenditures: $5.951 billion
- Website: http://www.ok.gov/osf/Budget/index.html Oklahoma Office of State Finance

The Oklahoma State Budget for Fiscal Year 2006 was a spending request by Governor Brad Henry to fund government operations for July 1, 2005–June 30, 2006. Governor Henry and legislative leader approved the budget in May 2005.

Figures shown in the spending request do not reflect the actual appropriations for Fiscal Year 2006, which must be authorized by the Legislature.

== Major initiatives ==
The Governor's budget identified the following major initiatives:

- Education - day long kindergarten programs statewide, pilot program for middle school math improvement program, reforming high school curriculum, and a bond issue for higher education building projects
- Health Care - reducing the price of prescription drugs
- Tax Reform - establish an Economic Development Research Endowment Fund, established a Taxpayer Relief Fund, exemption of Corporate capital gains from taxation and estate tax reform

== Key funding issues ==
The Governor's budget identified the following key funding issues:

- Health Care
  - $80 million for Oklahoma Health Care Authority to maintain program levels
  - $1.4 million for State prescription drug program
  - $11.8 million for Oklahoma Department of Mental Health and Substance Abuse Services programs
  - $3.8 million to improve nursing home inspections, increase nurse salaries and improve breast cancer screening program
  - $1.8 million to improve the nurse-to-patient ratio at Oklahoma Department of Veterans Affairs centers
- Education
  - $22.4 million to provide 100% of teachers' health insurance
  - $54.8 million to increase teachers' salaries
  - $24.6 million to provide full-day kindergarten programs statewide
  - $18.3 million for academic programs
  - $62.7 million for higher education bond issue, institutional allocations and scholarships
  - $4.2 million for Oklahoma Department of Career and Technology Education for rural and urban programs, inmate skill centers and business industry training
- Public Safety
  - $14.2 million to annualize supplemental appropriations
  - $3.4 million to authorize a 72-member academy for the Oklahoma Highway Patrol
- Transportation
  - $48.6 million increase to pay off debt by Oklahoma Department of Transportation
- Human Services
  - $72.1 million for Oklahoma Department of Human Services to replace one-time revenue sources to support child care subsidies
  - $2.8 million for Oklahoma Office of Juvenile Affairs to increase juvenile tracking and expanding mental health and substance abuse services
- Commerce, Tourism, Energy, Environment
  - $2 million to Tar Creek Trust Authority for voluntary relocation plan
  - $2.4 million to Oklahoma Historical Society for debt payments
  - $1 million to Oklahoma Department of Commerce to improve business recruitment
- Capital Budget - issuing a $145 million bond to provide for the maintenance, replacement or construction of the following:
  - $27 million to replace heating and cooling system in Oklahoma State Capitol building
  - $26 million to construct new headquarters for Oklahoma Tax Commission
  - $25 million to construct a State Data Center to provide information technology services to all State agencies
  - $3 million to increase the budget for the construction of a new office for the Attorney General of Oklahoma
  - $21 million for the remodel and expansion of the Wiley Post Historical Building into the new State Judicial Center as home for the Oklahoma Supreme Court
  - $7 million to construct a new medium security facility for the Oklahoma Office of Juvenile Affairs
  - $25 million for the Oklahoma Water Resources Board to use a loans to local government to improve local water systems
  - $5 million for the Oklahoma City Bombing Memorial as an endowment
  - $6 million to repair or purchase two correctional facilities under the Oklahoma Department of Corrections

== Total revenue ==
Tax revenue for Fiscal Year 2006 was $5.75 billion, up 11% from FY2005 levels of $5.2 billion. All revenue of the fiscal year 2006 was $5.96 billion, up 8.2% from FY2005 levels of $5.5 billion. The breakdown is as follows:

- $5.75 billion - All Taxes
  - $2.01 billion - Individual Income Tax
  - $1.44 billion - Sales and Use Tax
  - $633 million - Gross Production Tax
  - $460 million - Motor Vehicle Tax
  - $403 million - Motor Fuels Tax
  - $173 million - Corporate Income Tax
  - $173 million - Cigarette Tax
  - $460 million - All Other Taxes
- $203 million - Revenue Increases
- $3 million - Other Revenue

The Governor's budget called for $13 million in tax cuts, including the follows:

- $4.6 million in decreased income taxes for the retired
- $4.2 million in Back to School tax holiday
- $2.1 million in Workers' Compensation reform
- $1.8 million in capital gains tax exemption for corporations

== Total spending ==
=== Governor's request ===
The Governor's budget for Fiscal Year 2006 totaled $5.95 billion in spending, a 9.2% increase over Fiscal Year 2005 levels of $5.5 billion. Percentages in parentheses indicate percentage change compared to 2005 budget. The budget request is broken down by the following expenditures:

- $93 million - Fiscal Year 2005 Supplementals
- $47.7 million - Pay Increases for State employees

- Appropriations by Cabinet Department: 5.86 billion (+8%)
  - $3.15 billion - Education (+6%)
  - $794 million - Health (+14%)
  - $664 million - Human Services (+15%)
  - $561 million - Safety and Security (+7%)
  - $258 million - Transportation (+28%)
  - $104 million - Finance and Revenue (+6%)
  - $70.6 million - Commerce and Tourism (-3%)
  - $66.2 million - Judiciary (+5%)
  - $34.9 million - Veterans Affairs (+15%)
  - $33.9 million - Legislature (+2%)
  - $32.4 million - Agriculture (+2%)
  - $21.7 million - Science and Technology (+86%)
  - $20.6 million - Human Resources and Administration (+4%)
  - $16 million - Environment (-1%)
  - $13.3 million - Energy (+6%)
  - $10.6 million - Military (+32%)
  - $7.7 million - Secretary of State (-7%)
  - $3.1 million - Governor and Lieutenant Governor (+2.5%)
- Appropriations by agency: $5.86 billion (+8%)
  - $2.13 billion - Department of Education
  - $865 million - State Regents for Higher Education
  - $564 million - Health Care Authority
  - $489 million - Department of Human Services
  - $406 million - Department of Corrections
  - $258 million - Department of Transportation
  - $170 million - Department of Mental Health and Substance Abuse Services
  - $128 million - Department of Career and Technology Education
  - $100 million - Office of Juvenile Affairs
  - $72.4 million - Department of Public Safety
  - $66.2 million - Judiciary
  - $59.2 million - Department of Health
  - $45.2 million - Tax Commission
  - $34.9 million - Department of Veterans Affairs
  - $33.9 million - Legislature
  - $30 million - District Attorneys Council
  - $30 million - Department of Commerce
  - $26.4 million - Department of Rehabilitation Services
  - $24.9 million - Department of Agriculture
  - $24.8 million - Office of State Finance
  - $24.6 million - Department of Tourism and Recreation
  - $279.5 million - All Other Agencies

=== Actual appropriations ===
The Legislature approved a total of $6.2 billion in spending for Fiscal Year 2006, an 11% increase over Fiscal Year 2005 levels of $5.5 billion. Percentages in parentheses indicate percentage change compared to 2005 actual appropriations:

- $101 million - Fiscal Year 2005 Supplementals

- Appropriations by Cabinet Department: $6.1 billion (+11%)
  - $3.2 billion - Education
  - $869 million - Health
  - $665 million - Human Services
  - $614 million - Safety and Security
  - $276 million - Transportation
  - $140 million - Finance and Revenue
  - $89.9 million - Commerce and Tourism
  - $74.4 million - Judiciary
  - $42.5 million - Agriculture
  - $36.0 million - Veterans Affairs
  - $34.2 million - Legislature
  - $20.5 million - Human Resources and Administration
  - $15.3 million - Environment
  - $13.2 million - Energy
  - $12.5 million - Military
  - $12.4 million - Science and Technology
  - $7.9 million - Secretary of State
  - $3.1 million - Governor and Lieutenant Governor
- Appropriations by agency: $6.1 billion (+11%)
  - $2.50 billion - Department of Education
  - $889 million - State Regents for Higher Education
  - $572 million - Health Care Authority
  - $482 million - Department of Human Services
  - $409 million - Department of Corrections
  - $276 million - Department of Transportation
  - $172 million - Department of Mental Health and Substance Abuse Services
  - $130 million - Department of Career and Technology Education
  - $98.3 million - Office of Juvenile Affairs
  - $78.9 million - Department of Public Safety
  - $69.2 million - Judiciary
  - $61.8 million - Department of Health
  - $45.6 million - Tax Commission
  - $36.0 million - Department of Veterans Affairs
  - $33.4 million - Legislature
  - $30.6 million - District Attorneys Council
  - $27.4 million - Department of Rehabilitation Services
  - $26.3 million - Department of Commerce
  - $26.3 million - Department of Agriculture
  - $26.0 million - Department of Tourism and Recreation
  - $22.8 million - Office of State Finance
  - $127.4 million - All Other Agencies
