= 2005 Oklahoma state budget =

2004 Budget of the Oklahoma state government
- Submitted by: Brad Henry
- Submitted to: 49th Legislature
- Total revenue: $5.50 billion
- Total expenditures: $5.49 billion
- Website: http://www.ok.gov/osf/Budget/index.html Oklahoma Office of State Finance

The Oklahoma State Budget for Fiscal Year 2005, was a spending request by Governor Brad Henry to fund government operations for July 1, 2004–June 30, 2005. Governor Henry and legislative leader approved the budget in May 2004.

Figures shown in the spending request do not reflect the actual appropriations for Fiscal Year 2005, which must be authorized by the Legislature.

== Overview ==
Fiscal Year 2004 saw revenue increase for the first time since FY2002. FY2005 represented the first budget year following a four-year recession

== Major initiatives ==
The Governor's budget identified the following three major objectives:

- Education – increase teacher salaries to the regional average over a five-year period
- Health Care – expand health insurance to the uninsured poor, decreased youth tobacco usage, increase funding for trauma care and establish a Cancer Research Center
- Economic Growth – exempt capital gains from individual income taxes, reduce taxes on the retired and permanently reduce individual income tax rate from 7% to 6.65%

== Key funding issues ==
The Governor's budget identified the following key funding issues:

- Health Care - $201 million increase, including:
  - $100 million for expanded health insurance for uninsured poor
  - $7 million for cancer research center
  - $8.9 million for trauma care
  - $3 million for youth tobacco prevention and cessation programs
- Education - $114.3 million increase, including:
  - $62.4 million for provide 100% of public teachers' health insurance premiums
  - $27 million for higher education scholarships
- Public Safety - $6 million increase, including:
  - $6 million for Oklahoma Department of Corrections to annualize supplemental appropriation
  - Authorize a 72-member cadet academy for the Oklahoma Highway Patrol
- Transportation - $6.2 million increase to the Oklahoma Department of Transportation for debt payments
- Human Services - $17.6 million increase, including:
  - $15 million to Oklahoma Department of Human Services' Child Care program
  - $2 million Oklahoma Department of Human Services to prepare young children for school
  - $570,000 to Oklahoma Office of Juvenile Affairs to replace one-time revenue
- Commerce, Tourism, Energy, Environment - $7.5 million increase:
  - $5 million to Tar Creek Trust Authority for voluntary relocation plan
  - $1.3 million to Oklahoma Historical Society for debt services
  - $1.2 million to Oklahoma Department of Commerce for new manufacturing program

== Total revenue ==
Tax revenue for Fiscal Year 2005 was $5.2 billion, up 4.9% from FY2004 levels of $4.9 billion. All revenue of the fiscal year 2005 was $5.5 billion, up 7.4% from FY2004 levels of $5.16 billion. The breakdown is as follows:

- $5.148 billion - All Taxes
  - $1.97 billion - Individual Income Tax
  - $1.33 billion - Sales Tax
  - $361 million - Gross Production Tax
  - $217 million - Motor Vehicle Tax
  - $101 million - Corporate Income Tax
  - $1.17 billion - All Other Taxes
- $356 million - Revenue Increases

== Total spending ==
The Governor's budget for Fiscal Year 2005 totaled $5.49 billion in spending. Percentages in parentheses indicate percentage change compared to 2004. The budget request is broken down by the following expenditures:

- Appropriations by Cabinet Department: 5.49 billion (+6.7%)
  - $2.97 billion - Education (+4%)
  - $839 million - Health (+32%)
  - $568 million - Human Services (+4%)
  - $516 million - Safety and Security (+1%)
  - $199 million - Transportation (+3%)
  - $82.4 million - Finance and Revenue (+2%)
  - $67.3 million - Commerce and Tourism (+5%)
  - $63.2 million - Judiciary (+7%)
  - $31.6 million - Legislature (+0%)
  - $29.2 million - Veterans Affairs (+8%)
  - $28.2 million - Agriculture (-1%)
  - $19.3 million - Human Resources and Administration (-7%)
  - $17.2 million - Environment (+41%)
  - $11.7 million - Science and Technology (+6%)
  - $8.7 million - Energy (+0%)
  - $7.9 million - Secretary of State (-15%)
  - $7.8 million - Military (+11%)
  - $3.0 million - Governor and Lieutenant Governor (+0%)
- Appropriations by agency: $5.49 billion (+6.7%)
  - $2.0 billion - Department of Education
  - $796 million - State Regents for Higher Education
  - $482 million - Health Care Authority
  - $404 million - Department of Human Services
  - $380 million - Department of Corrections
  - $198 million - Department of Transportation
  - $151 million - Department of Mental Health and Substance Abuse Services
  - $117 million - Department of Career and Technology Education
  - $90.5 million - Office of Juvenile Affairs
  - $63.1 million - Judiciary
  - $62.5 million - Department of Public Safety
  - $56.5 million - Department of Health
  - $44.4 million - Tax Commission
  - $31.6 million - Legislature
  - $29.2 million - Department of Veterans Affairs
  - $26 million - District Attorneys Council
  - $25 million - Department of Rehabilitation Services
  - $22.9 million - Department of Tourism and Recreation
  - $22.8 million - Department of Commerce
  - $22.4 million - Office of State Finance
  - $22.3 million - Department of Agriculture
  - $404 million - All Other Agencies
