= 2001 Oklahoma state budget =

2001 Budget of the Oklahoma state government
- Submitted by: Frank Keating
- Submitted to: 47th Legislature
- Total revenue: $5.4 billion
- Total expenditures: $5.4 billion
- Website: http://www.ok.gov/osf/Budget/index.html Oklahoma Office of State Finance

The Oklahoma State Budget for Fiscal Year 2001, was the spending request by Governor Frank Keating to fund government operations for July 1, 2000–June 30, 2001. Governor Keating and legislative leader approved the budget in May 2000. This was Governor Keating's sixth budget submitted as governor.

Figures shown in the spending request do not reflect the actual appropriations for Fiscal Year 2001, which must be authorized by the Legislature.

== Total Revenue ==
All revenue of the fiscal year 2001 totaled $5.4 billion.

== Total Spending ==
The Governor's budget for 2001 totaled $5.4 billion in spending. The budget request is broken down by the following expenditures:

- Appropriations by Cabinet Department: 5.4 billion
  - $2.97 billion - Education
  - $1.24 billion - Health and Human Services
  - $541 million - Safety and Security
  - $311 million - Transportation
  - $78.7 million - Finance and Revenue
  - $74.9 million - Commerce and Tourism
  - $59.1 million - Judiciary
  - $37.6 million - Agriculture
  - $33.9 million - Legislature
  - $25.4 million - Human Resources and Administration
  - $23.4 million - Veterans Affairs
  - $17.1 million - Environment
  - $12.2 million - Science and Technology
  - $8.8 million - Secretary of State
  - $8.6 million - Energy
  - $7.7 million - Military
  - $3.2 million - Governor and Lieutenant Governor
- Appropriations by agency: $5.4 billion
  - $1.98 billion - Department of Education
  - $833 million - State Regents for Higher Education
  - $391 million - Department of Human Services
  - $390 million - Department of Corrections
  - $384 million - Health Care Authority
  - $311 million - Department of Transportation
  - $138 million - Department of Mental Health and Substance Abuse Services
  - $129 million - Department of Career and Technology Education
  - $100 million - Office of Juvenile Affairs
  - $70 million - Department of Public Safety
  - $70 million - Department of Health
  - $59 million - Judiciary
  - $51 million - Tax Commission
  - $34 million - Legislature
  - $32 million - Department of Tourism and Recreation
  - $31 million - District Attorneys Council
  - $30 million - Department of Agriculture
  - $26 million - Department of Commerce
  - $25 million - Department of Rehabilitation Services
  - $23 million - Department of Veterans Affairs
  - $251 million - All Other Agencies
