= 2007 Oklahoma state budget =

2007 Budget of the Oklahoma state government
- Submitted by: Brad Henry
- Submitted to: 50th Legislature
- Total revenue: $6.65 billion
- Total expenditures: $6.64 billion
- Website: http://www.ok.gov/osf/Budget/index.html Oklahoma Office of State Finance

The Oklahoma State Budget for Fiscal Year 2007, was a spending request by Governor Brad Henry to fund government operations for July 1, 2006–June 30, 2007. Governor Henry and legislative leader approved the budget in May 2006.

Figures shown in the spending request do not reflect the actual appropriations for Fiscal Year 2007, which must be authorized by the Legislature.

== Major Initiatives ==
The Governor's budget identified the following major initiatives:

- Education - day long kindergarten programs statewide, pilot program for middle school math improvement program, reforming high school curriculum, and a bond issue for higher education building projects
- Health Care - reducing the price of prescription drugs
- Tax Reform - establish an Economic Development Research Endowment Fund, established a Taxpayer Relief Fund, exemption of Corporate capital gains from taxation and estate tax reform

== Key Funding Issues ==
The Governor's budget identified the following key funding issues:

- Agriculture - $16.5 million to Oklahoma Department of Agriculture as relief package for rural fire departments
- Commerce, Tourism, Energy, Environment
  - $1 million to the Oklahoma Department of Commerce for a market branding initiative
  - $500,000 is directed to the Native American Educational Authority for American Indian Cultural Center
  - $1.8 million to the Oklahoma Department of Environmental Quality to assist small communities statewide meet federal drinking water system regulations
  - $2.3 million to the Oklahoma Water Resources Board to update the States' comprehensive water plan
- Education
  - $156 million to Oklahoma State Department of Education for increased teacher salaries, state aid to local school districts, and other programs
  - $85.4 million to Oklahoma State Regents for Higher Education for institutional budget supplements, financial aid and scholarships for students
  - $14 million to Oklahoma Department of Career and Technology Education for comprehensive school and technology center programs, dropout recovery and expansion of business industry programs
- Health
  - $59 million for maintenance and annualizations in the Oklahoma Health Care Authority
  - $1.5 million for child abuse prevention programs
  - $13.6 million for programs in the Oklahoma Department of Mental Health and Substance Abuse Services
  - $4.7 million to increase nurses salaries across all agencies by an average of 10%
  - $1 million to Oklahoma Department of Veterans Affairs to improve the nurse-patient ratio at Veterans Centers
- Human Services
  - $28.1 million for Oklahoma Department of Human Services to increase salaries for child welfare workers and hire additional workers
  - $8.4 million to the Oklahoma Office of Juvenile Affairs to increase salaries for juvenile specialists and increased payments to county juvenile detention centers
  - $1.7 million for the Oklahoma Department of Rehabilitation Services for teacher salary increases, a deaf education satellite program and capital funds for the Oklahoma School for the Deaf and the Oklahoma School for the Blind
- Public Safety
  - $39 million for the Oklahoma Department of Corrections for salary increases and for additional payments to county jails
  - $1 million to expand law enforcement efforts on the fight against methamphetamine
  - $790,000 to expand law enforcement efforts to protect children from internet predators
- Transportation - $100 million to Oklahoma Department of Transportation for maintenance of roads and bridges, half to the State and half to the counties
- Capital Budget - issuing a $312.5 million bond to provide for the maintenance, replacement or construction of the following:
  - $9 million to the Oklahoma Department of Tourism and Recreation for environmental remediation and maintenance
  - $60 million to the Oklahoma Department of Public Safety for statewide Public Safety Communication System
  - $8.5 million to construct a residential and education facility for autistic children
  - $5 million to construct a new central Forensic Science Center for the Oklahoma State Bureau of Investigation in Edmond, Oklahoma
  - $25 million to establish a low-interest road improvement loan program for cities and counties
  - $25 million to Oklahoma Water Resources Board for Statewide Drinking Water Fund loan program for cities and counties
  - $180 million for "Invest for the Future of Oklahoma"

== Total Revenue ==
Tax revenue for Fiscal Year 2007 was $6.5 billion, up 13% from FY2006 levels of $5.75 billion. All revenue of the fiscal year 2007 was $6.65 billion, up 11.5% from FY2006 levels of $5.96 billion. The breakdown is as follows:

- $6.5 billion - All Taxes
- $163 million - Revenue Increases
- $3.5 million - Other Revenue

The Governor's budget called for $17.4 million in tax cuts, including the follows:

- $13.9 million in decreased income taxes for the retired
- $3.5 million in Back to School tax holiday

== Total Spending ==
The Governor's budget for Fiscal Year 2007 totaled $6.64 billion in spending, an increase of 12% over Fiscal Year 2006 levels of $5.95 billion. Percentages in parentheses indicate percentage change compared to 2006. The budget request is broken down by the following expenditures:

- $111 million - Fiscal Year 2006 Supplementals
- $29 million - Pay Increases for State employees

- Appropriations by Cabinet Department: 6.55 billion (+12%)
  - $3.47 billion - Education (+8%)
  - $961 million - Health (+9%)
  - $702 million - Human Services (+6%)
  - $648 million - Safety and Security (+12%)
  - $292 million - Transportation (+7%)
  - $106 million - Finance and Revenue (-24%)
  - $76.6 million - Judiciary (+9%)
  - $72.1 million - Commerce and Tourism (-20%)
  - $46.3 million - Agriculture (+7%)
  - $39.2 million - Veterans Affairs (+9%)
  - $35.5 million - Legislature (+4%)
  - $22.4 million - Science and Technology (+81%)
  - $21.4 million - Human Resources and Administration (+4%)
  - $16.4 million - Environment (+0%)
  - $13.5 million - Energy (+2%)
  - $12.8 million - Military (+2%)
  - $10.2 million - Secretary of State (+29%)
  - $3.2 million - Governor and Lieutenant Governor (+0%)
- Appropriations by agency: $6.5 billion (+12%)
  - $2.26 billion - Department of Education
  - $970 million - State Regents for Higher Education
  - $694 million - Health Care Authority
  - $514 million - Department of Human Services
  - $451 million - Department of Corrections
  - $291 million - Department of Transportation
  - $188 million - Department of Mental Health and Substance Abuse Services
  - $143 million - Department of Career and Technology Education
  - $105 million - Office of Juvenile Affairs
  - $84.6 million - Department of Public Safety
  - $76.6 million - Judiciary
  - $69.4 million - Department of Health
  - $48.8 million - Tax Commission
  - $39.2 million - Department of Veterans Affairs
  - $37.3 million - Department of Agriculture
  - $35.5 million - Legislature
  - $31.6 million - District Attorneys Council
  - $29.7 million - Department of Rehabilitation Services
  - $26.9 million - Department of Tourism and Recreation
  - $24.7 million - Department of Commerce
  - $23.2 million - Office of State Finance
  - $356.5 million - All Other Agencies

== Total Appropriations ==
The Oklahoma Legislature approved total appropriations for fiscal year 2007 of $6.56 billion. Percentages in parentheses indicate percentage change compared to the Governor's budget. The final appropriations are broken down by the following expenditures:

- Appropriations by Cabinet Department: $6.56 billion (+0%)
  - $3.46 billion - Education (+0%)
  - $967.9 million - Health (+1%)
  - $723.4 million - Human Services (+3%)
  - $651 million - Safety and Security (+0%)
  - $285.9 million - Transportation (-2%)
  - $105.2 million - Finance and Revenue (-1%)
  - $79.3 million - Judiciary (+4%)
  - $73 million - Commerce and Tourism (+1%)
  - $39.3 million - Veterans Affairs (+0%)
  - $37.3 million - Agriculture (-19%)
  - $35.7 million - Legislature (+1%)
  - $22.4 million - Human Resources and Administration (+5%)
  - $22.4 million - Science and Technology (+0%)
  - $17.3 million - Environment (+5%)
  - $15.1 million - Energy (+12%)
  - $12.9 million - Military (+1%)
  - $9 million - Secretary of State (-12%)
  - $3.2 million - Governor and Lieutenant Governor (+0%)
