= 2004 Oklahoma state budget =

2004 Budget of the Oklahoma state government
- Submitted by: Brad Henry
- Submitted to: 48th Legislature
- Total revenue: $5.16 billion
- Total expenditures: $5.16 billion
- Website: Oklahoma Office of State Finance

The Oklahoma State Budget for Fiscal Year 2004 was the spending request by Governor Brad Henry to fund government operations for July 1, 2003–June 30, 2004. Governor Henry and legislative leaders approved the budget in May 2003. This was Henry's first budget submitted as governor.

Figures shown in the spending request do not reflect the actual appropriations for fiscal year 2004, which must be authorized by the Legislature.

== Overview ==
Fiscal year 2003 saw a $593 million revenue shortfall. For FY2004, as in most budget years, the top eleven appropriated agencies made up 90% of the total budget. For FY2004, the governor and legislative leaders imposed a 6.3% across-the-board cut to state appropriations from 2003 levels. Education, healthcare, human services and public safety agencies saw only minor cuts or even slight increases. More dramatic budget cuts (ranging from 10% to 20%) were made to the agencies in the remaining 10% of the state budget.

== Total revenue ==
All revenue of the fiscal year 2004 was $5.16 billion, down 8.5% from FY2003. The breakdown is as follows:

- $4.935 billion - All Taxes
  - $1.99 billion - Individual Income Tax
  - $1.24 billion - Sales Tax
  - $359 million - Gross Production Tax
  - $214 million - Motor Vehicle Tax
  - $87.3 million - Corporate Income Tax
  - $1.05 billion - All Other Taxes
- $72 million - Rainy Day Fund
- $22 million - Other Sources
- $131 million - Revenue Adjustment

== Total spending ==
The Governor's budget for 2004 totaled $5.16 billion in spending. Percentages in parentheses indicate percentage change compared to 2003. The budget request is broken down by the following expenditures:

- Appropriations by cabinet department: 5.16 billion (-6.3%)
  - $2.9 billion - Education (+1%)
  - $1.2 million - Health and Human Services (-1%)
  - $525 million - Safety and Security (-1%)
  - $213 million - Transportation (-13%)
  - $69.0 million - Finance and Revenue (-3%)
  - $65.7 million - Commerce and Tourism (-18%)
  - $58.5 million - Judiciary (-1%)
  - $33.0 million - Legislature (-5%)
  - $30.0 million - Agriculture (-14%)
  - $28.0 million - Veterans Affairs (+12%)
  - $25.5 million - Human Resources and Administration (-11%)
  - $16.2 million - Environment (+12%)
  - $11.3 million - Science and Technology (-4%)
  - $8.9 million - Energy (-14%)
  - $7.1 million - Military (-3%)
  - $7.0 million - Secretary of State (-12%)
  - $3.2 million - Governor and Lieutenant Governor (+0%)
- Appropriations by agency: $5.16 billion (-6.3%)
  - $1.95 billion - Department of Education
  - $768 million - State Regents for Higher Education
  - $439 million - Health Care Authority
  - $388 million - Department of Human Services
  - $379 million - Department of Corrections
  - $192 million - Department of Transportation
  - $145 million - Department of Mental Health and Substance Abuse Services
  - $118 million - Department of Career and Technology Education
  - $90 million - Office of Juvenile Affairs
  - $62.4 million - Department of Public Safety
  - $59.2 million - Judiciary
  - $53.7 million - Department of Health
  - $51.1 million - Tax Commission
  - $33 million - Legislature
  - $30 million - District Attorneys Council
  - $26.9 million - Department of Veterans Affairs
  - $24.8 million - Department of Rehabilitation Services
  - $22.6 million - Department of Agriculture
  - $22.6 million - Department of Tourism and Recreation
  - $21.5 million - Department of Commerce
  - $20.1 million - Office of State Finance
  - $65.9 million - all other agencies
