= 2008 Oklahoma state budget =

2008 Budget of the Oklahoma state government
SB 334 - FY2008 Omnibus Appropriations
- Submitted: February 2007
- Submitted by: Brad Henry, Governor
- Submitted to: Oklahoma Legislature
- Passed: June 4, 2007
- Total revenue: $7.17 billion (estimated) $7.03 billion (actual)
- Total expenditures: $7.17 billion (budgeted) $6.93 billion (enacted)
- Website: http://www.ok.gov/osf/Budget/index.html Oklahoma Office of State Finance

The Oklahoma State Budget for Fiscal Year 2008, was a spending request by Governor Brad Henry to fund government operations for July 1, 2007–June 30, 2008. Governor Henry and legislative leader approved the budget in May 2007.

Figures shown in the spending request do not reflect the actual appropriations for Fiscal Year 2008, which must be authorized by the Legislature.

== Major initiatives ==
The Governor's budget identified the following major initiatives:

- Education
  - increased common education teacher salary
  - expanded early childhood education activities
  - permanent dedicated revenue toward Oklahoma Higher Learned Access Plan (OHLAP) college tuition scholarship program
- Health Care
  - increased programs for substance abusers
  - expand Medicaid coverage for children under the State Children's Health Insurance Program (SCHIP) from 185%t to 300% of the federal poverty level
  - expand Insure Oklahoma, a health insurance premium assistance program of the Oklahoma Health Care Authority, from 185% to 200% of the federal poverty level
- Economic development
  - increased funding of Economic Development Generating Excellence (EDGE) Fund, a program used promote research and economic development
  - increased funding of Oklahoma Opportunity Fund, a program used to recruit business to Oklahoma
- Workforce development
  - increased funding for workforce development centers
  - review of State government workforce compensation and recruitment levels
  - review fiscal solvency of State public pension systems
- Public safety
  - permanent funding for Oklahoma State Bureau of Investigation Internet Crimes Against Children Unit and Child Abuse Response Team Unit
  - permanent funding for Oklahoma Bureau of Narcotics and Dangerous Drugs Control anti-methamphetamine initiative

== Key funding issues ==
The Governor's budget identified the following key funding issues:

- Agriculture, Energy, Environment, and Tourism - use of Rural Economic Action Plan funding for:
  - enforcement of federal Clean Water Act relating to Concentrated Animal Feeding Operations wastewater discharges
  - covering expenses associated with the sale of the Lake Texoma State Lodge
  - lowering fuel emissions through the implementation of the Oklahoma Blue Skyways program
  - identifying future water sources in the State
  - conservation and projects aimed at lowering pollution, flood prevention, and other water projects
- Commerce
  - $150,000 to Oklahoma Department of Commerce for economic development in rural areas
  - $250,000 for a branding initiative by Oklahoma Department of Tourism and Recreation
  - $2.5 million to fund the bond payments for the Native American Cultural and Educational Authority
- Education
  - $221 million increase to Oklahoma State Department of Education for teacher salary increases, State aid to local school districts, and early childhood efforts
  - $131 million to Oklahoma State Regents for Higher Education for institutional budgets and scholarships
  - $7 million to Oklahoma Department of Career and Technology Education for teacher salary increases and State aid to local technology districts
- Health care
  - Annualization of the Federal Medical Assistance Percentages change associated with premium costs for Medicare Parts A and B and the Medicare Prescription Drug Phased-down State Contribution
  - $17.5 million for expenses associated with increased Medicaid enrollees
  - $1 million for Medicare A and B premiums
  - $8 million for expanding Medicaid coverage to include children at or below 300% of the federal poverty level
- Public safety
  - $77 million increase to the Oklahoma Department of Corrections for annualizing the state employee pay increase, contract beds, implementation and expansion of evidence-based treatment services for inmates and community corrections, and operational needs at the J. Harp Correctional Facility
  - $1 million for the establishment of terrorism institute to expand and share knowledge to help prevent terrorism and lessen its effects
  - $300,000 for operating costs of the Oklahoma Office of Homeland Security
- Capital Budget - issuing a $663.4 million bond to provide for the maintenance, replacement or construction of state facilities, payments to schools and counties, and investment in economic development and research activities

== Total revenue ==
All revenue for Fiscal Year 2008 was $7.17 billion, up 7.8% from FY2006 levels of $6.65 billion.

== Total spending ==
The Governor's budget for Fiscal Year 2007 totaled $7.17 billion in spending, an increase of 6% over Fiscal Year 2006 levels of $6.74 billion. Percentages in parentheses indicate percentage change compared to 2007. The budget request is broken down by the following expenditures:

- $110 million - Fiscal Year 2007 Supplementals

- Appropriations by Cabinet Department: $7 billion
  - $3.82 billion - Education (+8%)
  - $1.05 billion - Health (+9%)
  - $734 million - Human Services (+2%)
  - $701 million - Safety and Security (+2%)
  - $286 million - Transportation (+0%)
  - $106 million - Finance and Revenue (+1%)
  - $80.8 million - Judiciary (+2%)
  - $75.8 million - Commerce and Tourism (+4%)
  - $40.2 million - Veterans Affairs (+2%)
  - $39.6 million - Agriculture (+6%)
  - $36.1 million - Legislature (+1%)
  - $24.5 million - Science and Technology (+9%)
  - $23.6 million - Human Resources and Administration (+1%)
  - $17.5 million - Energy (+2%)
  - $15.3 million - Environment (-14%)
  - $14.9 million - Military (+15%)
  - $8.2 million - Secretary of State (-9%)
  - $3.5 million - Governor and Lieutenant Governor (+9%)
- Appropriations by agency: $7 billion
  - $2.57 billion - Department of Education
  - $1.07 billion - State Regents for Higher Education
  - $763 million - Health Care Authority
  - $544 million - Department of Human Services
  - $500 million - Department of Corrections
  - $285 million - Department of Transportation
  - $221 million - Department of Mental Health and Substance Abuse Services
  - $154 million - Department of Career and Technology Education
  - $107 million - Office of Juvenile Affairs
  - $91.3 million - Department of Public Safety
  - $80.8 million - Judiciary
  - $69.3 million - Department of Health
  - $48.2 million - Tax Commission
  - $40.2 million - Department of Veterans Affairs
  - $39.6 million - District Attorneys Council
  - $36.1 million - Legislature
  - $30.5 million - Department of Agriculture
  - $29.3 million - Department of Rehabilitation Services
  - $28.1 million - Department of Commerce
  - $28.1 million - Office of State Finance
  - $27.6 million - Department of Tourism and Recreation
  - $236.9 million - All Other Agencies

== Total appropriations ==
The Oklahoma Legislature approved total appropriations for fiscal year 2008 of $6.9 billion. Percentages in parentheses indicate percentage change compared to the Governor's budget. The final appropriations are broken down by the following expenditures:

- Appropriations by Cabinet Department: $6.9 billion (-2%)
  - $3.72 billion - Education (-3%)
  - $1.05 billion - Health (+0%)
  - $752 million - Human Services (+2%)
  - $689 million - Safety and Security (-2%)
  - $218 million - Transportation (-24%)
  - $106 million - Finance and Revenue (+0%)
  - $85.8 million - Judiciary (+6%)
  - $77.4 million - Commerce and Tourism (+2%)
  - $42.9 million - Agriculture (+8%)
  - $40.3 million - Veterans Affairs (+0%)
  - $38.8 million - Legislature (+7%)
  - $30 million - Human Resources and Administration (+27%)
  - $22.5 million - Science and Technology (-8%)
  - $16.5 million - Environment (+8%)
  - $13.7 million - Military (-8%)
  - $13.2 million - Energy (-25%)
  - $9.1 million - Secretary of State (+11%)
  - $3.4 million - Governor and Lieutenant Governor (-3%)
