= 2014 Oklahoma state budget =

2014 Budget of the Oklahoma state government
Fiscal Year 2014 General Appropriations
- Submitted: February 4, 2013
- Submitted by: Mary Fallin
- Submitted to: 54th Legislature
- Passed: May 20, 2013
- Total revenue: $7 billion (Governor estimated) $7.1 billion (Enacted)
- Total expenditures: $7 billion (Governor requested) $7.1 billion (Enacted)
- Website: Oklahoma Office of Management and Enterprise Services

The Oklahoma State Budget for Fiscal Year 2014, is a spending request by Governor Mary Fallin to fund government operations for July 1, 2013–June 30, 2014. Governor Fallin proposed the budget on February 4, 2013. This was Governor Fallin's third budget submitted as governor.

The Oklahoma Legislature approved the budget on May 14, 2013, and Governor Fallin signed the budget into law on May 20, 2013.

== History ==
Governor Mary Fallin proposed her 2014 budget request in her 2013 State of the State Address. Governor Fallin and legislative leaderships reached an agreement on the budget request on May 2, 2012. The Oklahoma House of Representatives approves the budget deal on May 9, the Senate on May 14, with the Governor signing the budget into law on May 20.

== Governor's major issues ==
In her Budget Message to the Legislature, Governor Fallin identified the following issues are major goals for her Executive Budget.

=== Tax cut ===
Governor Fallin’s budget includes a 0.25 percent reduction to Oklahoma’s top individual income tax rate from 5.25% to 5%, reducing state revenue by $40.7 million in fiscal year 2014 and $105.8 in each fiscal year thereafter.

=== Supplemental funding ===
- $10 million - State Capitol building repairs
- $8.5 million - fringe benefits for teachers statewide

=== Health and human services ===
- $3.5 million - substance abuse crisis centers for Oklahoma Department of Mental Health and Substance Abuse Services
- $2.3 million - counseling and assistance to children with serious emotional distress for Oklahoma Department of Mental Health and Substance Abuse Services
- $1.2 million - prescription drug abuse prevention and treatment initiatives for Oklahoma Department of Mental Health and Substance Abuse Services
- $0.5 million - suicide prevention program for Oklahoma Department of Mental Health and Substance Abuse Services
- $0.7 million - infant mortality prevention program for Oklahoma State Department of Health
- $40 million - increased Medicaid costs resulting from Affordable Care Act for Oklahoma Health Care Authority
- $40 million - increase child welfare funding for Oklahoma Department of Human Services
- $10.6 million - development disability community service program for Oklahoma Department of Human Services
- $1.5 million - facility maintenance for Oklahoma Office of Juvenile Affairs
- $2.5 million - indigent care program for Oklahoma State University-Medical Authority

=== Education ===
- $13.5 million - implement educational reforms for Oklahoma State Department of Education

=== Transportation ===
- $2.1 million - address bridge improvement and turnpike modernization for the Oklahoma Department of Transportation

=== Public safety ===
- $1 million - address population growth for Oklahoma Department of Corrections
- $1 million - offset the loss of other funds for Oklahoma District Attorneys Council
- $0.3 million - updated systems for Oklahoma Pardon and Parole Board
- $5 million - Trooper Academy for the Oklahoma Highway Patrol
- $2.5 million - support for Oklahoma Office of the Chief Medical Examiner operations

=== Other initiatives ===
- $5 million - dedicating funding to the Quick Action Closing Fund for the Oklahoma Department of Commerce
- $0.1 million - increased funding for the Oklahoma Ethics Commission
- $1.5 million - ensure state control over public water supply program under Environmental Protection Agency regulations
- $0.2 million - state employee compensation study
- $1 million - State Emergency Fund

== Total spending ==
=== Requested ===
The governor's proposed Executive Budget for 2014 totals $7 billion in spending. Figures shown in the spending request do not reflect the actual appropriations for Fiscal Year 2014, which must be authorized by the Legislature. Percentages in parentheses indicate percentage change compared to Fiscal Year 2013 enacted budget. The budget request is broken down by the following expenditures:

- Appropriations by Cabinet Department: $7 billion (+2%)
  - $3.4 billion - Education (+0%)
  - $1.4 billion - Health (+4%)
  - $815 million - Human Services (+6%)
  - $656 million - Safety and Security (+0%)
  - $209 million - Transportation (+1%)
  - $116 million - Finance and Revenue (-1%)
  - $85.0 million - Commerce and Tourism (+6%)
  - $84.6 million - Judiciary (+0%)
  - $35.7 million - Agriculture (-5%)
  - $35.7 million - Veterans Affairs (+0%)
  - $32.6 million - Legislature (+0%)
  - $17.8 million - Science and Technology (+0%)
  - $14.6 million - Environment (+0%)
  - $12.1 million - Energy (+0%)
  - $10.7 million - Military (+0%)
  - $8.5 million - Secretary of State (+1%)
  - $2.5 million - Governor and Lieutenant Governor (+0%)

=== Enacted ===
The Oklahoma Legislature approved total appropriations for fiscal year 2014 of $7.1 billion. Percentages in parentheses indicate percentage change compared to Fiscal Year 2013 enacted budget. The final appropriations for Fiscal Year 2014 are broken down by the following expenditures:

- Appropriations by Cabinet Department: $7.1 billion (+5%)
  - $3.6 billion - Education (+6%)
  - $1.4 billion - Health (+8%)
  - $762 million - Human Services (+0%)
  - $667 million - Safety and Security (+0%)
  - $209 million - Transportation (+1%)
  - $135 million - Finance (+24%)
  - $89.2 million - Judiciary (+5%)
  - $83.0 million - Commerce and Tourism (+4%)
  - $39.7 million - Legislature (+21%)
  - $36.4 million - Agriculture (-3%)
  - $35.7 million - Veterans Affairs (+0%)
  - $19.1 million - Environment (+29%)
  - $17.8 million - Science and Technology (+0%)
  - $17.8 million - Energy (+47%)
  - $11.7 million - Military (+9%)
  - $8.5 million - Secretary of State (+1%)
  - $2.6 million - Governor and Lieutenant Governor (-4%)
- Numbers have been rounded
