= 2009 Oklahoma state budget =

2008 Budget of the Oklahoma state government
HB 2276 - FY2009 General Appropriations
- Submitted: February 4, 2008
- Submitted by: Brad Henry, Governor
- Submitted to: Oklahoma Legislature
- Total revenue: $7.3 billion (estimated)
- Total expenditures: $7.3 billion (requested) $7.1 billion (enacted)
- Website: http://www.ok.gov/osf/Budget/index.html Oklahoma Office of State Finance

The Oklahoma State Budget for Fiscal Year 2009, was a spending request by Governor Brad Henry to fund government operations for July 1, 2008–June 30, 2009. Governor Henry and the Legislature approved the budget in May 2008.

Figures shown in the spending request do not reflect the actual appropriations for Fiscal Year 2009, which must be authorized by the Legislature.

== Key funding issues ==
The Governor's budget identified the following key funding issues:

- Annualizations - $67 million increase in base agency budgets to replace one-time funding
- Education - $200 million additional funding
  - Common Education
  - $65 million to implement $1,200/annual teacher pay raise
  - $17 million to fund increased employer contributions to the Oklahoma Teachers' Retirement System
  - $10 million in additional State Aid to local school districts
  - $4 million for standardized testing remediation
  - $3 million for Sooner Start
  - $2.5 million for high school graduation coaches
  - $1.5 million for math labs
  - $31.6 million to replace one-time funding
  - Career Technology Education
  - $3.1 million to implement teacher pay raise
  - $1.2 million to fund increased employer contributions to the Oklahoma Teachers' Retirement System
  - $1 million in additional State Aid
  - $1 million to purchase Altus Municipal Airport
  - $1.4 million to replace one-time funding
  - Higher Education
  - $13 million to fund increased employer contributions to the Oklahoma Teachers' Retirement System
  - $22.8 million to replace one-time funding
- Health Care
  - $50.4 million to replace Federal funding for Medicare Part A and B
  - $22 million to replace one-time funding
  - $17.7 million to cover costs associated with increase Medicaid enrollment
  - $2.5 million for "Money Follows the Person" program
  - $250,000 for fiscal agent contract increases
- Safety and Security
  - $32.4 million to the Oklahoma Department of Corrections to address 2.7% inmate population growth
  - $1.3 million to Office of the Oklahoma Attorney General for Domestic Violence Unit
- Human Services - $20.7 million to replace Federal funding from the Federal Medicare Assistance percentage
- Capital Budget Proposal - The Governor proposed a $189 million bond issue to cover cost associated with constructing new state buildings and other projects:
  - Disaster Recovery - $46 million
  - Supreme Court Building - $11 million
  - Native American Cultural Museum - $45 million
  - Urban Education Centers - $62 million
  - Office of Juvenile Affairs Offender Facility - $20 million
  - Office of Juvenile Affairs Detention Centers - $4.9 million

== Total revenue ==
All revenue for Fiscal Year 2008 was $7.3 billion.

== Total spending ==
The Governor's budget for Fiscal Year 2009 totaled $7.3 billion in spending, an increase of 6% from Fiscal Year 2008 enacted levels of $6.9 billion. Percentages in parentheses indicate percentage change compared to 2008 enacted levels. The budget request is broken down by the following expenditures:

- $41.1 million - Fiscal Year 2008 Supplementals
- Appropriations by Cabinet Department: $7.3 billion (+6%)
  - $3.9 billion - Education (+5%)
  - $1.2 billion - Health (+10%)
  - $781 million - Human Services (+4%)
  - $744 million - Safety and Security (+8%)
  - $221 million - Transportation (+1%)
  - $108 million - Finance and Revenue (+2%)
  - $86.8 million - Judiciary (+1%)
  - $82.0 million - Commerce and Tourism (+6%)
  - $42.9 million - Agriculture (+0%)
  - $41.7 million - Veterans Affairs (+4%)
  - $38.3 million - Legislature (-1%)
  - $34.5 million - Science and Technology (+54%)
  - $26.9 million - Human Resources and Administration (-4%)
  - $13.8 million - Energy (+5%)
  - $17.5 million - Environment (+6%)
  - $13.4 million - Military (-2%)
  - $8.5 million - Secretary of State (-6%)
  - $3.4 million - Governor and Lieutenant Governor (+2%)

== Total appropriations ==
The Oklahoma Legislature approved total appropriations for fiscal year 2008 of $6.9 billion. Percentages in parentheses indicate percentage change compared to the Governor's budget. The final appropriations are broken down by the following expenditures:

- Appropriations by Cabinet Department: $7.1 billion (-3%)
  - $3.8 billion - Education (-3%)
  - $1.1 billion - Health (-8%)
  - $758 million - Human Services (-3%)
  - $733 million - Safety and Security (-1%)
  - $208 million - Transportation (-6%)
  - $94.9 million - Commerce and Tourism (+15%)
  - $92.5 million - Finance and Revenue (-14%)
  - $86.0 million - Judiciary (-1%)
  - $44.8 million - Agriculture (+4%)
  - $40.3 million - Veterans Affairs (-3%)
  - $39.4 million - Legislature (+3%)
  - $27.6 million - Human Resources and Administration (+3%)
  - $22.5 million - Science and Technology (-35%)
  - $16.5 million - Environment (-6%)
  - $13.4 million - Energy (-3%)
  - $13.1 million - Military (-2%)
  - $8.1 million - Secretary of State (-5%)
  - $3.4 million - Governor and Lieutenant Governor (+0%)
