= 2010 Oklahoma state budget =

2010 Budget of the Oklahoma state government
SB 216 - 2010 General Appropriations
- Submitted: February 2, 2009
- Submitted by: Brad Henry
- Submitted to: 52nd Legislature
- Passed: June 1, 2009
- Total revenue: $7.1 billion
- Total expenditures: $7.1 billion
- Website: http://www.ok.gov/osf/Budget/index.html Oklahoma Office of State Finance

The Oklahoma State Budget for Fiscal Year 2010, is a spending request by Governor Brad Henry to fund government operations for July 1, 2009–June 30, 2010. Governor Henry and legislative leader approved the budget in May 2009.

Figures shown in the spending request do not reflect the actual appropriations for Fiscal Year 2011, which must be authorized by the Legislature.

== Overview ==
The state budget for fiscal year 2010 began with a decrease in tax revenues of almost $310 million, or 4.4%, from the previous fiscal year. A primary reason for this decrease was enactment of House Bill 1172 in 2006. HB1172 enacted the largest tax cut in state history by lowering the state income tax rate from 6.25% in 2006 to 5.25% in 2011. HB1172 also increased the standard deduction to match the federal standard deduction in 2010. The American Recovery and Reinvestment Act of 2009 was passed February 2009 and the State applied for money available under the act. This included $404 million for the state Medicaid program and $236 million for education, among others. These funds allowed the Oklahoma Legislature to balance the state budget.

Early on in the fiscal year, the effects of the Great Recession reached Oklahoma and caused tax revenues to decrease significantly. The Governor's Office reported that tax revenues decreased $1.2 billion between July 2009 and September 2009. This decrease caused Governor Brad Henry to order all state agencies to decrease their budgets by 5%. By November 2009, Governor Henry ordered the cuts increased to 7% and then to 7.5% by January 2010. By the end of the fiscal year, tax revenues had decreased from an estimated $6.8 billion in 2009 to $5.3 billion in 2010, a net decrease of 22%.

== Key Funding Issues ==
- Education - No cuts to State education agencies due to reduced tax revenues
- Health and Human Services - No cuts to State health and human services agencies due to reduced tax revenues
- Public Safety - No cuts to State law enforcement agencies due to reduced tax revenues
- Appropriations reduction - Cut all other agencies by up to 10% but allow agencies to increase fees to make up difference

== Total Revenue ==
Estimated tax revenue for fiscal year 2011 is $6.8 billion, an estimated decrease of 4.4% from FY2009 amounts of $7 billion:

- $2.1 billion - Individual Income Tax
- $1.9 billion - Sales and Use Tax
- $526 million - Gross Production Tax
- $342 million - Corporate Income Tax
- $177 million - Motor Vehicle Tax
- $605 million - Other Taxes
- $1.15 billion - Other Sources

All revenue of the $7.1 billion budget revenue breaks down as follows:

- $6.8 billion - All taxes
- $83.5 million - Fee increases
- $206 million - Fund Transfers
- $45 million - Government Efficiency Reform

== Total Spending ==
The projected gross state product (GSP) for 2009 was listed at $153.8 billion. The fiscal year 2011 spending represents 4.6% of GSP.

The Governor's budget for 2010 totaled $7.1 billion in spending, unchanged from Fiscal Year 2009 levels. Percentages in parentheses indicate percentage change compared to 2009. The budget request is broken down by the following expenditures:

- Appropriations by Cabinet Department: 7.1 billion (+0%)
  - $3.8 billion - Education (+1%)
  - $1.1 billion - Health (+0%)
  - $760 million - Human Services (+0%)
  - $718 million - Safety and Security (-2%)
  - $208 million - Transportation (+0%)
  - $90.1 million - Commerce and Tourism (-5%)
  - $83.3 million - Finance and Revenue (-10%)
  - $85.2 million - Judiciary (-1%)
  - $41.4 million - Agriculture (-8%)
  - $40.3 million - Veterans Affairs (+0%)
  - $37.3 million - Legislature (-5%)
  - $25.1 million - Human Resources and Administration (-9%)
  - $22.5 million - Science and Technology (+0%)
  - $13.4 million - Environment (-19%)
  - $13 million - Military (-1%)
  - $11.9 million - Energy (-11%)
  - $7.2 million - Secretary of State (-12%)
  - $3.1 million - Governor and Lieutenant Governor (-4%)

== Total Appropriations ==
The Oklahoma Legislature approved total appropriations for fiscal year 2010 of $7.2 billion. Percentages in parentheses indicate percentage change compared to the Governor's budget. The final appropriations are broken down by the following expenditures:

- Appropriations by Cabinet Department: 7.2 billion (+2%)
  - $3.8 billion - Education (+1%)
  - $1.3 billion - Health (+14%)
  - $750 million - Human Services (-1%)
  - $708 million - Safety and Security (-1%)
  - $208 million - Transportation (+0%)
  - $87.3 million - Finance and Revenue (+5%)
  - $80.2 million - Judiciary (-6%)
  - $91.3 million - Commerce and Tourism (+1%)
  - $42.1 million - Agriculture (+2%)
  - $40.3 million - Veterans Affairs (+0%)
  - $37 million - Legislature (-1%)
  - $25.7 million - Human Resources and Administration (+2%)
  - $22 million - Science and Technology (-2%)
  - $15.8 million - Environment (+18%)
  - $12.5 million - Energy (+5%)
  - $12.3 million - Military (-5%)
  - $7.6 million - Secretary of State (+6%)
  - $3.1 million - Governor and Lieutenant Governor (+0%)

Following the effects of the Great Recession on Oklahoma, Governor Brad Henry ordered an across the board 7.25% spending cut for all State agencies.

- Appropriations by Cabinet Department: $6.7 billion
  - $3.5 billion - Education
  - $1.2 billion - Health
  - $694 million - Human Services
  - $955 million - Safety and Security
  - $192 million - Transportation
  - $80.8 million - Finance and Revenue
  - $74.2 million - Judiciary
  - $84.5 million - Commerce and Tourism
  - $38.9 million - Agriculture
  - $37.3 million - Veterans Affairs
  - $34.2 million - Legislature
  - $23.8 million - Human Resources and Administration
  - $20.4 million - Science and Technology
  - $14.6 million - Environment
  - $11.6 million - Energy
  - $11.4 million - Military (
  - $7.0 million - Secretary of State
  - $2.9 million - Governor and Lieutenant Governor
