= Oklahoma Teachers' Retirement System =

Oklahoma Teacher's Retirement System (OTRS) is the pension program for public education employees in the US State of Oklahoma. As of June 30, 2014, the program had nearly 168,000 members. Public education teachers and administrators are required to be OTRS members; support staff can join voluntarily. State law established OTRS in 1943 to manage retirement funds and provide financial security for public education employees. Its first checks to retirees were sent out in 1947. It is administered by a staff and 14-member board of trustees. Its current executive director is Tom Spencer, who started in that position on November 1, 2014.

== Organization ==
The TRS is governed by a 15-member Board of Trustees composed of 10 appointed members, four ex officio members, and one non-voting member. The Governor of Oklahoma appoints six members to the Board and the Speaker of the State House of Representatives and the President Pro Tempore of the State Senate each appoint two members to the Board. The three ex officio members are the State Public Schools Superintendent, the State Treasurer, the Director of the Office of State Finance and the Director of the Career Technology System. All four ex officio members are allowed by state statute to designate a member to the Board in their stead. The non-voting member is appointed by an organization representing retired educators.

Board of Trustees
Name	Position	City
Vernon Florence	Chairman	Edmond
Roger Gaddis	Vice Chairman	Ada
Judie Harris	Secretary	Oklahoma City
Steve Massey	Trustee (non-voting)	Stroud
Tim Allen	Designee of Oklahoma State Treasurer, Trustee	Oklahoma City
Rod Boles	Trustee	Sulphur
Brandy Manek	Designee of Director of the Office of Management and Enterprise Services, Trustee	Harrah
Lisa Henderson	Trustee	Oklahoma City
Mathangi Shankar	Designee of the State Superintendent of Public Education, Trustee	Edmond
Michael Kellogg	Trustee	Kiowa
Brandon Meyer	Trustee	Stillwater
Chris Rector	Trustee	Tulsa
Stephen Streeter	Trustee	Tulsa
Drew Williamson	Trustee	Oklahoma City
Dr. Greg Winters	Designee of The Director of the State Department of Oklahoma Career Tech, Trustee	El Reno

=== Committees ===
The Board of Trustees has three standing committees, the Investment Committee, the Audit Committee, and the Governance Committee. These panels focus on their respective topics and conduct work on the areas of focus that are more detailed than appropriate for full Board consideration. No actions of the committees are final and binding unless approved by the full Board.

The Board meets 10 times a year, typically on the fourth Wednesday of the month. The Investment Committee usually meets every month on the Tuesday afternoon before the regularly scheduled Board meeting.

== Retirement details ==
OTRS utilizes a defined benefit retirement plan that pay the retiree a specific benefit for life beginning at his or her retirement.

=== Retirement eligibility ===
To be vested in OTRS and subsequently eligible to receive a monthly retirement benefit, a client must accumulate at least five years of eligible service in Oklahoma public schools. A vested client is eligible to begin receiving monthly benefits at age 62, or age 65, depending on which combination they fall under.

There are three thresholds for eligibility to retire with benefits. Those who joined OTRS prior to July 1, 1992, can retire when his or her age and years of creditable service total 80 points, or they have reached 62 years of age. People who joined the system after that date can retire when their age and years of creditable service total 90 points, or they have reached 62 years of age. Anyone joining the system after November 1, 2011, can retire at sixty, as long as they have accumulated 90 points, or at age 65.

=== Early retirement ===
Reduced benefits are available for clients who have not reached full retirement eligibility under regular retirement. To meet this criterion, the OTRS member either must complete at least 30 years of state service, but be younger than age 50, or the person in question must have at least five years of vested service, and be between the ages of 55 and 61 under the rule of 80, or rule of 90. It the client falls under rule of 90/65, they will be eligible for reduced benefits between the ages of 60 and 64.

=== Benefits ===
OTRS calculates its benefits using the following formula:

2 percent x (service years) x (final average salary [base salary or actual W2 earnings for the year?]) ÷ 12 = monthly benefit.

Depending on the number of service years and the final average salary, a person's retirement benefit can vary, but each person, regardless, will receive 2 percent. Additionally, for service earned prior to June 30, 1995, contributions into the system only paid on either the first $25,000 of $40,000 of annual income. Because the contributions for these years of service were capped, the retirement benefits are also capped. This results in a two-tiered retirement benefit calculation with the first tier being those years on which contributions were capped and the uncapped years in the second tier, which results in a retirement benefit that is smaller than would be expected based solely on the formula above.

There are two traditional categories of OTRS clients: a Rule of 80 (or age 62) and Rule of 90 (or age 62) retirement eligibility. Those who joined the system prior to July 1, 1992, are under the Rule of 80 and those who joined on or after that date are under the Rule of 90. The benefit formula is the same for both; only the retirement eligibility is different. A legislative change enacted in 2011 created a third tier for those who join OTRS after Nov. 1, 2011. These clients will have the same benefit calculation, but their retirement eligibility will be the Rule of 90 with a minimum age of 60 (or age 65).

=== EESIP ===
The Education Employees Service Incentive Plan (EESIP) provides an incentive to continue service beyond regular retirement eligibility. To participate, a client must be on the high base cap at $40,000. EESIP provides an opportunity to wear away the salary cap by moving two years of service from the $40,000 salary cap tier to the uncapped salary cap tier for each year worked beyond July 1 of the school year in which retirement eligibility is met. Years moved on the two-for-one EESIP plan increases the number of uncapped years used in the calculation of the final average salary.

In order to qualify for the EESIP, an employee must be an active contributor, employed within a qualified employer such as an elementary or secondary school, career tech center, two-year college, or state education agency. The employee must work an additional year after the regular retirement age, and meet an uncapped average salary tier exceeding $40,000. Their contributions prior to July 1, 1995, were remitted on maximum compensation level and they must pay the contribution deficit on years between 1987-1988 and 1994-1995 where the salary exceeded $40,000.

== Investments ==
The Board of Trustees determines investment of OTRS funds. In January 2009, the board made a strategic decision to invest in high-yield bonds. As of June 30, 2011, all cap/large cap domestic equities comprised 21.8% of assets, mid cap domestic equities 13.2% and small cap domestic equities 10%. The target asset allocation, is 45% is in domestic equity, 15% in international equity, 25% in fixed income, 5% in high-yield bonds, 5% in MLP and 5% in private equity. OTRS' investment consultant is Gregory W. Group. JPMorgan Chase is the system's custodial bank. OTRS utilizes a spectrum of investment managers, including but not limited to Mackay Shields, Loomis Sayles, Lord Abbett, Hoisington, and Stephens.

As of June 30, 2014, total balance of OTRS funds stood in excess of $14B.

== Unfunded liability ==
Oklahoma's teachers’ retirement program has long been one of the most underfunded of its kind in the United States. Employer contributions did not begin until 1986, a fact that has largely contributed to its $10.4 billion unfunded liability as of May 2011.

The 2008 Public Fund Survey ranked OTRS as having the fourth-lowest funding ratio (assets set aside compared to pension liability) among 126 state pension plans. At the time of that ranking, OTRS’ funding ratio was 50.5%. That figure has since vacillated in the wake of the economic downturn.

The retirement system's viability for future retirees has prompted legislative maneuvering in recent years. In 2010, OTRS staff told The Oklahoman newspaper there were only three options to shore up the system. Those three things were putting more money into the system, increase investment returns, or doing something about benefits.

The retirement system received a boost in 2006 when the Oklahoma State Legislature increased the employer's contribution to OTRS from 7% to 9% over a three-year period. From 2009 to 2011, the administration of OTRS, with guidance from its board of directors, has renegotiated investment contracts that will save the agency $2.3 million annually. The agency also streamlined processes and instituted other operational efficiencies, which have saved OTRS more than $7.6 million in this two-year time frame. In addition, OTRS has noted that it achieved a 9.4% rate of return on its investment from 1992 through 2011, well outpacing its long-term target of 8%.

=== Legislation to Address the Unfunded Liability ===
In 2011, Oklahoma lawmakers passed Senate Bill 377 and House Bill 2132, which immediately reduced the unfunded liability of the Teachers’ Retirement System by $2.9 billion of debt. The significant changes in SB 377 and HB 2132 include: raising the retirement age for new members coming into the system (current members will be unaffected) and preventing the legislature from granting cost of living adjustments (COLAs) to retirees unless funding is provided. The Oklahoma Legislature still has the ability to grant COLAs but only when it provides the funds to pay for them. This change alone reduces the OTRS' unfunded liability to $7.5 billion.

== Recent actuarial status ==
Despite a long history of fiscal troubles, the Oklahoma Teachers' Retirement System has seen a steady improvement in its over-all actuarial condition since 2012. This is due in part to strong investment performance as well as fiscal reforms enacted by the state legislature. In 2017, the state's largest newspaper called the Teacher Retirement System "a rare success story in state government financial management."

As of June 30, 2018, the Oklahoma Teachers' Retirement System reduced its unfunded actuarial accrual liability (UAAL) to approximately $6.13 billion and increased its overall funded ratio to 73.5%. OTRS has also revised its assumed rate of return to "7.50% per year, net of investment-related expenses and compounded annually, composed of an assumed 2.50% inflation rate and a 5.00% real rate of return."

== Impact of the COVID-19 pandemic (2019 – 2021 ) ==
The Oklahoma Teacher Retirement System experienced significant investment volatility as a result of the COVID-19 pandemic. As of June 2020, the UAAL had increased to $8.641 billion and the funded ratio had decreased slightly, to 71.5%. Although a marked decline in comparison to pre-pandemic levels, this nevertheless represented an improvement in performance over the previous year. According to the OTRS Board of Trustees, "[t]he primary cause of the increase was strong investment returns for the year."

== Post-COVID 19 actuarial status (2022 - present) ==
According to the 2025 OTRS Actuarial Valuation Report,the Oklahoma Teachers' Retirement System unfunded accrued actuarial liability (UAAL) "decreased by $0.680 billion, from $6.758 billion as of June 30, 2024 to $6.078 billion as of June 30, 2025. The funded ratio increased from 77.0% to 80.0% as of June 30, 2025." This improvement in the UAAL can be attributed primarily to strong investment performance and state government's "continuation of dedicated revenue earmarked to pay down the unfunded liability." OTRS assets as of 30 June, 2025 totaled approximately $26.9 billion with liabilities of $1.7 billion, for a net position of $25.18 billion. OTRS is expected to eliminate its current UAAL in 9 years-- by 2034-- based upon the current contribution and benefit provisions, assuming no actuarial gains or losses in the future" and assuming a long-term return on investment of 7.00%

== Current asset allocation (2025) ==
The OTRS Board of Trustees "follows the 'Prudent Investor' standard, which is considered the highest standard in making investment decisions for the Plan. To protect and grow the fund, the Board and its advisors maintain a diversified portfolio across multiple asset classes, reducing risk while pursuing strong long-term returns." As of 30 June, 2025 the OTRS assets allocation was as follows: Domestic Equity 38.30% Fixed Income 27.10% International Equity 16.40% Real Estate 6.70% Private Equity 6.30% Private Debt 3.30% Cash 1.90%
