= Brad Henry =

American politician (born 1963)

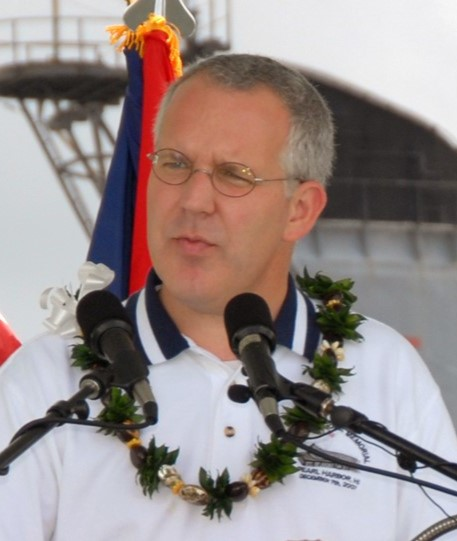
- Henry in 2007

26th Governor of Oklahoma
- In office January 13, 2003 – January 10, 2011
- Lieutenant: Mary Fallin; Jari Askins
- Preceded by: Frank Keating
- Succeeded by: Mary Fallin

Member of the Oklahoma Senate from the 17th district
- In office 1992–2003
- Preceded by: Carl Franklin
- Succeeded by: Charlie Laster

Personal details
- Born: Charles Bradford Henry; July 10, 1963 (age 63) Shawnee, Oklahoma, U.S.
- Party: Democratic
- Spouse: Kim Blaine
- Children: 4
- Education: University of Oklahoma (BA, JD)

Charles Bradford Henry (born July 10, 1963) is an American politician and lawyer who served as the 26th governor of Oklahoma from 2003 to 2011. A member of the Democratic Party, he previously served as a member of the Oklahoma Senate from 1992 to 2003. As of 2026, he is the most recent Democrat to have been elected or serve as governor of Oklahoma.

Henry was elected governor in 2002 with 43.2% of the vote and re-elected for a second term in 2006 with 66.5% of the vote. He was the third governor and second Democrat in Oklahoma history to serve two consecutive terms, along with Democrat George Nigh and Republican Frank Keating. Henry was unable to seek a third term in the 2010 election due to term limits set by the Oklahoma Constitution. He was succeeded as governor by Republican former Lieutenant Governor and former U.S. Representative Mary Fallin on January 10, 2011.

Henry had been mentioned as a possible candidate for the U.S. Senate, but declined to run in the 2014 special election to replace Tom Coburn.

== Early life and education ==
Brad Henry was born in Shawnee, Oklahoma, the son of Charles Henry, a prominent judge and former state representative. After graduating from Shawnee High School in 1981, Henry attended the University of Oklahoma as a President's Leadership Scholar and earned a bachelor's degree in economics in 1985. He was a member of Delta Tau Delta fraternity. In 1988, he was awarded his J.D. degree from the University of Oklahoma College of Law, where he served as managing editor of the Law Review.

Henry practiced law in Shawnee, Oklahoma before running for the Oklahoma State Senate. He served as a state senator from 1992 until he became governor.

== Gubernatorial campaigns ==
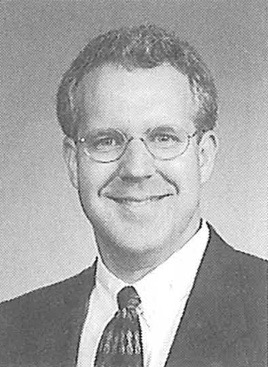
Henry as a State Senator

=== 2002 ===
In the 2002 election for governor, Henry defeated State Senator Enoch Kelly Haney and businessman Vince Orza in the primary election. In the general election, he defeated former Republican Congressman Steve Largent, an NFL Hall of Famer, by just over one-half of one percent of the vote, in a race that also included Independent candidate Gary Richardson, a retired federal prosecutor. Henry received 448,143 votes (43.27%) to Largent's 441,277 votes (42.61%). Richardson, a former Republican candidate, received 146,200 votes (14%).

Henry ran a campaign of "barnstorming" rural areas, and stopping at Wal-Mart stores in an RV with supporters. Henry was endorsed by football coach Barry Switzer, who has widespread popularity in Oklahoma and accompanied Henry to many campaign events.

On the policy side of the campaign, Henry branded himself as the "education governor." He argued for increasing teachers' salaries and funding for higher education in the state by approving a state lottery to raise money.

=== 2006 ===
In the Democratic Party primary election on July 25, 2006, Henry received 218,712 votes, 86% of the vote.

In the November 7 general election, Henry faced Fifth District U.S. Congressman Republican Ernest Istook and won with 66% of the vote. He won with a higher total than any gubernatorial candidate in almost fifty years. He only lost the three counties of the Panhandle, and won by large margins in a number of counties that normally vote Republican.

== Governor of Oklahoma (2003-2011) ==
Henry was sworn in as Oklahoma's 26th governor on January 13, 2003, with the oath of office being administered by his cousin, federal appeals court judge Robert Harlan Henry. As governor, he was a member of the National Governors Association, the Southern Governors' Association, and the Democratic Governors Association. He was the president of the Council of State Governments in 2007.

Henry was generally seen as a moderate Democrat. Henry is pro-choice and has vetoed legislation to mandate ultrasound viewings prior to abortion procedures. He has a mixed view of racial affirmative action, supporting it in college and graduate schools, but not in hiring for the bureaucracy. Henry supports expanding public healthcare and holding HMOs accountable for poor care; however, he also is in favor of upholding the death penalty and is against gun control. The governor supports tax cuts for the lower and middle classes and believes in keeping the income tax; he also supports using the "War on Drugs" strategy to combat methamphetamine use within his state.

Henry made national headlines by giving sanctuary from the controversial redistricting warrant to Texas Democrats in that state's legislature by allowing them to travel across state lines into Oklahoma en masse to deny a quorum for voting on a redistricting plan. "Our position is that, without a warrant signed by a judge, we have no authority. Even under those circumstances, we are hesitant to get pulled into a Texas political battle. If we're going to do battle with Texas, we prefer that it be on the football field," Henry said through his spokesman.

On May 27, 2004, Governor Brad Henry issued Executive Order 04-21, which created the Governor's Ethnic American Advisory Council. The Ethnic American Advisory Council then published an English translation of the Quran embossed with the Oklahoma State seal which was then distributed to 149 Oklahoma state legislators. There were 35 lawmakers who declined to accept the copy of the Quran that they were offered. After refusing the copy of the Quran, Republican State Representative Rex Duncan wrote a letter to his colleagues explaining, "Most Oklahomans do not endorse the idea of killing innocent women and children in the name of ideology."

In 2003, Henry signed bills into law that: made downloading child pornography a crime, strengthened the financial oversight of HMOs by the state, created a $300,000 cap on noneconomic damages for obstetric and emergency room cases except in wrongful death cases or if negligence is shown and made other changes to regulate medical liability actions, penalized predatory lending, authorized payday lending, and placed a moratorium on the sale of water from a sole source aquifer. He also was a strong supporter of a ballot proposal to establish a statewide lottery to benefit schools.

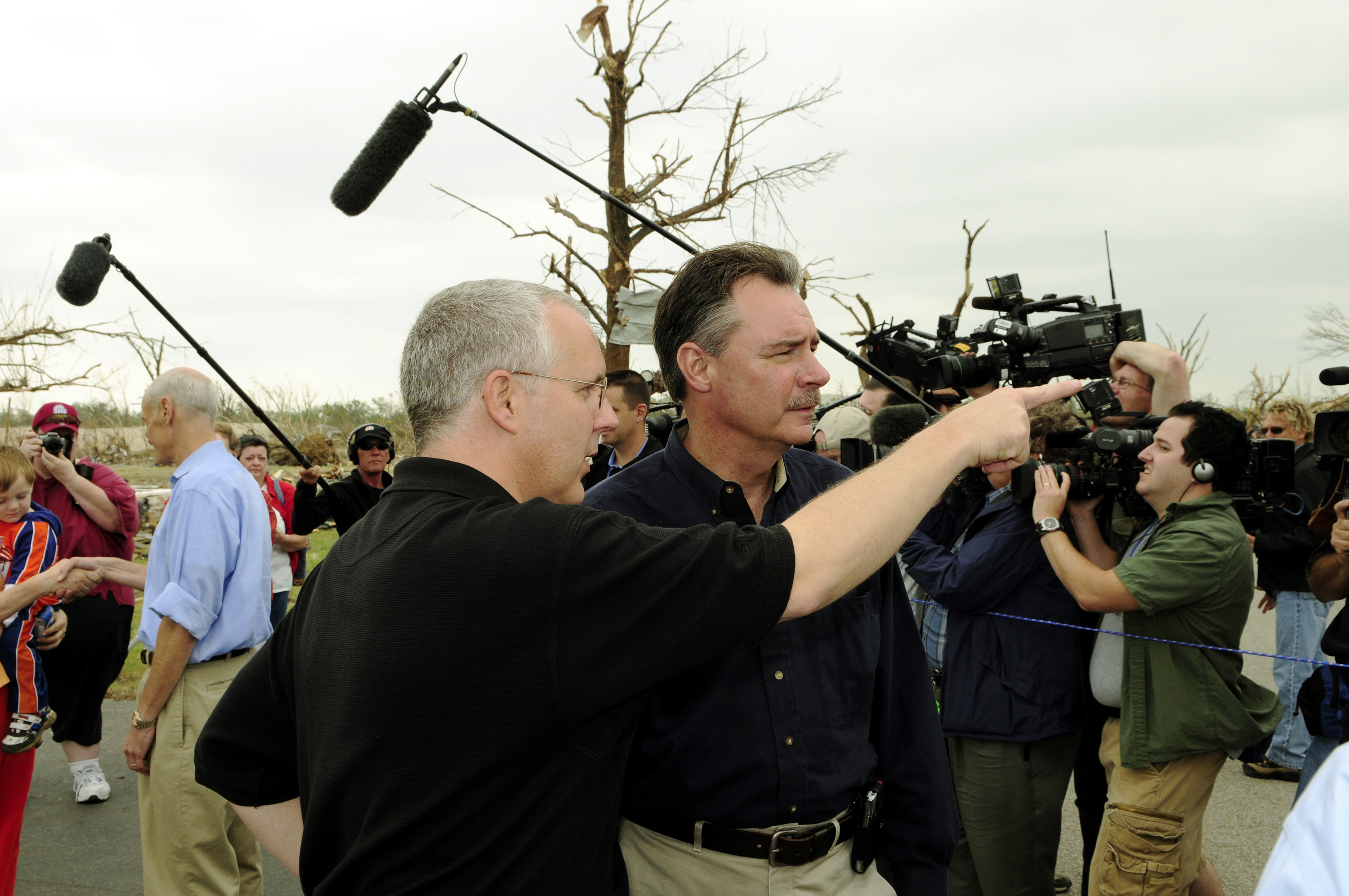
Henry with FEMA Administrator R. David Paulison, 2008

In 2004, he signed a bill into law that set out a total of $2,100 in across-the-board salary increases for state employees, public school teachers and state troopers. He also signed legislation to limit the sale of pseudoephedrine used to make crystal meth.

In 2008, he vetoed an anti-abortion measure which required, among other things, women to get an ultrasound before having an abortion. The veto was overridden and was the first override in Oklahoma since 1994, when Gov. David Walters was in office. That law was struck down by a state district court, but passed again in April 2010, whereupon Henry again vetoed it. His veto was again overridden. However, that same year, Henry signed legislation that would prevent women from getting abortions based on the gender of the fetus, require that only qualified physicians administer mifepristone and protect employees who refuse to participate in abortions.

Despite high job approval ratings and avoidance of controversy, Oklahoma voters approved a term limit holding the governor to a total length of time of eight years in office. The law already provided for a term limit of two consecutive terms for the governor. This effectively prohibited Henry, then 47, from making a comeback attempt at a later date.

=== Oklahoma Supreme Court appointments ===
Governor Henry appointed the following Justices to the Oklahoma Supreme Court:

- James E. Edmondson – 2003
- Steven W. Taylor – 2004
- Tom Colbert – 2004, making Henry the first governor to appoint an African American justice to the Court.
- John F. Reif – 2007
- Doug Combs – 2010
- Noma Gurich – 2010

=== Budget proposals ===
Governor Henry submitted the following budgets to the Oklahoma Legislature: 2004, 2005, 2006, 2007, 2008, 2009, 2010, and 2011.

=== Cabinet ===
The Cabinet of Governor Brad Henry
Office	Name	Term
Governor	Brad Henry	2003–2011
Lieutenant Governor	Mary Fallin	2003–2007
Lieutenant Governor	Jari Askins	2007–2011
Secretary of State	M. Susan Savage	2003–2011
Attorney General	Drew Edmondson	2003–2011
State Auditor and Inspector	Jeff McMahan	2003–2008
State Auditor and Inspector	Steve Burrage	2008–2011
State Treasurer	Robert Butkin	2003–2005
State Treasurer	Scott Meacham	2005–2011
Insurance Commissioner	Carroll Fisher	2003–2005
Insurance Commissioner	Kim Holland	2005–2011
Labor Commissioner	Brenda Reneau	2003–2007
Labor Commissioner	Lloyd Fields	2007–2011
Superintendent of Public Instruction	Sandy Garrett	2003–2011
Secretary of Agriculture	Terry Peach	2003–2011
Secretary of Commerce and Tourism	Kathy Taylor	2003–2006
Secretary of Commerce and Tourism	Natalie Shirley	2006–2011
Secretary of Education	vacant	2003–2011
Secretary of Energy	David Fleischaker	2003–2008
Secretary of Energy	Bobby Wegener	2008–2011
Secretary of the Environment	Miles Tolbert	2003–2008
Secretary of the Environment	J.D. Strong	2008–2011
Secretary of Finance and Revenue	Scott Meacham	2005–2011
Secretary of Health	Tom Adelson	2003–2004
Secretary of Health	Terry Cline	2004–2007
Secretary of Health	Mike Crutcher	2007–2009
Secretary of Health	Terri White	2009–2011
Secretary of Human Resources	Oscar B. Jackson Jr.	2003–2011
Secretary of Human Services	Howard Hendrick	2003–2011
Secretary of the Military	Harry M. Wyatt III	2003–2009
Secretary of the Military	Myles Deering	2009–2011
Secretary of Safety and Security	Bob Ricks	2003
Secretary of Safety and Security	Kevin L. Ward	2004–2011
Secretary of Science and Technology	Joseph W. Alexander	2004–2011
Secretary of Transportation	Phil Tomlinson	2003–2009
Secretary of Transportation	Gary Ridley	2009–2011
Secretary of Veterans Affairs	Norman Lamb	2003–2011

== Post-gubernatorial career ==
Henry was seen as a candidate for President of the University of Central Oklahoma. However, the state's largest newspapers, The Daily Oklahoman and The Tulsa World, both editorialized against the appointment of Henry as UCO president by the UCO Board of Regents, which was appointed by Henry. Another candidate, Don Betz, was named to the position. Henry was considered a likely choice to be Dean of the Oklahoma City University School of Law. However, U.S. Federal Magistrate Valerie Couch was appointed. As governor, Henry appointed 5 members of the Oklahoma Supreme Court and delivered the 2010 commencement address at the OCU School of Law.

In 2013, supporters had asked Henry to run in the 2014 elections against incumbent Republican governor Mary Fallin, but he declined. However, Henry said the term limit initiative voters passed didn't apply to him as he had already been term limited by the State Constitution before the proposition was approved. Henry was considered a contender for the 2014 U.S. Senate Special Election, but ultimately did not run. He would also be sought out for the election for a full term 2 years later, but again, was not a candidate.

On June 8, 2016, Henry joined the law firm Spencer Fane.

== Election results ==
=== 2002 ===
Oklahoma gubernatorial election 2002 results map. Red denotes counties won by Steve Largent, Blue denotes those won by Brad Henry.

Summary of the 2002 Oklahoma gubernatorial election results
Candidates	Party	Votes	%
Brad Henry	Democratic Party	448,143	43.27%
Steve Largent	Republican Party	441,277	42.61%
Gary Richardson	Independent	146,200	14.12%
Total		1,035,620	100.0%
Source: 2002 Election Results

=== 2006 ===
Oklahoma gubernatorial election 2006 results map. Red denotes counties won by Ernest Istook, Blue denotes those won by Brad Henry.

Summary of the November 7, 2006 Oklahoma gubernatorial election results
Candidates	Party	Votes	%
Brad Henry (Incumbent)	Democratic Party	616,033	66.50%
Ernest Istook	Republican Party	310,273	33.50%
Total		926,306	100.0%
Source: 2006 Election Results

Party political offices
Preceded by Laura Boyd	Democratic nominee for Governor of Oklahoma; 2002, 2006	Succeeded by Jari Askins
Political offices
Preceded by Frank Keating	Governor of Oklahoma; 2003–2011	Succeeded by Mary Fallin
U.S. order of precedence (ceremonial)
Preceded by Frank Keating as Former Governor	Order of precedence of the United States	Succeeded by Mary Fallin as Former Governor
