= Law of Oklahoma =

Oklahoma law is based on the Oklahoma Constitution (the state constitution), which defines how the statutes must be passed into law, and defines the limits of authority and basic law that the Oklahoma Statutes must comply with. Oklahoma Statutes are the codified, statutory laws of the state. There are currently has 90 titles though some titles do not currently have any active laws.

Laws are approved by the Oklahoma Legislature and signed into law by the governor of Oklahoma. Certain types of laws are prohibited by the state Constitution, and could be struck down (ruled unconstitutional) by the Oklahoma Supreme Court.

== Oklahoma Statutes ==
- Title 1. Abstracting
- Title 2. Agriculture
- Title 3. Aircraft and Airports
- Title 3A. Amusements and Sports
- Title 4. Animals
- Title 5. Attorneys and the State Bar
- Title 6. Banks and Trust Companies
- Title 7. Blind Persons
- Title 8. Cemeteries
- Title 9. Census
- Title 10. Children
- Title 11. Cities and Towns
- Title 12. Civil Procedure
- Title 12A. Uniform Commercial Code
- Title 13. Common Carriers
- Title 14. Congressional and Legislative Districts
- Title 14A. Consumer Credit Code
- Title 15. Contracts
- Title 16. Conveyances
- Title 17. Corporation Commission
- Title 18. Corporations
- Title 19. Counties and County Officers
- Title 20. Courts
- Title 21. Crimes and Punishments
- Title 22. Criminal Procedure
- Title 23. Damages
- Title 24. Debtor and Creditor
- Title 25. Definitions and General Provisions
- Title 26. Elections
- Title 27. Eminent Domain
- Title 27A. Environment and Natural Resources
- Title 28. Fees
- Title 29. Game and Fish
- Title 30. Guardian and Ward
- Title 31. Homestead and Exemptions
- Title 32. Husband and Wife
- Title 33. Inebriates
- Title 34. Initiative and Referendum
- Title 35. Insane and Feeble Minded Persons
- Title 36. Insurance
- Title 37. Intoxicating Liquors
- Title 38. Jurors
- Title 39. Justices and Constables
- Title 40. Labor
- Title 41. Landlord and Tenant
- Title 42. Liens
- Title 43. Marriage
- Title 43A. Mental Health
- Title 44. Militia
- Title 45. Mines and Mining
- Title 46. Mortgages
- Title 47. Motor Vehicles
- Title 48. Negotiable Instruments
- Title 49. Notaries Public
- Title 50. Nuisances
- Title 51. Officers
- Title 52. Oil and Gas
- Title 53. Oklahoma Historical Societies and Associations
- Title 54. Partnership
- Title 56. Poor Persons
- Title 57. Prisons and Reformatories
- Title 58. Probate Procedure
- Title 59. Professions and Occupations
- Title 60. Property
- Title 61. Public Buildings and Public Works
- Title 62. Public Finance
- Title 63. Public Health and Safety
- Title 64. Public Lands
- Title 65. Public Libraries
- Title 66. Railroads
- Title 67. Records
- Title 68. Revenue and Taxation
- Title 69. Roads, Bridges, and Ferries
- Title 70. Schools
- Title 71. Securities
- Title 72. Soldiers and Sailors
- Title 73. State Capital and Capitol Building
- Title 74. State Government
- Title 74E. Ethics Rules
- Title 75. Statutes and Reports
- Title 76. Torts
- Title 78. Trademarks and Labels
- Title 79. Trusts and Pools
- Title 80. United States
- Title 82. Waters and Water Rights
- Title 83. Weights and Measures
- Title 84. Wills and Succession
- Title 85. Workers' Compensation
- Title 85A. Administrative Workers' Compensation System
