= Oklahoma State Regents for Higher Education =

Higher education governmental agency in Oklahoma, United States

- Great Seal of Oklahoma

Agency overview
- Formed: March 11, 1941; 85 years ago
- Headquarters: 655 Research Parkway Oklahoma City, Oklahoma
- Employees: 324
- Annual budget: $386 million
- Ministers responsible: Nellie Sanders, Secretary of Education; Dennis Casey, Chair of State Regents
- Agency executive: Sean Burrage, Chancellor
- Website: www.okhighered.org

The Oklahoma State Regents for Higher Education is the agency of the government of Oklahoma that serves as the governing body of the Oklahoma State System of Higher Education, which is the largest provider of higher education in the state of Oklahoma. The State System consists of all institutions of higher education in Oklahoma that are supported (wholly or in part) by direct legislative appropriations from the Oklahoma Legislature.

The State Regents are the statewide coordinating board of control for the state's twenty-five colleges and universities, ten constituent agencies, and two higher education programs. The State Regents is a nine-member board, with the members are appointed by the Governor of Oklahoma with approval of the Oklahoma Senate. Each member serves a nine-year term, with one member's term expiring each year, and can be reappointed to continue in service.

The current Chancellor of the Higher Education System is Allison D. Garrett.

Together with the Oklahoma State Department of Education and the Oklahoma Department of Career and Technology Education, the State System forms the core of Oklahoma's public education system.

== History ==
=== Pre-statehood ===
The history of higher education in the State of Oklahoma begins before the days of the Oklahoma Territory (which existed from 1890 to 1907) in Indian Territory, and were started either by Indian tribes or by religious organizations for the benefit of Indian tribes.

the agency's total FY 2017 appropriation of $2.427 billion, 77.1 percent ($1.870 billion) takes the form of state aid funding that goes directly to local school districts through a complex ... State appropriations (36 percent) and tuition and fees (48 percent) funded most spending for Oklahoma higher education in FY 2016. The first higher education institution in the territory is what is now Northeastern State University, which was founded on May 7, 1851, as the Cherokee National Female Seminary. On March 6, 1909, the State Legislature of Oklahoma passed an act providing for the creation and location of Northeastern State Normal School at Tahlequah, Oklahoma (Capital of the Cherokee Nation), and for the purchase form the Cherokee Tribal Government of the Cherokee Female Seminary.

St. Gregory's University was founded in 1875 as Sacred Heart Mission, founded in Atoka, Oklahoma (the oldest Catholic parish in Indian Territory) by the Benedictine monks. In 1876, the mission relocated near Konawa, Oklahoma and became an abbey. Sacred Heart College was founded with the permission of the Vatican in 1877 and later gained approval from the territorial government in 1883. The institution was moved to Shawnee, Oklahoma (near the capital of the Citizen Potawatomi Nation as well as the Seminole Nation) as the Catholic University of Oklahoma in 1910, and in 1922, the name was changed to St. Gregory's College.

Bacone College was founded in 1880 as the Indian University in Muskogee, Oklahoma (Capital of the Creek Nation) by Almon C. Bacone, and is the oldest continuously operated institution of higher education in Oklahoma. The college has strong historic ties to various tribal nations, including the Cherokee Nation and the Muscogee Creek Nation, as well as the American Baptist Churches of America.

What is now the University of Tulsa was founded in Muskogee as the Presbyterian School for Indian Girls in 1882. The institution was rechartered as the Henry Kendall College in 1894 under the auspices of the Presbyterian Women's Board of Home Missions. In 1907 the college moved to its current site in Tulsa, Oklahoma and became the University of Tulsa in 1920.

The first public universities in Oklahoma date back before Oklahoma's statehood in 1907. The first territorial legislature of Oklahoma Territory, in accordance with the Oklahoma Territory Organic Act, enacted laws creating three institutions of higher education in 1890. The United States Congress mandated that the Territory have access to three different types of colleges: a liberal arts and professional education college, an agriculture and mechanical arts college to meet the provisions of the Morrill Act of 1862, and a normal school college

On December 19 of 1890, the first Governor of Oklahoma Territory George Washington Steele signed the bill that created the Oklahoma Territorial University at Norman (now the University of Oklahoma), the institution designated to provide the liberal arts and professional education, as the first university in Oklahoma. Six days later, on Christmas Day, 1890, Governor Steele signed the bills creating the Oklahoma Territorial Agricultural and Mechanical College at Stillwater as a land grant institution (now Oklahoma State University) and the Oklahoma Territorial Normal School at Edmond (now University of Central Oklahoma) to provide training for public school teachers in the new territory.

The Territorial Normal School opened on November 1, 1891. Six weeks later, on December 14, Territorial A&M College opened. The Territorial University would not open until August 1892 with Dr. David Ross Boyd as the university's first president.

Later, the Territorial Legislature established four more higher education institutions: the Colored Agricultural and Normal University at Langston (now Langston University) and the Normal School for Teachers at Alva (now Northwestern Oklahoma State University) in 1897. and the Normal School for Teachers at Weatherford (now Southwestern Oklahoma State University) and the Oklahoma University Preparatory School at Tonkawa (now Northern Oklahoma College) in 1901.

=== Statehood ===
As Oklahoma Territory and Indian Territories moved towards statehood as the State of Oklahoma, talks began to establish public higher education institutions in the former Indian Territory. The former Oklahoma Territory already had seven established public higher education institutions while there were no such public institutions in the Indian Territory. State leaders immediately set out to increase access to the new state's public higher education colleges and universities.

Under the leadership of the first Governor of Oklahoma, Charles N. Haskell, the first Oklahoma Legislature created two collegiate-level schools in the former Indian Territory: the Industrial Institute and College for Girls at Chickasha (now the University of Science and Arts of Oklahoma) and the School of Mines and Metallurgy at Wilburton (now Eastern Oklahoma State College). The Legislature intended for the school at Wilburton to become the eastern duplicate of the now University of Oklahoma at Norman.

Within two years, nine more colleges had been established throughout the state. Although no more state institutions were created for nearly 50 years, the names, functions or governing structures of the public colleges and universities was in almost constant change.

=== Early coordination ===
As the number of institutions grew so did the competition for legislative funding. Combined with considerable political activity throughout institutional governance, many called for a state system to coordinate the various colleges and universities. In early statehood, university presidents (and faculty to a lesser degree) were viewed as political appointments; it would not be uncommon for a new crop of university presidents to be appointed each time a new governor took office.

As early as 1913, the second governor of Oklahoma, Lee Cruce, pleaded with the legislature for consolidation of institutional functions and the abolition of some of the smaller schools.

In 1929, Governor William J. Holloway recommended to that the legislature reduce the number of institutional governing bodies and called for a central coordinating agency. The Legislature passed a bill providing for a board to consist of the Oklahoma State Superintendent of Public Instruction, two members to be appointed by the governor, and the presidents of five state institutions. The two gubernatorial appointees were never named and the ex-officio members never met.

Early in 1933, Governor William H. Murray, by executive order, created a nine-member committee to coordinate public higher education. Soon thereafter, the Legislature passed a bill the statutorily created a fifteen-member central board. Although Governor Murray signed the bill and appointed the board members, the board never received any legislative funding. Despite this, the board still met and adopted a set of guiding principles for the coordinating work of the board. However, by the time Governor Murray left office, the terms of all the board members ended. Governor E.W. Marland, Murry's successor, left the positions until and never made any new appointments during his four-year term of office.

=== State system formed ===
In 1939, new Governor Leon C. Phillips named new members and the coordinating board resumed operations. The board recommended that the board be given constitutional authority to ensure it would continue to function. Working off the board's recommendation, the 1941 Legislature proposed an amendment to the Oklahoma Constitution establishing Article XIII-A. Following legislative approval of the proposed amendment, a special election was held on March 11, 1941, at which the amendment was adopted. The amendment created the Oklahoma State System of Higher Education and the Oklahoma State Regents for Higher Education as the system's governing body.

To maintain academic independence from state politics, the Oklahoma State System of Higher Education was created in 1941 through constitutional amendment (Article XIII-A), governed by the Oklahoma State Regents for Higher Education. The State Regents prescribe academic standards of all higher education in the state (for both public and private institutions). The State Regents also determine functions and courses of study at public colleges and universities, grant degrees, and recommend proposed fees within limits set by the Legislature. In general, the State Regents receive a single higher education appropriation from the legislature and have the constitutional responsibility to allocate those budget items to each Governing Board of Regents or Board of Trustees of a constituent agency. Additional constituent agencies of the State System of Higher Education include:

- Quartz Mountain Resort Arts and Conference Center
- Oklahoma Student Loan Authority and Oklahoma Higher Learning Access trust Funds
- George Nigh Rehabilitation Institute - Okmulgee
- OneNet (in cooperation with the Oklahoma Office of Management and Enterprise Services) Oklahoma state government's telecommunication and information network

While the State Regents are the coordinating board of control for all higher education institutions in the State, governing boards of regents and boards of trustees are responsible for the operation and management of each State System institution or higher education program in Title 70 of Oklahoma Statutes.

Additionally, the Oklahoma Constitution establishes three Governing Boards of Regents to provide governance various institutions of higher education.

== Members of the State Regents ==
As of June, 2022, the current State Regents for Higher Education are:

Name	Profession	Hometown	Term Expires	Office
Jeff W. Hickman	Communications	Fairview	2026	Chairman
Mike Turpen	Attorney	Oklahoma City	2027	Vice Chairman
Steven W. Taylor	Chief Justice (retired)	McAlester	2028	Secretary
Dennis Casey	Business Owner	Morrison	2025	Assistant Secretary
Dustin J. Hilliary	Telecommunications	Lawton	2031	
Ann Holloway	Investments	Ardmore	2024	
Joseph L. Parker Jr.	Business Owner	Tulsa	2023	
Jack Sherry	Real Estate	Holdenville	2029	
Courtney Warmington	Attorney	Edmond	2030	

The current Chancellor of the Oklahoma State System of Higher Education is Allison D. Garrett. The Chancellor is the chief executive officer of the State System and is appointed by the State Regents.

== School Classification ==
The State Regents use a three tier classification system to establish a framework for overarching goals and objectives of the public institutions of higher education. Institutions of higher education can be categorized into one of three classifications:

- Research University: "Also known as a "comprehensive university," a university that grants bachelor's, graduate and professional degrees and offers a wide variety of courses and degree programs. Along with instruction, research institutions also focus on research, extension and public service. Research universities usually have large student bodies and expansive campuses. Oklahoma's two public research universities are Oklahoma State University and the University of Oklahoma." (University of Tulsa, a private institution, is also classified as a Research University.) Basic research, fundamental research (sometimes pure research), is research carried out to increase understanding of fundamental principles, to expand the body of a profession’s knowledge. A professor at a research university almost always has a terminal degree in their field of study, and is expected to bring in at least three times their salary in research grants to fund their endeavors to expand their profession’s body of knowledge. Because of the focus on research, graduate assistants (students working to achieve a terminal degree) often teach undergraduate classes; a form of a teaching apprentice program. At the graduate level, the focus is on typically on educating the student how to think, how to construct and destruct problems, the synthesis of ideas, and the development of new ideas, concepts, and theories.
- Teaching University: including the “Regional Universities” has a primary focus of teaching and a “responsibility for institutional and applied research...” Institutional research is the minimum a university professor needs to do assure they are constantly imparting the leading edge of knowledge to students. Applied research is using some part of the profession's accumulated theories, knowledge, methods, and techniques, for a specific, often for governmental, commercial, or client driven purpose. A professor at a teaching university usually has a terminal degree (but may have a master's degree) and has a primary focus on teaching. In Oklahoma, at least ½ of a professor's time must be spent performing teaching related activities in order to be considered full-time faculty. Applied and Institutional Research is typically funded through budgets and allocated through “release time” – obtaining an adjunct (or part-time instructor) to cover the professor's teaching requirements that are re-allocated to research. A teaching university focuses on Bachelor's and master's degrees, although a few institutions may offer highly specialized terminal professional degrees. An undergraduate student at a Teaching University will typically be taught by a professor (as opposed to a graduate assistant) and have smaller class sizes than a typical undergraduate student at a Research University.
- Community College: A Community College will focus on offering certificate programs and two-year associate degrees aimed at professional focused curriculum. Most colleges provide for open admissions (few, if any, prerequisites need to be met for enrollment.) Some Oklahoma Community Colleges have supplemental funding from an Ad valorem tax district. Community colleges typically focus on teaching students how to be successful in a profession. In general, the State Regents define the following functions for a coummunity college:
  - To provide general education for all students (typically the first two years of a four-year degree; these “general education” courses are transferable between any public higher education institution in the state)
  - To provide education in several basic fields of study for those students who plan to transfer to a university and complete a baccalaureate degree.
  - To provide one- and two-year programs of technical and occupational education to prepare individuals to enter the labor market
  - To provide programs of remedial and developmental education for those whose previous education may not have prepared them for college.
  - To provide both formal and informal programs of study especially designed for adults and out-of-school youth in order to serve the community generally with a continuing education opportunity.
  - To carry out programs of institutional research designed to improve the institution's efficiency and effectiveness of operation
  - To participate in programs of economic development independently or with universities toward the end that the needs of each institution's geographic service area are met.

== Role of the State Regents ==
The State Regents prescribe academic standards of higher education, determine functions and courses of study at state colleges and universities, grant degrees, recommend to the Oklahoma Legislature budget allocations for each college and university, and recommend proposed fees within limits set by the Legislature. The State Regents also manage 27 scholarship and special programs. In addition, in cooperation with the Oklahoma Office of Management and Enterprise Services, the State Regents operate OneNet, the state's research and education network (REN). The regents also oversee the Oklahoma Guaranteed Student Loan Program, which guarantees loans made to students by the private sector.

== Cooperative Alliances ==
The State Regents have a partnership with the Oklahoma Department of Career and Technology Education where students enrolled in certain technical courses at a local technology center can earn transcribed college credit.
