= Oklahoma District Attorneys Council =

District Attorneys Council
- Great Seal of Oklahoma

Agency overview
- Formed: 1976
- Headquarters: 421 NW 13 Street; Oklahoma City, Oklahoma
- Employees: 37 unclassified
- Annual budget: $100 million
- Minister responsible: Tricia Everest, Secretary of Safety and Security
- Agency executive: Kathryn Boyle Brewer, Executive Coordinator
- Website: District Attorneys Council

The Oklahoma District Attorneys Council is an agency of the state of Oklahoma that provides professional organization for the education, training and coordination of technical efforts of all Oklahoma state prosecutors and to maintain and improve prosecutor efficiency and effectiveness in enforcing the laws of the state. The Council distinguishes itself from the District Attorneys Association, a private organization, in order to lobby the legislature, though it is composed of the same members.

The council is composed of five members, one of which is the Attorney General of Oklahoma and the remaining four are sitting District Attorneys. The council is responsible for appointing an Executive Coordinator to act as chief executive officer of the council. The current Executive Coordinator is Kathryn Boyle Brewer.

The council was established in 1976 during the term of Governor of Oklahoma David L. Boren.

== History ==
The District Attorneys Council was created by the Oklahoma Legislature in 1976.

In 2019, Steve Kunzweiler and member of the Council organized a DA breakfast "where they could all come together for the first time ever" to later "feel comfortable to pick up the phone and call one of the district attorneys if they have a question about proposed legislation" that would affect their work.

In 2025, they asked for more money when prosecuting and handling death penalty cases, because reports about past death penalty cases claiming something had gone awry.

== Functions ==
The primary function of the District Attorneys Council is to provide a professional organization for the education, training and coordination of technical efforts of all District Attorneys of the State. The Oklahoma District Attorneys Council assists local DAs by providing financial, personnel, and other administrative services upon request. The council is the administrative agency for the Crime Victims Compensation Board and the state administrative agency for several federal grants.

The Oklahoma District Attorneys Council does not have control over individual district attorneys. Its functions are advisory and administrative support only. The council does not have the power to investigate, stop, or otherwise prevent a district attorney from prosecuting an individual or group.

== Leadership ==
The District Attorneys Council is under the supervision of the Secretary of Safety and Security. Under current Governor of Oklahoma Kevin Stitt, Major General Thomas H. Mancino is serving as the secretary.

=== Council members ===
The council is composed of five members. The members are the Attorney General of Oklahoma, the President of the Oklahoma District Attorneys Association, the President-elect of the Oklahoma District Attorneys Association, one district attorney selected by the Oklahoma Court of Criminal Appeals for a three-year term, and one district attorney selected by the Board of Governors of the Oklahoma Bar Association for a three-year term. A member of the council must vacate their position upon termination of the member's official position as attorney general or district attorney.

As of 2023, the members of the council are:

- Matt Ballard, District Attorney Claremore, Oklahoma - Chair
- Chris Boring, District Attorney Woodward, Oklahoma - Vice Chair
- Greg Mashburn, District Attorney Norman, Oklahoma - Member
- Steve Kunzweiler, District Attorney Tulsa, Oklahoma - Member
- Gentner Drummond, Attorney General, State of Oklahoma - Member
- Jacobi Whatley, Assistant District Attorney - Domestic Violence and Sexual Assault Resource Prosecutor
- Ryan Stephenson, Assistant Executive Coordinator

== Divisions ==
- District Attorneys Council
  - Executive Coordinator
    - Assistant Coordinator
      - Executive Division - serves as direct staff of the Executive Coordinator and to the Council
      - Information Technology Division - provides information to improve information technology services through efficient and effective execution of technological research, acquisition, and testing to local District Attorneys, liaison to the Oklahoma State Bureau of Investigation
      - Finance Division - provides budgeting, purchasing, and payroll service to the Council
      - Federal Grants and Programs Division - serves as state administering agency for all federal grants and programs applied for by the Council
      - Victims Services Division - serves as state administering agency for Oklahoma's Crime Victims Compensation Fund as well as staff to the Crime Victims Compensation Board
      - Training and Outreach Division - this division is responsible for training the District Attorneys, and their staff
      - Uninsured Vehicle Enforcement Diversion (UVED) Program - this division manages the state-wide initiative aimed at reducing the number of uninsured vehicles on Oklahoma roadways.

== Lobbying and controversies ==
=== Lobbying efforts ===
Under the Association, which shares the same address and members as the Council, District attorneys in Oklahoma "lobbied for or against 47 bills from 2015 to 2018, according to a study published June 3 by the University of North Carolina School of Law’s Prosecutor and Politics Project." In 2019, the council's top two executives were "registered as agency liaisons to lobby the Legislature." Senator Greg Treat, in a 2024 press conference, called the separation of the Association and the Council a "creative way to hide open records."

=== Lobbying against other bills ===
In 2024, the council spoke against David Rader's bill, SB 594, which would have changed the sentencing structure for failure to protect cases, where mothers are typically sentenced more excessively compared to the person who actually carried out the abuse. The bill was backed by the ACLU of Oklahoma.

=== Accusations of Corruption ===
In May 2023, Oklahoma representative Kevin McDugle accused the council of applying "pressure across the system to protect their power" and claimed district attorneys are "deeply embedded" in Oklahoma's branches of government in his attempt to help Richard Glossip. The council has also "actively sought to undermine Prater’s successor, Vicki Behenna, the county’s first female elected DA." Prater and the Council knows "that if the courts agree that Glossip’s conviction should be overturned, it will be up to Behenna to decide whether to retry the case."

In December 2023, Representative Justin Humphrey accused DAs of possibly illegally collecting money during supervised probation and called for the attorney general to investigate. The council's chair, Christopher Boring, rebuked Humphrey's claims.

In 2024, House Representative Justin Humphrey accused the Council of fraud for profiting off supervision fees.

In 2024, Oklahoma state Representative Kevin McDugle said he "believes that members of the Oklahoma District Attorneys Council had improper communications with the Oklahoma Pardon and Parole Board prior to Richard Glossip’s clemency hearing in April 2023." District Attorney Jason Hicks criticized AG Drummond for sharing his views on the case. In other communications revealed, district attorneys referred to Drummond as a “douche” and "complained among themselves that the attorney general had turned Glossip’s clemency hearing into a 'circus'" and that Drummond was vying for a run for governor.

== See also ==
- District Attorney
- Oklahoma Pardon and Parole Board
