= Oklahoma Health Care Authority =

Oklahoma state agency

Agency overview
- Formed: July 1, 1993
- Headquarters: 4345 N.Lincoln Blvd. Oklahoma City, Oklahoma
- Employees: 650+
- Annual budget: $14 billion
- Website: https://oklahoma.gov/ohca.html

The Oklahoma Health Care Authority (OHCA) is a state-level governmental agency that administers the federal Medicaid program in Oklahoma (SoonerCare). Created in 1993, the agency is led by a chief executive officer appointed by the governor and a nine-member board, with five members appointed by the governor, two members appointed by the Speaker of the House and two members appointed by the President Pro Tempore of the Senate. In addition to managing the state’s Medicaid program, OHCA’s Employees Group Insurance Division administers the HealthChoice insurance plan for public sector employees.

== Responsibilities ==
SoonerCare

SoonerCare works to improve the health of qualified Oklahomans by ensuring the availability of medically necessary benefits and services. Qualifying Oklahomans include certain low-income children, adults, families, those with disabilities, those being treated for breast or cervical cancer and those seeking family planning services.

SoonerCare provides necessary care and services to more than 1 million Oklahomans. Applicants can check their eligibility and apply for benefits on the OHCA application webpage.

SoonerSelect

SoonerSelect is a healthcare delivery system used to coordinate health and dental care for qualifying SoonerCare members. OHCA partners with contracted entities that provide the same healthcare services currently offered by SoonerCare, although the contracted entities may offer extra benefits to eligible members.

HealthChoice

The HealthChoice insurance plan, funded by the state of Oklahoma, provides group health, dental, life and disability insurance plans for public sector employees. It is administered by OHCA’s Employees Group Insurance Division.

Insure Oklahoma

Insure Oklahoma offers premium assistance to help Oklahoma businesses cover their qualified staff. Businesses must have 250 or fewer employees to qualify (no more than 500 employees for nonprofits). They must also be enrolled or in the process of enrolling in a qualified health plan. The state, the employer and the employee share the premium costs.
