= Oklahoma state budget =

Budget of a U.S. state

The Budget of the State of Oklahoma is the governor's proposal to the Oklahoma Legislature which recommends funding levels to operate the state government for the next fiscal year, beginning July 1. Legislative decisions are governed by rules and legislation regarding the state budget process.

After the Legislature approves an appropriations bill, it is sent to the governor, who may sign it into law, or may veto it. A vetoed bill is sent back to the Legislature, which can pass it into law with a two-thirds majority in each chamber. The Legislature may also combine all or some appropriations bills into an omnibus appropriations bill. In addition, the governor may request and the Legislature may pass supplemental appropriations bills or emergency supplemental appropriations bills.

Several government agencies provide budget data and analysis. These include the Oklahoma Office of State Finance, Oklahoma Tax Commission, the Office of the Oklahoma State Treasurer, and the Office of the Oklahoma State Auditor and Inspector.

== Budget process ==
The budget cycle starts with state agencies developing a detailed outline of financial needs for the next fiscal year. This "budget request" is then reviewed and analyzed by the Office of State Finance in light of overall state responsibilities, goals, objectives and total funds available. Each year by October 1, each state agency must submit their official budget request to the Office of State Finance. Budget requests can be amended once submitted, however. From October through December, the Office of State Finance analyzes each agency's request and develops recommendations to the agency based on the direction of the governor. Beginning in December, the Oklahoma State Board of Equalization begins meetings. On the first Monday in February, the governor must submit a balanced budget to the Legislature based on the Office of State Finance review of budget requests and subsequent recommendations by the Office of State Finance, the governor's cabinet secretaries and policy advisors. Budgeted expenditures can not exceed the amount available for appropriation.

Not more than 45 days nor less than 35 days prior to the convening of each regular session of the Legislature, the State Board of Equalization certifies amounts available for appropriation. A second meeting of the board is held within five days of the monthly apportionment in February. At these two meetings mandated by the Oklahoma Constitution estimates of revenue to each available fund are based on a determination of the revenues to be received by the state under the laws in effect at the time such determination is made. These estimates are based on predictable changes in the economy as well as current law. Once certified, the amount may only be altered if the Legislature passes measures design to increase or reduce revenues. Should the Legislature enact laws that provide additional revenues or a reduction in revenues to these certified funds, the board meets to determine the changes in revenue. Only those changes in revenue resulting from changes in law can be considered at this third meeting.

Once the Legislature convenes in February, both the Oklahoma Senate's Appropriations Committee and the Oklahoma House of Representatives' Appropriations Committee begin meeting to review each agency's budget request. This continues until late-April. In May, the Appropriations Committees determines the agency budgets for the next fiscal year and then pass appropriations bills. By the end of May to early June, the governor evaluates all appropriation bill passed by the Legislature and makes a final decision to approve, veto or line item veto the bills. The current fiscal year ends on June 30 and the recently enacted budget takes effect on July 1.

A state agency, based upon funds appropriated by the Legislature and other funds available to the agency, then develops a Budget Work Program which outlines in detail planned expenditures for the ensuing fiscal year. Work programs are reviewed by OSF and the approved work program serves as a basis for the subsequent appropriations of funds. Budget Work Programs can be revised at any time during the fiscal year if justified and if the revision can be accomplished within various expenditure, full-time-equivalent employee and program expenditure limits.

=== Gubernatorial control ===
In addition to controlling the state agencies and submitting the proposed budget to the Legislature at the beginning of the budget process, the governor also plays a significant role at the end of the budgetary process. Every appropriations bill passed by the Legislature, before it can become law, must be presented to the governor for their approval, as is the case with all other types of bill. However, in addition to simply signing or rejecting, the governor is given the power to veto specific items with appropriation bills and approve the remainder of the bill. Any item so vetoed is void unless both the Senate and the House of Representatives vote to override his veto by two-thirds majorities in both chambers.

=== Legislative control ===
Legislative budgetary control is maintained over the state agencies at the line item level as identified in appropriation acts. Agency budgets may be modified subject to statutory limits and subject to review by the Legislature's Joint Committee on the Budget and Program Oversight. The director of OSF must approve all transfers between line-items up to 25 percent of the line item, unless either the chair or vice chair of the joint committee, in writing, object to the transfer. If further transfers are deemed necessary, if the director, chair and vice chair all agree, an additional 15 percent (total 40 percent) may be transferred. All transfers are subject to review by the joint committee to determine if the transfer tends to effectuate or subvert the intention and objectives of the Legislature.

== Funding sources ==
The three main sources of funding for state government operations are state appropriations, federal funds, and revolving funds. Revolving funds are generated from fees, dedicated financing, and other agency-generated funding.

- Appropriations are annual authority from the Legislature to spend an amount of money for a particular purpose and receive the most attention from the governor, Legislature and other groups as they represents discretionary spending
- Federal funds are grants given by the United States federal government to support specific state services and agencies, with some requiring the state to match the federal funds with state appropriations and with all limit how the money may be used
- Revolving funds are fees and other revenue collected by state agencies that are used to support the activities of the agency that collected them, often limited to specific purposes

Appropriations account for less than half of total state spending. In some agencies, nearly all of their funding comes from appropriations while, in many others, appropriations make up less than half the total spending of the agency (e.g. the Oklahoma Department of Public Safety). Many agencies receive no appropriations at all and they are funded entirely by federal funds (e.g. the Oklahoma Employment Security Commission) or revolving funds (e.g. the Oklahoma State Banking Department).

== Major revenue categories ==
For FY 2011, the state government is projected to collect approximately $5 billion in tax revenue, up 8.29% versus FY2010 revenues of $4.6 billion. Primary receipt categories included:

- Individual income taxes (1.7B or 34%)
- Sales taxes (1.6B or 32%)
- Gross production taxes (434M or 10%)
- Corporate income taxes (172M or 3%)
- Motor Vehicle taxes (145M or 3%)

Other taxes include alcohol, motor vehicle, cigarette and tobacco taxes. Tax revenues have averaged approximately 5.8% to 6.5% of the state's gross domestic product.

== Major expenditure categories ==
For FY 2013, the state government budgeted to spend nearly $6.8 billion on a budget, up 3% versus FY2012 spending of $6.6 billion. Primary expenditure categories include:

- Appropriations by cabinet department: $6.8 billion (+3.2%)
  - $3.4 billion - Education (+0%)
  - $1.3 billion - Health (+8%)
  - $766 million - Human Services (+7%)
  - $665 million - Safety and Security (+0%)
  - $207 million - Transportation (+0%)
  - $109 million - Finance and Revenue (-7%)
  - $84.6 million - Judiciary (+0%)
  - $80.0 million - Commerce and Tourism (+0%)
  - $37.7 million - Agriculture (+7%)
  - $35.7 million - Veterans Affairs (+3%)
  - $32.7 million - Legislature (+7%)
  - $17.8 million - Science and Technology (+0%)
  - $14.8 million - Environment (+13%)
  - $12.1 million - Energy (+13%)
  - $10.7 million - Military (+5%)
  - $8.4 million - Secretary of State (+0%)
  - $2.7 million - Governor and Lieutenant Governor (+8%)
- Numbers have been rounded

== Constitutional Reserve Fund ==
The Oklahoma Constitution mandates the creation of a Constitutional Reserve Fund (often referred to as the "Rainy Day Fund"). All revenues collected by the Oklahoma Tax Commission in excess of the revenue estimate made by the Oklahoma State Board of Equalization are deposited into the fund. This process continues until the fund reaches the constitutional cap of 15% of the prior year's General Revenue Fund. All revenues not necessary to maintain the constitutional cap are deposited into the General Revenue Fund.

The Constitutional Reserve Fund can only be used under the following conditions:

- 3/8 of the fund can be used if General Revenue fails to meet the estimate in the current fiscal year
- 3/8 of the fund can be used if General Revenue is projected to decline from one year to the next
- 1/4 of the fund can be used if there is an emergency declaration by the governor and a 2/3 vote in both the Senate and House of Representatives, or this same 1/4 can be used without the governor’s declaration if there is a 3/4 vote by Senate and House of Representatives.

== See also ==
- Government of Oklahoma
- United States federal budget
