= Oklahoma Legislature =

Legislative branch of the state government of Oklahoma

Coordinates: 35°29′32″N 97°30′12″W

Legislature of the State of Oklahoma
- 60th Oklahoma Legislature
- Seal of Oklahoma

Type
- Type: Bicameral
- Houses: Senate; House of Representatives
- Term limits: 12 year cumulative total, in either or both chambers

History
- New session started: January 3, 2023

Leadership
- Senate President: Matt Pinnell (R) since January 14, 2019
- Senate President pro tempore: Lonnie Paxton (R) since January 7, 2025
- House Speaker: Kyle Hilbert (R) since January 7, 2025

Structure
- Seats: 149; 48 Senate; 101 House
- Senate political groups: Republican (40); Democratic (8)
- House political groups: Republican (81); Democratic (20)
- Authority: Article V, Oklahoma Constitution
- Salary: $38,400

Elections
- Last Senate election: 2024 Oklahoma Senate election
- Last House election: 2024 Oklahoma House of Representatives election
- Next Senate election: 2026 Oklahoma Senate election
- Next House election: 2026 Oklahoma House of Representatives election

Meeting place
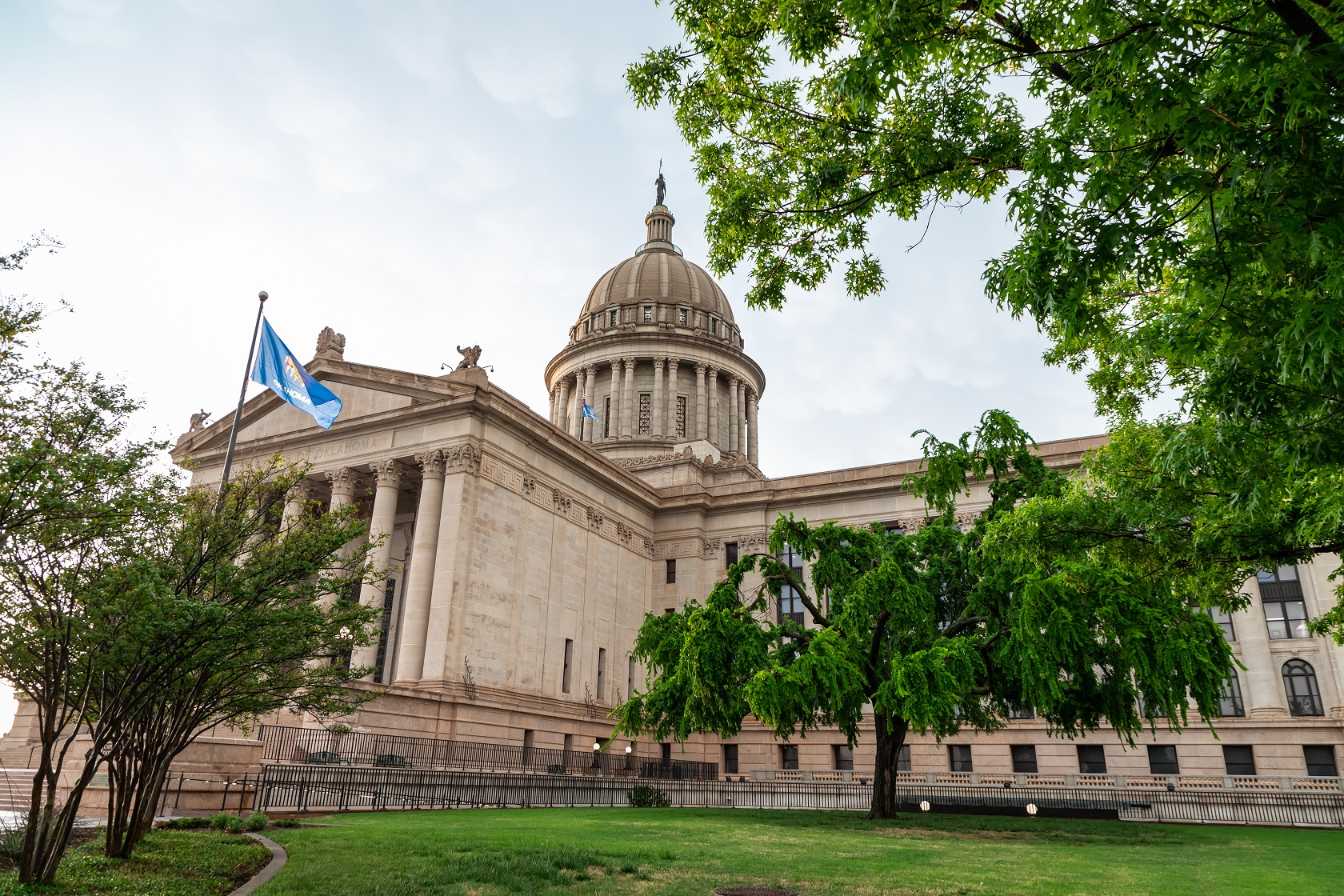
- Oklahoma State Capitol; Oklahoma City

Website
- oklegislature.gov

The Legislature of the State of Oklahoma is the state legislative branch of the U.S. state of Oklahoma. The Oklahoma House of Representatives and Oklahoma Senate are the two houses that make up the bicameral state legislature. There are 101 state representatives, each serving a two-year term, and 48 state senators, who serve four-year terms that are staggered so only half of the Oklahoma Senate districts are eligible in each election cycle. Legislators are elected directly by the people from single member districts of equal population. The Oklahoma Legislature meets annually in the Oklahoma State Capitol in Oklahoma City.

The Oklahoma Constitution vests all legislative powers of the state government in the state legislature, which exercises legislative power by enacting Oklahoma law. The legislature may legislate on any subject and has certain "necessary and proper" powers as may be required for carrying into effect the provisions of the Oklahoma Constitution. The powers of the legislature are only limited by the powers reserved to the people, namely initiative and referendum.

The Oklahoma Senate and the Oklahoma House of Representatives are co-equal houses, but each chamber has exclusive powers. The Oklahoma Senate's advice and consent is required for gubernatorial appointments to high-level executive positions. Bills for raising revenue may only originate in the Oklahoma House of Representatives. Bills approved by the legislature must be sent to the Governor of Oklahoma for approval.

== History ==
=== Early years ===
Prior to 1907 statehood, Oklahoma Territory had the Oklahoma Territorial Legislature that met in Guthrie, Oklahoma. Upon statehood, the Oklahoma Constitution established the Oklahoma Legislature. The 1st Oklahoma Legislature met in the Guthrie City Hall Building and elected William H. Murray as the first Speaker of the Oklahoma House of Representatives. The first three staff members appointed by Murray were a Union veteran, a Confederate veteran, and an African-American man, Jim Noble. The 2nd Oklahoma Legislature included Oklahoma's first black member, A. C. Hamlin, but passed legislation that made it nearly impossible for African-Americans to seek elective office, which limited him to one term.

The meeting place of the Oklahoma Legislature was moved to Oklahoma City in 1910. The Democratic Party held the majority of seats in the legislature until the Ninth Legislature from 1921–1922, when a Republican Party majority took over.

The 1921 session was also notable because it included Oklahoma's first female state legislators, Representative Bessie McColgin and Senator Lamar Loomey. This occurred shortly after women earned the right to vote in Oklahoma in 1918 through a constitutional amendment approved by voters.

Legislators voted in 1923 to impeach Governor Jack C. Walton for trying to block the legislature from holding special session and administrative practices that included payroll padding, pardons, removal of college administrators, and a large increase in the governor's salary.

Governor Henry S. Johnston became the second governor to be impeached by legislators, with members of the Oklahoma House of Representatives voting eleven articles of impeachment against him, which ultimately led to his expulsion from office.

=== 1930s-Present ===
In the 1930s, traditionally Republican counties shifted heavily towards Democrats, giving Democrats a large majority in the Legislature. Bipartisan opposition to deficit spending in the late 1930s led to a 1941 constitutional amendment requiring legislators to pass a balanced budget.

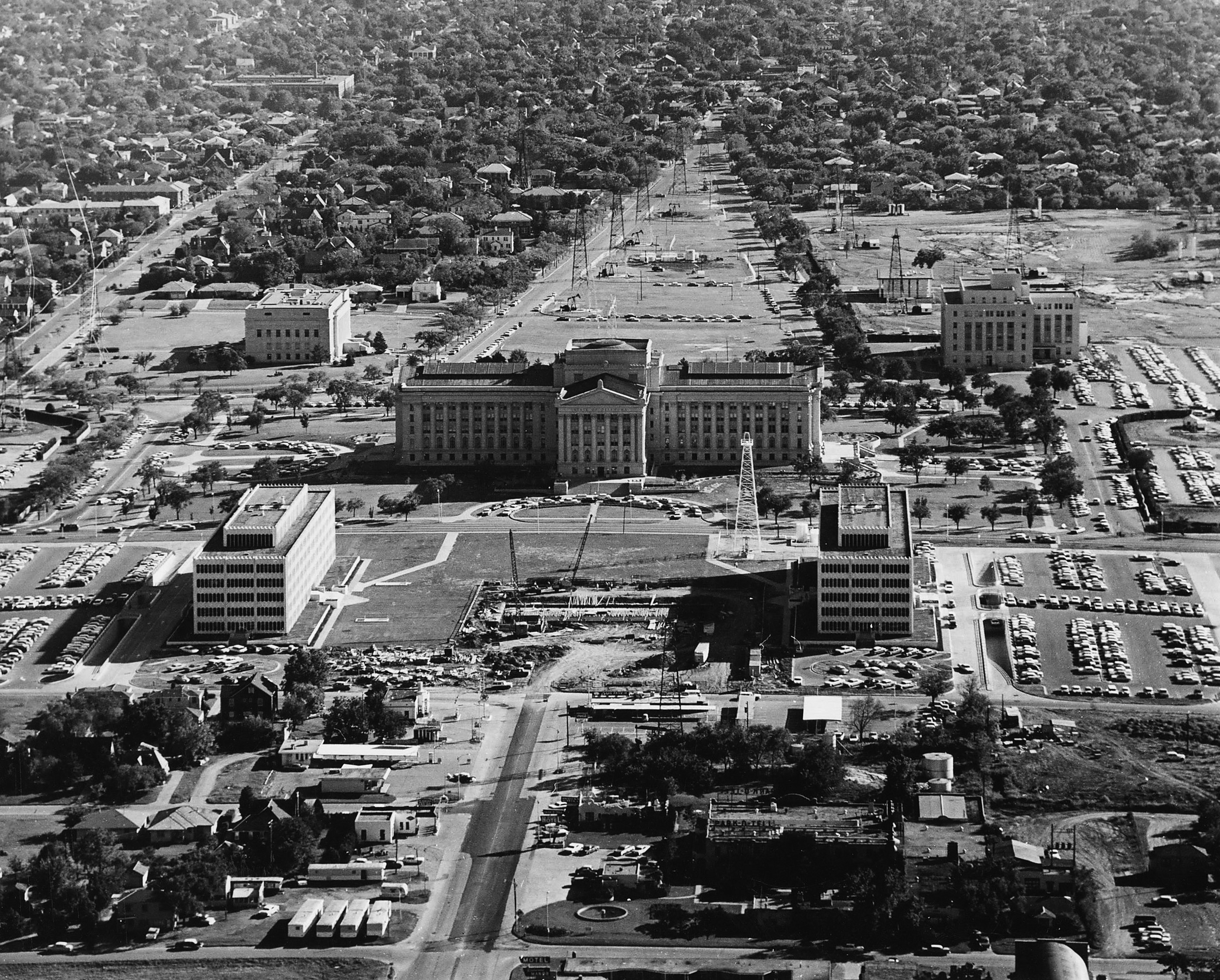
Oklahoma State Capitol in 1963 looking south.

In 1964, three black men, Archibald Hill, E. Melvin Porter, and Curtis Lawson, were elected to the Oklahoma Legislature, the first since A. C. Hamlin left office in 1910.

In 1966, voters approved a ballot question that set up annual 90-day legislative sessions. In 1989 another ballot question further limited session by designating the sine die adjournment day, or last day of session, as the last Friday in May. Combined with the 90-day requirement, this moved the session start day to February, leaving the original start day in January as an organizational day.

Beginning in the 1960s, the Republican party made gains in voter registration and state legislative seats. By 1990, the party counted about a third of voters by registration and had similar representation in the Legislature.

In 2010, Republicans gained a large majority of 32 seats in the Oklahoma Senate and 70 seats in the Oklahoma House of Representatives.

Currently, Republicans have a supermajority in both chambers (81 of 101 seats in the House and 40 of 48 seats in the Senate).

== Qualifications ==
To serve in the Oklahoma Senate, an individual must be at least 25 years of age, and to serve in the Oklahoma House of Representatives, an individual must be at least 21 years of age. State legislators must also be qualified electors and residents in the district they represent during their time in office. To file as a candidate for legislative office, a person must have been a registered voter and a resident residing within the district for at least six months immediately preceding the filing period prescribed by law.

=== Restrictions ===
The Oklahoma Constitution prohibits state legislators from also serving as another officer of the United States or Oklahoma state government. A felony conviction also disqualifies election to the Oklahoma Legislature.

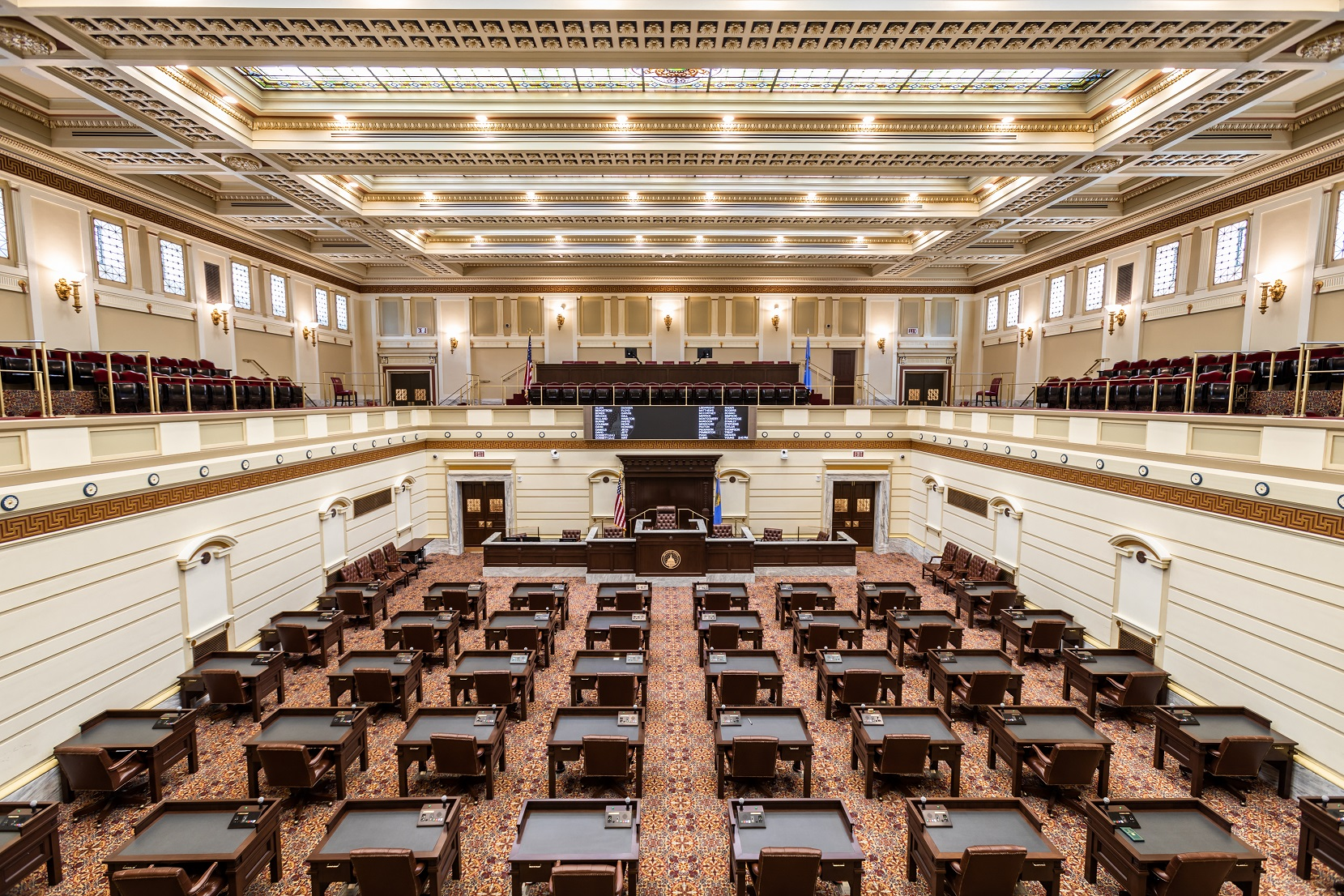
The State Senate Chamber

A constitutional amendment approved by voters implemented term limits for the Legislature. Legislators are limited to a total of 12 years in both chambers. The 12-year term limit is a cumulative term limit of service in either chamber, consecutive or non-consecutive. The 12-year limit does not include any service prior to adoption of the amendment. In addition, the limit does not include those years of an unexpired term served by a member elected or appointed to fill a vacancy in office, but no member who has completed 12 years in office is thereafter eligible to serve an unexpired term.

The Oklahoma Legislature is constitutionally required to enact laws barring conflicts of interest for its members. The Oklahoma Ethics Commission currently makes recommendations to state legislators regarding ethical restrictions.

In the event of a vacancy in the state legislature, the governor issues writs of election to fill such vacancies.

== Membership ==
The House of Representatives consists of 101 members, representing single-member districts that are drawn to reflect equal populations.

Until the U.S. Supreme Court's 1964 ruling in the case of Reynolds v. Sims, each of Oklahoma's 77 counties was guaranteed at least one seat in the State House of Representatives. Now though, the less-populated rural counties form multi-county districts. House District 61, for example, includes the entirety of Cimarron, Texas, Beaver and Harper counties as well as parts of the counties of Ellis and Woodward.

The Senate consists of 48 members, representing single-member districts that are drawn to reflect equal populations.

== Current party composition ==
=== Senate ===
↓
40	8
Republican	Democratic

Affiliation	Party (Shading indicates majority caucus)		Total
Affiliation	Republican	Democratic	Total
End of 59th Legislature	40	8	48
Beginning of 60th Legislature	40	8	48
Latest voting share	83%	17%	

=== House ===
↓
81	20
Republican	Democratic

Affiliation	Party (Shading indicates majority caucus)		Total
Affiliation	Republican	Democratic	Total
End of 59th Legislature	81	20	101
Beginning of 60th Legislature	81	20	101
Latest voting share	80%	20%	

== Officers ==
=== House officers ===
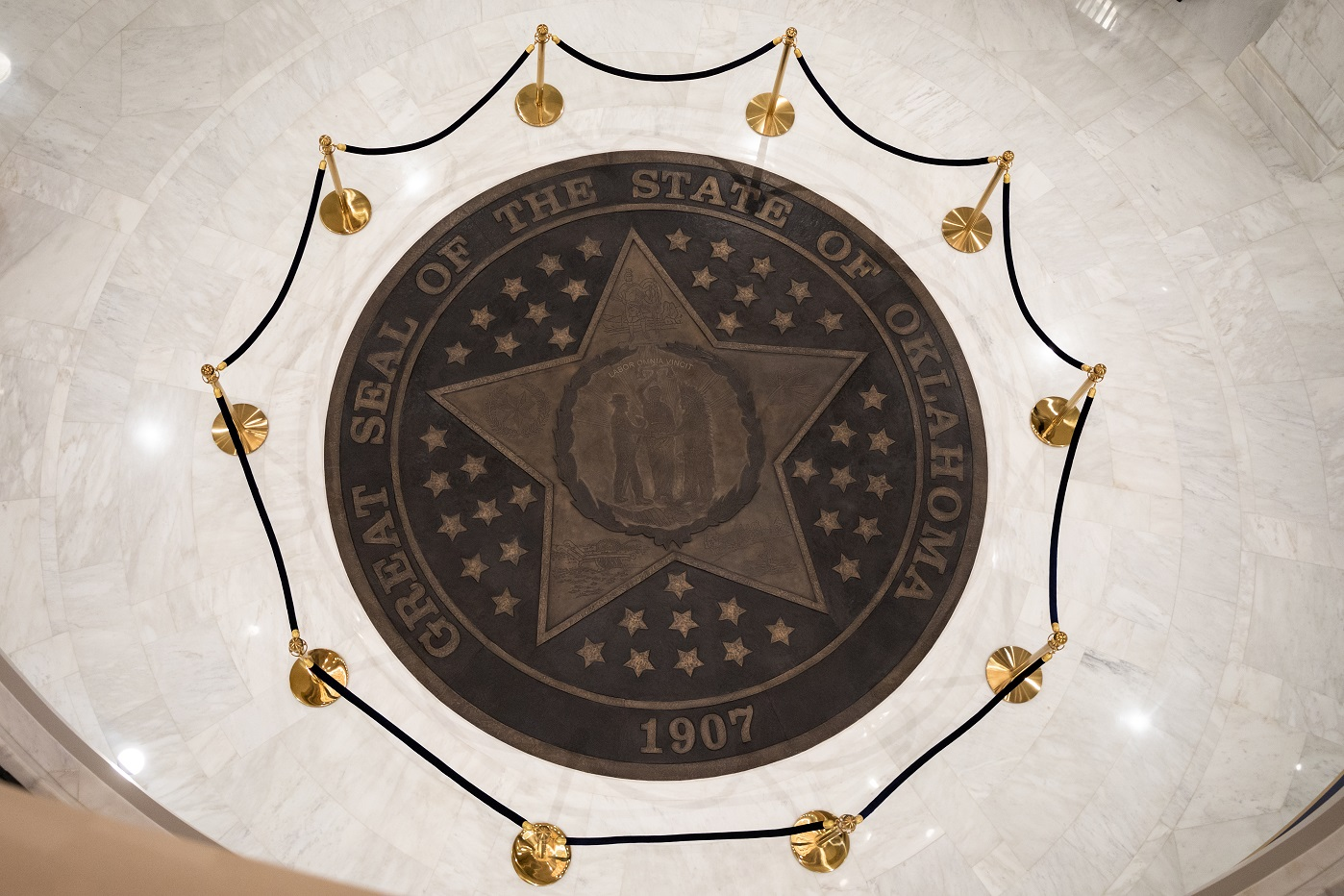
First floor rotunda of the Oklahoma State Capitol

The political party with a majority of seats in the Oklahoma House of Representatives is known as the majority party; the next-largest party is the minority party. The Speaker of the Oklahoma House of Representatives is elected by a majority of members of the Oklahoma House of Representatives and is the nominee elected by the majority party caucus, unless a coalition of members of both political parties chooses a coalition candidate. Members of the minority party elect a caucus leader known as the minority leader. The speaker appoints committee chairs and other leadership roles; the minority leader appoints corresponding minority party roles such as "ranking members" of committees.

The Oklahoma Constitution does not specify the duties and powers of the Speaker of the Oklahoma House of Representatives. They are instead regulated by the rules and customs of the house. Under Section 6 of Article VI of the Oklahoma Constitution, the speaker is third in line behind the lieutenant governor and president pro tempore of the state senate to succeed the governor.

The speaker has a role both as a leader of the House and the leader of the majority party. They are the presiding officer of the House, but may appoint another member to serve as the presiding officer in their absence. The presiding officer sits in a chair in the front of the House chamber. The powers of the presiding officer are extensive; one important power is that of controlling the order in which members of the House speak. No member may make a speech or a motion unless they have first been recognized by the presiding officer. The presiding officer may rule on any "point of order" (a member's objection that a rule has been breached), but the decision is subject to appeal to the whole House.

The speaker is the chair of their party's steering committee, which chooses the chairperson of standing committees. The speaker determines which committees consider bills and appoints members of committees. The speaker is also an ex officio voting member on committees. Under the speaker is a speaker pro tempore who assumes the duties of the speaker in their absence. The speaker and the speaker pro tempore are also ex officio voting members on committees.

Each party elects a floor leader, who is known as the majority leader or minority leader. While the minority leader is the full leader of their party, the same is not true of the majority leader. Instead, the speaker is the head of the majority party; the majority leader is only the second-highest official. Each party also elect whips, who works to ensure that their party's members vote as the party leadership desires.

=== Senate officers ===
The political party with a majority of seats is known as the majority party; if two or more parties in opposition are tied, the lieutenant governor's affiliation determines which is the majority party in the Oklahoma Senate. The next-largest party is known as the minority party. The president pro tem, floor leader and committee chairs represent the majority party; they have counterparts in the minority party: the minority leader and ranking members of committees.

The Oklahoma Constitution provides that the lieutenant governor serves as the President of the Senate and holds a vote which can only be cast to break a tie. By convention, the lieutenant governor only attends important ceremonial occasions like the swearing-in of new senators or when his vote is needed to break a tie. The constitution also authorizes state senators to elect a President Pro Tempore of the Oklahoma Senate to preside in the lieutenant governor's absence. The president pro tempore is second in line behind the lieutenant governor to succeed the governor. The president pro tempore is the leader of the senate and serves as leader of the majority party. The president pro tempore is an ex officio voting member of state senate committees.

The presiding officer sits in a chair in the front of the Oklahoma Senate chamber. The presiding officer acts as the Oklahoma Senate's mouthpiece, performs duties such as announcing the results of vote, and controls debates by calling on members to speak. The rules of the Senate requires the presiding officer to recognize the first state senator who rises. The presiding officer may rule on any "point of order" (a senator's objection that a rule has been breached), but the decision is subject to appeal to the full membership.

Each party elects a senator to serve as floor leader. The majority floor leader is an ex officio voting member of state senate committees and sets the schedule of what bills will be heard on the chamber floor. Each party also elect whips to assist the leader.

== Powers ==
Section 1 of Article V of the Oklahoma Constitution sets forth the powers of the Legislature. The state's legislative authority is vested within the state legislature as well as other powers. The most important among these powers are the powers to levy and collect taxes, borrow money, and to raise and maintain the militia of the state. The Oklahoma Legislature is authorized to pass laws as they are necessary for carrying into effect the Oklahoma Constitution. The legislature's power to legislate is broad, except where the constitution limits that authority or reserves it to the people of Oklahoma.

The returns of every election for elective state officers go to the Secretary of State and then to the Speaker of the Oklahoma House of Representatives. Immediately after the organization of the House, he must open and publish the information in the presence of a majority of each branch of the Legislature, who for that purpose assemble in House chamber. The individuals with the highest number of votes for each seat are then declared duly elected. In the event of a tie, the legislature holds the power to break deadlocks. If two or more candidates have an equal number of votes, the legislature may elect one of them to office by means of a joint ballot.

The non-legislative functions of the Oklahoma Legislature include the power to establish a state printing plant and provide for the election or appointment of a state printer; the power to establish a State Geological and Economic Survey; and the power to create a Board of Health, Board of Dentistry, Board of Pharmacy, and Pure Food Commission.

The Legislature must every 10 years, beginning in 1907 (the date of Oklahoma entrance to the Union), make, revise, digest, and announce the laws of Oklahoma. The Legislature shall define what is an unlawful combination, monopoly, trust, act, or agreement, in restraint of trade, and enact laws to punish persons engaged in any unlawful combination, monopoly, trust, act, or agreement, in restraint of trade.

Section 46 through 53 of Article V of the Oklahoma Constitution places certain limits on the authority and powers of the Legislature. For instance, the Legislature may not meddle in the affairs of local government in the realm of day-to-day business, such as street lay out or school districts. Legislators may not appropriate public money for a Bureau of Immigration in Oklahoma, nor exempt property in Oklahoma from taxation except as granted by the state constitution. The Legislature may not pass laws granting exclusive rights, privileges, or immunities.

== Legislative procedure ==
=== Term ===
Legislatures are identified by consecutive numbers and correspond with the election of the members of the Oklahoma House of Representatives. Terms have two sessions; the first takes place in the year immediately following the election and the second takes place the next year.

Under the Oklahoma Constitution, legislative sessions must begin at noon on the first Monday in February of every odd-numbered year, cannot exceed one hundred and sixty days, and must be finally adjourned by no later than five o'clock p.m. on the last Friday in May of each year. The first session cannot exceed 160 days. In odd numbered years following an election, the legislature must meet on the first Tuesday after the first Monday in January for the sole purpose of determining the outcome of the statewide elections. This meeting must begin at noon and must be adjourned by five o'clock p.m. on the same day.

At the beginning of each new term, the entire House of Representatives and one-half of the Senate (those who were chosen in the previous election) are sworn in. The House of Representatives also elects a Speaker to preside over debates. The President pro tempore of the Senate, by contrast, holds office continuously; normally, a new President pro tempore is only elected if the previous one retires, or if there is a change in the majority party.

The Oklahoma Constitution forbids either house adjourning for more than three days, without the consent of the other house. The provision was intended to prevent one house from thwarting legislative business simply by refusing to meet. To avoid obtaining consent during long recesses, the House or Senate may sometimes hold pro forma meetings, sometimes only minutes long, every three days. The Constitution prevents the Legislature from meeting any place outside the Oklahoma Capitol. However, the governor is empowered to convoke the legislature at or adjourn it to another place, when, in his opinion, the public safety or welfare, or the safety or health of the members require it. However, such a change or adjournment requires consent by a two-thirds vote of all the members elected to each branch.

The Legislature may be called into special session by a written call for such purposes as may be specifically set out in the call, signed by two-thirds of the members of the Senate and two-thirds of the members of the House of Representatives when it is filed with the President Pro Tempore of the Senate and the Speaker of the House of Representatives, who shall issue jointly an order for the convening of the special session. However, the Legislature may not prevent the calling of a special session by the governor.

In cases of a disagreement between the two houses of the Legislature, at a regular or special session, with respect to the time of adjournment, the governor may adjourn them to such time as deemed proper, not beyond the day of the next stated meeting of the Legislature. The consent of both bodies is required for the Legislature's final adjournment, or sine die, at the end of each legislative session. If the two houses cannot agree on a date, the state constitution permits the governor to settle the dispute.

=== Bills and resolutions ===
A proposal may be introduced in the legislature as a bill, a joint resolution, a concurrent resolution, or a simple resolution. Legislative proposals are introduced as bills or joint resolutions. Joint resolutions are the normal method used to propose a constitutional amendment. Concurrent resolutions passed by both houses and simple resolutions passed by only one house do not have the force of law. Instead, they serve to express the opinion of the Legislature, or either house thereof, or to regulate procedure.

Bills and other proposals may be introduced by members of either house. The exception is "bills for raising Revenue" that must originate in the Oklahoma House of Representatives, per Article V, Section 33A of the Oklahoma Constitution. The Oklahoma Senate, though, retains the power to amend or reject them.

Bills go through multiple stages in each house. The first stage involves consideration by a standing committee, which has jurisdiction over a particular subject matter, such as agriculture or appropriations. The number of committees, their subject areas, their chairs and membership, and the bills assigned to them are designated by the Speaker of the Oklahoma House of Representatives in the House and the President Pro Tempore of the Oklahoma Senate in the Senate. Alternatively, bills may be sent to select committees. Each standing and select committee is led by a chairman (who belongs to the majority party) and a ranking member (who belongs to the minority party). Committees are permitted to hold hearings and collect evidence when considering bills. They may also amend the bill, but the full house holds the power to accept or reject committee amendments. After considering and debating a measure, the committee votes on whether it wishes to report the measure to the full house.

A decision not to report a bill amounts to a rejection of the proposal. Both houses provide for procedures under which the committee can be bypassed or overruled, but the practice is uncommon. If reported by the committee, the bill reaches the floor of the full house. The house may debate and amend the bill; the precise procedures used by the House of Representatives and the Senate differ. A final vote on the bill follows.

Once a bill is approved by one house, it is sent to the other, which may pass, reject, or amend it. In order for the bill to become law, both houses must agree to identical versions of the bill. If the second house amends the bill, then the differences between the two versions must be reconciled in a conference committee, an ad hoc committee that includes both senators and representatives. In many cases, conference committees have introduced substantial changes to bills and added un-requested spending, significantly departing from both the House and Senate versions.

After passage by both houses, a bill is submitted to the Governor of Oklahoma who may choose to sign the bill, thereby making it law, or veto it, returning it to the Legislature with his objections. In such a case, the bill only becomes law if each house of the Legislature votes to override the veto with a two-thirds majority. Finally, the Governor may choose to take no action, neither signing nor vetoing the bill. In such a case, the Constitution states that the bill automatically becomes law after five days (excluding Sundays). However, if the Legislature adjourns (ends a legislative session) during the five-day period, then the bill does not become law. Thus, the Governor may veto legislation passed at the end of a legislative session simply by ignoring it; the maneuver is known as a pocket veto, and cannot be overridden by the adjourned Legislature. No bill may become a law after the final adjournment of the Legislature unless approved by the governor within fifteen days after such adjournment.

=== Quorum and voting ===
The Oklahoma Constitution specifies that a majority of members constitutes a quorum to do business in each house. The rules of each house provide that a quorum is assumed to be present unless a quorum call demonstrates the contrary. Thus, if no quorum call is requested, debates continue even if a majority is not present.

Both houses use voice voting to decide most matters; members shout out "aye" or "no", and the presiding officer announces the result. The Oklahoma Constitution, however, requires a recorded vote on the demand of one-fifth of the members present. If the result of the voice vote is unclear, or if the matter is controversial, a recorded vote usually ensues. The Senate uses roll call votes; a clerk calls out the names of all the senators, each senator stating "aye" or "no" when his name is announced. The House reserves roll call votes for the most formal matters; normally, members vote by electronic device. In the case of a tie, the motion in question fails. In the Oklahoma Senate, the lieutenant governor may cast the tiebreaking vote.

== Privileges ==
State legislators enjoy the privilege of being free from arrest for criminal charges, except for treason, felony, and breach of the peace. This immunity applies to members "during their Attendance at the Session of their respective Houses, and in going to and returning from the same." The term "arrest" has been interpreted broadly, and includes any detention or delay in the course of law enforcement, including court summons and subpoenas. The rules of the House very strictly guard this privilege; a member may not waive the privilege on his own, but must seek the permission of the whole house to do so. Senate rules, on the other hand, are less strict, and permit individual senators to waive the privilege as they see fit.

As of 2006 rank and file state legislators received a salary of $38,400. The President Pro Tempore of the State Senate and the Speaker of the House of Representatives are paid an additional $17,932 annually. The appropriations committee chairmen, majority floor leaders and the minority floor leaders of each house are paid an additional $12,364 per year.

== Board of Legislative Compensation ==
The Board of Legislative Compensation decides the amount of compensation paid to state legislators. The board is composed of five members appointed by the Governor of Oklahoma, two members appointed by the President pro tempore of the Oklahoma Senate, and two members appointed by the Speaker of the Oklahoma House of Representatives. The members appointed by the governor must be from religious organizations, communications media, nonstate-supported educational institutions, labor organizations, and retail business. The members appointed by the president pro tempore must be from agricultural and civic organization backgrounds and the members appointed by the speaker must have manufacturing or professional backgrounds.

State legislators are prohibited from serving on the board. In addition to the nine voting members, the chair of the Oklahoma Tax Commission and the director of the Oklahoma Office of State Finance serve as ex officio nonvoting members of the board. The chair of the board is designated by the governor. The members of the board serve without compensation, but do receive travel and subsistence expense reimbursements.

Every two years, the board reviews the compensation paid to state legislators and is empowered to change the compensation. Such a change becomes effective on the fifteenth day following the succeeding general election.

== Notable past members ==
- Mary Fallin, 27th Governor of Oklahoma, former U.S. Congresswoman
- Ken A. Miller, former Oklahoma treasurer
- Glen D. Johnson Jr., former Chancellor of Higher Education
- Brad Henry, 26th governor of Oklahoma
- Frank Keating, 25th governor of Oklahoma
- Henry Bellmon, 18th and 23rd governor of Oklahoma
- George Nigh, 17th and 22nd governor of Oklahoma
- David L. Boren, 21st governor of Oklahoma and former U.S. senator
- Dan Boren, former U.S. Congressman
- Ernest Istook, former U.S. Congressman
- Jari Askins, 15th Oklahoma lieutenant governor
- John Jarman, former Congressman
- Clem McSpadden, former Congressman
- James C. Nance, Oklahoma community newspaper chain publisher and former Speaker of the Oklahoma House of Representatives, President pro tempore of the Oklahoma Senate and member Uniform Law Commission
- Raymond D. Gary, 15th governor of Oklahoma
- Leon C. Phillips, 11th governor of Oklahoma
- William H. Murray, 9th governor of Oklahoma
- William J. Holloway, 8th governor of Oklahoma
- Henry S. Johnston, 7th governor of Oklahoma
- John Newbold Camp, former U.S. Congressman
- Victor Wickersham, former U.S. Congressman
- Glen D. Johnson, former U.S. Congressman
- Benjamin F. Harrison, former Secretary of State
- Houston B. Teehee, Oklahoma Supreme Court Commissioner
- A. C. Hamlin, first African-American in Oklahoma Legislature
- T.W. Shannon, first African-American Speaker of the House
- William A. Durant, first Native American Speaker of the House
- Enoch Kelly Haney, former Seminole Nation chief
- Hollis E. Roberts, former Choctaw Nation chief
- Jimmy Belvin, longest-serving Choctaw Nation chief
- Lisa Johnson Billy, speaker of the Chickasaw Tribal Legislature
