= List of Oklahoma state prisons =

This is a list of state prisons in Oklahoma. It does not include federal prisons or county jails located in the state of Oklahoma.

== State prisons ==
- Charles E. Johnson Correctional Center
- Dick Conner Correctional Center
- Dr. Eddie Warrior Correctional Center (inmate capacity 783)
- Howard McLeod Correctional Center (inmate capacity 616)
- Jackie Brannon Correctional Center (inmate capacity 737)
- James Crabtree Correctional Center
- Jess Dunn Correctional Center (inmate capacity 1129)
- Jim E. Hamilton Correctional Center (inmate capacity 680)
- John Lilley Correctional Center (inmate capacity 820)
- Joseph Harp Correctional Center
- Lexington Assessment and Reception Center
- Mabel Bassett Correctional Center
- Mack Alford Correctional Center
- North Fork Correctional Facility (formerly managed by CoreCivic)
- Northeast Oklahoma Correctional Center (inmate capacity 501)
- North Fork Correctional Center
- Oklahoma State Penitentiary
- William S. Key Correctional Center
- Clara Waters Community Corrections Center
- Enid Community Corrections Center
- Kate Barnard Community Corrections Center (inmate capacity 260), closed in 2021
- Lawton Community Corrections Center
- Oklahoma City Community Corrections Center
- Union City Community Corrections Center

== Private prisons ==
- Cimarron Correctional Facility- CoreCivic
- Davis Correctional Facility- CoreCivic
- Lawton Correctional Facility- GEO
- Diamondback Correctional Facility- CoreCivic (closed)
- Great Plains Correctional Facility- GEO (closed)

== Work Center ==
Oklahoma State Reformatory Work Center l
