= Kevin L. Ward =

American police officer & politician (born 1963)

Kevin Ward

Oklahoma Secretary of Safety and Security
- In office 2004–2011
- Governor: Brad Henry
- Preceded by: Bob Ricks
- Succeeded by: Michael C. Thompson

Oklahoma Commissioner of Public Safety
- In office 2004–2011
- Governor: Brad Henry
- Preceded by: Bob Ricks
- Succeeded by: Michael C. Thompson

Personal details
- Born: 1963 (age 62–63) Bethany, Oklahoma
- Spouse: Renee
- Children: Matthew and Mark
- Occupation: State Trooper
- Website: Oklahoma Department of Public Safety

Captain Kevin Ward, OHP (born 1963) is an American police officer and politician from the U.S. state of Oklahoma. Ward previously served as the Oklahoma Secretary of Safety and Security, having been appointed by Governor of Oklahoma Brad Henry in 2004 and serving until 2011. Ward served concurrently as Oklahoma Commissioner of Public Safety.

== Education and early career ==
Ward was born in Bethany, Oklahoma. He graduated from Putnam City West High School and the University of Central Oklahoma in Edmond, Oklahoma.

=== Oklahoma Highway Patrol service ===
Ward began his law enforcement career in 1979 at the Bethany, Oklahoma Police Department. He joined the Department of Public Safety in 1980 serving on the Governor's Mansion Security before his appointment the Oklahoma Highway Patrol in 1985. Upon joining OHP, Ward was assigned to the El Reno, Oklahoma, detachment of Troop A, which is responsible for patrolling the Oklahoma City Metropolitan Area. He would continue in that position until 1990 when he was promoted to second lieutenant and became the head of the Executive Security Division, which is responsible for providing security for the Governor of Oklahoma, the Lieutenant Governor of Oklahoma, and their immediate families.

In 1994, Ward attended the FBI National Academy in Quantico, Virginia. Upon his return, Ward was reassigned back to OHP Troop A to become the supervisor of state troopers in Lincoln and Oklahoma Counties. In August 1996, Ward was assigned to the Office of the Commissioner of Public Safety and promoted to rank of first lieutenant. As first lieutenant, Ward became the chief liaison for the Department to the Oklahoma Legislature. He was promoted to the rank of captain in September 1998 and continued to serve as the chief legislative liaison.

On June 30, 2000, Cabinet Secretary and DPS Commissioner Bob Ricks appointed Ward as Assistant Commissioner of the Department of Public Safety, the Department's second highest position. Ward would continue to serve as Assistant Commissioner until October 20, 2003, when Governor of Oklahoma Brad Henry appointed him the Interim Commissioner of the Department of Public Safety following the resignation of Cabinet Secretary Ricks.

=== Promotions ===
Oklahoma Highway Patrol Promotions
Insignia	Rank	Date
	Commissioner	2004
	Assistant Commissioner	2000
	Captain	1998
	1st Lieutenant	1996
	2nd Lieutenant	1990
	Trooper	1985

== Secretary of Safety and Security ==
Following the resignation of Robert Ricks to become the Chief of Police of Edmond, Oklahoma, in 2004 Governor Brad Henry appointed Ward to serve concurrently as his second Secretary of Safety and Security. As Secretary, Ward is responsible for overseeing the Oklahoma Department of Public Safety, the Oklahoma Department of Emergency Management, the Oklahoma Department of Corrections, the Oklahoma State Bureau of Investigation, and the Oklahoma Office of Homeland Security. Governor Henry, at the same time he appointed him Safety and Security Secretary, appointed Ward as the Commissioner of Public Safety, giving Ward direct control over the Oklahoma Highway Patrol.

Ward served as Henry's Secretary of Safety and Security until the end of his term in 2011.

== Personal life ==
Ward resides in Yukon, Oklahoma, with his wife Renee and two sons Matthew and Mark.

== See also ==
- Oklahoma State Cabinet
- Oklahoma Department of Public Safety

Political offices
Preceded by Robert Ricks	Oklahoma Secretary of Safety and Security; Under Governor Brad Henry; 2004 - January 10, 2011	Succeeded by Michael C. Thompson
Preceded by Robert Ricks	Oklahoma Commissioner of Public Safety; Under Governor Brad Henry; 2004 - January 10, 2011	Succeeded by Michael C. Thompson
