= Bob Ricks =

American FBI agent (born 1944)

Chief of Police for Edmond, Oklahoma
- In office 2003–2017

Oklahoma Secretary of Safety and Security
- In office 1996–2003
- Governor: Frank Keating
- Succeeded by: Kevin L. Ward

Oklahoma Commissioner of Public Safety
- In office 1996–2003
- Governor: Frank Keating
- Succeeded by: Kevin L. Ward

Personal details
- Born: Robert A. Ricks; October 14, 1944 (age 82) Houston, Texas
- Education: Baylor University
- Occupation: FBI Agent

Robert A. Ricks (born October 14, 1944) — known as Bob Ricks and "Backdraft Bob" — is an American law enforcement agent and politician from Texas and Oklahoma. He has worked for the Federal Bureau of Investigation, the Governor of Oklahoma and in local law enforcement. He is best known as the FBI Assistant Special Agent in Charge during the 1993 Waco Siege or as FBI Special Agent in Charge during the 1995 Oklahoma City bombing investigation.

Following his retirement from federal service, Ricks served as the Oklahoma Secretary of Safety and Security under Governor of Oklahoma Frank Keating. He was Secretary during the Keating's entire term as governor, from 1995 to 2003. Concurrent with his service as Secretary, he was also appointed by Keating as Commissioner of the Oklahoma Department of Public Safety.

== Education ==
Ricks was born in Houston, Texas, and received his early education in Del Rio, Texas. He received his Bachelor of Business Administration from Baylor University in 1967 and his Juris Doctor degree from Baylor Law School in 1969, where he served as an Editor of the Baylor Law Review and was a member of Phi Delta Phi.

== Federal Bureau of Investigation ==
Ricks served 26 years in Federal law enforcement from 1969 to 1995, during which he rose from the position of Special Agent with the Federal Bureau of Investigation to Special Agent In Charge of the FBI in Oklahoma. He also served in various other positions of authority from Assistant Special Agent in Charge, Inspector, and Deputy Assistant Director.

=== Waco Siege ===
In 1993, Ricks was a Special Agent in Charge of the FBI's Oklahoma City field office. Following a raid on the Branch Davidian church by the Bureau of Alcohol, Tobacco and Firearms on February 28, 1993, the FBI assumed command of the Waco Siege. Ricks was named one of three Assistant Special Agents in Charge, under the direction of Jeff Jamar. The others were Richard Schwein and Richard Swensen.

Ricks served as FBI spokesman during the Waco siege, often speaking for the government at press conferences. On April 16, Ricks told the media:

We are going to get them. . .to bring them before the bar of justice for the murder of our agents. They're going to answer for their crimes. That's the bottom line to this whole thing, they're going to come out.

Ricks told the media that operations were costing $2 million a day. However, a later Senate Appropriations Committee hearing revealed actual costs as of April 22, 1993, were $6,792,000, an average of $130,000 a day.

At the direction of newly appointed United States Attorney General Janet Reno, FBI agents mounted a final assault on the Davidian church on April 19. By the end of the day, 76 Branch Davidians were dead, including women and children, and federal agents had seized control over the compound. Ricks' negligence in handling the Waco siege led to reforms in training procedures for FBI agents.

Six years after the Waco siege, Ricks was charged as a defendant in the 1999 civil suit Andrade et al. vs Chojnacki et al.

=== Oklahoma City bombing ===
Ricks was serving as the Special Agent in Charge for the FBI's Oklahoma City field office when, on April 19, 1995, Timothy McVeigh destroyed the Alfred P. Murrah Federal Building in downtown Oklahoma City, Oklahoma. It was the most significant act of terrorism on American soil until the September 11 attacks in 2001, claiming the lives of 168 victims and injuring more than 680. As the Special Agent in Charge, Ricks worked with Governor of Oklahoma Frank Keating and senior FBI and United States Department of Justice officials in the response to, and later investigation of, the attack.

=== Other federal service ===
Ricks served as chairman for the Oklahoma Federal Executive Board, which had oversight responsibilities for all Federal agencies in the State of Oklahoma. Ricks also served three years with the Drug Enforcement Administration where he was the Chief Counsel for DEA.

== Secretary of Safety and Security ==
After serving 26 years with the FBI, in 1995 Ricks retired from federal service as Special Agent in Charge of the Oklahoma City FBI Field Office. Following his retirement, Governor of Oklahoma Frank Keating appointed him as his Secretary of Safety and Security. As Secretary, Ricks oversaw the Oklahoma Department of Public Safety, the Oklahoma State Bureau of Investigation, the Oklahoma Bureau of Narcotics, the Oklahoma Department of Corrections and the Oklahoma Department of Emergency Management. Concurrently with his service as Secretary, Keating also appointed him Commissioner of Public Safety, giving Ricks direct control over the Oklahoma Highway Patrol.

In 2003 when Democrat Brad Henry was elected to succeed Keating, Ricks agreed to stay on as Secretary in the Henry Administration. He remained in that position until October 2003 when he resigned as Secretary to become the Chief of Police for Edmond, Oklahoma. Henry appointed Kevin Ward, the deputy secretary under Ricks, to succeed him as Secretary.

== Edmond Chief of Police ==
Ricks served as Chief of Police in Edmond, Oklahoma 2003–2017.

Political offices
Preceded by	Oklahoma Secretary of Safety and Security; Under Governor Frank Keating; 1995 - 2003	Succeeded by Kevin Ward
Preceded by	Oklahoma Commissioner of Public Safety; Under Governor Frank Keating; 1995 - 2003	Succeeded by Kevin Ward
Preceded by	Chief of Police for Edmond, Oklahoma; 2003 - present	Incumbent
