= Oklahoma Highway Safety Office =

Agency to promote highway safety in Oklahoma, US

Agency overview
- Formed: 1967
- Headquarters: 200 NE 21st Street; Oklahoma City, Oklahoma
- Employees: 26 (part of DPS)
- Annual budget: $10.9 million (part of DPS)
- Minister responsible: Tricia Everest, Secretary of Safety and Security
- Agency executive: Paul Harris, Director
- Parent agency: Oklahoma Department of Public Safety (DPS)
- Website: Oklahoma Highway Safety Office

The Oklahoma Highway Safety Office (OHSO) is an agency of the State of Oklahoma responsible for promoting highway safety. The OHSO is responsible for developing an annual statewide Highway Safety Plan to decrease fatalities and injuries on Oklahoma roadways. The OHSO is a division of the Oklahoma Department of Public Safety.

The OHSO is supervised by the Oklahoma Secretary of Safety and Security, who is the Governor's Representative for Highway Safety, and under the direct administrative control of the Director of Highway Safety, who is a career civil servant of the State government. The current Highway Safety Representative is Tim Tipton and the current Highway Safety Director is Paul Harris.

The Highway Safety Office was created in 1967 during the term of Governor Dewey F. Bartlett.

== Leadership ==
The Highway Safety Office located within the Oklahoma Department of Public Safety. As such, the Office is under the supervision of the Secretary of Safety and Security, and the Commissioner of Public Safety.

== Overview ==
The OHSO is funded through grants from the National Highway Traffic Safety Administration. Most programs and activities of the OHSO fall into the areas of traffic safety education, training, and enforcement enhancement.

== Divisions ==
- Governor's Representative for Highway Safety
  - Director of Highway Safety
    - Deputy Director
      - Program Management
      - Community Engagement
    - Chief of Plans
      - Data Analysis/FARS
    - Budget Analyst
      - Financial Management
      - Communications

== Behavioral Traffic Safety Program ==
A portion of the budget for the OHSO funds programs with the goal of reducing the number and severity of crashes on Oklahoma roadways. Protects include enforcement and public information and education campaigns. Focused campaigns include the ENDUI Oklahoma program, OkieMoto (motorcycle safety), as well as support for various National Highway Traffic Safety Administration campaigns including, Click It or Ticket, Drive Sober or Get Pulled Over, and other state/local initiatives.

== Local Outreach ==
The OHSO issues many grants each federal fiscal year to local and state-wide agencies and organizations in Oklahoma. A large part of the overall local outreach plan for the OHSO is a grant with the Oklahoma County Sheriff’s Office (OCSO). The OCSO has two full-time deputy sheriffs assigned to work at the OHSO. These two Sergeants are responsible for setting up and executing public awareness events across Oklahoma each year. Tools and equipment used by the OCSO Highway Safety deputies include a rollover simulator, impaired driving simulators, distracted driving simulators, and other tools.

The OCSO Sergeants also participate in safety events across Oklahoma, presenting safety information and operating their various simulators. Events include college football games, safety fairs, Cops N Kids events, and other events.

== Events ==
Each year, the OHSO plans and puts on several training events and conferences across the state. In 2019, the idea to combine all of these events into one large event was created. In February 2020, the OHSO hosted the first Oklahoma Traffic Safety Summit (Summit). The Summit combined the annual Oklahoma Drug Recognition Expert Conference, the Fatality Crash Reporting Conference, the annual Stakeholders Meeting, the Traffic Safety Forum, and other events.

== See also ==
- National Highway Traffic Safety Administration
