= 2026 Oklahoma gubernatorial election =

- November 3, 2026
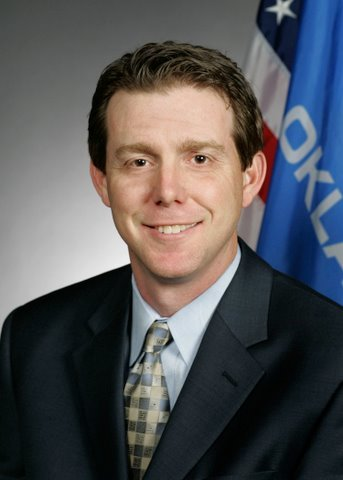

Nominee	Mike Mazzei	Cyndi Munson
Party	Republican	Democratic
Popular vote	582,039	514,776
Percentage	51.92%	45.92%
- Mazzei: 40–50% 50–60% 60–70% 70–80% 80–90% >90% Munson: 40–50% 50–60% 60–70% 70–80% 80–90% >90% Tie: 40–50% 50% No votes
Governor before election
Kevin Stitt
Republican
Elected Governor
Mike Mazzei
Republican

The 2026 Oklahoma gubernatorial election took place on November 3, 2026, to elect the next governor of Oklahoma. Republican former state senator Mike Mazzei and Democratic state representative Cyndi Munson were the nominees for their respective parties. Republican incumbent Kevin Stitt was term-limited and ineligible to seek a third term.

Primary elections were held on June 16, 2026, and in races where no candidate receives over 50% of the vote, runoff elections took place on August 25, 2026. Mike Mazzei won the general election by about 6%. This was the best performance for a Democrat in a gubernatorial election in Oklahoma since 2006, which was the last time a Democrat won, and the closest election since 2002.

== Republican primary ==
=== Campaign ===
In August 2023, KOSU noted that Attorney General Gentner Drummond had raised significantly more than other statewide elected officials in 2023, fueling rumors of a gubernatorial run. The same month, The Black Wall Street Times reported State Superintendent of Public Instruction Ryan Walters was preparing for a 2026 gubernatorial campaign. U.S. Representative Kevin Hern was the first major contender to public acknowledge he was considering a campaign in August 2024, but ruled out a run that December after House Republicans won a narrow majority in the 2024 elections. In early January 2025, former state senator Mike Mazzei posted a gubernatorial campaign logo to Facebook.

On January 13, 2025, Drummond announced his campaign for governor. He was the first major candidate to enter the race and the second overall after Leisa Mitchell Haynes. On February 18, former Oklahoma House Speaker Charles McCall officially announced his campaign. Mazzei officially launched his campaign on April 3. In May, former state senator Jake Merrick entered the race followed by businessman Kenneth Sturgell. On October 1, former Governor Frank Keating's son, Chip Keating, entered the race.

=== Candidates ===
==== Nominee ====
- Mike Mazzei, former Oklahoma secretary of budget (2019–2020) and former state senator from the 25th district (2004–2016)

==== Eliminated in runoff ====
- Gentner Drummond, attorney general of Oklahoma (2023–present)

==== Eliminated in primary ====
- Jennifer Domenico, small business owner
- Leisa Mitchell Haynes, former Mangum city manager
- Chip Keating, former Oklahoma secretary of public safety (2019–2020)
- Charles McCall, former speaker of the Oklahoma House of Representatives (2017–2025) from the 22nd district (2013–2024)
- Jake Merrick, former state senator from the 22nd district (2021–2022)
- Kenneth Sturgell, HVAC business owner
- Calup Anthony Taylor

==== Declined ====
- G. T. Bynum, former mayor of Tulsa (2016–2024)
- Kevin Hern, U.S. representative from Oklahoma's 1st congressional district (2018–present) (running for U.S. Senate)
- James Lankford, U.S. senator (2015–present)
- Matt Pinnell, lieutenant governor of Oklahoma (2019–present)

=== First round ===
==== Endorsements ====
Gentner Drummond

Labor unions

- Oklahoma City Firefighters Association
- Oklahoma Fraternal Order of Police

Organizations

- ~~Oklahoma Cattlemen's Association~~ (endorsement rescinded)
Chip Keating

Statewide officials

- Kevin Stitt, governor of Oklahoma (2019–present)

Individuals

- Mike Gundy, former Oklahoma State Cowboys football coach (2005–2025)
- Harold Hamm, oilman
- Barry Switzer, former football coach
- Bob Stoops, former football coach

Organizations

- Oil & Gas Workers Association
Mike Mazzei

Executive branch officials

- Donald Trump, 45th and 47th President of the United States (2017–2021, 2025–present)

U.S. representatives

- Josh Brecheen, OK-02 (2023–present)
- David McIntosh, former IN-2 (1995–2001)

Statewide officials

- Sean Kouplen, former secretary of commerce of Oklahoma (2019–2021)
- John O'Connor, former attorney general of Oklahoma (2021–2023)

State legislators

- Gary Stanislawski, former state senator from the 35th district (2008–2021)

Individuals

- Roger Stone

Organizations

- Club for Growth PAC
Jake Merrick

State legislators

- Shane Jett, state senator from the 17th district (2021–present)
- Jim Shaw, state representative from the 32nd district (2024–present)
Declined to endorse

U.S. representatives

- Tom Cole, OK-04 (2003–present)
- Kevin Hern, OK-01 (2018–present)
- Frank Lucas, OK-03 (2003–present)

Statewide officials

- ~~Kevin Stitt, governor of Oklahoma (2019–present)~~

==== Polling ====
Poll source	Date(s) administered	Sample size (Note: Key: A – all adults RV – registered voters LV – likely voters V – unclear)	Margin of error	Gentner Drummond	Chip Keating	Mike Mazzei	Jake Merrick	Charles McCall	Other	Undecided
JMC Analytics (R)	June 2–3, 2026	550 (LV)	± 4.2%	21%	12%	26%	12%	8%	4% (Note: Jennifer Domenico with 2%; Leisa Haynes and Kenneth Sturgell with 1%; Calup Taylor with 0%)	17%
	May 29, 2026	Trump endorses Mazzei								
Pulse Decision Science (R) (Note: Poll sponsored by Club for Growth, which opposes Drummond)	May 26–28, 2026	608 (LV)	± 4.0%	24%	17%	22%	–	12%	12% (Note: "5 others combined" with 12%)	13%
NonDoc Media	May 21–25, 2026	457 (RV)	–	22%	21%	22%	7%	18%	10% (Note: Kenneth Sturgell with 3%; Jennifer Domenico with 3%; Leisa Haynes with 2%; Calup Taylor with 1%)	–
Pulse Decision Science (R)	April 7–9, 2026	– (LV)	–	33%	21%	15%	–	12%	8% (Note: "5 others combined" with 8%)	11%
Cole Hargrave Snodgrass & Associates (R)	January 26–30, 2026	600 (LV)	± 4.3%	36%	13%	13%	5%	14%	–	19%
yes. every kid.	October 29–31, 2025	513 (LV)	± 4.3%	22%	7%	2%	2%	22%	1% (Note: "Someone else" with 1%)	44%
co/efficient (R)	October 25–27, 2025	855 (LV)	± 3.2%	20%	5%	1%	3%	31%	3% (Note: "Someone else" with 3%)	38%
Stratus Intelligence (R) (Note: Poll sponsored by McCall's campaign)	October 15–17, 2025	806 (LV)	± 3.5%	30%	7%	1%	4%	32%	–	19%
Stratus Intelligence (R)	September 23–25, 2025	–	± 3.5%	35%	–	–	–	33%	–	32%
Cole Hargrave Snodgrass & Associates (R)	August 4–10, 2025	400 (LV)	± 4.3%	48%	4%	2%	4%	10%	–	33%
Victory Insights (R) (Note: Poll sponsored by the Calvin Coolidge Project)	February 23–25, 2025	506 (LV)	–	37%	3%	1%	–	6%	–	52%
Cole Hargrave Snodgrass & Associates (R)	February 10–15, 2025	500 (RV)	± 4.3%	50%	7%	–	–	7%	–	37%

Hypothetical polling

with Ryan Walters

Poll source	Date(s) administered	Sample size	Margin of error	Gentner Drummond	Chip Keating	Mike Mazzei	Jake Merrick	Charles McCall	Matt Pinnell	Ryan Walters	Undecided
Cole Hargrave Snodgrass & Associates (R)	August 4–10, 2025	500 (RV)	± 4.3%	43%	4%	2%	3%	8%	–	8%	33%
Cole Hargrave Snodgrass & Associates (R)	May 5–9, 2025	500 (RV)	± 4.3%	39%	3%	1%	1%	5%	10%	12%	31%
Cole Hargrave Snodgrass & Associates (R)	February 10–15, 2025	500 (RV)	± 4.3%	44%	6%	–	–	5%	–	14%	32%

==== Debate and forum ====
2026 Oklahoma gubernatorial election Republican primary debate and candidate forum
No.	Date	Host	Moderator	Link	Republican	Republican	Republican	Republican
Key: P Participant A Absent N Not invited I Invited W Withdrawn								
Key: P Participant A Absent N Not invited I Invited W Withdrawn					Gentner Drummond	Chip Keating	Mike Mazzei	Charles McCall
1	Apr. 6, 2026	Oklahoma's Own Politics; Oklahoma Hospital Association	Jonathan Cooper; Haley Hetrick	YouTube	P	P	P	P
2	May 28, 2026	KSWO-TV; NonDoc	Jennah James; Tres Savage	YouTube	P	P	P	P

==== Results ====
Primary results by county: Drummond: 20–30%; 30–40%; Mazzei: 20–30%; 30–40%; Keating: 20–30%; 30–40%; Merrick: 20–30%; 30–40%; 40–50%; McCall: 20–30%; 30–40%; 40–50%; 60–70%

Republican primary results
Party	Candidate	Votes	%
Republican	Gentner Drummond	105,832	26.3
Republican	Mike Mazzei	104,691	26.0
Republican	Chip Keating	74,379	18.5
Republican	Jake A. Merrick	58,341	14.5
Republican	Charles McCall	47,519	11.8
Republican	Leisa Mitchell Haynes	4,121	1.0
Republican	Jennifer Domenico	3,796	0.9
Republican	Kenneth Sturgell	2,935	0.7
Republican	Calup Anthony Taylor	1,485	0.4
Total votes		403,099	100.0

=== Runoff ===
==== Endorsements ====
Gentner Drummond

State legislators

- Trey Caldwell, state representative
- Mike Kelley, state representative
- Spencer Kern, state senator
- Mark Lawson, House Majority Leader
- Dick Lowe, state representative
- Anthony Moore, speaker pro-tempore
- Daniel Pae, state representative
- Paul Rosino, state senator
- Brenda Stanley, state senator

County officials

- Terry Park, Choctaw County sheriff
Mike Mazzei

Federal executive officials

- Markwayne Mullin, Secretary of Homeland Security and former U.S. senator from Oklahoma

Statewide elected officials

- John M. O'Connor, former attorney general of Oklahoma
- Sarah Huckabee Sanders, governor of Arkansas
- Kevin Stitt, governor of Oklahoma (2019–present)

State legislators

- David Bullard, state senator
- George Burns, state senator
- Chad Caldwell, state representative
- Mark Chapman, state representative
- Randy Grellner, state senator
- Brian Guthrie, state senator
- David Hardin, state representative
- Molly Jenkins, state senator
- Shane Jett, state senator
- Mark Lepak, state representative
- Jake A. Merrick, former state senator and 2026 candidate for governor
- Dan Newberry, state senator
- Kendal Sacchieri, state senator
- Danny Williams, state representative

County officials

- Steve Kunzweiler, Tulsa County district attorney
- Allan Star, Adair County commissioner
- Larry Wood, Adair County commissioner

Organizations

- Oklahoma Republican Party State Committee

==== Polling ====
Poll source	Date(s) administered	Sample size	Margin of error	Gentner Drummond	Mike Mazzei	Undecided
CHS & Associates (R)	August 2–4, 2026	600 (LV)	± 4.0%	44%	44%	12%
Pulse Decision Science (R)	August 2–4, 2026	600 (LV)	± 4.0%	38%	44%	18%
Pulse Decision Science (R)	June 21–23, 2026	606 (LV)	± 4.0%	38%	44%	18%
Cygnal (R)	June 18–19, 2026	600 (LV)	± 4.0%	44%	42%	14%

==== Results ====
Republican primary runoff results
Party	Candidate	Votes	%
Republican	Mike Mazzei	186,734	50.3
Republican	Gentner Drummond	184,681	49.7
Total votes		371,415	100.0

== Democratic primary ==
=== Candidates ===
==== Nominee ====
- Cyndi Munson, minority leader of the Oklahoma House of Representatives (2022–present) from the 85th district (2015–present)

==== Eliminated in primary ====
- Arya Azma, securities trader and candidate for U.S. Senate in 2022
- Connie Johnson, former state senator from the 48th district (2005–2014), nominee for U.S. Senate in 2014, and candidate for governor in 2018 and 2022

=== Results ===
Primary results by county: Munson: 50–60%; 60–70%; 70–80%; 80–90%

Democratic primary results
Party	Candidate	Votes	%
Democratic	Cyndi Munson	129,225	74.9
Democratic	Constance Johnson	38,414	22.3
Democratic	Arya Azma	4,824	2.8
Total votes		172,463	100.0

== Independents ==
=== Candidates ===
==== Declared ====
- Robert Brooks Sr., farmer
- Orlando Lynn Bush
- Jerry Griffin, former Tulsa school board member

== General election ==
=== Predictions ===
Source	Ranking	As of
The Cook Political Report	Likely R	October 29, 2026
Decision Desk HQ	Safe R	November 3, 2026
Fox News	Solid R	November 1, 2026
Inside Elections	Likely R	October 29, 2026
NBC News	Likely R	November 3, 2026
RealClearPolitics	Solid R	November 1, 2026
Sabato's Crystal Ball	Likely R	November 2, 2026
Silver Bulletin	Likely R	November 3, 2026

=== Post-primary endorsements ===
Mike Mazzei (R)

Organizations

- Oklahoma Farm Bureau
Cyndi Munson (D)

Organizations

- EMILYs List
- Everytown for Gun Safety
- National Women's Political Caucus

=== Polling ===
Poll source	Date(s) administered	Sample size	Margin of error	Mike Mazzei (R)	Cyndi Munson (D)	Other	Undecided
Workbench Strategy (D) (Note: Poll sponsored by Munson's campaign)	October 8–13, 2026	600 (LV)	± 4.0%	49%	45%	6%	
Cross Timbers Poll	October 7–12, 2026	91 (LV)	± 15.0%	39%	36%	8% (Note: Jerry Griffin with 7%; Robert Brooks Sr. with 1%; Orlando Lynn Bush with <1%)	17%
Cross Timbers Poll	October 7–12, 2026	128 (RV)	± 12.0%	33%	30%	5% (Note: Jerry Griffin with 4%; Robert Brooks Sr. with 1%; Orlando Lynn Bush with <1%)	32%
Cross Timbers Poll	September 27–30, 2026	86 (LV)	± 12.0%	46%	36%	<1% (Note: Robert Brooks Sr. with <1%)	18%
Cross Timbers Poll	September 27–30, 2026	118 (RV)	± 11.0%	38%	34%	1% (Note: Jerry Griffin with 1%; Robert Brooks Sr. with <1%)	27%

=== Results ===
2026 Oklahoma gubernatorial election
Party	Candidate	Votes	%	±%
Republican	Mike Mazzei	582,039	51.92	−3.53
Democratic	Cyndi Munson	514,776	45.92	+4.13
Independent	Robert E. Brooks Sr.	11,660	1.04	N/A
Independent	Jerry Griffin	7,441	0.66	N/A
Independent	Orlando Lynn Bush	5,014	0.45	N/A
Total votes		1,120,930		
Republican hold				

==== By congressional district ====
Mazzei won three congressional districts, while Munson won two congressional districts, both of which elected Republicans.

District	Mazzei	Munson	Representative elected
1st	46.84%	51.06%	Mark Tedford
2nd	63.69%	33.47%	Josh Brecheen
3rd	55.22%	42.54%	Frank Lucas
4th	51.76%	46.30%	Tom Cole
5th	44.67%	53.59%	Stephanie Bice

== See also ==
- 2026 United States elections
- 2026 Oklahoma elections

== Notes ==
Partisan clients
