= James Crabtree (disambiguation) =

James, Jim or Jimmy Crabtree may refer to:

- Jimmy Crabtree, (1871–1908) English footballer
- Jimmy Crabtree (footballer, born 1895) (1895–1965) English footballer
- James Crabtree, British author and geopolitical analyst
- Jim Crabtree, American artist

== See also ==
- James Crabtree Correctional Center
