= Camino nuevo =

Camino nuevo is a Spanish phrase meaning "New highway." The term is used in shorthand for several facilities:

- Camino Nuevo Charter Academy
- Camino Nuevo Correctional Center, Albuquerque NM

== Other ==
- Camino Nuevo, a barrio in Yabucoa, Puerto Rico
