= Oklahoma Sentencing Commission =

Agency overview
- Formed: 1997
- Preceding agencies: Sentencing and Release Policy Committee; Truth in Sentencing Policy Advisory Commission
- Dissolved: August 26, 2009
- Superseding agency: Oklahoma State Bureau of Investigation
- Website: www.ocjrc.net

The Oklahoma Sentencing Commission was an independent agency of the government of Oklahoma. Now defunct, the Commission was established to maintain an effective, fair, and efficient sentencing system for the state of Oklahoma. The 17-member commission was also charged with enhancing public safety, providing truth-in-sentencing and unwarranted disparity in the sentencing of individuals convicted in the state's criminal justice system.

The Commission was provided staff support by the Oklahoma Criminal Justice Resource Center. The Commission appoints the Director of the OCJRC.

On August 26, 2009, the Commission was dissolved following the transfer of the duties of the Center to the Oklahoma State Bureau of Investigation.

== History ==
Sentencing reform was initially begun in 1989 when the Oklahoma Legislature created the Sentencing and Release Policy Committee. The work of the committee evolved into the creation of the Truth in Sentencing Policy Advisory Commission in 1994, followed by the creation of the Oklahoma Sentencing Commission in 1997. In 2009, the Commission was dissolved following the termination and transfer of function of the Oklahoma Criminal Justice Resource Center to the Oklahoma State Bureau of Investigation.

== Membership ==
The membership of the Commission was composed of the following, all serving five year terms:

- A Justice of the Oklahoma Supreme Court, appointed by the Chief Justice
- An indigent defender, appointed by the Director of the Administrative Office of the Courts
- One member, appointed by the Governor of Oklahoma, to represent the general public
- Two members of the Oklahoma House of Representatives, one of whom shall be a Republican and one of whom shall be a Democrat, to be appointed by the Speaker of the Oklahoma House of Representatives
- Two members of the Oklahoma Senate, one of whom shall be a Republican and one of whom shall be a Democrat, to be appointed by the President pro tempore of the Oklahoma Senate
- A sitting district attorney appointed by the Oklahoma District Attorneys Council
- The Attorney General of Oklahoma or his chief deputy
- The Director of State Finance or his designee
- A defense attorney appointed by the Oklahoma Bar Association
- A sitting judge of any district court in the state appointed by the assembly of presiding judges
- The Director of the Oklahoma Indigent Defense System or his chief deputy
- The Director of the Oklahoma State Bureau of Investigation or a designee
- The Director of the Oklahoma Department of Corrections or his chief deputy
- One member, to be appointed by the Governor of Oklahoma, to represent a faith-based organization that specializes in providing prison reintegration services for inmates
- A crime victim or representative of crime victims appointed by the other fourteen members of the Commission from a list of five persons submitted to the Commission by the Victim’s Compensation Board
