= Oklahoma Criminal Justice Resource Center =

Agency overview
- Formed: August 1, 1989
- Preceding agency: Statistical Analysis Center
- Dissolved: July 1, 2009
- Superseding agency: Oklahoma State Bureau of Investigation

The Oklahoma Criminal Justice Resource Center (OCJRC) was an agency of the State of Oklahoma. Dissolved on July 1, 2009, the Center was a division of the Oklahoma Legislative Service Bureau with its director appointed by the Oklahoma Sentencing Commission (OSC). As its primary responsibilities, the OCJRC provides research and analysis relating to the state's criminal justice system and integrated, customizable records management software for law enforcement in the form of the Offender Data Information System (ODIS). OCJRC serves as the state's Statistical Analysis Center (SAC), the official point of contact with the federal Bureau of Justice Statistics. As the state's SAC, OCJRC is a member of the Justice Research and Statistics Association.

Upon its dissolution, the Center's duties related to research were transferred to the newly created Office of Criminal Justice Statistics of the Oklahoma State Bureau of Investigation and the Domestic Violence Fatality Review Board was transferred to the Office of the Oklahoma Attorney General.
