= Odilia Dank =

American politician (1938–2013)

Odilia Mary Russo Dank
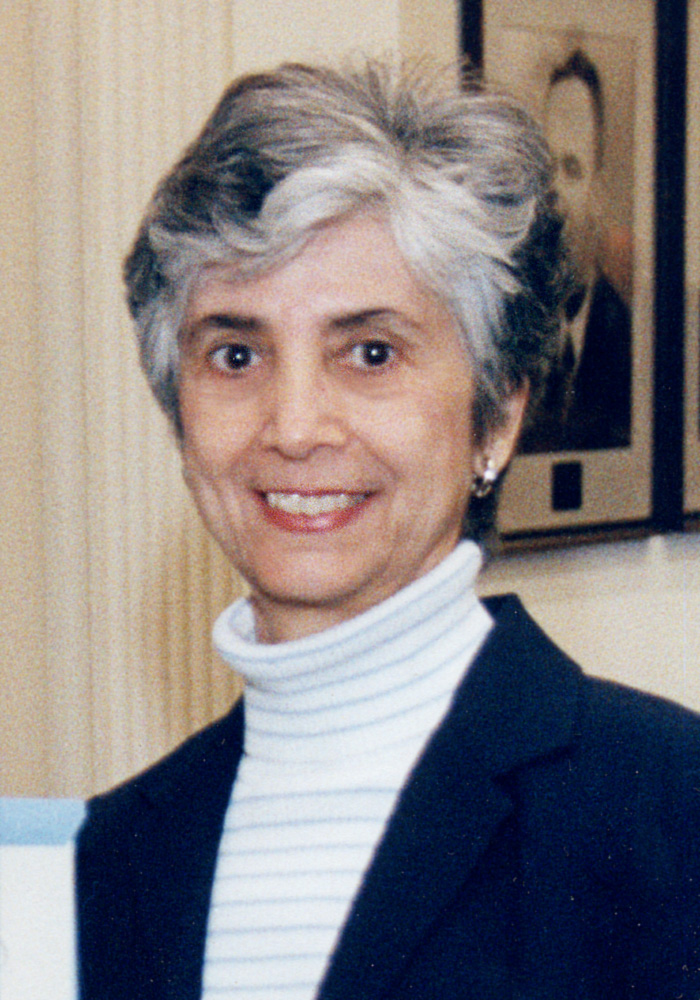

Member of the Oklahoma House of Representatives from the 85th district
- In office 1994–2006
- Preceded by: Mary Fallin
- Succeeded by: David Dank

Personal details
- Born: Odilia Mary Russo; September 3, 1938 Cleveland, Ohio, U.S.
- Died: August 17, 2013 (aged 74) Oklahoma City, Oklahoma, U.S.
- Party: Republican
- Spouse: David Dank
- Children: 1
- Education: Randolph-Macon Women's College; University of Oklahoma
- Occupation: Politician educator

Odilia Mary Russo Dank (September 3, 1938 – August 17, 2013) was an American educator and politician from Oklahoma City who served as a Republican member of the Oklahoma House of Representatives, from District 85. Dank was elected in 1994 and served until she was term limited in 2006.

== Early life ==
Odilia Mary Russo Dank was born in Cleveland, Ohio, to parents Dr. Peter and Dr. Magdalene Russo. The family moved to Oklahoma when she was two years old. Dank and her family lived at Lake Aluma Chulosa, a small township on the northeast side of Oklahoma City. Her father worked as a radiologist and her mother worked as a dentist prior to marriage. Dank graduated from Casady High School in Oklahoma City.

=== Education and career ===
Thereafter, Dank earned a bachelor's degree in 1960 from Randolph-Macon Woman's College in Lynchburg, Virginia. In 1974, she received a Master of Education degree from the University of Oklahoma at Norman.

Dank worked in the Oklahoma City public school system for 20 years as an educator and counselor; for 12 years, she was a counselor at Del City High School. Her first teaching job in southwest Oklahoma City was teaching government and Oklahoma history. On the weekends, Dank and a fellow teacher would travel around the state which in turn resulted in her interest in politics.

== Oklahoma House of Representatives (1994–2006) ==
Mary Fallin vacated her House seat in order to run for lieutenant governor and Dank decided to campaign for the vacancy. Dank was elected to represent District 85 in the Oklahoma House of Representatives in 1994 and served until 2006 when her husband, David Dank, ran and succeeded her. During her time in office she was appointed chairman of the Education Committee, the first woman in that position. She also served two terms as vice chairman of the Oklahoma Republican Party.

=== Committees ===
- Chair of the Common Education Committee
- House Appropriation sub-committee on Education
- Rules, and Revenue and Taxation committee
- Children and Family committee

=== Awards and achievements ===
Dank received several awards and recognition for her work in the legislature, including:

- Pioneering Spirit Award by the Oklahoma Charter Association
- REID's legislative excellence award (2004)
- Casady Alumni Achievement Award (2001)
- Oklahoma State Chamber's Outstanding Legislator Award (1999)
- Distinguished Service Award from the Mid-Del City schools for outstanding performance and dedicated service (1989)

== Death ==
Dank died of cancer on August 17, 2013, in Oklahoma City.

Governor Mary Fallin, Dank's predecessor in the state House, issued an executive order on August 19 directing that all flags on state property be flown at half-staff in Dank's honor from August 23–26.
