= Mike Mazzei =

Governor-elect of Oklahoma (born 1965)

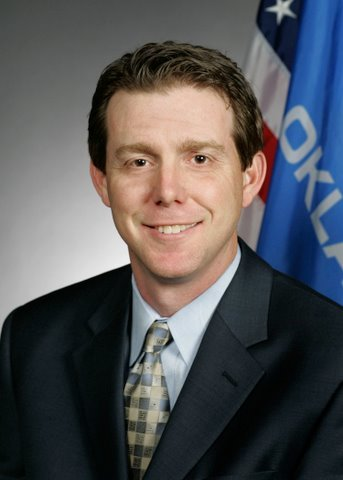
- Official portrait, 2011

Governor-elect of Oklahoma
- Assuming office January 14, 2027
- Lieutenant: T. W. Shannon (elect)
- Succeeding: Kevin Stitt

Budget Secretary of Oklahoma
- In office January 14, 2019 – October 12, 2020
- Governor: Kevin Stitt
- Preceded by: Position established
- Succeeded by: John Laws

Member of the Oklahoma Senate from the 25th district
- In office November 17, 2004 – November 22, 2016
- Preceded by: Charles Ford
- Succeeded by: Joe Newhouse

Personal details
- Born: Michael Paul Mazzei; May 30, 1965 (age 61)
- Party: Republican
- Spouse: Noel
- Education: George Mason University (BA); College for Financial Planning (MS)
- Website: Campaign website

Michael Paul Mazzei (born May 30, 1965) is an American politician who is the governor-elect of Oklahoma. A member of the Republican Party, he served in the Oklahoma Senate from 2004 to 2016 and as the Oklahoma secretary of budget from 2019 to 2020.

In the 2026 Oklahoma gubernatorial election, he defeated Cyndi Munson and became the governor-elect of Oklahoma.

== Early life, family, and education ==
Mazzei was born on May 30, 1965. He earned a Bachelor of Arts from George Mason University and a Master of Science from the College for Financial Planning. He founded The Financial Coach Inc. He is the chairman and CEO of Trinity Strategic Wealth, a wealth and investment management firm based in Tulsa, Oklahoma.

He and his wife reside in Tulsa, and have five adult children. He is a member of Asbury Church.

== Oklahoma Senate ==
Mazzei was elected to the Oklahoma Senate by a majority in a five-person Republican primary in 2004. The Democratic Party did not field a candidate and no independent or third-party candidate filed for the general election. In 2007, he was appointed the assistant floor leader of the senate.

Mazzei faced no opposition in his 2008 election bid. In 2012, he faced a challenge in the Republican Primary election. He defeated Ronda Vuillemont-Smith to secure re-election. He was term limited in 2016 and was succeeded in office by Joe Newhouse.

== Stitt administration and later career ==
In 2019 and 2020, Mazzei served as Oklahoma Secretary of Budget, under Governor Kevin Stitt. In August 2021, Mazzei announced a campaign for Oklahoma State Treasurer, but dropped out of the race the following month.

In March 2025, Mazzei announced his candidacy for governor of Oklahoma in 2026. Mazzei narrowly defeated incumbent Oklahoma Attorney General Gentner Drummond in the runoff in the Republican primary in August 2026, and went on to become governor-elect of Oklahoma after defeating Democratic state representative Cyndi Munson in the November general election.

== Electoral history ==
July 27, 2004, Primary Election results for Oklahoma State Senator for District 25
Candidates	Party	Votes	%
Mike Mazzei	Republican Party	6,374	61.61%
Joan King Hastings	Republican Party	1,611	15.57%
Doug Gorman	Republican Party	1,433	13.85%
Dennis Loudermilk	Republican Party	788	7.62%
Fran Moghaddam	Republican Party	139	1.34%

June 26, 2012, Primary Election results for Oklahoma State Senator for District 25
Candidates	Party	Votes	%
Mike Mazzei	Republican Party	5,492	73.53%
Ronda Vuillemont-Smith	Republican Party	1,977	26.47%

Party political offices
Preceded by Kevin Stitt	Republican nominee for Governor of Oklahoma; 2026	Most recent
Political offices
Preceded by Kevin Stitt	Governor of Oklahoma; Taking office 2027	Elect
