= John Laws (Oklahoma cabinet secretary) =

Oklahoma Secretary of Budget
- In office October 13, 2022 – December 2024
- Governor: Kevin Stitt
- Preceded by: Mike Mazzei
- Succeeded by: Vacant

Personal details
- Education: University of Oklahoma; University of Texas

John Laws is an American businessman who served as the Oklahoma Secretary of Budget under Governor Kevin Stitt from 2022 to 2024.

== Education and career ==
John Laws graduated from the University of Oklahoma in 1998 and the University of Texas. He worked in management positions for various energy corporations for 20 years including Enable Midstream and OGE Energy Company.

== Oklahoma Secretary of Budget ==
Laws was appointed Oklahoma Secretary of Budget by Governor Kevin Stitt on October 13, 2022. He replaced Mike Mazzei who resigned in 2020. He maintained a financial interest in Enable Midstream while secretary. In September 2023, he drew media attention for sending emails to directors of state agencies reminding them Stitt encouraged to agencies to not file incremental budget requests in 2025. After Oklahoma Attorney General Gentner Drummond released an AG opinion on dual office holding that caused Tim Gatz resignation, Laws maintained his positions as both Oklahoma's Chief Financial Officer and the Secretary of Budget. He left office in December 2024.
