= Emily Virgin =

American politician (born 1986)

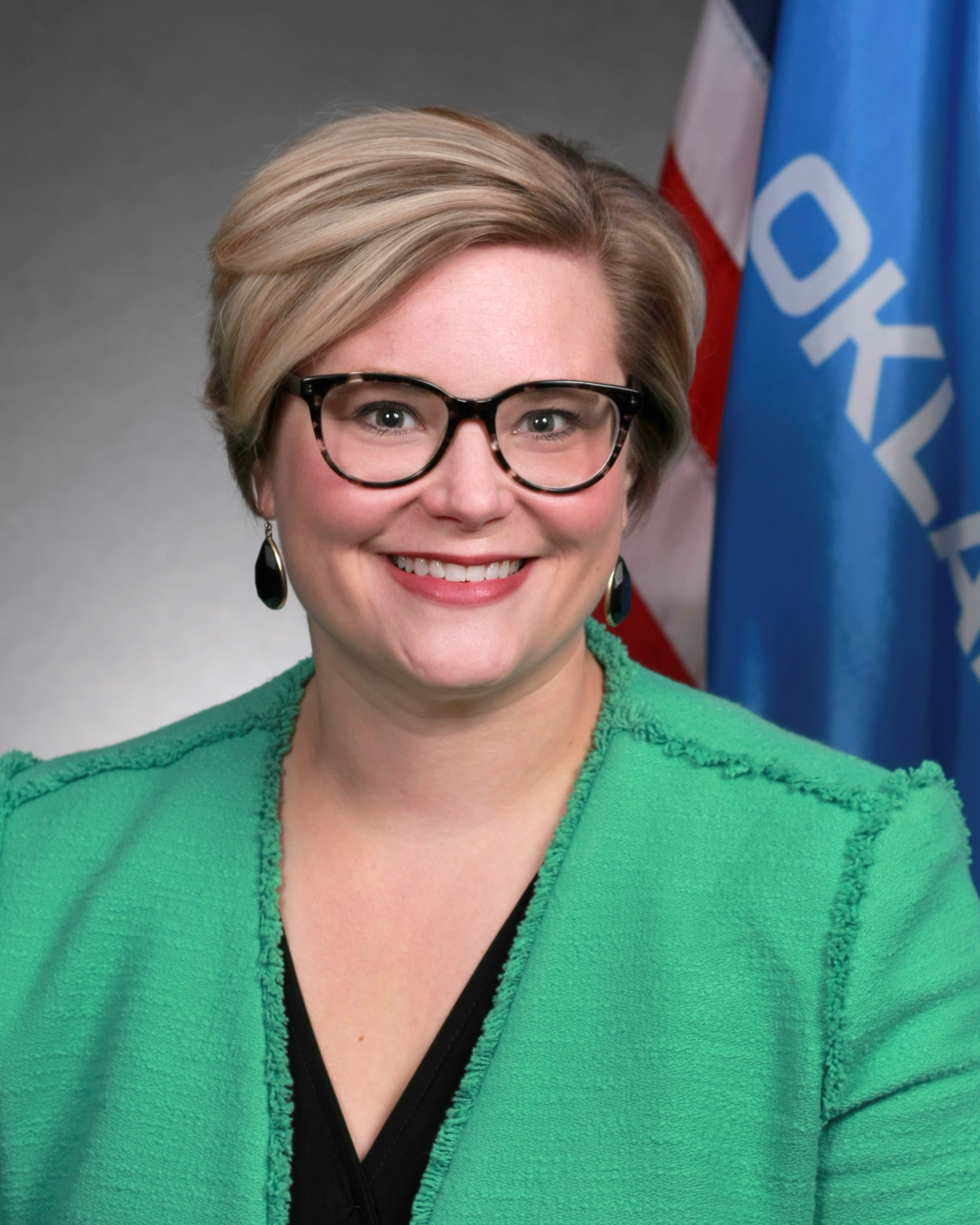

Minority Leader of the Oklahoma House of Representatives
- In office November 15, 2018 – November 16, 2022
- Preceded by: Steve Kouplen
- Succeeded by: Cyndi Munson

Member of the Oklahoma House of Representatives from the 44th district
- In office November 17, 2010 – November 16, 2022
- Preceded by: Bill Nations
- Succeeded by: Jared Deck

Personal details
- Born: October 1, 1986 (age 40) Norman, Oklahoma, U.S.
- Party: Democratic
- Education: University of Oklahoma (BA, JD)

Emily Virgin (born October 1, 1986) is an American politician who was the Minority Leader of the Oklahoma House of Representatives from 2018 to 2022. She previously served as House Democratic Caucus Chair. She was first elected in 2010 at the age of 24 and represents the 44th district, which includes Norman, Oklahoma. Virgin retired from the Oklahoma House at the end of 2022 due to term limits.

== Education ==
Virgin completed an undergraduate degree in criminology and political science at the University of Oklahoma in 2009. Virgin was elected to the House while attending law school at the University of Oklahoma, from which she earned her J.D. in 2013.

== Political career ==
In 2010, she won election to the House against Kent Hunt, a self-employed lawn care professional. At the time she was the youngest representative in the Democratic caucus, at 24 years old, although two younger Republicans were elected that same year. She campaigned on improving education in Oklahoma and fighting education cuts.

In 2015, the Oklahoma Legislature considered a religious freedom bill that would allow businesses to refuse services to individuals based on the business owner's religious beliefs, mainly in reference to bakers and photographers opposed to same-sex marriage. Virgin gained notice for proposing an amendment that would require the businesses to publicly post a notice specifying what classes of patrons they would refuse services to, in an attempt to derail the bill. The bill stalled the following week.

In May 2017, Virgin was elected House Democratic Caucus Chair; her term was to start the following year. As of 2017, Virgin is on the Appropriations and Budget Committee, Higher Education and Career Tech Committee, Judiciary – Civil and Environmental Committee, and Public Safety Committee.

On November 15, 2018, Virgin was named the Minority Leader for the Oklahoma House of Representatives, succeeding Steve Kouplen.

Oklahoma House of Representatives
Preceded by Steve Kouplen	Minority Leader of the Oklahoma House of Representatives; 2018–2022	Succeeded by Cyndi Munson
