= Chip Keating =

American businessman and former Oklahoma Secretary of Public Safety

Oklahoma Secretary of Public Safety
- In office February 21, 2019 – December 31, 2020
- Governor: Kevin Stitt
- Preceded by: Rusty Rhoades
- Succeeded by: Tricia Everest

Personal details
- Born: Francis Anthony Keating III; December 2, 1979 (age 46)
- Party: Republican
- Relatives: Frank Keating (father); Catherine Heller Keating (mother)
- Education: Southern Methodist University (BBA)

Francis Anthony "Chip" Keating III is an American businessman who served as the Oklahoma Secretary of Public Safety between 2019 and 2020.

Keating was a candidate for the Republican nomination for Governor of Oklahoma in the 2026 election.

== Early life, education, and family ==
Francis Anthony Keating III was born to Francis Anthony Keating II (who was later elected Governor of Oklahoma) and Catherine Heller Keating. He and his siblings were raised Catholic. He worked for the Oklahoma Highway Patrol between 2001 and 2004. Between August 2004 and March 2007 he worked as a commercial real estate broker for Trammell Crow Company. He graduated from Bishop McGuiness Catholic High School and Southern Methodist University before marrying Brittney Ann O’Kelley in October 2005. The same year unsuccessfully ran for the Oklahoma House of Representatives. Between March 2007 and March 2010 he worked for Chesapeake Energy as the Real Estate Development Manager. He has owned Keating Investments since March 2010.

== Oklahoma Secretary of Public Safety ==
Despite supporting Todd Lamb during the 2018 Oklahoma gubernatorial election, Keating was appointed Oklahoma Secretary of Public Safety on February 21, 2019, by Governor Kevin Stitt. He resigned December 31, 2020.

== Later political activities ==
Chip Keating, along with Michael Mallick, raised $100,000 for the Advance Right political action committee in 2024. The PAC paid for anti-Greg McCortney mailers, and he lost his reelection campaign.

Keating filed to run in the 2026 Oklahoma gubernatorial election in the Republican Party primary.
