= Bill Nations =

American politician (1942–2025)

Member of the Oklahoma House of Representatives from the 44th district
- In office 1998–2010
- Preceded by: Laura Boyd
- Succeeded by: Emily Virgin

Mayor of Norman, Oklahoma
- In office 1992–1998

City Councilor of Norman, Oklahoma
- In office 1986–1992

Personal details
- Born: June 28, 1942 Greenville, Texas, U.S.
- Died: February 4, 2025 (aged 82)
- Party: Democratic
- Education: B.A. History dentistry
- Alma mater: University of Oklahoma; Baylor University

William Glenn Nations (June 28, 1942 – February 4, 2025) was an American dentist and politician from the state of Oklahoma.

== Life and career ==
Nations was born in Greenville, Texas on June 28, 1942. He graduated from Noble High School in Noble, Oklahoma in 1960. He earned a bachelor's degree in history from the University of Oklahoma and obtained a degree in dentistry from Baylor University in 1968. Nations began working as a dentist in 1970. He was a member of the Norman City Council between 1986 and 1992, when he was elected mayor. Nations remained mayor until 1998, when he won his first Oklahoma House of Representatives election. He represented district 44 until 2010. Nations was term-limited, and succeeded in office by Emily Virgin.

Nations' wife, Teena, died in August 2012, at the age of 69. He died on February 4, 2025, at the age of 82.
