= Cyndi Munson =

American politician (born 1985)

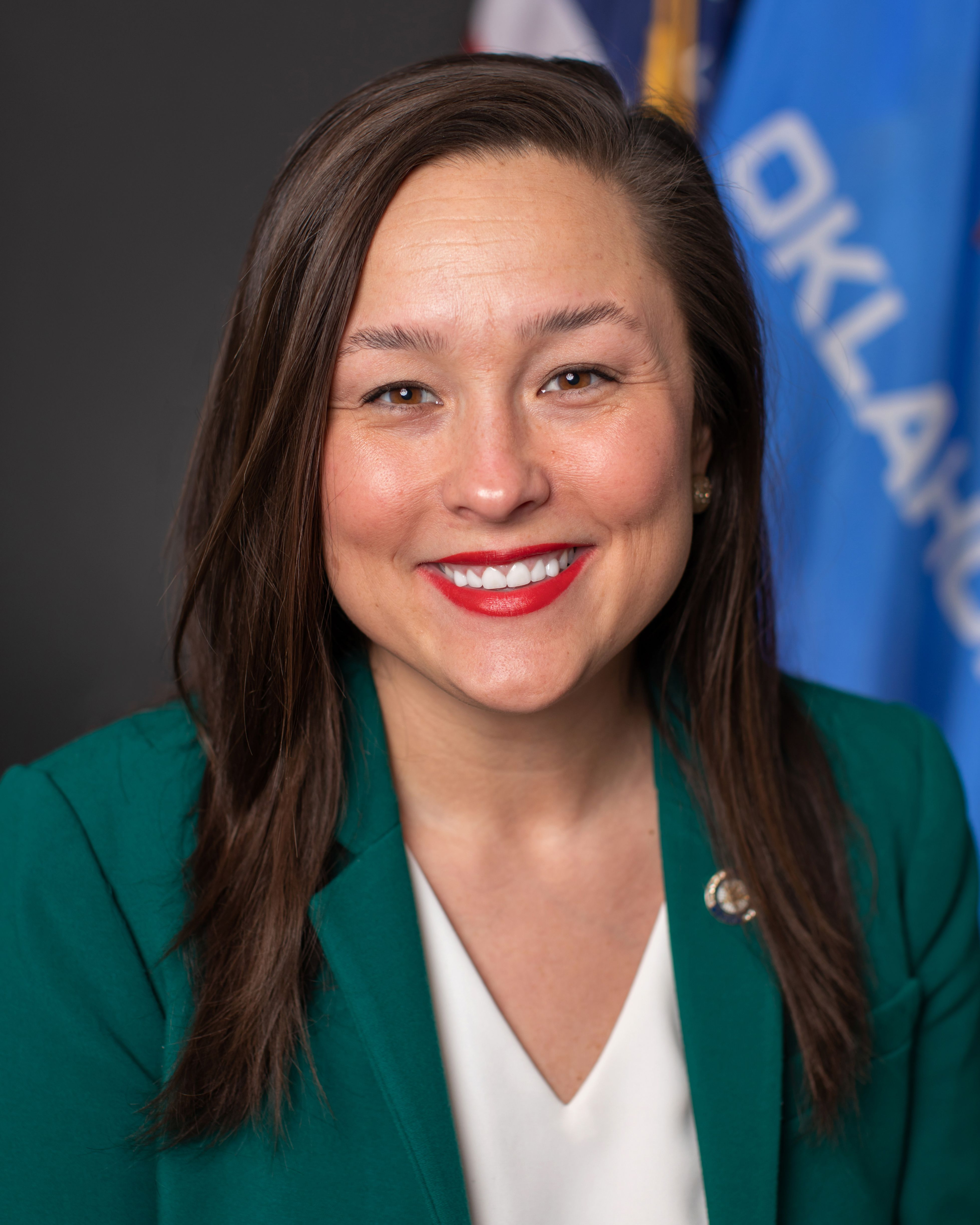
- Official portrait, 2023

Minority Leader of the Oklahoma House of Representatives
- In office November 16, 2022 – November 18, 2026
- Preceded by: Emily Virgin

Member of the Oklahoma House of Representatives from the 85th district
- In office September 17, 2015 – November 18, 2026
- Preceded by: David Dank

Personal details
- Born: Cyndi Ann Munson; May 24, 1985 (age 41) Monterey, California, U.S.
- Party: Democratic
- Education: University of Central Oklahoma (BA); University of Nebraska, Lincoln (MS)
- Website: State house website Campaign website

Cyndi Ann Munson (born May 24, 1985) is an American politician who served as a member of the Oklahoma House of Representatives from the 85th district from 2015 to 2026. A member of the Democratic Party, she has served as minority leader of the Oklahoma House of Representatives from 2022 to 2026.

In 2015, Munson won a special election to replace David Dank, securing over 54% of the vote and becoming the first Asian American woman to serve in the Oklahoma State Legislature. Prior to her election, the district, which includes parts of Oklahoma City, had been held by Republicans. She was the Democratic nominee for governor of Oklahoma in the 2026 election.

== Early life and education ==
Munson was born in Monterey, California, and raised in Lawton, Oklahoma. Munson's father was a Vietnam War veteran who raised her as a single parent; her mother was born in Seoul, South Korea. Her parents divorced when she was 13 years old. Munson became the first in her family to earn a college degree, having attended the University of Central Oklahoma through Oklahoma's Promise, the state's income-based tuition assistance program, where she earned a Bachelor of Arts degree in political science. She later earned a Master of Science in leadership education from the University of Nebraska–Lincoln. As an undergraduate, Munson participated in a program in non-profit and voluntary services at Georgetown University.

== Career ==
Prior to entering politics, Munson worked in the nonprofit sector, including in a community engagement and development role at the OK Messages Project and with the Girl Scouts of Western Oklahoma. Munson first ran for the Oklahoma House of Representatives in 2014, but lost to the incumbent. Munson was elected to the Oklahoma House in 2015, the first Asian American woman to serve in the Oklahoma Legislature. In 2019, Munson was selected to serve on the Oversight Committee for the Legislative Office for Fiscal Transparency. In 2022, Munson succeeded Emily Virgin as minority leader of the Oklahoma House of Representatives. Her legislative record included criminal justice reform efforts, among them a bill to expand financial compensation available to those exonerated after wrongful convictions.

=== 2026 gubernatorial campaign ===
In April 2025, Munson announced her candidacy for Governor of Oklahoma in the 2026 Oklahoma gubernatorial election, becoming the first Democrat to enter the race. If elected, she would be the first Asian American to serve as Governor of Oklahoma, and the first Democrat to win the Oklahoma governorship since Brad Henry was reelected in 2006.

Munson's campaign centered on increasing public school funding and teacher pay, cutting taxes for lower- and middle-income residents, expanding access to healthcare, and repealing Oklahoma's near-total abortion ban. On the abortion issue, she pledged to put a repeal of the legislative ban to voters via ballot referendum, arguing that the ban had contributed to maternity care shortages across the state by discouraging OBGYNs from practicing in Oklahoma. She also pledged to reinstate diversity, equity, and inclusion programs that had been halted by the Republican-controlled legislature, and to continue backing Oklahoma's Medicaid expansion, which voters approved by ballot measure. She also called for the repeal of the state's parental choice tax credit, which allows parents to claim a tax credit of $5,000 to $7,500 for enrolling children in private schools.

Munson raised over $1.1 million in total campaign contributions ahead of the primary, according to state ethics filings. She did not make personal loans to her campaign, instead drawing on individual donor contributions and direct voter contact. The four leading Republican candidates collectively loaned more than $22 million of their own money to their campaigns.

On June 16, 2026, Munson won the Democratic primary with approximately 74.9% of the vote, advancing to the general election against the winner of the Republican primary, Mike Mazzei. She lost to Mazzei in the general election by about six percentage points.

Oklahoma House of Representatives
Preceded by Emily Virgin	Minority Leader of the Oklahoma House of Representatives; 2022–present	Incumbent
Party political offices
Preceded by Joy Hofmeister	Democratic nominee for Governor of Oklahoma; 2026	Most recent
