= Jared Deck =

American politician

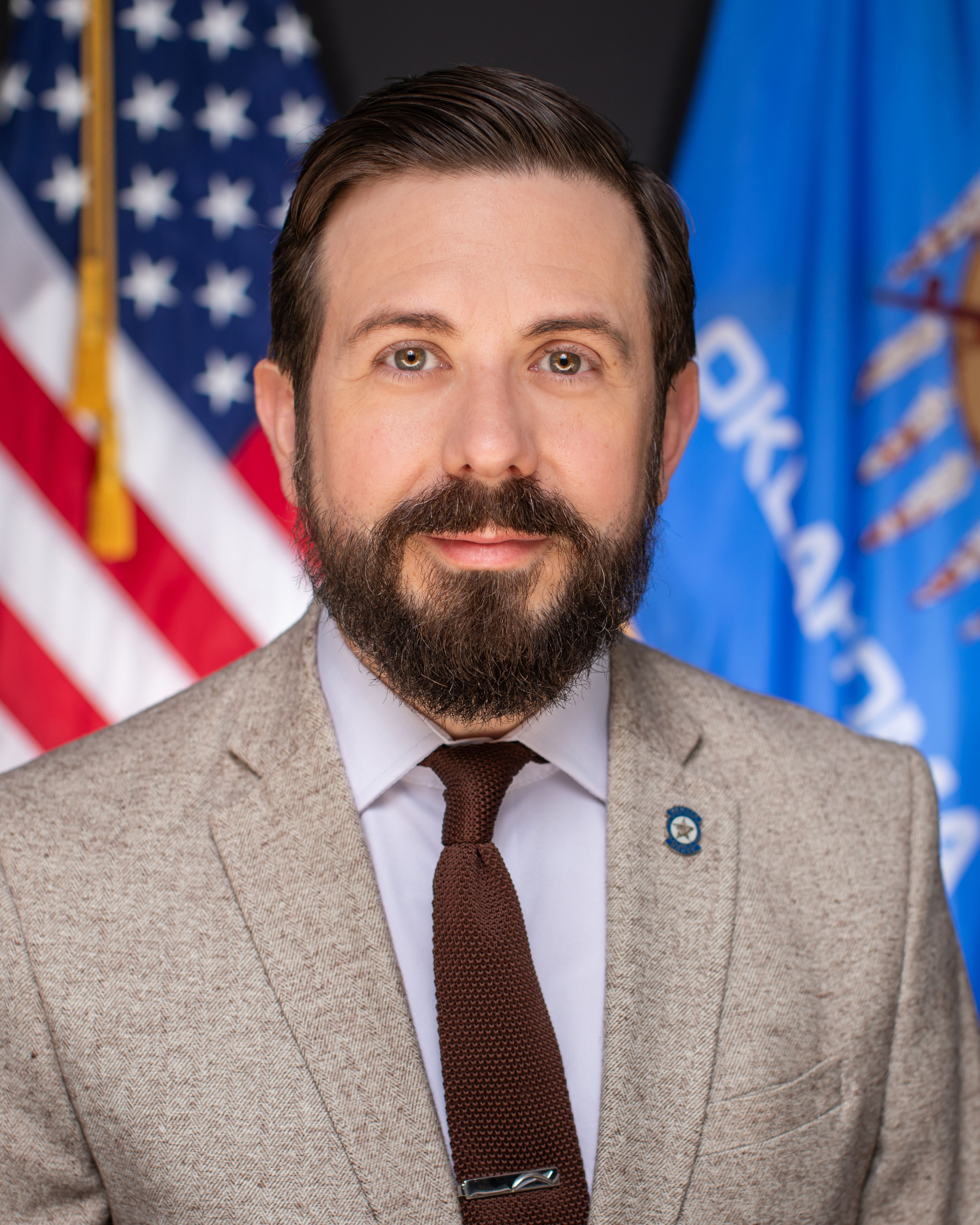

Member of the Oklahoma House of Representatives from the 44th district
- Incumbent
- Assumed office November 16, 2022
- Preceded by: Emily Virgin

Personal details
- Party: Democratic

Jared Deck is an American politician who has served as the Oklahoma House of Representatives member from the 44th district since November 16, 2022.

== Oklahoma House of Representatives ==
Deck announced his campaign for the Oklahoma House of Representatives to succeed Representative Emily Virgin in June 2021. He defeated former Norman city councillor Kate Bierman in the primary for the Democratic Party's nomination and faced Republican RJ Harris in the general election. He won the general election with over 73% of the vote and was sworn in on November 16, 2022.
