= Oklahoma State Bureau of Investigation =

Law enforcement agency

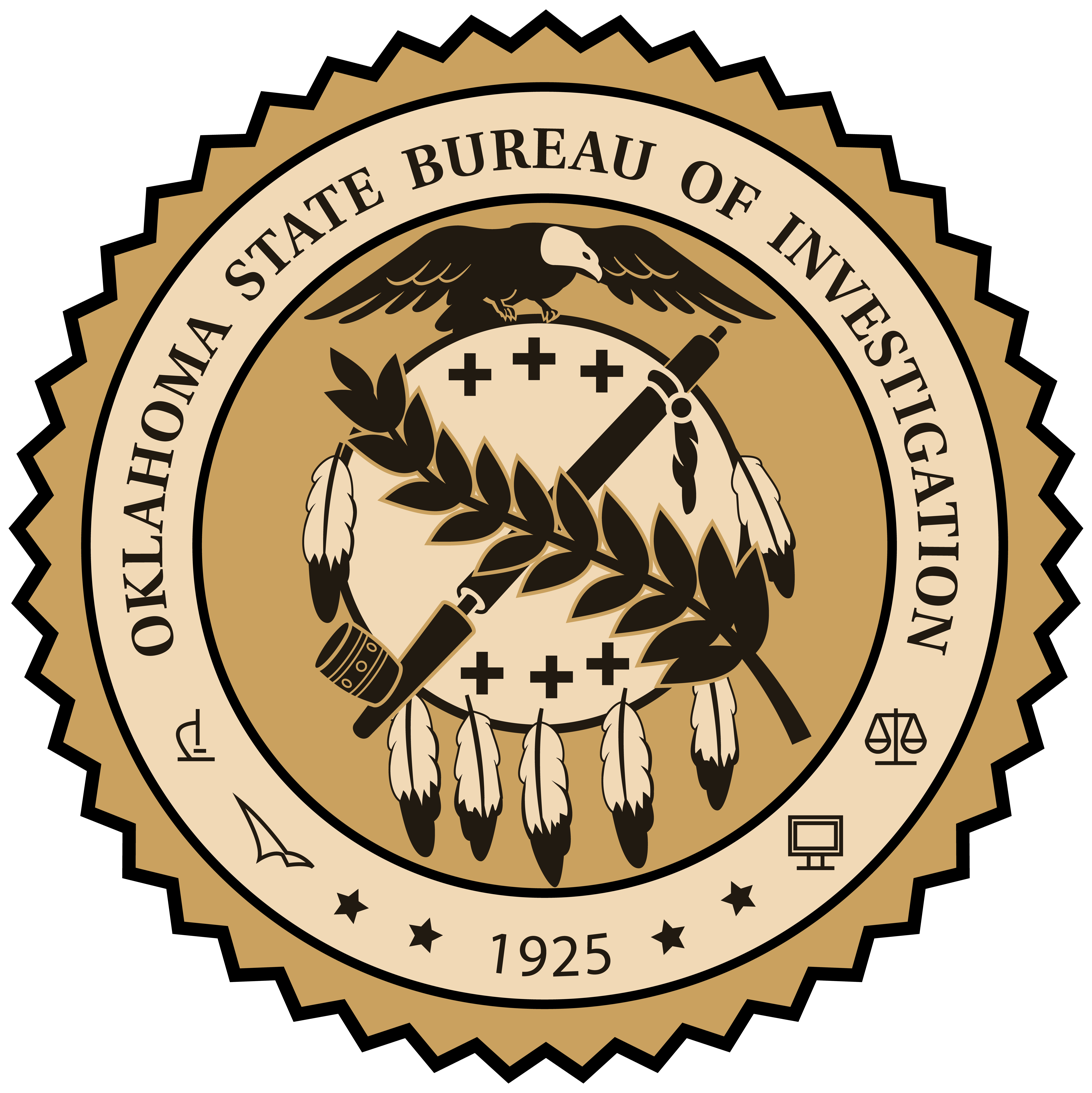
- Oklahoma State Bureau of Investigation Seal

Agency overview
- Formed: 1925
- Headquarters: Oklahoma City, Oklahoma
- Employees: 350 total employees 99 commissioned agents
- Annual budget: $42.9 million
- Minister responsible: Tricia Everest, Oklahoma Secretary of Safety and Security
- Agency executives: Greg Mashburn, Director; Steven Carter, Deputy Director
- Website: Oklahoma State Bureau of Investigation

The Oklahoma State Bureau of Investigation (OSBI) is an independent state law enforcement agency of the government of Oklahoma. The OSBI assists the county sheriff offices and city police departments of the state, and works independent of the Oklahoma Department of Public Safety to investigate criminal law violations within the state at the request of statutory authorized requesters. The OSBI was created in 1925 during the term of Governor Martin E. Trapp.

The OSBI is governed by a seven-member commission, with each member of the commission appointed by the Governor of Oklahoma. The commission then appoints a director, who serves at the pleasure of the commission, as the chief executive officer of the OSBI. The current director is Greg Mashburn and was appointed to serve as Director on March 3, 2025.

== History ==
=== Origins ===
In the early 1920s, gangs of outlaws roamed the state robbing and burglarizing banks and terrorizing the citizens of many Oklahoma towns. These gangsters often escaped lawmen by fleeing across county lines. The United States Marshals Service was the only law enforcement agency with statewide jurisdiction, but its officers were outnumbered by the bandits.

In 1925, Governor of Oklahoma Martin E. Trapp, in his State of the State address recommended the creation of an agency of special investigators or state police to combat the outlaws. The Oklahoma Legislature appropriated $78,000 to establish the Bureau of Criminal Identification and Investigation. A year after its creation, the Bureau's three agents or operatives were credited with reducing the number of bank robberies in the state by roughly 75 percent. Agents accomplished this by developing leads and using informants which were considered by many to be innovative investigative techniques at the time.

In 1939, the Bureau was taken out from under the direction of the Adjutant General's Office and became a division of the Oklahoma Department of Public Safety. It was during these years that the agency became known as the State Crime Bureau. This arrangement lasted until 1957, when the Bureau was placed under the direct control of the Governor's Office and renamed the Oklahoma State Bureau of Investigation. Also in 1957, the OSBI began to emerge as a professional law enforcement agency.

=== Independence ===
In the wake of a controversial investigation of Governor David Hall by the Bureau, the agency was removed from the direct control of the Governor's Office. In 1976, a seven-member independent commission was created to oversee the activities of the OSBI. The makeup of the Commission includes: one police chief, one sheriff, one district attorney and four lay members. These members are appointed by the Governor and approved by the Oklahoma Senate to serve seven year staggered terms. In general, the OSBI Commission appoints the Director, hears complaints, establishes guidelines and serves as a buffer between the Bureau and potential political pressures concerning any particular investigations.

=== 21st Century ===
For almost one hundred years, the OSBI has been utilizing innovative techniques and expertise to solve the most serious crimes in Oklahoma. Supporting investigations across the state of Oklahoma, the OSBI's forensic lab was established in 1953. Continually enhancing the science and technology available for evidence testing, the OSBI achieved accreditation for the laboratory system in 2001. The OSBI maintains the tradition of serving the citizens of Oklahoma as the state's premier law enforcement agency.

On September 11, 2002, the OSBI was recognized as the first Oklahoma state law enforcement agency to be accredited by the Commission on Accreditation for Law Enforcement Agencies.

On July 1, 2009, OSBI assumed the research functions of the Oklahoma Criminal Justice Resource Center and the Oklahoma Sentencing Commission, which were dissolved at that time. OSBI is now officially recognized by the United States Bureau of Justice Statistics as the State Analysis Center.

== Responsibilities ==
The OSBI is responsible for serving as the lead scientific agency for the Oklahoma law enforcement community. The Oklahoma Legislature has directed OSBI to maintain a nationally accredited scientific laboratory to assist all law enforcement agencies in the discovery and detection of criminal activity. As such, OSBI operates the State Forensic Science Center in Edmond and regional Forensic Laboratories/Facilities across the State. OSBI also maintains a Statewide identification system which includes fingerprints, criminal history records, juvenile identification records, and DNA profiles.

OSBI Agents partner with other state, county, and local law enforcement agencies to detect crime. OSBI provides assistance to the Oklahoma Highway Patrol, Oklahoma Bureau of Narcotics, the Oklahoma Chief Medical Examiner, all district attorneys, local sheriff's office, and municipal police departments when assistance is requested. It is the duty of the OSBI to investigate and detect any and all criminal activity when so directed by the Governor of Oklahoma. Typical crimes investigated by OSBI at the request of other agencies are Part 1 Crimes: aggravated assault, forcible rape, murder, robbery, arson, burglary, larceny-theft, and motor vehicle theft.

The OSBI has original jurisdiction over, and may on its own initiative investigate, the following crimes:

- Vehicle and oil field equipment theft
- Criminal threats to public officials
- Computer crimes
- Crimes committed on the State's turnpikes
- Organized crime
- Criminal conspiracies
- Threats of violent crimes

For any crime that OSBI does not have original jurisdiction over, a requesting agency must seek OSBI assistance in order for OSBI to investigate the crime. There are only a limited number of agencies or officials that can request the OSBI to conduct an investigation. They are:

- Police Chiefs
- County Sheriffs
- District Attorneys
- Chief Medical Examiner
- The Attorney General of Oklahoma
- The Governor of Oklahoma
- The Oklahoma Council on Judicial Complaints
- The Director of (or designee of) the Oklahoma Department of Human Services related to child abuse investigations
- Any District Judge related to a child abuse investigations
- The Chair of any committee of the Oklahoma Legislature which has subpoena power

== Leadership ==
The Oklahoma State Bureau of Investigation is under the supervision of the Oklahoma Secretary of Safety and Security. The OSBI Director, who is appointed by the OSBI Commission, has direct control over the OSBI. Under Governor of Oklahoma Kevin Stitt, Tricia Everest is serving as the Secretary and Greg Mashburn is serving as OSBI Director.

=== OSBI Commission ===
OSBI is governed by a seven-member OSBI Commission, with all members being appointed by the Governor of Oklahoma, with the approval of the Oklahoma Senate, to serve seven year terms. Governor may remove any member at any time only for cause. No more than two members of the Commission may reside in the same congressional district. Four members must be ordinary citizens, one must be a sitting district attorney, one must be a sitting county sheriff, and one must be a sitting chief of police.

As of 2023, the current members of the OSBI Commission are:

- Vic Regalado – Chairman, Sheriff member
- Bryan Smith – Vice Chairman lay member
- Angela Marsee – D.A. member
- Edward E. Hilliary, Jr. – Lay member
- Jeff Van Hoose, Lay member
- Jerry N. Cason – Lay member
- Russ Landon - Chief of Police member

=== Rank structure ===
OSBI Special Agent patch

| Title | Description | Comparative OHP rank |
|---|---|---|
| Director | Appointed by the OSBI Commission to be the professional head of the OSBI | OHP Commissioner |
| Deputy Director | The deputy director is appointed by the OSBI Director to serve as second-in-command of the OSBI | OHP Chief |
| Division Directors | The division directors of the Investigative, Forensic Science, Support Services, and Information Services divisions are also appointed by the Director | OHP Colonel |
| Assistant Division Directors | The assistant division directors of the Investigative, Forensic Science, Support Services, and Information Services divisions are also appointed by the Director | OHP Lt. Colonel |
| Special Agent in Charge/Captain | Responsible for directing Regional Offices or a Specialized Unit | OHP Captain |
| Assistant Special Agent in Charge/Lieutenant | Responsible for directing investigations within a Regional Office or Specialized Unit. This is the first level of supervisor | OHP Lieutenant |
| Special Agent III; Criminalist III | Responsible for leading broad, complex, and highly specialized investigations or serving as a resident agent and does not supervise. Investigative badges have "Special Agent" inscribed | OHP Trooper (SGT. Level) |
| Special Agent II; Criminalist II | Responsible for leading investigations and assisting lower-level Agents in the performance of their duties. Investigative badges have "Special Agent" inscribed | OHP Trooper Mid-Grade |
| Special Agent I; Criminalist I | Responsible for field investigative operations or specialized or technical law enforcement functions. Investigative badges have "Special Agent" inscribed | OHP Trooper 3yr |

== Divisions ==
=== Operational Section ===
The Operational Section of the OSBI is organized as follows:

- Legal Division
- Public Information Office
- Investigative Division
- Criminalistics Division

=== Investigative Services Division ===
The OSBI Investigative Services Division is home to the Criminal Intelligence Unit which provides investigative support to the division, as well as home to the Oklahoma State Clearinghouse for the National Center for Missing and Exploited Children.

The Division is divided into six regional investigative offices with geographic based jurisdiction and five headquarters investigative units with functional based authority and State-wide jurisdiction:

Regional Investigative Units

- Northwest Region Office - Woodward
  - Northwest Satellite Office - Weatherford
- Southwest Region Office - Duncan
- North Central Region Office - Stillwater
- South Central Region Office - Headquarters
- Northeast Region Office - Tulsa
  - Northeast Satellite Office - Tahlequah
- Southeast Region Office - McAlester
  - Southeast Satellite Office - Antlers

Headquarters Units

- Internet Crimes Against Children Unit
- Special Investigations Unit
- Crime Scene Investigations Unit
- Sexual Assault / Sexual Assault Kit Initiative (SAKI) Unit
- Crimes Information Unit

=== Criminalistics Services Division ===
Created in 1953, the Oklahoma State Bureau of Investigation's Criminalistics Services Division (CSD) provides services out of two laboratories and three evidence receiving facilities throughout the State with the following services offered: Latent Evidence, Firearms & Toolmarks, Forensic Biology (including CODIS), Trace Evidence, Controlled Substances, and Forensic Toxicology. The laboratories and facilities are:

- Forensic Science Center Laboratory - Edmond, OK
- McAlester Evidence Facility – McAlester, OK
- Northeastern Regional Laboratory – Tahlequah, OK
- Woodward Evidence Facility - Woodward, OK
- Lawton Evidence Facility – Lawton, OK

=== Support Services Section ===
The central business office of OSBI. This section has responsibility for supporting the Director by providing budgeting, procurement and facilities management, human resources, IT services, Information Services, and Professional Standards and Training to the entire Bureau. The Support Services section is organized as follows:

=== Support Services Division ===
==== Accounting and Budget Section ====
The Accounting and Budget Section is responsible for planning and managing the finances of the agency.

==== Procurement and Facilities Section ====
The Procurement and Facilities Section is responsible for purchasing supplies and equipment, establishing and managing contracts, and managing owned and leased facilities. Procurement receives delegated authority for procurement per Title 74 Section 85.3H (Oklahoma Central Purchasing Act) from the Office of Management and Enterprises Services State Purchasing Director.

==== Human Resources Section ====
The Human Resources Section is responsible for all aspects of personnel management, keeping agency management and employees informed of new developments and techniques, researching and preparing human resource policy and procedure.

==== Office of Professional Standards and Training ====
The Office of Professional Standards (OPS) ensures the integrity of OSBI personnel and operations. This is done through the oversight of internal investigations, maintenance and security of complaint and investigative records, research and development of agency policies and procedures, and functional reviews of operating units.

The Training Office coordinates all training for the OSBI. This includes employee attendance at external training events, coordination and development of in-house training courses and events, and maintaining records related to training received and conducted by OSBI personnel. The Training Coordinator evaluates training programs and assists in the development and evaluation of agency training needs. The Training Coordinator is the liaison between the OSBI and CLEET for the purposes of compliance for all commissioned officers employed by the OSBI. It is the responsibility of the Training Office to provide, coordinate, and/or locate training to assist employees in meeting minimum training requirements for supervisory roles as well as commissioned status. The Training Office is the central repository for all agency training conducted by employees and for accreditation of in-house courses.

=== Information Services Division ===
Created in 1991, the Information Services Division was created as the fourth division within the OSBI and is under operational control of a Division Director who is responsible for the coordination of all division programs. Its purpose is to handle the increased demand for information by law enforcement agencies across the state as well as the public.

This division is the central repository for all criminal records in Oklahoma and is responsible for collecting data ranging from statewide crime statistics to information for criminal history checks.

The division is divided into two sections and is organized as follows:

==== Criminal History Section ====
- Criminal History Management Unit (CHMU) – responsible for the creation, maintenance and dissemination of Oklahoma's Criminal History records. CHMU is also responsible for the sealing and expunging of criminal records as the result of court orders.
- Correlation Services Unit (CSU) – in 2019, this unit was implemented specifically for the purpose of improving the accuracy, completeness, and accessibility of non-Triple I criminal history records. In addition, their efforts help to identify persons that may be prohibited from purchasing or possessing firearms due to domestic violence convictions and/or felony convictions.
- Disposition Services Unit (DSU) – this unit's primary responsibility is updating arrest records in the state repository with criminal case disposition data. The state's district attorneys, municipal court clerks, and the Department of Corrections provide the unit with information on charges and the outcome reached for each arrest.

==== Data Collection and Reporting Section ====
- Criminal History Reporting Unit (CHRU) and CHIRP – This unit is responsible for conducting checks of the criminal history database for non-criminal justice purposes at the request of the public. Members of the general public as well as businesses can use the automated Criminal History Information Request Portal (CHIRP) to request a name-based criminal history record check electronically.
- Field Services Unit (FSU) – this unit is responsible for Oklahoma's Uniform Crime Reporting System. State law requires all state, county, city and town law enforcement agencies to submit individual crime incident reports to this system. FSU employees train agencies in the creation, validation, and submittal of individual crime incident reports and provide ongoing program support as well as overseeing the installation, maintenance and upgrades for the Offender Data Information System (ODIS) case management system used by over 300 law enforcement agencies in Oklahoma to track reported crimes and their statistics to the State Incident-Based Reporting System (SIBRS).
- Oklahoma Violent Death Reporting System (OKVDRS) - is a collaborative effort between the Oklahoma State Department of Health, Office of the Chief Medical Examiner, and the OSBI. This national surveillance system collects information on violent deaths to include suicides, homicides, deaths from legal intervention (a subtype of homicide where the victim is killed by or died as a result of law enforcement acting in the line of duty), deaths of undetermined intent, and unintentional firearm fatalities.
- Biometric Field Services Unit (BFSU) – created in 2005 to improve and maintain the efficiency of accurate arrest information submitted to the Oklahoma State Bureau of Investigation (OSBI) by law enforcement agencies. BFSU is responsible for the training and certification of law enforcement agencies in the use of Livescan devices as well as capturing fingerprints using ink. BFSU is also responsible for the Mobile ID system, an investigative tool used by police officers to help make quick identification of individuals of concern by using a two-finger submission that searches both the OSBI AFIS database and the FBI Repository for Individuals of Special Concern (RISC) database.
- Oklahoma Statistical Analysis Center (SAC) – The Oklahoma SAC was created August 1, 1989. Since then, the Oklahoma SAC has been housed at the Oklahoma Department of Corrections, Oklahoma Department of Public Safety, and the Oklahoma Criminal Justice Resource Center. In 2009, the Oklahoma SAC was moved to the Oklahoma State Bureau of Investigation. Functions of the Oklahoma SAC can be found in 22 O.S. § 1517.

==== Fingerprinting, Licensing and Communications Section ====
- Identification Unit (ID) – manages the 10-print portion of the OSBI database of fingerprints (AFIS), examines, and compares fingerprint images to make positive identifications of arrest records entered by CHMU.
- Self-Defense Act Licensing Unit (SDA) – In 1995, the OSBI was given the responsibility to license Oklahoma residents to carry firearms and the SDA unit was formed. The unit is responsible for the management of the licensees and conducts suspensions or revocations for those who commit infractions while licensed. Even though applications for an SDA license have declined since the permitless carry bill (11/1/2019) went in to effect, Oklahoman's can still apply for a permit. One benefit of obtaining a permit is reciprocity, which makes it legal to carry a gun in some other states without needing to obtain a license from each state.
- The Communications Unit (NCIC) - is a 24/7/365 Watch Desk for the OSBI. This unit monitors, assesses and manages requests for information and assistance received by telephone, email, and the OSBI tip lines. They monitor CCTV, alarm systems, and access to the OSBI. They are the first point of contact for visitors and maintain front end security and visitor identification. They also assist with support functions for the Information Services Division and other state agencies as well as internal customers on an as-needed basis.

==== Information Technology Division ====
- IT is responsible for the design, development and deployment of new business applications and continuous support of existing applications for the OSBI. They are also responsible for assessing the needs for required hardware and system products needed to support the infrastructure as well as providing support maintenance, replacement, and inventory of all computer hardware/software for OSBI employees as well as technical assistance to employees, OK law enforcement agencies, and the citizens of Oklahoma.

== Personnel ==
=== Staffing ===
The Oklahoma State Bureau of Investigation, is one of the larger employers of the State.

| Division | Number of Employees |
|---|---|
| Administration | 11 |
| Investigative Services | 123 |
| Criminalistics Services | 111 |
| Information Services | 81 |
| Support Services | 24 |
| Total | 350 |

=== Requirements ===
Per Title 74 O.S. Section 150.8A: In order to be employed as a Law Enforcement Special Agent, an individual must, at the time of employment, “shall be at least twenty-one (21) years of age and shall possess a bachelor's degree from an accredited college or university" and two years of law enforcement experience with a governmental law enforcement agency and must be a certified CLEET peace officer or possess a certification by reciprocity agreement from another state.

=== Pay Structure for Law Enforcement Agents ===
As established by Oklahoma law, the annual salaries for OSBI law enforcement agents are as follows:

Pay Structure
| RANK | STARTING | 5 YRS IN GRADE | 10 YRS IN GRADE | 15 YRS IN GRADE |
|---|---|---|---|---|
| AGENT I | $68,122.50 | | | |
| AGENT II | $80,080.00 | | | |
| AGENT III | $93,587.00 | $96,394.61 | $99,286.45 | $102,265.05 |
| AGENT IV (Lieutenant) | $103,303.25 | $105,781.00 | $108,954.43 | $112,223.06 |
| AGENT V (Captain) | $113,317.10 | $116,091.30 | $119,574.04 | $123,161.26 |
| AGENT VI (Major) | $149,370.00 | | | |

== Budget ==
The Oklahoma State Bureau of Investigation's budget is generated primarily by annual appropriations from the Oklahoma Legislature. Annual appropriations make up 43% ($27.4 million), 39% generated from the fees charged by the Bureau ($24.4 million), and the remaining 18% ($11.7 million) coming from various other sources.

The majority of OSBI's budget (64% or $40.8 million) is spent on employee benefits and salaries, 32% ($20.2 million) goes to operating expenses and the remaining 4% ($2.5 million) is dedicated to various other expenses.

For fiscal year 2023, each of the operating units of the Bureau operate with the following budgets:

| Division | Funding (in millions) |
|---|---|
| Administration Division | $3.9 |
| Investigative Services Division | $22.6 |
| Criminalistics Services Division | $22.5 |
| Information Services Division | $6.6 |
| IT Services | $7.9 |
| Total | $63.5 |

== Fallen officers ==
Since the establishment of the Oklahoma State Bureau of Investigation, 4 officers have died in the line of duty.

| Officer | Date of death | Details |
|---|---|---|
| Agent Luther Bishop | Sunday, December 5, 1926 | Gunfire |
| Agent Crockett Long | Monday, July 18, 1932 | Gunfire |
| Agent Clifford W. Roberts | Tuesday, March 14, 1967 | Struck by train |
| Agent Chester W. Stone | Wednesday, March 11, 1981 | Heart attack |

== See also ==
- Oklahoma Department of Public Safety
- Federal Bureau of Investigation
- State bureau of investigation
