= David Dank =

American politician (1938–2015)

David M. Dank

Member of the Oklahoma House of Representatives from the 85th district
- In office 2007–2015
- Preceded by: Odilia Dank
- Succeeded by: Cyndi Munson

Personal details
- Born: July 14, 1938 Pittsburgh, Pennsylvania, US
- Died: April 10, 2015 (aged 76) Oklahoma City, Oklahoma, US
- Party: Republican
- Spouse: Odilia Dank (married c. 1977-2013, her death)
- Children: One daughter, Trina; Two grandchildren
- Education: Bishop McGuinness High School; University of Oklahoma
- Occupation: Political consultant journalist Insurance agent

David Michael Dank (July 14, 1938 – April 10, 2015) was a Republican member of the Oklahoma House of Representatives from the Nichols Hills section of Oklahoma City, Oklahoma. He held this position from 2007 until his death, succeeding his term-limited wife, Odilia Dank, the first woman to serve as chairman of the House Education Committee, who died in August 2013.

== Early life ==
A native of Pittsburgh, Pennsylvania, Dank graduated from Bishop McGuinness High School in Oklahoma City and attended the University of Oklahoma at Norman.

== Private career ==
Dank was the president of Dank Consulting in Oklahoma City.

Dank was the publisher of the Moore Monitor and the Oklahoma Conservative Review newspapers. He was a political analyst and commentator for KTOK radio, the Oklahoma News Network, and the Oklahoma Educational Television Authority. As an executive vice president of the Oklahoma Retail Merchants Association, Dank worked for passage of his state's consumer credit code and the law requiring photo identity on drivers' licenses. Dank was a member of the Oklahoma City Chamber of Commerce, the Benevolent and Protective Order of Elks, the National Rifle Association of America, and the executive committees of the Republican parties of the state of Oklahoma as well as Oklahoma County. He was a member of Christ the King Catholic Church in Oklahoma City. He had one daughter, Trina, son-in-law, Gale, and two grandchildren, Hannah and Daniel.

David Dank died of a heart attack on April 10, 2015, at his home in Oklahoma City, Oklahoma.

== Political career ==
Dank was the chairman of two House committees: the House Tax Credit and Economic Incentive Oversight, and Long-term Care and Senior Services. He additionally served as chairman of the House and Senate Conference Committee on Long-term Care and Senior Services.
