= North Fork Correctional Facility =

Prison in Oklahoma, United States

North Fork Correctional Center (NFCC)
- Location in Oklahoma
- Location: Sayre, Oklahoma; 35.29391°N 99.61282°W
- Status: Closed
- Security class: Medium and Maximum
- Capacity: 2,520
- Population: 2,075 (April 10, 2017)
- Opened: 1998; 28 years ago
- Managed by: Oklahoma Department of Corrections
- Warden: Jayme Bryant
- Website: Oklahoma Department of Corrections - North Fork Correctional Center

North Fork Correctional Center is a medium to maximum security correctional facility for men located east of Sayre, Beckham County, Oklahoma.

From its opening in 1998 through 2015, the prison was owned and operated by Corrections Corporation of America. From 2006 - 2015, the prison housed prisoners from the California Department of Corrections and Rehabilitation, as part of an effort to relieve California prison overcrowding. After a year of closure starting in 2015, the facility was reopened under lease and has been operated by the Oklahoma Department of Corrections.

It is 1.5 miles (2.4 km) from downtown Sayre.

== History ==
It was built for $37 million. This prison had 1,440 prisoners and 270 employees as of 2001, and that year Peter T. Kilborn of The New York Times wrote that the prison "is responsible for lifting Sayre's spirits and reigniting its economy."

The facility housed just under 1,000 prisoners from the state of Wisconsin until August 2003, when Wisconsin ended the contract over a dispute about high long-distance telephone rates involving the prison contractor, the town of Sayre, and telecommunications provider AT&T. (The prisoners were transferred to CCA's nearby Diamondback Correctional Facility in Watonga, Oklahoma, which was subsequently closed.)

Richard Bice, was named Chief of Security in 2007. He had previously served as the Chief of Security at Camino Nuevo Correctional Facility in Albuquerque, NM and as a Lieutenant and S.O.R.T Commander at Dawson State Jail in Dallas, TX. Prior to that he served as a Major with the Illinois Department of Corrections. He is retired from the United States Army after a 22 year career.

In October 2011 a riot involving inmates from California resulted in 46 prisoners hurt, with 16 of those sent to local hospitals. A subsequent prisoners' lawsuit sought to blame the disturbance on poorly trained guards and "reckless understaffing". In March 2014 inmate Todd Bush was found unresponsive in his cell. His death was ruled a homicide, and his cellmate moved to segregated housing pending an investigation.

CCA closed the facility in 2015 and returned its population, about two thousand inmates, back to California via its private prisons in Mississippi and Arizona with regards to the individual inmates security rating. In 2016 the state struck a deal with CCA that provided for an eighteen-month lease at no cost, and the return of state prisoners to state management as of July 1, 2016. While CCA, now known as CoreCivic, continues to own the facility, the Center has been leased and operated as an Oklahoma Department of Corrections-managed correctional facility.
