= Kevin Wallace (politician) =

American politician and businessman

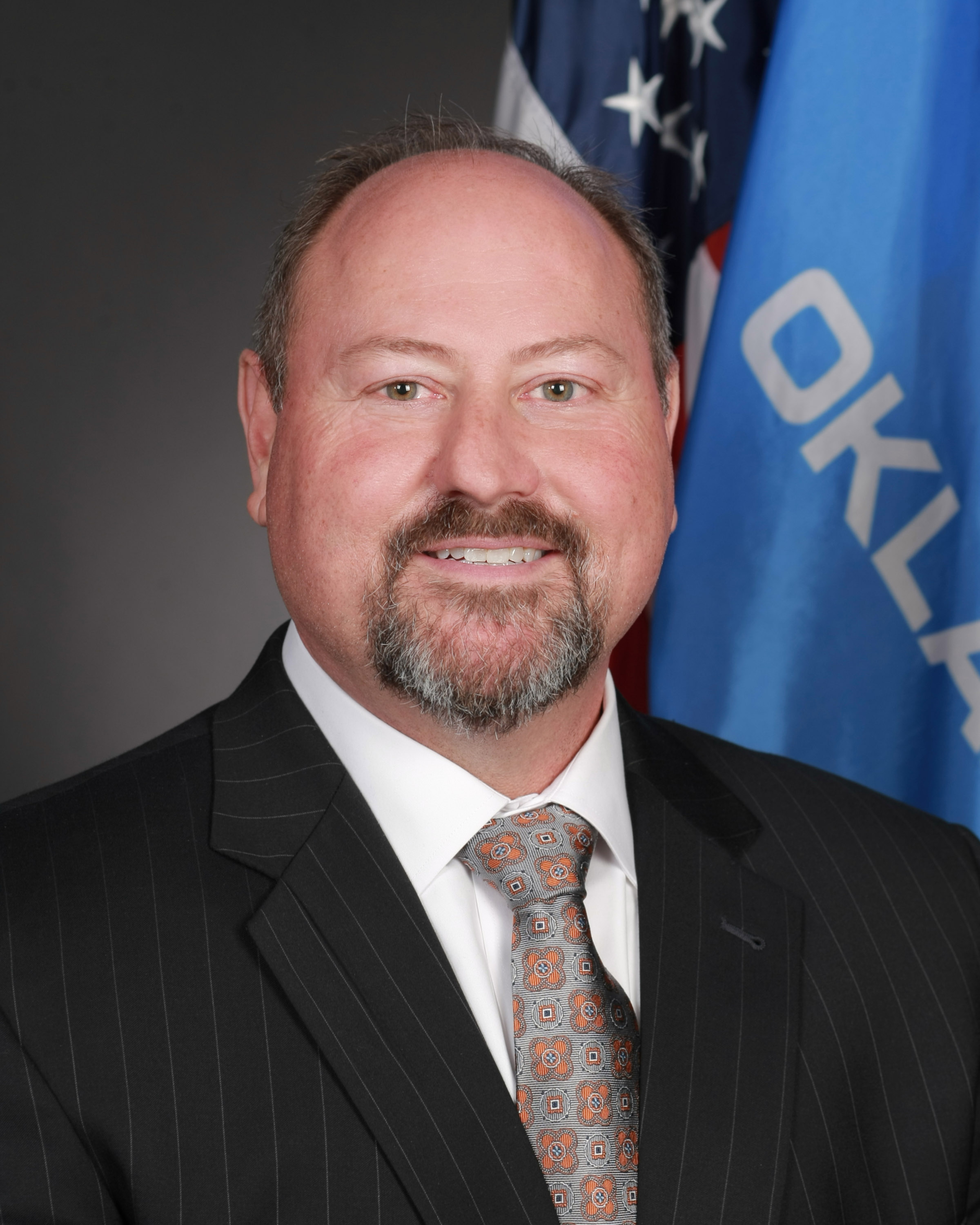

Member of the Oklahoma House of Representatives from the 32nd district
- In office January 12, 2015 – November 20, 2024
- Preceded by: Jason Smalley
- Succeeded by: Jim Shaw

Personal details
- Born: Lincoln County, Oklahoma, U.S.
- Party: Republican
- Education: University of Central Oklahoma (BBA)

Kevin Wallace is an American politician and businessman who served as a member of the Oklahoma House of Representatives representing the 32nd district from 2015 to 2024.

== Early life and education ==
A native of Lincoln County, Oklahoma, Wallace graduated from Wellston High School. He earned a Bachelor of Business Administration from the University of Central Oklahoma in 1993.

== Career ==
After graduating from college, Wallace founded American Cellular Service and Dynatek Development Services. He later founded a construction company, equipment rental company, and investment firm. Wallace was elected to the Oklahoma House of Representatives in November 2014 and assumed office on January 12, 2015. He serves as chair of the House Appropriations and Budget Committee. He was re-elected by default in 2020.
