= Davis Correctional Facility =

Prison in Oklahoma, United States

Coordinates: 35°05′22″N 96°26′38″W

- Interactive map of Davis Correctional Facility
- Location: E W 133 Road Holdenville, Oklahoma
- Status: open
- Security class: medium/maximum
- Capacity: 1600
- Opened: 1996
- Managed by: CoreCivic

Davis Correctional Facility is a 1600-bed, medium/ maximum security prison for men located in Holdenville, Oklahoma. It is owned and run by CoreCivic under contract with the Oklahoma Department of Corrections.
