= Dick Conner Correctional Center =

Correctional Facility in Hominy, Oklahoma

Dick Conner Correctional Center (DCCC)
- Location in Oklahoma
- Location: Hominy, Oklahoma; 36.4685°N 96.3945°W
- Status: Operational
- Security class: Medium with a minimum unit
- Capacity: 1,167
- Population: 1,210 (Sept. 12, 2024)
- Opened: 1979; 47 years ago
- Managed by: Oklahoma Department of Corrections
- Warden: Scott Tinsley
- Website: Oklahoma Department of Corrections-Dick Conner Correctional Center

Dick Conner Correctional Center is an Oklahoma Department of Corrections state prison for men located north of the town of Hominy, Osage County, Oklahoma. The medium-security facility opened in 1979 with an original design capacity of 400, and is named for former Oklahoma State Penitentiary warden and Osage County sheriff R.B. "Dick" Conner.

== History ==
Conner was the site of a significant prison riot on August 29, 1983. A delay in an inmate count developed into a shift in the evening food service schedule, which in turn developed into food shortages. As inmates became more angry and belligerent, they defied an attempt to lock down the facility, then 400 to 500 prisoners started breaking windows, throwing rocks, and setting fires. By the time order was restored one inmate was dead from a bullet wound, two correctional officers had been injured, and $3 million in damage had been done.

== Notable prisoners ==
- John Marion Grant – convicted of stabbing a kitchen supervisor while incarcerated at the facility; executed in 2021.
- Triple killer Lawrence Anderson was convicted of butchering three people in 2021.
