= Justice Research and Statistics Association =

U.S. nonprofit organization

- Abbreviation: JRSA
- Founded: 1976; 50 years ago
- Tax ID no.: 52-1130140
- Legal status: 501(c)(3) nonprofit organization
- Headquarters: 720 7th Street NW, Third Floor, Washington, D.C. 20001, United States
- Coordinates: 38.899226°N 77.022148°W
- President, Executive Committee: George Shaler
- Executive Director: Jeffrey Sedgwick, PhD
- Revenue: $1,188,212 (2016)
- Expenses: $1,229,971 (2016)
- Employees: 11 (2015)
- Website: www.jirn.org

Justice Research and Statistics Association (JRSA) is a national nonprofit organization of state Statistical Analysis Centers, researchers, and practitioners throughout government, academia, and justice organizations. Justice Research and Statistics Association's members form a network of justice professionals dedicated to policy-relevant research and practice.

== Overview ==
The association was created in 1974 to promote cooperation and the exchange of criminal justice information among the states. JRSA is a 501(c)(3) nonprofit organization.

In 2023, the association changed its name to the Justice Information Resource Network "to better highlight the information resources available to members of the criminal justice community".

Statistical Analysis Centers contribute to viable, effective policy development in their states through statistical services, research, evaluation, and policy analysis. Through the United States Bureau of Justice Statistics' State Justice Statistics Program, Statistical Analysis Centers also undertake statistical research and analysis on themes selected by Bureau of Justice Statistics and JRSA that reflect issues of current concern and significance to the justice community.

JRSA collects information annually in a computerized index called the Infobase of State Activities and Research on Statistical Analysis Centers' research, analyses, and activities, as well as reports and publications.

JRSA publishes The Forum, a quarterly newsletter, and Justice Research and Policy, a semiannual peer-reviewed journal.

JRSA conducts multi-state research on statewide and system-wide problems and practices.

Justice professionals share information and hear about new research, programs, and technologies at conferences convened by JRSA.

== Training ==
JRSA provides training and technical assistance to justice-related organizations on a wide range of topics, such as automated systems planning and management; crime analysis, including spatial analysis of crime data and analysis of incident-based data; valuation and research methods; and computer technologies for records management, data analysis, and forecasting. Justice Research and Statistics Association has also advised agencies that award and manage grants, such as the Office of Justice Programs.

== See also ==
- SEARCH, The National Consortium for Justice Information and Statistics
