= Chief James Smith Correctional Center =

Prison in Oklahoma, United States

Coordinates: 34°31′27″N 98°21′17″W

- Interactive map of Chief James Smith Correctional Center
- Location: 8607 SE Flower Mound Road Lawton, Oklahoma
- Status: medium / maximum
- Capacity: 2,682
- Opened: 1998
- Managed by: Oklahoma Department of Corrections

Chief James Smith Correctional Center is a prison for men located in Lawton, Comanche County, Oklahoma, operated by the Oklahoma Department of Corrections (ODOC).

The facility was opened in 1998 as the Lawton Correctional Center, built and operated by private company GEO Group, under contract with ODOC.

The facility has a capacity of 2,682 inmates, held in a mix of medium and maximum security levels.

In 2025, ODOC purchased the facility from GEO Group for $312 million and announced that it would be renamed Red Rock Correctional Center. As of that time, there were no further privately operated prisons in the state.

In July 2026, ODOC again renamed the facility, in honor of former Lawton Police Chief James Smith.
