= Charles E. Johnson Correctional Center =

Men's prison in Oklahoma, United States

Charles E. "Bill" Johnson Correctional Center (BJCC)
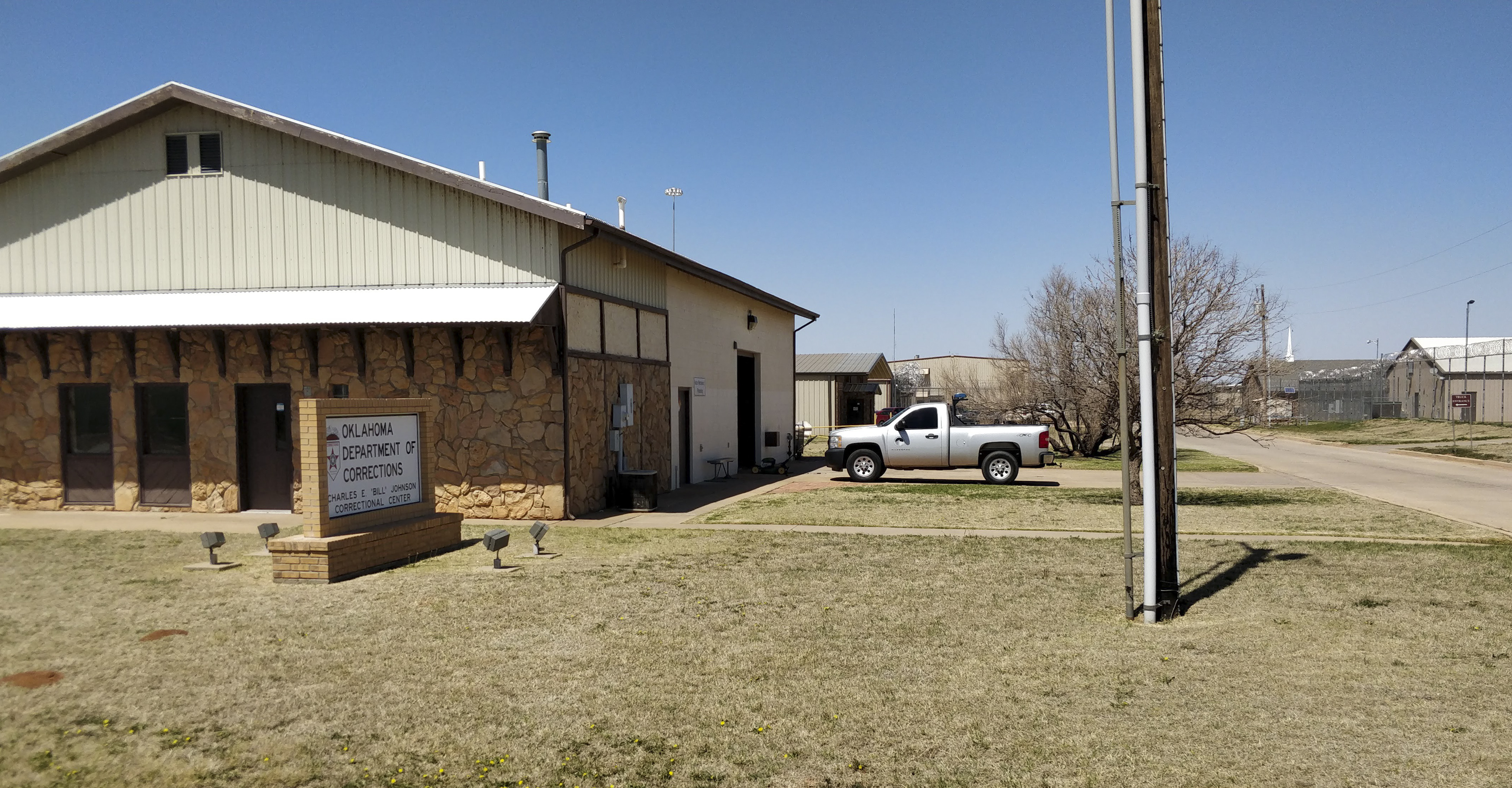

- Location in Oklahoma
- Location: Alva, Oklahoma; 36.8050°N 98.6326°W
- Status: Operational
- Security class: Minimum
- Capacity: 601
- Population: 548 (September 9, 2024)
- Opened: 1995
- Managed by: Oklahoma Department of Corrections
- Warden: Becky Guffy (March 2017)
- Website: Oklahoma Department of Corrections - Charles E. "Bill" Johnson Correctional Center

Charles E. Johnson Correctional Center (also known as the Bill Johnson Correctional Center, or BJCC) is an Oklahoma Department of Corrections state prison for men located in Alva, Woods County, Oklahoma.

BJCC is the newest of the Oklahoma DOC's 17 institutions, opened in 1995, and expanded in 2011–2012. The center is a dedicated substance abuse/cognitive behavior program facility for felony drug offenders 18–23 years old and first time nonviolent offenders. Judges can place inmates into the program, which rewards the inmate with a deferred sentence upon completion. After inmates complete the delayed sentencing program a judge can commute the remainder of their recommended sentences to parole.

The BJCC facility has the distinction of leading Oklahoma State prison facilities with an average of 300 GED completions by inmates per year.

Approximately 100 inmates housed at the facility are general population inmates that do not participate in the abuse/cognitive behavior program and are occupying space previously constructed for the prison's career tech program.

In a 2016 interview, Warden Janice Melton, reported "about 85 percent of the inmates who complete the program are able to stay out of prison after they are released."
