= Jim Shaw (Oklahoma politician) =

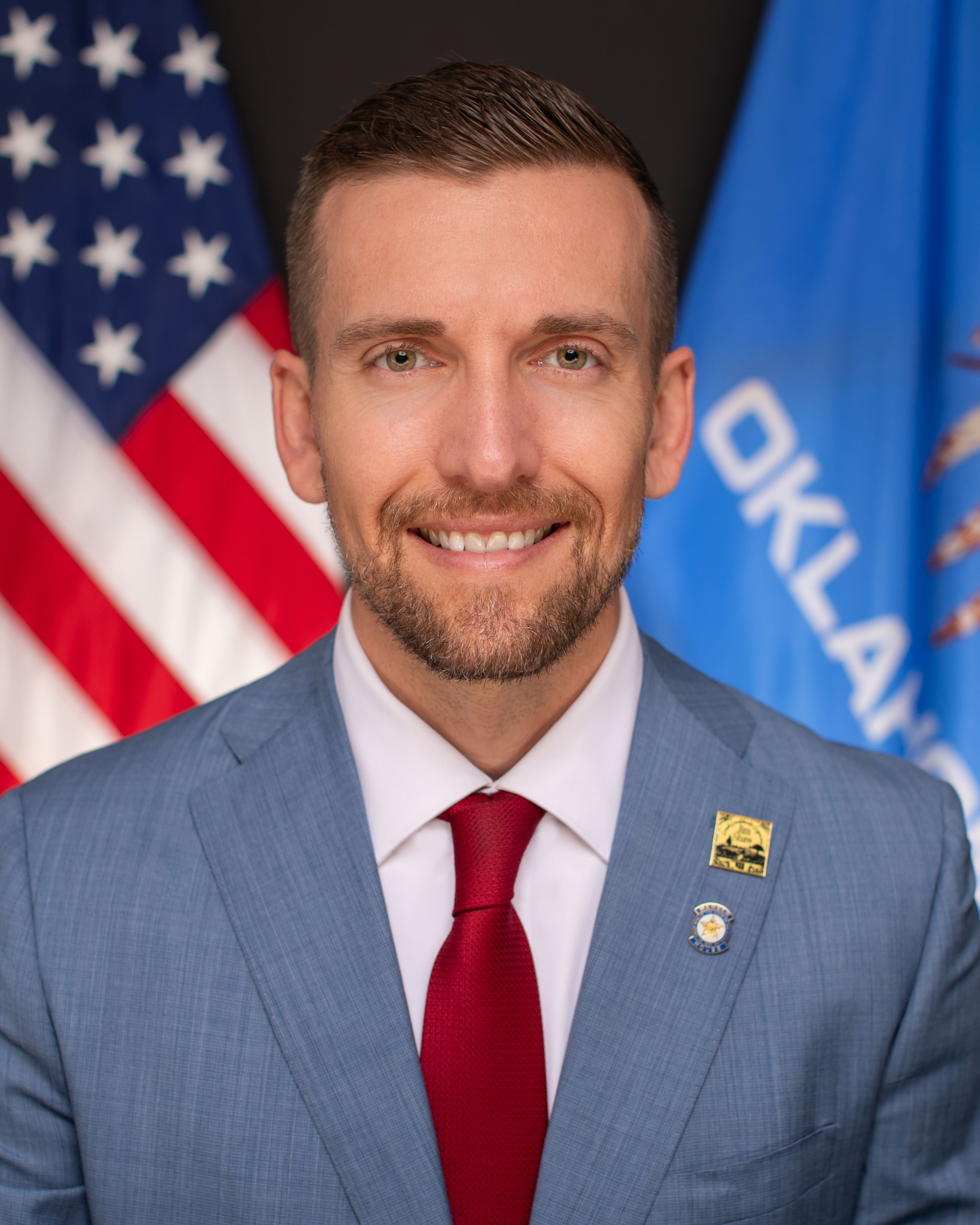
- Shaw in 2024

Member of the Oklahoma House of Representatives from the 32nd district
- Incumbent
- Assumed office November 20, 2024
- Preceded by: Kevin Wallace

Personal details
- Born: Oklahoma City, Oklahoma, U.S.
- Party: Republican
- Education: Oklahoma State University

Jim Shaw is an American politician who has served in the Oklahoma House of Representatives representing the 32nd district since 2024.

== Education and career ==
Jim Shaw was born in Oklahoma City and graduated from Putnam City High School. He graduated from Oklahoma State University in 2006. He met his wife in college and they homeschool their children. Shaw works in the oil and gas industry. He moved to Chandler in 2021.

== Oklahoma House ==
Shaw ran in the Republican primary against incumbent representative Kevin Wallace for the Oklahoma House of Representatives 32nd district. He placed first in the primary with 45% of the vote to Wallace's 41%, forcing a runoff between the two and eliminating candidate Jason Shilling. Shaw declined to participate in a runoff debate, but defeated Wallace in the August runoff election. He campaigned on anti-green energy policies and opposed biosolids. The Tulsa World reported his campaign was supported by "West Texas-based interests." With over $1.1 million spent during the primary, it is the most expensive Oklahoma House of Representatives race in state history. The general election was canceled since no non-Republican filed for the office. He was sworn in on November 20, 2024. He linked his win to opposition to wind energy development in the district.
