= Camino Nuevo Correctional Center =

Women's prison in New Mexico, US

Coordinates: 35.12085°N 106.63196°W

- Interactive map of Camino Nuevo Correctional Center
- Location: New Mexico
- Opened: July 2006
- Closed: April 2008
- Managed by: Corrections Corporation of America (CCA)

The Camino Nuevo Correctional Center was a women's low-security pre-release prison for incarcerated New Mexico female felons. It was located on the grounds of the New Mexico Youth Diagnostic and Development Center, which houses the most violent youth incarcerated in the New Mexico Corrections Department, which is administered by the New Mexico Children, Youth, and Families Department (CYFD).

Camino Nuevo was administered by Corrections Corporation of America (CCA) for the New Mexico Corrections Department. It opened in July 2006 (19 years ago), and closed at the end of April 2008 (18 years ago) because of dwindling inmate populations.

In February 2012 three former inmates of Camino Nuevo were awarded more than $3 million in damages by a federal jury, related to accusations of rape and negligent supervision on the part of CCA.
