= Oklahoma Secretary of Public Safety =

- Great Seal of Oklahoma

Agency overview
- Formed: June 6, 1986
- Headquarters: 3600 N Martin Luther King; Oklahoma City, Oklahoma
- Employees: 9,764 (FY2011)
- Annual budget: $1.2 billion (FY2011)
- Minister responsible: Tricia Everest, Secretary of Public Safety
- Child agencies: Oklahoma Department of Public Safety; Oklahoma Department of Corrections; Oklahoma Department of Emergency Management; Oklahoma State Bureau of Investigation; Oklahoma Bureau of Narcotics
- Website: Office of the Secretary of Public Safety

The Oklahoma Secretary of Public Safety is a member of the Oklahoma Governor's Cabinet. The Secretary is appointed by the Governor, with the consent of the Oklahoma Senate, to serve at the pleasure of the Governor. The Secretary serves as the chief advisor to the Governor on public safety and criminal justice.

The current Secretary is Tricia Everest who was appointed by Governor Kevin Stitt in 2021.

== Overview ==
The Secretary of Public Safety was established in 1986 to provide greater oversight and coordination to the public safety and criminal justice activities of the State government. The position was established, along with the Oklahoma Governor's Cabinet, by the Executive Branch Reform Act of 1986. The Secretary advises the Governor on public safety policy and advises the state's public safety agencies on new policy as directed by the Governor. The Secretary also provides the overarching management structure for the state's criminal justice agencies in order to deliver improved public services while eliminating redundancies and reducing support costs in order to more effectively and efficiently run the agencies in a unified manner.

The Secretary is responsible for overseeing State police services, criminal investigations, criminal justice and adult criminal corrections. The Secretary also coordinates the State's justice system by overseeing all state prosecutors and generally maintains public order throughout the State through oversight of all State law enforcement agencies. Homeland security, emergency management and law enforcement training are also overseen by the Secretary. The Secretary serves ex officio as the Governor's Representative for Highway Safety. As such, the Secretary is responsible for administering all funds from the National Highway Traffic Safety Administration for the purposes of promoting highway safety.

Oklahoma state law allows for Cabinet Secretaries to serve concurrently as the head of a State agency in addition to their duties as a Cabinet Secretary. Historically, the Secretary of Public Safety has also served as the Commissioner of the Oklahoma Department of Public Safety. However, the current Secretary Chip Keating does not share this role, with the position Commissioner currently filled by Rusty Rhoades.

The Secretary, unless filling an additional role which carries a greater salary, is entitled to annual pay of $85,000.

== Reporting officials ==
Officials reporting to the Secretary include:

Office	Officeholder	Since
Attorney General	Gentner Drummond	2023
Director, Alcoholic Beverage Laws Enforcement Commission	Brandon Clabes	2022
Director, State Bureau of Investigation	Steven Carter	2025
Director, State Bureau of Narcotics	Donnie Anderson	2020
Chief Medical Examiner	Dr. Eric Pfeifer	2011
Executive Director, Council on Law Enforcement Education and Training	Darry Stacy	2023
Director, Department of Corrections	Steven Harpe	2022
Director, Department of Emergency Management	Annie Mack-Vest	2024
Commissioner, Department of Public Safety	Tim Tipton	2021
Executive Coordinator, District Attorneys Council	Kathryn Brewer	2022
Director, Office of Homeland Security	Rohit Rai	2024
Executive Director, Indigent Defense System	Tim Laughlin	2024
State Fire Marshall	G. Keith Bryant	2021
Executive Director, Pardon and Parole Board	Tom Bates	2020

== Budget ==
The Secretary of Public Safety oversees a budget for Fiscal Year 2020 of $1 billion. The budget authorization is broken down as follows:

Agency	Funding (in millions)	Employees (in FTEs)
Criminal Justice
Office of the Attorney General	38.3	207
District Attorneys Council	125.2	1,081
Indigent Defense System	19.6	109
SUBTOTAL	183.1	1,397
Law Enforcement
Alcoholic Beverage Law Enforcement Commission	3.6	31
Department of Public Safety	184.3	1,424
Bureau of Narcotics and Dangerous Drugs Control	20	143
State Bureau of Investigation	37.6	318
Office of the State Fire Marshall	2.8	23
SUBTOTAL	248.3	1,939
Corrections
Pardon and Parole Board	2.2	23
Department of Corrections	548.9	4,181
SUBTOTAL	551.1	4,204
Science and Training
Council on Law Enforcement Education and Training	6.3	40
Office of Chief Medical Examiner	12.1	94
SUBTOTAL	18.4	134
Emergency Management
Department of Emergency Management	7.2	30
SUBTOTAL	7.2	30
TOTAL	$1,008	7,704

== List of secretaries ==
#	Name	Took office	Left office	Governor served under
	Bob Ricks	1995	2003	Frank Keating
	Bob Ricks	2003	2004	Brad Henry
	Kevin L. Ward	2004	2011	Brad Henry
	Michael C. Thompson	2011	2017	Mary Fallin
	Rusty Rhoades	2017	2019	Mary Fallin
	Chip Keating	2019	2020	Kevin Stitt
	Tricia Everest	2021	Present	Kevin Stitt
