= Oklahoma Department of Public Safety =

Agency overview
- Formed: April 20, 1937; 89 years ago
- Headquarters: 3600 N Martin Luther King Avenue Oklahoma City, Oklahoma
- Employees: 1,462 (FY20)
- Annual budget: $185 million (FY20)
- Minister responsible: Tricia Everest, Secretary of Public Safety
- Agency executive: Tim Tipton, Commissioner
- Child agency: Oklahoma Highway Patrol (OHP)
- Website: www.dps.state.ok.us

The Oklahoma Department of Public Safety (ODPS) is a department of the government of Oklahoma. Under the supervision of the Oklahoma Secretary of Public Safety, DPS provides for the safety of Oklahomans and the administration of justice in the state. DPS is responsible for statewide law enforcement, vehicle regulation, homeland security and such other duties as the Governor of Oklahoma may proscribe.

The Department is led by the Commissioner of Public Safety. The Commissioner is appointed by the Governor of Oklahoma, with the approval of the Oklahoma Senate, to serve at his pleasure. The current Commissioner is Tim Tipton, who was appointed by Governor Kevin Stitt on September 10, 2021.

The Department of Public Safety was created during the term of Governor E. W. Marland.

== History ==
The Department of Public Safety traces its history almost as far back as statehood.

In 1912, there were only sixty-five hundred automobiles in the entire state. But by 1929, over 600,000 vehicles were being driven up and down state roads. Oklahoma had become a state on wheels, although the roads those wheels were rolling over were designed for horse and buggy travel. One clear indication of the arrival of the automobile age in Oklahoma was the shocking number of people killed in vehicular accidents - about five hundred a year by the mid-1920s.

The automobile also brought many of the nation's most infamous criminals into Oklahoma's borders. By the 1930s, Oklahoma became a criminal haven in much the same fashion as it was in its days as Indian Territory. The odds were stacked in the favor of the criminals as once across the county line, they were beyond the reach of local authorities. Criminals soon discovered that the same system of law enforcement that was powerless to halt the rising tide of traffic fatalities was equally inept at stopping them.

Governor E.W. Marland, the 10th Governor of Oklahoma, made a bid for a state police to the legislation and called it the Department of Public Safety. Marland prevailed over the hesitant legislation on April 20, 1937. In early May 1937 he had the basic framework on paper and issued a statewide call for recruits to become Oklahoma's first highway patrolmen. About five hundred men answered the call. In the hard times of the Depression, the one hundred and fifty dollars a month salary was very attractive. By July 15, 1937 the Department of Public Safety was a functioning agency.

== Leadership ==
The Department is overseen by the Oklahoma Secretary of Public Safety and is administered by the Commissioner of Public Safety. Under Governor Kevin Stitt, Chip Keating is serving as Secretary of Safety and Security and John Scully is serving as Commissioner.

Office	Incumbent	Since
Cabinet Secretary	Tricia Everest	2021
Commissioner	Tim Tipton	2021
Assistant Commissioner	Brent S. Jones	2024
Chief of the Highway Patrol	Pat Mayes	2021
Director of Highway Safety	Paul Harris	2017
Director of Homeland Security	Rohit Rai	2024

== Organization ==
The Commissioner of Public Safety is appointed by the Governor with the advice and consent of the Oklahoma Senate to serve at the pleasure of the Governor.

The Commissioner must be a professional law enforcement officer with at least 10 years experience in the field of law enforcement or with five years experience in the field of law enforcement and be a graduate of a four-year college with a degree in law enforcement administration, law, criminology or a related science.

The Commissioner appoints two principal deputies: an Assistant Commissioner of the Department and a Chief of the Oklahoma Highway Patrol.

The Assistant Commissioner is the second in succession of the Department and is responsible for overseeing the civilian management staff of the Department. The Assistant Commissioner is also responsible for operations of Driver License Administration.

The Highway Patrol Chief serves as the professional head of the Patrol and is responsible for the capabilities, plans and operations of the Patrol.

Operationally, the Assistant Commissioner and Chief serve as equals with the Assistant Commissioner focused on administrative functions and the Chief of Patrol serving as the primary law enforcement head.

=== Divisions ===
- Administrative Services - The Administrative Services Division provides support and management in the areas of wrecker services, finances, information services, legal, records management, human resources, property management, and size and weights permits.
  - Wrecker Services Division - The Wrecker Services Division is responsible for the licensing and governance of wrecker or towing services. The division provides notification to owners and lien holders of the location of vehicles impounded at the request of law enforcement agencies within the state, and receives and maintains records of vehicles impounded from private property and of vehicles stored over thirty days by wrecker or towing services.
  - Finance Division - The Finance Division is responsible for paying the bills of the Department within its approved budget and accounting for and depositing receipts collected for fees, fines, penalties, and other monies as provided by law. The Division also processes sales of surplus and forfeited property, overseeing all purchases made by the Department, and for coordinating the Department's budget
  - Information Systems Division - Oversees, operates, and administers all IT oriented systems on the DPS network
  - Legal Division - The Legal Division provides legal services for the Department and administratively enforces Oklahoma's implied consent law
  - Records Management Division - The Records Management Division is the designated repository for all official traffic accident reports and records required to be submitted by law enforcement officers of municipal, county and state agencies, and for court abstracts and other records concerning motor vehicle and related convictions and offenses required to be reported by municipal and district courts. This division also ensures that appropriate entries from the above documents are made to the respective individual driver's record master file. This division is also responsible for providing documents available to the public under the provisions of the Oklahoma Open Records Act
  - Human Resources Division - The Human Resources Division is responsible for overseeing the personnel needs of the Department and serves as a liaison to the Oklahoma Office of Personnel Management
  - Property Management Division - The Property Management Division is responsible for management and maintenance of all properties under the control of the Department
  - Size and Weight Permits Division - Title 47 of the Oklahoma Statutes states that the commissioner of the Department of Public Safety is responsible for the issuance of oversize and overweight permits via an online permitting system.
- Oklahoma Law Enforcement Telecommunications System Division - The Oklahoma Law Enforcement Telecommunications System (OLETS) is a statewide telecommunications network which serves city, county, state, federal, and military law enforcement and criminal justice agencies in Oklahoma. 800 megahertz is the DPS portion of OKWIN (800 MHz trunking network) where DPS maintains 34 out of a total of 48 sites. This system is used and needed by all local, state, federal and tribal public safety entities for radio communications. The goal of the system is to expand coverage statewide for operable and inter-operable radio communications for all public safety entities in the state. OLETS also provides computer interfaces with several state and national agencies and organizations.
- Driver License Services
  - Driver License Examining Division - The Driver License Examining Division issues permits for driver education instructors, administers tests for the purpose of issuing driver licenses, and provides administrative services related to the issuance and renewal of driver licenses and identification cards
  - Driver Compliance Division - The Driver Compliance Division may suspend, deny, cancel, revoke, or disqualify individual driving privileges, subject to statutory authorization. The Division is also charged with enforcement of the provisions of driver financial responsibility laws and the State's Compulsory Insurance Law.
  - Commercial Driver License Program Administration - The CDL Program Administration is responsible for licensing and regulating commercial drivers, including driver qualification, Hazardous Materials Endorsement Threat Assessment Program, and the licensing of truck driver training institutions.
  - Identity Verification Unit - The Identity Verification Unit is responsible for investigating and apprehending violators of State identification laws and those residing unlawfully in the State
- Oklahoma Highway Patrol - The Oklahoma Highway Patrol provides safety and protection for the citizens on the highways of Oklahoma and other specialized law enforcement services
  - Field troops - Field troops of the Highway Patrol have primary law enforcement authority on state, federal, and interstate highways, excluding those portions within city limits.
  - Turnpike troops - Turnpike troops of the Highway Patrol have sole law enforcement authority on the turnpikes of this state.
  - Specialty troops - Specialty troops of the Highway Patrol perform specialized law enforcement functions within the scope of the mission and operation of the Department of Public Safety, including:
    - Commercial Vehicle Enforcement Section - The Commercial Vehicle Enforcement Section has the primary duty of enforcing the provisions of the size, weight and load laws and rules.
    - Lake Patrol Section - The Lake Patrol Section has the primary duty of enforcing state boat registration laws, boating and water safety laws, federal regulations, and rules pertaining to Oklahoma lakes, rivers and adjacent shores.
    - Capitol Patrol Section - The Capitol Patrol Section has the primary duty of providing law enforcement services to all state buildings and properties within Oklahoma County, including the State Capitol Park, and Tulsa County, including the State Capitol Complex, and enforcing all parking, traffic, and criminal laws within the boundaries of Oklahoma and Tulsa Counties
    - Bomb Squad Section - The Bomb Squad Section has the primary duty of enforcing the laws and regulations related to the construction, transportation and usage of explosives not within the jurisdiction of another state agency.
    - Executive Security Section - The Executive Security Section is responsible for providing for the personal protection of the Governor, the Governor's family, the Lieutenant Governor and the Governor's Mansion.
  - Communications Division - The Communications Division is the link between the general public and public safety services provided by the Department and other law enforcement agencies or emergency providers. These services may be obtained by 911 emergency telephone services or in person at any of the thirteen Field Troop Headquarters statewide.
  - Transportation Division - The Transportation Division is responsible for the purchase, repair, and disposal of all Department vehicles. Repairs may be done at private facilities or at the Department garage with funding coordinated by the Division. Department vehicles are disposed of by sale to other law enforcement agencies in Oklahoma or by public auction.
  - Public Information Office - The Public Information Office acts as the liaison between the Department and the public, the media, and other city, county, state, and federal agencies. Information provided includes traffic safety campaigns, press releases, traffic statistics, road conditions, and services provided by each of the Department's divisions.
  - Oklahoma Office of Homeland Security - The Oklahoma Homeland Security Act of 2004 outlined the Oklahoma Office of Homeland Security’s strategic objectives, which include the following: 1) prevent a terrorist attack in Oklahoma; 2) reduce Oklahoma’s vulnerability to terrorist attacks; and 3) minimize the damage from and respond to a terrorist attack should one occur. The duties of the office include developing and implementing a comprehensive statewide homeland security strategy; planning and implementing a statewide response system; administering the homeland security advisory system; coordinating, applying for and distributing federal homeland security grant funds; implementing homeland security plans; and such other duties as the governor may prescribe.
  - Oklahoma Highway Safety Office - The Oklahoma Highway Safety Office (OHSO) is responsible for developing an annual statewide plan to decrease fatalities and injuries on Oklahoma roadways. The OHSO administers federal highway safety funds in the form of projects with state and local agencies, nonprofit organizations and private contractors.

=== OLETS ===
The Oklahoma Law Enforcement Telecommunications System (OLETS) is a program of the Department of Public Safety. OLETS is an information sharing network that allows law enforcement agencies across the State access to both State databases as well as information from the various States as well as the Federal Government. The types of data on the system varies from motor vehicle and drivers' license data to state criminal history and correctional records.

OLETS gathers and distributes information from the following agencies:

- Department of Public Safety
- Oklahoma Tax Commission
- Oklahoma State Bureau of Investigation
- National Crime Information Center
- National Law Enforcement Telecommunications System
- National Weather Service Computer System and Network

In order for a local law enforcement agency to gain access to OLETS, it must first sign an agreement with the Department stating the terms and conditions of their access.

=== Staffing ===
The Department of Public Safety, with an annual budget of over several hundred million dollars, is one of the larger employers of the State. For fiscal year 2014, the Department was authorized 1456 full-time employees.

Program	Number of Employees
Administration	73
Homeland Security	17
Highway Safety	24
Law Enforcement	1004
Telecommunications	29
Drivers License	247
Motor Vehicle Operations	28
Size and Weight Permits	34
Total	1,456

=== Budget ===
The Department of Public Safety is the tenth-largest State agency by annual appropriation. The Department receives the revenue for its budget from three major areas: yearly appropriations, grants from the federal government, and fees. For fiscal year 2020, appropriations made up 52.2%, revolving funds made up 36.12%, federal funds made up 11.57%, and 0.08% came from Agency Special Accounts.

Expenditures made by the Department are divided into three major areas: salaries and benefits for employees (54%), operation expenses (37%), and equipment (6%). The remaining 3% is used for various other expenses.

The divisions of the Department operation with the following budgets for Fiscal Year 2020:

Program	Funding (in millions)
Administration	$8.8
Board of Tests	$0.3
Driver Licensing Services	$23.2
Highway Patrol	$105.2
Highway Safety Office	$9.6
Homeland Security	$3.7
ISD Data Processing	$3.6
Motor Vehicle Operations	$10.5
Size and Weight Permits	$2.4
Telecommunications	$6.7

== See also ==
- List of law enforcement agencies in Oklahoma
