= Oklahoma Department of Corrections =

Agency of the state of Oklahoma

Agency overview
- Formed: May 8, 1967
- Preceding agency: Oklahoma Commissioner of Charities and Corrections
- Headquarters: 3400 Martin Luther King Avenue Oklahoma City, Oklahoma
- Employees: 4,341 classified 367 unclassified
- Annual budget: $ 600 million
- Ministers responsible: Tricia Everest, Secretary of Public Safety; T. Hastings Siegfried, Chairman of the Board
- Agency executives: Justin Farris, Director; Jason Sparks, Chief of Operations
- Parent agency: Oklahoma Board of Corrections
- Website: Oklahoma Department of Corrections

The Oklahoma Department of Corrections (DOC or ODOC) is an agency of the state of Oklahoma. DOC is responsible for the administration of the state prison system. It has its headquarters in Oklahoma City, across the street from the headquarters of the Oklahoma Department of Public Safety. The Board of Corrections are appointees: five members are appointed by the Governor; two members are appointed by the President Pro Tempore of the Senate; and two members are appointed by the Speaker of the house of Representatives. The board is responsible for setting the policies of the Department, approving the annual budget request, and working with the Director of Corrections on material matters of the agency. T. Hastings Siegfried is the current chairman of the board. The director, who serves at the pleasure of the governor, is the chief executive of the department. The current director of Corrections is Steven Harpe, who was appointed in October 2022.

== History ==
Prior to 1908, Oklahoma sent prisoners to the Kansas Penitentiary in Lansing, Kansas. After a disputed report on the conditions in the Kansas Penitentiary, Oklahoma opened an institution in the former federal jail in McAlester.

On January 10, 1967, Oklahoma created a new state Corrections Department, consisting of a State Board of Corrections, State Director of Corrections, and three divisions: a Division of Institutions, a Division of Probation and Parole, and a Division of Inspection.

In 1973, a three-day riot resulted in the destruction of most of the Oklahoma State Penitentiary in McAlester and the death of three inmates.

In 1976, the first training academy was established in Oklahoma City.

On 29 August 1983, the Dick Conner Correctional Center was hit by a riot that resulted in an inmate death. On 17 December 1985 another riot occurred, this time at the McAlester prison. Five members of staff were taken hostage and three were seriously injured.

On 4 November 2019, the state released more than four hundred inmates who had been convicted of nonviolent crimes. The commutations were expected to save the state over twelve million dollars.

== Facilities ==
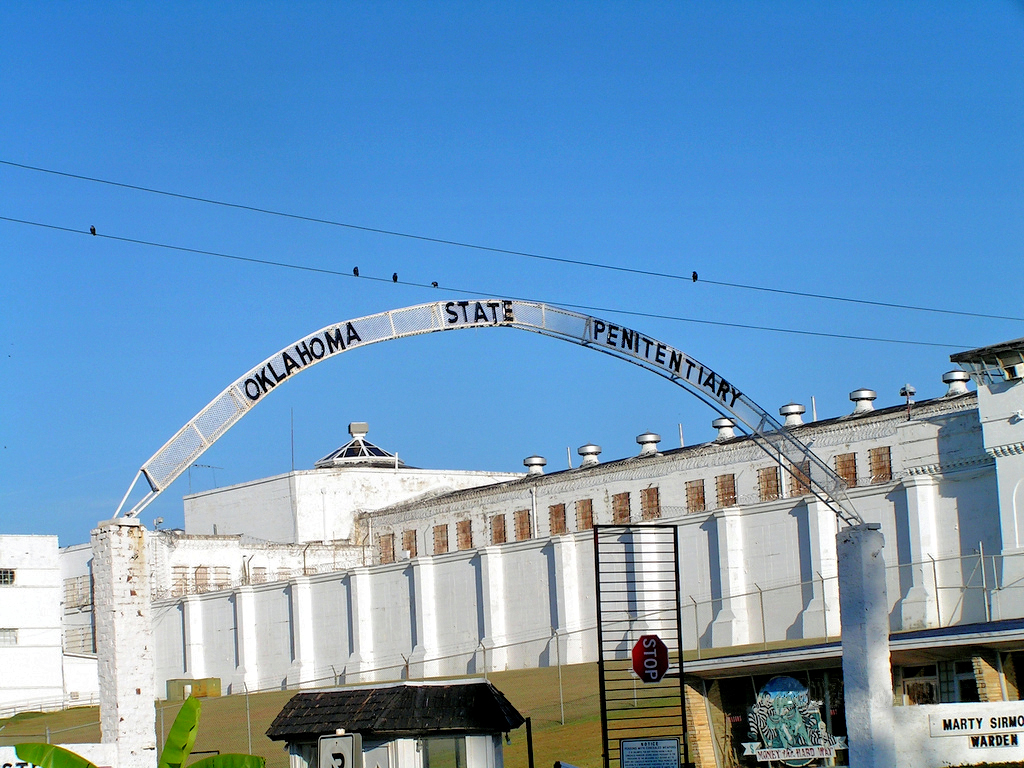
Oklahoma State Penitentiary

As of 2021, the Department of Corrections is responsible for the management, maintenance and security of 23 correctional institutions across the state. Of these facilities, only eight were built originally to serve as prisons.

The execution chamber is located at the Oklahoma State Penitentiary.

=== State prisons ===
- Charles E. Johnson Correctional Center (inmate capacity 600)
- Dick Conner Correctional Center (inmate capacity 1210)
- Dr. Eddie Warrior Correctional Center (inmate capacity 999)
- Great Plains Correctional Center (inmate capacity 2040)
- Howard McLeod Correctional Center (inmate capacity 691)
- Jackie Brannon Correctional Center (inmate capacity 737)
- James Crabtree Correctional Center (inmate capacity 1175)
- Jess Dunn Correctional Center (inmate capacity 1129)
- Jim E. Hamilton Correctional Center (inmate capacity 730)
- John H. Lilley Correctional Center (inmate capacity 836)
- Joseph Harp Correctional Center (inmate capacity 1345)
- Lexington Assessment and Reception Center (inmate capacity 1462)
- Mabel Bassett Correctional Center (inmate capacity 1415)
- Mack Alford Correctional Center (inmate capacity 805)
- North Fork Correctional Facility (inmate capacity 2589)(formerly managed by Corrections Corporation of America)
- Oklahoma State Penitentiary (inmate capacity 838)
- Oklahoma State Reformatory (inmate capacity 1042)
- Red Rock Correctional Center, formerly the Lawton Correctional Facility which was privately operated by GEO Group

=== Community Corrections Centers ===
- Clara Waters Community Corrections Center (inmate capacity 304)
- Enid Community Corrections Center (inmate capacity 98)
- Lawton Community Corrections Center (inmate capacity 153)
- Northeast Oklahoma Correctional Center (inmate capacity 585)
- Oklahoma City Community Corrections Center (inmate capacity 262)
- Union City Community Corrections Center (inmate capacity 224)

=== Halfway Houses ===
- Bridgeway, Inc.

== Organization ==
=== Leadership ===
The Department of Corrections is under the supervision of the Oklahoma Department of Public Safety.. Under current Governor of Oklahoma Kevin Stitt, Tricia Everest is serving as the secretary. The Director of the agency is Steven Harpe.

The Department of Corrections is governed by the Board of Corrections. The board consists of five members appointed by the Governor, two members each appointed by the President Pro Tempore of the Senate and Speaker of the House of Representatives. Each board member is assigned to one or more of the following committees: Executive, Audit/Finance, Public Policy/Affairs/Criminal Justice, or Population/Security/Private Prisons.

| T. Hastings Siegfried | Chairman |
| Matt White | Vice Chair |
| Rhonda Bear | Secretary |
| Joseph Brantley | Member |
| Randy Chandler | Member |
| Stephan Moore | Member |
| Jake Parsons | Member |
| Daniel Snead | Member |
| Roger Thompson | Member |

=== Internal structure ===
The internal structure of the Oklahoma Department of Corrections is as follows:

- Governor of Oklahoma
- Cabinet Secretary of Public Safety
  - Director
    - Chief of Staff
    - Chief of Operations
    - Chief of Public Relations
    - Chief of Programs & Classification
      - Classification & Population
    - Chief Financial Officer
    - Chief Administrator of Health Services
    - General Counsel
    - Inspector General
    - Chief of Offender Advocacy
    - Chief of OCI/Agri Services

=== Divisions ===
The Department of Corrections is governed by the nine-member Board of Corrections, responsible for establishing and reviewing policies, and confirming the appointment of wardens. The director is appointed by the governor of Oklahoma. As the head of the Department of Corrections, the director supervises, directs, and controls the department.

- Administrative Services Division - responsible for all financial, budgeting, personnel, purchasing, information technology and administrative management needs of the Department
- Inspector General Division - responsible for conducting and monitoring all international criminal investigations of inmates and Department employees, including fugitive apprehension
- Health and Offender Services Division - responsible for offender programs, offender medical services, offender mental health, offender education, and Departmental staff training
- Community Corrections and Contract Services Division - responsible for the operation of community corrections centers, statewide probation and parole operations, and monitoring private prisons
- Community Sentencing - responsible for the Community Service Sentencing Program and thirty-six statewide planning councils
- Division of Institutions
  - Facilities - responsible for seventeen prisons across the state which house male and female prisoners

=== Hiring ===
Oklahoma state and United States federal law both place limitations on who can be employed as a correctional officer with the Department. They include any of the following:

- No person who is a registered sex offender
- No person who has been convicted of a crime involving moral turpitude, unless they have received a full pardon for such crime
- No person who has been convicted of any form of felony, unless they have received a full pardon for such felony
- No person who has been convicted of any form of domestic violence, unless they have received a full pardon for such crime
- No person who has been dishonorably discharged from any branch of the Armed Forces of the United States

== Budget ==
The Department of Corrections has annual budget over $500 million. That budget is derived primarily from yearly appropriations, Departmental fees and funds generated by the Prison Industries activities. For Fiscal Year 2014, 88% of the Department's budget comes from yearly appropriations, 6% from the Prison Industries Fund, 4% from the Department's Revolving Fund, and 3% from all other sources.

In late 2017, the department requested more than 1.5 billion dollars, triple its usual budget to make long-delayed improvements.

== Fallen Employees ==
Since the establishment of the Oklahoma Department of Corrections, 22 employees have died in the line of duty.

== See also ==
- Oklahoma State Penitentiary
- List of United States state correction agencies
- List of law enforcement agencies in Oklahoma
