= James Crabtree Correctional Center =

Prison in Oklahoma, United States

- Location in Oklahoma
- Location: Helena, Oklahoma; 36.5461°N 98.2767°W
- Status: Operational
- Security class: Minimum and Medium
- Capacity: 1175
- Population: 1168 (September 9, 2024)
- Opened: May 1982; 44 years ago
- Managed by: Oklahoma Department of Corrections
- Warden: Carrie Bridges
- Website: Oklahoma Department of Corrections - James Crabtree Correctional Center

James Crabtree Correctional Center is an Oklahoma Department of Corrections state prison for men located in Helena, Alfalfa County, Oklahoma, with a capacity of 800 medium-security inmates and 200 minimum-security inmates. The grounds were first established in 1904 before Oklahoma statehood, serving as the Cornell Agriculture College, an orphanage, and the Helena State School for Boys. The property was reassigned to the Department of Corrections on May 24, 1982.

The facility is home to a unique horse-training program under a partnership with the United States Bureau of Land Management. Inmates working the Agri-Services Food Processing Center at JCCC raise significant quantities of onions, squash, radishes and okra. In 2012 the Center also produced 226,000 pounds of corndogs, supplying the entire state prison system.
