= Tricia Everest =

Oklahoma cabinet secretary

Oklahoma Secretary of Public Safety
- Incumbent
- Assumed office 2021
- Preceded by: Chip Keating

Tricia Everest is an American public official and philanthropist who currently serves as Oklahoma's Secretary of Public Safety.

== Early life and education ==
Everest is a self-described fourth-generation Oklahoman. She attended Casady High School and is a graduate of Vanderbilt University. She earned her J.D. degree from the University of Oklahoma College of Law.

== Career ==
Everest began her law career in the state Attorney General's office, serving from 2004 to 2010. She is the founding director of Palomar, which helps abuse victims access necessary services. She has founded and chaired multiple philanthropic efforts across Oklahoma.

Everest was inducted into the Oklahoma Hall of Fame in 2019 for her advocacy and charitable contributions.

In 2020, Governor Kevin Stitt nominated Everest as Oklahoma Secretary of Public Safety. She was confirmed in 2021. Upon her confirmation, she resigned as chair of the Oklahoma County Jail Trust.

As Secretary of Public Safety, Everest has championed workforce initiatives and women's leadership in public safety. She has also focused on creating more educational opportunities for incarcerated people. She chaired the Oklahoma State Work Permits and Visas Task Force, which recommended expanding work permits and visas for noncitizens in Oklahoma. Everest also co-leads the state's Wildfire Response Working Group.

Everest was recognized by the Department of Justice in 2021 for advocating on behalf of victims of crime.
