= Gary Ridley =

Transportation official (1945–2022)

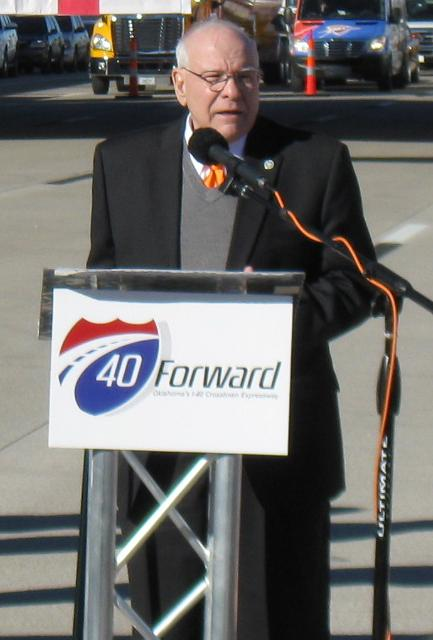
- Ridley speaking at the opening ceremonies for the new Crosstown Expressway in Oklahoma City

Oklahoma Secretary of Transportation
- In office April 10, 2009 – 2017
- Governor: Brad Henry; Mary Fallin
- Preceded by: Phil Tomlinson
- Succeeded by: Mike Patterson

Director of the Oklahoma Department of Transportation
- In office August, 2001 – March 31, 2013
- Governor: Frank Keating; Brad Henry; Mary Fallin
- Preceded by: Herschal Crow
- Succeeded by: Mike Patterson

Director of the Oklahoma Turnpike Authority
- In office November 1, 2009 – March 31, 2013
- Governor: Brad Henry; Mary Fallin
- Preceded by: Phil Tomlinson
- Succeeded by: Tim Stewart

Personal details
- Born: September 29, 1945 Chicago, Illinois, U.S.
- Died: December 21, 2022 (aged 77) Oklahoma City, Oklahoma, U.S.
- Occupation: Engineer

Gary Milo Ridley, PE (September 29, 1945 – December 21, 2022) was an American engineer and civil servant from the state of Oklahoma most notable for concurrently serving as the state's Secretary of Transportation, Director of the Department of Transportation, and the Director of the Oklahoma Turnpike Authority between 2009 and 2013.

He served as Oklahoma Secretary of Transportation between 2009 and 2017, after being appointed by Governor of Oklahoma Brad Henry in 2009 and then retained by Governor Mary Fallin in 2011. In addition, Ridley also served concurrently as both the Director of the Oklahoma Department of Transportation (2001–2013) and the Director of the Oklahoma Turnpike Authority (2009–2013). He served a total of 48 years working for the state of Oklahoma.

== Early life and education ==
Ridley was a native of Chicago, Illinois, and a registered professional engineer.

== Career ==
=== Department of Transportation ===
Ridley joined the Oklahoma Department of Transportation in 1965, when he started as an equipment operator. He was promoted to a maintenance superintendent position in Kingfisher, Oklahoma, in 1970 and an then became a traffic superintendent in Perry, Oklahoma, in 1979. In 1983 he became field maintenance engineer at Perry, then advanced to Division Five Maintenance Engineer at Clinton, Oklahoma in 1986. He became Division Engineer at Clinton in 1995.

Ridley left ODOT in 1997 to become executive director of the Oklahoma Asphalt Paving Association. He returned to the department in January 2001 as Assistant Director for Operations after being appointed by Frank Keating. In August 2009, Ridley was appointed by the Oklahoma Transportation Commission as the Director of the Transportation Department. As Director, Ridley was responsible for managing the Department through the crisis caused by the I-40 bridge disaster, and the reconstruction in the summer of 2002.

Ridley retired from his post as Director of the Transportation Department on March 31, 2013, after serving 12 years in that post and 44 years with the department overall.

=== Turnpike Authority ===
In October, 2009, former Transportation Secretary Phil Tomlinson retired as Director of the Oklahoma Turnpike Authority effective November 1, 2009. The Authority then appointed Secretary Ridley to succeed Tomlinson as Director. With his appointment as Turnpike Director, Ridley is the first person to serve concurrently as Transportation Secretary, Transportation Department Director and Turnpike Authority Director since Neal A. McCaleb in 1999 under Governor Frank Keating. Ridley retired as Director of OTA the same day that he retired from ODOT, March 31, 2013.

=== Secretary of Transportation ===
==== Henry Administration ====
Governor of Oklahoma Brad Henry appointed Ridley as his second Secretary of Transportation following the resignation of Phil Tomlinson in 2009. As Transportation Secretary, Ridley has supervision over all state transportation initiatives and the entities charged with implementing them, including the Oklahoma Department of Transportation, the Oklahoma Transportation Authority, the Oklahoma Aeronautics Commission, the Oklahoma Space Industry Development Authority and all Port Authorities within the state.

During the Henry administration, Ridley served as Transportation Secretary concurrently with his position as Transportation Department Director, which gave him direct control over that department.

==== Fallin Administration ====
On November 29, 2010, Governor-elect Mary Fallin announced that she would retain Ridley as Secretary of Transportation in her Administration. Fallin also retained Ridley as the Director of both the Department of Transportation and the Turnpike Authority.

== Personal life ==
He and his wife, Eula, had two children, Daphne and Joe.

== Death ==
Ridley died on December 21, 2022, in Oklahoma City, at the age of 77.

Political offices
Preceded by Herschal Crow	Director of the Oklahoma Department of Transportation; Under Governors Frank Keating, Brad Henry and Mary Fallin; August, 2001 – March 31, 2013	Succeeded by Mike Patterson
Preceded by Phil Tomlinson	Oklahoma Secretary of Transportation; Under Governors Brad Henry and Mary Fallin; April 10, 2009 – present	Incumbent
Preceded by Phil Tomlinson	Director of the Oklahoma Turnpike Authority; Under Governors Brad Henry and Mary Fallin; November 1, 2009 – March 31, 2013	Succeeded by Tim Stewart
