= Oklahoma Secretary of Transportation =

- Great Seal of Oklahoma

Agency overview
- Formed: June 6, 1986
- Headquarters: 200 NE 21st Street Oklahoma City, Oklahoma
- Employees: 3057 (FY2011)
- Annual budget: $1.23 billion (FY2011)
- Minister responsible: Vacant, Secretary of Transportation
- Child agencies: Oklahoma Department of Transportation; Oklahoma Turnpike Authority; Oklahoma Aeronautics Commission
- Website: Office of the Secretary of Transportation

The Oklahoma secretary of transportation is a member of the Oklahoma Governor's Cabinet. The secretary is appointed by the governor, with the consent of the Oklahoma Senate, to serve at the pleasure of the governor. The secretary serves as the chief advisor to the governor on land, water, air and space traffic transportation needs and infrastructure.

The latest secretary of transportation was Tim Gatz, the Executive Director of the Oklahoma Department of Transportation, who was appointed by Governor Kevin Stitt in 2019. In 2024, following an Attorney General's Opinion, Gatz resigned his position as Secretary of Transportation, leaving the position vacant.

== History ==
The position of Secretary of Transportation was established in 1986 to provide greater oversight and coordination to the agricultural activities of the state government. The position was established, along with the Oklahoma Governor's Cabinet, by the Executive Branch Reform Act of 1986. The act directed the secretary of transportation to advise the governor on transportation needs and infrastructure policy and advise the state transportation agencies on new policy as directed by the governor.

== Dual position ==
Oklahoma state law allows for cabinet secretaries to serve concurrently as the head of a state agency in addition to their duties as a cabinet secretary. Historically, the secretary of transportation has also served as either the director of the Oklahoma Department of Transportation or as the director of the Oklahoma Turnpike Authority. As of 2024, seven of the eight transportation secretaries have served in one of those dual positions, with three serving in all three.

Name	Other position held (if any)
Neal McCaleb	Director, Oklahoma Department of Transportation
Delmas Ford	
Neal McCaleb	Director, Oklahoma Department of Transportation; Director, Oklahoma Turnpike Authority
Herschal Crow	Director, Oklahoma Department of Transportation; Director, Oklahoma Turnpike Authority
Phil Tomlinson	Director, Oklahoma Turnpike Authority
Gary Ridley	Director, Oklahoma Department of Transportation; Director, Oklahoma Turnpike Authority
Mike Patterson	Executive Director, Oklahoma Department of Transportation
Tim Gatz	Executive Director, Oklahoma Department of Transportation Executive Director, Oklahoma Turnpike Authority

However, on February 28, 2024, Attorney General of Oklahoma Gentner Drummond issued an Attorney General's Opinion that held that state officers in Oklahoma could not hold more than one office at a time. In response to this directive, Secretary Gatz resigned his position, and was reappointed by Governor Kevin Stitt as the Executive Director of the Oklahoma Department of Transportation.

== Responsibilities ==
The secretary of transportation is responsible for the construction, maintenance, and regulation of state's transportation system. This infrastructure includes rail lines, state highways, state turnpikes, state seaports, state airports and state spaceports.

As of fiscal year 2011, the secretary of transportation oversees 3478 full-time employees and is responsible for an annual budget of over $1.9 billion.

== Agencies overseen ==
The secretary of transportation oversees the following state agencies:

Seal	Agency	Employees	Budget (in millions)	Function
	Aeronautics Commission	10	$5.7	Promotes aviation throughout the state by supporting the establishment and maintenance of public airports
	Department of Transportation	2488	$1,596	Responsible for the construction, maintenance, and regulation the use of the state's public highway, rail, and waterway transportation infrastructure
	Space Industry Development Authority	3	$0.4	Responsible for the development of a state-owned public spaceport
	Turnpike Authority	681	$223.8	Responsible for the construction, maintenance, and regulation the use of the state's turnpike infrastructure

- All numbers represented Fiscal Year 2011 levels

== Salary ==
The secretary of transportation is one of the few cabinet secretaries whose annual salary is not set by law. As such, it is left to the governor to determine the position's salary through the annual budget. Despite this, if the secretary serves as the head of a state agency, the secretary receives the higher of the two salaries. What makes incumbent Secretary Gary Ridley's example unique is that he serves as both the head of the Transportation Department (ODOT) and the director of the Turnpike Authority (OTA). As such, he receives the salaries allowed to both positions.

== List of secretaries ==
#	Name	Took office	Left office	Governor served under
1	Neal McCaleb	1987	1991	Henry Bellmon
2	Delmas Ford	1991	1995	David Walters
3	Neal McCaleb	1995	2001	Frank Keating
4	Herschal Crow	2001	2003	Frank Keating
5	Phil Tomlinson	2003	2009	Brad Henry
6	Gary Ridley	2009	2011	Brad Henry
6	Gary Ridley	2011	2017	Mary Fallin
7	Mike Patterson	2017	2019	Mary Fallin
8	Tim Gatz	2019	Present	Kevin Stitt
