= Phil Tomlinson =

American politician

Oklahoma Secretary of Transportation
- In office January 21, 2003 – April 10, 2009
- Governor: Brad Henry
- Preceded by: Herschal Crow
- Succeeded by: Gary Ridley

Director of the Oklahoma Turnpike Authority
- In office 2005 – November 1, 2009
- Governor: Brad Henry
- Succeeded by: Gary Ridley

Personal details
- Education: Oklahoma State University
- Occupation: Realtor

Phil Tomlinson was an American politician from the state of Oklahoma who served as the Oklahoma Secretary of Transportation from 2003 to 2009. Tomlinson served as Transportation Secretary under Governor of Oklahoma Brad Henry. In addition to serving as Transportation Secretary, Tomlinson served the Henry Administration as the director of the Oklahoma Turnpike Authority from 2005 to 2009.

== Biography ==
Tomlinson was a commercial real estate investor from Shawnee, Oklahoma. Prior to his service to Governor Henry, Tomlinson served in the administrations of Republican governor Dewey F. Bartlett and Democratic governor David Hall in various posts. He held a bachelor's degree in marketing and a master's degree in business administration, both from Oklahoma State University. Tomlinson died in late March 2016.

== Secretary of Transportation ==
In 2003, Governor of Oklahoma Brad Henry appointed Tomlinson to serve as his first Oklahoma Secretary of Transportation. As Transportation Secretary, Tomlinson oversaw all state transportation initiatives and the entities charged with implementing them, including the Oklahoma Department of Transportation, the Oklahoma Transportation Authority, the Oklahoma Aeronautics Commission, the Oklahoma Space Industry Development Authority and all Port Authorities within the state.

=== Position on NAFTA Superhighway ===
In 2007, Tomlinson told members of the Oklahoma Legislature that Oklahoma has not benefited much from being a member of the North American SuperCorridor Coalition (NASCO). Despite this, Tomlinson did recommend that Oklahoma should continue to participate in the organization, citing future investment as his reason. The state has been a member of NASCO since 1995.

== Resignation from State services ==
Tomlinson resigned as Transportation Secretary in April 2009. Tomlinson, who said he would continue to serve as Director of the Turnpike Authority, resigned due to his desire to reduce his workload. Governor Henry appointed Gary Ridley, Director of the Oklahoma Department of Transportation, to succeed Tomlinson as Secretary.

In October, 2009, Tomlinson resigned as Director of the Transportation Authority effective November 1, 2009. The Authority appointed Gary Ridley to succeed Tomlinson as Director.

Political offices
| Preceded by Herschal Crow | Oklahoma Secretary of Transportation; Under Governor Brad Henry; January 21, 2003 – April 10, 2009 | Succeeded by Gary Ridley |
| Preceded by | Director of the Oklahoma Turnpike Authority; Under Governor Brad Henry; 2005 – November 1, 2009 | Succeeded by Gary Ridley |
