= Tim Gatz =

Executive director of the Oklahoma Department of Transportation
- Incumbent
- Assumed office 2019
- Governor: Kevin Stitt

Oklahoma Secretary of Transportation
- In office 2019 – February 28, 2024
- Governor: Kevin Stitt
- Preceded by: Mike Patterson

Executive director of the Oklahoma Turnpike Authority
- In office 2016 – February 28, 2024
- Governor: Mary Fallin; Kevin Stitt
- Succeeded by: Joe Echelle

Tim Gatz is an American civil servant who served as the Oklahoma Secretary of Transportation, executive director of the Oklahoma Department of Transportation, and executive director of the Oklahoma Turnpike Authority, until an attorney general opinion by Attorney General of Oklahoma Gentner Drummond found holding the offices simultaneously violated a dual office prohibition in the Oklahoma Constitution.

== Biography ==
Tim Gatz started working for the Oklahoma Department of Transportation in 1990. In 2016, Oklahoma Governor Mary Fallin appointed Gatz as the executive director of the Oklahoma Turnpike Authority. In 2019, Governor Kevin Stitt appointed him Oklahoma Secretary of Transportation and he was promoted to the executive director of the Oklahoma Department of Transportation.

Gatz resigned as the executive director of the Oklahoma Turnpike Authority and Oklahoma Secretary of Transportation on February 28, 2024, after an attorney general opinion by Attorney General of Oklahoma Gentner Drummond found holding the offices simultaneously violated a dual office prohibition in the Oklahoma Constitution. The opinion was requested by State Senator Mary Boren. He was reappointed the executive director of the Oklahoma Department of Transportation after his resignation. Governor Kevin Stitt called the attorney general's opinion "political games."
