= Ada Deer =

Native American scholar and politician (1935–2023)

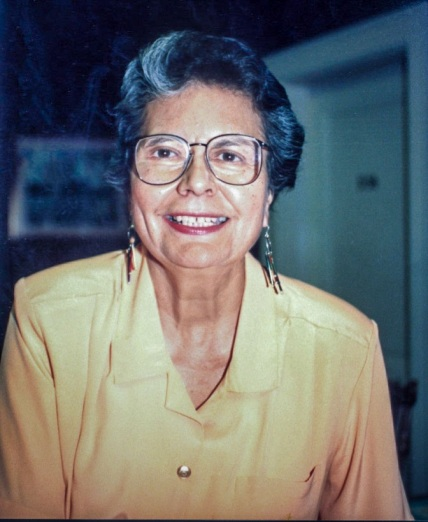

6th Assistant Secretary of the Interior for Indian Affairs
- In office 1993–1997
- President: Bill Clinton
- Preceded by: Eddie Frank Brown
- Succeeded by: Kevin Gover

Personal details
- Born: August 7, 1935 Keshena, Wisconsin, U.S.
- Died: August 15, 2023 (aged 88) Fitchburg, Wisconsin, U.S.
- Party: Democratic
- Education: University of Wisconsin, Madison (BA); New York School of Philanthropy (MSW)

Ada Elizabeth Deer (August 7, 1935 – August 15, 2023) was an American scholar and civil servant who was a member of the Menominee Indian Tribe of Wisconsin and a Native American advocate. As an activist, she opposed the federal termination of tribes from the 1950s. During the Clinton administration, Deer served as assistant secretary of the interior for Indian affairs. For her advocacy and organization on behalf of Native people, she was recognized as a social work pioneer by the National Association of Social Workers in 2010.

== Early life and education ==
Deer was born in Keshena, Wisconsin, on August 7, 1935, and grew up on an Indian reservation. She was an active member of the Menominee tribe, which is located in the northeast part of Wisconsin. Her mother was an advocate for Native American rights, and she followed in her mother's footsteps. As the oldest of five children, Deer helped take care of her siblings. Her mother began taking her to Menominee council meetings when she was four. These meetings were influential for her later career. She felt that she was more exposed to the world around her because of it, and it was her first exposure to politics.

As a high schooler, Deer visited the University of Wisconsin-Madison as part of the government and leadership program Badger Girls State. She met people all across the state, and visited the capitol.

She later returned to the campus as a student and earned a bachelor's degree in 1957, becoming the first Menominee to do so. She earned a Master of Social Work from the New York School of Social Work (later Columbia University School of Social Work) in 1961.

Deer subsequently served in Puerto Rico with the Peace Corps for two years. She later became a Menominee social worker.

== Native American advocacy ==
Following the completion of her graduate work, Deer returned to the Midwest to be closer to the Menominee Nation, settling in Minneapolis. She found few local services in place for Native Americans living in urban settings. She worked to advocate on their behalf with federal authorities. Under the Menominee Termination Act of 1954, Congress ended the special relationship between the Menominee tribe of Wisconsin and the federal government, and the tribe had been governed by a corporate body called Menominee Enterprises, Inc (MEI). MEI was controlled by a voting trust, and Menominee tribal members had no shares in the corporation. Four of the voting trust members were Menominee; however, five votes were required in order for the trust to take action. In the 1960s and 1970s, there was renewed Congressional involvement in rebuilding tribal infrastructure, both socially and economically.

Deer and Jim White became leaders of an organization, Determination of Rights and Unity for Menominee Stockholders (DRUMS), formed in 1970 in opposition to a proposed land development of Legend Lake, a non-Indian owned artificial lake and housing property plan on Menominee land. The selling of land as an economic stimulus to non-Indians was a direct result of poor economic conditions that the Menominee had been living in since termination. DRUMS members gained two seats on the MEI Board, and by the end of the following year had obtained a majority of MEI board seats.

After successfully stopping the land development in 1972, DRUMS began the fight to reverse termination and regain status as a federally recognized and sovereign Indian tribe. Originally in opposition to MEI, members of DRUMS eventually gained positions in MEI offices, where they began lobbying Congress for Menominee restoration. As part of these efforts, Deer directly engaged with senators and representatives in Congress, and crafted legal briefs advocating for Menominee sovereignty.

Her efforts, along with many other Menominees, played a part in bringing the Termination Era to a close. Deer lobbied on behalf of the Menominee people, and cultivated a grassroots campaign to help them. On December 22, 1973, President Richard Nixon signed the Menominee Restoration Act. This restored official federal recognition to the Menominee tribe.

Because of her active participation in changing the legislation, Deer was the first woman to chair the Menominee tribe in Wisconsin. She served as chair of the Menominee Restoration Committee from 1974 to 1976. Before and after her term in the Bureau of Indian Affairs (BIA), she served on the National Support Committee (NSC) of the Native American Rights Fund (NARF). She served as chair of the NSC and chair of the NARF board of directors.

== Federal government ==
In 1992, Deer ran for Congress. She almost became the first Native American woman elected, but narrowly lost to Republican Scott L. Klug.

In 1993, Deer was appointed assistant secretary for Indian affairs at the Department of the Interior by President Bill Clinton, and served from 1993 to 1997. She was the first woman to hold this position. Secretary of the Interior Bruce Babbitt praised her "lifelong commitment to American Indian rights, to improving the lives of American Indians, and to the strengthening of tribal governments".

During this period, she was a delegate to the United Nations Human Rights Committee. From January to May 1997, she served as chair of the National Indian Gaming Commission.

== Political activity ==
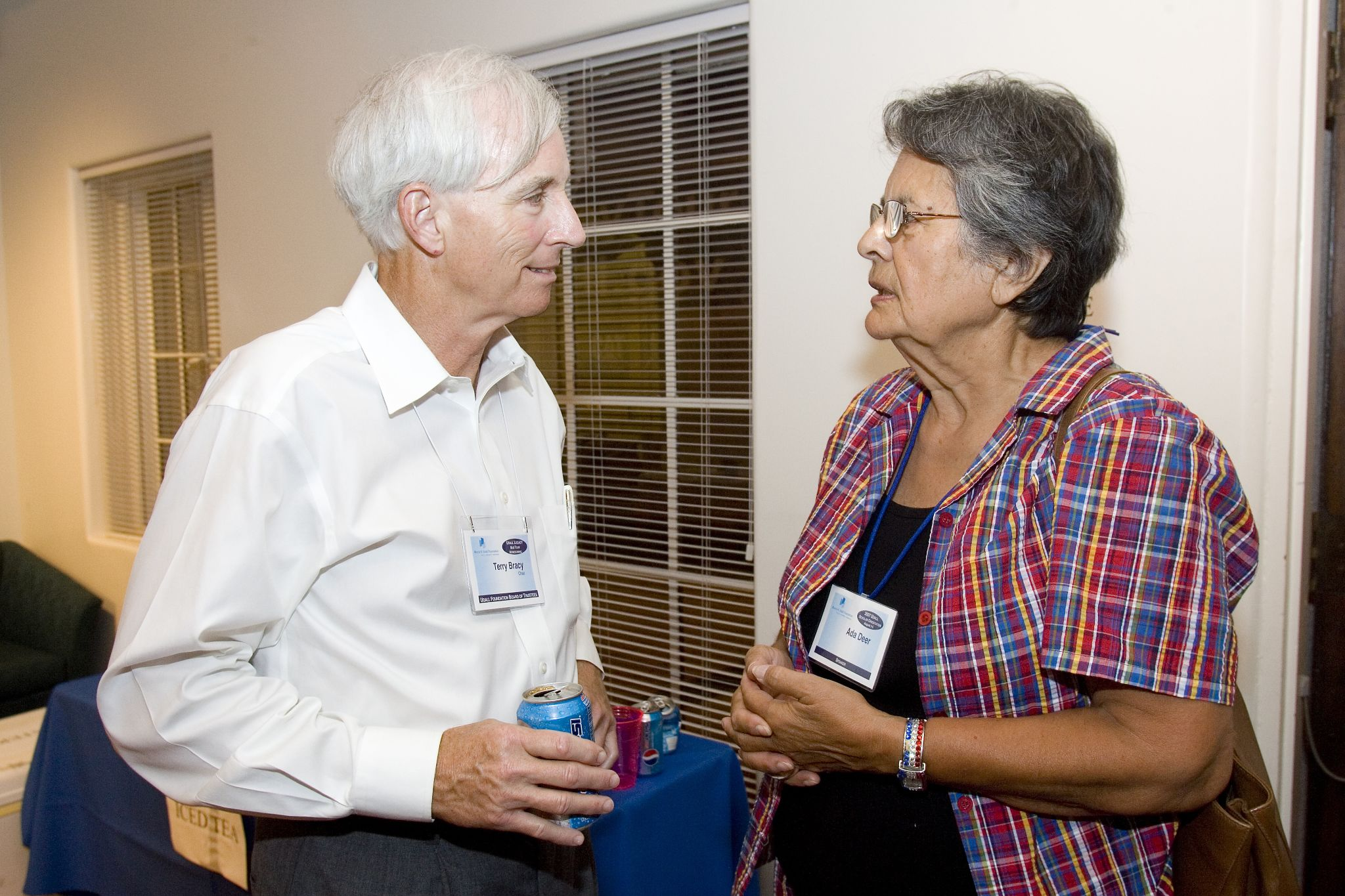
Terrence L. Bracy and Deer speaking in 2007

Deer was involved in electoral politics beginning in the 1970s. In 1978 and 1982, she ran for secretary of state of Wisconsin, losing both elections. In 1984, she served as vice chair of Walter Mondale's 1984 presidential campaign.

In 1992, she ran for a seat in the U.S. House of Representatives, mounting a campaign in Wisconsin's 2nd congressional district. She won the Democratic primary without "soft money" funding from political action committees. Following her primary win, a local newspaper ran a photo of Deer proudly holding a sign reading "Me Nominee" in a reference to her tribal membership. Deer was the first Native American woman in Wisconsin to run for U.S. Congress. However, she lost the general election to incumbent Scott Klug, a Republican.

In 1993, Deer was appointed assistant secretary of the U.S. Department of Interior of the Bureau of Indian Affairs. While in office, she helped create a federal policy for more than 550 federally recognized tribes. When Republicans won a majority in the 1994 United States House of Representatives elections, she was successful in preserving federal funding for the Bureau of Indian Affairs, as part of their promised Contract with America proposing to decrease the size of the federal government.

In 2020, Deer was a Joe Biden delegate at the 2020 Democratic National Convention. She endorsed State Treasurer Sarah Godlewski's campaign for Senate in the 2022 election.

== Educational career ==
Deer taught in the School of Social Work at the University of Wisconsin–Madison from 1977 until 1993, holding the title of Distinguished Lecturer. Beginning in 1977, she was also a lecturer in the American Indian Studies program, and from 2000 to 2007 was the program's director. During her tenure, she co-founded Milwaukee's Indian Community School. She also created the first program at the university to provide social work training on Native American reservations. She was also a fellow at the Harvard Institute of Politics at the John F. Kennedy School of Government.

== Death ==
Deer died of natural causes at a hospice in Fitchburg, Wisconsin on August 15, 2023, at age 88. She was surrounded by loved ones, and was remembered as a calming presence.

== Honors and achievements ==
- 1957: First member of the Menominee Tribe to graduate from the University of Wisconsin–Madison
- 1961: First member of the Menominee Tribe to receive a master's degree
- 1974: First woman to serve as chair of the Menominee Tribe
- 1975: Pollitzer Award, Ethical Cultural Society, New York
- 1993: First woman to head the Bureau of Indian Affairs
- 1998: Inducted into the Alumni Hall of Fame at Columbia University School of Social Work, in recognition of her contributions to Native American advocacy and scholarship
- 2000: National Women's History Month honoree
- 2003: Included as one of 51 "accomplished practitioners and educators" in the book Celebrating Social Work: Faces and Voices of the Formative Years (Council on Social Work Education)
- 2007: Wisconsin Historical Society Robert and Belle Case La Follette Award for Distinction in Public Service
- 2010: Recognized as a Social Work Pioneer by the National Association of Social Workers
- 2019: National Native American Hall of Fame
- 2023: In Wisconsin, August 7 was proclaimed Ada Deer Day in honor of her 88th birthday.

== Works ==
- Making a Difference: My Fight for Native Rights and Social Justice. (New Directions in Native American Studies Series, vol. 19). University of Oklahoma Press, 2019. ISBN 9780806164274.

== See also ==
- Native American women in politics
