= Edison Chiloquin =

Edison Chiloquin (1923-2003) was an American Indian man popularly known for his refusal of accepting payments for his tribe's land after the government’s termination of the tribe.

== Background ==
Edison Chiloquin was born in Chiloquin, Oregon on August 31, 1923 to Kilda and Margaret Chiloquin. The town of Chiloquin was named after his great-grandfather and Edison has been known as the town’s first citizen. He is a descendent of the Pla’ikni people of Southern Oregon who were one of the six tribes grouped into the Klamath Tribes. Chiloquin first married a woman named Leatha in 1969 who died in 1979, and then in 1984 remarried and had a daughter with a woman named Carla; the marriage ended in a divorce.

Chiloquin was widely known for his refusal of accepting payments from the government for his tribal lands and gained popularity for doing so in 1974. To Edison, any amount of money was not enough to purchase his tribal land, he believed it to be invaluable. He was also widely known in his community, and his efforts were believed by some tribal members to have contributed to the restoration of the tribe following the Klamath Termination Act. He also assisted a lot in preserving his culture, which he had done in the passing of culture and knowledge from his ancestors to young children through a summer culture camp. He also preserved traditions through the book, Return of the Raven, that he wrote with his first wife Leatha.

== World War II ==
Chiloquin served in World War II and was honored with a Bronze Star, two Purple Hearts, and other medals for his heroism as a cavalry scout. During his time in the army, he served in The Philippines and was also awarded a Silver Star for his bravery.

== Toward the Chiloquin Act ==
Following the termination of the Klamath Tribe and other legislation that stripped the tribes of their traditional homelands and put it into the hands of the US government, Chiloquin stood in opposition for years in order to gain title to some of his ancestors’ land. His people’s original homelands were claimed by the US Forest Services and in response Chiloquin stood his ground on those homelands and refused to accept government payments that rose to over $250,000 for the land. Instead of accepting those payments, he lit a sacred fire at the area where his grandfather’s village once was that remained lit continuously for five and a half years as he negotiated for the return of land.

Edison was one of 473 tribal members who elected to retain interest in their land and refused to sell it, while the other 1600 tribal members agreed to sell their property. Sold property ended up in the hands of a private corporation who acquired 91,000 acres of land, in the hands of the department of interior who acquired 15,000 acres of land, or with the Department of Agriculture who gained 520,000 acres of Klamath tribal lands.

Finally, in 1980, Edison achieved his goal of gaining title to the traditional lands of the Pla’ikni Village with the signing of the Chiloquin Act. President Jimmy Carter signed the Chiloquin Act which gave Edison Chiloquin and his descendants title to those 560 acres of land.

== Celebration of life ==
Edison died on May 17, 2003, at the age of 79 in his family home. He was buried at the Friendship Cemetery in Chiloquin, Oregon, and the land he gained title to was left to his family.

Hundreds of people from the area gathered and filled the Big Gym in Chiloquin, Oregon, to celebrate his life through open casket ceremonies, cultural drumming, singing, dancing, and Veteran of Foreign Wars honor guard and gun salute. People spoke of the impact that Edison had on their community and filled his casket with an American flag that was presented to his family, family photos, Tabasco sauce, a blanket, a raven painting, and his cowboy hat.
