= Town & Country Center =

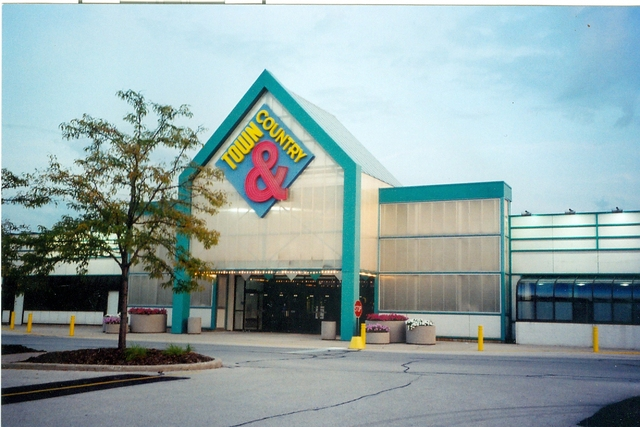
- The exterior of the movie theater with the mall logo posted before redevelopment.
- Location: Arlington Heights, Illinois, United States
- Coordinates: 42°06′28.5″N 87°58′39.9″W
- Address: 445 E Palatine Rd
- Opened: 1981 (as an enclosed center) 2007 (as a strip mall)
- Renovated: 2005-2007 (transformation from an enclosed mall into a strip mall)
- Closed: 2004 (as an enclosed center)
- Previous names: Town 'N' Country Mall
- Manager: Visconsi Companies, Ltd.
- Owner: Visconsi Companies, Ltd.
- Num. of stores: Around 20 stores (as an enclosed center) Around 15 stores (as a strip mall)
- Num. of anchor tenants: Two anchors originally; when the mall was enclosed, the big-box stores that took the mall's place were not designated as anchor stores.
- Floor area: 326,000 square feet (30,286 square meters)
- Floors: 1 (original mall had two floors)
- Parking: 1,953

Town & Country Mall (widely known as Town & Country Center) was a small, local, enclosed shopping center located in Arlington Heights, IL, right off of Rand Road, that was later converted into what is now the Town & Country Center strip mall. It originally opened in 1981 with around 20 stores and two anchor stores, that being K-Mart and Service Merchandise. The original mall closed in 2004 and was transformed into a strip mall by 2007.

== History ==
The mall was constructed in the late 70s/early '80s and opened in 1981. The interior of the mall was overwhelmed with pastel colors, ceramic tile and brick flooring, and planters throughout. The mall was lit up with natural lighting from skylights. The mall was just a single way with little corridors throughout connecting anchor stores and mall entrances. A small K-Mart opened at the east end of the mall, while a Service Merchandise store opened at the west end of the mall in 1981. Both anchor stores were complimented with a six-screen Essaness Theater complex towards the rear side of the mall, which would later be operated by Cineplex Odeon when they bought out Essaness. None of the anchors were built on a large scale due to low ceilings. In 1984, a Dominick's grocery store and Walgreens drug store were built at the west end of the mall structure with no mall entrances. There was never enough space in the mall for a lot of stores, but it managed to hold a steady occupancy rate for about 15 years. There was a decent number of popular chains inside the mall, including RadioShack, Waldenbooks, Just Pants, and Casual Corner. The mall did feature an arcade next to the movie theater entrance. Other big retailers included Thom McAn, SuperCuts, Pearle Vision, Swensen's Ice Cream, Garibaldi's Pizza, and Gamer's Paradise. There was also a post office near the rear entrance next to K-Mart. Later on, in the decade and into the 1990s, tenants were being replaced with new ones. One of those replacement tenants is the Old Country Buffet, which replaced Casual Corner. A Lord & Taylor Clearance Center was built where the rear mall entrance next to Service Merchandise was. K-Mart closed in 1991, and the space was subdivided into Marshall's (which kept the mall entrance) and Best Buy. In 1996, the Lord & Taylor Clearance Center was expanded to take up a considerable portion of the western side of the mall, eliminating mall access to Service Merchandise. At the start of the millennium, the Lord & Taylor Clearance Center closed permanently due to the parent company's decision to discontinue the store concept. The space remained vacant after that. The Waldenbooks store closed and was replaced by a used book retailer for an extended period of time. RadioShack also closed permanently. Following all of the store vacancies in the mall, the movie theater decided to close its doors indefinitely, which essentially made all of the remaining tenants eventually close their spaces. By 2004, the Old Country Buffet was the only operating tenant in the mall. The mall interior entrances have been sealed, including the Marshall's mall entrance. Later that year, the mall was confirmed to be permanently shuttered.

== Redevelopment ==
In 2001, Visconsi Companies announced a proposal to convert the enclosed mall into a strip mall. The plans were that they would gut the interior of the mall, reface the exterior, add new tenants, and keep Service Merchandise and Best Buy. Service Merchandise closed its doors due to bankruptcy in 2002, so the space was largely vacant. The plans were extended in 2002 because of some problems, but they finally got the plans through in 2005. In 2005, redevelopment started on the former mall with the same plans. The redevelopment was completed in 2007, adding a whole new variety of retail and restaurant tenants. New tenants included JoAnn Fabrics (which replaced portions of the original mall interior) and Ashley Furniture. In 2013, the iconic Dominick's grocery store closed its doors permanently due to the company's long battle with bankruptcy. Shortly after Dominick's closed; IGA bought the space to turn it into Joe Caputo & Sons Fruit Market. In October 2015, Joe Caputo & Sons unexpectedly closed down for unknown reasons and Ashley Furniture closed down, too. In September 2018, the long-standing Marshall's store closed and was relocated across the street to Northpoint Shopping Center. The space for a couple of years was occupied by Dick's Sporting Goods as a warehouse store. In 2023, the space was purchased by Burlington and was renovated. It opened in 2024. In 2022, Amazon Fresh announced they would open a store inside of the former Dominick's/Joe Caputo & Sons space. Amazon posted job openings for the store shortly after announcement. There have been delays with the renovation of the space due to costs and permits, but they eventually opened in 2024. In 2025, JoAnn Fabrics announced that they filed bankruptcy and closed their all stores. They closed on May 2025. January 2026, Amazon Fresh announced that they would close down all their grocery stores by February 1, 2026. As of 2026, the mall continues to thrive with its new life as a strip mall.
