= Taxation in Oklahoma =

Oklahoma Taxes

Taxation in Oklahoma takes many forms. Individuals and corporations in Oklahoma are required to pay taxes or fee charges to both levels of government: state and local. Taxes are collected by the government to support the provisions of public services. The Oklahoma Constitution vested the authority to levy taxes with the Oklahoma Legislature while the Oklahoma Tax Commission is the primary Executive agency responsible for collecting taxes.

The most significant forms of taxation are income tax, sales tax and excise taxes.

== State Taxation ==
=== Income Taxes ===
Taxes based on income are imposed at the State level, both on individuals and corporations. Oklahoma first enacted an individual income tax in 1915 and then a corporate income tax in 1931. Income taxes are steadily increased as a major State revenue source since 1933 when the Oklahoma Constitution was amended to prohibit State-level taxation of property.

Income taxes are now the largest source of revenue for the State government, accounting for approximately 38% of total state revenue - 32% from individuals and 6% from corporations.

==== Tax Rate ====
===== Individuals =====
Oklahoma has adopted a progressive income tax for individuals, in which the tax rate increases as the amount of personal income increase. As of tax year 2026, the standard deduction for singles is $6,350 and for married is $12,700. In 2025, a bill was passed so that as state revenue increases, predefined triggers will lower the income tax rates until the personal income tax has been eliminated.

2026 Individual Income Tax Rates
Marginal Tax Rate	Single / Married Filling Separately	Married Filing Jointly / Qualifying Widow(er)s / Heads of Households
2.5%	$3,750.01 - $4,900	$7,500.01 - $9,800
3.5%	$4,900.01 - $7,200	$9,800.01 - $14,400
4.5%	$7,200.01 +	$14,400.01 +

===== Corporations =====
The corporate income tax rate is a flat tax of 4% for all corporations, regardless of earnings. When established in 1931, the corporate income tax was progressive but became flat in 1935.

==== Revenue Purpose ====
Both individual and corporate income taxes are earmarked by the Oklahoma Legislature to support specific state agencies and/or funds:

Individual and Corporate Income Taxes
Purpose	Individual-Percentage Received	Corporate-Percentage Received
General Revenue	85.66%	77.5%
Education Reform Fund	8.34%	16.5%
Teachers' Retirement Fund	5%	5%
Ad Valorem Reimbursement Fund	1%	1%

=== Sales and Use Tax ===
The State sales tax and use tax was first enacted in 1933 as a temporary one percent tax for the support of public schools. Two years later, the tax was renewed with revenues being deposited into the state General Fund. In 1939, the sales tax rate was increased to two percent with the revenues being used to fund public assistance programs. This remained unchanged until the 1980s when the revenues were redirected back to the General Fund. Additionally, throughout the 1980s, the tax rate was gradually increased from two percent to four percent. In 1990, the passage of the "Education Reform Act" increased the State sales tax rate to its present four and a half percent.

State sales taxes are now the second largest source of revenue for the State government, accounting for approximately 27% of total state revenue.

==== Tax Rate ====
The "Oklahoma Sales Tax Code" imposes a 4.5% Statewide tax on the sale of all goods but groceries within the State. The State also levies a 4.5% Statewide tax on the use, storage, and consumption of goods bought out of State.

==== Revenue Purpose ====
Both the State sales and use taxes are earmarked by the Oklahoma Legislature to support specific state agencies and/or funds:

State Sales and Use Taxes
Purpose	Percentage Received
General Revenue	83.61%
Education Reform Fund	10.46%
Teachers' Retirement Fund	5%
Tourism Fund	0.87%
Historical Society Fund	0.06%

=== Gross Production Tax ===
The State levies a gross production tax on the removal of natural products from Oklahoma's land or water. The gross production tax was established in 1910 to tax the extraction of natural gas and oil. With the elimination of State-level property taxation, the gross production tax began an important source of State revenue. The current State gross production tax takes the form of an excise tax, with the amount of the tax based upon the sale price of oil and natural gas.

Gross Production taxes are the fourth largest source of revenue for the State government, accounting for approximately 6% of total state revenue.

==== Tax Rates ====
Oklahoma state law has imposed several taxes on the removal of natural resources of the State:

Gross Production and Excise Taxes on Natural Resources
Resource	Tax Imposed
Asphalt, Lead, Uranium, Zinc, Gold, Silver, and Copper	0.75%
Oil	7%
Natural Gas	7%
Petroleum Oil Excise	0.95%
Natural Gas Excise	0.95%

==== Revenue Purpose ====
The Oklahoma Legislature has earmarked the revenues from the gross production and petroleum excise tax to support various agencies and/or funds:

Gross Production and Excise Taxes on Natural Resources
Purpose	Ores and Precious Metals	Oil	Natural Gas	Petroleum Gas Excise	Natural Gas Excise
General Revenue	85.72%		85.72	82.634%	82.634%
County Highway Funds	7.14%	7.14%	7.14%		
Local School Districts	7.14%	7.14%	7.14%		
Common Education Technology Fund		25.72%			
Higher Education Capital Fund		25.72%			
Oklahoma Tuition Scholarship Fund		25.72%			
County Bridge and Road Improvement Fund		3.745%			
Tourism Capital Fund		1.427%			
Conservation Commission Infrastructure Fund		1.427%			
Community Water Infrastructure Development Fund		1.427%			
Statewide Circuit Engineering District Fund		0.535%			
Corporation Commission Plugging Fund				10.526%	10.526
Interstate Oil Compact Fund				6.84%	6.84%

=== Motor Vehicle Taxes ===
The modern excise tax on motor vehicles was established in 2000. The motor vehicle tax assesses a three and one quarter percent tax on the sale price of all vehicles in the State, new and used. Taxes are collected by local motor license agents (or tag agents) under the supervision of the Tax Commission.

State motor vehicle excise taxes are the third largest source of revenue for the State government, accounting for approximately 7% of total state revenue.

==== Tax Rates ====
Oklahoma state law has imposed several taxes on motor vehicles of the State:

Vehicle Taxes and Licenses
Source	Tax Imposed
Aircraft Excise Tax	3.25%
New Motor Vehicle Tax	3.25% Excise Tax + 1.25% Sales Tax
Used Motor Vehicle Excise Tax	$20 on first $1,500 + 3.25% on remainder + 1.25% Sales Tax on Total
Motor Vehicle Registration Fee	Vehicle Age Years 1-4: $91/annually Vehicle Age Years 5-8: $81/annually Vehicle Age Years 9-12: $61/annually Vehicle Age Years 13-16: $41/annually Vehicle Age Years 17+: $21/annually
Motor Vehicle Rental Tax	6%
Overweight Vehicle Fee	$40 per permit + $10 per thousand pounds above the limit
New and Used Motor Boat Excise Tax	3.25%
Motor Boat Registration Fee	Boat Age Years 1: $2.25 + $1.00 for every $100.00 of sale price Boat Age Years 2-10: $2.25 + 90% of previous year's fee Boat Age Years 11+: $2.25 + 90% of tenth year's fee

==== Revenue Purpose ====
The Oklahoma Legislature has provided that the excise tax on motor vehicles and boats and the registration fees for motor vehicles and boats are to be apportioned as follows:

Vehicle Taxes and Fees
Purpose	Motor Vehicle and Boat Taxes and Fees
Local School Districts	36.2%
General Revenue	29.84%
State Transportation Fund	0.31%
Local County Governments	8.07%
County Highway Funds	6.21%
Local City Governments	3.1%
Law Enforcement Retirement Fund	1.24%
Wildlife Conservation Fund	0.03%
County Improvements for Roads and Bridges Fund	15%

All revenues generated from the Aircraft Excise Tax are directed towards the Aeronautics Commission Fund, which supports the operations of the Oklahoma Aeronautics Commission.

The Oversized Vehicle Fees are apportioned in the same manner as the motor vehicle taxes and fees on the first $1,216,000 collected each month. Any revenues collected in excess of that amount are deposited into the Weigh Station Improvement Fund, which is used to maintain and expand the State's Weigh stations.

=== Motor Fuel Taxes ===
In 1923, Oklahoma enacted its first State-level excise tax on motor fuels. The motor vehicle tax has since its enactment been the primary funding mechanize used for the construction and maintenance of State roads and bridges. Prior to the enactment of the fuel tax, the State played a limited role in building the State's transportation infrastructure, primarily overseeing the work conducted by local governments. The current motor fuel taxes are a set amount based upon the amount of fuel purchased and not a percentage of the sale price. The fuel taxes continue to be the State's primary source of funding for infrastructure spending, with a significant portion of the revenues being forwarded to local level government.

State motor fuel taxes account for approximately 5% of total state revenue.

==== Tax Rates ====
Oklahoma state law levies taxes on both gasoline and diesel motor fuels:

Motor Fuel Taxes
Source	Tax Imposed
Gasoline Tax	$0.19/gallon
Diesel Tax	$0.19/gallon
Motor Fuel Special Assessment Fee	$0.01/gallon on both gasoline and diesel fuels
Compressed Natural Gas Tax	$0.05/gasoline gallon equivalent
Liquefied Natural Gas Tax	$0.05/diesel gallon equivalent
Aircraft Fuel Tax	$0.0008/gallon

==== Revenue Purpose ====
Oklahoma state law levies taxes on both gasoline and diesel motor fuels:

Motor Fuel Taxes Taxes
Purpose	Gasoline Tax	Diesel Tax	Motor Fuel Fee	Aircraft Fuel Tax
State Transportation Fund	First $250,000 collected monthly	First $83,333.33 collected monthly		
High Priority State Bridge Fund	1.625%	1.39%		
State Transportation Fund	63.75%	64.34%		
Local County Governments	30.125%	26.58%		
Local County Highway Funds		3.85%		
County Bridge and Road Improvement Fund	2.297%	3.36%		
Local City Governments	1.875%			
Statewide Circuit Engineering District Fund	0.328%	0.48%		
Corporation Commission Fund			First $1,000,000 collected monthly	
Department of Environmental Quality Fund			8%	
Petroleum Storage Tank Indemnity Fund			92%	
Aeronautics Commission Fund				100%

=== Tobacco Taxes ===
The State levies taxes on cigarettes and other tobacco products. The State levies an excise tax on cigarettes, as well as various excise taxes on cigars and smoking and chewing tobacco. As Oklahoma is home to numerous Native American tribes, the State has entered into state-tribal tobacco compacts under which the tribes remit taxes to the State derived from the sale of tobacco products on Indian land.

State taxes on tobacco products account for approximately 4% of total state revenue.

==== Tax Rates ====
Oklahoma state law levies taxes on cigarettes as well as various other tobacco products:

Tobacco Taxes
Source	Tax Imposed
Cigarette Tax	$1.03/pack of 20
Cigarette License Tax	$30 for 3 year permit for retailers $250 for 1 year permit for wholesalers $100 for 1 year permit for distributors
Tobacco Products Tax	Little Cigars - $0.72/pack of 20 Large Cigar Tax - $0.12/each Smoking Tobacco - 80% of factory list price Chewing Tobacco - 60% of factory list price
Tobacco License Tax	$30 for 3 year permit for retailers $250 for 1 year permit for wholesalers $100 for 1 year permit for distributors

==== Revenue Purposes ====
Cigarette Taxes
Purpose	Percentage Received
Health Employee and Economy Improvement Fund	22.06%
Comprehensive Cancer Center Debt Service Fund	3.09%
Trauma Care Assistance Revolving Fund	7.5%
OSU College of Osteopathic Medicine Fund	3.09%
Health Care Authority Medicaid Program Fund	26.38%
Mental Health and Substance Abuse Services Fund	2.65%
Breast and Cervical Cancer Treatment Fund	0.44%
Teachers' Retirement System Revolving Fund	1%
Education Reform Fund	2.07%
Tobacco Prevention and Cessation Fund	0.66%
General Fund	16.83%
County and City Governments	14.23%

=== Insurance Tax ===
Oklahoma assesses a State level excise tax on insurance premiums paid across the State. The insurance tax is collected by the Oklahoma Insurance Department. While most of the insurance tax is deposited within the General Fund, the revenues also support the Insurance Department and provide revenues for the State's employee retirement systems.

Insurance premium taxes account for approximately 2% of total state revenue.

==== Tax Rate ====
Insurance Tax
Source	Tax Imposed
Insurance Premiums	2.25%

==== Revenue Purpose ====
Revenues from insurance premium taxes are earmarked by the Oklahoma Legislature to support specific state agencies and/or funds. More than half of the revenues collected are used to support the State's public employee retirement funds, with the remainder allocated to the General Fund.

Insurance Tax
Purpose	Percentage Received
Firefighter Pension and Retirement Fund	First $812,500 collected and 36% of remainder
Police Pension and Retirement Fund	First $325,000 collected and 14% of remainder
Law Enforcement Retirement Fund	First $112,500 collected and 5% of remainder
General Fund	Remaining 45%

=== Alcohol Taxes ===
Oklahoma has enacted a number of taxes on alcoholic beverages. The alcoholic beverage tax on liquor is an excise tax varying in amount depending on the alcohol by volume of the drink and an excise tax of $11.25 on each barrel of low-alcohol beer sold. A special sales tax of 13.5% is levied on the sale of all mixed drinks.

State taxes on alcoholic beverage products account for approximately 1% of total state revenue.

== See also ==
- Oklahoma Tax Commission
- Oklahoma state budget
- Taxation in the United States
