= Tahoe Joe's =

U.S. chain of steakhouse restaurants

- Company type: Subsidiary
- Industry: Restaurant
- Founded: 1995; 31 years ago
- Founder: Dave Fansler
- Headquarters: Central Valley, California, U.S.
- Parent: MTY Food Group
- Website: tahoejoes.com

Tahoe Joe's is a chain of three steakhouse restaurants based in the Central Valley of California. The first restaurant opened in Fresno in 1995 by Dave Fansler with restaurants in Roseville and Folsom opening in 2002 (both since closed).

In May 2008, Tahoe Joe's parent company, Buffets, Inc. (now VitaNova Brands) was undergoing bankruptcy and tried to sell the Tahoe Joe's chain. The original Tahoe Joe's restaurant in Fresno closed in September 2016.

In 2021, it was announced that it was acquired by BBQ Holdings, which, at the time, was the parent company of the barbecue restaurant chain Famous Dave's. A year later, MTY Food Group gained control of the brand after the company merged with BBQ Holdings.

== Critical acclaim ==
Tahoe Joe's has received an 8 ranking from 10best. Additionally, Tahoe Joe's has been noted at The Consumerist for making amends for a wedding banquet gone wrong.
