= VitaNova Brands =

American restaurant national

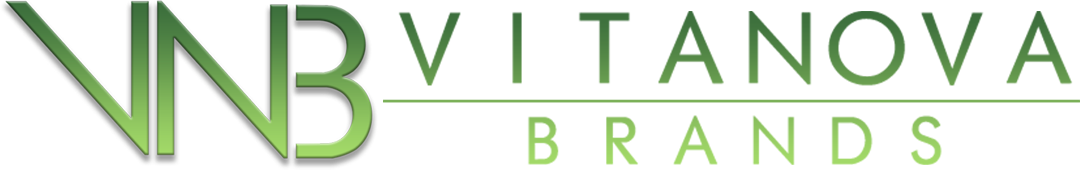
- Formerly: Buffets, Inc. (1983–2013); Ovation Brands (2013–2020)
- Company type: Subsidiary
- Industry: Restaurants
- Founded: October 19, 1983; 42 years ago
- Founder: Roe Hatlen; C. Dennis Scott; Dermot Rowland; Doron Jensen
- Defunct: January 4, 2022; 4 years ago
- Fate: Chapter 11 bankruptcy and liquidation; assets acquired by BBQ Holdings (later MTY Food Group)
- Successor: MTY Food Group
- Headquarters: San Antonio, Texas, United States
- Area served: United States
- Key people: Jason Kemp; Allen Jones; Lawrence Harris; Brian Padilla
- Products: Buffet and steakhouse style restaurants
- Brands: Furr's; HomeTown Buffet; Old Country Buffet; Ryan's Grill, Buffet and Bakery; Tahoe Joe's
- Services: Restaurants
- Parent: Independent (1983–2015); Food Management Partners (2015–2020); Fresh Acquisitions, LLC (2020–2022)
- Website: www.vitanovabrands.com

VitaNova Brands, based in San Antonio, Texas, was an operator of a number of American national buffet chain restaurants including subsidiary company Furr's. The company owned and operated Old Country Buffet, HomeTown Buffet, and Ryan's Buffet, along with Curry House.

The company's restaurants included steak-buffets, as well as steakhouse restaurants with menus that range from grilled-to-order steaks, single-serve dishes, scratch-made soups, entrees and desserts, beverage bars, buffets, chops and grilled seafood, and others. It was previously known as Buffets, Inc. and Ovation Brands.

== History ==
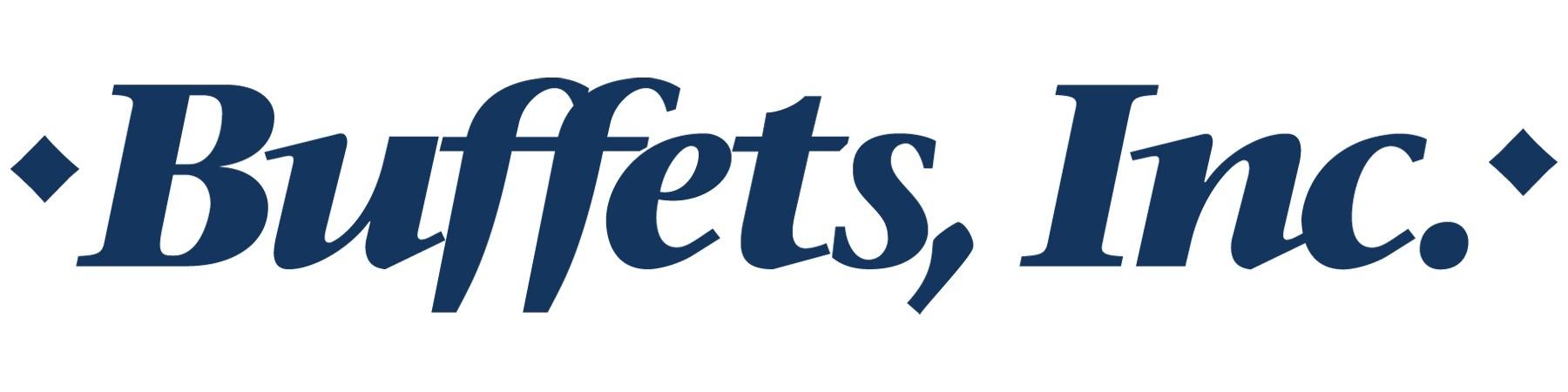
Buffets, Inc. logo

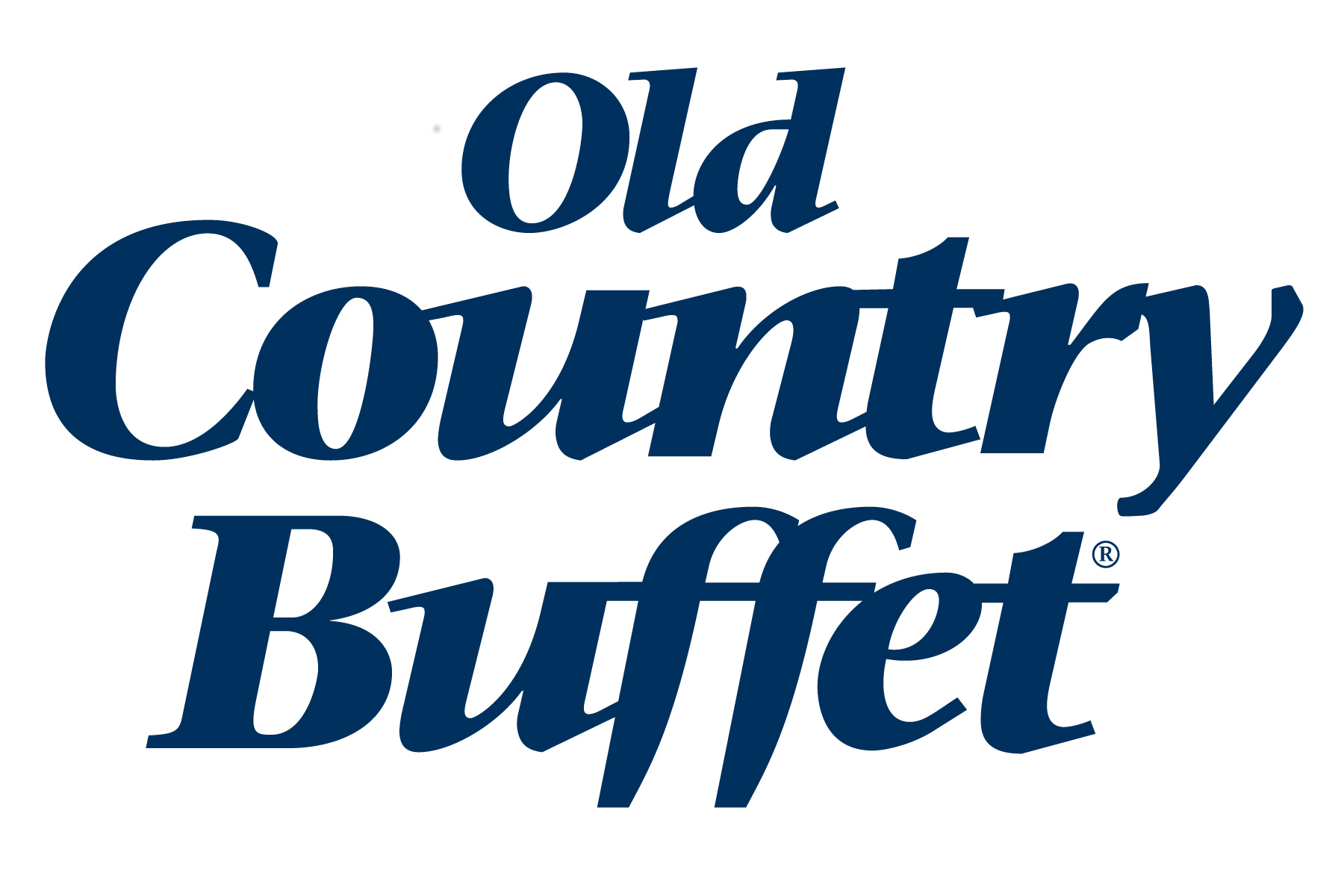
Old Country Buffet logo

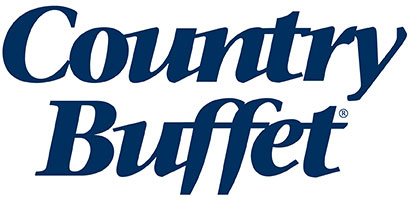
Country Buffet logo

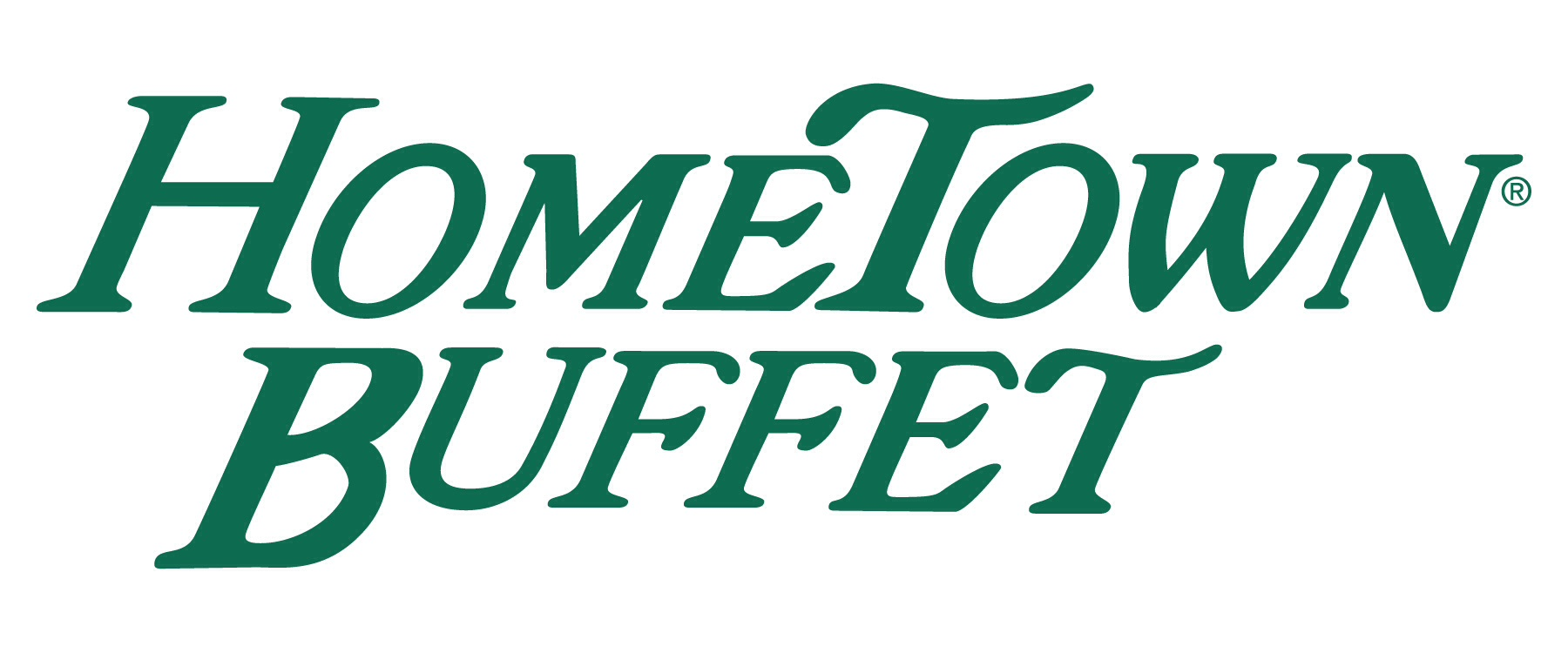
HomeTown Buffet logo

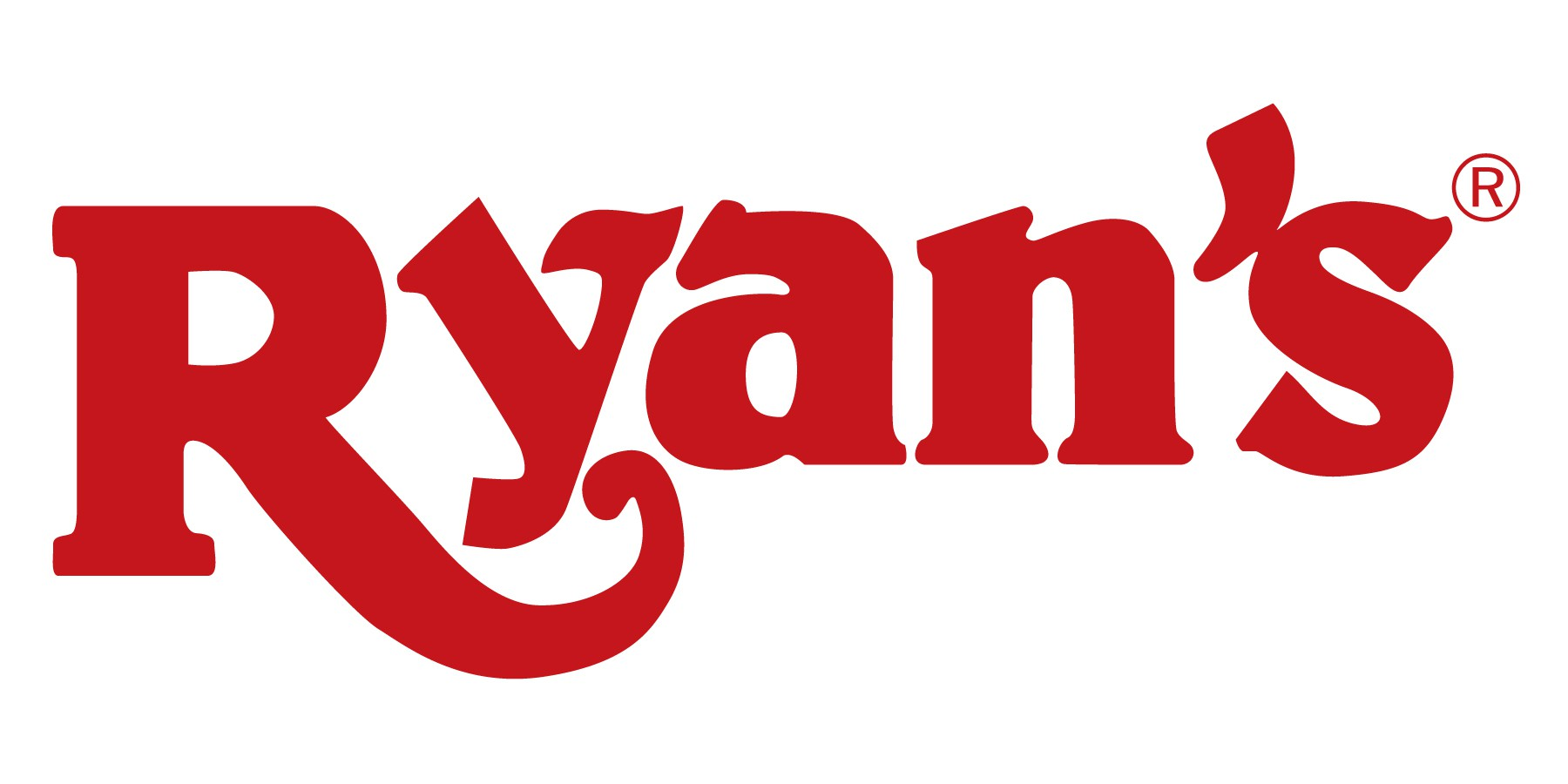
Ryan's Buffet logo

The company was founded by Roe Hatlen and C. Dennis Scott on October 19, 1983, along with Dermot Rowland and Doron Jensen. Rowland and Jensen left in 1986 to start Homestyle Buffet in Clearwater, Florida.

Scott left in 1989 to start HomeTown Buffet, but the two chains merged in September 1996.

Buffets Inc. in the late 1990s posted a net income of $28.6 million in 1997 and $39.4 million in 1998, on revenues of $808.5 million and $868.9 million, respectively. In 1998, the company increased the number of company-owned restaurants from 360 to 386. Part of this increase came from the acquisition of 11 eating establishments from Country Harvest Buffet Restaurants, Inc., for $5.6 million.

On November 1, 2006, Buffets Inc. acquired Ryan's Restaurant Group, adding 340 Ryan's Grill Buffet and Bakery and Fire Mountain Grills locations.

On January 22, 2008, Buffets Inc. filed for bankruptcy, under Chapter 11. Although all restaurants were said to be staying open and continuing to operate normally under the then-current reorganization plan, the company called for the immediate closing of 52 stores nationwide, effective February 12, 2008. The final day of normal business operations in these stores, as well as the announcement of closing to all team members in said stores, took place the previous day.

On April 28, 2009, Buffets Inc. emerged from Chapter 11 reorganization with reduced debt along with a new board of directors.

On January 18, 2012, Buffets, Inc. filed for Chapter 11 bankruptcy protection again. This involved the immediate closure of 81 restaurants throughout the country and recapitalizing in an agreement with its lenders that would convert debt into a controlling equity stake.

On March 7, 2016, Ovation Brands filed for Chapter 11 bankruptcy after closing dozens of locations. The bankruptcy was blamed on a lawsuit that had not been disclosed when the current owner bought the businesses in August 2015. The landlord of 16 of Ovation's locations sued the company in February after the closure of 8 of those units. Buffets LLC, which is an affiliate of Food Management Partners, paid an undisclosed amount in August 2015 for Old Country Buffet, Ryan's, Fire Mountain and Tahoe Joe's, in addition to HomeTown. According to court documents, 150 restaurants that were operated by those chains were part of the bankruptcy filing. According to a court filing by Ovation, the company had $186.3 million in liabilities and $160.2 million in assets.

Due to the COVID-19 pandemic, all of the buffet-style restaurants closed in March 2020. Five locations reopened as "AYCE Marketplaces" in summer 2020. As of January 15, 2021, all Old Country, HomeTown, and Ryan's Buffet locations have permanently closed, and nearly all have been auctioned off by Auction Nation.

On April 20, 2021, both Buffets, LLC (Hometown Buffet, Old Country Buffet, Ryan's, and Tahoe Joe's) and Fresh Acquisitions, LLC (Furr's) filed for Chapter 11 Bankruptcy. Several of the owners of VitaNova Brands and its related entities (Jason Kemp, Allen Jones, Lawrence Harris, and Brian Padilla) have been named in multiple lawsuits alleging serious fraud and theft of money from both their business partners and the federal government. One of these suits was filed by the bankruptcy trustee in the April 20, 2021 bankruptcy case and alleges the theft of $13M of Paycheck Protection Program Loans by Jason Kemp, Allen Jones, Lawrence Harris, and Brian Padilla.

== Chains ==
=== Old Country Buffet ===
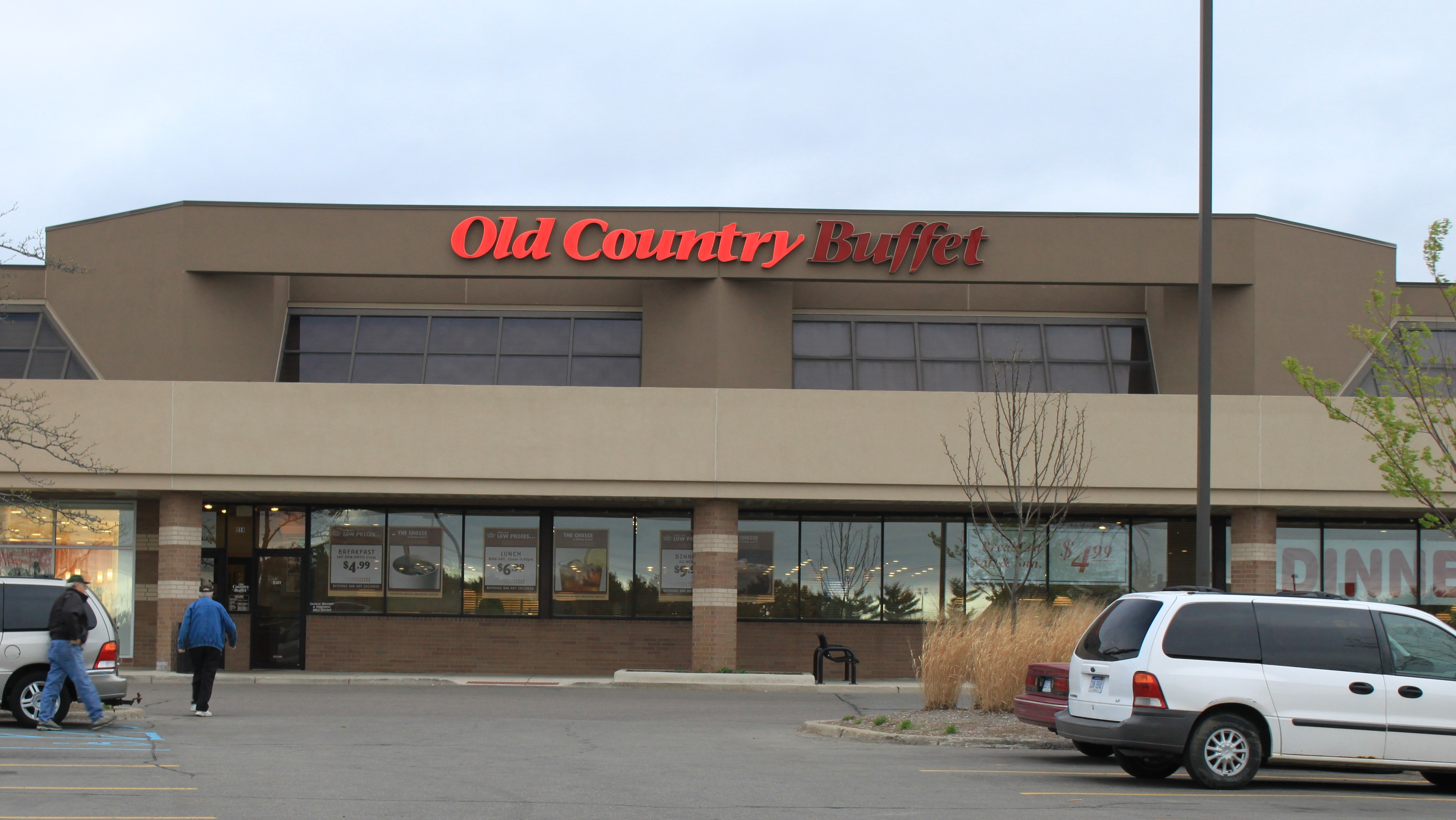
Former Old Country Buffet location in Ann Arbor, Michigan

After the 2020 COVID-19 pandemic, all Old Country Buffet locations closed. The parent company Fresh Acquisitions, LLC and Buffets LLC filed bankruptcy again. In bankruptcy, its IP was sold as a combination with other IPs. The new owners indicated they were uninterested in reopening any stores after acquiring the brand, making the restaurant now non-existent.

At one time, there were more than 600 Old Country Buffet restaurants.

=== HomeTown Buffet ===
At one time, there were more than 250 restaurants open under the HomeTown Buffet brand, primarily in the West Coast and Northeast regions. In the late 1990s, several restaurants rebranded from Old Country Buffet to HomeTown Buffet, when the two chains merged.

=== Ryan's Buffet and Grill/Ryan's Restaurant Group ===
Ryan's was founded by Alvin A. McCall in 1977. It was acquired by Buffets, Inc. on November 1, 2006. Some of its accolades include being named one of the "Best Small Companies in America" for seven consecutive years, and named "Top Family Steakhouse in America" for 10 consecutive years.

Ryan's Restaurants once had more than 400 locations, primarily in the South and Midwest. The last one to close was a location in Horn Lake, Mississippi, which was replaced by a Golden Corral.

=== Other restaurants ===
- Tahoe Joe's Famous Steakhouse has three locations in California.
- Curry House had nine locations in California, until they were shut down without notice on February 24, 2020.

== See also ==
- List of buffet restaurants
