= Victory, Oklahoma =

- Unincorporated community
- Location within Oklahoma Location within the United States
- Coordinates: 34°39′08″N 99°26′20″W
- Country: United States
- State: Oklahoma
- County: Jackson
- Elevation: 1,391 ft (424 m)
- Time zone: UTC-6 (Central (CST))
  - Summer (DST): UTC-5 (CDT)
- Area code: 580
- GNIS feature ID: 1100910

Victory is an unincorporated community in Jackson County, Oklahoma, United States. The community is five miles west of Altus and one mile north of US Route 62. The Salt Fork Red River flows past east of the community.

== Notable person ==
- Herschal Crow, Oklahoma state senator and state cabinet secretary, was born in Victory.
