= Neal McCaleb =

American politician (1935–2025)

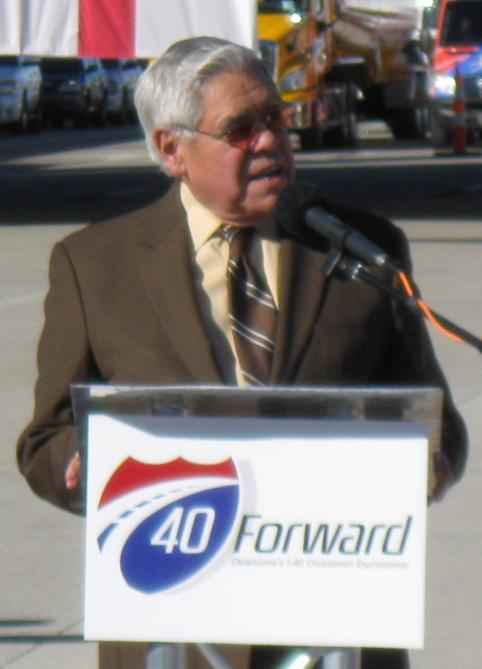
- McCaleb speaking at the opening ceremonies of the Oklahoma City Crosstown Expressway

8th Assistant Secretary of the Interior for Indian Affairs
- In office 2001–2003
- President: George W. Bush
- Preceded by: Kevin Gover
- Succeeded by: David W. Anderson

Oklahoma Secretary of Transportation
- In office January 1995 – July, 2001
- Governor: Frank Keating
- Preceded by: Delmas Ford
- Succeeded by: Herschal Crow
- In office 1987–1991
- Governor: Henry Bellmon
- Preceded by: Position established
- Succeeded by: Delmas Ford

Director of the Oklahoma Department of Transportation and the Oklahoma Turnpike Authority
- In office January, 1995 – July, 2001
- Governor: Frank Keating

Minority Leader of Oklahoma House of Representatives
- In office 1979–1983
- Preceded by: Kent Frates
- Succeeded by: Frank W. Davis

Member of the Oklahoma House of Representatives from the 35th district
- In office 1974–1983
- Preceded by: Jan Turner
- Succeeded by: Steve Sill

Personal details
- Born: June 30, 1935 Oklahoma City, Oklahoma, U.S.
- Died: January 7, 2025 (aged 89)
- Citizenship: American; Chickasaw Nation
- Party: Republican
- Children: 4
- Education: Oklahoma A&M College
- Occupation: Civil Engineer; Politician

Neal A. McCaleb (June 30, 1935 – January 7, 2025) was a Chickasaw civil engineer and politician from Oklahoma. A member of the Republican Party, McCaleb served in several positions in the Oklahoma state government and then as the Assistant Secretary of the Interior for Indian Affairs under President George W. Bush.

== Early life ==
Neal McCaleb, a citizen of the Chickasaw Nation, was born in Oklahoma City, Oklahoma, on June 30, 1935 to Burt and Zelma McCaleb. His father was the director of the Oklahoma Department of Transportation.

McCaleb graduated from Putnam City High School in 1953 and received bachelor's degree in Civil Engineering from Oklahoma State University (then known as Oklahoma A&M College) in 1957. Prior to entering politics, McCaleb was a practicing civil engineer. From 1967 to 1972 he served on the Oklahoma Indian Affairs Commission. In 1975, McCaleb was named the charter Chairman of the American Indian Council of Architects and Engineers.

== Oklahoma politics ==
McCaleb was elected as a Republican to represent the 35th district of the Oklahoma House of Representatives in 1974 succeeding Jan Turner. He was succeeded in office by Steve Sill in 1983. In 1978, McCaleb's colleagues elected him House Minority Leader. He remained in that position until his retirement from the Legislature. In 1982, he unsuccessfully ran for Governor of Oklahoma.

=== Bellmon administration and Oklahoma Good Roads Association ===
Governor of Oklahoma Henry Bellmon appointed McCaleb to serve as the State's first Secretary of Transportation. The post was created following the passage of the Executive Branch Reform Act of 1986. In addition to his service as Secretary, Bellmon appointed him to serve concurrently as Director of the Oklahoma Department of Transportation. McCaleb served in both positions until the end of Bellmon's term in 1991.

During his tenure, he oversaw the building of the Cherokee Turnpike, Kilpatrick Turnpike, Creek Turnpike, and Chickasaw Turnpike. Following the end of Bellmon's term in 1991, McCaleb became the President of the Oklahoma Good Roads and Transportation Association, a lobbying group dedicated to advocating safe, efficient and affordable state streets, roads and highways. He served as president until 1995.

=== Keating administration ===
In 1995, incumbent Governor of Oklahoma David Walters chose not to seek re-election as Governor. Republican Frank Keating was elected to succeed him in that position. Keating appointed McCaleb to serve as his Secretary of Transportation. Additionally, Keating appointed McCaleb as the head of both the Oklahoma Department of Transportation and the Oklahoma Turnpike Authority. McCaleb remained in all three positions until July 2001 when he resigned to take join the George W. Bush administration. Keating appointed Herschal Crow of Tulsa to succeed him as Secretary.

During his tenure he oversaw the extension of the Kilpatrick Turnpike and the H. E. Bailey Turnpike. He also supported Oklahoma's Capital Improvement Plan which allocated funds to state highways and oversaw the opening of the Heartland Flyer.

== National politics ==
=== Presidential appointments ===
McCaleb was appointed by President Richard Nixon to serve on the National Council on Indian Opportunities from 1972 to 1974. He was later appointed by President Ronald Reagan to the Indian Reservation Economies Commission.

=== George W. Bush administration ===
As a member of the Chickasaw Nation, McCaleb was appointed by Republican President George W. Bush in 2001 to be the Assistant Secretary of the Interior for Indian Affairs in the Department of the Interior under Secretary of the Interior Gale Norton. As the head of the Bureau of Indian Affairs, McCaleb was charged with the administration and management of 56 million acres (230,000 km^{2}) of land held in trust by the United States government for Native Americans, Native American tribes, and Alaska Natives.

McCaleb remained in that position until November 2002, when he returned home to Oklahoma. He resigned after being held in contempt of court by Judge Royce Lamberth alongside Gale Norton for violating court orders, but the charges were later dismissed on appeal.

== Chickasaw Nation ==
After leaving federal government service, McCaleb began work as advisor to Bill Anoatubby, Governor of the Chickasaw Nation. McCaleb was tasked by Anoatubby with the development of long-term economic development plans and policy. Anoatubby appointed McCaleb to the board of directors of Chickasaw Community Bank (Note: Formerly known as Bank 2.) a financial industry firm completely owned by the Chickasaw Nation. Anoatubby also made McCaleb the chairman of the board for Chickasaw Nation Industries, a wholly owned subentity of the Nation responsible for promoting economic development for the tribe.

== Personal life and death ==
McCaleb was married and had four children and thirteen grandchildren. He died on January 7, 2025, at the age of 89.

McCaleb was a member of the Oklahoma Hall of Fame, the Chickasaw Hall of Fame, and the Oklahoma State University College of Engineering, Architecture, and Technology Hall of Fame.

== Notes ==
Political offices
Preceded by Jan Turner	Oklahoma State Representative; 1975–1983	Succeeded by Steve Sill
Preceded by	Minority Leader of Oklahoma House of Representatives; 1979–1983	Succeeded by
Preceded by Position established	Oklahoma Secretary of Transportation; Under Governor Henry Bellmon; 1987–1991	Succeeded by Delmas Ford
Preceded by	Director of the Oklahoma Department of Transportation; Under Governor Henry Bellmon; 1987–1991	Succeeded by
Preceded by Delmas Ford	Oklahoma Secretary of Transportation; Under Governor Frank Keating; 1995–2001	Succeeded by Herschal Crow
Preceded by	Director of the Oklahoma Department of Transportation; Under Governor Frank Keating; 1995–2001	Succeeded by Herschal Crow
Preceded by	Director of the Oklahoma Turnpike Authority; Under Governor Frank Keating; 1995–2001	Succeeded by
Preceded by Kevin Gover	Assistant Secretary of the Interior for Indian Affairs; Under President George W. Bush; 2001–2003	Succeeded by Dave Anderson
