= Kevin Gover =

Assistant Secretary of the Interior for Indian Affairs

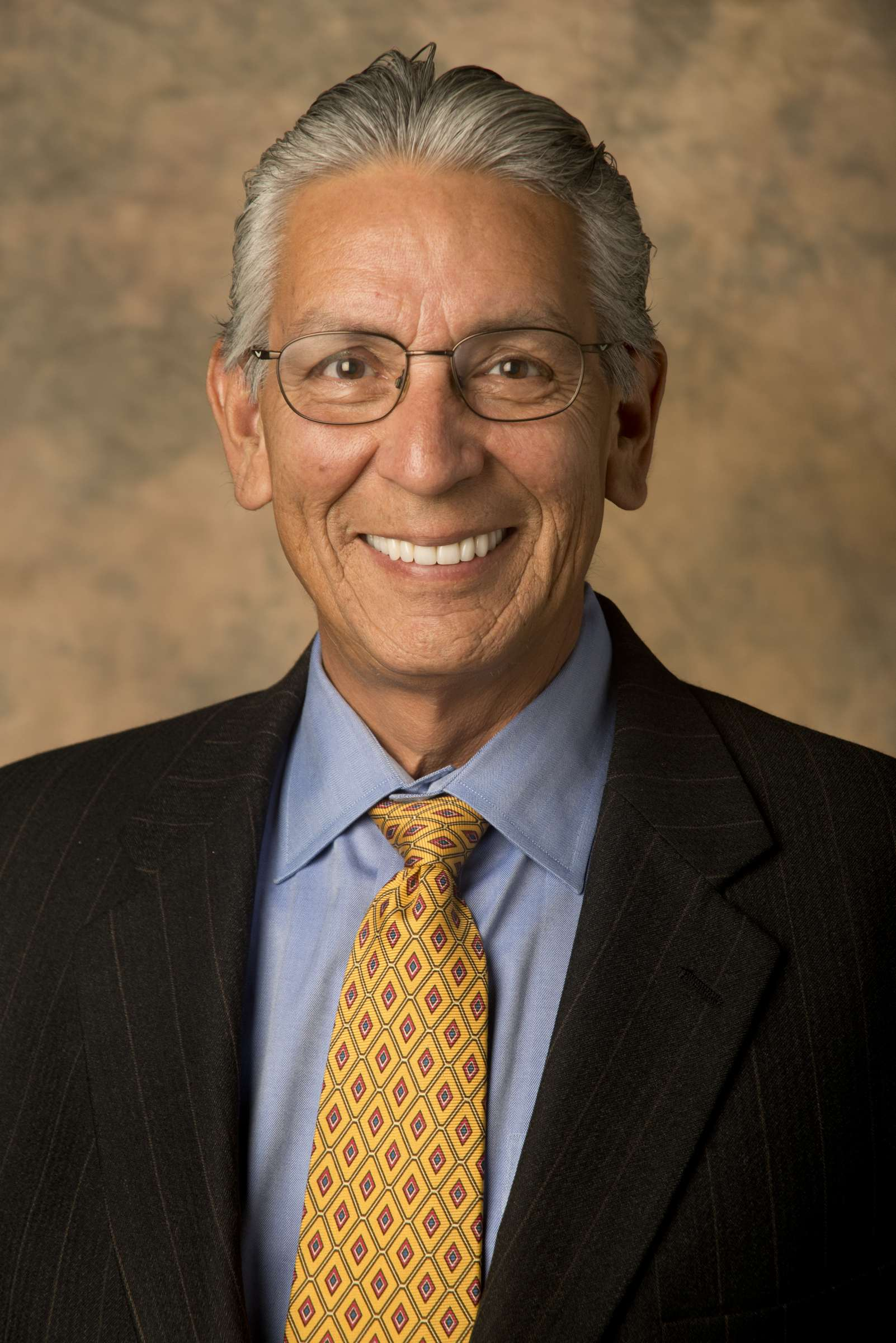

7th Assistant Secretary of the Interior for Indian Affairs
- In office 1997–2001
- President: Bill Clinton
- Preceded by: Ada Deer
- Succeeded by: Neal McCaleb

Personal details
- Born: February 16, 1955 (age 71) Lawton, Oklahoma, U.S.

Kevin Gover (born February 16, 1955) is currently the Under Secretary for Museums and Culture at the Smithsonian. He had served from 2007 until January 2021 as the director of the National Museum of the American Indian. A citizen of the Pawnee Nation of Oklahoma, he previously served as the Assistant Secretary of the Interior for Indian Affairs under President Bill Clinton.

== Background and education ==
Gover was born in 1955 in Lawton, Oklahoma to Indian rights activists Bill and Maggie Gover. He received his bachelor's degree in public and international affairs from Princeton University in 1978. He received his J.D. from the University of New Mexico in 1981.

== Career ==
Until his appointment in the federal government, Gover worked as a lawyer representing Indian tribes and tribal agencies. In 1997 he was nominated by President Clinton to serve as the Assistant Secretary of the Interior for Indian Affairs. His tenure is most remembered for his apology to the Native American people for the past conduct of the Bureau of Indian Affairs.

In addition to his federal service, Gover has served on the faculty of the Sandra Day O'Connor College of Law at Arizona State University.

Political offices
| Preceded by Ada Deer | Assistant Secretary of the Interior for Indian Affairs; Under President Bill Clinton; 1997–2001 | Succeeded by Neal McCaleb |
