= Mike Patterson (transport director) =

American government official

Director of the Oklahoma Department of Transportation
- Incumbent
- Assumed office April 1, 2013
- Governor: Mary Fallin
- Preceded by: Gary Ridley
- Succeeded by: Tim Gatz

J. Michael Patterson is a former director of the Oklahoma Department of Transportation. Patterson was appointed ODOT Director by the Oklahoma Transportation Commission in March 2013, succeeding retiring Director Gary Ridley.

== Career ==
Mike Patterson earned his Bachelor's degree in Accounting and Master's degree in Finance from the University of Central Oklahoma. Patterson first worked for the Oklahoma Department of Transportation (then known as the State Highway Department) in 1970 as a summer intern. His father worked in ODOT's planning division from 1961 to 1987. Patterson joined the Department full time as Deputy Comptroller in 1980 before being promoted to Department Comptroller in 1984. In 1999 he was named Assistant Director of Finance and Administration, serving in that capacity until 2010. In 2010 he was promoted to Deputy Director/Chief Financial Officer of ODOT, the Department's third highest ranking official.

== Personal life ==
Patterson and his wife Joy live in Edmond. They have two daughters and five granddaughters.

Political offices
Preceded by Gary Ridley	Oklahoma Secretary of Transportation; Under Governor Mary Fallin; June 12, 2017–present	Next: Tim Gatz
Preceded by Gary Ridley	Director of the Oklahoma Department of Transportation; Under Governor Mary Fallin; April 1, 2013–present	Succeeded by Tim Gatz
