= David W. Anderson =

American entrepreneur and businessman

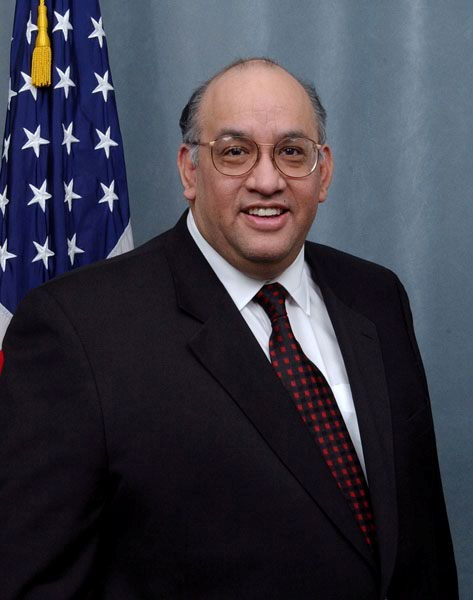

9th Assistant Secretary of the Interior for Indian Affairs
- In office 2004–2005
- President: George W. Bush
- Preceded by: Neal McCaleb
- Succeeded by: Carl J. Artman

Personal details
- Born: Chicago, Illinois
- Party: Republican
- Education: Harvard Kennedy School
- Occupation: Restaurateur, businessman, founder of Famous Dave's restaurants

David W. Anderson, also known as Famous Dave, is an Ojibwe entrepreneur, businessman, and former U.S. government official. Anderson is the founder, namesake, and former head of the barbecue restaurant chain and retail brand Famous Dave's. He also served as Assistant Secretary of the Interior for Indian Affairs from 2004 to 2005 as a member of the George W. Bush administration, overseeing the Bureau of Indian Affairs and the Office of Indian Education Programs. Anderson has since established a second restaurant chain – Old Southern BBQ – and a standalone winery and pizzeria.

Anderson is a citizen of the Lac Courte Oreilles Band of Lake Superior Chippewa Indians and a descendant of the Choctaw Nation, and lives in Edina, Minnesota. He was born in Chicago, Illinois, and grew up there as well as on reservations in Wisconsin. Famous Dave Anderson now travels the country speaking and is the author of several award-winning books.

== Philanthropy ==
In 2001, Anderson and his family founded The LifeSkills Center for Leadership, a 501(c)(3) which provided leadership experiences to at-risk and underprivileged Native American youths.

== Personal life ==
Dave Anderson lives in Edina, Minnesota with his wife, Kathy. He has two kids, James (married to Colleen, née Bubb) and Tim, both residing in Minneapolis. His family still owns and enjoys property in Hayward, Wisconsin, beside the LCO Reservation.

== See also ==
- Famous Dave's
- Native American gaming
- Bureau of Indian Affairs

Political offices
| Preceded by Neal McCaleb | Assistant Secretary of the Interior for Indian Affairs; Under President George W. Bush; 2004–2005 | Succeeded by Carl J. Artman |
