= Furr's =

U.S. chain of family restaurants

- Company type: Subsidiary
- Industry: Food
- Founded: 1946; 79 years ago in Hobbs, New Mexico, U.S.
- Defunct: April 1, 2021
- Fate: Chapter 11 bankruptcy
- Headquarters: San Antonio, Texas, U.S.
- Key people: Jason Kemp (President & CEO (formerly CFO)); Allen Jones (former President & COO); Larry Harris (former Chairman)
- Parent: Independent (1946–1980 and 2000–2003); Kmart (1980–1988); Limited National Partnership (1988–2000); CIC-Buffet Partners (2003–2014); Food Management Partners (2014–2020); Fresh Acquisitions, LLC (2020–2021)
- Website: furrs.net at the Wayback Machine (archived 13 March 2021)

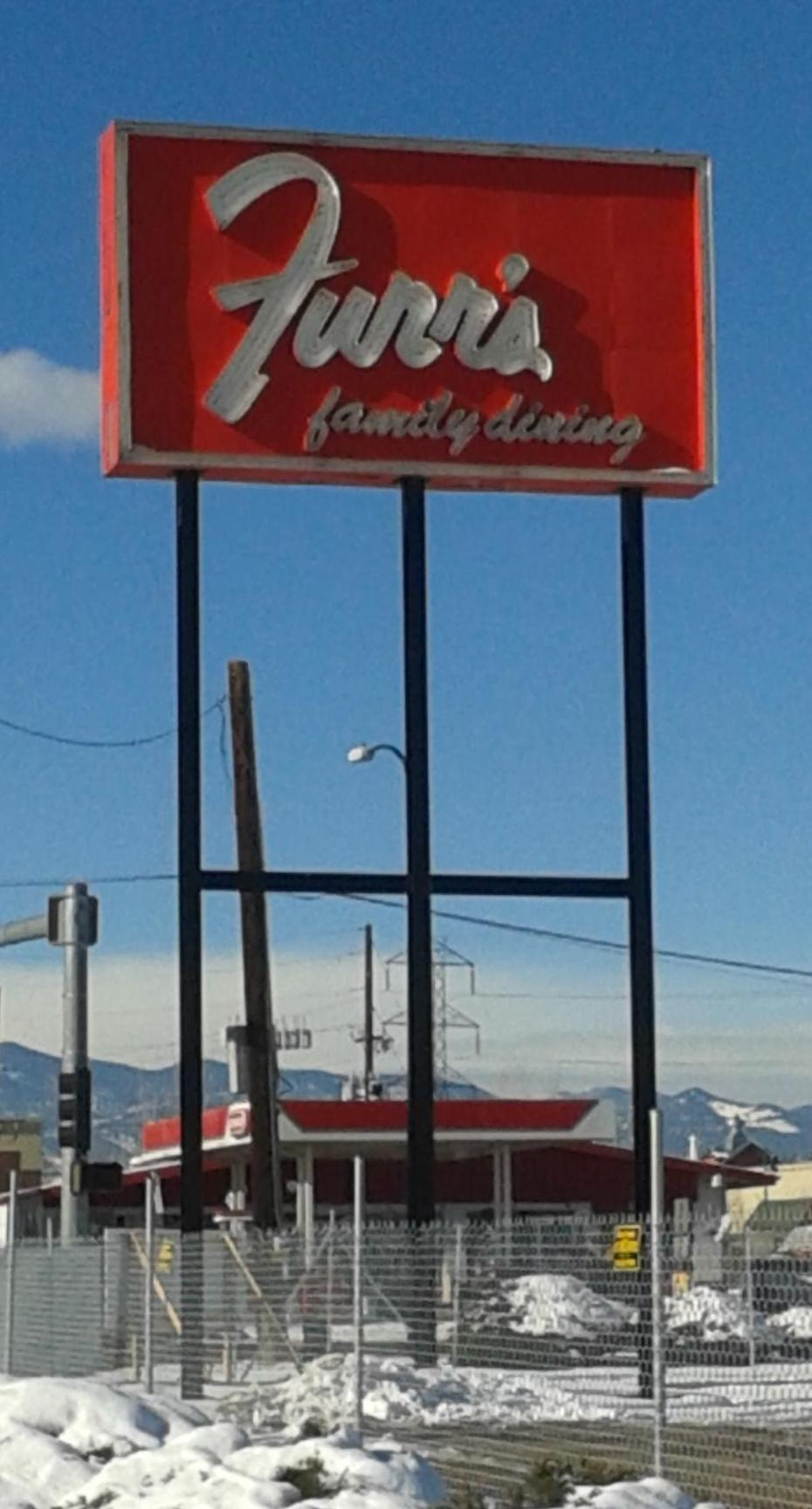
Furr's sign after demolition of the last Colorado location

Furr's (also known as Furr's Cafeteria, Furr's Family Dining, Furr's Fresh Buffet, and Furr's All-You-Can-Eat Marketplace) was a chain of family restaurants in the United States started by Roy Furr. The first location opened in 1946 in Hobbs, New Mexico. For many decades, Furr's was known for cafeteria-style dining but eventually redeveloped into buffet-style dining.

== History ==
In 1946, brothers Roy and Key Furr founded the first Furr's restaurant, which opened in Hobbs in southeastern New Mexico. A second location was opened in Odessa, Texas, in 1947.

Furr's was purchased by the Kmart Corp. in 1980, and subsequently sold by Kmart to Michael Levenson's Limited National Partnership in 1988.

In 1998, its corporate history was notable for having its board of directors ousted by an institutional investor TIAA-CREF.

In 2000, the company established a new name, Furr's Restaurant Group. In December 2002, Furr's closed its two locations in Las Vegas as part of a corporate downsizing plan to close 11 under-performing restaurants across the United States by the end of the year. The company reorganized under Chapter 11 bankruptcy in January 2003. Shortly afterward, the company was sold to a private investment firm, CIC-Buffet Partners, an affiliate of Cardinal Investment Co.

In January 2014, Furr's closed several locations, including Las Cruces, New Mexico, Big Spring, Texas, Wheat Ridge, Colorado, and Wichita, Kansas. "We are closed for business," says assistant general manager Tim Arnoldussen. "It's just a corporate decision."

In June 2014, Furr's Fresh Buffet was sold to a San Antonio company (Food Management Partners), which planned to begin opening new sites. The following year, the parent company of Furr's acquired Ovation Brands.

In April 2019, a Furr's location closed unexpectedly in Plainview, Texas. On August 26, 2019, another Furr's location did the same in Lubbock, Texas across from the South Plains Mall.

On April 21, 2021, Furr's parent companies Fresh Acquisitions LLC filed for Bankruptcy and all Furr's were permanently closed. Several of the owners of Fresh Acquisitions and its related entities (Jason Kemp, Allen Jones, Lawrence Harris, and Brian Padilla) have been named in multiple lawsuits alleging serious fraud and theft of money from both their business partners and the federal government. One of these suits was filed by the bankruptcy trustee in the April 20, 2021 bankruptcy case and alleges the theft of $13M of Paycheck Protection Program Loans by Jason Kemp, Allen Jones, Lawrence Harris, and Brian Padilla.
