= Herschal Crow =

American politician

Oklahoma Secretary of Transportation
- In office June 2001 – January 2003
- Governor: Frank Keating
- Preceded by: Neal McCaleb
- Succeeded by: Phil Tomlinson

Member of the Oklahoma Senate from the 25th district
- In office 1969–1983
- Preceded by: Anthony M. Massad
- Succeeded by: District eliminated (Note: The district was recreated in 2003 and represented by Charles Ford.)

Personal details
- Born: Herschal Hillear Crow, Jr. March 30, 1935 Victory, Oklahoma, U.S.
- Died: July 22, 2015 (aged 80) Oklahoma City, Oklahoma
- Party: Democratic

Herschal Hillear Crow, Jr. (March 30, 1935 – July 22, 2015) was an American politician in the state of Oklahoma.

Crow was educated at Oklahoma State University and was a farmer, businessman and former teacher. He was elected to the Oklahoma State Senate in 1968 for the 25th district and served until 1983. From 2001 to 2003, he served as the Oklahoma Secretary of Transportation. He was married with two children. He died after surgery for a broken hip in 2015.
