= Terrence L. Bracy =

American activist

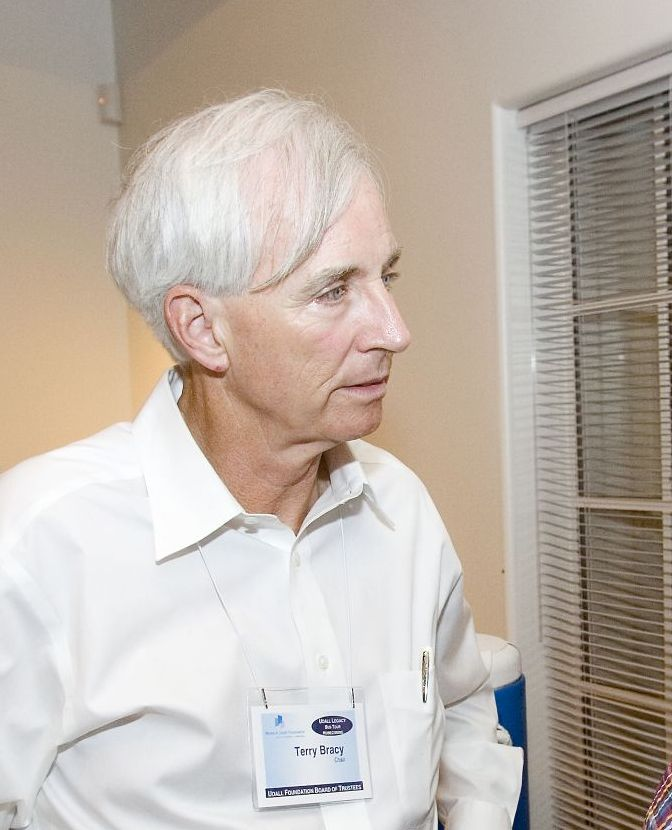
Bracy in 2007

Terrence L. Bracy, a St. Louis native, is an expert on congressional legislation. As an aide to former congressman Morris K. Udall, Terry Bracy did crucial behind-the-scenes work on important reform measures, including the Alaska Native Claims Act, the Campaign Reform Acts of 1971 and 1974, the Colorado River Basin Act of 1968, as well as numerous other bills dealing with parks and wilderness, clean energy technologies, and governmental reorganization.

Terry Bracy served as an aide to Congressman Udall from 1966 to 1976. He convinced Congressman Udall to run for president in 1976 and conceived Udall's successful campaign strategy, at a time when very few congressmen ran for president.

In January 1977, President Jimmy Carter appointed Terry Bracy Assistant Secretary of Transportation. From 1977 to 1979, Bracy was a major player in the advent of airbags in cars, and of the nation's first fuel economy standards. He was also the department's liaison to Congress, to the White House, to the nation's governors and mayors, and to the press. Bracy led the effort to put the first user fee on America's waterway system, and in 1979 he led the first Federal effort to "reinvent the auto" and modernize Detroit.

In 1981, Bracy founded the consulting firm that is now Bracy Tucker Brown and Valanzano, and has directed that firm ever since. Bracy Tucker has had many Fortune 500 clients, as well as major U.S. cities, airports, Native American tribes, European and Asian concerns and the U.S. government.

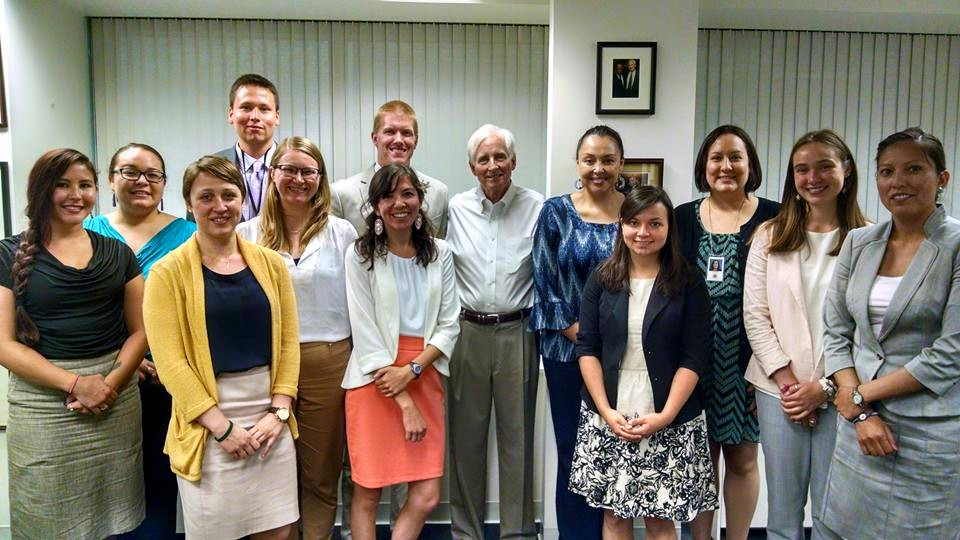
Terry Bracy with the twentieth class of Udall Native Interns who serve in Congress and the Executive Branch.

In 1992, the Udall Foundation was established by the U.S. Congress to honor the 30-year legacy of public service by Congressman Mo Udall and enhanced in 2009 to honor Secretary Stewart L. Udall. In 1994, Terry Bracy was appointed by President Bill Clinton to the board of trustees of the Udall Foundation and subsequently elected the first chair. He was reappointed by President Clinton in 1998, and by President George W. Bush in 2006. Bracy led the foundation from its first class of Udall Scholars in 1995 and under his leadership, the foundation also created the Native American Internship on Capitol Hill, co-founded the Native Nations Institute, and accepted from Congress the stewardship of the US Institute for Environmental Conflict Resolution.

On October 27, 2011, Bracy stepped down from his role as chair of the Udall Foundation board. There was a dinner to honor Bracy and his distinguished service to the Udall Foundation the same day in Tucson, Ariz. Bill Bradley, former three-term U.S. Senator from New Jersey and 2000 presidential candidate, was the keynote speaker at the dinner. "Terry Bracy is a true master of the legislative process. He is smart, intuitive, trustworthy, knows his business, and he really cares about the mission of the Udall Foundation," said Senator Bradley. Bracy is now "retired chair emeritus" of the foundation.

Several elected officials issued formal statements about Bracy's contributions to the Udall Foundation. "Terry's dedicated service has been critical to advancing the tremendous legacies of Mo and Stewart Udall," said Senator John McCain of Arizona. "I wish him the best." "Terry served many years to make sure the Udall legacy would be enshrined in the national consciousness, not just today but in the future," said Congressman Raúl Grijalva of Arizona. "He has the sincere thanks of all of us who know how important the Udall Foundation and its work are to this country. I was happy to work with him, and he will be missed." Senator Mark Udall of Colorado made a statement on the floor of the U.S. Senate about Bracy. "In light of his impending retirement from the Udall Foundation board, it is fitting that we commemorate Terry's groundbreaking work on behalf of the foundation." In addition, Senator Tom Udall of New Mexico made a similar floor statement, noting "The Udall Foundation would not be what it is today without the tireless work of one man--Terrence L. Bracy." There was significant media attention regarding Bracy stepping down. On the occasion of his retirement, an annual award was created in Bracy's honor. The Terrence L. Bracy Distinguished Alumnus Award recognizes outstanding contributions from Udall alumni in four principal areas of public service: conflict resolution, environmental work, health care (including social services), and tribal public policy.

Bracy was married to Nancy Kay Muhlitner in 1966. They have two sons, Michael and Timothy, and three grandchildren.

== Education and work ==
In 1964, Bracy received his undergraduate degree from St. Louis University. He received his graduate degree in political science from the University of Arizona.

Bracy has written numerous articles on public affairs issues for many periodicals, including The New York Times, St. Louis Post-Dispatch, and The Washington Post. He is a frequent op-ed contributor to the Arizona Daily Star.

Bracy has frequently testified before Congress.

Early in his career, Bracy was news editor at the NBC affiliate in Tucson, Arizona. He also taught courses in American government at the University of Arizona.

Bracy has been a guest lecturer at the Brookings Institution, Harvard University, the University of Missouri, and St. Louis University. In 2010, he was named Special Lecturer, Washington Program, at the University of Missouri School of Journalism.

Terry Bracy also played a key role in the adoption of the Elwha River Ecosystem and Fisheries Restoration Act that has largely restored the fisheries and ecosystem of the Elwha River basin in Washington State.

On September 17, 2011, numerous officials and Lower Elwha Klallam tribal members attended a ceremony kicking off the demolition of two dams on the Elwha River. At a dinner the night before in Port Angeles, Washington, former Senator Bill Bradley delivered formal remarks and discussed Bracy's work on the Elwha.

I also want to say a nice thing about one of the best lobbyists that Washington has ever known. I actually refer to him as an advocate, not a lobbyist. The Elwha settlement was extremely fortunate that one of the major players in the negotiations, Daishowa America, chose to be represented in Washington by Terry Bracy. Terry had been Mo Udall's chief of staff. Terry knows exactly how Capitol Hill works. Terry was a creature of the House, but he knew the Senate equally well and was a true master of the legislative process. He was smart, intuitive, trustworthy, and knew his business. He had the unenviable job of explaining Congress to a foreign-owned paper company, and convincing very skeptical business people that their interest lay in a deal that would separate their mill from the generators that fed it power. For most of the last 20 years since the settlement, Terry has chaired the Udall foundation, the premier grantor of college scholarships for Native Americans, and as Chair led the establishment of the U.S. Institute for Environmental Conflict Resolution. I've heard him say that the Elwha settlement was a major inspiration for the creation of what is now the nations' most prestigious and successful environmental dispute resolution center. We owe Terry our deepest thanks.

In a written evaluation of his work, Assoc. Prof. Wesley G. Pippert, director-emeritus of Missouri Journalism's Washington Program, said: "Bracy's skill and abilities are as keen in a classroom as they have been in Congress, the Cabinet, and the business world. He has a passion for helping young people, including students from all cultures, to get ahead. His seminars have been one of the highlights of our Washington Program."
