= Klamath Termination Act =

1953 law ending special status of Native American tribes

The Klamath Termination Act was a 1953 law under the US Indian termination policy. The Klamath tribe along with the Flathead, Menominee, Potawatomi, and Turtle Mountain Chippewa, as well as all tribes in the states of California, New York, Florida, and Texas were targeted for immediate termination by House Concurrent Resolution 108 of 1953. The statement which was issued 1 August 1953 by the United States Congress announced the official beginning of the federal Indian termination policy. The tribes that were listed as being ready for immediate termination had been placed on a list prepared by acting Commissioner of Indian Affairs, William Zimmerman, because they met four primary criteria: adequate resources, they had adopted to a certain degree the cultural traits of the larger American culture, they were willing to terminate federal trust obligations, and the state was willing to assume jurisdiction over their criminal and civil matters.

== Background ==
In the 1950s, the Klamath tribe in Oregon was one of the strongest and wealthiest tribes in the nation. They had created a vigorous economy based on timber resources and imported livestock, which nearly fully supported the entire tribe. The Klamath tribe was not a burden to the Oregon taxpayers, and was the only tribe in the country paying its share of BIA administrative costs. However, despite appearances, 82% of the tribe members living "on" the reservation had no jobs and most still engaged in hunting and fishing for subsistence. As for acculturation, although Klamath students were enrolled in public high schools, only 10 graduated between 1934 and 1947 and in the mid-1950s more than half of the Klamath students enrolled did not pass to the next grade. Though the Klamath who lived "off" the reservation were more prepared for living in the mainstream society, the occupants of the reservation had no concept of rent, utility payments, taxes, banking or even how they would meet their dietary needs.

== Termination ==
In spite of testimony and evidence given, the Klamath tribe was terminated under the Klamath Termination Act, or Public Law 587, enacted on August 13, 1954. Under this act, all federal supervision over Klamath lands, as well as federal aid provided to the Klamath because of their special status as Indians, was ended. The legislation required each tribal member to choose between remaining a member of the tribe, or withdrawing and receiving a monetary payment for the value of the individual share of tribal land. Those who stayed became members of a tribal management plan. This plan became a trust relationship between tribal members and the United States National Bank in Portland, Oregon. Of the 2,133 members of the Klamath tribe at the time of termination, 1,660 decided to withdraw from the tribe and accept individual payments for land.

Oregon Senator Richard L. Neuberger, and Oregon Representative Albert Ullman, worked together to delay implementation of the Klamath termination law until hearings with the Indians were held and amendments could be made. In spite of testimony from experts, BIA officials and tribe members, the Klamath were terminated in 1961 as a result of constant pressure by Republican Senator Arthur V. Watkins.

The termination legislation required the land to be sold in 5000 acre increments and the US Government only accepted forestland. The politically-influential Crown-Zellerbach paper corporation of San Francisco obtained 90,000 acres, and the remaining 93% was converted to the Winema and Fremont National Forests. The reservation shrunk from 762,000 acres to 145,000 acres.

== Modoc controversy ==
The termination of the Klamath Reservation, in actuality included three distinct but affiliated tribes. The Act defines the members as the "Klamath and Modoc Tribes and the Yahooskin Band of Snake Indians, and of the individual members thereof". A portion of the Modoc Tribe, had been taken as prisoners to Indian Territory in 1873 following the Modoc War in Oregon. Later, they were placed on a reservation in Indian Territory and their lands were allotted as were other tribes to make way for statehood for Oklahoma. In 1909, the US Congress passed an Act allowing those Modocs to return to their traditional home in Oregon and take up residence on the Klamath Reservation. Some returned, and some remained in Oklahoma, Kansas and Missouri, where they had now established homes and ties. In 1965, as a part of the US settlement with the Klamath reservation, a series of hearings were held from April to August. At the hearings, testimony was heard regarding the notice given to the western Modoc at the time of the termination of the Klamath Reservation. William Randall, Representative from Missouri's 5th District, observed on 13 May 1965 that he had reviewed notices that appeared in the Federal Register between 14 January 1955 and 12 August 1961 regarding the Klamath termination and none mentioned the Modoc. His and other testimony presented at the hearing made it clear that many western Modoc had not registered for the final roll, were unaware that the Klamath termination applied to them, and felt that they should not be excluded from claim reparations due by the United States to the tribe as a whole for historic breaches. The hearings concluded without allowing the Oklahoma Modoc to be included in the rolls of the Klamath Tribe.

== Hunting and fishing rights ==
Termination led to lawsuits, as individual Klamath Natives struggled to preserve treaty hunting and fishing rights. Five Klamath Natives who had withdrawn from the tribe after Public Law 587 claimed they retained hunting and fishing rights guaranteed to the Klamath tribe in the Treaty of October 16, 1854. After a U.S. district court ruled against them, they filed an appeal under Kimball v. Callahan.

Based on reasoning similar to that in Menominee Tribe v. United States, the U.S. District Court of Appeals of the Ninth Circuit found that, since the Klamath Termination Act did not specifically abrogate Klamath hunting and fishing rights, these rights remained. The court looked at the stipulation in Public Law 280, providing that no state could deprive a Native tribe (or individual members) of hunting and fishing rights guaranteed to them by federal treaty.

== Restoration ==
Within the tribe, termination had been supported only by a few who were loyal to Sen. Watkins. After being terminated, the tribe was cut off from services for education, health care, housing and related resources. Termination directly caused decay within the tribe including poverty, alcoholism, high suicide rates, low educational achievement, disintegration of the family, poor housing, high dropout rates from school, disproportionate numbers in penal institutions, increased infant mortality, decreased life expectancy, and loss of identity.

Ironically, the western Modoc were restored to tribal status 15 May 1978, in an Act which reinstated the Modoc, Wyandotte, Peoria and Ottawa Tribes of Oklahoma. Almost a decade later, through the leadership and vision of the Klamath people, and the assistance of a few congressional leaders, the Klamath Restoration Act was adopted into law in 1986, reestablishing the Klamath as a sovereign state.

== See also ==
- Oregon Dept. of Fish and Wildlife v. Klamath Indian Tribe
