= Famous Dave's =

Chain of barbecue restaurants primarily located in the Midwestern US

Famous Dave's of America, Inc.
- Company type: Subsidiary
- Traded as: Nasdaq: DAVE
- Industry: Restaurant Franchising
- Founded: June 23, 1994; 31 years ago, in Hayward, Wisconsin, United States
- Founder: Dave Anderson
- Headquarters: Minnetonka, Minnesota, United States
- Number of locations: 115
- Key people: Albert Hank; Adam Lehr (COO)
- Products: Barbecue ribs, beef brisket, chicken, burgers, soups, salads, desserts
- Parent: BBQ Holdings
- Website: famousdaves.com/home

Famous Dave's of America, Inc. is a chain of barbecue restaurants primarily located in the Midwestern United States, serving pork ribs, chicken, beef brisket, and several flavors of barbecue sauce. Dave Anderson, an Ojibwe-Choctaw who served as the head of the federal Bureau of Indian Affairs from 2004 to 2005, started the first Famous Dave's restaurant near Hayward, Wisconsin in 1994. The restaurant chain grew throughout the United States and Puerto Rico in 2014, though all of Famous Dave's Puerto Rico locations closed after Hurricane Maria. It has 111 locations in 30 U.S. states as of 2026 and four international locations, Abu Dhabi, Al Ain, Dubai, and Winnipeg.

== History ==
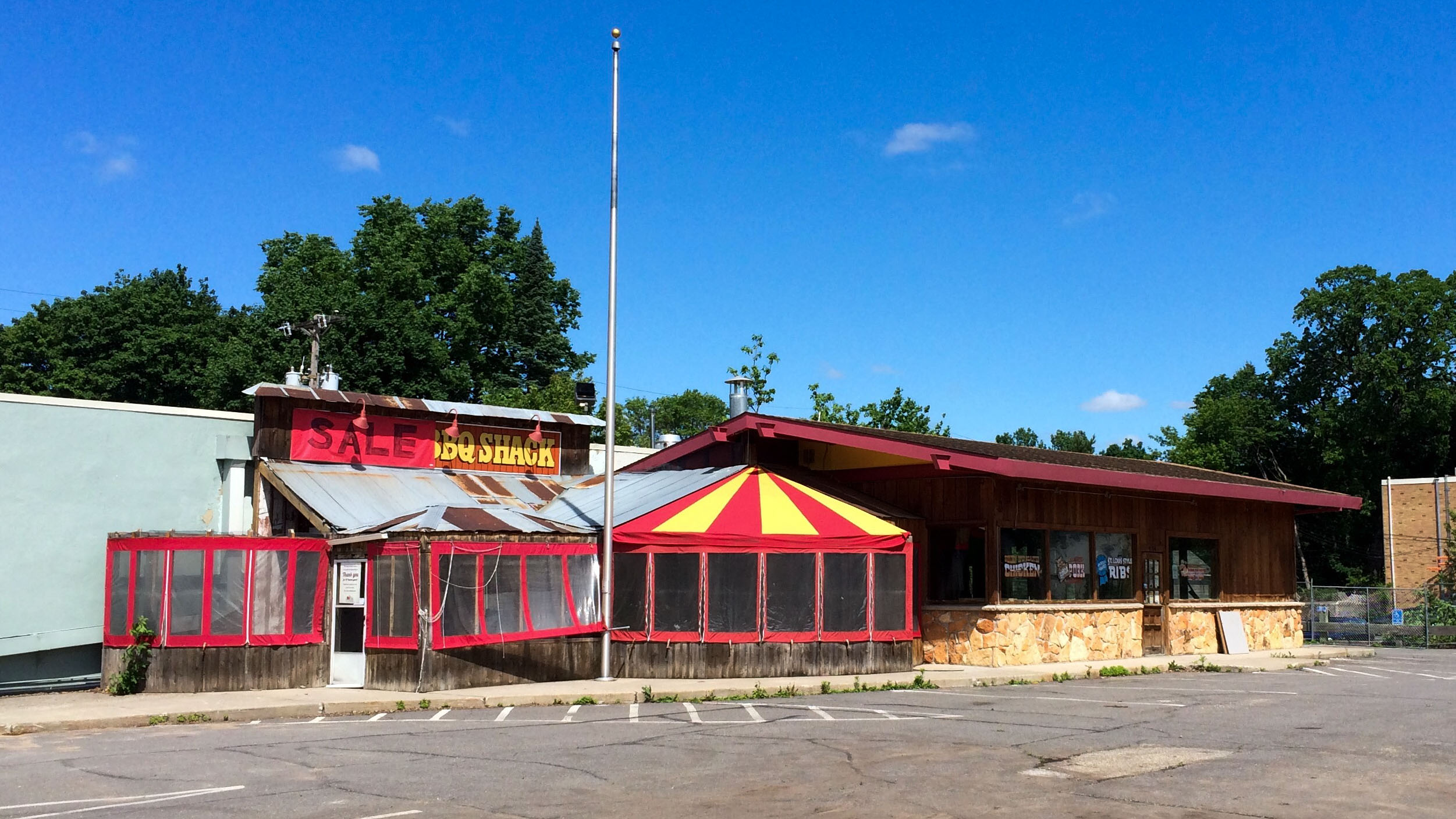
Famous Dave's second location was in the Linden Hills neighborhood of Minneapolis and was built in 1995 to look like a classic BBQ shack; it was demolished in 2016.

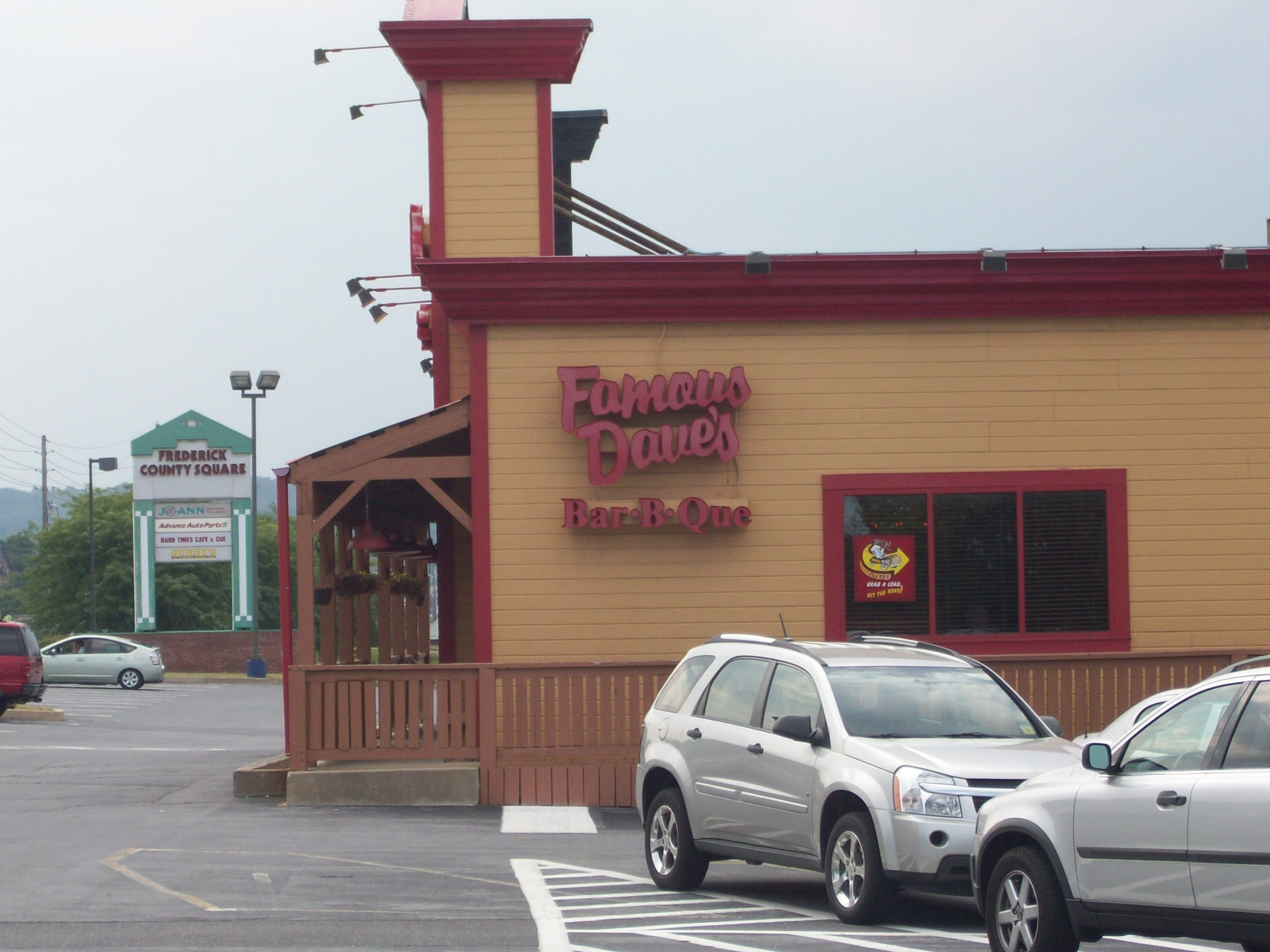
Exterior of a Famous Dave's in Frederick, Maryland (now closed)

The first restaurant of the chain was Famous Dave's Bar-B-Que in Hayward, Wisconsin. On the morning of November 3, 2014, it was destroyed by fire. The second location opened in the Linden Hills neighborhood of Minneapolis, Minnesota in 1995 and was designed to be an old-fashioned "roadside BBQ Shack". It closed in 2014. The third location opened in 1996 in the Calhoun Square development in Uptown Minneapolis and was designed as a Blues club, Famous Dave's BBQ & Blues. It closed in 2019. A "Lodge" format opened in Minnetonka, Minnesota and the first franchise-operated restaurant opened in Burnsville, Minnesota.

Jeff Crivello became CEO at Famous Dave's in 2017. The company rebranded as BBQ Holdings and, in 2020, began buying up other brands. The company sold to MTY Food Group in 2022. Crivello left BBQ Holdings in May 2023.

== Dave Anderson ==
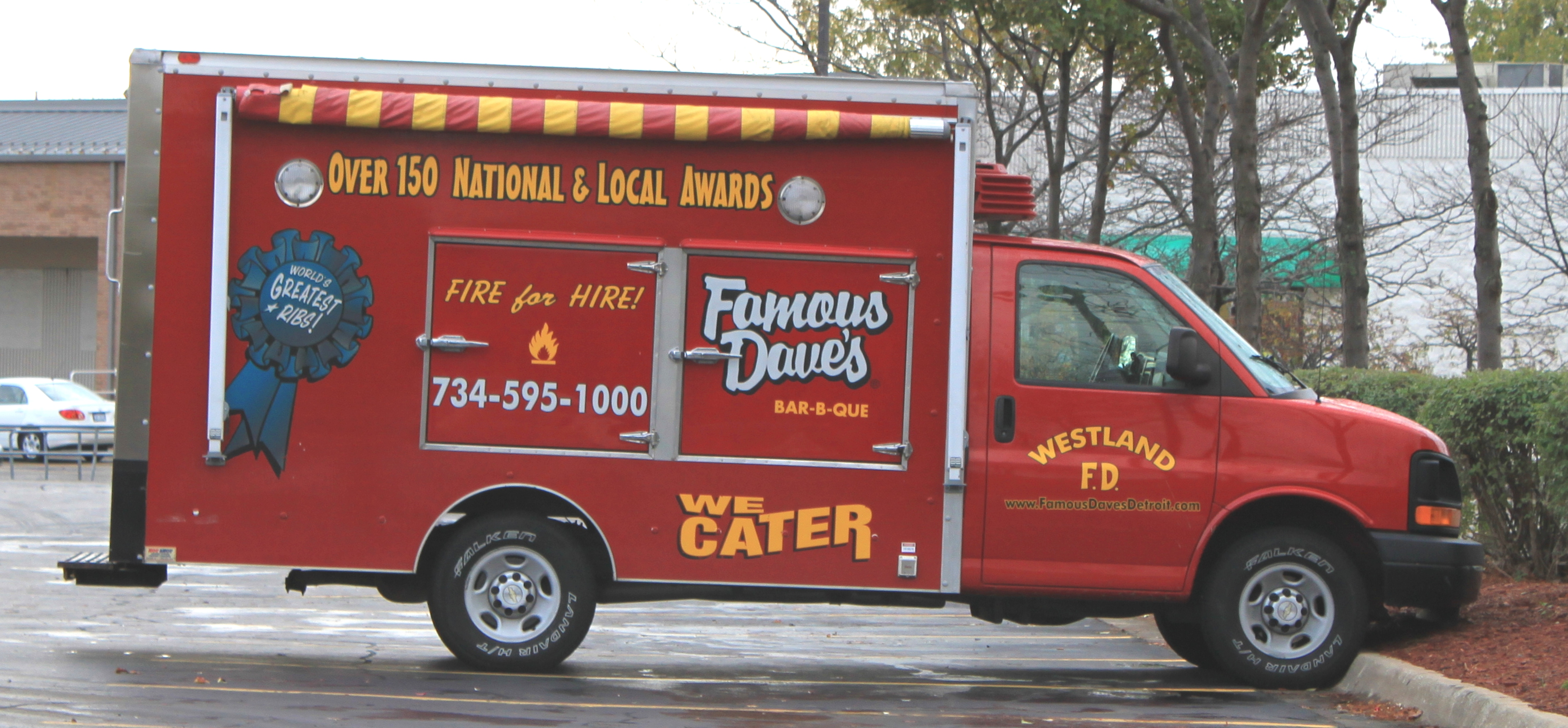
Famous Dave's catering truck, Westland, Michigan

In 1986, Anderson earned a master's degree in Public Administration from Harvard University, without earning an undergraduate degree.

In 1994, he was one of the first investors in Rainforest Café, a theme restaurant chain, and in October 1994, Dave Anderson opened the first Famous Dave's in Hayward, Wisconsin. Two years after opening in Hayward, the company went public in 1996. Anderson stated on Facebook that the IPO was "the worst decision of his life". Anderson was Famous Dave's CEO until 1997, and remained chairman of the company's board until 2003. Anderson ended his relationship with Famous Dave's in March 2014, signing a one-year non-compete agreement, after which he opened Jimmie's Old Southern Smokehouse BBQ.

== See also ==
- List of barbecue restaurants
