= Oklahoma Space Industry Development Authority =

Space agency of Oklahoma

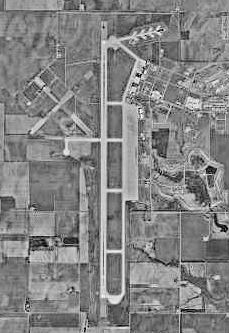
- Excelsior

Agency overview
- Formed: 2009
- Jurisdiction: State of Oklahoma
- Parent department: Oklahoma Department of Aerospace and Aeronautics
- Website: spaceport.ok.gov

The Oklahoma Space Industry Development Authority (OSIDA) is a development authority created by the state of Oklahoma to operate a spaceport near Burns Flat, Oklahoma.

In July 2025, OSIDA was merged into the Oklahoma Department of Aerospace and Aeronautics (ODAA).

== History ==
The Oklahoma Space Industry Development Authority (OSIDA) was established by the Oklahoma Legislature in 74 O.S. § 74-5203 in December 2009.

The first executive director of the Authority was Bill Khourie. Craig Smith became the new executive director in 2020 upon Khourie's retirement after 18 years of service.

On June 12, 2025, the OSIDA announced Dawn Aerospace had selected Clinton-Sherman as its Aurora spaceplane home base. Operations of the rocket-powered, remotely piloted aircraft are expected as early as 2027.

On July 1, 2025, the OSIDA merged with the Oklahoma Department of Aerospace (ODAA). The merger was a result of a new law in Oklahoma, Senate Bill 912. The new law states that the director of the ODAA will serve as OSIDA's CEO in addition to ODAA serving as the board for OSIDA. While OSIDA would technically remain a separate entity from the Department of Aerospace and Aeronautics, all employees of OSIDA were transferred to the Department.

== Facilities ==
The Authority's primary asset is the former Clinton-Sherman Industrial Airpark, a former military airport featuring a redundant 13,503-foot-long paved runway. The airpark was renamed the Infinity One Oklahoma Spaceport on April 14, 2026. Although the Oklahoma Spaceport received a Commercial Space Transportation license from the U.S. Federal Aviation Administration in June 2006, the Spaceport has not yet hosted any sub-orbital spaceflights or launches of spacecraft into earth orbit. However, the facility is still listed as an FAA currently-licensed launch site as of June 2020.

== See also ==
- California Space Authority
- New Mexico Spaceport Authority
- Space Florida
- Virginia Commercial Space Flight Authority
