= Oklahoma Department of Transportation =

State government agency in Oklahoma

Oklahoma Department of Transportation (ODOT)
- Seal

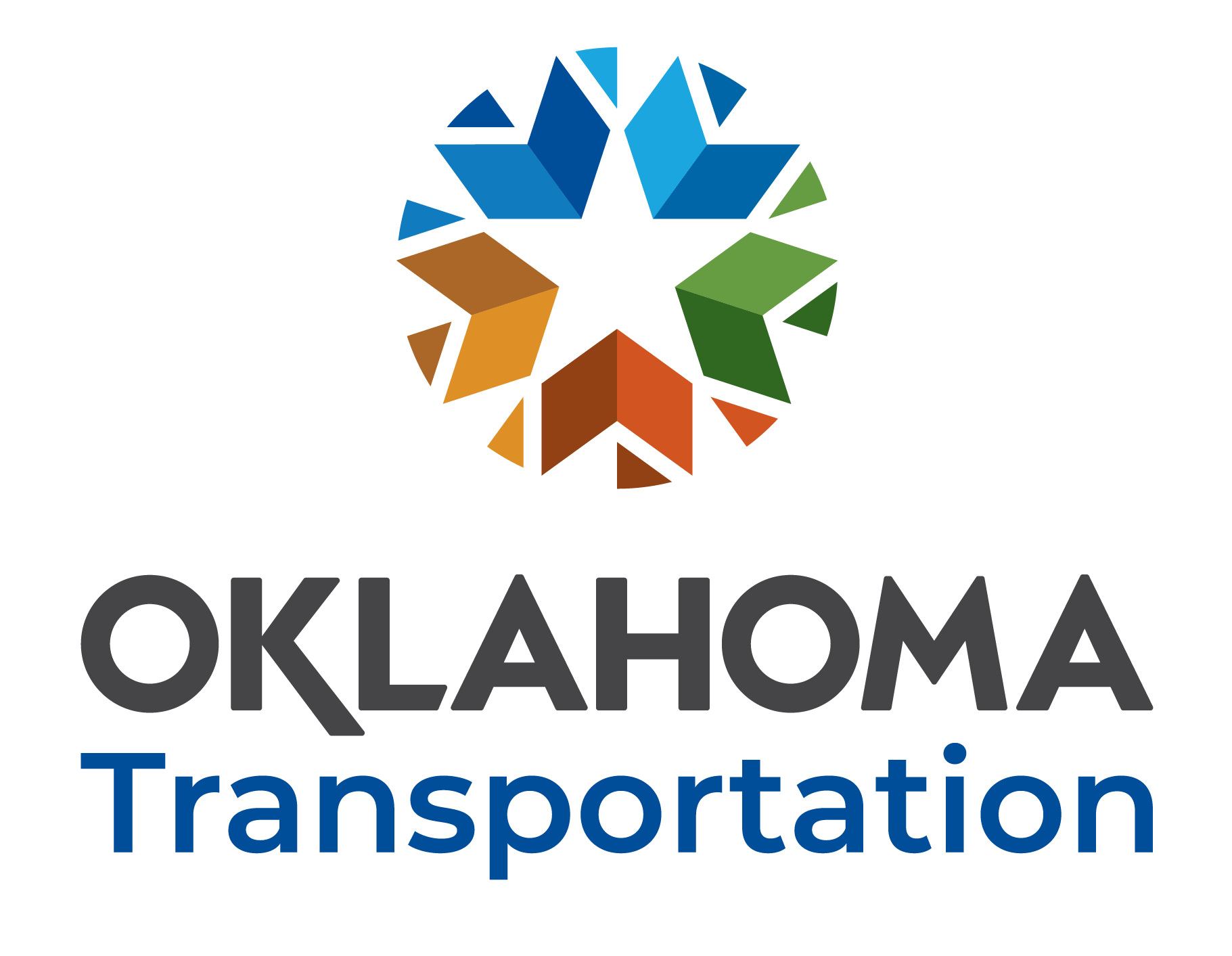
- Logo

Agency overview
- Formed: 1976
- Preceding agency: Oklahoma Department of Highways
- Headquarters: 200 NE 21st Street Oklahoma City, Oklahoma
- Employees: 2,383 (FY21)
- Annual budget: $1.7 billion (FY21)
- Minister responsible: Tim Gatz, Secretary of Transportation
- Agency executive: Tim Gatz, Executive Director
- Parent agency: Oklahoma Transportation Commission
- Website: Oklahoma Department of Transportation

The Oklahoma Department of Transportation (ODOT) is an agency of the government of Oklahoma responsible for the construction and maintenance of the state's transportation infrastructure. Under the leadership of the Oklahoma secretary of transportation and ODOT executive director, the department maintains public infrastructure that includes highways and state-owned railroads and administers programs for county roads, city streets, public transit, passenger rail, waterways and active transportation. Along with the Oklahoma Turnpike Authority, the department is the primary infrastructure construction and maintenance agency of the State.

ODOT is overseen by the Oklahoma Transportation Commission, composed of nine members appointed by the governor of Oklahoma, Oklahoma Senate and Oklahoma House of Representatives. Tim Gatz, a professional landscape architect with a bachelor's degree in landscape architecture, serves as the secretary of transportation and executive director of ODOT, as appointed by Governor Kevin Stitt in 2019. Gatz is also executive director of the Oklahoma Turnpike Authority. The department was created in 1976 during the term of Governor David L. Boren. It superseded the Department of Highways, which was established in 1911. The Department of Transportation's mission statement is "The mission of the Oklahoma Department of Transportation is to provide a safe, economical and effective transportation network for the people, commerce and communities of Oklahoma."

== History ==
The predecessor agency to ODOT was the Department of Highways, which began operations in 1911, four years after Oklahoma statehood. The Department of Highways, consisting of four employees, was given an initial budget of $3,700. The state's first 29 numbered highways were commissioned on August 29, 1924. As of May 1, 1926, the state highway system consisted of 3,682 miles (5,926 km) of graded dirt roads (72% of the system), 832 miles (1,339 km) of gravel roads (16%), and 634 miles (1,020 km) of paved roads, for a total system length of 5,148 miles (8,285 km). By March 1, 1930, the department name had been modified slightly to simply the Oklahoma Department of Highways.

In 1976, the Oklahoma Legislature restructured the Department of Highways as an overall coordinating agency for the state's highways, railways and waterways and renamed to the Oklahoma Department of Transportation.

== Overview ==
The Department of Transportation is primarily funded by motor vehicle fuel taxes, income taxes, legislative appropriations, and a return of federal matching dollars from the Federal Highway Trust Fund. ODOT's annual budget of both federal and state funds is applied to highway construction and maintenance activities, railways, waterways, rural public transit programs and administration statewide.

ODOT is responsible for construction of maintenance of 30,000 miles (48,000 km) of non-tolled highway lanes and nearly 6,800 bridges and administers state and federal funding used on city and county road and bridge projects. In 2019, ODOT assessed approximately 86 of its highway bridges as being structurally deficient. This is compared to 1,168 structurally deficient bridges in 2004.

The department maintains 139 miles (224 km) of state-owned railway, which are operated through leases with railroad companies, administers the Federal Highway Administration's Grade Crossing Safety Program which provides funding to make safety improvements to Oklahoma's nearly 3,800 at-grade public railway/road intersections, and manages the Amtrak Heartland Flyer passenger rail service in partnership with the Texas Department of Transportation.

ODOT is also responsible for administration of state and federal funding for public transit operators in areas with less than 50,000 in population and state safety oversight of fixed guideway rail transit systems, including the Oklahoma City Streetcar.

== Leadership ==
The agency is under the supervision of the Oklahoma secretary of transportation. under Governor of Oklahoma Kevin Stitt, Tim Gatz is serving as the Cabinet secretary.

The Oklahoma Transportation Commission is the governing body of the state transportation department. The governor of Oklahoma, the president pro tempore of the Oklahoma Senate, and the speaker of the Oklahoma House of Representatives appoint the members of the nine-member commission. It is the duty of the commission to establish agency policies, award contracts, approve budgets and conduct oversight. The members each represent one of the eight geographic districts corresponding with the agency's eight field divisions, with an additional at-large commissioner representing the entire state. The governor serves as an ex officio member of the commission, but may only vote to break a tie.

The current members of the Oklahoma Transportation Commission are as follows:

- Governor Kevin Stitt, ex officio
- At Large: Mr. V. Gene McKown, Chairman
- District 1: Mr. Bob Coburn
- District 2: Mr. James Grimsley
- District 3: Mr. T.W. Shannon, Secretary
- District 4: Mr. Don Freymiller
- District 5: Mr. David Dyson
- District 6: Mr. Bobby Alexander
- District 7: Mr. Stephen LaForge
- District 8: Mr. Bob Peterson, vice-chairman

== Organization ==
- Cabinet Secretary
- Transportation Commission
  - Executive Director
    - Chief Engineer
      - Director of Engineering
        - Right of Way and Utilities Division
        - Legal and Business Services Division
        - Bridge Division
        - Roadway Design Division
        - Traffic Engineering Division
        - Environmental Programs Division
        - Survey Division
      - Director of Operations
        - Maintenance Division
        - Construction Division
        - Materials Division
        - Office Engineer Division
        - Field Divisions
          - Division 1 - Muskogee
          - Division 2 - Antlers
          - Division 3 - Ada
          - Division 4 - Perry
          - Division 5 - Clinton
          - Division 6 - Buffalo
          - Division 7 - Duncan
          - Division 8 - Tulsa
    - Deputy Director
      - Legislation and Policy
      - Director of Capital Programs
        - Strategic Asset and Performance Management Division
        - Rail Programs Division
        - Local Government Division
        - Project Management Division
        - Tribal Liaison
        - Facilities Management Division
        - Office of Research and Implementation
        - Waterways Program
      - Director of Finance and Administration
        - Office Services Division
        - Office of Mobility and Public Transit
        - Media and Public Relations Division
        - Comptroller Division
        - Human Resources Division
        - Procurement Division
    - General Counsel
    - Operations Review and Evaluation Division
    - Civil Rights Division

== Field divisions ==
Map of ODOT field divisions

| Division | Counties | Headquarters |
|---|---|---|
| 1 | Adair, Cherokee, Haskell, McIntosh, Muskgoee, Okmulgee, Sequoyah, Wagoner | Muskogee |
| 2 | Atoka, Bryan, Choctaw, Latimer, Le Flore, McCurtain, Marshall, Pittsburg, Pushmataha | Antlers |
| 3 | Cleveland, Coal, Garvin, Hughes, Johnston, Lincoln, McClain, Okfuskee, Pontotoc, Pottawatomie, Seminole | Ada |
| 4 | Canadian, Garfield, Grant, Kay, Kingfisher, Logan, Noble, Oklahoma, Payne | Perry |
| 5 | Beckham, Blaine, Custer, Dewey, Greer, Harmon, Jackson, Kiowa, Roger Mills, Tillman, Washita | Clinton |
| 6 | Alfalfa, Beaver, Cimarron, Ellis, Harper, Major, Texas, Woods, Woodward | Buffalo |
| 7 | Caddo, Carter, Comanche, Cotton, Grady, Jefferson, Love, Murray, Stephens | Duncan |
| 8 | Craig, Creek, Delaware, Mayes, Nowata, Osage, Ottawa, Pawnee, Rogers, Tulsa, Washington | Tulsa |

== Management and finance ==
=== Staffing ===
The Transportation Department, with an annual budget of $1.7 billion, is one of the largest employers of Oklahoma state government. For fiscal year 2021, the department was authorized 2,395 full-time employees.

| Program area | Number of employees |
|---|---|
| Administration | |
| Transit programs | |
| Railroad programs | |
| Waterways programs | |
| Operations | |
| Engineering programs | |
| Total | |

=== Budget ===
The Department of Transportation receives appropriations from the Oklahoma Legislature and direct streams of revenue authorized by State law. The primary revenue sources for the department are the state's excise tax on gasoline and diesel motor fuels and the state income tax. The agency also receives Grants through the Federal-aid Highway Program of the Federal Highway Administration.

The department's annual budget is primarily divided between two major areas: Operations and Capital Programs.

For fiscal year 2021, the Department of Transportation had the following budget by division areas:

| Division area | Budget |
|---|---|
| Transit | $71.5 million |
| Railroads | $14.8 million |
| Highways | $1.5 billion |
| County roads | $158 million |
| Total | $1.7 billion |

For fiscal year 2021, the Department of Transportation had the following budget by program area:

| Program area | Budget |
|---|---|
| Transit operations | $1.5 million |
| Railroads operations | $1.2 million |
| Waterways operations | $196,000 |
| Highway operations | $368 million |
| Information technology | $34 million |
| Capital outlay | $1.5 billion |
| County projects | $217 million |
| Transit projects | $37 million |
| Rail projects | $19 million |
| Total | $1.7 billion |

== Supporting agencies ==
- Highway Construction Materials Technician Certification Board
- Tribal Advisory Board
- Waterways Advisory Board
- County Advisory Board
