= Oklahoma Department of Aerospace and Aeronautics =

- Great Seal of the State of Oklahoma

Agency overview
- Formed: 1963 (as Oklahoma Aeronautics Commission)
- Headquarters: 110 N. Robinson, Ste. 200Oklahoma City, Oklahoma
- Employees: 10 (FY17)
- Annual budget: $26.6 million (FY26)
- Agency executive: Grayson Ardies, Director
- Website: Oklahoma Aeronautics Commission

The Oklahoma Department of Aerospace and Aeronautics (ODAA) is an agency of Oklahoma state government that is responsible for promoting aviation in the state, fostering the growth of the aerospace industry, and ensuring that the needs of business and communities in the state are met by the state's airports. ODAA also encourages the establishment and maintenance of public airports, including the preservation and improvement of the state's 110 public airports.

ODAA is overseen by the Oklahoma Aerospace and Aeronautics Commission, which is composed of nine members. Seven members are appointed by the Governor of Oklahoma, one of which is appointed by the President Pro Tempore of the Oklahoma State Senate, and one of which is appointed by the Speaker of the Oklahoma House of Representatives, serving six-year terms. Five members are appointed from among Oklahoma's five congressional districts with the remaining four appointed at-large. The commission is responsible for appointing the Director of ODAA to serve at its pleasure. The current director is Grayson Ardies.

ODAA was originally established in 1963 during the term of Governor Henry Bellmon as the Oklahoma Aeronautics Commission. Its name was changed in 2023 to the Oklahoma Department of Aerospace and Aeronautics, when it was made a separate state entity from the Oklahoma Department of Transportation.

== History ==
The department was created in 2023 by the Oklahoma Legislature as a successor to the Oklahoma Aeronautics Commission originally established in 1963. Prior to that, aerospace in Oklahoma was overseen by the Oklahoma Aviation Commission.

In 2025, the department's roles were expanded as the Oklahoma Aerospace and Aeronautics Commission was designated as the Board of Directors of the Oklahoma Space Industry Development Authority, and all employees of OSIDA were transferred to the department.

== Leadership ==
As of July 1, 2025, the members of the commission are as follows:

- Chairman Blake Raney - District 5
- Vice Chair Kevin Potter - District 2
- Secretary Seth Philipps - District 1
- Charles Ortega - District 3
- Lindy Ritz - District 4
- Jim Putnam - At-Large
- Jerry Hunter - At-Large
- Vacant - President Pro Tempore Appointee
- Vacant - Speaker Appointee

== Budget ==
The Oklahoma Department of Aerospace and Aeronautics is an appropriated state agency. In the FY2026 Oklahoma State budget, the department received 26.6 million dollars from the State to support its functions.

== See also ==
- Federal Aviation Administration
