= Oklahoma Turnpike Authority =

State government agency in the US

- Oklahoma Turnpike Authority logo

Agency overview
- Formed: 1947
- Headquarters: 3500 Martin Luther King Ave. Oklahoma City, Oklahoma
- Website: www.pikepass.com

The Oklahoma Turnpike Authority (OTA) is a public agency responsible for the development, operation, and maintenance of Oklahoma's turnpike system. Originally established by statute in 1947, the Authority is an instrumentality of the State of Oklahoma and a body corporate and politic. OTA is authorized to plan, finance, construct, maintain, and operate toll roads at locations approved by the Oklahoma Legislature. OTA funds its operations through toll revenues rather than state tax appropriations. It issues revenue bonds to finance turnpike projects, with bond repayment secured by toll revenues and other Authority income rather than by the general obligation of the State of Oklahoma. Current operational updates, board membership, project information, and financial disclosures are maintained on OTA's official website.

== History ==
=== Early turnpike efforts in Oklahoma (1941–1947) ===
Oklahoma's first attempt to authorize a toll road occurred in 1941, when legislators introduced a proposal to construct a toll road between Oklahoma City and Tulsa; the measure advanced out of committee but failed to pass the Senate. Post-World War II population growth and increased vehicle use revived the concept later in the decade, as leaders concluded that a four-lane divided highway between the two cities was necessary but could not be funded through the state highway program alone.

=== Creation of the Oklahoma Turnpike Authority and the Turner Turnpike ===
In 1947, the Oklahoma Legislature passed enabling legislation creating the Oklahoma Turnpike Authority and authorizing construction of what became the Turner Turnpike, connecting Oklahoma City and Tulsa. The legislation allowed the Authority to issue revenue bonds backed by toll collections rather than use state taxes.

The Turner Turnpike opened to traffic in 1953. Its operational and financial viability drew national attention and demonstrated the feasibility of the toll-financed model in Oklahoma.

=== Expansion and Statewide Referendum (1953–1954) ===
Based on the operational experience of the Turner Turnpike, the Legislature amended the original enabling law to create a statewide turnpike authority and authorize additional routes, including what later became the Will Rogers, H.E. Bailey, and other turnpikes.

In January 1954, Oklahoma voters approved the expanded authority and additional turnpikes by a margin of about 40,000 votes. The original 1947 legislation had contemplated that the Turner Turnpike might eventually be transferred to the state highway system once its bonds were retired; the 1954 vote established a different model — a statewide, self-sustaining turnpike authority with cross-pledged revenues — and that framework has governed the system since.

== Mission and Role ==
The mission of the Oklahoma Turnpike Authority is to provide a safe, reliable, and efficient turnpike system that supports transportation infrastructure across the state.

OTA's role differs from tax-funded highway agencies. Rather than relying on fuel taxes or general appropriations, the Authority operates through user fees (tolls) dedicated to the operation, maintenance, debt service on revenue bonds, and preserving the long-term viability of the turnpike system.

== Governance and Leadership ==
The Oklahoma Turnpike Authority is governed by a seven-member board. The Governor of Oklahoma serves as an ex-officio member, and the remaining members are appointed in accordance with state statute. Board members serve staggered terms and provide policy oversight.

The Board appoints an Executive Director, who manages day-to-day operations and oversees professional staff responsible for engineering, construction, toll operations, maintenance, finance, and administrative functions. Current board and leadership information is available on the Authority's official website.

== Toll Collection Systems ==
=== Pikepass ===
Pikepass is OTA's electronic toll collection system. Introduced in the early 1990s, it was one of the first cashless tolling programs in the nation. Transponder-based, it allows drivers to pay tolls more economically through a prepaid account. The Pikepass discounted toll rates are interoperable with several tolling authorities in the region and around the U.S.

=== PlatePay ===
PlatePay is a cashless toll payment option for drivers without a PIKEPASS account. Tolls are assessed using license-plate recognition and billed to the registered vehicle owner.

== Financing and Revenue Bonds ==
The Oklahoma Turnpike Authority finances construction and major capital improvements through the issuance of Turnpike Revenue Bonds. These bonds are payable solely from toll revenues and other Authority income and do not constitute indebtedness of the State of Oklahoma. Bond covenants and trust agreements govern the collection and use of revenues, including legal requirements for operations, maintenance, and debt service. Under a cross-pledging structure authorized by the Legislature in 1965, revenues from all turnpikes are pooled into a single trust, meaning tolls remain in place system-wide as long as any bonds in the system are outstanding. According to the Authority's 2025 OTA Outlook, approximately 50 percent of toll revenue is generated by out-of-state motorists.

== Oversight, Reviews, and Public Scrutiny ==
OTA operates under legislative authorization and is subject to state oversight, financial audits, and statutory requirements. In response to public scrutiny related to tolling, governance, and infrastructure planning, the Oklahoma Legislature authorized an independent review by the Legislative Office of Fiscal Transparency (LOFT). The resulting report examined OTA's governance, ethics, and financial practices and concluded that the Authority operates within its statutory authority.

LOFT also found that eliminating or substantially restructuring the toll-funded system would require the state to assume significant maintenance and capital obligations, which would add to the estimated $33 billion maintenance backlog within the Oklahoma Department of Transportation.

== Turnpike System ==
The Oklahoma Turnpike Authority operates a statewide network of toll roads connecting major metropolitan areas, regional hubs, and interstate corridors. The system supports long-distance travel, freight movement, and regional connectivity. Current system maps, turnpike listings, and traffic information are maintained on the Authority's official website.

== See also ==
- Turnpikes of Oklahoma
