= Oklahoma State Highway 1 =

Highway in Oklahoma

State Highway 1

Route information
- Maintained by ODOT
- Length: 209.7 mi (337.5 km)
- Existed: 1968–present

Major junctions
- West end: US 177 / SH-199 east of Mannsville
- Chickasaw Turnpike near Roff; US 377 / SH-99 in Ada; US 75 in Calvin; Indian Nation Turnpike near McAlester; US 69 in McAlester; US 271 in Talihina; US 259 near Big Cedar
- East end: AR 88 at the Arkansas state line

Location
- Country: United States
- State: Oklahoma

Highway system
- Oklahoma State Highway System; Interstate; US; State; Turnpikes
← I-444	→ SH-2

State Highway 1, sometimes abbreviated as SH-1, is a 209.7-mile (337 km) highway maintained by the U.S. state of Oklahoma. It travels through the southeastern part of the state, nicknamed Little Dixie. SH-1 is signed east and west.

== Route description ==
=== Madill to Ada ===
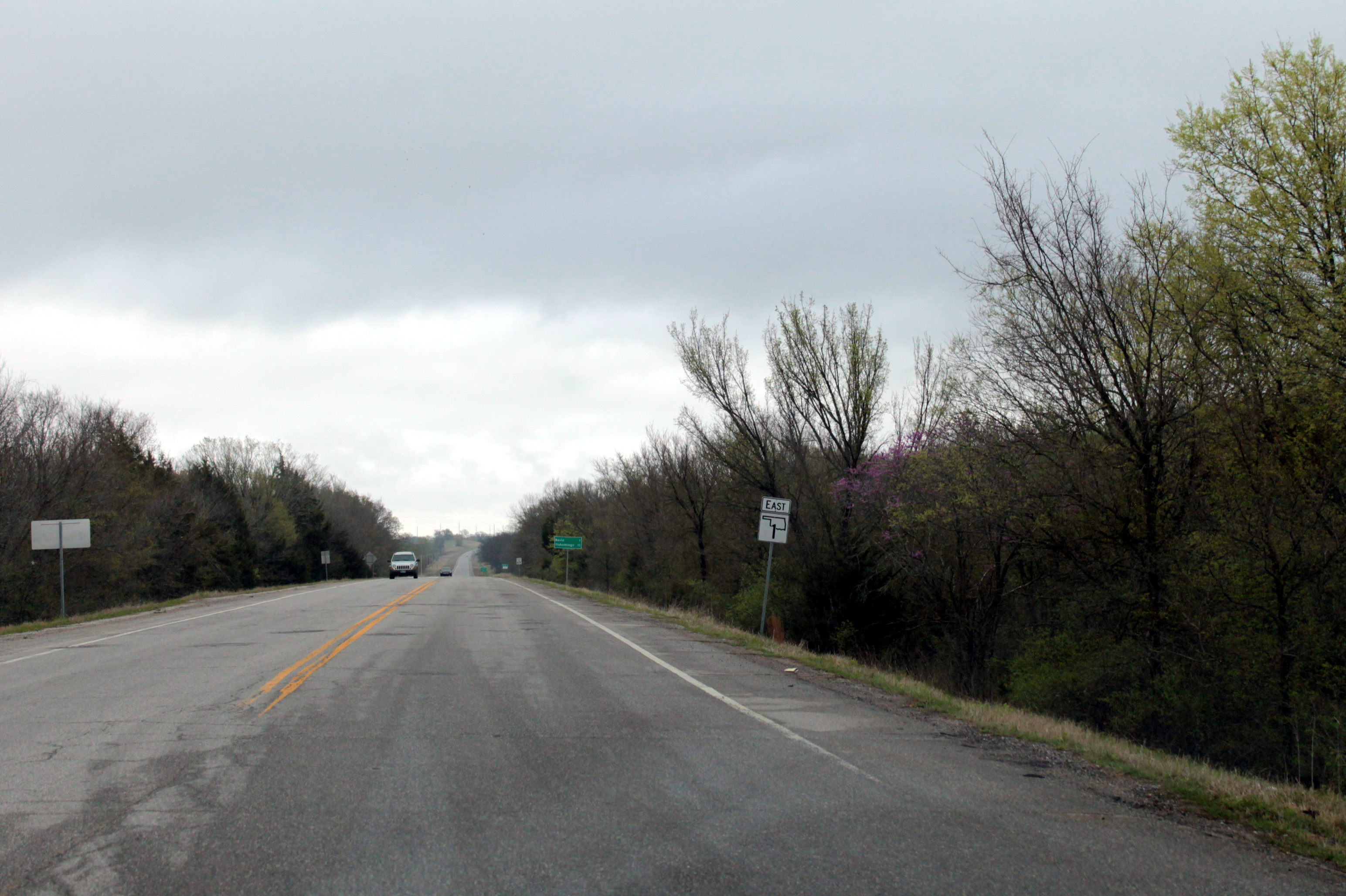
The beginning of SH-1, just north of the junction with US-177/SH-199

SH-1 eastbound begins at US-177/SH-199 between Mannsville and Madill. It then winds northward to the town of Ravia, and becomes concurrent with SH-7 at through Mill Creek. Highway 7 splits off to the west soon after and SH-1 continues northward to Hickory, Oklahoma and Roff.

In Fitzhugh SH-1 becomes a multilane highway. It then becomes a freeway serving as part of a beltway around Ada. Through Ada it is briefly concurrent with US-377/SH-99.

=== Ada to Calvin ===
After leaving Ada the highway becomes gradually more hilly and curvy, and turns northeast. Between the towns of Allen and Calvin, the road roughly follows the south bank of the Canadian River, though the river is not actually visible from the road.

At Calvin, the road becomes concurrent with US-270 and intersects with US-75.

=== Calvin to Talihina ===
Through some parts of this section of the highway, the SH-1 signage is omitted in favor of US-270 signs.

Continuing east, the highway passes just north of Stuart, Oklahoma and through Arpelar. It then intersects with the Indian Nation Turnpike just west of the McAlester city limits. Through McAlester the street is also signed as Carl Albert Parkway.

East of McAlester the road continues as a four-lane road (much of it divided) connecting many small towns east of the city: Krebs, Alderson, Bache, Dow, Haileyville, and Hartshorne.

West of Hartshorne US-270 splits off from SH-1 and it continues east concurrent with SH-63. For 6 miles (9.7 km) SH-1 and SH-63 overlap State Highway 2. Here the road continues east and becomes even more hilly and curvy as it heads toward the Winding Stair Mountains. From this point forward, the road contains a large number of hairpin turns – some even as drastic as 180-degrees. At Talihina SH-63 splits off to the south and US-271 merges on to the highway for 8 miles (13 km).

=== The Talimena Drive ===
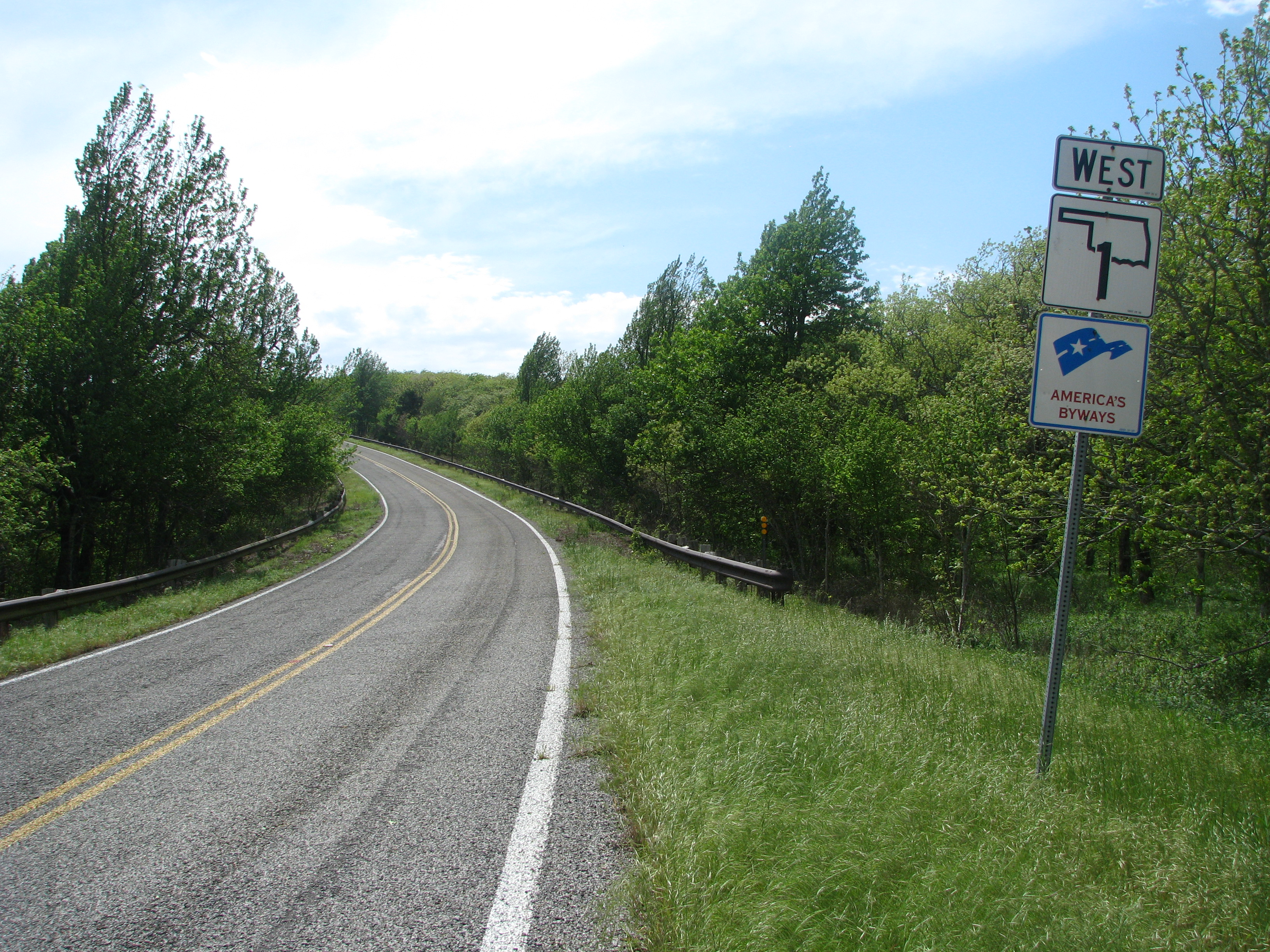
Oklahoma Highway 1 just west of the Arkansas State Line in Le Flore County.

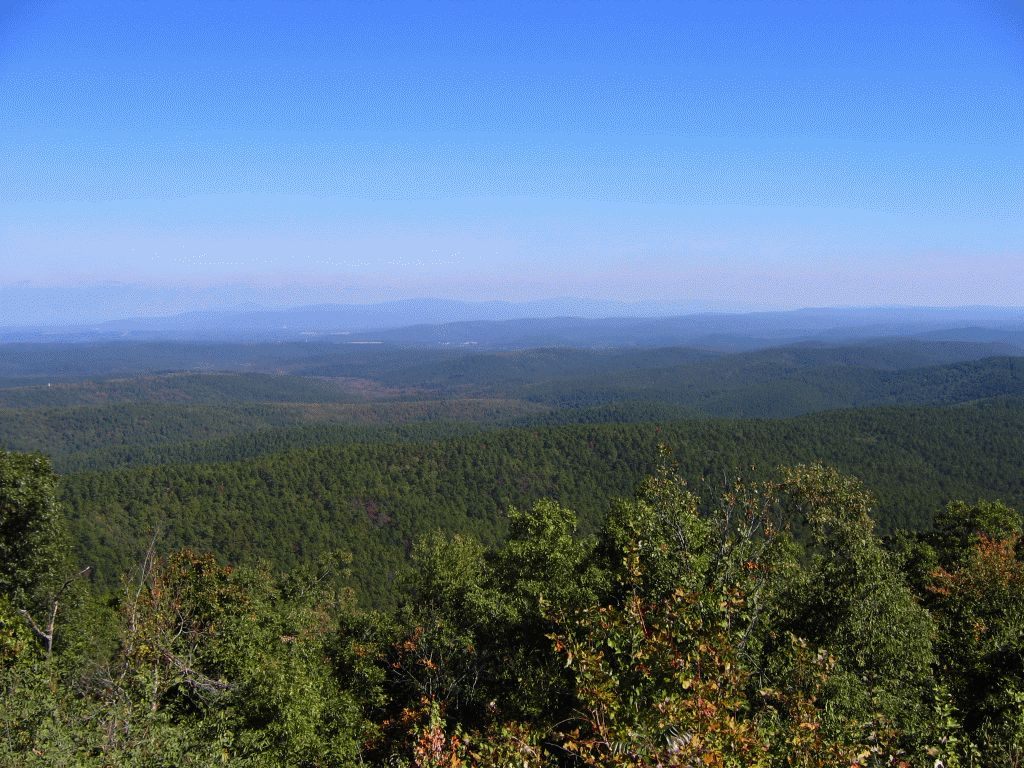
A view from Talimena Drive. The photograph was taken in late October.

Eight miles (12.8 km) northeast of Talihina, SH-1 splits off of US-271. This begins the final 26 miles (41 km) of the highway, officially named the Talimena Drive because it runs from Talihina to Mena, Arkansas. This highway, a National Scenic Byway since January 2005, runs through the Ouachita National Forest and the Winding Stair Mountains, and has no shoulders. It features special 'vistas' – parking lots placed off the road at especially scenic parts of the highway. At either end of the Talimena Drive, signs are posted stating that the highway is closed during cold and foggy conditions, and that no snow control is provided.

The height of the mountain peaks on the Drive causes the oaks and pines to grow so much slower and shorter than the rest of Southeast Oklahoma. On a hot summer day, the winds on the Talimena Drive may be a good 10 degrees cooler than other nearby locations.

SH-1 ends at the Arkansas state line. The roadbed continues on as Highway 88, toward Queen Wilhelmina State Park and the city of Mena, Arkansas.

== History ==
State Highway 1 was historically an entrance into Indian Territory from the state of Arkansas. The Oklahoma Choctaw came to these mountain tops in the early 1830s. Stage coach robbers, train robbers and bank robbers all came to hide on these mountain peaks bringing in their horses for much needed breaks. Horse Thief Springs is marked at its vista where one can still rest before continuing down the Drive.

SH-1 is the latest of many Oklahoma state highways assigned the number 1. The current route opened in 1969. In this case, the number 1 was assigned due to the scenery along the highway.

== Junction list ==
County	Location	mi	km	Destinations	Notes
Marshall		0.0	0.0	US 177 / SH-199	Western terminus
Johnston	Ravia	8.0	12.9	SH-22	Western terminus of SH-22
Johnston		17.2	27.7	SH-7	Southern end of SH-7 concurrency
Murray		28.2	45.4	SH-7	Northern end of SH-7 concurrency
Pontotoc		40.5	65.2	Chickasaw Turnpike	Eastern terminus of Chickasaw Turnpike
Pontotoc	Ada	50.2	80.8	SH-3	Interchange, southern end of SH-3 concurrency
Pontotoc	Ada	50.7	81.6	Reeves Road	Westbound exit only
Pontotoc	Ada	51.4	82.7	SH-3W / SH-19	Interchange, SH-3 splits into SH-3W and SH-3E, eastern terminus of SH-19
Pontotoc	Ada	52.2	84.0	US 377 / SH-3E / SH-99	Interchange, western end of US-377/SH-99 concurrency
Pontotoc	Ada	55.7	89.6	US 377 / SH-99	Eastern end of US-377/SH-99 concurrency
Pontotoc	Allen	73.4	118.1	SH-48	Western end of SH-48 concurrency
Hughes	Atwood	80.5	129.6	SH-48	Eastern end of SH-48 concurrency
Hughes	Calvin	86.1	138.6	US 75 / US 270	Western end of US-270 concurrency
Hughes		95.9	154.3	SH-31A	Northern terminus of SH-31A
Pittsburg		111.4	179.3	Indian Nation Turnpike	Interchange
Pittsburg	McAlester	115.1	185.2	SH-31	Western end of SH-31 concurrency
Pittsburg	McAlester	115.8	186.4	US 69 Bus.	
Pittsburg	McAlester	117.5	189.1	US 69	Interchange
Pittsburg	McAlester	117.8	189.6	SH-31	Eastern end of SH-31 concurrency
Pittsburg	Haileyville	128.8	207.3	SH-63	Western end of SH-63 concurrency
Pittsburg	Hartshorne	131.5	211.6	US 270	Eastern end of US-270 concurrency
Latimer		146.8	236.3	SH-2	Northern end of SH-2 concurrency
Latimer		152.8	245.9	SH-2	Southern end of SH-2 concurrency
Latimer		164.8	265.2	SH-63A	Southern terminus of SH-63A
Le Flore	Talihina	166.1	267.3	SH-82	Southern terminus of SH-82
Le Flore	Talihina	166.6	268.1	US 271 / SH-63	Eastern end of SH-63 concurrency, western end of US-271 concurrency
Le Flore		174.7	281.2	US 271	Talimena Drive begins, eastern end of US-271 concurrency
Le Flore		195.0	313.8	US 259	
Oklahoma–Arkansas state line		209.7	337.5	AR 88 continues into Arkansas	
1.000 mi = 1.609 km; 1.000 km = 0.621 mi: Concurrency terminus; Incomplete access; Tolled
