= Big Canyon, Oklahoma =

- Ghost town
- Location within Oklahoma Location within the United States
- Coordinates: 34°21′44.2″N 97°1′38.98″W
- Country: United States
- State: Oklahoma
- County: Murray
- Time zone: UTC-6 (Central (CST))
  - Summer (DST): UTC-5 (CDT)

Big Canyon was a town in Murray County, Oklahoma, United States. It's located 5 miles (8.0 km) southeast of Dougherty, Oklahoma, along the East bank of the Washita River. The town was located on a quarry owned by the Dolese Brothers. A cemetery called the “Big Canyon Cemetery” is located close to the original location of Big Canyon. If an employee died, the company buried them in the Big Canyon Cemetery. It is disputed if the town had other names (Crusher and Arbuckle).

== History ==
Big Canyon was founded to furnish crushed limestone for forming parts of the bed of the Santa Fe Railroad. When the railroad came through in 1886, road building materials were badly needed to put the railroad up to grade going through the rugged Arbuckle Mountains. The quarry was created to supply rock for the railroad expanding across the country. Mining began in the same year, ran by the Dolese Brothers, who employed a significant labor force in the state. Many of the houses in Big Canyon were the houses of the Santa Fe employees. There was also a dormitory for the single men. The town contained eight houses. Big Canyon's post office was founded in 1904. Their post office was ended in 1961, and all of the buildings were relocated. The quarry was finally shut down in 1993.
