= Halstead High School =

Location
- 520 West 6th Street; Halstead, Kansas 67056; United States; 37.998481°N 97.512613°W

Information
- School type: Public, high school
- School district: Halstead–Bentley USD 440
- Superintendent: Ron Barry
- CEEB code: 171215
- Principal: Joe Gerber
- Teaching staff: 19.45 (FTE)
- Grades: 7 to 12
- Gender: coed
- Enrollment: 243 (2023–2024)
- Student to teacher ratio: 12.49
- Campus type: Rural
- Colors: Royal blue White; Black
- Athletics: Class 3A; District 10
- Athletics conference: Central Kansas League
- Mascot: Dragon
- Yearbook: The Dragon Yearbook
- Communities served: Halstead, Bentley
- Website: School website

Halstead High School is a public high school located in Halstead, Kansas, United States, serving students in grades 7-12. It is operated by Halstead–Bentley USD 440 school district. The school primarily serves the towns of Halstead and Bentley, Kansas. The school colors are royal blue and white with black commonly used as a complementary color.

== Extracurricular activities ==
=== Athletics ===
Halstead High School athletic teams compete as a 3A school under the Kansas State High School Activities Association. They are a part of the CKL League (Central Kansas League), which is made up of Halstead, Haven, Hesston, Hillsboro, Hoisington, Larned, Lyons, Nickerson, Pratt, and Smoky Valley. Athletic programs are offered in baseball, men's and women's basketball, cross-country, football, golf, softball, track and field, wrestling, and volleyball. Halstead has hosted annual athletic events including the Halstead Wrestling Invitational since 1975, the Adolph Rupp Basketball Tournament since 1970 and the Conrad Nightingale Invitational Track Meet since 1971. Halstead won the 3A state championship in boys' basketball in 2001 and 2018, boys' golf in 1981 and boys' cross country in 2014, 2015 and 2017.

=== State championships ===
State Championships
Season	Sport	Number of Championships	Year
Fall	Cross country, boys'	3	2014, 2015, 2017
Fall	Volleyball	1	2024
Winter	Basketball, boys'	8	1908, 1909, 1942, 1944, 1945, 1952, 2001, 2018
Spring	Debate	5	1944, 1945, 1946, 1947, 2003
Spring	Golf, Boys'	1	1981
Spring	Track & field, girls'	3	1977, 1981, 1998
Spring	Track & field, boys'	2	1956, 1986
Total		23	

==== Clubs ====
The Halstead Debate team achieved a state championship in 2003. Artistic programs are offered in band, choir, and drama. Debate and forensics teams are offered, as well as a Scholar's Bowl team.

== Notable alumni ==
- Bobby Berger, bull rider
- Dennis Latimore, played college basketball at University of Arizona and the University of Notre Dame
- Conrad Nightingale, competed in the 1968 Summer Olympics
- Jim Roper, winner of the first NASCAR race
- Adolph Rupp, Hall of Fame basketball coach at the University of Kentucky

== See also ==
- Kansas State Department of Education
- Kansas State High School Activities Association
- List of high schools in Kansas
- List of unified school districts in Kansas
