= Conrad Nightingale =

American steeplechase runner

Conrad Keith Nightingale (born September 24, 1945, in Colorado Springs, Colorado) is an American steeplechase runner who competed in the 1968 Summer Olympics.

== Early life ==
Nightingale grew up in Halstead, Kansas and attended Halstead High School. Following graduation, Nightingale competed for the Kansas State Wildcats track and field team and won the 1966 mile run at the NCAA Division I Indoor Track and Field Championships in a time of 4:03.4.

== Legacy ==
Halstead High School hosts an annual track and field meet known as the 'Conrad Nightingale Invitational'.
