= Oak Grove, Murray County, Oklahoma =

Oak Grove, Oklahoma
- Unincorporated community
- Location within Oklahoma Location within the United States
- Coordinates: 34°36′53″N 96°58′01″W
- Country: United States
- State: Oklahoma
- County: Murray
- Elevation: 352 m (1,155 ft)
- GNIS feature ID: 1096088

Oak Grove is an unincorporated community in Murray County, Oklahoma, United States, located on U.S. Highway 177. It is 6.5 miles north of Sulphur, 11.5 miles south of Stratford and six miles west of Roff.
