= The Adventures of Smilin' Jack (serial) =

1943 film by Ray Taylor, Lewis D. Collins

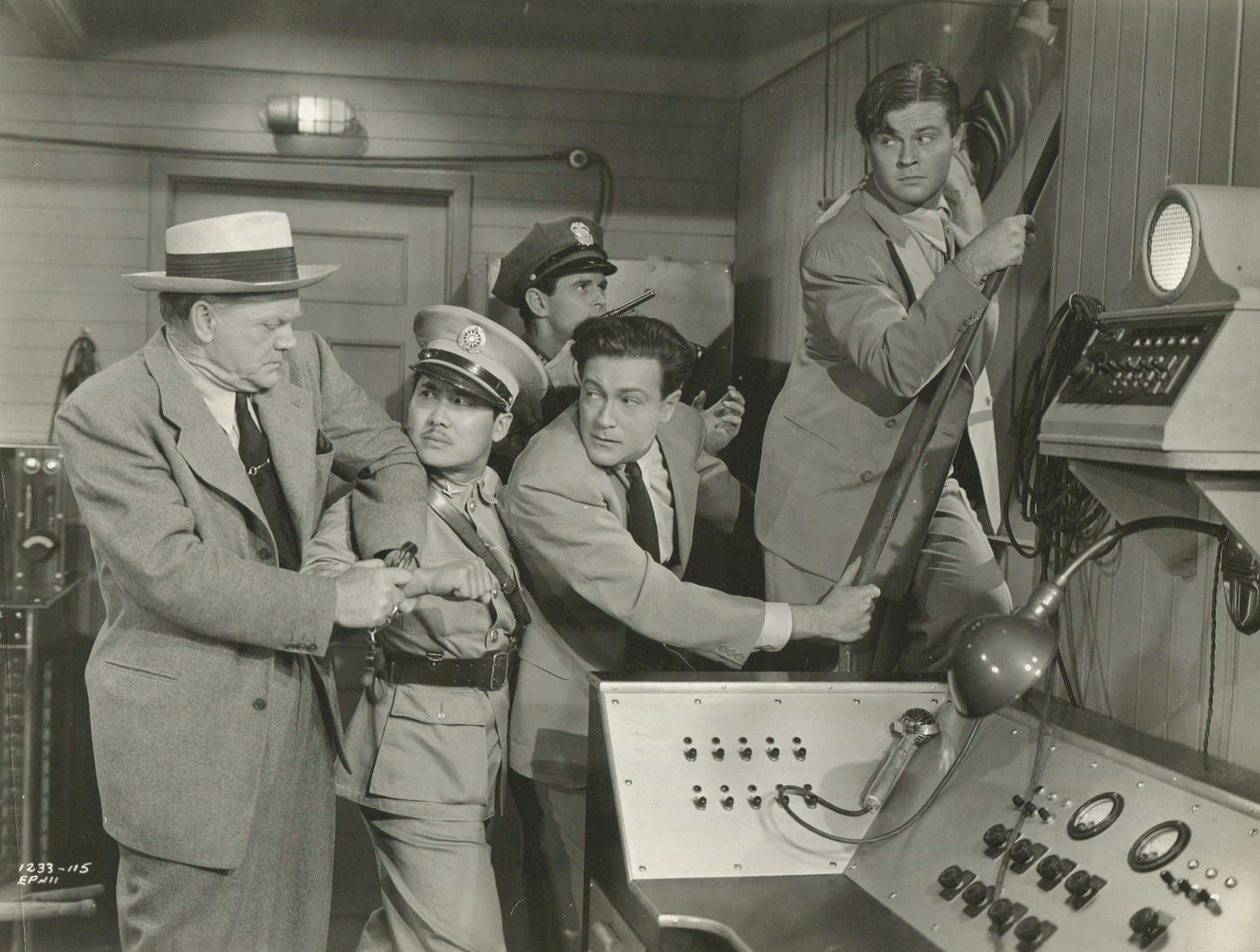
- Directed by: Lewis D. Collins; Ray Taylor
- Distributed by: Universal Pictures
- Release date: 1943
- Running time: 13 chapters (265 min)
- Country: United States
- Language: English

The Adventures of Smilin' Jack (1943) is a Universal movie serial based on the popular comic strip The Adventures of Smilin' Jack by Zack Mosley. It was directed by Lewis D. Collins and Ray Taylor.

== Plot ==
In 1941, an American aviator, 'Smilin' Jack' Martin wishes to resign as an advisor to the Nationalist Chinese Army in order to return to the United States to enlist as an aviator in America's military buildup prior to the attack on Pearl Harbor. He is delayed when the Chinese discover that the neutral Tibetan like Mandon "Province" contains a secret road from India to China crucial for the Allied war effort. Determined to obtain the secret for themselves, or equally determined to have the secret destroyed is the Japanese espionage organisation "The Black Samurai" and the German intelligence agent Fräulein von Teufel who masquerades as an American newspaper reporter.

== Cast ==
- Tom Brown as 'Smilin' Jack' Martin
- Rose Hobart as Fräulein von Teufel
- Edgar Barrier as Tommy Thompson
- Marjorie Lord as Janet Thompson
- Keye Luke as Capt. Wing
- Sidney Toler as Gen. Kai Ling
- Cyril Delevanti as Mah Ling/Han Po (his doppelganger)
- Philip Ahn as Wu Tan
- Nigel De Brulier as The Lo-San
- Turhan Bey as Kageyama
- David Hoffman as John (Johann) O. Blenker, a Nazi spy
- Rico De Montezas as Hito, Japanese hitman
- Jay Novello as Kushimi

== Production ==
The serial was based on the comic strip by Zack Moseley but it was not in the spirit of the strip as would normally be expected from a Universal production. Very little of the original comic strip was used and a new character, Tommy Thompson, was created by Universal. The similarity to Tommy Tomkins, of the Tailspin Tommy stories, may imply a crossover of sorts. Cline suggests that it was "a quick attempt to get a story on screen about a topical subject, and could have had almost any flyer with any name as a hero.”

== Chapter titles ==
1. The High Road to Doom
2. The Rising Sun Strikes
3. Attacked by Bombers
4. Knives of Vengeance
5. A Watery Grave
6. Escape by Clipper
7. Fifteen Fathoms Below
8. Treachery at Sea
9. The Bridge of Peril
10. Blackout in the Islands
11. Held for Treason
12. The Torture Fire Test
13. Sinking the Rising Sun

_{Source:}

== Quotes ==
United Nations means united friends-Capt. Wing

Preceded by Overland Mail (1942)	Universal Serial; The Adventures of Smilin' Jack (1943)	Succeeded by Don Winslow of the Coast Guard (1943)
