= Hickory, Oklahoma =

- Town
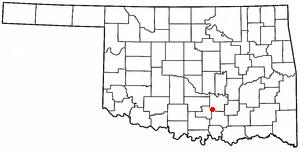
- Location in Oklahoma
- Coordinates: 34°33′25″N 96°51′30″W
- Country: United States
- State: Oklahoma
- County: Murray

Area
  - Total: 0.53 sq mi (1.37 km^{2})
  - Land: 0.53 sq mi (1.37 km^{2})
  - Water: 0 sq mi (0.00 km^{2})
- Elevation: 1,217 ft (371 m)

Population (2020)
  - Total: 86
  - Density: 163.1/sq mi (62.96/km^{2})
- Time zone: UTC-6 (Central (CST))
  - Summer (DST): UTC-5 (CDT)
- ZIP Code: 74865
- FIPS code: 40-34150
- GNIS feature ID: 2412748

Hickory is a town in Murray County, Oklahoma, United States. The population was 86 as of the 2020 census.

The locale is old enough to appear on a 1911 Rand McNally map of the county.

Hickory was the birthplace and childhood home of Zack Mosley, the creator of the comic strip The Adventures of Smilin' Jack, an adventurous aviator, inspired by Mosley witnessing an early plane crash in Hickory.

== Geography ==
Hickory is located in northeastern Murray County at 34°33′34″N 96°51′25″W (34.559558, -96.856941). It is about 9 miles (14 km) by road northeast of Sulphur, the county seat. Roff, with which Hickory shares a ZIP Code, is 6 miles (10 km) to the north in Pontotoc County.

According to the U.S. Census Bureau, the town of Hickory has a total area of 0.53 square miles (1.37 km^{2}), of which 0.002 square miles (0.005 km^{2}), or 0.38%, are water. The town is drained by tributaries of Mill Creek, which passes just west of the town border. Mill Creek is a south-flowing tributary of the Washita River.

== Demographics ==
Historical population
Census	Pop.	Note	%±
1900	262		—
1910	350		33.6%
1920	359		2.6%
1930	157		−56.3%
1940	224		42.7%
1950	112		−50.0%
1960	112		0.0%
1970	62		−44.6%
1980	95		53.2%
1990	77		−18.9%
2000	87		13.0%
2010	71		−18.4%
2020	86		21.1%
U.S. Decennial Census

=== 2020 census ===
As of the 2020 census, Hickory had a population of 86. The median age was 29.0 years. 31.4% of residents were under the age of 18 and 11.6% of residents were 65 years of age or older. For every 100 females there were 100.0 males, and for every 100 females age 18 and over there were 90.3 males age 18 and over.

0.0% of residents lived in urban areas, while 100.0% lived in rural areas.

There were 28 households in Hickory, of which 35.7% had children under the age of 18 living in them. Of all households, 60.7% were married-couple households, 10.7% were households with a male householder and no spouse or partner present, and 21.4% were households with a female householder and no spouse or partner present. About 10.7% of all households were made up of individuals and 0.0% had someone living alone who was 65 years of age or older.

There were 33 housing units, of which 15.2% were vacant. The homeowner vacancy rate was 8.3% and the rental vacancy rate was 0.0%.

Racial composition as of the 2020 census
Race	Number	Percent
White	62	72.1%
Black or African American	0	0.0%
American Indian and Alaska Native	12	14.0%
Asian	0	0.0%
Native Hawaiian and Other Pacific Islander	1	1.2%
Some other race	0	0.0%
Two or more races	11	12.8%
Hispanic or Latino (of any race)	6	7.0%

=== 2000 census ===
As of the 2000 census, there were 87 people, 32 households, and 24 families residing in the town. The population density was 157.7 inhabitants per square mile (60.9/km^{2}). There were 40 housing units at an average density of 72.5 per square mile (28.0/km^{2}). The racial makeup of the town was 71.26% White, 12.64% Native American, 1.15% Asian, 9.20% from other races, and 5.75% from two or more races. Hispanic or Latino of any race were 16.09% of the population.

There were 32 households, out of which 34.4% had children under the age of 18 living with them, 68.8% were married couples living together, and 25.0% were non-families. 18.8% of all households were made up of individuals, and 3.1% had someone living alone who was 65 years of age or older. The average household size was 2.72 and the average family size was 3.21.

In the town, the population was spread out, with 31.0% under the age of 18, 10.3% from 18 to 24, 25.3% from 25 to 44, 20.7% from 45 to 64, and 12.6% who were 65 years of age or older. The median age was 36 years. For every 100 females, there were 107.1 males. For every 100 females age 18 and over, there were 130.8 males.

The median income for a household in the town was $21,000, and the median income for a family was $20,893. Males had a median income of $23,125 versus $13,750 for females. The per capita income for the town was $6,932. There were 39.1% of families and 46.0% of the population living below the poverty line, including 65.4% of under eighteens and none of those over 64.

== Education ==
Hickory is divided between Roff Public Schools and Sulphur Public Schools.
