= Oklahoma State Highway 110 =

State highway in Oklahoma, United States

State Highway 110

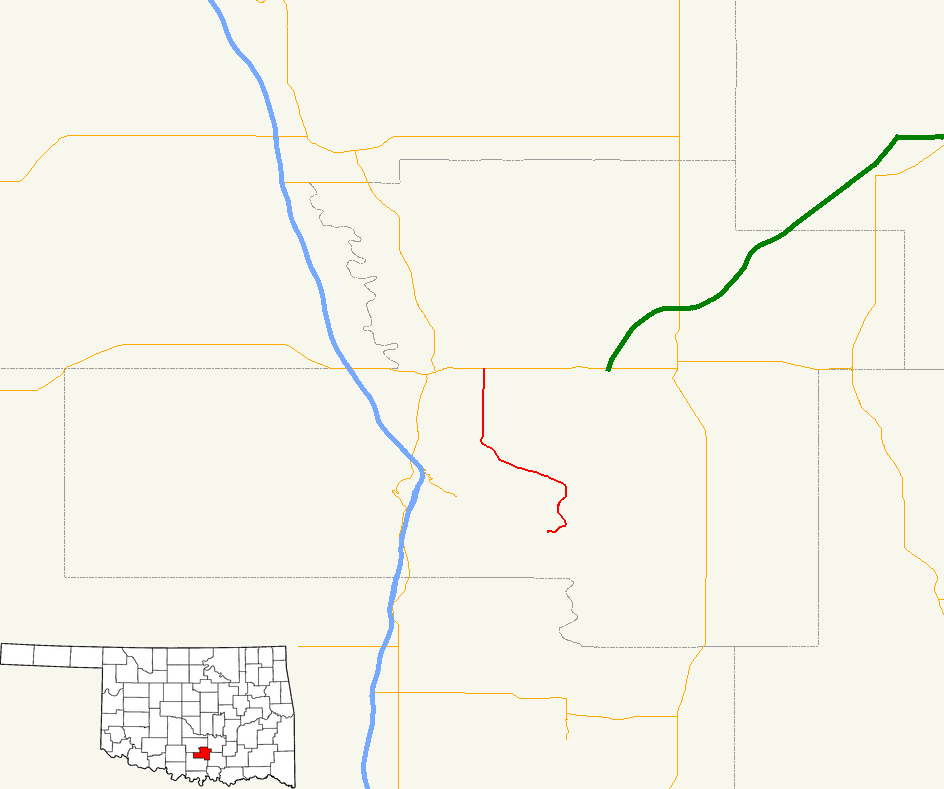

Route information
- Maintained by ODOT
- Length: 9.99 mi (16.08 km)
- Existed: 1957–1965; 1967–present

Major junctions
- North end: SH-7 in Davis
- South end: Dougherty

Location
- Country: United States
- State: Oklahoma

Highway system
- Oklahoma State Highway System; Interstate; US; State; Turnpikes
← SH-109	→ SH-112

State Highway 110 (abbreviated SH-110) is a two-lane road maintained by the U.S. state of Oklahoma. It is 9.99 miles (16.08 km) long, connecting SH-7 at its northern end to Dougherty at its southern end. Along the way, it serves the western side of the Lake of the Arbuckles and the Chickasaw National Recreation Area. It has no spur routes.

What is now SH-110 was established as SH-7C in the late 1940s. SH-110 was established along a route ending closer to Sulphur, which replaced SH-7C. When the Lake of the Arbuckles was created and inundated the highway, the SH-110 designation was applied to the former SH-7C instead.

== Route description ==
SH-110 begins at Broad Street in the town of Dougherty. The entirety of the route, between the town and SH-7 near Davis, is a winding, hilly route through the Arbuckle Mountains. From the town, the highway runs northeast, then turns north to parallel Rock Creek, the outlet from the Lake of the Arbuckles. As the highway approaches the lake, it spawns the access road to Camp Goddard, a youth camp on the shore of the lake. SH-110 then turns to the northwest. It then eventually assumes a due north course and ends at SH-7 on the eastern fringe of Davis.

== History ==
The road that is now SH-110 is first shown as part of the state highway system on the 1948 official state map. The highway was originally known as State Highway 7C and was all gravel. The route roughly followed that of the present day. In 1955, SH-7C was removed from the state highway system. The new road to Dougherty was SH-110, which traveled northeast out of town and ended at SH-7 just west of Sulphur In 1957, this route was paved.

In 1965, SH-110 was decommissioned, due to the construction of Lake of the Arbuckles, the basin of which SH-110 ran through. This left Dougherty once again without direct access to the state highway system. In 1967, SH-110 was restored as a state highway along the SH-7C route. The highway was fully paved by 1968.

== Junction list ==
The entire route is in Murray County.

Location	mi	km	Destinations	Notes
Dougherty	0.00	0.00	Broad St.	Southern terminus
Davis	9.99	16.08	SH-7	Northern terminus
1.000 mi = 1.609 km; 1.000 km = 0.621 mi
