= Oklahoma State Highway 7 =

State highway in Oklahoma, United States

State Highway 7

Route information
- Maintained by ODOT
- Length: 150.5 mi (242.2 km)

Major junctions
- West end: I-44 / US 277 / US 281 in Lawton
- US 81 from Marlow to Duncan; I-35 near Davis; US 77 in Davis
- East end: US 69 / US 75 / SH-3 in Atoka

Location
- Country: United States
- State: Oklahoma

Highway system
- Oklahoma State Highway System; Interstate; US; State; Turnpikes
← SH-6	→ SH-8

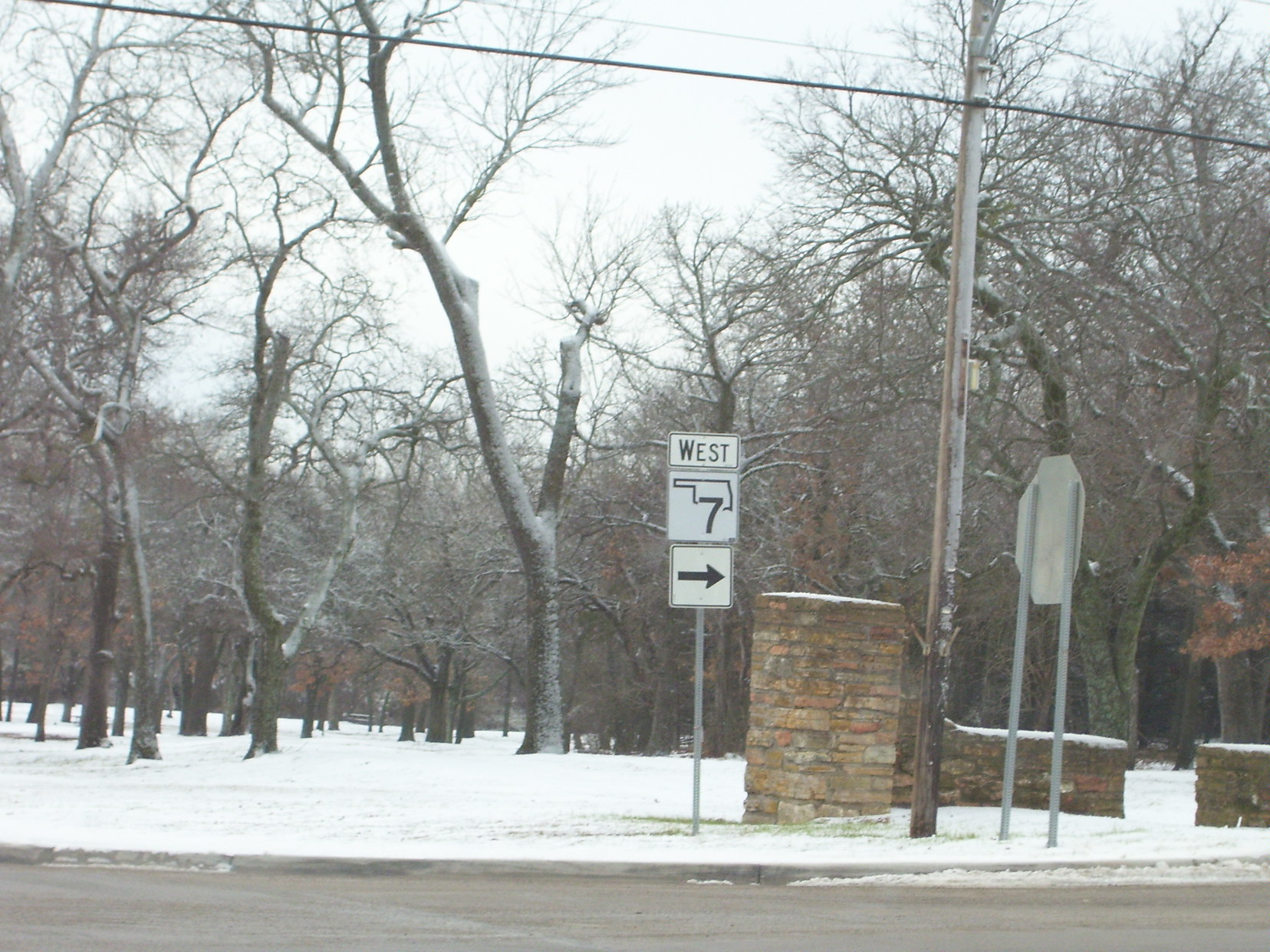
SH-7 shield in Sulphur

State Highway 7 (abbreviated SH-7) is a 150.5-mile (242.2 km) highway in southern Oklahoma. This lengthy highway connects many towns in Oklahoma's "Little Dixie" area. It runs from Interstate 44 in Lawton to U.S. 69/US-75 in Atoka.

== Route description ==
From its western terminus at the interchange with Interstate 44 and Lee Boulevard in Lawton, SH-7 is a multilane highway. It runs due east from Lawton for ten miles (16 km) before intersecting State Highway 65 in the unincorporated community of Pumpkin Center. It continues due east for 14 more miles on a straight stretch of highway only very slight curves, bypassing the town of Central High, before meeting the Duncan Bypass in Duncan.

SH-7 overlaps with the Duncan Bypass for 6 miles (9.7 km) through Duncan, after which the state highway crosses US-81, and becomes a multilane highway again, though it falls to a two-lane road after a few miles. Next the highway passes through the town of Velma before meeting State Highway 76 in Ratliff City. The southern section of SH-74, which roughly mirrors SH-76's path, has its southern terminus at SH-7 seven miles (11 km) later, near Tatums.

After crossing Interstate 35, SH-7 becomes a multilane highway once again. Three miles later, it meets US-77 near Davis. On the other side of Davis, SH-7 is the northern terminus of SH-110, a connector route to the town of Dougherty. Two miles west of Sulphur, the highway connects to the southern terminus of SH-7 Spur which connects to the Chickasaw Turnpike, a toll highway to Ada. After passing through Sulphur (where it has a brief concurrency with US-177), SH-7 travels six more miles, where it meets Highway 1.

For ten miles (16 km), SH-7 and SH-1 overlap, through the town of Mill Creek. This concurrency ends three miles (4.8 km) south of Mill Creek, where it serves the unincorporated community of Reagan and the Slippery Falls Boy Scout Ranch. It shares a one-mile (1.6 km) three-route concurrency with US-377/SH-99. Thirteen miles east of the concurrency, it serves the town of Wapanucka, Oklahoma, where it intersects SH-48. Seventeen miles later, it ends at US-75 in Atoka.

== History ==
SH-7 is a former border to border east–west state highway across southern Oklahoma whose western terminus was at the Texas border west of Hollis and eastern terminus at the Arkansas border east of Broken Bow. SH-7's route was truncated on its eastern and western sections during the 1960s and 1970s as those were concurrent with US-62 between the Texas border and Lawton and with US-70 between Broken Bow and the Arkansas border. The eastern portion of SH-7 that was concurrent with US-70 between Broken Bow and the Arkansas border was truncated in 1963 to its junction with US-70 in Broken Bow. The western section of SH-7 concurrent with US-62 from Lawton to the Texas border was truncated in 1970, when the highway's western terminus was pushed back to the intersection of Cache Road (US-62) and Sheridan Road in Lawton, and a few miles further back in 2003 to its current terminus at Interstate 44 in east Lawton.

Along still-intact sections of SH-7, major route changes through the years include a relocation in Duncan during the early 1950s, when the original route along Main Street through the downtown area was moved south of the business district along Bois D'Arc Avenue from US-81 eastward to tie in with the original Main Street route on Duncan's east side, which became SH-7 Alternate and now designated as SH-7 Business. In 1969, the main Bois D'Arc Avenue alignment in Duncan was relocated slightly to the south and the rerouting continued for some 20 miles (32 km) from the SH-7/SH-7 Business junction to Velma on a new and straighter alignment (including both multi-lane divided highway and two-lane roadway) that bypassed the old SH-7 alignment through the oil fields of eastern Stephens County along with the town of Velma. In the 1980s, the new SH-7 was extended east of Velma past the small community of County Line on the Stephens–Carter county line to west of Ratliff City in Carter County.

By 1985, the eastern terminus of SH-7 was pushed back to its intersection with SH-3 and US-69/75 in Atoka when SH-7 was again truncated and lost its concurrency with SH-3 from Atoka to Broken Bow.

== Spurs ==
SH-7 has three spur routes. Two of these routes bear the number "7" with a letter suffix; the third is a special route.

=== SH-7A ===
State Highway 7A
- Location: Duncan
- Length: 1.99 mi (3.20 km)

SH-7A, also signed as Business SH-7, is the original alignment of SH-7 through Duncan but it is unsigned. SH-7A begins at an intersection with SH-81A and Ninth Street. It heads east for approximately 1.9 miles and then turns south to meet its southern terminus at SH-7.

=== SH-7D ===
State Highway 7D
- Location: Bromide
- Length: 3.50 mi (5.63 km)

SH-7D is a 3.5-mile (5.6 km) spur to the town of Bromide.

=== SH-7 Spur ===
State Highway 7 Spur
- Location: Murray County
- Length: 4 mi (6.4 km)
- Existed: August 1, 2011–present

SH-7 Spur is a four-mile (6.4 km) spur in Murray County. It begins at SH-7 west of Sulphur, heading northeast, to end at a diamond interchange with US-177. The road continues east as the Chickasaw Turnpike.

SH-7 Spur was built by the Oklahoma Turnpike Authority (OTA) as the westernmost segment of the Chickasaw Turnpike, which opened on September 1, 1991. It was transferred from OTA to ODOT on August 1, 2011, receiving the SH-7 Spur designation and becoming a free road. It was the first segment of turnpike in Oklahoma to be transferred to ODOT. Transferring the turnpike was considered an inexpensive way to solve the problem of excessive truck traffic in Sulphur. At the time of the transfer, the interchange at the eastern terminus only allowed access from the westbound turnpike to US-177, and from US-177 to the eastbound turnpike. ODOT had expanded the interchange to a full interchange by 2013.

== Junction list ==
County	Location	mi	km	Destinations	Notes
Comanche	Lawton	0.0	0.0	I-44 / US 277 / US 281	Western terminus
Comanche	Pumpkin Center	9.4	15.1	SH-65	
Stephens	Marlow–Duncan line	22.5	36.2	Duncan Bypass	Northern terminus of Duncan Bypass; northern end of concurrency
Stephens	Marlow–Duncan line	30.4	48.9	US 81	Southern terminus of Duncan Bypass; southern end of concurrency
Carter	Ratliff City	58.1	93.5	SH-76	
Carter		65.2	104.9	SH-74	Southern terminus of SH-74
Murray		79.3	127.6	I-35	
Murray	Davis	82.1	132.1	US 77	Western end of US-77 concurrency
Murray	Davis	82.5	132.8	US 77	Eastern end of US-77 concurrency
Murray	Davis	84.2	135.5	SH-110	Northern terminus of SH-110
Murray	Sulphur	88.7	142.7	SH-7 Spur	Southern terminus of SH-7 Spur
Murray	Sulphur	91.2	146.8	US 177	
Murray	Sulphur	91.5	147.3	US 177	
Murray	Scullin	98.2	158.0	SH-1	Northern end of SH-1 concurrency
Johnston		109.2	175.7	SH-1	Southern end of SH-1 concurrency
Johnston		119.8	192.8	US 377 / SH-99	Southern end of US-377/SH-99 concurrency
Johnston		120.8	194.4	US 377 / SH-99	Northern end of US-377/SH-99 concurrency
Johnston		125.7	202.3	SH-7D	Southern terminus of SH-7D
Johnston	Wapanucka	133.5	214.8	SH-48	
Atoka	Atoka	150.5	242.2	US 69 / US 75 / SH-3	Eastern terminus
1.000 mi = 1.609 km; 1.000 km = 0.621 mi: Concurrency terminus
