= Chickasaw Turnpike =

Highway in Oklahoma, United States

Chickasaw Turnpike
- Chickasaw Turnpike highlighted in red

Route information
- Maintained by OTA
- Length: 13.3 mi (21.4 km)
- Existed: September 1, 1991–present
- Component highways: SH-301 entire length

Major junctions
- West end: US 177 / SH-7 Spur north of Sulphur
- East end: SH-1 near Roff

Location
- Country: United States
- State: Oklahoma
- Counties: Murray, Pontotoc

Highway system
- Oklahoma State Highway System; Interstate; US; State; Turnpikes

The Chickasaw Turnpike, also designated State Highway 301 (SH-301), is a controlled-access road in the rural south central region of the U.S. state of Oklahoma. A two-lane freeway, it stretches for 13.3 miles (21.4 km) from north of Sulphur to just south of Ada. The Oklahoma Turnpike Authority (OTA) owns, maintains, and collects tolls on the turnpike. The first section of the Chickasaw Turnpike opened on September 1, 1991.

The Chickasaw resulted from a compromise between urban and rural legislators. Originally, it was part of a now-canceled plan to connect southern and eastern Oklahoma with a longer turnpike. It was also intended to link Ada to the Interstate system. A four-mile (6.4 km) segment of the turnpike was transferred to the Oklahoma Department of Transportation (ODOT), making it a toll-free road, in 2011.

== Route description ==
The Chickasaw Turnpike takes a southwest-to-northeast route, passing through only two counties, Murray and Pontotoc. The turnpike begins in Murray County at U.S. Highway 177 (US-177) north of Sulphur; west of this interchange, the road becomes SH-7 Spur. The turnpike continues northeast into Pontotoc County. Just north of the county line is a barrier toll plaza, the only plaza along the route. Beyond the tollbooth lies an interchange serving the town of Roff. This is a partial interchange, providing access to Roff for eastbound travelers and access to the westbound lanes from Roff. The Chickasaw Turnpike then ends at SH-1.

The Chickasaw Turnpike has only two lanes for the majority of its length; however, there is a short eastbound passing lane. The Chickasaw is the only two-lane turnpike in Oklahoma. Lightly traveled, the road is used by about 2,000 vehicles per day.

== History ==
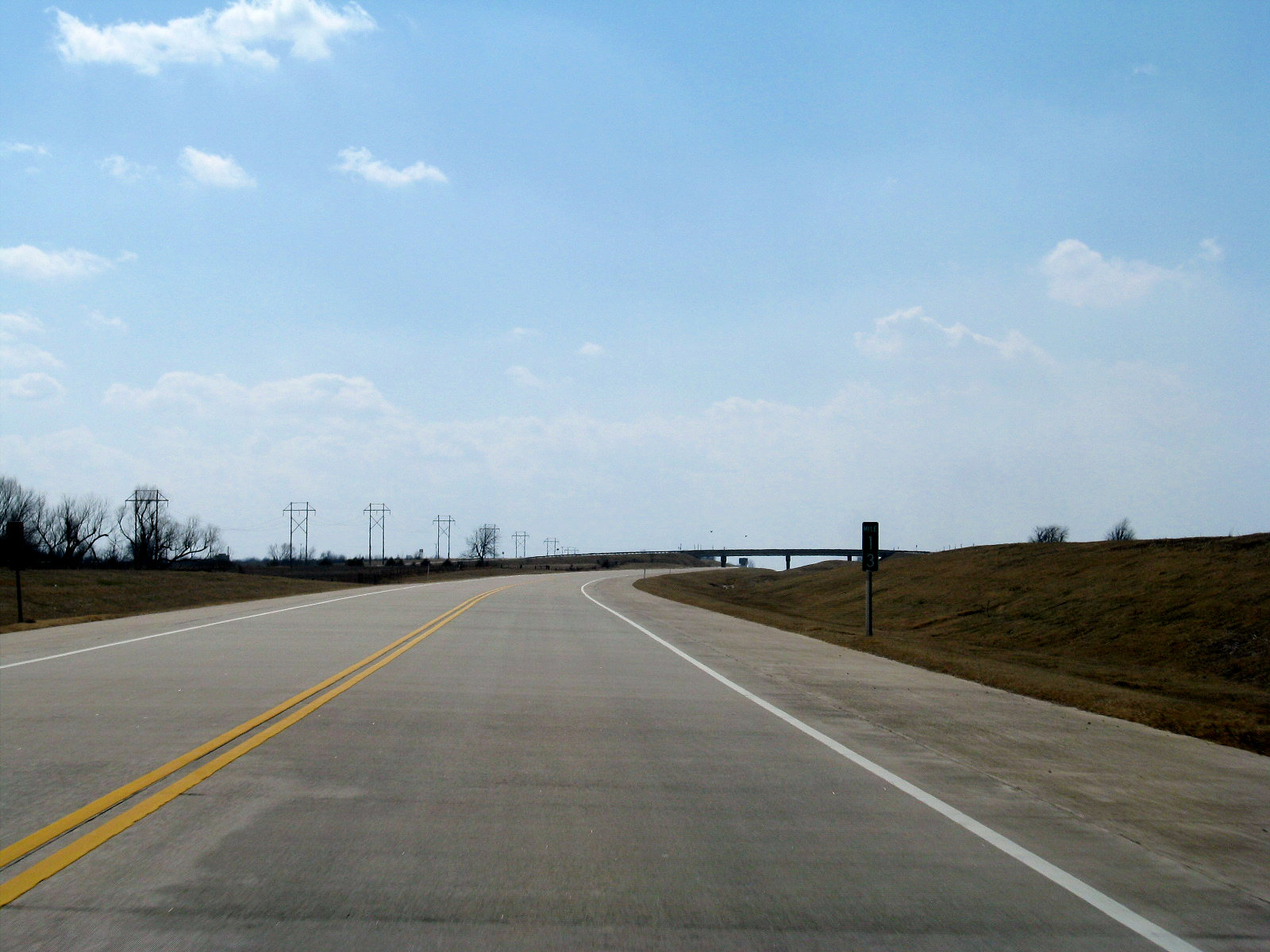
The Chickasaw Turnpike westbound at Mile 13

The Chickasaw Turnpike was originally envisioned as a corridor running from Interstate 35 (I-35) near Davis to I-40 near Henryetta. Proposed by southern Oklahoma politicians, the turnpike was intended to promote economic development by connecting Ada to the Interstate Highway System. It was proposed at the same time as three other turnpikes, which would become the Kilpatrick Turnpike in Oklahoma City, the Creek Turnpike in Tulsa, and the Cherokee Turnpike, which bypassed a mountainous section of US-412 in eastern Oklahoma. Rural legislators objected to the Kilpatrick and Creek Turnpikes, and moved to block them unless the Chickasaw Turnpike was built. Urban legislators relented and allowed the Chickasaw to be built as part of a compromise, with legislation requiring that the Chickasaw be built before work on the other two turnpikes could begin. The turnpike was authorized in 1987.

Governor Henry Bellmon opposed the Chickasaw Turnpike, arguing it would be a money loser. Bellmon had the turnpike built with only two lanes and shortened it to its current termini. Dewey F. Bartlett, Jr., an OTA board member (and future mayor of Tulsa), was later quoted as saying "I think it stinks. We never wanted to build it. It was not anything we thought was appropriate. But in order to build the three turnpikes that were necessary, that is the only way they would build it."

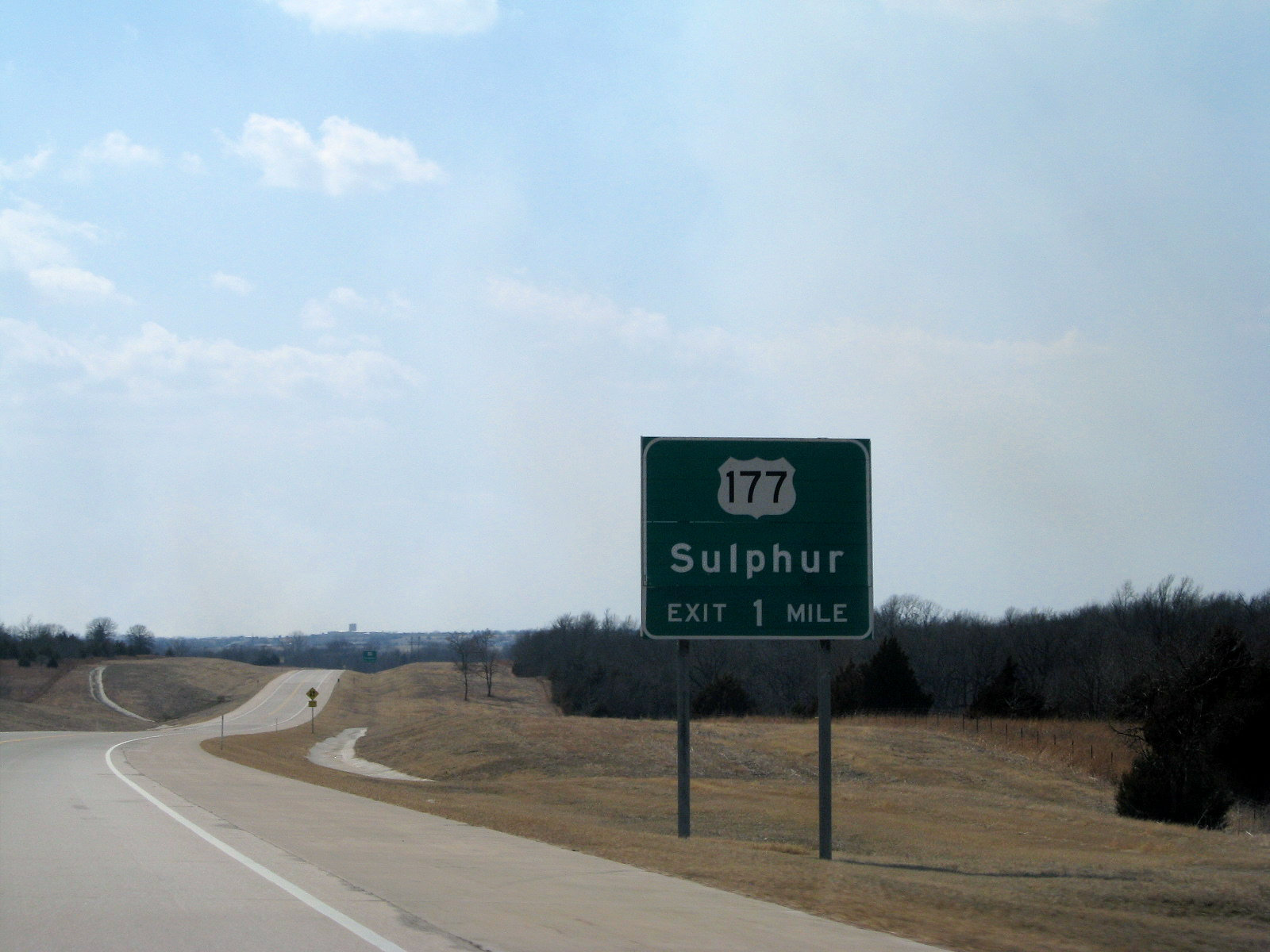
Signage for the exit at US-177, north of Sulphur

Bonds for the first section were approved in 1989. The bonds specifically permitted the turnpike to be transferred to the Oklahoma Department of Transportation and become a free road, the only turnpike in Oklahoma eligible for this type of transfer. At the time, however, ODOT director Bobby Green said that his agency could not buy the turnpike due to a lack of funds. The Chickasaw cost nearly $44 million to build (equivalent to $73.1 million in 2024). Its first section opened on September 1, 1991. Originally, the turnpike began at SH-7 west of Sulphur, proceeding northeast to the US-177 junction, then continuing northeast on its present-day alignment.

As part of his 1994 turnpike package, Governor David Walters proposed expanding the Chickasaw Turnpike to four lanes and extending it to Henryetta. The Chickasaw improvements were eventually cut from the package, which ultimately died when a commission overseeing the sale of bonds by state agencies voted against it.

The OTA voted on November 11, 2002, to open discussions about transferring the Chickasaw to ODOT. The transfer would also include a one-time payment of $14 million (equivalent to $23.3 million in 2024) for maintenance. The turnpike had deteriorated since its original construction; ODOT director Gary Ridley said that recurrent pavement problems necessitated constant repairs. He also mentioned that there were other issues, such as right-of-way problems, that could endanger ODOT's ability to draw from the federal highway trust fund. House Speaker Pro Tempore-designate Danny Hilliard opposed the transfer on the grounds of the road's poor condition, as well as objecting to the partial interchanges. The lawmaker called the Chickasaw Turnpike "an albatross" and said "I told them that unless the Turnpike Authority brought that turnpike up to ODOT specifications, and completed the interchanges at Roff and US-177 north at Sulphur, we're not interested in having that thing dumped on the taxpayers."

To address these concerns, OTA began a $12.8-million (equivalent to $19.1 million in 2024) pavement rehabilitation project on February 9, 2006. Construction constraints required the entire turnpike to be closed in March, causing traffic problems in Sulphur. The turnpike reopened on September 29, 2006. The Oklahoma Transportation Commission, which oversees ODOT, voted on August 6, 2007, to begin feasibility and cost–benefit analysis studies towards accepting the four miles (6.4 km) of the turnpike between SH-7 and US-177. On August 1, 2011, the Transportation Commission voted to transfer the section of the turnpike west of US-177 to ODOT, designating it SH-7 Spur. The commission noted that OTA had raised the new SH-7 Spur to meet ODOT standards, and that expansion of the US-177 interchange to full access was the responsibility of ODOT. This was the first time that a turnpike had been transferred from OTA to ODOT. Transferring the turnpike was considered an inexpensive way to solve the problem of excessive truck traffic in Sulphur.

The Chickasaw Turnpike originally bore no numbered designation. On August 2, 2021, the Oklahoma Transportation Commission unanimously approved a motion to apply the SH-301 designation to the turnpike. ODOT Director Tim Gatz stated in the Transportation Commission meeting that the numbering addition was primarily to aid in navigation using digital mapping and routing applications.

== Tolls ==
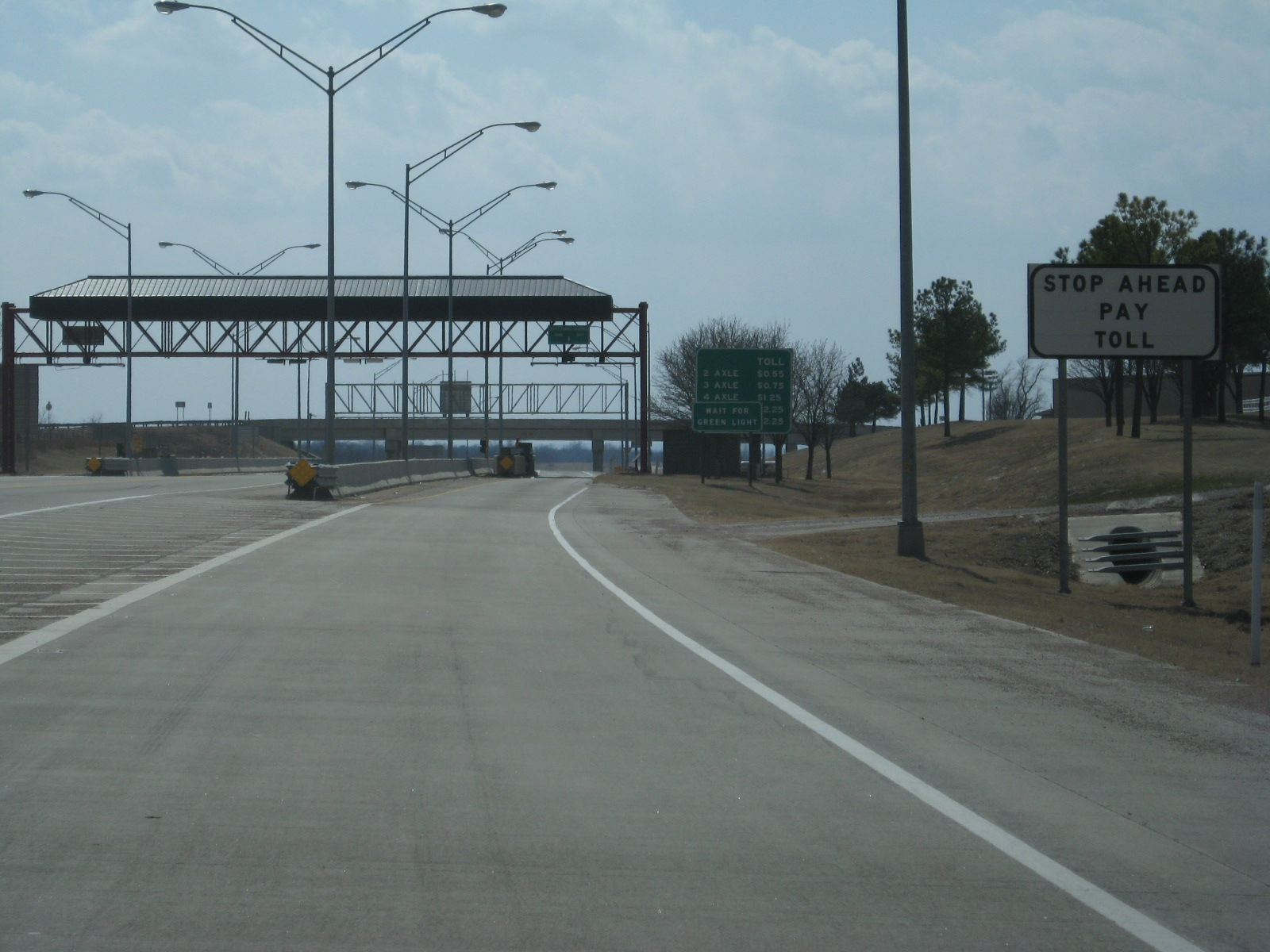
The barrier toll plaza

As of August 2022, passengers of two-axle vehicles (such as cars and motorcycles) pay tolls of $1.50 with PlatePay or 65¢ if Pikepass is used. Drivers in vehicles with more than two axles, such as truckers, pay higher tolls. Tolls are collected at the single barrier toll plaza between the US-177 and Roff interchanges. Due to the partial interchanges, it is not possible to legally use the turnpike without passing through this toll plaza. The toll is the same regardless of the point of entry or exit.

The Chickasaw Turnpike has been fully automated since shortly after it opened. As Governor Bellmon predicted, it has been a consistent money loser since opening. Improvements are funded largely through proceeds from the more profitable Turner and Will Rogers Turnpikes.

As of August 16, 2022, the Chickasaw Turnpike is now fully cashless with Pikepass or PlatePay as the option to pay the toll.

== Exit list ==
All exits are unnumbered.

County	Location	mi	km	Destinations	Notes
Murray		0.0	0.0	SH-7 Spur west	Continuation of roadway
Murray		0.0	0.0	US 177 – Sulphur	Current western terminus; eastern terminus of SH 7 spur (SH 7 spur exit 5)
Murray		2.8	4.5	Toll plaza	
Pontotoc		8.2	13.2	Dolberg Road – Roff	Eastbound exit and westbound entrance
Pontotoc		13.3	21.4	SH-1 – Ada, Mill Creek	Eastern terminus
1.000 mi = 1.609 km; 1.000 km = 0.621 mi: Electronic toll collection; Incomplete access
