= Halstead Hospital (Halstead, Kansas) =

Hospital in Halstead, Kansas

Coordinates: 38.0019°N 97.5084°W

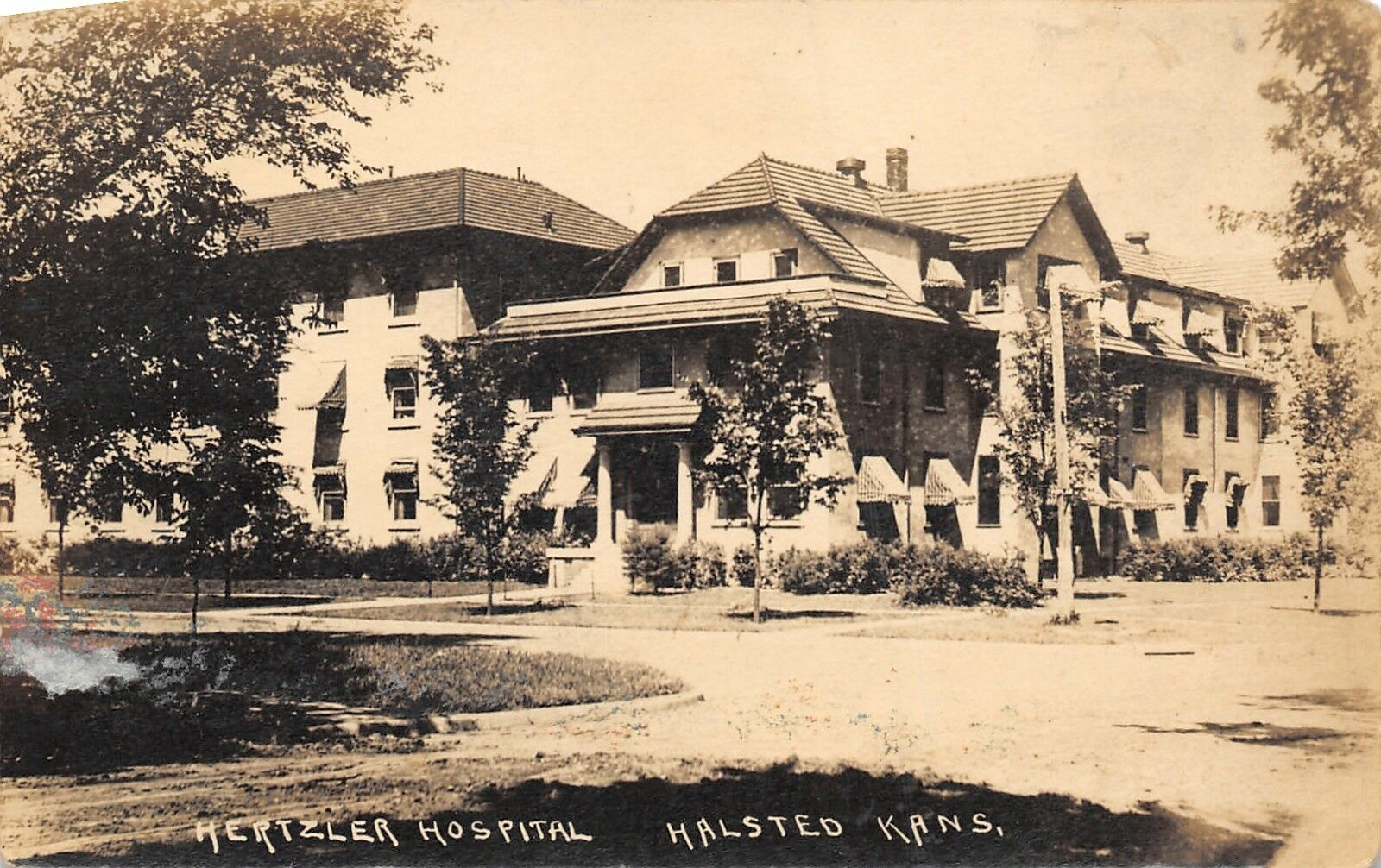
Photograph of the Hertzler Hospital in Halstead, Kansas c. 1910

The Halstead Hospital, originally known as the Hertzler Hospital, was a hospital in Halstead, Kansas, founded by Arthur E. Hertzler in 1902 in an eight-room residence. Following the death of Hertzler's daughter Agnes Hertzler Huebert in 1925, the hospital's name was changed to the Agnes Hertzler Memorial Hospital.

In 1932, the hospital was given by Hertzler to the Sisters of Saint Joseph of Wichita. Over the years, the hospital expanded into a complex of buildings with a size of over 260,000 square feet.

The hospital closed in 2002.It remained open for a drug treatment facility and small health care center until 2005 when the property was listed for sale by Realtor Andrea Cavgalar, formally of Prudential, and she listed the property on eBay. The property went under contract 3 times, once to a Florida investor, then a person the city fought to keep from closing on it due to his proposed future use of the property. The third time was the charm when it was finally purchased by someone with a vision and great hope for the property. However, the new owners plan never came to fruition, and the property suffered the consequences of time. In spite of efforts to re-use the hospital buildings for medical purposes, the premises were eventually put up for auction in 2022.
