= Joy, Oklahoma =

- Unincorporated community
- Location within Oklahoma Location within the United States
- Coordinates: 34°35′37″N 97°08′32″W
- Country: United States
- State: Oklahoma
- County: Murray
- Elevation: 843 ft (257 m)
- Time zone: UTC-6 (Central (CST))
  - Summer (DST): UTC-5 (CDT)
- GNIS feature ID: 1094267

Joy is a community in Murray County, Oklahoma, United States. It is north of Davis and south of Wynnewood along US Route 77. It was named for the nearby Joy School. Joy School, in turn, was the name selected from a 1922 student contest to choose a new name when the Carr Flats, Talley, and Wheeler schools consolidated.

On May 19, 2010, an EF1 tornado struck Joy, damaging houses, outbuildings, trees and power poles.

On May 9, 2016, an EF3 tornado struck Joy, damaging about 80% of the land area in Joy, damaging houses, trees, and even roads around the area.
