= Barefoot and pregnant =

Phrase promoting the housewifery of women

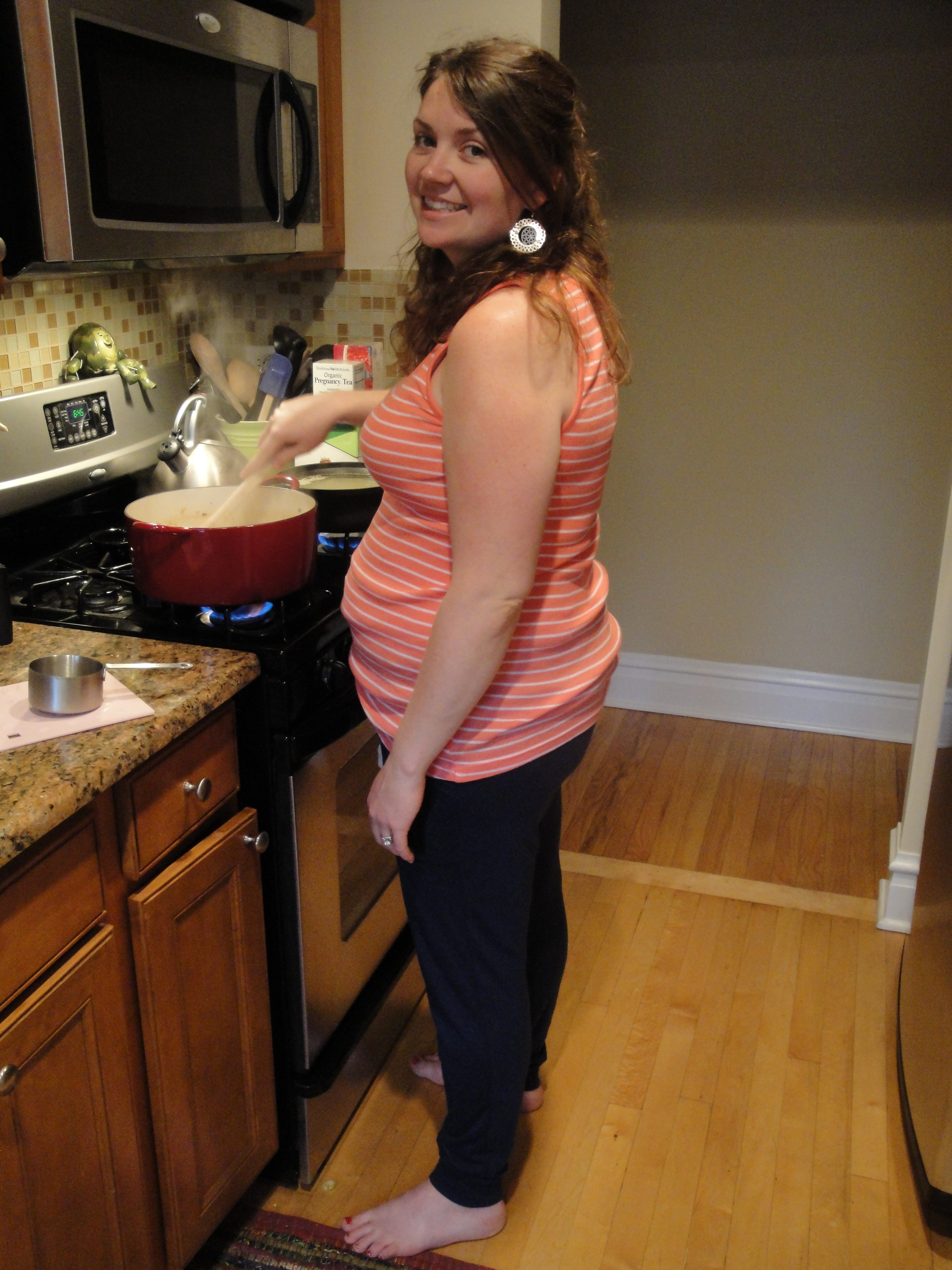
A woman barefoot and pregnant in a kitchen

"Barefoot and pregnant" is a figure of speech most commonly associated with the idea that women should not work outside the home and should have many children during their reproductive years.

The phrase "barefoot and pregnant" seems to have been introduced in the early twentieth century by the American doctor Arthur E. Hertzler, who said: "Some vulgar person has said that when the wife is kept barefooted and pregnant there are no divorces." By the mid 20th century, the phrase had passed into common parlance, so much so that an article from 1949 states: "By early 1949, TWA was—in the words of its new president, Ralph S. Damon—both 'barefoot and pregnant.'"

The variation "barefoot and pregnant in the kitchen" has been associated with the phrase "Kinder, Küche, Kirche" (translated "children, kitchen, church"), used under the German Empire to describe a woman's role in society. A comparable phrase, "Good Wife, Wise Mother", emerged in Meiji-period Japan (1868–1912).

== Negative connotations ==
A common assumption is that the expression relates to housewives not leaving the home, and thus not needing shoes. Indeed, in the sex discrimination case of Volovsek v. Wisconsin Dept. of Agric., No. 02-2074 (7th Cir. September 18, 2003), the United States Court of Appeals for the Seventh Circuit ruled that a woman who allegedly overheard her manager using the phrase could take her case to a jury. However, the court also dismissed the remaining claims on summary judgment with respect to both discrimination and retaliation against DATCP for lack of evidence.

Feminists often cite the phrase in a negative, socially critical context. The phrase is used to describe women unable to function as responsible, adult mothers, either by (a) oppression and/or (b) failure by the female to meet developmental challenges and reach adulthood. Author Shinine Antony wrote a 2002 collection of short stories entitled Barefoot and Pregnant, explaining in a later interview that, "Barefoot And Pregnant is a phrase that pokes fun at chauvinists who want their women barefoot (so that they are unable to socialize) and pregnant (helpless). This follows the general image of society in which women are merely objects."

Annually, the Philadelphia chapter of the National Organization for Women bestows a Barefoot and Pregnant Award "to persons in the community who have done the most to perpetuate outmoded images of women and who have refused to recognize that women are, in fact, human beings."

== See also ==
- Natalism
- Pregnancy discrimination
- Sexism
