= Arthur E. Hertzler =

American physician

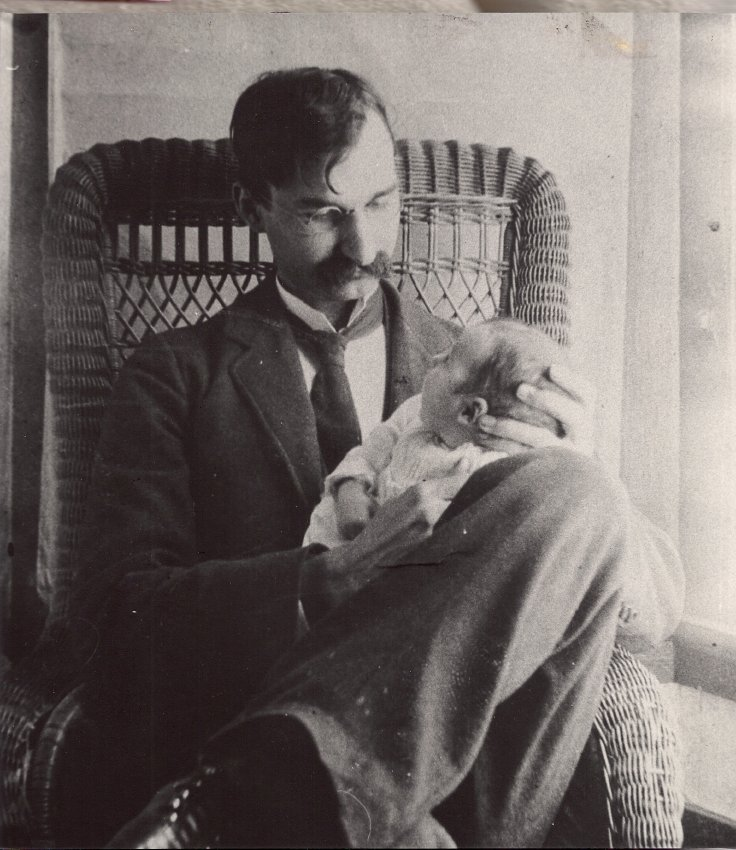
- Arthur E. Hertzler and his daughter Agnes Hertzler, c. 1896
- Born: July 26, 1870; West Point, Iowa
- Died: September 12, 1946 (aged 76); Halstead, Kansas
- Citizenship: United States
- Occupation: Physician
- Years active: 1905-1946
- Notable work: The Horse and Buggy Doctor

Arthur E. Hertzler (26 July 1870–12 September 1946) was an American physician who, in addition to his lengthy medical career, which included the founding of a hospital, is now primarily known for two things; his bestselling book The Horse and Buggy Doctor, and his reporting of the term "barefooted and pregnant" in that book. His work has been described as visionary and iconoclastic, and the medical historian Thomas Bonner described his personality as “colorful and distinctive”.

== Life ==
Arthur Emanuel Hertzler was born in 1870 in West Point, Iowa, the son of Daniel Hertzler and Johanna Maria Hertzler (née Krehbiel). They moved to Moundridge, Kansas, where Hertzler spent his childhood. Following his medical training, he moved to Halstead, Kansas and started a clinic there in 1895. Since there was no local hospital, he founded the Halstead Hospital there in 1902.

In addition to his medical practice, Hertzler joined the faculty of the University of Kansas School of Medicine in 1909.

Hertzler published several books. In 1918, he published a medical manual, Surgical Operations with Local Anesthesia, which became popular among doctors at the time. After his death, a letter of appreciation from Albert Einstein for his book The Grounds of an Old Surgeon's Faith was found amongst Hertzler's papers, as was a letter from the author Margaret Mitchell in which she wrote about her appreciation of his work, citing his book Ventures in Science of a Country Surgeon.

In his book The Horse and Buggy Doctor, first published in 1938, Hertzler related an anecdote, stating critically that:

"Some vulgar person has said that when the wife is kept barefooted and pregnant there are no divorces. Bad as this sounds, it is so because it is so near the truth; but it does not fit into our growing notion of what constitutes civilized society."

The term "barefooted and pregnant" subsequently entered American poliltical discourse, in the context of debates relating to feminism, sexism and women's rights.

After a medical career lasting over 50 years, Hertzler died in 1946 at the age of 76, in the hospital he founded in Halstead.
