= Halstead, Kansas =

City in Harvey County, Kansas

- City
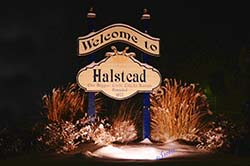
- Greeting sign (2011)

- Location within Harvey County and Kansas

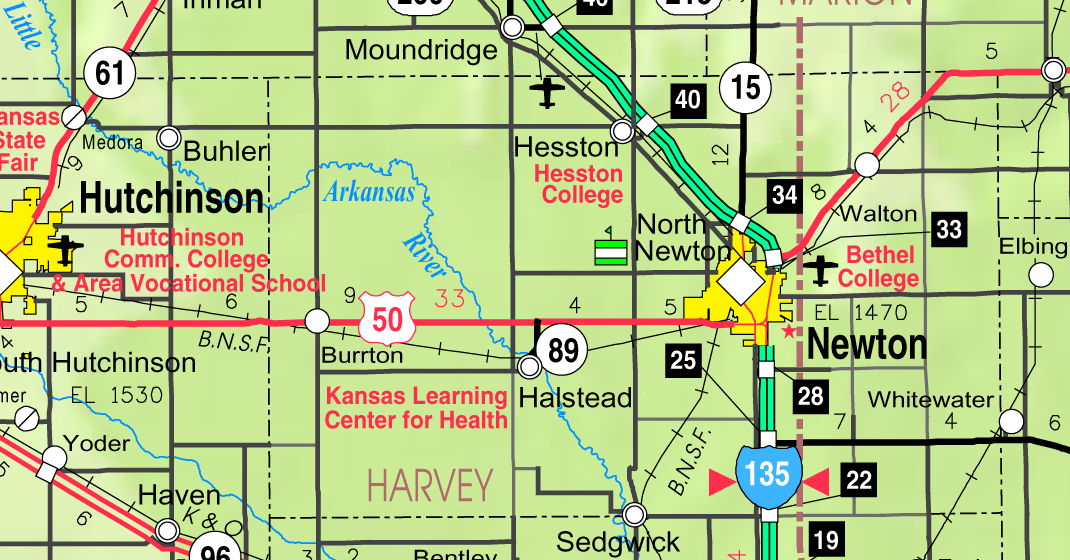
- KDOT map of Harvey County (legend)
- Coordinates: 38°00′14″N 97°30′42″W
- Country: United States
- State: Kansas
- County: Harvey
- Township: Halstead, Lakin
- Platted: 1873
- Incorporated: 1877
- Named for: Murat Halstead

Government
  - Type: Mayor–Council

Area
  - Total: 1.35 sq mi (3.49 km^{2})
  - Land: 1.35 sq mi (3.49 km^{2})
  - Water: 0 sq mi (0.00 km^{2})
- Elevation: 1,391 ft (424 m)

Population (2020)
  - Total: 2,179
  - Density: 1,620/sq mi (624/km^{2})
- Time zone: UTC-6 (CST)
  - Summer (DST): UTC-5 (CDT)
- ZIP Code: 67056
- Area code: 316
- FIPS code: 20-29600
- GNIS ID: 485586
- Website: halsteadks.com

Halstead is a city in Harvey County, Kansas, United States. Halstead was named in honor of Murat Halstead, a respected Civil War correspondent and newspaper editor. As of the 2020 census, the population of the city was 2,179.

== History ==
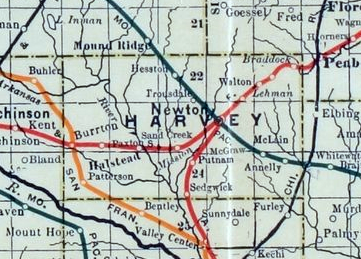
1915 railroad map of Harvey County

For millennia, the land now known as Kansas was inhabited by Native Americans. In 1803, most of modern Kansas was secured by the United States as part of the Louisiana Purchase. In 1854, the Kansas Territory was organized, then in 1861 Kansas became the 34th U.S. state. In 1872, Harvey County was founded.

Halstead was laid out in 1873. The first post office at Halstead was established in April 1873. Halstead was incorporated as a city in 1877.

Arthur Hertzler, the "Horse-and-Buggy Doctor," devoted much of his life and energies to the medical environment of Halstead, founding the Hertzler Hospital, a clinic and hospital for the area residents, later known as the Halstead Hospital.

== Geography ==
According to the United States Census Bureau, the city has a total area of 1.31 square miles (3.39 km^{2}), all land.

=== Climate ===
The climate in this area is characterized by hot, humid summers and generally mild to cool winters. According to the Köppen Climate Classification system, Halstead has a humid subtropical climate, abbreviated "Cfa" on climate maps.

== Demographics ==
Historical population
Census	Pop.	Note	%±
1890	1,071		—
1900	914		−14.7%
1910	1,004		9.8%
1920	1,163		15.8%
1930	1,373		18.1%
1940	1,397		1.7%
1950	1,328		−4.9%
1960	1,598		20.3%
1970	1,716		7.4%
1980	1,994		16.2%
1990	2,015		1.1%
2000	1,873		−7.0%
2010	2,085		11.3%
2020	2,179		4.5%
U.S. Decennial Census

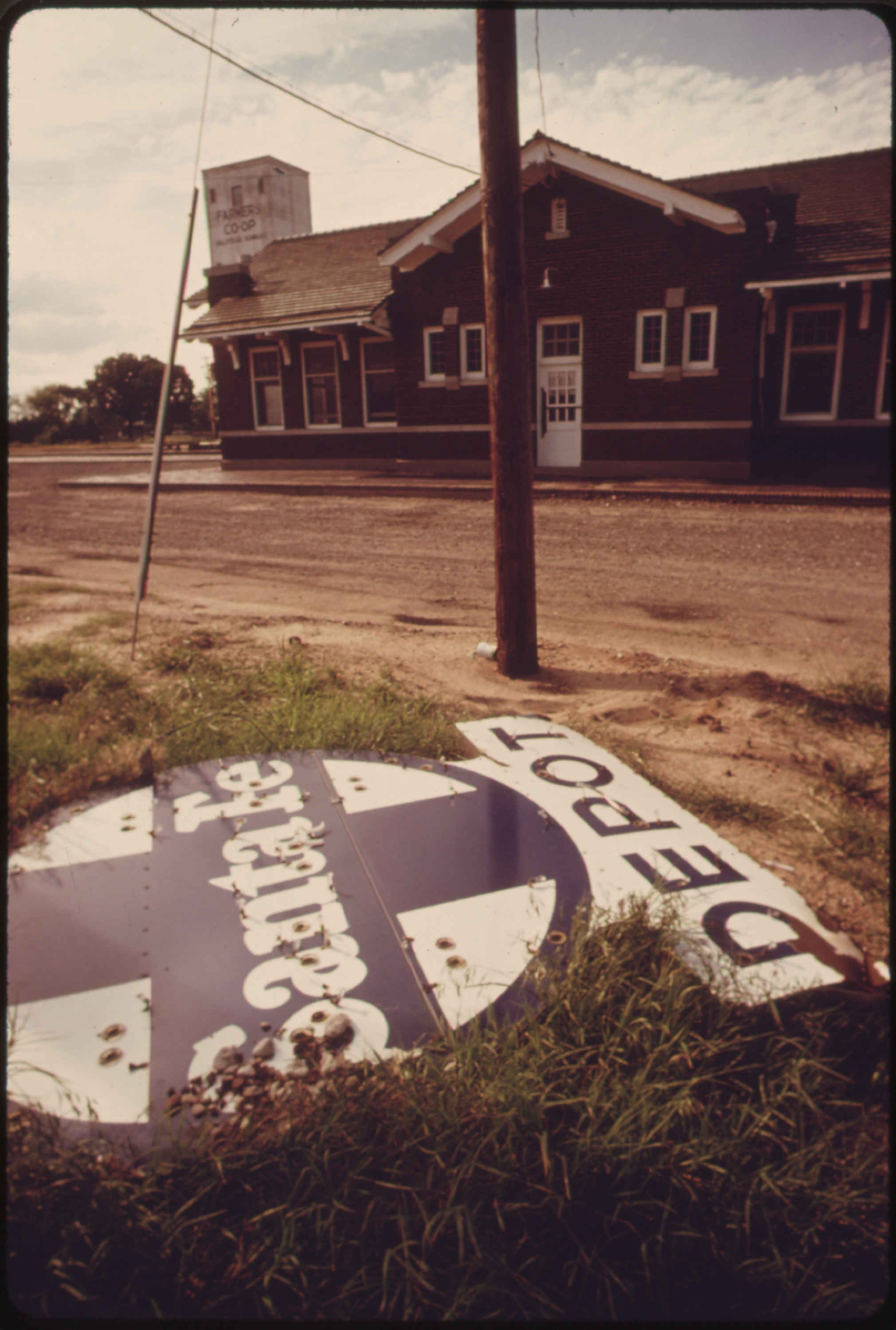
Abandoned Santa Fe depot sign in Halstead, 1974. Photo by Charles O'Rear.

=== 2020 census ===
As of the 2020 census, Halstead had a population of 2,179 people, including 831 households and 565 families.

The population density was 1,616.5 inhabitants per square mile (624.1/km^{2}). There were 914 housing units at an average density of 678.0 per square mile (261.8/km^{2}); 9.1% of housing units were vacant. The homeowner vacancy rate was 1.9% and the rental vacancy rate was 13.5%.

Of the 831 households, 36.8% had children under age 18 living in them. Of all households, 51.0% were married-couple households, 14.9% were households with a male householder and no spouse or partner present, and 26.4% were households with a female householder and no spouse or partner present. About 26.8% of all households were made up of individuals, and 11.8% had someone living alone who was 65 years of age or older. The average household size was 2.5 and the average family size was 3.0.

The median age was 38.6 years. 27.6% of residents were under the age of 18, 7.3% were from 18 to 24, 23.5% were from 25 to 44, 23.5% were from 45 to 64, and 18.2% were 65 years of age or older. For every 100 females, there were 90.8 males, and for every 100 females age 18 and over, there were 85.6 males.

0.0% of residents lived in urban areas, while 100.0% lived in rural areas. Non-Hispanic White residents accounted for 90.0% of the population.

Racial composition as of the 2020 census
Race	Number	Percent
White	2,006	92.1%
Black or African American	12	0.6%
American Indian and Alaska Native	5	0.2%
Asian	1	0.0%
Native Hawaiian and Other Pacific Islander	2	0.1%
Some other race	16	0.7%
Two or more races	137	6.3%
Hispanic or Latino (of any race)	102	4.7%

=== Educational attainment ===
The proportion of those with a bachelor's degree or higher was estimated to be 13.0% of the population.

=== Income and poverty ===
The 2016–2020 5-year American Community Survey estimates show that the median household income was $51,944 (with a margin of error of +/- $7,228) and the median family income was $68,243 (+/- $11,479). Males had a median income of $39,911 (+/- $3,405) versus $26,489 (+/- $2,801) for females. The median income for those above 16 years old was $32,159 (+/- $3,406). Approximately, 13.5% of families and 15.4% of the population were below the poverty line, including 25.4% of those under the age of 18 and 9.7% of those ages 65 or over.

=== 2010 census ===
As of the census of 2010, there were 2,085 people, 825 households, and 572 families residing in the city. The population density was 1,591.6 inhabitants per square mile (614.5/km^{2}). There were 917 housing units at an average density of 700.0 per square mile (270.3/km^{2}). The racial makeup of the city was 96.7% White, 0.5% African American, 0.2% Native American, 0.3% Asian, 0.7% from other races, and 1.5% from two or more races. Hispanic or Latino of any race were 3.9% of the population.

There were 825 households, of which 36.4% had children under the age of 18 living with them, 53.7% were married couples living together, 12.2% had a female householder with no husband present, 3.4% had a male householder with no wife present, and 30.7% were non-families. 28.1% of all households were made up of individuals, and 13.2% had someone living alone who was 65 years of age or older. The average household size was 2.47 and the average family size was 3.00.

The median age in the city was 37.6 years. 28.5% of residents were under the age of 18; 6.1% were between the ages of 18 and 24; 24.4% were from 25 to 44; 24.3% were from 45 to 64; and 16.7% were 65 years of age or older. The gender makeup of the city was 48.0% male and 52.0% female.

== Area events ==
- Halstead Old Settlers.

== Area attractions ==
- Halstead Heritage Museum and Depot. In August 1988, the Halstead Historical Society was formed for the sole purpose of purchasing and restoring the Halstead Santa Fe Train Depot Railway Station, opening the Halstead Heritage Museum and Depot on March 18, 1995. The museum preserves Halstead history and features exhibits detailing the founding and naming of Halstead, local Mennonite Heritage, the Halstead Hospital School of Nursing, and the lives of local historic figures such as Bernard Warkentin and Arthur E. Hertzler. The museum also features the original "swan boat" from the 1955 film Picnic, which was primarily filmed in Halstead.

== Parks and recreation ==
- Scout Park
- Riverside Park
- Williams Park

== Education ==
The community is served by Halstead–Bentley USD 440 public school district.

- Halstead High School in Halstead.
- Halstead Middle School in Halstead.
- Bentley Primary School in Bentley.

== Media ==
=== Films ===
- Picnic (1955) - An ex-college football star turned drifter arrives in a small Kansas town on Labor Day. The picnic scene was filmed in the Riverside Park on the north side of Halstead.
- The Parade (1984) - A made-for-television movie in which an ex-con returns to his Kansas hometown days before the town's annual Fourth of July parade. It was filmed in Halstead.

== Notable people ==
See also List of people from Harvey County, Kansas

- Jim Roper, NASCAR driver
- Adolph Rupp, NCAA basketball coach
- Arthur E. Hertzler, who practiced medicine in Halstead for 50 years and founded the Halstead Hospital

== Gallery ==
- Historic Images of Halstead, Special Photo Collections at Wichita State University Library
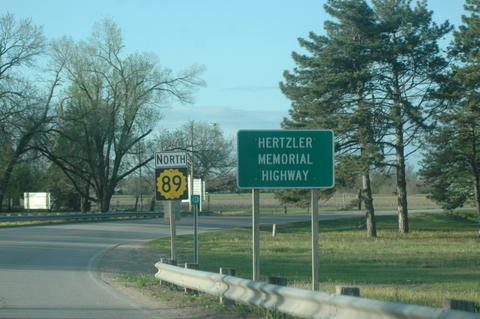
Halstead city limits in 2007

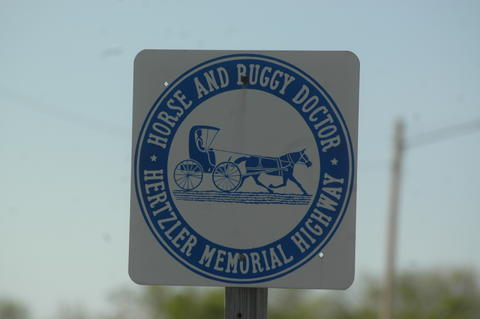
Sign north of city in 2007

== See also ==
- National Register of Historic Places listings in Harvey County, Kansas
  - Bernhard Warkentin Homestead
- Threshing Stone
- La Junta Subdivision, branch of the BNSF Railway
- Arkansas Valley Interurban Railway
