= Jim Roper =

American racing driver (1916–2000)

- Born: Christian David Roper; August 13, 1916; Halstead, Kansas, U.S.
- Died: June 23, 2000 (aged 83); Newton, Kansas, U.S.
- Cause of death: Heart and liver failure caused by cancer
- Achievements: Winner of first NASCAR race

NASCAR Cup Series career
- 2 races run over 1 year
- Best finish: 16th (1949)
- First race: Race No. 1 (Charlotte)
- Last race: 1949 Race No. 3 (Occoneechee)
- First win: Race No. 1 (Charlotte)
Wins	Top tens	Poles
1	1	0
- Statistics up to date as of August 11, 2025.

Christian David "Jim" Roper (August 13, 1916 – June 23, 2000) was an American NASCAR driver. He lived in Halstead, Kansas. He is most known as the winner of the first ever NASCAR race at Charlotte.

== Racing career ==
Roper lived at his grandfather's horse farm in Halstead. Roper was interested in playing basketball until his grandfather purchased a Chevrolet Pontiac car dealership and gave a 1930 Chevy to Roper. Roper said "I raced that thing seven nights a week, even in the middle of winter, on a figure-eight dirt track, the kind you pass in the middle both ways. I could get that Chevy up to speeds of 60 to 70 miles per hour."

Roper purchased a midget car in 1944. He was first able to use the car after World War II since all racing was halted in the United States during the war. He drove numerous types of cars after the war. He won the Beacon Championship at CeJay Speedway in Wichita, Kansas in 1947 in a track roadster. He also raced on the International Motor Contest Association (IMCA) circuit in Kansas, Iowa, Nebraska, Oklahoma, and Missouri.

Roper was nicknamed "Alfalfa Jim" after he drove through a wooden fence into an alfalfa field, turned around, and finished the race with a car full of alfalfa.

== NASCAR career ==
Roper heard about the first race at a three-quarter-mile dirt track in Charlotte, NC by reading a note about it in Zack Mosley's The Adventures of Smilin' Jack comic strip in his local newspaper. Roper convinced local car dealer Millard Clothier to drive two of Clothier's Lincoln cars more than 1000 miles to Charlotte to compete on June 19, 1949. Roper finished in second to the winner Glenn Dunaway, completing 197 of 200 laps. Chief NASCAR inspector Al Crisler disqualified Dunaway's car because car owner Hubert Westmoreland had shored up the chassis by spreading the rear springs, a favorite bootlegger trick to improve traction and handling. Roper was credited with the win in NASCAR's first Strictly Stock race. Westmoreland sued NASCAR, and the judge threw out the case. NASCAR tore down Roper's motor after the race, so he had to get a replacement motor to drive back to Kansas. Clothier kept the winner's trophy.

Roper used the same car to finish fifteenth in NASCAR's third race in his only other NASCAR start. He finished sixteenth in the 1949 final points standings.

== Injury and end of racing career ==
Roper continued racing in midgets in Kansas until he broke a vertebra in a sprint car accident in Davenport, Iowa in 1955. He decided to retire after his injuries healed. "It was over for me then," he said, "so I flipped a half-dollar (coin) to decide whether to raise horses in Texas or Washington. Texas won." He later became a professional flagman and built race cars. On April 18, 1993, at age 76, he was the grand marshal of the First Union 400 in North Wilkesboro, North Carolina.

On June 23, 2000, Roper died in Newton, Kansas from heart and liver complications related to cancer.

== Motorsports career results ==
=== NASCAR ===
(key) (Bold – Pole position awarded by qualifying time. Italics – Pole position earned by points standings or practice time. * – Most laps led.)

==== Strictly Stock Series ====
NASCAR Strictly Stock Series results
Year	Team	No.	Make	1	2	3	4	5	6	7	8	NSSC	Pts	Ref
1949	R. B. McIntosh	34	Lincoln	CLT; 1	DAB	OCC; 15	LAN	HAM	MAR	HEI	NWS	16th	253	
