= Halstead–Bentley USD 440 =

Public school district in Halstead, Kansas

Address
- 521 W. 6th St. Halstead, Kansas, 67056; United States
- Coordinates: 37.9984°N 97.5127°W

District information
- Type: Public
- Grades: K to 12
- Superintendent: Ron Barry
- Schools: 3

Other information
- Website: usd440.com

Halstead–Bentley USD 440 is a public unified school district headquartered in Halstead, Kansas, United States. The district includes the communities of Halstead, Bentley, and nearby rural areas.

== Schools ==
The school district operates the following schools:

- Halstead High School (9-12)
- Halstead Middle School (4-8)
- Bentley Primary School (K-3)

== See also ==
- Kansas State Department of Education
- Kansas State High School Activities Association
- List of high schools in Kansas
- List of unified school districts in Kansas
