= Murray County, Oklahoma =

County in Oklahoma, United States

- County
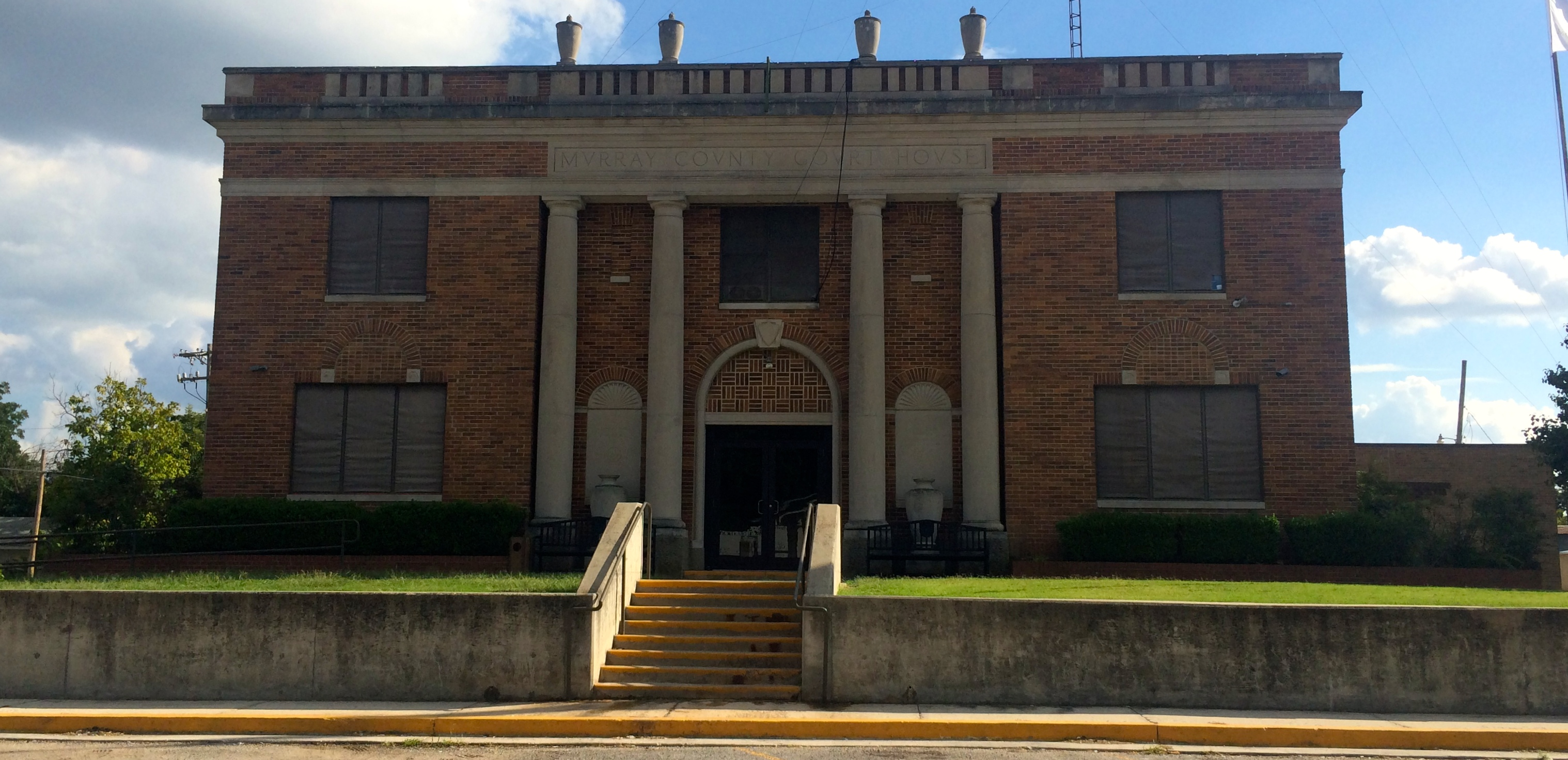
- Murray County Courthouse in September 2014

- Location within the U.S. state of Oklahoma
- Coordinates: 34°29′N 97°04′W
- Country: United States
- State: Oklahoma
- Founded: 1907
- Seat: Sulphur
- Largest city: Sulphur

Area
  - Total: 425 sq mi (1,100 km^{2})
  - Land: 416 sq mi (1,080 km^{2})
  - Water: 8.6 sq mi (22 km^{2}) 2.0%

Population (2020)
  - Total: 13,904
  - Estimate (2025): 13,805 ▼
  - Density: 33.4/sq mi (12.9/km^{2})
- Congressional district: 4th

Murray County is a county located in the southern part of the U.S. state of Oklahoma. As of the 2020 census, the population was 13,904. The county seat is Sulphur. The county was named for William H. Murray, a member and president of the Oklahoma Constitutional Convention and later a Governor of Oklahoma.

== History ==
The area now occupied by Murray County was part of the land granted to the Choctaw Nation by the Treaty of Dancing Rabbit Creek in 1820. The Chickasaw received part of the land under the Treaty of Doaksville in 1838. The area became part of the Chickasaw Nation in 1855. There was an extended conflict before the U.S. Civil War between the Plains Indians and the newly arrived Choctaws and Chickasaws. The U.S. Army built Fort Towson (1824), Fort Washita (1842), and Fort Arbuckle (1851) to protect the Chickasaws. After the conflict between the tribes was settled, various bands of outlaws moved in and continued to create law enforcement problems.

Sulphur began developing in the 1880s around the springs for which it was named. The springs encouraged the building of bathhouses and spas. Several were established by the time that a post office was established in 1898. The Sulphur Springs Railway (acquired by the St. Louis and San Francisco Railway in 1907) arrived there in 1902, and the 1904 establishment of Platt National Park, with headquarters at Sulphur, spurred the expansion of services for health-seekers. Other visitors were drawn to the park and to nearby Turner Falls, making Sulphur one of the state's earliest recreational centers.

Until statehood, the area of the present-day county was a part of Pickens County, Chickasaw Nation. Murray County was created when the Chickasaw Nation was disestablished immediately before Oklahoma statehood. Sulphur was declared as the county seat.

== Geography ==
According to the U.S. Census Bureau, the county has a total area of 425 square miles (1,100 km^{2}), of which 416 square miles (1,080 km^{2}) is land and 8.6 square miles (22 km^{2}) (2.0%) is water. It is the third-smallest county in Oklahoma by land area and second-smallest by total area. The county's northern section lies in the Sandstone Hills physiographic region and is suitable for farming, while the southern portion is in the Arbuckle Mountains region, which is dominated by rolling hills and rock outcrops. The Washita River drains the county. Chickasaw National Recreation Area (CNRA) lies in the county. Lake of the Arbuckles, part of CNRA, was completed on Rock Creek in 1966.

=== Major highways ===
- Interstate 35
- U.S. Highway 77
- U.S. Highway 177
- Chickasaw Turnpike
- State Highway 1
- State Highway 7
- State Highway 110

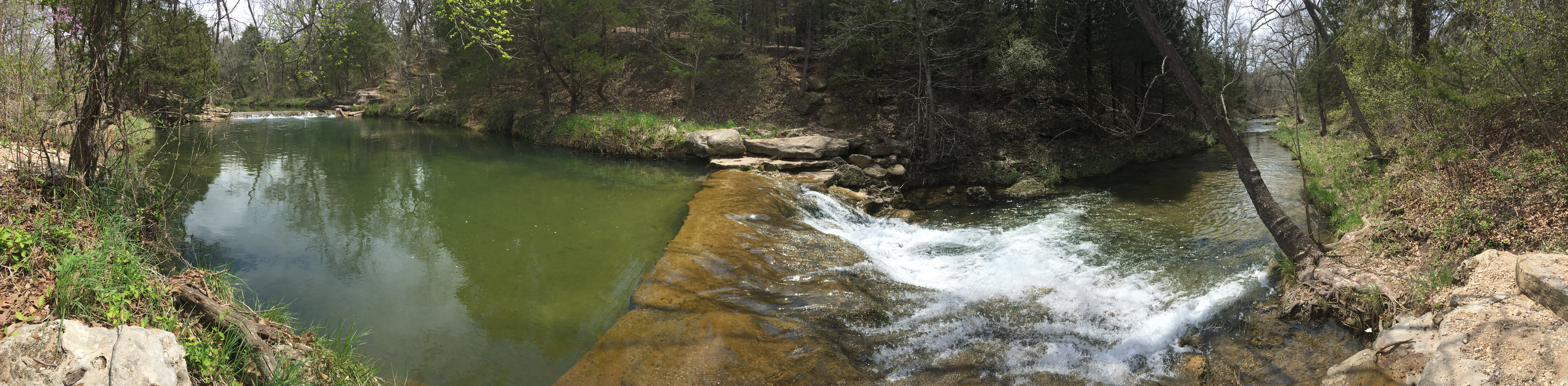
Chickasaw National Recreation Area

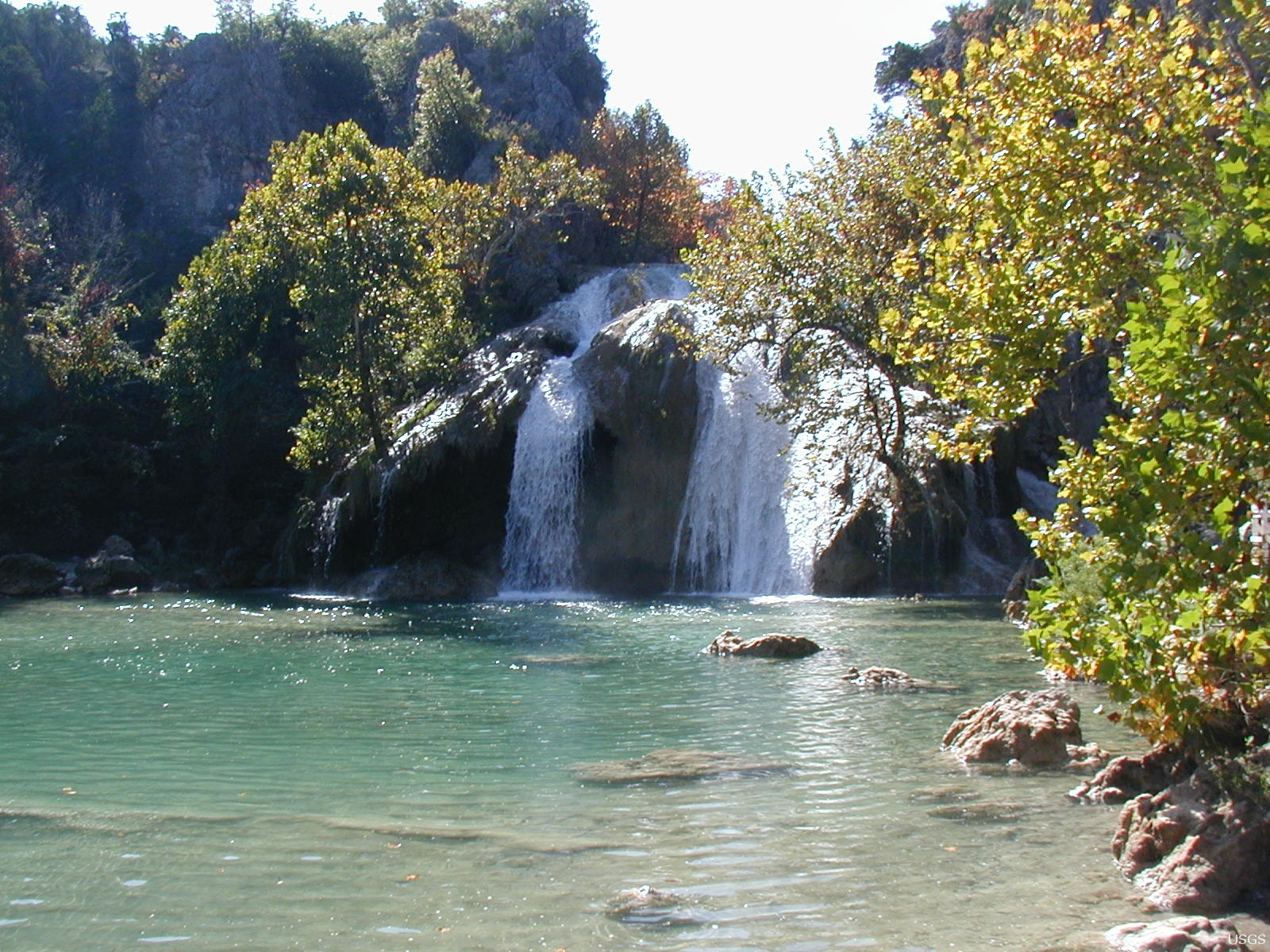
Turner Falls

=== Protected areas ===
- Turner Falls State Park
- Chickasaw National Recreation Area

=== Adjacent counties ===
- Pontotoc County (northeast)
- Johnston County (southeast)
- Carter County (southwest)
- Garvin County (northwest)

== Demographics ==
Historical population
Census	Pop.	Note	%±
1910	12,744		—
1920	13,115		2.9%
1930	12,410		−5.4%
1940	13,841		11.5%
1950	10,775		−22.2%
1960	10,622		−1.4%
1970	10,669		0.4%
1980	12,147		13.9%
1990	12,042		−0.9%
2000	12,623		4.8%
2010	13,488		6.9%
2020	13,904		3.1%
2025 (est.)	13,805	▼	−0.7%
U.S. Decennial Census; 1790-1960 1900-1990; 1990-2000 2010

=== 2020 census ===
As of the 2020 census, the county had a population of 13,904. Of the residents, 23.3% were under the age of 18 and 20.9% were 65 years of age or older; the median age was 41.9 years. For every 100 females there were 102.4 males, and for every 100 females age 18 and over there were 100.3 males.

The racial makeup of the county was 69.5% White, 1.2% Black or African American, 14.5% American Indian and Alaska Native, 0.3% Asian, 2.7% from some other race, and 11.5% from two or more races. Hispanic or Latino residents of any race comprised 6.7% of the population.

There were 5,423 households in the county, of which 31.6% had children under the age of 18 living with them and 26.1% had a female householder with no spouse or partner present. About 27.4% of all households were made up of individuals and 13.3% had someone living alone who was 65 years of age or older.

There were 6,508 housing units, of which 16.7% were vacant. Among occupied housing units, 71.0% were owner-occupied and 29.0% were renter-occupied. The homeowner vacancy rate was 2.1% and the rental vacancy rate was 10.2%.

=== 2000 census ===
As of the census of 2000, there were 12,623 people, 5,003 households, and 3,587 families residing in the county. The population density was 12/km^{2} (31/mi^{2}). There were 6,479 housing units at an average density of 6/km^{2} (16/mi^{2}). The racial makeup of the county was 80.76% White, 1.90% Black or African American, 11.57% Native American, 0.32% Asian, 0.03% Pacific Islander, 1.16% from other races, and 4.26% from two or more races. 3.15% of the population were Hispanic or Latino of any race.

There were 5,003 households, out of which 30.90% had children under the age of 18 living with them, 57.70% were married couples living together, 10.20% had a female householder with no husband present, and 28.30% were non-families. 25.20% of all households were made up of individuals, and 12.70% had someone living alone who was 65 years of age or older. The average household size was 2.45 and the average family size was 2.92.

In the county, the population was spread out, with 24.20% under the age of 18, 8.00% from 18 to 24, 25.10% from 25 to 44, 24.30% from 45 to 64, and 18.50% who were 65 years of age or older. The median age was 40 years. For every 100 females there were 97.40 males. For every 100 females age 18 and over, there were 92.80 males.

The median income for a household in the county was $30,294, and the median income for a family was $37,303. Males had a median income of $28,381 versus $19,727 for females. The per capita income for the county was $16,084. About 11.10% of families and 14.10% of the population were below the poverty line, including 16.90% of those under age 18 and 15.10% of those age 65 or over.

== Politics ==
Voter Registration and Party Enrollment as of June 30, 2023
Party	Number of Voters	Percentage
Democratic	2,844	35.08%
Republican	4,084	50.37%
Others	1,180	14.55%
Total	8,108	100%

United States presidential election results for Murray County, Oklahoma
Year	Republican		Democratic		Third party(ies)	
Year	No.	%	No.	%	No.	%
1908	574	29.08%	1,111	56.28%	289	14.64%
1912	321	17.23%	987	52.98%	555	29.79%
1916	458	21.61%	1,305	61.59%	356	16.80%
1920	1,362	42.21%	1,744	54.04%	121	3.75%
1924	784	26.00%	2,083	69.09%	148	4.91%
1928	1,631	51.53%	1,498	47.33%	36	1.14%
1932	532	14.70%	3,086	85.30%	0	0.00%
1936	823	20.44%	3,181	78.99%	23	0.57%
1940	1,238	28.26%	3,126	71.35%	17	0.39%
1944	1,005	27.79%	2,602	71.96%	9	0.25%
1948	798	20.72%	3,054	79.28%	0	0.00%
1952	1,885	39.66%	2,868	60.34%	0	0.00%
1956	1,809	42.16%	2,482	57.84%	0	0.00%
1960	1,993	48.35%	2,129	51.65%	0	0.00%
1964	1,236	28.62%	3,083	71.38%	0	0.00%
1968	1,454	34.18%	1,773	41.68%	1,027	24.14%
1972	2,983	68.23%	1,294	29.60%	95	2.17%
1976	1,563	34.46%	2,932	64.64%	41	0.90%
1980	2,494	49.22%	2,384	47.05%	189	3.73%
1984	3,073	57.47%	2,229	41.69%	45	0.84%
1988	2,056	42.89%	2,697	56.26%	41	0.86%
1992	1,536	27.49%	2,594	46.42%	1,458	26.09%
1996	1,712	33.78%	2,620	51.70%	736	14.52%
2000	2,609	53.01%	2,263	45.98%	50	1.02%
2004	3,665	63.24%	2,130	36.76%	0	0.00%
2008	3,746	70.18%	1,592	29.82%	0	0.00%
2012	3,606	70.07%	1,540	29.93%	0	0.00%
2016	4,175	75.52%	1,087	19.66%	266	4.81%
2020	4,612	78.25%	1,156	19.61%	126	2.14%
2024	4,689	79.68%	1,080	18.35%	116	1.97%

== Economy ==
Farming and ranching were the basis of the economy during the time when the area was part of the Chickasaw Nation. The area was called "the Prairie of Eden" because its plentiful grasslands attracted abundant game, Chickasaw ranchers Noah Lael and Perry Froman operated and headquartered near Sulphur by 1881. Settlements of farmers and businesses expanded through the decade, spurred by the construction of rail lines by the Atchison, Topeka and Santa Fe Railway lines through to Dougherty and Davis in 1886–87. Post offices were established at Dougherty in 1887 and Davis in 1890.

Cattle ranching, the other primary industry, continued into the twenty-first century, and Murray County has long been recognized as the center of "Hereford Heaven." Notable ranching operations included those of Oklahoma Gov. Roy J. Turner. On New Year's Eve, 1947, the Flying L Ranch near Davis was the site for the marriage of Roy Rogers, "King of the Cowboys," and Dale Evans.

The location of the Oklahoma School for the Deaf at Sulphur in 1907, and a veterans center added to the region's economy. Limestone quarries were also significant. The most important example of this activity began in the 1890s at Big Canyon, home to operations of the Dolese Brothers, whose company became a major state employer.

== Communities ==
=== Cities ===
- Davis
- Sulphur (county seat)

=== Towns ===
- Dougherty
- Hickory

=== Unincorporated communities ===
- Joy
- Oak Grove

== Education ==
School districts include:

- Davis Public Schools
- Elmore City-Pernell Schools
- Mill Creek Public Schools
- Roff Public Schools
- Sulphur Public Schools
- Wynnewood Public Schools

Oklahoma School for the Deaf is in Sulphur.

== See also ==
- National Register of Historic Places listings in Murray County, Oklahoma
