= The Adventures of Smilin' Jack =

Comic strip from the USA

- Author(s): Zack Mosley
- Current status/schedule: Ended
- Launch date: October 1, 1933
- End date: April 1, 1973
- Alternate name(s): On the Wing
- Syndicate(s): Chicago Tribune New York News Syndicate
- Genre(s): Aviation

The Adventures of Smilin' Jack is an aviation comic strip that first appeared on October 1, 1933, in the Chicago Tribune and ended on April 1, 1973.

After a run of 40 years, it was the longest-running aviation comic strip. The strip was created by 27-year-old cartoonist and aviation enthusiast Zack Mosley, who had previously worked on the Buck Rogers and Skyroads strips. Mosley was a member of organizations that indicate his avid aviation research for his strip: Aircraft Owners and Pilots Association, Aviation-Space Writers Association, National Cartoonists Society, B.P.O. Elks, Silver Wings Society, OX-5 Club, and the Quiet Birdmen Fraternity for many years. On September 18, 1976, he was inducted into the Civil Air Patrol Auxiliary-USAF Hall of Honor.

Smilin' Jack was originally Mack Martin, in On the Wing, but Chicago Tribune editor Joseph Medill Patterson did not like the original title, so on December 31, 1933, the name was changed to Jack Martin, and the strip was retitled The Adventures of Smilin' Jack after its creator, who had been nicknamed "Smilin' Zack" by his colleagues. In later years it was simply known as Smilin' Jack. Zack Mosley's assistant during the 1930s and early 1940s was Boody Rogers. Smilin' Jack's appearance was based on that of notable air racing star Roscoe Turner.

The Sunday page had a topper strip, originally called Air Facts. This later became Smilin' Jack Cut-Outs, a paper doll feature, and then Smilin' Jack's Flyin' Facts.

== Characters and story ==
Dell's Four Color comic book, Smilin' Jack #36, reprinting 1938–40 strips.

Zack Mosley's Smilin' Jack (November 12, 1939)

Cover of Popped Wheat's 16-page Smilin' Jack giveaway comic book from 1947. Note no mustache.

Smilin' Jack developed a colorful and imaginative band of supporting characters through its lengthy run, including the handsome Downwind Jaxon; Fat Stuff, a humorous Hawaiian character; hillbilly mechanic Rufus Jimpson; glamorous air hostess Dixie Lee; and eventually Jack Jr., plus various romantic interests, referred to by Mosley as "de-icers". Villains included The Claw, Toemain the Terrible, The Head and his sister, The Mongoose.

Many supporting characters were drawn with distinctive visual devices. The corpulent Fat Stuff had buttons popping off his tight-fitting shirt, never explaining how the buttons magically regenerated from one panel to the next. Mosley sometimes drew a chicken in one corner of the panel, eating buttons as they flew off.

Even more distinctive was Smilin' Jack's handsome sidekick and co-pilot Downwind, whose face drove women wild with passion. Downwind's features remain a mystery; he was invariably drawn with his head in three-quarters rear view so that his face was averted from the reader. This visual device sometimes became contrived, as when a villain stood in front of Downwind aiming a weapon at him: the co-pilot would still be looking back over his shoulder, as if something more interesting was happening behind him.

== Derived works ==
=== Comic books ===
Dell Comics published the series in comic book anthology titles from 1936 and collected them in Smilin' Jack comic books from 1940.

=== Radio ===
The Smilin' Jack radio series was broadcast on the Mutual Broadcasting System from February 13 to May 19, 1939, with aviator Smilin' Jack Martin fighting such international criminals as the Mad Dog in Arabia. Frank Readick had the title role, and the cast also included Gertrude Warner. The 15-minute series, airing three times a week at 5:30pm, was sponsored by Tootsie Rolls, which offered a premium for ten candy wrappers—a flying chart "just like the one Jack uses". The program opened each episode with announcer Tom Shirley demanding, "Clear the runway for Smilin' Jack!", over the roar of an airplane.

=== Prose novel ===
"Smilin' Jack and the Daredevil Girl Pilot" was "A New Story [prose, 248 pp., w. 20 full-page illustrations] Based on the Famous Comic Strip", published in 1942 by the Whitman Publishing Co.

=== Movie serial ===
In 1943 Universal Studios produced a serial, The Adventures of Smilin' Jack. Smilin' Jack Martin (Tom Brown) works with the Chinese government to stop the Black Samurai, a Japanese covert spy ring led by the German operative Fraulein von Teufel.

== Parody ==
The strip was parodied by Harvey Kurtzman and Wally Wood in Mad #7 (October–November 1953) as "Smilin' Melvin!", with Fat Stuff renamed Thatstuff and Downwind altered to Upwind. The parody explained why the co-pilot's unseen face drives women wild with passion: although he looks quite ugly, he has a $1000 bill between his teeth.

== Legacy ==
In 1940 it was the favourite comic strip of American children.

Smilin' Jack was influential in the expansion of NASCAR racing. NASCAR founder Bill France Sr. was Mosley's friend, so information about NASCAR's first "Strictly Stock" (now NASCAR Cup Series) race was written into the strip. After drivers throughout the United States, including race winner Jim Roper, read the strip, they drove across the country to race.

Jill Mosley, the artist's daughter, maintains an official Smilin' Jack website.

== See also ==
- List of film serials
