= Zack Mosley =

American cartoonist (1906-1993)

- Bob Mosley and Zack Mosley (right) worked together on The Adventures of Smilin' Jack in the post-WWII years.
- Born: Zack Terrell Mosley; December 12, 1906 Hickory, Oklahoma
- Died: December 21, 1993 (aged 87) Stuart, Florida
- Area: Cartoonist
- Notable works: The Adventures of Smilin' Jack

Zack Terrell Mosley (December 12, 1906 - December 21, 1993) was an American comic strip artist best known for the aviation adventures in his long-running The Adventures of Smilin' Jack which ran in more than 300 newspapers from 1933 to 1973.

== Biography ==
Mosley was born in Hickory, Oklahoma, but his family moved to Pottawatomie County. They lived first in Tecumseh and later moved to Shawnee, where Zack, then going by his middle name, Terrell, graduated from Shawnee High School in 1925. He was active in student affairs, including serving as treasurer of his class. His abilities as a cartoonist showed up at this early age, and some of his work is in the school annual. His family then moved to Oklahoma City, and he worked for a while as a retail clerk before leaving to attend the Chicago Academy of Fine Arts and the Chicago Art Institute, where he assisted Dick Calkins on Buck Rogers and Skyroads. The Encyclopedia of American Comics noted:

His love for airplanes went back to his childhood in Oklahoma, where he was born the year before that Indian Territory became a state. The sight of a plane that crashed there when he was seven years old so seized his imagination that he never lost his fascination, and when an Army "Jenny" landed nearby four years later, he began the habit of sketching planes that was to continue throughout his professional life. At the age of 20, he took his savings and enrolled at the Chicago Academy of Fine Arts. Three years at the Art Institute of Chicago prepared him to get a job, along with his roommate Russell Keaton, assisting cartoonist Dick Calkins with Buck Rogers and Skyroads, the pioneer aviation strip. In time, he and Keaton came to do most of the drawing of Skyroads, and Mosley began to write some of the episodes.

=== Comic strips ===
Mosley, who started taking flying lessons in 1932, launched his aviation Sunday page about a trio of flying students, On the Wing, on October 1, 1933. After the Chicago Tribune-New York News Syndicate changed the title to The Adventures of Smilin' Jack on December 31, 1933, it ran as both a daily and a Sunday strip for four decades. Comics historian Ron Goulart commented on the success of The Adventures of Smilin' Jack:

It was the most popular aviation adventure strip in the country in the 1930s and 1940s. This was a time when flying was literally by the seat of the pants. There was a romance to aviation, and Mr. Mosley got in on that.

In July 1934, Mosley began producing the weekly Bob Steele, Ph.G. strip for Drug Topics, a pharmacy trade journal. In August 1934, Mosley retitled the strip Betty Brown, Ph.G., and he began producing it under the pseudonym Cliff Terrell once his Smilin' Jack syndicate insisted he stop signing his name to other work.

=== World War II ===
Mosley, who also designed posters, insignias and program covers for flying events, became a licensed pilot on November 13, 1936. He owned nine airplanes, logging over 3000 hours at the controls, and flew on Civil Air Patrol anti-submarine flights during World War II. Zack's younger brother, Robert L. Mosley, flew World War II Air Force combat missions in the Pacific, and after the war he became Zack's assistant on The Adventures of Smilin' Jack for five years while the two were living in Stuart, Florida. Boody Rogers was another assistant on the strip.

Zack Mosley was 87 when he died of a heart attack December 21, 1993, at Martin Memorial Medical Center in Stuart, Florida.

In May 1948, Mosley was the first civilian recipient of the Naval Air Reserve certificate of merit, for boosting air-mindedness and civil defense through his strip.

Mosley was inducted into the Oklahoma Cartoonists Hall of Fame in Pauls Valley, Oklahoma, by Michael Vance. The Oklahoma Cartoonists Collection, created by Vance, is located in the Toy and Action Figure Museum.
