= Bentley, Kansas =

City in Sedgwick County, Kansas

- City
- Location within Sedgwick County and Kansas

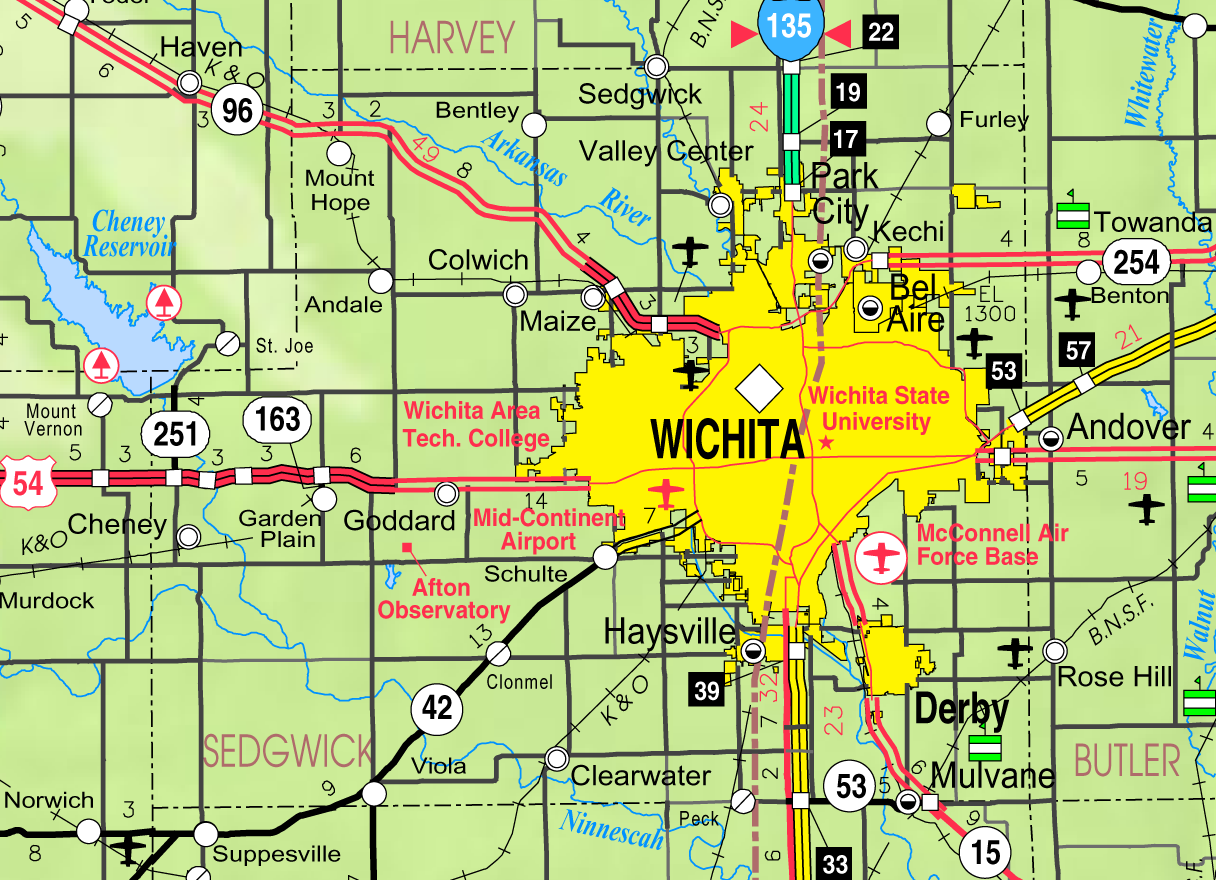
- KDOT map of Sedgwick County (legend)
- Coordinates: 37°53′11″N 97°31′2″W
- Country: United States
- State: Kansas
- County: Sedgwick
- Founded: 1888
- Incorporated: 1959
- Named for: O.H. Bentley

Area
  - Total: 0.31 sq mi (0.79 km^{2})
  - Land: 0.31 sq mi (0.79 km^{2})
  - Water: 0 sq mi (0.00 km^{2})
- Elevation: 1,388 ft (423 m)

Population (2020)
  - Total: 560
  - Density: 1,800/sq mi (710/km^{2})
- Time zone: UTC-6 (CST)
  - Summer (DST): UTC-5 (CDT)
- ZIP Code: 67016
- Area code: 316
- FIPS code: 20-06125
- GNIS ID: 473672
- Website: bentleyks.gov

Bentley is a city in Sedgwick County, Kansas, United States. As of the 2020 census, the population of the city was 560. It is located northwest of Wichita, approximately four miles north of K-96 highway at the intersection of 151st W and 109th N.

== History ==
In 1887, the Kansas Midland Railway was built from Wichita to Ellsworth, a distance of 107 miles, and the building of this line bisected Eagle Township and established a depot and town on section 11, Eagle Township. The line was purchased outright by The Frisco on October 1, 1900. The Frisco was merged into the Burlington Northern Railroad in 1980, later it abandoned the line in 1994.

Bentley was laid out in 1888. It is named in honor of the city's founder Orsemus Hills Bentley, a railroad official from Wichita.

The first post office in Bentley was established in March 1888.

== Geography ==
According to the United States Census Bureau, the city has a total area of 0.30 square miles (0.78 km^{2}), all land.

== Demographics ==
Historical population
Census	Pop.	Note	%±
1960	204		—
1970	260		27.5%
1980	311		19.6%
1990	360		15.8%
2000	368		2.2%
2010	530		44.0%
2020	560		5.7%
U.S. Decennial Census

=== 2020 census ===
The 2020 United States census counted 560 people, 205 households, and 154 families in Bentley. The population density was 1,842.1 per square mile (711.2/km^{2}). There were 217 housing units at an average density of 713.8 per square mile (275.6/km^{2}). The racial makeup was 86.07% (482) white or European American (84.46% non-Hispanic white), 0.71% (4) black or African-American, 1.43% (8) Native American or Alaska Native, 0.0% (0) Asian, 0.18% (1) Pacific Islander or Native Hawaiian, 4.64% (26) from other races, and 6.96% (39) from two or more races. Hispanic or Latino of any race was 7.5% (42) of the population.

Of the 205 households, 41.5% had children under the age of 18; 61.0% were married couples living together; 14.6% had a female householder with no spouse or partner present. 21.0% of households consisted of individuals and 9.3% had someone living alone who was 65 years of age or older. The average household size was 2.9 and the average family size was 3.2. The percent of those with a bachelor's degree or higher was estimated to be 12.0% of the population.

27.5% of the population was under the age of 18, 5.9% from 18 to 24, 29.3% from 25 to 44, 23.0% from 45 to 64, and 14.3% who were 65 years of age or older. The median age was 35.8 years. For every 100 females, there were 94.4 males. For every 100 females ages 18 and older, there were 89.7 males.

The 2016–2020 5-year American Community Survey estimates show that the median household income was $48,750 (with a margin of error of +/- $13,891) and the median family income was $56,250 (+/- $18,300). Males had a median income of $46,528 (+/- $7,162) versus $17,083 (+/- $6,924) for females. The median income for those above 16 years old was $24,028 (+/- $10,262). Approximately, 7.9% of families and 15.2% of the population were below the poverty line, including 15.8% of those under the age of 18 and 5.1% of those ages 65 or over.

=== 2010 census ===
As of the census of 2010, there were 530 people, 199 households, and 142 families residing in the city. The population density was 1,766.7 inhabitants per square mile (682.1/km^{2}). There were 221 housing units at an average density of 736.7 per square mile (284.4/km^{2}). The racial makeup of the city was 92.1% White, 0.9% African American, 3.0% Native American, 0.8% Asian, 2.1% from other races, and 1.1% from two or more races. Hispanic or Latino of any race were 7.2% of the population.

There were 199 households, of which 38.2% had children under the age of 18 living with them, 59.3% were married couples living together, 8.5% had a female householder with no husband present, 3.5% had a male householder with no wife present, and 28.6% were non-families. 24.1% of all households were made up of individuals, and 6% had someone living alone who was 65 years of age or older. The average household size was 2.66 and the average family size was 3.16.

The median age in the city was 35.2 years. 27.7% of residents were under the age of 18; 7.2% were between the ages of 18 and 24; 28.1% were from 25 to 44; 27.6% were from 45 to 64; and 9.4% were 65 years of age or older. The gender makeup of the city was 53.2% male and 46.8% female.

== Government ==
The Bentley government consists of a mayor and five council members.

== Education ==
The community is served by Halstead–Bentley USD 440 public school district.
