= Dougherty, Oklahoma =

- Town
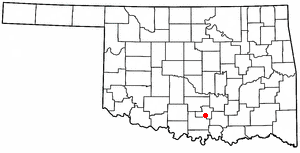
- Location in Oklahoma
- Coordinates: 34°24′02″N 97°03′05″W
- Country: United States
- State: Oklahoma
- County: Murray

Area
  - Total: 0.38 sq mi (0.98 km^{2})
  - Land: 0.38 sq mi (0.98 km^{2})
  - Water: 0 sq mi (0.00 km^{2})
- Elevation: 771 ft (235 m)

Population (2020)
  - Total: 199
  - Density: 523.6/sq mi (202.17/km^{2})
- Time zone: UTC-6 (Central (CST))
  - Summer (DST): UTC-5 (CDT)
- ZIP code: 73032
- Area code: 580
- FIPS code: 40-21200
- GNIS feature ID: 2412443

Dougherty is a town in Murray County, Oklahoma, United States. The population was 199 as of the 2020 Census.

== History ==
The community was first known as "Henderson Flat". On September 3, 1887, a post office was established here and called Dougherty, Indian Territory. The post office took its new name from banker William Dougherty of Gainesville, Texas. At the time of its founding, Henderson Flat, later Dougherty, was located in Pickens County, Chickasaw Nation.

As of 1900, Dougherty was a sundown town where African Americans were not allowed to live and could only visit on business in daylight.

== Geography ==
Dougherty is in southern Murray County, about 10 miles (16 km) by road south-southeast of Davis and 15 miles (24 km) southwest of Sulphur, the Murray county seat. It is in the valley of the Washita River, just upstream of the mouth of its tributary, Rock Creek, the outflow from the Lake of the Arbuckles 3 miles (5 km) to the northeast.

According to the U.S. Census Bureau, the town has a total area of 0.4 square miles (1.0 km^{2}), all land.

== Demographics ==
Historical population
Census	Pop.	Note	%±
1900	437		—
1910	278		−36.4%
1920	405		45.7%
1930	371		−8.4%
1940	464		25.1%
1950	341		−26.5%
1960	294		−13.8%
1970	211		−28.2%
1980	210		−0.5%
1990	138		−34.3%
2000	224		62.3%
2010	215		−4.0%
2020	199		−7.4%
U.S. Decennial Census

=== 2020 census ===
As of the 2020 census, Dougherty had a population of 199. The median age was 34.8 years. 26.6% of residents were under the age of 18 and 14.6% of residents were 65 years of age or older. For every 100 females there were 116.3 males, and for every 100 females age 18 and over there were 121.2 males age 18 and over.

0.0% of residents lived in urban areas, while 100.0% lived in rural areas.

There were 66 households in Dougherty, of which 30.3% had children under the age of 18 living in them. Of all households, 37.9% were married-couple households, 27.3% were households with a male householder and no spouse or partner present, and 25.8% were households with a female householder and no spouse or partner present. About 25.8% of all households were made up of individuals and 9.0% had someone living alone who was 65 years of age or older.

There were 92 housing units, of which 28.3% were vacant. The homeowner vacancy rate was 3.5% and the rental vacancy rate was 17.6%.

Racial composition as of the 2020 census
Race	Number	Percent
White	134	67.3%
Black or African American	5	2.5%
American Indian and Alaska Native	34	17.1%
Asian	0	0.0%
Native Hawaiian and Other Pacific Islander	0	0.0%
Some other race	5	2.5%
Two or more races	21	10.6%
Hispanic or Latino (of any race)	10	5.0%

=== 2000 census ===
As of the census of 2000, there were 224 people, 96 households, and 60 families residing in the town. The population density was 589.9 inhabitants per square mile (227.8/km^{2}). There were 115 housing units at an average density of 302.8 per square mile (116.9/km^{2}). The racial makeup of the town was 79.02% White, 0.45% African American, 13.84% Native American, 3.57% from other races, and 3.12% from two or more races. Hispanic or Latino of any race were 3.57% of the population. It is one of the smallest towns in the state.

There were 96 households, out of which 31.3% had children under the age of 18 living with them, 50.0% were married couples living together, 9.4% had a female householder with no husband present, and 36.5% were non-families. 33.3% of all households were made up of individuals, and 16.7% had someone living alone who was 65 years of age or older. The average household size was 2.33 and the average family size was 2.97.

In the town, the population was spread out, with 22.3% under the age of 18, 8.5% from 18 to 24, 30.8% from 25 to 44, 24.1% from 45 to 64, and 14.3% who were 65 years of age or older. The median age was 38 years. For every 100 females, there were 109.3 males. For every 100 females age 18 and over, there were 109.6 males.

The median income for a household in the town was $23,000, and the median income for a family was $33,125. Males had a median income of $16,042 versus $16,875 for females. The per capita income for the town was $14,490. About 13.2% of families and 20.1% of the population were below the poverty line, including 26.5% of those under the age of eighteen and 30.6% of those 65 or over.

== Education ==
The school district is Davis Public Schools.

== Notable person ==
- Kay Starr, singer, was born in Dougherty.

== See also ==
- List of sundown towns in the United States
