= Roff, Oklahoma =

- Town
- Nickname: Roff IT
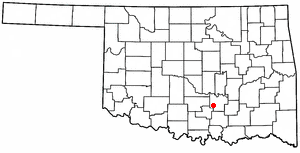
- Location of Roff, Oklahoma
- Coordinates: 34°37′36″N 96°50′28.5″W
- Country: United States
- State: Oklahoma
- County: Pontotoc

Area
  - Total: 0.93 sq mi (2.40 km^{2})
  - Land: 0.92 sq mi (2.39 km^{2})
  - Water: 0.0039 sq mi (0.01 km^{2})
- Elevation: 1,253 ft (382 m)

Population (2020)
  - Total: 632
  - Density: 685.2/sq mi (264.56/km^{2})
- Time zone: UTC-6 (Central (CST))
  - Summer (DST): UTC-5 (CDT)
- ZIP code: 74865
- Area code: 580
- FIPS code: 40-63750
- GNIS feature ID: 2412569

Roff is a town in Pontotoc County, Oklahoma, United States. As of the 2020 census, Roff had a population of 632.

== History ==
An incorporated community in Pontotoc County, Roff is situated along State Highway 1, eighteen miles southwest of Ada and ninety-five miles southeast of Oklahoma City. The town was named for Joseph T. Roff, a rancher who moved from Texas to the Chickasaw Nation, Indian Territory, in 1871. Roff and his Choctaw wife and children settled near the present townsite in 1883. A community developed along the nearby Blue River soon after Roff began leasing his land to whites in 1885. A subscription school was established there in 1889 and a post office, designated Roff, opened in June 1890. Joseph Roff served as postmaster.

The St. Louis, Oklahoma and Southern Railway (purchased by the St. Louis–San Francisco Railway in 1901) was constructed just south of Roff in December 1900. As a result, the village was relocated along the line and surveyed the following spring. A townsite company was then organized and community lots were sold. Joseph Roff was the town's first mayor.

Roff thrived as an agricultural community. Cotton gins, flour mills, and grain stores operated in town, and area farmers raised cotton, cattle, hogs, horses, and a variety of fruits. Other early businesses included a bottling works, a brick plant, and bakeries. The Mid-Continent Glass Sand Company was organized in 1912. Used in the manufacture of jars, tableware glasses, and containers, silicon dioxide (glass sand) remained a local export into the twenty-first century. The Roff Tribune, the Roff Enterprise, the Roff Eagle, and the Blue Valley Farmer were among the town's newspapers.

Roff's population was 1,079 at 1907 statehood. That number peaked at 1,138 in 1920. Roff's decline began when crop prices fell during the 1920s and continued through the Great Depression and World War II. The First State Bank of Roff closed in 1934, leaving the community without a bank until the 1970s. Local rail passenger service ceased in 1960.

Roff had 734 residents and fifteen commercial enterprises in 2000. Businesses included a restaurant, an automobile dealership, two gasoline stations with convenience stores, and a housing construction firm. In 2000 the Roff School District enrolled 330 students. The Roff National Guard Armory was listed in the National Register of Historic Places (NR 97001151).

== Geography ==
According to the United States Census Bureau, the town has a total area of 0.9 square miles (2.3 km^{2}), of which 0.9 square miles (2.3 km^{2}) is land and 1.06% is water.

== Demographics ==
Historical population
Census	Pop.	Note	%±
1910	1,044		—
1920	1,138		9.0%
1930	772		−32.2%
1940	705		−8.7%
1950	623		−11.6%
1960	638		2.4%
1970	632		−0.9%
1980	729		15.3%
1990	717		−1.6%
2000	734		2.4%
2010	725		−1.2%
2020	632		−12.8%
U.S. Decennial Census

=== 2020 census ===
As of the 2020 census, Roff had a population of 632. The median age was 35.7 years. 29.3% of residents were under the age of 18 and 16.6% of residents were 65 years of age or older. For every 100 females there were 98.1 males, and for every 100 females age 18 and over there were 97.8 males age 18 and over.

0.0% of residents lived in urban areas, while 100.0% lived in rural areas.

There were 261 households in Roff, of which 46.0% had children under the age of 18 living in them. Of all households, 49.8% were married-couple households, 18.0% were households with a male householder and no spouse or partner present, and 23.8% were households with a female householder and no spouse or partner present. About 24.5% of all households were made up of individuals and 14.1% had someone living alone who was 65 years of age or older.

There were 289 housing units, of which 9.7% were vacant. The homeowner vacancy rate was 0.0% and the rental vacancy rate was 19.5%.

Racial composition as of the 2020 census
Race	Number	Percent
White	469	74.2%
Black or African American	2	0.3%
American Indian and Alaska Native	87	13.8%
Asian	0	0.0%
Native Hawaiian and Other Pacific Islander	0	0.0%
Some other race	10	1.6%
Two or more races	64	10.1%
Hispanic or Latino (of any race)	25	4.0%

=== 2000 census ===
As of the census of 2000, there were 734 people, 287 households, and 206 families residing in the town. The population density was 782.8 inhabitants per square mile (302.2/km^{2}). There were 328 housing units at an average density of 349.8 per square mile (135.1/km^{2}). The racial makeup of the town was 86.10% White, 0.14% African American, 10.35% Native American, 0.14% from other races, and 3.27% from two or more races. Hispanic or Latino of any race were 0.54% of the population.

There were 287 households, out of which 35.9% had children under the age of 18 living with them, 55.1% were married couples living together, 11.5% had a female householder with no husband present, and 28.2% were non-families. 26.5% of all households were made up of individuals, and 15.7% had someone living alone who was 65 years of age or older. The average household size was 2.56 and the average family size was 3.08.

In the town, the population was spread out, with 27.4% under the age of 18, 9.3% from 18 to 24, 27.5% from 25 to 44, 19.9% from 45 to 64, and 15.9% who were 65 years of age or older. The median age was 36 years. For every 100 females, there were 97.3 males. For every 100 females age 18 and over, there were 90.4 males.

The median income for a household in the town was $21,576, and the median income for a family was $30,156. Males had a median income of $30,125 versus $15,250 for females. The per capita income for the town was $12,157. About 19.0% of families and 18.8% of the population were below the poverty line, including 26.3% of those under age 18 and 7.9% of those age 65 or over.

== Education ==
It is within the Roff Public Schools school district.
