= Sulphur Springs Railway =

Overview
- Locale: Oklahoma
- Dates of operation: 1902–1907

Technical
- Track gauge: 4 ft 8 1/2 in (1,435 mm)
- Length: 9 mi (14 km)

The Sulphur Springs Railway was a shortline railroad in Oklahoma branching off the trackage of the St. Louis-San Francisco Railway (Frisco), intended to bring tourists to what was then the federal government's Sulphur Springs Reservation, which would later become a national park. The railroad was completed about 1903, and the trackage was purchased by the Frisco in 1907.

== History ==
The strong-smelling mineral spring water in an area of Murray County, Oklahoma was believed by various Native American people to have healing power. When developers descended on the area, the Chickasaw and Choctaw appealed to the federal government to preserve access for everyone. The government purchased 640 acres in 1902, later expanding its holdings to 858 acres. The initial name for the site was the Sulphur Springs Reservation, which in 1906 Congress would re-designate as the Platt National Park. The park would later become, and remains, the Chickasaw National Recreation Area.

While the park was only in the planning stages, the issue of access was raised, and the Secretary of the Interior granted authority on October 11, 1900 to the nascent Sulphur Springs Railway to locate and survey a line from Hickory, Oklahoma via Sulphur, Oklahoma—this being the town in the immediate area of the park—to Davis, Oklahoma. Plans were submitted on February 18, 1901, but only the portion from Hickory to Sulphur was approved. The Sulphur Springs Railway Company was officially incorporated in April 1902, with plans to run the track from a point at Scullin Station south of Hickory on the Sapulpa, Oklahoma-to-Denison, Texas line of the Frisco, on to Sulphur. That line, about 9 miles in length, was started in the Fall of 1902 and was completed in the late Spring of 1903.

The line was sold to the Frisco on July 18, 1907. In its later years, the trackage was used to haul generating equipment, livestock feed, and fuel to the Sulphur area. The line was removed in the 1970’s.

This railroad is not to be confused with the Mandeville and Sulphur Springs Railroad, which became the New Orleans and Northeastern Railroad and operated in Louisiana and Mississippi.
