= Treasure Valley Casino =

Casino in Davis, Oklahoma

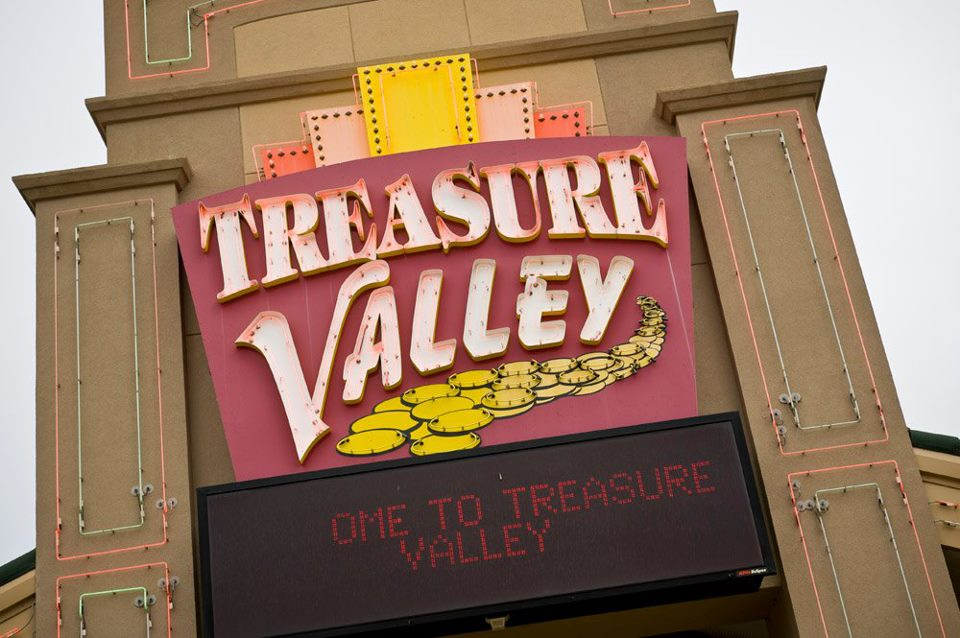
- Interactive map of Treasure Valley Casino
- Location: Davis, Oklahoma; 12252 Ruppe Rd, Davis, OK 73030; 34°30′32″N 97°10′19″W
- Opened: July 2003
- No. of rooms: 59
- Gaming space: 19,666 sq ft (1,827.0 m^{2})
- Notable restaurants: Main Street Restaurant, The Cove
- Casino type: Land-based
- Owner: Chickasaw Nation of Oklahoma
- Website: https://www.treasurevalleycasino.com/

Treasure Valley is a Native American casino located in the Arbuckle Mountains of Davis, Oklahoma in the south-central part of the state. Owned and operated by the Chickasaw Nation, the gaming center was opened in July 2003. The Inn at Treasure Valley is a 59-room hotel has an indoor swimming pool and jacuzzi, continental breakfast, exercise room and dry sauna, as well as four conference rooms. Overlooking the Washita River Valley and located along Interstate-35 and Highway 7 at Exit 55, the 19,666 sq ft (1,827.0 m^{2}) Treasure Valley Casino is near several other key attractions in the area. It is 5.5 miles from Turner Falls and the Arbuckle Wilderness Exotic Animal Theme Park, and 13 miles from the Chickasaw Cultural Center. Treasure Valley is approximately 55 miles south of Norman, Oklahoma which is home to the Nation's sister gaming facility, Riverwind Casino, and 50 miles north of WinStar World Casino in Thackerville, Oklahoma.

== Games ==
The gaming center draws more than 130,000 customers annually and has 400 gaming machines as well as tables for Blackjack, Ultimate Texas Hold ‘Em and 3-card Poker.

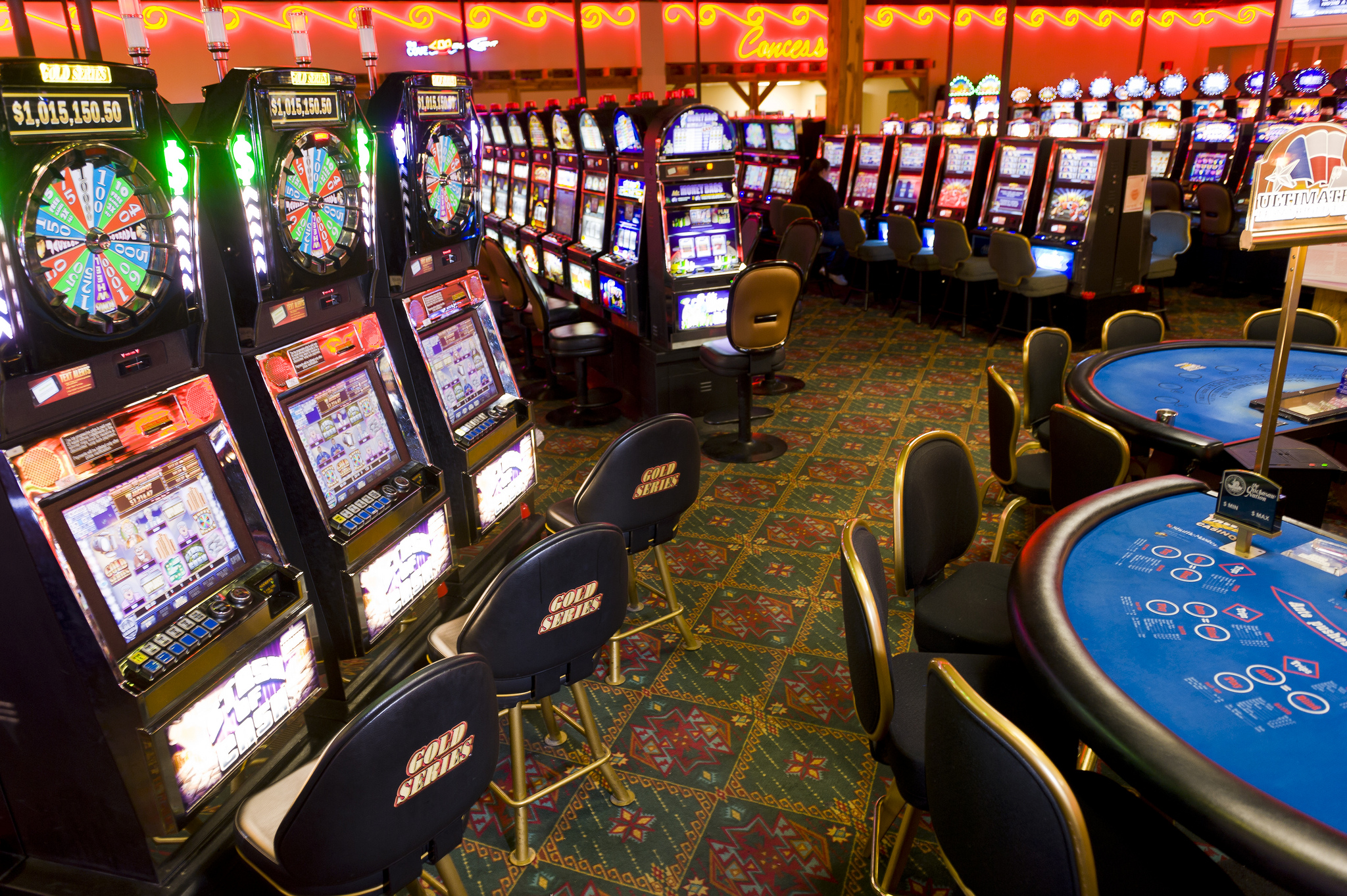
A view of the card tables inside the casino.

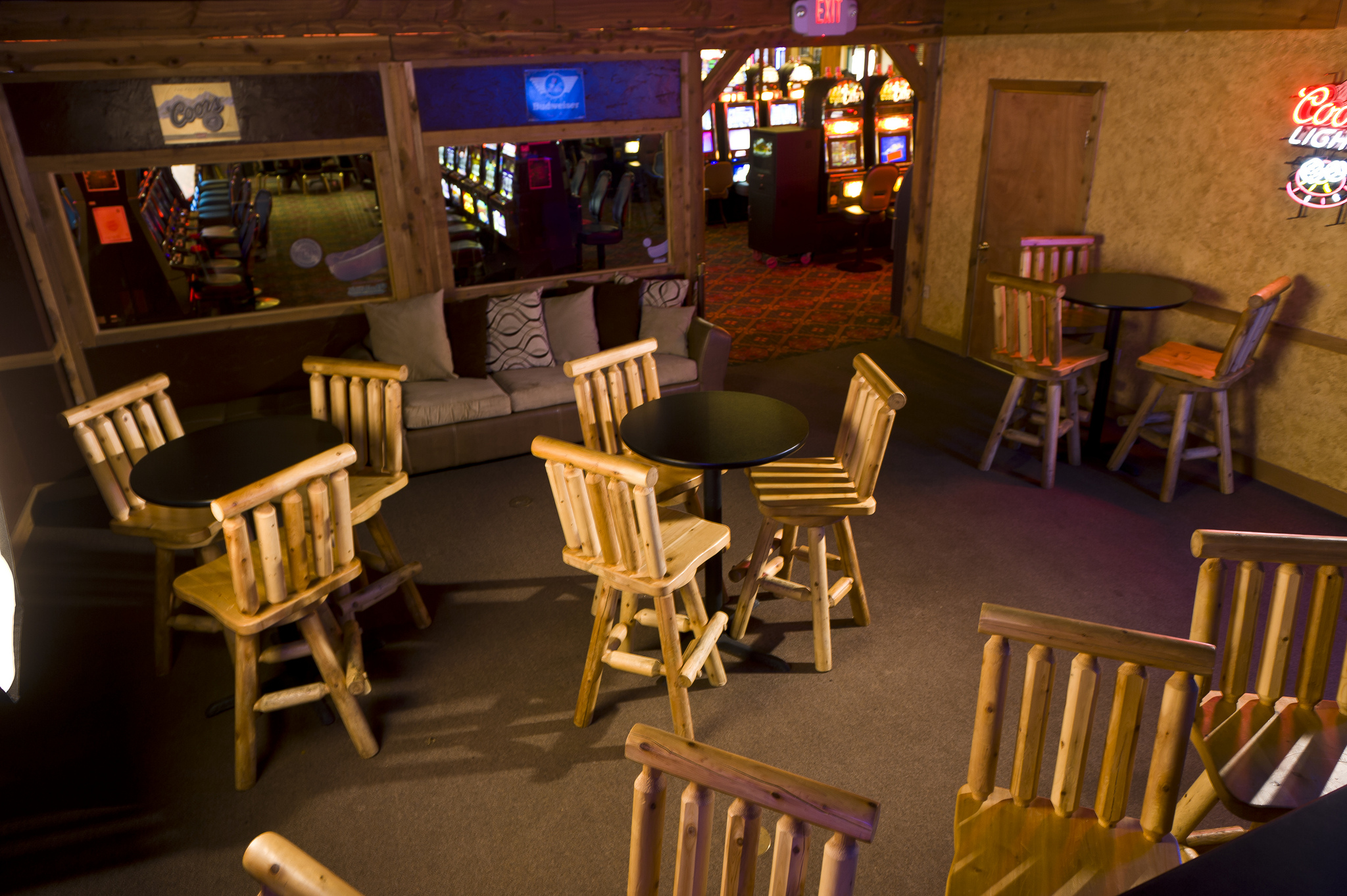
A view inside the casino.
