= Vernon M. Tanner =

American substitute teacher from South Carolina, U.S. (1947–2023)

- Tanner showcasing a flute during an educational presentation in 2019.
- Born: July 26, 1947; Johnsonville, South Carolina
- Died: July 18, 2023 (aged 75); Hemingway, South Carolina
- Other name: Mingo Big Bear Claw
- Citizenship: American
- Occupation: substitute teacher
- Years active: 1999-2023
- Known for: First Native American Commissioner for SCCMA

Vernon M. Tanner (July 26, 1947 – July 18, 2023), also known as Mingo Big Bear Claw, was a substitute teacher from South Carolina. Tanner was the leader of the Chaloklowa Chickasaw Indian People, a state-recognized group in South Carolina.

Tanner was honored in a congratulatory resolution by the South Carolina General Assembly in 2004 for his significant contributions to the state's Native American affairs, particularly for his role in the development of regulations for the recognition of Native American entities. This acknowledgment included his appointment as the first Native American Commissioner for the South Carolina Commission for Minority Affairs. However, this achievement was soon overshadowed by controversy when it was discovered that the Indigenous ancestry claimed by Tanner and the Chaloklowa Chickasaw was incorrect upon the SCCMA's rereview of the organization's petition for recognition as a state-recognized tribe.

Despite continued doubts and skepticism surrounding Tanner's Indigenous ancestry, he continued to serve on the SCCMA evaluating other Indigenous communities' petitions for state-recognition until 2018 and publicly claimed to be the last traditional medicine man within South Carolina for the remainder of his life. He continues to be considered the first Native American Indian Commissioner to the SCCMA and the Chaloklowa Chickasaw remain a state-recognized "group", being neither state nor federally recognized as a Native American tribe.

== Personal life ==
Vernon Malene Tanner was born on July 26, 1947, in Johnsonville, South Carolina, to Hermon and Pearline Altman Tanner. He maintained that he was of Chickasaw descent. He served in the National Guard for 36 years before retiring and later was employed as a substitute teacher and volunteered with the Johnsonville Fire Department.

== Chaloklowa Chickasaw ==
In 1999, Tanner established the Chaloklowa Chickasaw Indian People, a 501(c)(3) nonprofit organization focused on education, and remained its leader until his death in 2023. Tanner's leadership of the organization was marked by significant achievements, including securing a grant of $100,147.00 from the Administration for Native Americans (ANA) in 2002 for Social and Economic Development Strategies. In 2003, he spearheaded the organization's efforts to gain federal recognition as an Indian tribe through a petition to the US Department of the Interior Bureau of Indian Affairs. In 2005, Tanner played a pivotal role in achieving state recognition for the organization under South Carolina Code Section 1-31-40 (A) (7)(10), as per the Statutory Authority Chapter 139 (100-111), designating it as a "group" within the state's legal framework.

== Involvement with the SCCMA ==
Tanner played a key role in the early development of the South Carolina Commission for Minority Affairs. His involvement was particularly significant in the Native American Ad Hoc Committee, where he worked on developing criteria for the state recognition of Native American tribes, groups, and special interest organizations. His contributions were formally acknowledged by the South Carolina General Assembly through Concurrent Resolution S. 1279, introduced by former Senator Yancey McGill in 2004. This resolution recognized Tanner for his work in developing regulations for recognizing Native American entities and congratulated him on his historic appointment as the first Native American Indian Commissioner to the South Carolina Commission for Minority Affairs in modern history.

== Heritage Controversy ==
In late 2005, it came to light that the Indigenous ancestry claimed by Tanner and the Chaloklowa Chickasaw was incorrect upon rereview of the group's petition to be state-recognized as a Native American tribe. This revelation was unexpected, especially since then director of the SCCMA, Janie Davis, had previously praised the organization's petition as exemplary. This incident, occurring shortly after Tanner's historic appointment as the first "Native American Commissioner to the Board of the South Carolina Commission for Minority Affairs" by the state Senate, sparked widespread discussion and mistrust among Indigenous communities in South Carolina. The controversy particularly highlighted concerns regarding the SCCMA's recognition process and perceived inequities, as voiced through letters written by members of various local Indigenous groups. Shawne Hathaway, a representative from another community also seeking recognition, highlighted the significant inequity in the actions of the state, stating that while the Senate appointed Tanner as the first-ever Native American Commissioner to the SCCMA, the SCCMA disavowed Tanner's Indigenous heritage following an investigative review. Tanner's Indigenous heritage had previously been publicly called into question in 2003 by Keith Pounds, a Choctaw descendant, newspaper columnist, and then writer of "Redcopy", an internet newsletter for South Carolina's Indigenous communities.

The Chaloklowa Chickasaw's petition for state-recognition as a tribe was subsequently rejected, but the organization was later able to obtain status as a state-recognized "group".

== Other activities ==
Tanner was actively involved in educational outreach, giving presentations about Chickasaw culture and history to various groups including elementary and middle school students, civic organizations, churches, scout troops, YMCA groups, and local libraries. He played a key role in organizing annual field trips for students from Johnsonville Elementary School to Tanner Farms, where they learned about aspects of Chickasaw lifeways. These educational sessions often included traditional cooking methods, hands-on experiences with live animals, and time spent inside a tipi. In addition to these activities, Tanner, who claimed to be the last traditional medicine man in South Carolina, sometimes incorporated discussions of Indigenous spirituality into his presentations.

== Death ==
Tanner died at his home in Hemingway, South Carolina on July 18, 2023.

== See also ==
- Native American identity in the United States
- Pretendian
- Plastic Shaman
- Red Thunder Cloud
- Chaloklowa Chickasaw
