= National Register of Historic Places listings in Murray County, Oklahoma =

Location of Murray County in Oklahoma

This is a list of the National Register of Historic Places listings in Murray County, Oklahoma.

This is intended to be a complete list of the properties and districts on the National Register of Historic Places in Murray County, Oklahoma, United States. The locations of National Register properties and districts for which the latitude and longitude coordinates are included below, may be seen in a map.

There are 8 properties and districts listed on the National Register in the county, including one National Historic Landmark.

This National Park Service list is complete through NPS recent listings posted March 21, 2025.

== Current listings ==
| | Name on the Register | Image | Date listed | Location | City or town | Description |
|---|---|---|---|---|---|---|
| 1 | Davis Santa Fe Depot | Davis Santa Fe Depot | December 29, 1994 (#94001507) | 12 Main St. 34°30′12″N 97°07′18″W | Davis | |
| 2 | Historic Downtown Sulphur Commercial District | Historic Downtown Sulphur Commercial District | June 14, 2001 (#01000662) | West Muskogee St. from W. 1st St. to W. 5th St., and W. 5th St. 34°30′27″N 96°58′17″W | Sulphur | |
| 3 | Initial Point | | October 6, 1970 (#70000533) | About 7.5 miles west of Davis on the Garvin/Murray county line 34°30′24″N 97°14′49″W | Davis | Extends into Garvin County |
| 4 | Lowrance Springs Site | | March 10, 1975 (#75001567) | Address Restricted | Sulphur | |
| 5 | Murray County Courthouse | Murray County Courthouse | August 23, 1984 (#84003352) | Wyandotte Ave. 34°30′17″N 96°58′29″W | Sulphur | |
| 6 | Platt National Park Historic District | Platt National Park Historic District | July 7, 2011 (#11000628) | OK 7 at US 177; 34°30′04″N 96°58′28″W | Sulphur | Historic Park Landscapes in National and State Parks MPS |
| 7 | Sulphur Armory | Sulphur Armory | May 20, 1994 (#94000487) | 500 W. Wynnewood Ave. 34°30′37″N 96°58′21″W | Sulphur | |
| 8 | Travertine Nature Center | Travertine Nature Center | January 25, 2011 (#10001180) | East of U.S. Route 177; 34°30′14″N 96°56′58″W | Sulphur vicinity | |

== See also ==
- List of National Historic Landmarks in Oklahoma
- National Register of Historic Places listings in Oklahoma
