= Davis, Oklahoma =

City in Oklahoma, US

- City
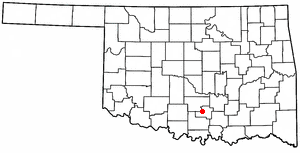
- Location in Oklahoma
- Coordinates: 34°30′17″N 97°06′31″W
- Country: United States
- State: Oklahoma
- Counties: Murray, Garvin

Area
  - Total: 9.28 sq mi (24.03 km^{2})
  - Land: 9.26 sq mi (23.98 km^{2})
  - Water: 0.019 sq mi (0.05 km^{2})
- Elevation: 1,148 ft (350 m)

Population (2020)
  - Total: 2,823
  - Density: 304.9/sq mi (117.72/km^{2})
- Time zone: UTC-6 (Central (CST))
  - Summer (DST): UTC-5 (CDT)
- ZIP Code: 73030
- Area code: 580
- FIPS code: 40-19450
- GNIS feature ID: 2410297
- Website: www.davisok.city

Davis is a city in Murray County in the U.S. state of Oklahoma. A small portion of the city extends into Garvin County. The population was 2,823 as of the 2020 census.

== History ==
Davis is named after Samuel H. Davis, who moved to Washita in what was then Indian Territory in 1887. At the time of its founding, the community was located in Pickens County, Chickasaw Nation.

Davis owned a dry goods store, which was 4 miles (6 km) south of the current town of Davis. Davis submitted a petition for a Santa Fe depot to be built near his store, and the petition was accepted. In 1890, he successfully petitioned for a post office to be built. The post office was supposed to be named after Nelson Chigley, a Chickasaw man who owned the land on which the town was to be built. Chigley was already an Indian Territory name, so it was named after Davis. The town was established on November 16, 1898.

By 1900, Davis had 57 businesses, two banks, ten doctors, three dentists, and three lawyers. Cotton farming was a common occupation in Davis, which was in one of the best cotton producing sections in Oklahoma.

By 2000, the population had grown to 2,610, and very few people worked as farmers. The education, health, and social services sectors of the economy have grown, with approximately one-quarter of the population working in these areas.

== Geography ==
Davis is in central Murray County, 23 miles (37 km) north of Ardmore and 19 miles (31 km) south of Pauls Valley. It is 8 miles (13 km) west of Sulphur, the Murray county seat, and 7 miles (11 km) northwest of the Lake of the Arbuckles.

The intersection of U.S. Route 77 and State Highway 7 is in the center of Davis. Interstate 35 passes 3 miles (5 km) west of the center of town. SH-7 east of Davis leads onto SH-7 Spur which, at the intersection with U.S. Route 177, feeds into the western end of the Chickasaw Turnpike.

According to the U.S. Census Bureau, the city of Davis has a total area of 9.30 square miles (24.09 km^{2}), of which 0.02 square miles (0.05 km^{2}), or 0.22%, are water. The city limits include a large area within the Arbuckle Mountains 5 miles (8 km) south of the downtown area that includes Turner Falls Park. Another offshoot of the city limits extends west along SH-7 to include the I-35 interchange and the Treasure Valley Casino in Garvin County. The Washita River, a tributary of the Red River, passes a mile west of the city center.

== Demographics ==
Historical population
Census	Pop.	Note	%±
1900	1,346		—
1910	1,416		5.2%
1920	1,609		13.6%
1930	1,705		6.0%
1940	1,698		−0.4%
1950	1,928		13.5%
1960	2,203		14.3%
1970	2,223		0.9%
1980	2,782		25.1%
1990	2,543		−8.6%
2000	2,610		2.6%
2010	2,683		2.8%
2020	2,823		5.2%
U.S. Decennial Census

=== 2020 census ===
As of the 2020 census, Davis had a population of 2,823. The median age was 36.9 years. 26.3% of residents were under the age of 18 and 17.5% of residents were 65 years of age or older. For every 100 females there were 90.6 males, and for every 100 females age 18 and over there were 87.6 males age 18 and over.

There were 1,108 households in Davis, of which 35.6% had children under the age of 18 living in them. Of all households, 39.1% were married-couple households, 20.1% were households with a male householder and no spouse or partner present, and 33.5% were households with a female householder and no spouse or partner present. About 31.2% of all households were made up of individuals and 13.9% had someone living alone who was 65 years of age or older.

There were 1,274 housing units, of which 13.0% were vacant. Among occupied housing units, 59.3% were owner-occupied and 40.7% were renter-occupied. The homeowner vacancy rate was 3.6% and the rental vacancy rate was 10.3%.

0% of residents lived in urban areas, while 100.0% lived in rural areas.

Racial composition as of the 2020 census
Race	Percent
White	68.6%
Black or African American	2.5%
American Indian and Alaska Native	14.6%
Asian	0.5%
Native Hawaiian and Other Pacific Islander	0.1%
Some other race	2.1%
Two or more races	11.7%
Hispanic or Latino (of any race)	7.2%

=== 2010 census ===
As of the 2010 census, there were 2,683 people, 1,042 households, and 723 families residing in the city.

The population density was 237.1 inhabitants per square mile (91.5/km^{2}). There were 1,202 housing units at an average density of 109.2 per square mile (42.2/km^{2}).

The racial makeup of the city was 80.34% White, 4.56% African American, 10.65% Native American, 0.38% Asian, 0.50% from other races, and 3.56% from two or more races. Hispanic or Latino of any race were 1.03% of the population.

There were 1,042 households, out of which 33.9% had children under the age of 18 living with them, 52.6% were married couples living together, 13.3% had a female householder with no husband present, and 30.6% were non-families. 28.0% of all households were made up of individuals, and 14.9% had someone living alone who was 65 years of age or older. The average household size was 2.45 and the average family size was 2.99.

In the city, the population was spread out, with 26.7% under the age of 18, 8.3% from 18 to 24, 24.8% from 25 to 44, 21.3% from 45 to 64, and 18.9% who were 65 years of age or older. The median age was 37 years. For every 100 females, there were 88.9 males. For every 100 females age 18 and over, there were 80.2 males.

The median income for a household in the city was $28,958, and the median income for a family was $37,100. Males had a median income of $27,266 versus $16,667 for females. The per capita income for the city was $13,604. About 13.0% of families and 14.2% of the population were below the poverty line, including 14.9% of those under age 18 and 12.5% of those age 65 or over.

== Arts and culture ==
The Davis Museum, run by the Arbuckle Historical Society, includes displays on schools, churches, music, medicine, dentistry, civic organizations, military, uniforms, fire departments, police departments, the railroad, farm implements, and photographs of the area. The museum is housed in the recently remodeled 1907 Santa Fe Depot, which is on the listed on the National Register of Historic Places.

== Parks and recreation ==
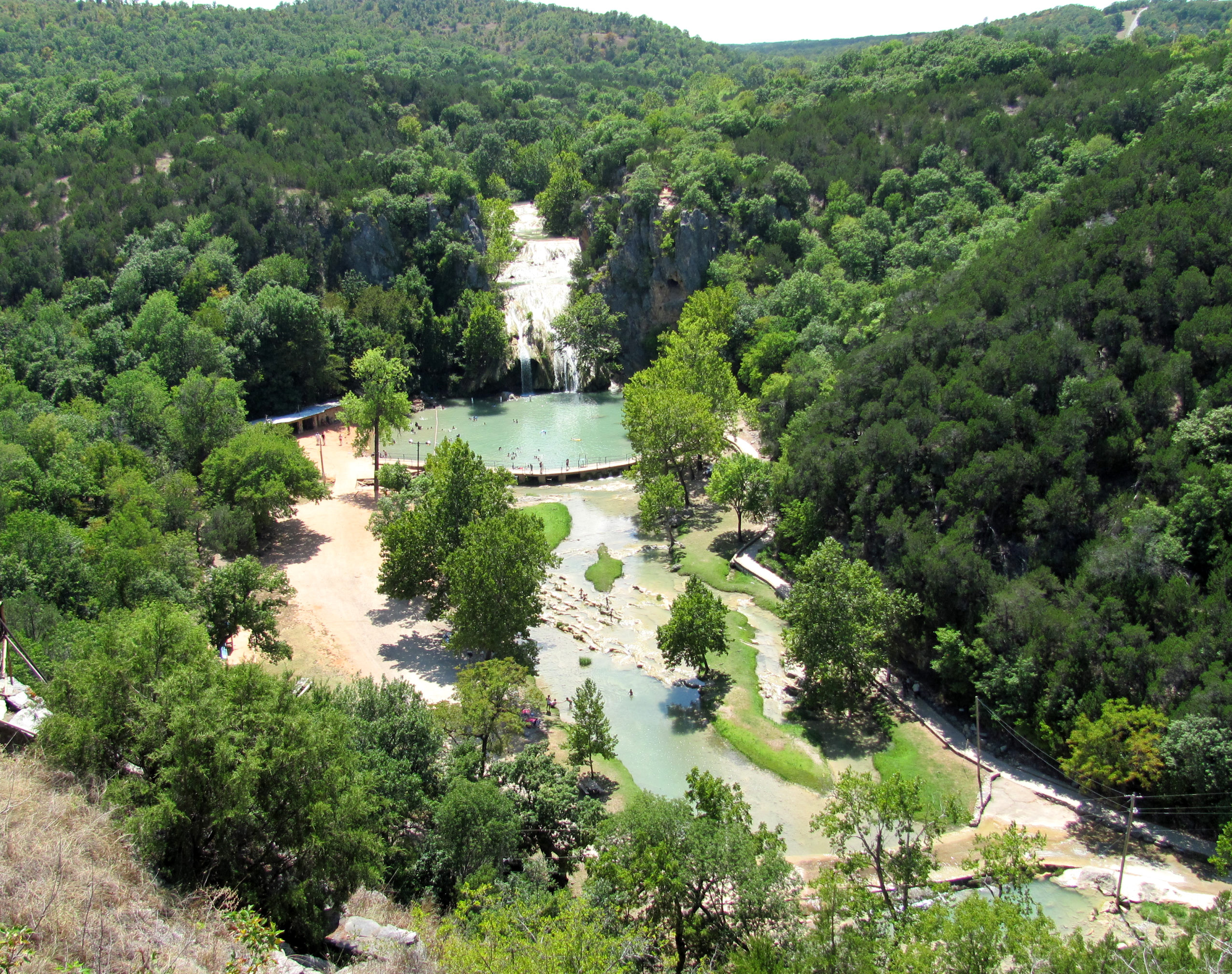
Turner Falls

Turner Falls Park in Davis, 5 miles (8 km) south of downtown, is home to one of Oklahoma's tallest waterfalls. The park, nearly 1,600 acres (650 ha), features swimming, hiking, exploring, overnight lodging, and more.

Davis also has a city park with walking trails, picnic areas, playground equipment, and pavilions.

Chickasaw National Recreation Area is approximately 9 miles (14 km) east of town, surrounding the Lake of the Arbuckles.

== Media ==
Davis and its surrounding counties are served by a weekly local newspaper, The Davis News.

== Education ==
The school district is Davis Public Schools.
