= Hiawatha Estes =

American architect

Hiawatha Thompson Estes (January 26, 1918 – May 8, 2003) was a California-based architect, author, and founder of the Nationwide House Plan Book Company. He was best known for designing a large number of variations of the ubiquitous post-war ranch home, mass marketing plans of them, and publishing a number of books dealing with residential architecture.

A Chickasaw Indian Nation member, in 2019 he was inducted posthumously into the Chickasaw Hall of Fame.

== Early life and education ==
He attended the University of Oklahoma.

== Career ==
He served in World War II as a captain in the Army Air Corps 37th Fighter Squadron.

After the war, Estes founded "Architectural House and Plan Business, Nationwide Plan Book", which was to evolve into Hiawatha Estes and Associates. Estes was a resident of Northridge, California, a neighborhood of Los Angeles, and remarkable for the number and diversity of ranch homes, some of which are Hiawatha Estes designs.

His most well-known book, Ranch and Country Homes, was published jointly with the Southern California Building Permit Service.

== Personal life ==
Estes was related to Senator Helen TeAta Cole, his cousin, also of Oklahoma. In 2019, his sons accepted his Chickasaw Hall of Fame Award on his behalf.

== Published books ==
- Homes by Hiawatha 1974
- Prize homes 1978, 1981 eds
- Ranch & modern homes 1978
