= The Davis News =

Weekly newspaper in Davis, Oklahoma, U.S.

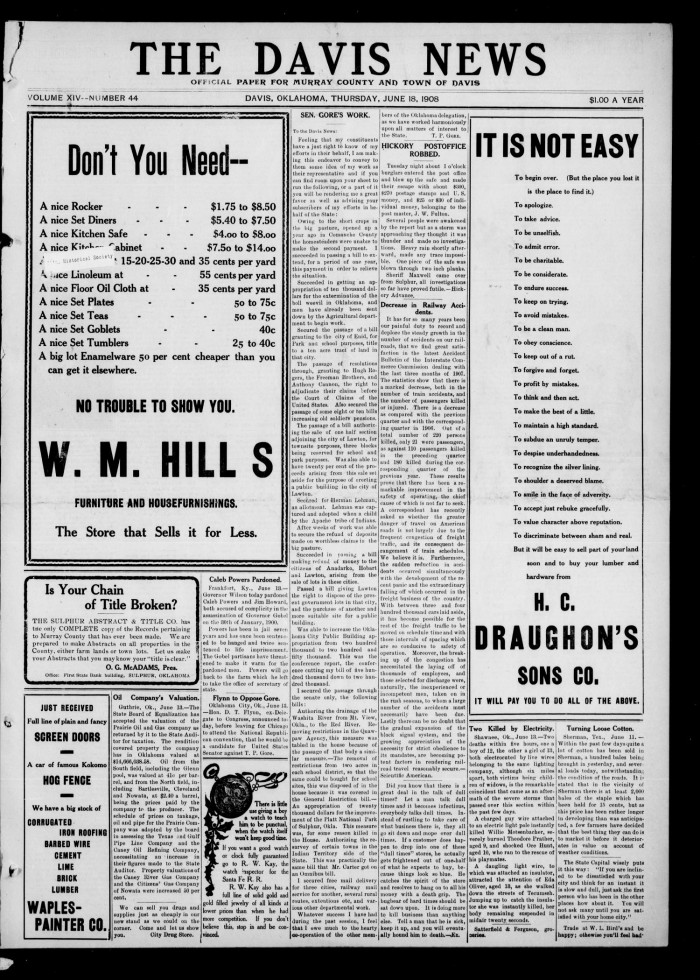
- Front Page of Davis News, June 18, 1908
- Type: Weekly newspaper
- Format: Broadsheet
- Owner(s): Thompson Times, LLC
- Publisher: Thompson Times, LLC
- Editor: Alisha Thompson
- Founded: 1894
- Ceased publication: 1903
- Language: English
- Headquarters: 440 E. Main, Davis, Oklahoma
- Circulation: 1,500
- OCLC number: 31726797
- Website: davisnewspaper.net

The Davis News is a weekly newspaper which currently serves Davis, Oklahoma, United States, and the surrounding area. Since its inception, the paper has had a mission of providing all of the local news to its local constituents.

== History ==
The newspaper was founded as The Davis Weekly News in 1894 by Fay L. Crossett. Crossett was editor of the Davis News for more than 50 years. Crossett sold the paper to Mr. and Mrs. Don Banzett in July 1952.

In June 1956, Mr. and Mrs. Robert Larson sold the Davis News to Thomas E. Dyson and Joe W. Taylor. Dyson left the paper four years later and Mr. Joe and Mrs. Margaret Taylor continued to publish after Dyson left.

After her husband died, Margaret Taylor continued to publish the paper until 1992, when she retired. She became the first female President of the Oklahoma Press Association. Margaret Taylor was later inducted into the Oklahoma Journalism Hall of Fame.

As of 2018, the Davis News had a circulation of 1,500. It is published on Wednesday under editor Alisha Thompson. It is owned by Thompson Times, LLC and is headquartered at 440 E. Main, Davis, Oklahoma.
