= Chickasaw Cultural Center =

Museum campus in Oklahoma, United States

Coordinates: 34°29′34″N 96°59′45″W

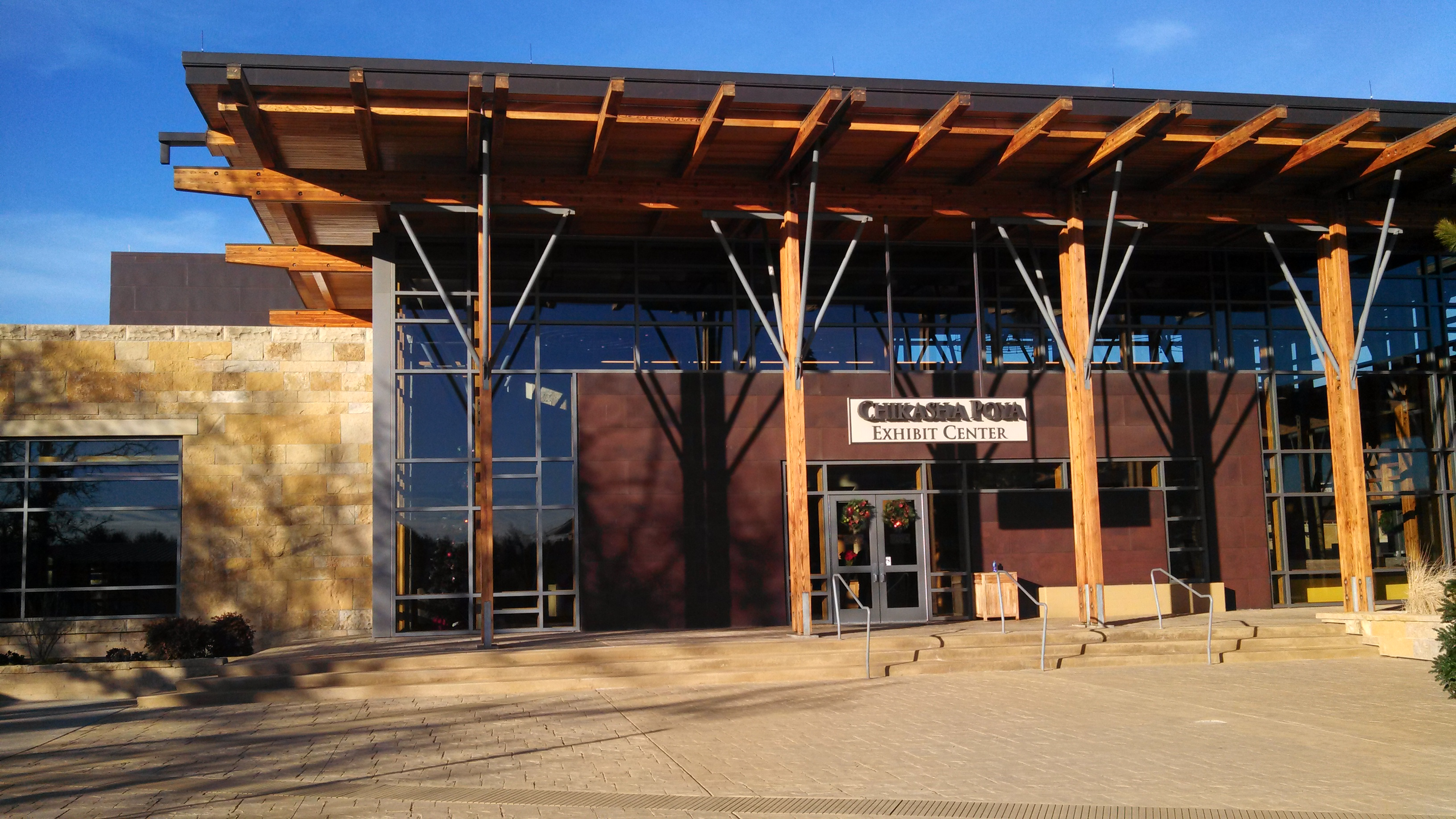
Chickasaw Cultural Center museum building

The Chickasaw Cultural Center is a campus located in Sulphur, Oklahoma, near the Chickasaw National Recreation Area. Its 184-acre (74 ha) campus is home to historical museum buildings with interactive exhibits on Chickasaw tribal history, traditional dancing, and Chickasaw language. The campus includes a historically accurate traditional tribal village recreated in the rear lot and a garden honoring members of the Chickasaw Nation Hall of Fame. It is one of two museum campuses presented by the Chickasaw Nation, the other being the First Americans Museum in downtown Oklahoma City, Oklahoma.

== History ==
In the 1960s, Chickasaw Nation Governor Bill Anoatubby decided something had to be built to preserve Chickasaw culture. The nation was not in a position to make that happen at the time, but in 1980 Price Waterhouse conducted a feasibility study to determine whether a Chickasaw/Native American theme park could be built in the Arbuckle area. The study concluded that there was not enough population in the area to support it. This was followed by a survey conducted by the Chickasaw government in October 2000, for over 1,200 members of the nation to provide suggestions regarding the creation of a cultural center.

U.S. Representative Tom Cole (a citizen of the Chickasaw Nation) drafted a land exchange agreement between the Nation, the City of Sulphur, and the National Park Service, which was approved on September 28, 2004, in order to provide a favorable location for the center's campus. The symbolic breaking of the ground of the center was started two days later on September 30, 2004.

Construction began shortly after in 2004, took six years to complete, cost $40 million, and opened in 2010.

== Campus ==
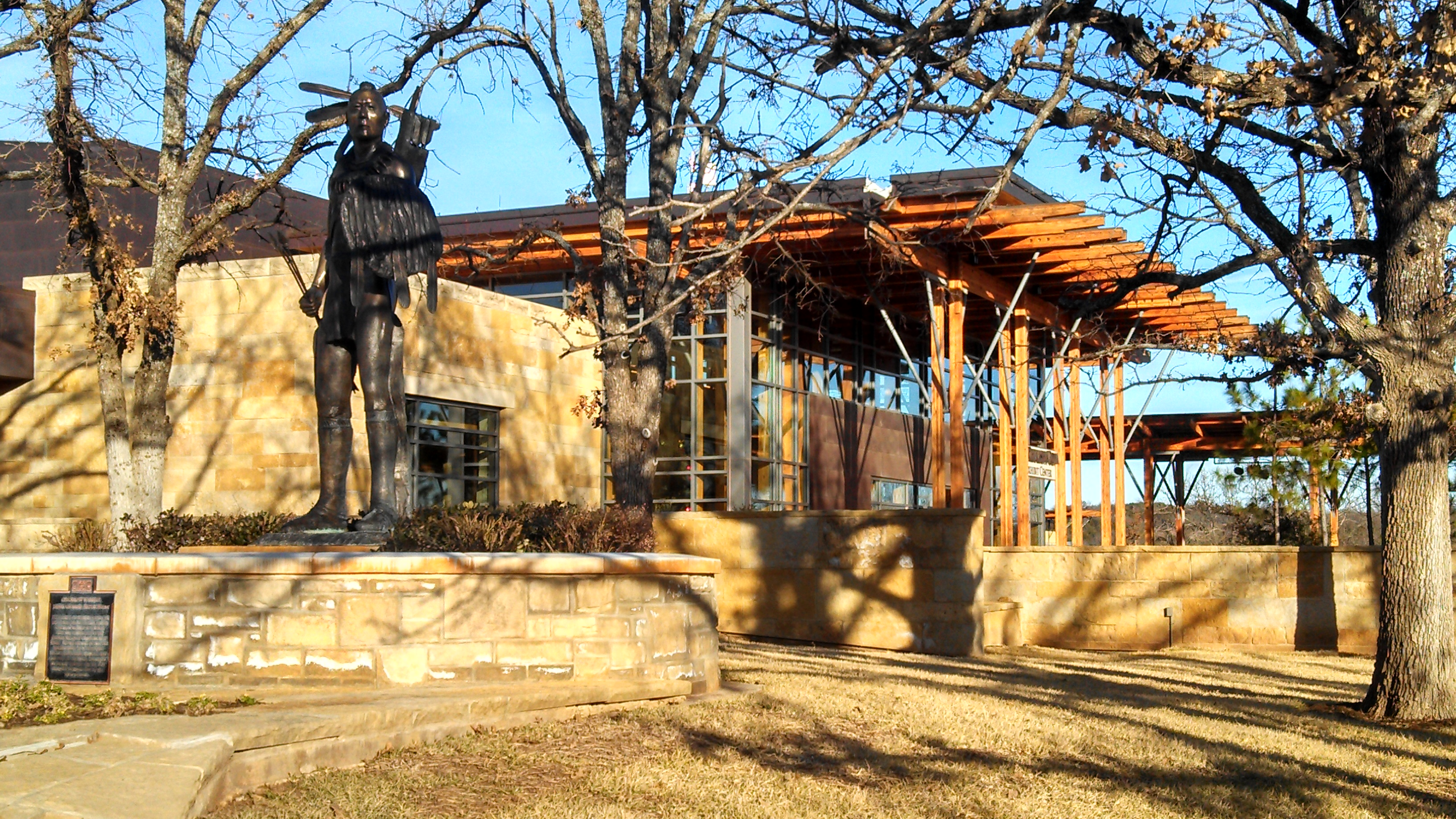
Chickasaw Cultural Center museum building, with a statue of a stylized Chickasaw warrior in the foreground

=== Exhibits ===
The Chickasaw Cultural Center features different seasonal exhibits, some of which are listed below.

- Through the Eyes of the Eagle - During Native American Heritage Month from November through December an exhibit focused on encouraging Chickasaw children to eat healthy and exercise is presented, based on a series of children's books developed by the CDC and the Tribal Leaders Diabetes Committee. The exhibit is bringing awareness to and helping solve the high rate of diabetes among Native children.
- Dynamic Chickasaw Woman Of The Year Award - A short presentation on the year's award winner of this award, created by Dr. Amanda Cobb-Greentham, and presented during Women's History Month.

=== Buildings ===
The buildings and other structures on the campus were designed by the architectural group Frankfurt Short Bruza (FSB) who have also done multiple other projects with the Chickasaw Nation.

- Chikasha Poya Exhibit Center - The main building on the campus which houses most of the indoor exhibits.
- The Holisso Research Center - the Cultural Center's building that holds a large collection of tribal archives and genealogical records of the Chickasaw people.
- Anoli’ Theater - the largest theater on the campus. It has a capacity of 350 people, and is used to show Native American films. It is one of the largest theaters in the state, with an IMAX grade 2,400 sq ft screen and 3 projectors.
- Spiritual Center - area for religious rituals instruction on religious aspects of Chickasaw natives.
- Sky Pavilion Visitor Center - houses information and a souvenir shop.

=== Outdoor elements ===
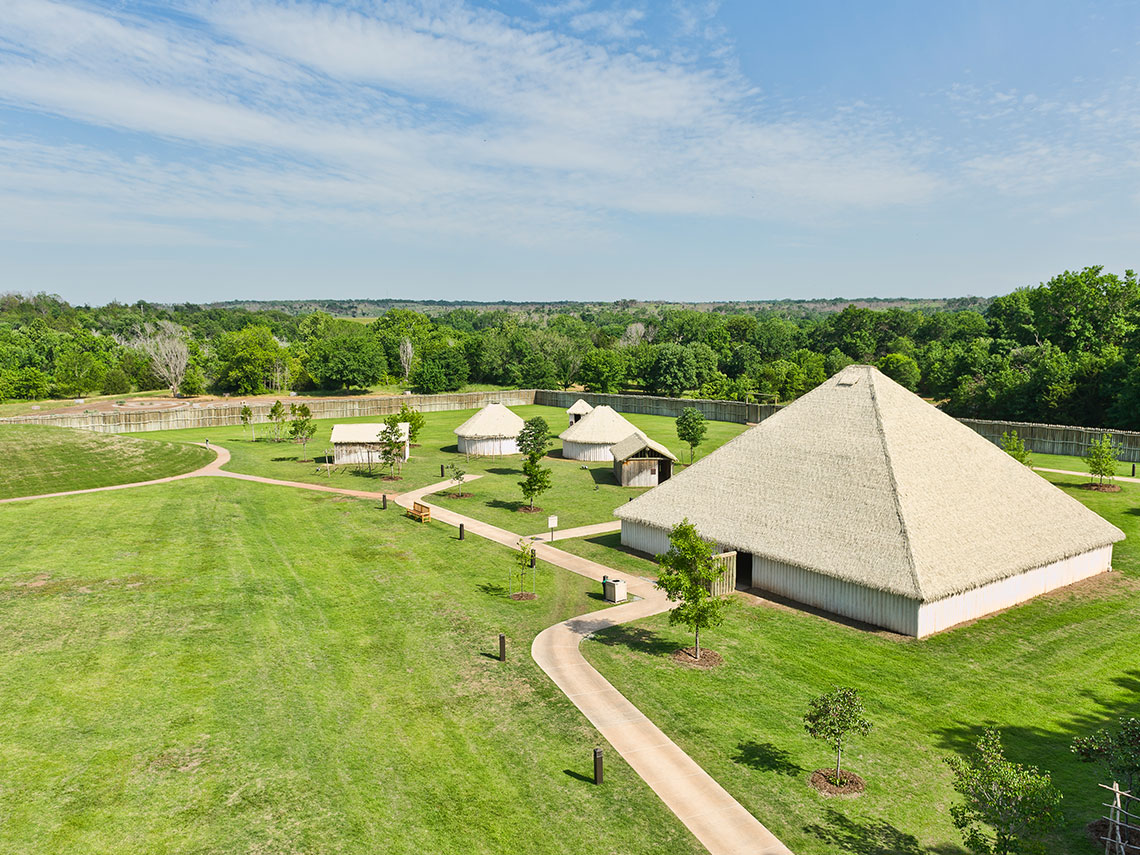
Recreation of Cultural Center village

One of the biggest features of the Cultural Center is the historically accurate recreation of a traditional Chickasaw village. The center hosts cultural re-enactments and daily Stomp dances in the village on the campus.

The campus also has an outdoor amphitheater, sky bridge overlooking the recreated tribal village, hiking trails, plants native to Oklahoma and Mississippi, and a statue by sculptor and former Oklahoma state senator Enoch Kelly Haney.
