= Chaloklowa Chickasaw =

US nonprofit organization and "state-recognized group"

Chaloklowa Chickasaw Indian People
- Official logo of the Chaloklowa Chickasaw Indian People
- Abbreviation: Chaloklowa Chickasaw
- Formation: June 21, 1999; 27 years ago
- Founder: Vernon M. Tanner
- Founded at: Hemingway, SC
- Type: Nonprofit
- Tax ID no.: EIN 57-1081738
- Purpose: A23: Cultural, Ethnic Awareness
- Headquarters: Indiantown, South Carolina
- Members: 176
- Official language: English

The Chaloklowa Chickasaw Indian People or Chaloklowa Chickasaw is a 501(c)(3) nonprofit organization and "state-recognized group" not to be confused with a state-recognized tribe. The state of South Carolina gave them the state-recognized group and special interest organization designation under the SC Code Section 1-31-40 (A) (7)(10), Statutory Authority Chapter 139 (100–111) in 2005.

The organization claims descent from 50 Chickasaws who moved to South Carolina at the state's request in the 18th century. The Chickasaw are an Indigenous people of the Southeastern Woodlands who formerly inhabited parts of Alabama, Mississippi, and Tennessee. Chaloklowa is said to come from the Chickasaw word chalokloha which means turkey. The organization sometimes refers to its leaders as mingo, a title said to derive from the Chickasaw word miko which means chief. Late historian Edward J. Cashin, a professor of colonial era history and Director of the Center for the Study of Georgia History at Augusta State University, was unable to ascertain the organization's connection to the Savannah River Chickasaws.

== Headquarters and Purpose ==
The Chaloklowa Chickasaw are headquartered in Indiantown, South Carolina with members living within the counties of Florence, Marion, and Williamsburg. The organization was originally founded and led by the late Vernon M. Tanner and his son, Jeff Tanner. The Chaloklowa Chickasaw is a nonprofit educational organization. Tanner stated that one of the Chaloklowa Chickasaws missions is to bring educational programs to schools or other activities with adults to share the true aspects of Native American life and to dispel other commonly believed myths about indigenous people.

== Charity ==
The Chaloklowa Chickasaw organized as a 501(c)(3) public charity in 2002. The organization was awarded $100,147.00 that same year by the Administration for Native Americans (ANA) for Social and Economic Development Strategies.

== Recognition Status ==
South Carolina recognizes "Tribes", "Groups", and "Special Interest Organizations". "State Recognized Groups" are defined by South Carolina law as meaning "a number of individuals assembled together, which have different characteristics, interests and behaviors that do not denote a separate ethnic and cultural heritage today, as they once did. This group is composed of both Native American Indians and other ethnic races. They are not all related to one another by blood. A tribal council and governmental authority unique to Native American Indians govern them". The Chaloklowa Chickasaw initially applied for recognition as a "Tribe" in February 2005 but its application was rejected because the organization could not meet South Carolina's standards for proving historical basis due to a lack of genealogical records. The organization immediately reapplied for recognition as a "Group" and achieved this official designation a few months later, in June 2005. Vice-Chief Joe Tanner stated that it was the intention of the organization to reapply for recognition as a "Tribe" within September of that same year. The South Carolina Commission for Minority Affairs continues to list the Chaloklowa Chickasaw Indian People as one of its "State Recognized Groups and Special Interest Organizations" and not as a state recognized tribe.

In 2003, the Chaloklowas petitioned the US Department of the Interior Bureau of Indian Affairs to try to receive federal recognition as an Indian tribe.

== Controversy ==
After receiving several letters of complaint concerning the Chaloklowa Chickasaw's second petition for recognition as a State Recognized tribe in October 2005, the Commission of Minority Affairs review committee, upon rereview, found that the indigenous ancestry being claimed by the group was incorrect. This announcement came as a surprise to the CMA as the petition had previously been called "a model" for others to follow by CMA director, Janie Davis. The news was controversial throughout indigenous communities in South Carolina, as just weeks before, the group's then leader, Vernon Tanner, was appointed by the state Senate as the first ever "Native American Commissioner to the Board of the South Carolina Commission for Minority Affairs". Members of at least one indigenous community publicly expressed a lack of trust in South Carolina's recognition process as the result of the CMA's previous oversight and other alleged inequities. The Chaloklowa Chickasaw today remain recognized as a “Group” in South Carolina, a status obtained several months prior to the controversy.

== Other Activities ==
On August 30, 2002, the Nuclear Regulatory Commission invited the Chaloklowa Chickasaw, along with members of seven other indigenous communities in the Carolinas, to participate in the scoping process for the H. B. Robinson Nuclear Generating Station.

The organization participates in events throughout the year held at Lynches River in Johnsonville, South Carolina in order to provide information about the role of the Chickasaw in local history.

Chief Tanner, also referred to as "Mingo Big Bear Claw", formerly gave educational presentations to elementary and middle school students. He also gave presentations to civic groups, churches, scout troops, YMCA groups, and local libraries. Each year, students from Johnsonville Elementary School take a field trip to Tanner Farms to learn about Chickasaw life from the Tanners and take part in traditional cooking methods, receive hands-on experience with live animals, and sit inside of a tipi. Vernon Tanner publicly claimed to be the last traditional medicine man in South Carolina and sometimes explained forms of indigenous spirituality within his educational presentations. The group maintains that Indiantown Presbyterian Church, where Tanner served as a lay speaker and church elder, is a sacred site to the Chickasaw.

== See also ==
- Vernon M. Tanner
- Cherokee heritage groups
- Chickasaw
- Plastic Shaman
- Pretendian
