= Ababinili =

North American myths

From Chickasaw mythology, Aba' Bínni'li', translating to "The One That Sits Above," is the creator deity of the Chickasaw. He is often associated with the sun and the ceremonial fire of the stomp dance, where he is said to be present.
