= Lake of the Arbuckles =

Reservoir in Murray County, Oklahoma

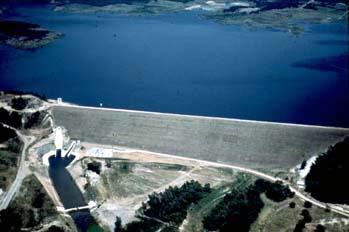
- Arbuckle Dam and Reservoir

- Location within Oklahoma Location within the United States
- Location: Murray County, Oklahoma, United States
- Coordinates: 34°26′01″N 097°01′40″W
- Lake type: reservoir
- Primary inflows: Buckhorn, Guy Sandy, and Rock Creeks
- Primary outflows: Rock Creek
- Basin countries: United States
- Surface area: 3,127 acres (1,265 ha) (max.), 2,350 acres (950 ha) (normal)
- Water volume: 108,839 acre⋅ft (134.251 hm^{3}) at elevation 885.3 ft (269.8 m) (maximum)
- Shore length^{1}: 36 mi (58 km)
- Settlements: Sulphur, Ardmore, Wynnewood
- ^{1} Shore length is not a well-defined measure.

The Lake of the Arbuckles is a reservoir located in southern Oklahoma, 8 miles (13 km) southwest of Sulphur in Murray County. The lake covers 2,350 acres (950 ha) and is a principal water supply reservoir for the city of Ardmore, some 30 mi (48 km) to the southwest. It also supplies water to the cities of Sulphur, Davis, Wynnewood and a large oil refinery near Wynnewood. The lake also provides flood control, fish and wildlife habitat and recreation opportunities.

== Project timeline ==
During the early 1950s, a drought seriously depleted then-existing water supplies for the cities and towns in the Arbuckle area. Bureau of Reclamation representatives began meeting in 1956 with local officials about the feasibility of an Arbuckle water project. The proposed project was supported by the Oklahoma Congressional delegation. The Bureau prepared a preliminary development plan in 1961. Public Law 87-594, approved August 24, 1962 (76 Stat. 395) authorized the Arbuckle Project. The final development plan was completed in 1964. A contract to construct Arbuckle Dam was awarded June 9, 1964, and completed June 30, 1966. The project also incorporated certain other infrastructure. These included an aqueduct and pumping system to supply water to area customers, The contract for this construction was awarded August 27, 1965, and the work was completed in 1968. The Bureau turned over the operation and maintenance responsibilities to the Arbuckle Master Conservancy District on January 1, 1968.

== Description of dam and lake ==
Arbuckle Dam, creating Lake of the Arbuckles, was built by the United States Bureau of Reclamation on Rock Creek. at the confluence of Buckhorn, Guy Sandy, and Rock Creeks. The lake is very scenic, nestled within the Chickasaw National Recreation Area. The dam is constructed of earth fill, with a volume of 2,977,800 cubic yards (2,276,700 m^{3}).Its height is 150 feet (46 m) and crest length is 2,700 feet (820 m).

The total capacity of the lake at elevation 885.3 feet (269.8 m) is 108,839 acre-feet (134,251,000 m^{3}).The conservation capacity is 62,571 acre-feet (77,180,000 m^{3}) at elevation 872.0 feet (265.8 m). The surface area at the maximum elevation is 3,127 acres (12.65 km^{2}).

== Water delivery systems ==
The Arbuckle project included a pumping station downstream from the dam and a 17.9 miles (28.8 km) pipeline to deliver water to Davis and Wynnewood. The pipeline diameter ranges from 10 inches (250 mm) to 27 inches (690 mm).

== Recreation ==
The Oklahoma Department of Wildlife Conservation has rated the lake as the best for bass fishing in the state. The lake features 36 miles of shoreline. Fishing is permitted year-round for crappie, catfish, largemouth bass, white bass and bluegill. Facilities include three campgrounds for tents and RVs, picnic areas, public restrooms and boat docks and ramps.

There are 3,400 acres (14,000,000 m^{2}) of land available for recreational use adjacent to the reservoir. Included within the Chickasaw National Recreation Area managed by the National Park Service, the Oklahoma Department of Wildlife Conservation provides wildlife management.
