= Turner Falls =

Waterfall in Oklahoma, United States

Coordinates: 34°25′31″N 97°08′55″W

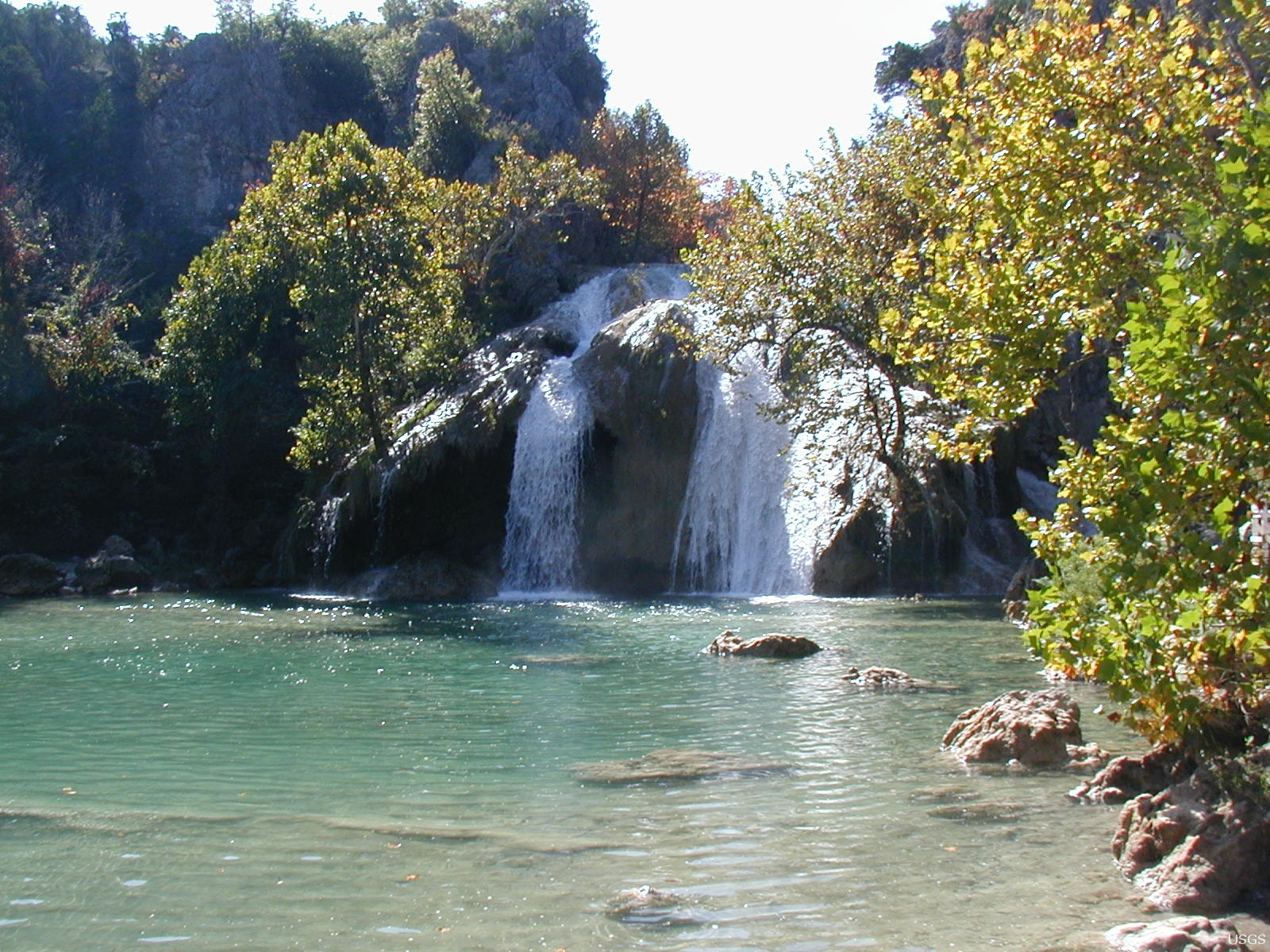
- Turner Falls
- Interactive map of Turner Falls
- Location: Turner Falls Park, Interstate 35, Davis, Oklahoma, United States
- Type: Fan
- Total height: 77 ft (23 m)

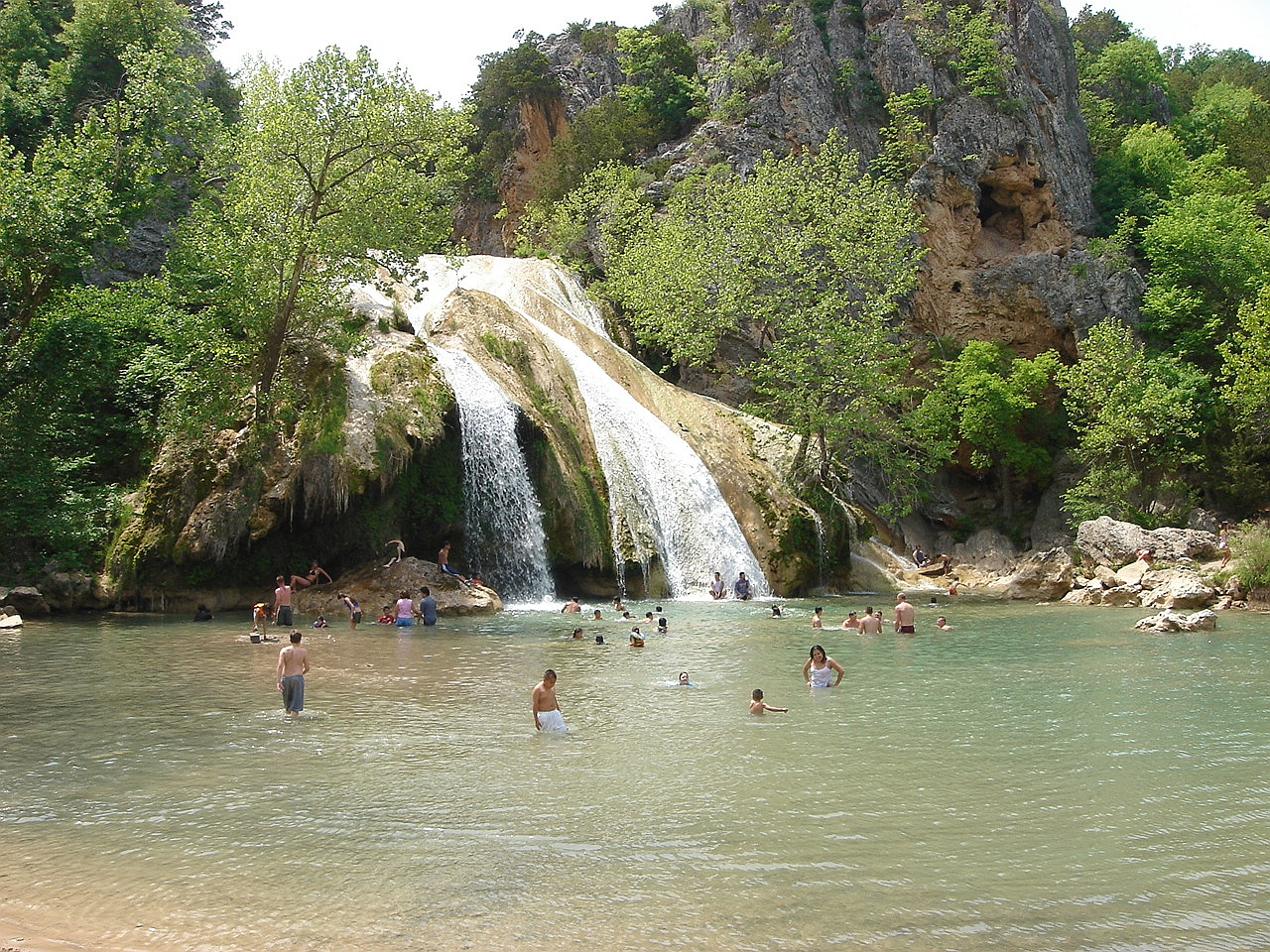
Swimming at Turner Falls

Turner Falls is a waterfall on Honey Creek in the Arbuckle Mountains of south-central Oklahoma, United States, 6 miles (9.7 km) south of Davis. With a height of 77 feet (23 m), Turner Falls is locally considered Oklahoma's tallest waterfall, although its height matches one in Natural Falls State Park.

Turner Falls has claimed people's lives; only experienced swimmers should swim there.

== History ==
Mazeppa Thomas Turner, a Scottish immigrant farmer who married Laura Johnson, a Chickasaw woman, settled in the area in 1878 and discovered the falls. The falls were named for him.

Recreational use began in or before 1868. At the time, Turner Falls was located in Pickens County, Chickasaw Nation. Today, the falls are part of Turner Falls Park, a city park operated by the city of Davis, Oklahoma. The falls cascade into a natural swimming pool, one of two such pools within the park, and these are popular tourist destinations in the summer.

The city of Davis acquired the park in 1919 and operated it until 1950. It then leased the facility to other interests until 1978, when it resumed control. The park covers 1,500 acres (6.1 km^{2}), and also contains nature trails, caves, and other interesting geological features. It also has a walk-in castle, originally built in the 1930s as a summer home for Dr. Ellsworth Collings, a professor and later dean of the School of Education at the University of Oklahoma.

== See also ==
- List of waterfalls
