= Scullin, Oklahoma =

Town in Murray County, Oklahoma, US

Coordinates: 34°31′07″N 96°51′45″W

Scullin is a small town in the state of Oklahoma. It is located in Murray County and has an unknown population estimated to be less than 100.

== History ==
The community of Scullin has a very vague history, mostly due to its extremely low population. It was founded before 1895, and was (at the time) located in an Indian Territory. From 1906 to 1909, Scullin and the surrounding areas had a newspaper named the Scullin Advocate.

== Geography ==
Scullin is located around 1,200 feet (370 meters) above sea level. The largest town in Murray County, Sulphur, Oklahoma, is just 7.5 miles east of Scullin.
