= Chickasaw National Recreation Area =

Protected area in Oklahoma, United States

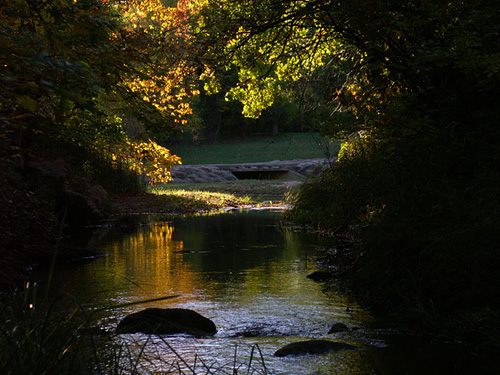
- Travertine Creek, in the Chickasaw National Recreation Area

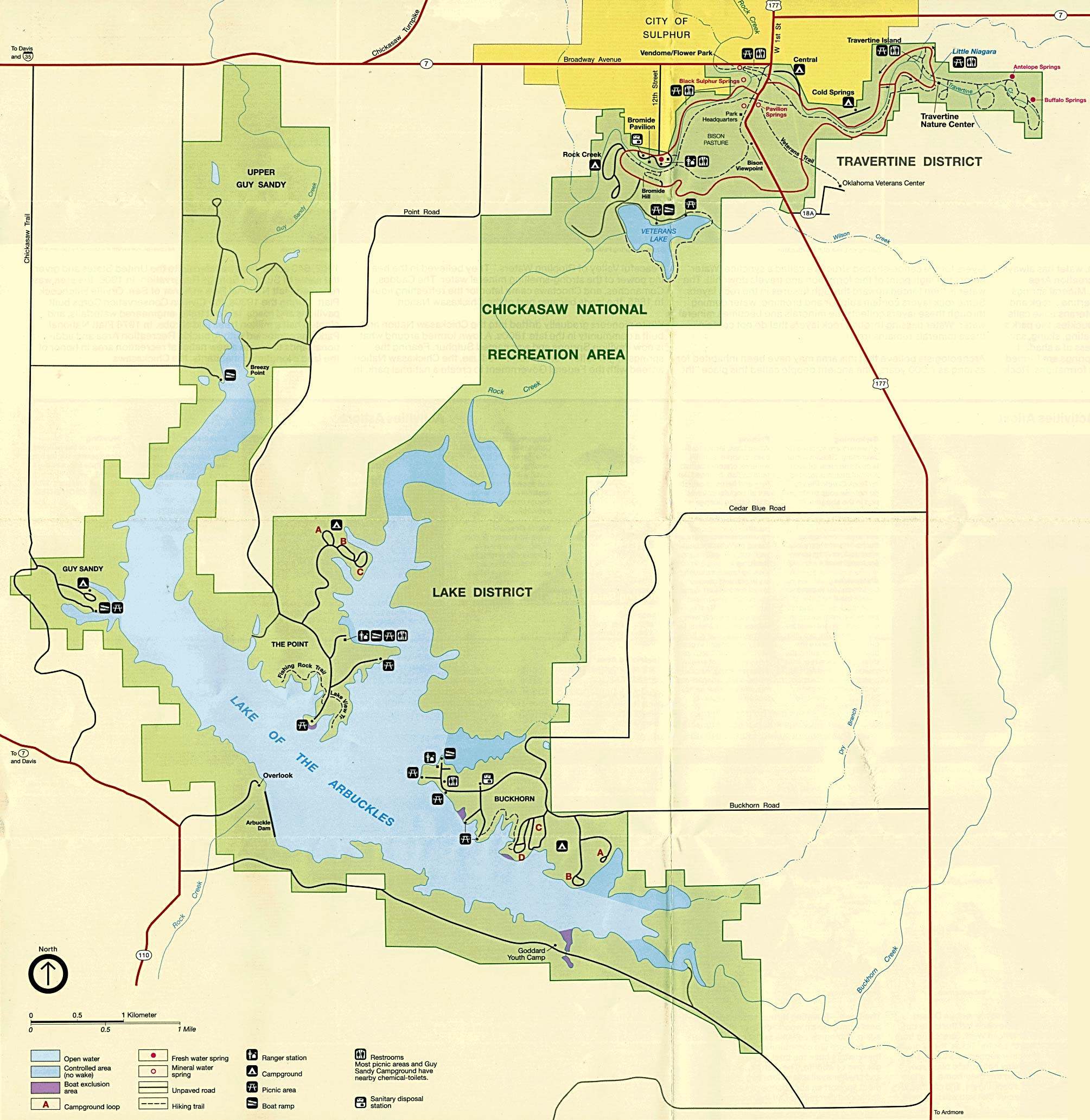
- Map of the Chickasaw National Recreation Area
- Location: Murray County, Oklahoma, USA
- Nearest city: Sulphur, OK
- Coordinates: 34°30′2″N 96°58′20″W
- Area: 9,899 acres (40.06 km^{2})
- Established: July 1, 1902
- Visitors: 1,455,530 (in 2022)
- Governing body: National Park Service
- Website: Chickasaw National Recreation Area

Chickasaw National Recreation Area is a national recreation area in the foothills of the Arbuckle Mountains in south-central Oklahoma near Sulphur in Murray County. It includes the former Platt National Park and Arbuckle Recreation Area.

Part of the area was established as Sulphur Springs Reservation on July 1, 1902, and renamed and redesignated Platt National Park on June 29, 1906. At the time of its founding, the reservation, later national park, was located in Pickens County, Chickasaw Nation.

On March 17, 1976, Platt National Park was combined with the Arbuckle Recreation Area and additional lands and renamed. Of the park's 9,888.83 acres (4,002 ha), water covers 2,409 acres (975 ha). The park contains many fine examples of Civilian Conservation Corps rustic National Park Service-style architecture of the 1930s. CCC workers created pavilions, park buildings, and enclosures for the park's many natural springs.

The Chickasaw National Recreation Area preserves partially forested hills of south-central Oklahoma near Sulphur. Named to honor the Chickasaw Indian Nation, who were relocated to the area from the Southeastern United States during the 1830s (and who later sold the original 640 acres (260 ha) of land for the park to the Federal government), the park's springs, streams, and lakes provide opportunities for swimming, boating, fishing, picnicking, camping, and hiking, among other activities. As part of the Chickasaw tribe's arrangement with the U.S. government, the park does not charge an admission fee.

== History ==
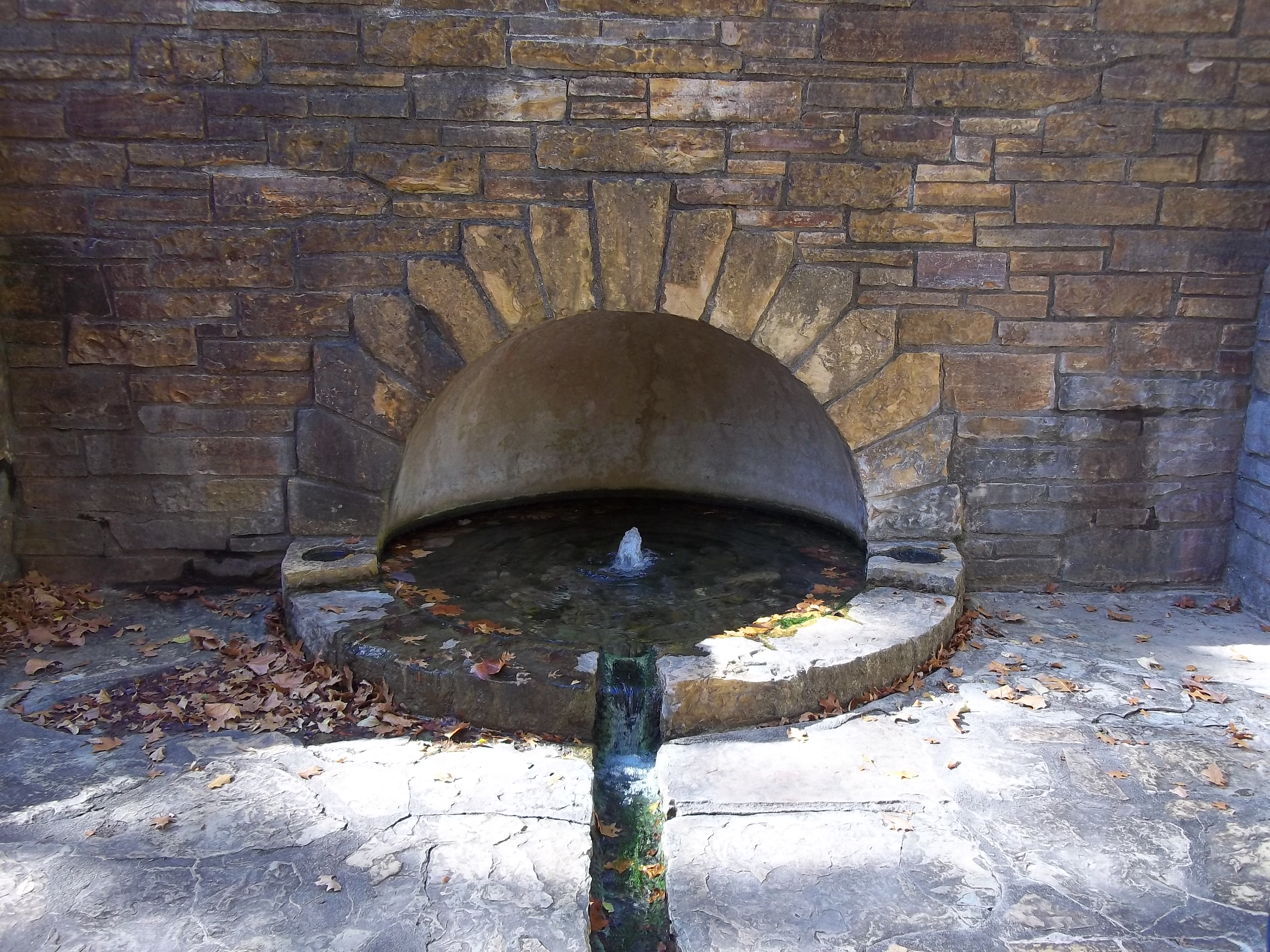
CCC stone work at Hillside Spring.

When the Choctaw and Chickasaw tribes were forced to move from their former lands in the southeastern United States, they found an area within the new Chickasaw nation that contained a number of natural fresh and mineral springs that they believed had healing powers. Fearing that developers would turn the springs into a private resort, as had happened earlier at Hot Springs, Arkansas, the Chickasaw sold a 640-acre parcel to the U. S. Government, which named it the Sulphur Springs Reservation in 1902.

== Platt National Park ==
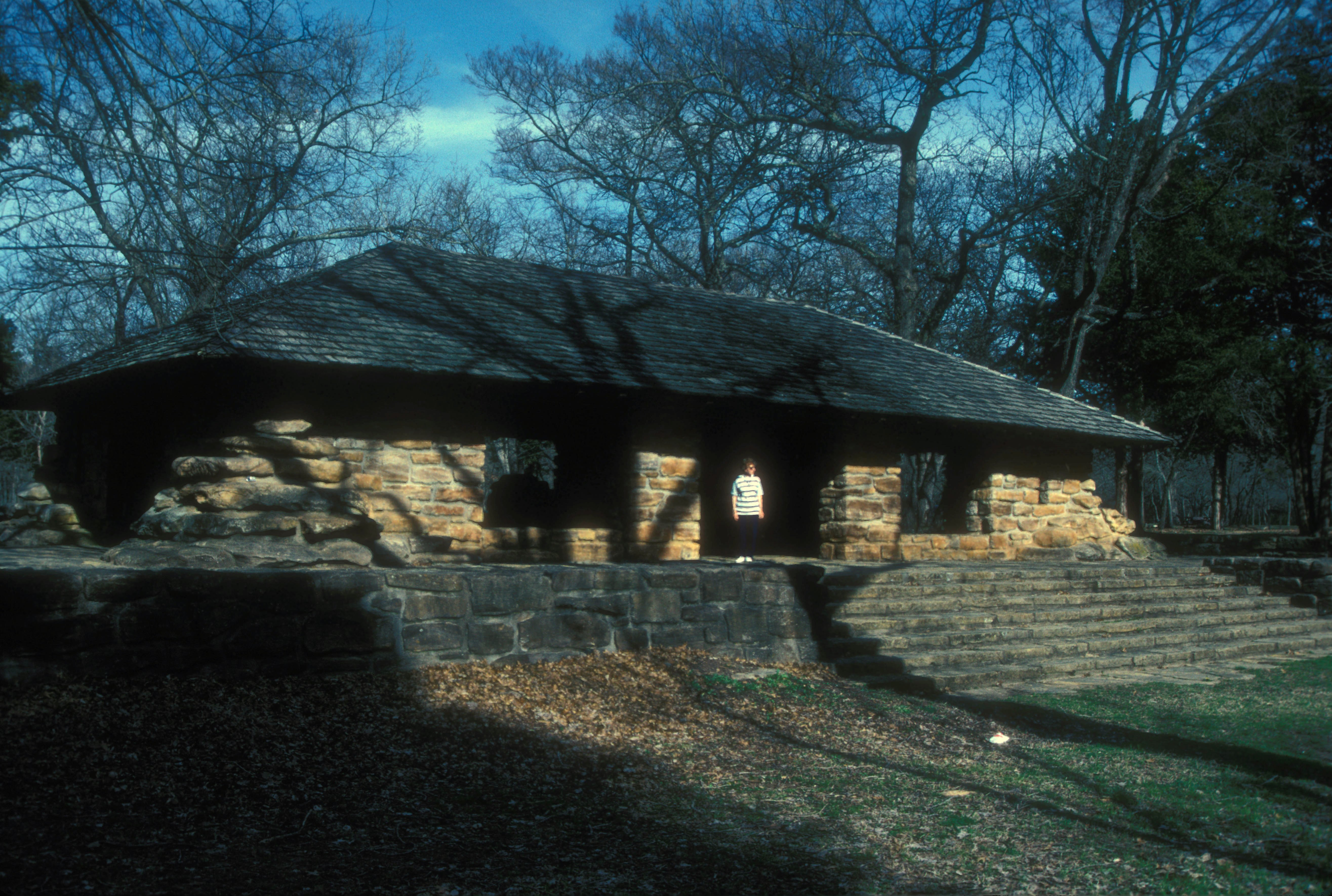
"Bromide Pavilion" built by Civilian Conservation Corps in Platt National Park. Photo made July 12, 2007.

In 1902, Orville H. Platt, a U.S. senator from the state of Connecticut, introduced legislation to establish the 640-acre (260 ha) Sulphur Springs Reservation, protecting 32 freshwater and mineral springs in Murray County, Oklahoma (then part of Indian Territory). The reservation officially opened to the public April 29, 1904. On June 29, 1906, Congress re-designated the reservation as Platt National Park, named for the senator, a year after his death. It had the distinctions of being the seventh and smallest national park created in the United States as well as the only national park in Oklahoma, until its redesignation as a National Recreation Area in 1976. Since then, Gateway Arch National Park has taken its place as the smallest national park, at just 192 acres (78 ha).

Visitors soon thronged to the new national park. Both the Sulphur Springs Railway (later the St. Louis-San Francisco Railway or "Frisco") and the Atchison, Topeka and Santa Fe Railway ("Santa Fe") had built spur lines to Sulphur, which became the main entrance to the park. According to the National Park Service (NPS), in 1914, Platt had more visitors than either Yellowstone or Yosemite.

In the 1930s, crews of the New Deal Civilian Conservation Corps developed the park's infrastructure, applying then-popular ideas of landscape design to create a tranquil and scenic oasis. The environment built during this time has remained well-preserved, and was designated a National Historic Landmark in 2011.

=== Creation of CNRA ===
Platt National Park was abolished by Congress and made part of the much larger Chickasaw National Recreation Area (CNRA) in 1976, which included Lake of the Arbuckles.

In 1983, the city of Sulphur traded the 67-acre Veterans Lake (27 ha) to the recreation area in exchange for a strip of land above the State Highway 7 bridge.

In 2011, the United States Mint issued a quarter featuring the Chickasaw's Lincoln Bridge, a limestone bridge built in 1909 to commemorate the 100th birthday of Abraham Lincoln, as part of its America the Beautiful Quarters series.

The park was directly hit by the 2024 Sulphur tornado, which heavily damaged many areas of the park from the Lake of the Arbuckles into the Travertine District.

== Travertine district ==
Travertine district, embracing the old Platt National Park, is like a large city park, three miles long and less than one mile wide. A narrow road circles the district, passing by parking areas, camp and picnic grounds, the Travertine Nature Center, swimming holes, and springs. A bison pasture was constructed by the Civilian Conservation Corps in the 1930s. Travertine Creek, joined by Rock Creek, flows through the district, rising in Antelope Springs and Buffalo Springs at the eastern end of the park. The springs produce 5 million gallons per day (20 million liters) of cool, crystal clear-water and form Travertine Creek which is joined by Rock Creek about 2 miles from its source. A number of other fresh water and mineral springs contribute to Travertine and Rock Creek as they flow through Travertine District, dropping in small waterfalls over several ledges. Several miles of walking and biking trails wind through the heavily forested creek bottomland. Very popular and often crowded in summer, the Travertine district has been described as an oasis in the Oklahoma prairie.

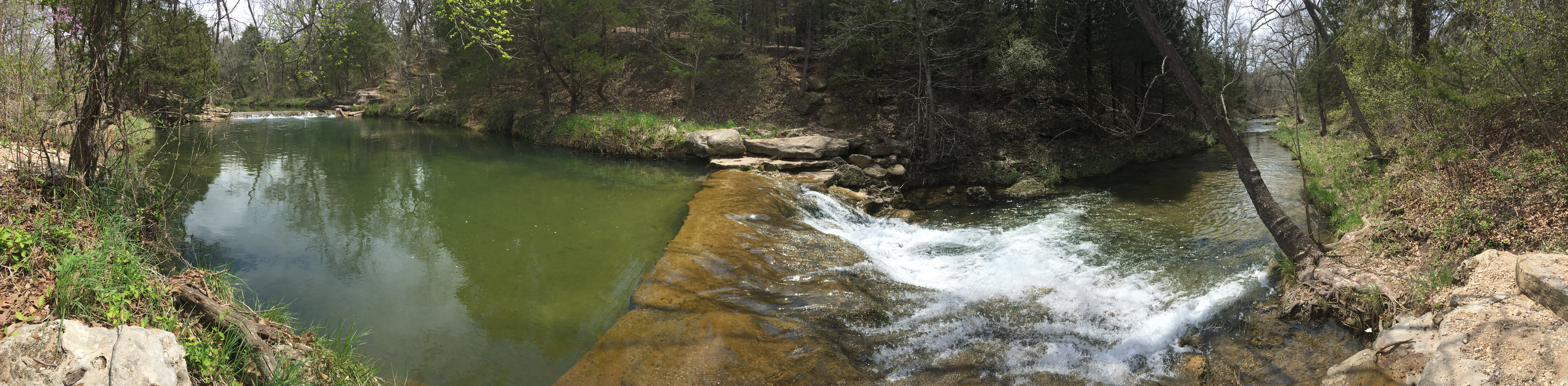
Travertine Creek in Chickasaw National Recreation Area, Oklahoma

== Lake of the Arbuckles ==
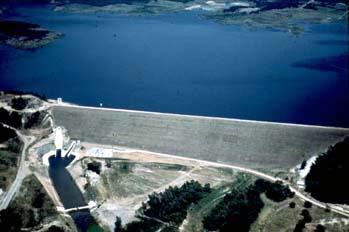
Arbuckle Dam and Reservoir

Most of the National Recreational Area is taken up by the 2,350 acre (950 ha) Lake of the Arbuckles and the prairie and woodland along its shores. The scenic lake is a principal water supply reservoir for the city of Ardmore, some 30 mi (48 km) to the southwest. Lake of the Arbuckles was built by the Bureau of Reclamation in 1966 by impounding Rock Creek. Water quality and clarity are excellent. The Oklahoma Department of Wildlife Conservation has rated the lake as the best for bass fishing in the state. The lake features 36 miles of shoreline. Fishing is permitted year-round for crappie, catfish, largemouth bass, white bass and bluegill. Facilities include three campgrounds for tents and RVs, picnic areas, public restrooms, boat docks and ramps, and several miles of multi-use trails. Hunting is also allowed, and typically hunted species are quail, turkey, squirrel, rabbit, dove, ducks, geese, and deer. However, due to heavy hunting pressure and small area size, game is declining and trapping is prohibited. Hunting regulations and certain special rules (such as not killing male deer), are designed to regulate the hunt.

== See also ==
- List of National Historic Landmarks in Oklahoma
- National Register of Historic Places listings in Murray County, Oklahoma
