= Sulphur, Oklahoma =

- City
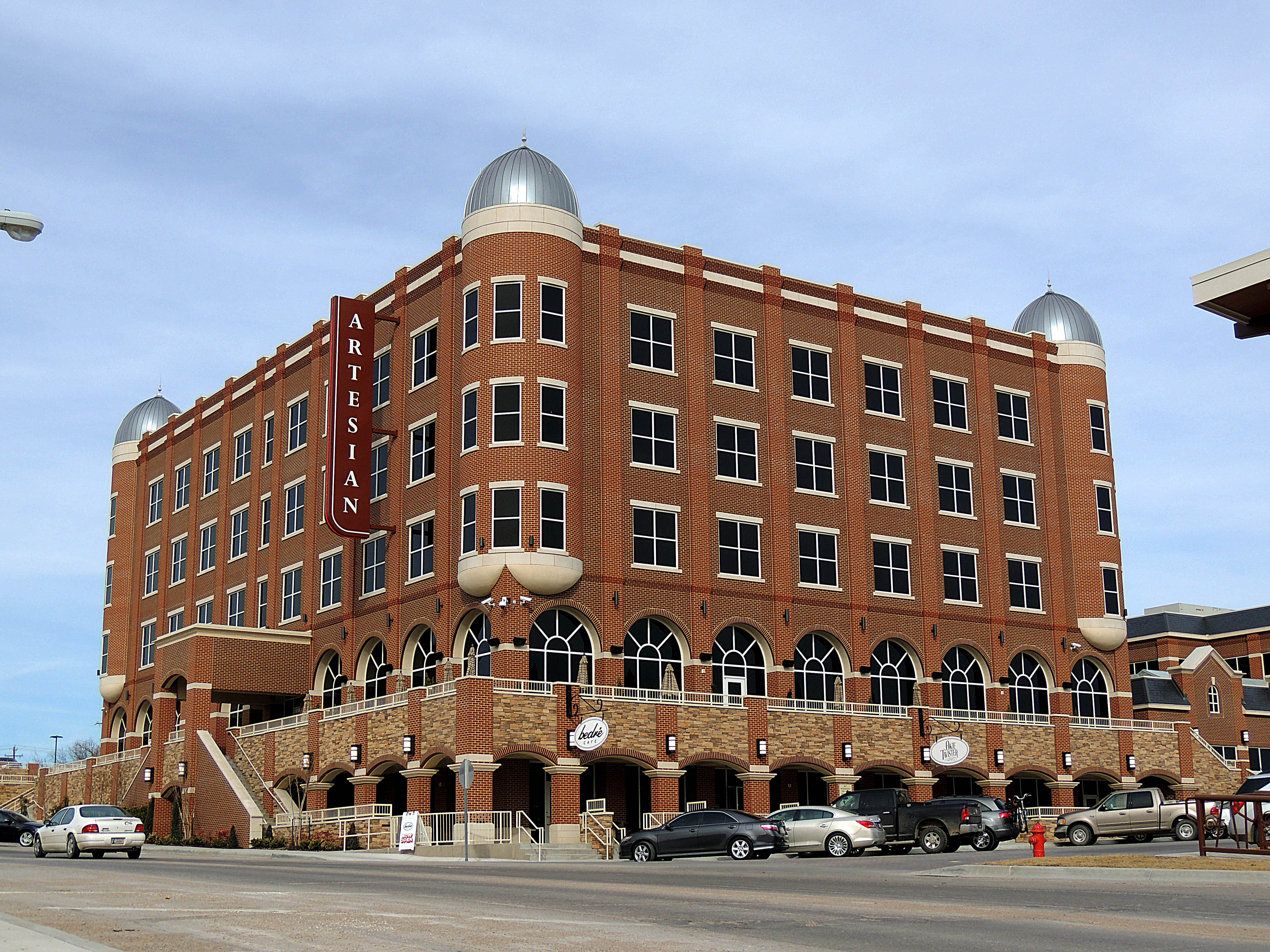
- Chickasaw Nation Artesian Hotel (2014)
- Nickname: "City of Springs"
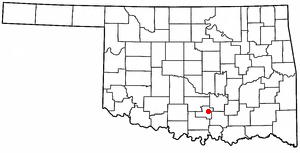
- Location in Oklahoma
- Coordinates: 34°30′33″N 96°58′31″W
- Country: United States
- State: Oklahoma
- County: Murray

Area
  - Total: 6.19 sq mi (16.0 km^{2})
  - Land: 6.02 sq mi (15.6 km^{2})
  - Water: 0.17 sq mi (0.44 km^{2})
- Elevation: 981 ft (299 m)

Population (2020)
  - Total: 5,065
  - Density: 739.2/sq mi (285.41/km^{2})
- Time zone: UTC-6 (Central (CST))
  - Summer (DST): UTC-5 (CDT)
- ZIP Code: 73086
- Area code: 580
- FIPS code: 40-71350
- GNIS feature ID: 2411997
- Website: www.sulphurok.city

Sulphur is a city in, and the county seat of Murray County, Oklahoma, United States. The population was 5,065 at the 2020 census. The area around Sulphur has been noted for its mineral springs since well before the city was founded late in the 19th century. The city received its name from the presence of sulfur in the water. (Note: When the city was founded, either sulphur or sulfur was acceptable spelling for the name of the chemical element in English. Later in the 20th century, "sulfur" was accepted as the standard by the International Union of Pure and Applied Chemistry (IUPAC). However, the original spelling has been retained by the city for its name.)

== History ==
This area was part of Pickens County, Chickasaw Nation, in the Indian Territory during the late 19th century. The first known settler was Noah Lael, son-in-law of former Chickasaw Governor Cyrus Harris, who built a ranch south of Pavilion Springs in 1878. In 1882, Harris sold the ranch to Perry Froman, a part Chickasaw rancher. The Encyclopedia of Oklahoma History and Culture says the ranch house was the first residence in Sulphur.

About 1890, a group of fisherman built a clubhouse at the Sulphur site. Conventions and other gatherings began meeting in the vicinity during the early 1890s. The clubhouse owners enlarged the building and sold it for use as a hotel. Richard A. Sneed, a lawyer who visited the area about 1890, soon after organized the Sulphur Springs Company. The company bought 600 acres (2.4 km^{2}) of land from Froman Ranch and platted a townsite. A post office named Sulphur was established October 2, 1895. The Sulphur Headlight, the first newspaper in town, began publication in 1899, and the first telephone exchange in town went into service in 1900.

In the late spring of 1903, the Sulphur Springs Railway was completed between Sulphur and Scullin, a distance of about 9 miles (14 km), connecting at Scullin to the newly completed St. Louis–San Francisco Railway (the Frisco). The railroad bought the Sulphur Springs Railway in 1907.

In 1902, the U.S. government and the Chickasaw Nation agreed to preserve the area around the springs on the south side of downtown, and called it the Sulphur Springs Reservation, later renaming it Platt National Park, named for Senator Orville H. Platt from Connecticut, who sponsored the legislation. People and buildings were required to move out of the reservation area. The people resettled nearby, creating two communities, West Sulphur and East Sulphur, divided by Rock Creek. Another such move occurred in 1904, when the U.S. government decided to add 200 acres (0.81 km^{2}) to the new park. The reservation officially opened to the public on April 29, 1904. For 74 years, Platt was Oklahoma's only national park. It was abolished by Congress in 1976 and made part of the much larger Chickasaw National Recreation Area, which includes the Lake of the Arbuckles.

Sulphur defeated Davis, Oklahoma, in an election in 1908 to determine the location of the seat of the newly created Murray County.

A tornado touched down just northwest of the town on May 9, 2016. It was rated EF3 and did severe damage to homes and trees in the area. Late at night on April 27, 2024, the city was hit by a destructive tornado as part of a much larger tornado outbreak that impacted southern and northern parts of Oklahoma. There was one confirmed fatality in Sulphur, and the majority of the town suffered substantial damage as a direct hit of the tornado.

== Geography ==
Sulphur is in southern Oklahoma, in the eastern part of Murray County. It is about 84 miles (135 km) southeast of Oklahoma City. U.S. Route 177 and State Highway 7 intersect in the center of town. US 177 leads south 23 miles (37 km) to Dickson and north 59 miles (95 km) to Shawnee, while SH 7 leads west 8 miles (13 km) to Davis and east, then south, 14 miles (23 km) to Mill Creek. The Chickasaw Turnpike has its southwestern terminus at SH 7, 2 miles (3 km) west of town, and leads northeast 27 miles (43 km) to Ada.

According to the U.S. Census Bureau, the city of Sulphur has a total area of 6.2 square miles (16.1 km^{2}), of which 0.2 square miles (0.5 km^{2}), or 2.83%, are water. Most of the water area is in Veterans Lake, a reservoir on Wilson Creek, a tributary of Rock Creek which passes through the city. Rock Creek continues southwest to the Lake of the Arbuckles three miles (5 km) from the city, then on to the Washita River near Dougherty.

== Demographics ==
Historical population
Census	Pop.	Note	%±
1900	1,198		—
1910	3,684		207.5%
1920	3,607		−2.1%
1930	4,242		17.6%
1940	4,970		17.2%
1950	4,389		−11.7%
1960	4,737		7.9%
1970	5,158		8.9%
1980	5,516		6.9%
1990	4,824		−12.5%
2000	4,794		−0.6%
2010	4,929		2.8%
2020	5,065		2.8%
U.S. Decennial Census

=== 2020 census ===
As of the 2020 census, Sulphur had a population of 5,065 and a median age of 40.9 years; 23.3% of residents were under the age of 18 and 20.7% of residents were 65 years of age or older. For every 100 females there were 106.4 males, and for every 100 females age 18 and over there were 104.7 males age 18 and over.

95.5% of residents lived in urban areas, while 4.5% lived in rural areas.

There were 1,899 households in Sulphur, of which 32.6% had children under the age of 18 living in them. Of all households, 41.5% were married-couple households, 19.9% were households with a male householder and no spouse or partner present, and 30.6% were households with a female householder and no spouse or partner present. About 29.5% of all households were made up of individuals and 14.4% had someone living alone who was 65 years of age or older. There were 2,285 housing units, of which 16.9% were vacant. Among occupied housing units, 61.2% were owner-occupied and 38.8% were renter-occupied. The homeowner vacancy rate was 1.9% and the rental vacancy rate was 12.1%.

Racial composition as of the 2020 census
Race	Percent
White	66.0%
Black or African American	1.2%
American Indian and Alaska Native	14.6%
Asian	0.5%
Native Hawaiian and Other Pacific Islander	0.4%
Some other race	5.0%
Two or more races	12.3%
Hispanic or Latino (of any race)	9.5%

=== 2000 census ===
As of the 2000 census, there were 4,794 people, 1,877 households, and 1,244 families residing in the city. The population density was 703.1 inhabitants per square mile (271.5/km^{2}). There were 2,220 housing units at an average density of 325.6 per square mile (125.7/km^{2}). The racial makeup of the city was 79.45% White, 1.36% African American, 12.72% Native American, 0.38% Asian, 0.04% Pacific Islander, 1.52% from other races, and 4.53% from two or more races. Hispanic or Latino of any race were 4.80% of the population.

There were 1,877 households, out of which 100.0% had children under the age of 18 living with them, 49.3% were married couples living together, 12.8% had a female householder with no husband present, and 33.7% were non-families. 30.3% of all households were made up of individuals, and 15.5% had someone living alone who was 65 years of age or older. The average household size was 2.40 and the average family size was 2.97.

In the city, the population was spread out, with 23.9% under the age of 18, 9.2% from 18 to 24, 25.0% from 25 to 44, 21.3% from 45 to 64, and 20.5% who were 65 years of age or older. The median age was 39 years. For every 100 females, there were 96.1 males. For every 100 females age 18 and over, there were 90.8 males.

The median income for a household in the city was $27,236, and the median income for a family was $35,000. Males had a median income of $28,712 versus $19,438 for females. The per capita income for the city was $15,691. About 7.9% of families and 12.3% of the population were below the poverty line, including 17.5% of those under age 18 and 13.5% of those age 65 or over.

== Economy ==
Although extraction industries (asphalt, lead, and zinc mines) have long been important, tourism has become the primary support to the local economy.

== Attractions ==
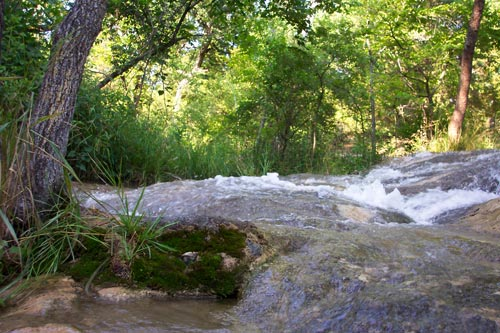
Travertine Creek, in the Chickasaw National Recreation Area, located in the foothills of the Arbuckles near Sulphur

Chickasaw National Recreation Area (originally Platt National Park), a popular destination for many regional tourists, is located just south of the town of Sulphur. Principal attractions in Sulphur besides the park are sulfurous water springs in town that were once thought to cure ailments and other medical conditions. The pungent odor and taste are quite popular with some people. Other attractions include the Arbuckle Mountain range, just to the southwest, complete with many hiking and recreational opportunities.

Sulphur is also the home to the Chickasaw Cultural Center, a museum which tells the story of the Chickasaw Nation.

Vendome Well remains the state's largest artesian spring. Its sulfur water fed a stream that converged with Travertine Creek and formed a small lake. People smeared the lake's mud on their bodies to cure ailments.

== Government ==
Each of the city's five wards has a councilor, and the councilors collectively form the city's governing body. As of 2020, Andy Freeman currently serves as City Manager.

== Education ==
The city of Sulphur is served by the Sulphur Public School District. The first public school opened in 1904. There is one elementary, intermediate, junior high and high school (Sulphur High School). During 2008, the enrollment for the district was at 1,383 students.

Athletics are a major piece of the school culture in Sulphur. Football is the most popular sport, and the Bulldogs have won State Championships in class 3A (2002) and 2A (2004). They were the 3A state runner-up in 2003. Powerlifting, basketball and baseball are also popular sports. The Bulldogs have won state championships in both baseball (1966 and 2004) and powerlifting (2005 and 2006). There has been a long and heated rivalry between Sulphur and the neighboring town of Davis, OK, located just 7 miles to the west, known locally as the Murray County Bedlam.

Oklahoma School for the Deaf is also located in Sulphur, Oklahoma. It opened in 1908 to provide the same educational opportunities for deaf and hard-of-hearing students as other schools provide for hearing students. These also include participation in sports: football, volleyball, track, etc.

== Infrastructure ==
=== Roads and highways ===
Major highways are:

- Oklahoma State Highway 7
- Oklahoma State Highway 7 Spur
- Chickasaw Turnpike
- U.S. Route 177

== Notable people ==
- Loyd Arms won the NCAA Wrestling National Championship in the heavyweight division. Arms was drafted by the Chicago Cardinals with the 129th overall selection of the 1943 NFL Draft.
- Wayne Bennett, blues guitarist, was born in Sulphur.
- Roy Joseph Turner served as state governor from 1947 to 1951. Turner was born on November 6, 1894, in Lincoln County, Oklahoma Territory. Turner Turnpike, linking Tulsa with Oklahoma City was named for him.
