= Chickasaw =

Indigenous people of Southeastern Woodlands of the US

Chickasaw: Chikashsha

Total population
- 38,351

Regions with significant populations
- United States (Oklahoma, formerly Mississippi, Alabama, and Tennessee)

Languages
- English, Chickasaw

Religion
- Traditional tribal religion, Christianity (Protestantism)

Related ethnic groups
- Choctaw, Chakchiuma, Alabama, Koasati, Muskogee, and Seminole peoples

The Chickasaw (/ˈtʃɪkəsɔː/ CHIK-ə-saw) are an Indigenous people of the Southeastern Woodlands, United States. Their traditional territory was in northern Mississippi, northwestern and northern Alabama, western Tennessee and southwestern Kentucky. Their language is classified as a member of the Muskogean language family. In the present day, they are organized as the federally recognized Chickasaw Nation.

Chickasaw people have a migration story in which they moved from a land west of the Mississippi River to reach present-day northeast Mississippi, northwest Alabama, and into Lawrence County, Tennessee. They had interaction with French, English, and Spanish colonists during the colonial period. The United States considered the Chickasaw one of the Five Civilized Tribes of the Southeast, as they adopted numerous practices of European Americans. Resisting European-American settlers encroaching on their territory, they were forced by the U.S. government to sell their traditional lands in the 1832 Treaty of Pontotoc Creek and move to Indian Territory (Oklahoma) during the era of Indian removal in the 1830s.

Most of their descendants remain as residents of what is now Oklahoma. The Chickasaw Nation in Oklahoma is the 13th-largest federally recognized tribe in the United States. Its members are related to the Choctaw and share a common history with them. The Chickasaw were divided into two groups (moieties): the Imosak Cha'a' (chopped hickory) and the Inchokka' Lhipa' (worn out house), though the characteristics of these groups in relation to Chickasaw villages, clans, and house groups is uncertain. They traditionally followed a kinship system of matrilineal descent, in which inheritance and descent are traced through the maternal line. Children are considered born into the mother's family and clan, and gain their social status from her. Women controlled most property and hereditary leadership in the tribe passed through the maternal line.

== Etymology ==
The name Chickasaw, as noted by anthropologist John Swanton, belonged to a Chickasaw minko', or leader. "Chickasaw" is the English spelling of Chikashsha (Creek pronunciation: [tʃikaʃːa]), meaning "comes from Chicsa." In an 1890 extra census bulletin on the Cherokee, Chickasaw, Choctaw, Muskogee, and Seminole, a history of the Choctaw and Chickasaw was included that was written by R.W. McAdam. McAdam claimed that the word "Chikasha" meant "rebel" in the Choctaw language. Spanish explorer Hernando de Soto had recorded the people as Chicaza when his expedition came into contact with them in 1540; the Spanish were the first known Europeans to explore the North American Southeast.

The suffix -mingo (Chickasaw: minko) is used to identify a chief. For example, Tishomingo was the name of a famous Chickasaw chief. The towns of Tishomingo in Mississippi and Oklahoma were named for him, as was Tishomingo County in Mississippi.

== History ==
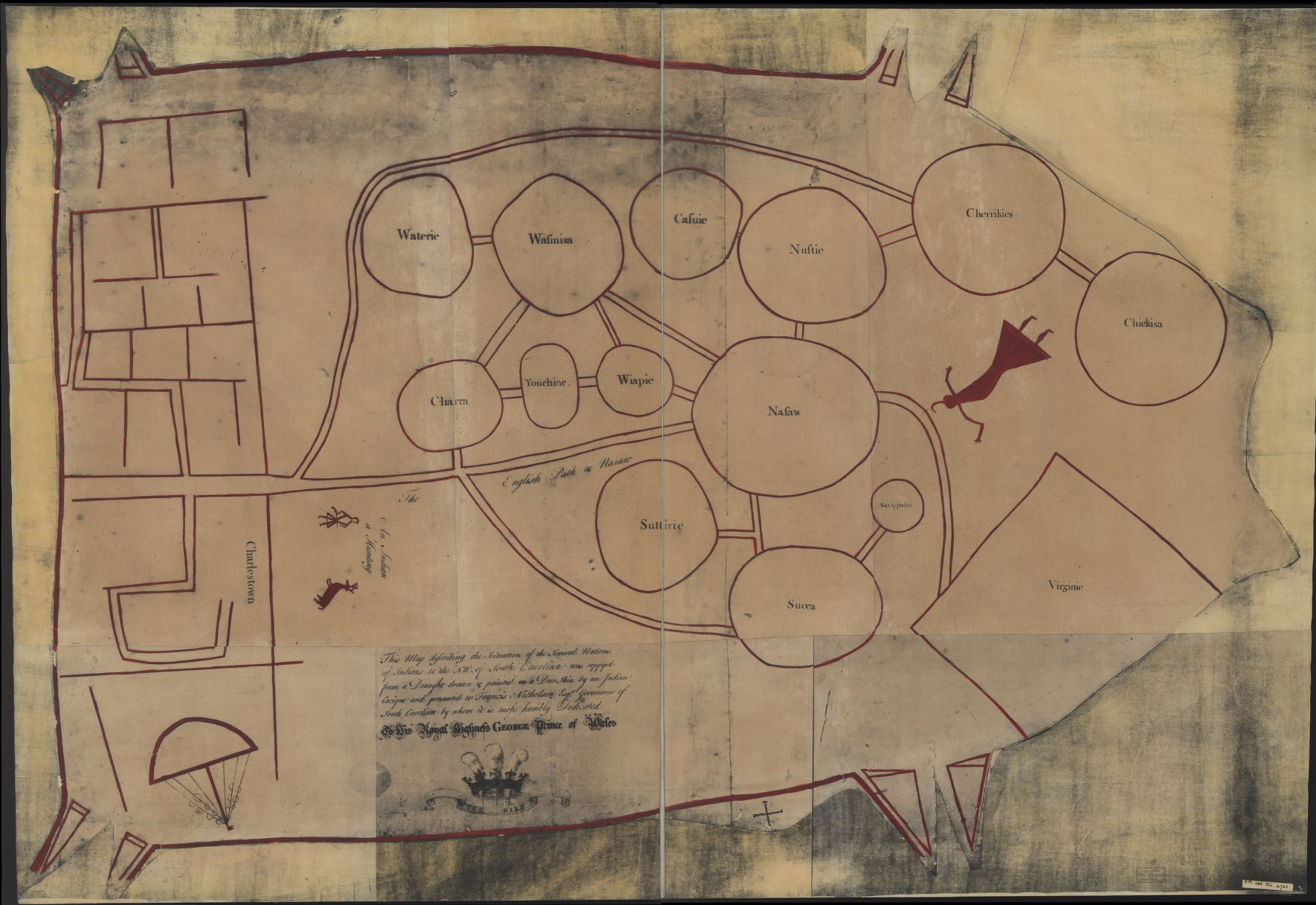
A c. 1724 English copy of a deerskin Catawba map of the tribes between Charleston (left) and Virginia (right) following the displacements of a century of disease and enslavement and the 1715–7 Yamasee War. The Chickasaw are labeled as "Chickisa".

The origin of the Chickasaw is uncertain; 20th-century scholars, such as the archaeologist Patricia Galloway, theorize that the Chickasaw and Choctaw split into distinct peoples in the 17th century from the remains of Plaquemine culture and other groups whose ancestors had lived in the lower Mississippi Valley for thousands of years. When Europeans first encountered them, the Chickasaw were living in villages in what is now northeastern Mississippi.

The Chickasaw are believed to have migrated into Mississippi from the west, as their oral history attests. They and the Choctaw were once one people and migrated from west of the Mississippi River into present-day Mississippi in prehistoric times; the Chickasaw and Choctaw split along the way. The Mississippian Ideological Interaction Sphere spanned the Eastern Woodlands. The Mississippian cultures emerged from previous moundbuilding societies by 880 CE. They built complex, dense villages supporting a stratified society, with centers throughout the Mississippi and Ohio River Valleys and their tributaries.

In the 15th century, proto-Chickasaw people left the Tombigbee Valley after the collapse of the Moundville chiefdom. Chickasaw culture believe that the foundation of Chickasaw from proto-Chickasaw peoples was determined by the Mississippi River. The Mississippi River is referred to as Sakti Lhafa' Okhina in Chikashanompa', which means "scored bluff waterway," known today as the Chickasaw Bluffs. Settling upon the river provided the people with a symbolic sense of new beginngings, washing away the past of the proto-Chickasaw and entering into a new modern age of the Chickasaw. The migration marked their split from other Native American communities like the Choctaws. They settled into the upper Yazoo and Pearl River valleys in present-day Mississippi. Historian Arrell Gibson and anthropologist John R. Swanton believed the Chickasaw Old Fields were in Madison County, Alabama.

The Chicasaws [sic], they being (although a small tribe) accounted the mother nation on this part of the continent, and their language, universally adopted by most, if not all the western [American Indian] nations.

— Bernard Romans, Natural History of East and West Florida

The Choctaws relayed to Bernard Romans their creation myth, saying that they came "out of a hole in the ground, which they shew between their nation and the Chickasaws." Another version of the Chickasaw creation story is that they arose at Nanih Waiya, a great earthwork mound built about 300 CE by Woodland peoples. It is also sacred to the Choctaw, who share a similar story. The mound was built about 1400 years before the coalescence of each of these peoples as ethnic groups.

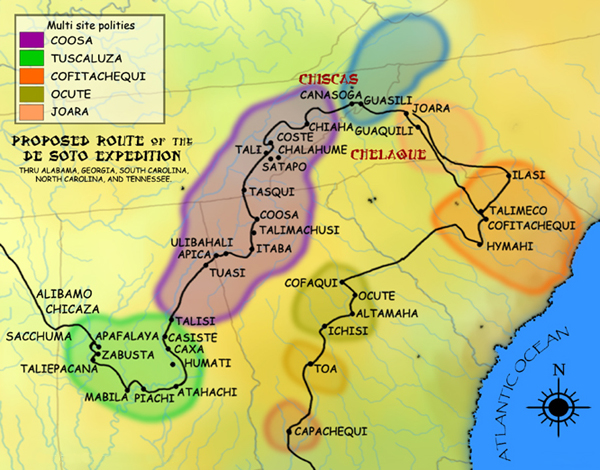
The second leg of the de Soto Expedition, from Apalachee to the Chicaza

The first European contact with the Chickasaw was in 1540 when Spanish explorer Hernando de Soto encountered the tribe and stayed in one of their towns, most likely near present-day Starkville, Mississippi. The Chickasaw were alert around the Spanish, placing war banners implying their intentions for when they would meet the Spanish. The Chickasaw additionally gathered intel that the Spanish recently fought a nearly-lost battle in the town of Mabila, led by leader Tascalusa, only a few months prior to the Spanish entering their territory. In the winter of 1540, conflict finally struck between Chickasaw warriors and the Spanish Explorers. The reasonings for the battle vary from Spanish looting Chickasaw food storages, to general heated animosity between the two groups. After various disagreements, the Chickasaw attacked the De Soto expedition in a nighttime raid, nearly destroying the force. The Spanish moved on quickly.

The Chickasaw began to establish trading relationships with English colonists in the Province of Carolina after that colony was established in 1670. After acquiring firearms from colonial merchants in Carolina, Chickasaw raiders began to attack settlements belonging to a rival tribe, the Choctaw, in order to acquire captives which they sold to the colonists. These raids largely subsided after the Choctaw acquired firearms of their own from the French.

Allied with British colonists in the Southern Colonies, the Chickasaw were often at war with the French and the Choctaw in the 18th century, such as in the Battle of Ackia on May 26, 1736. Skirmishes continued until France ceded its claims to the region east of the Mississippi River after being defeated by the British in the Seven Years' War (called the French and Indian War in North America).

Following the American Revolutionary War, in 1793–94, the Chickasaw under Chief Piomingo fought as allies of the new United States under General Anthony Wayne against the Indians of the old Northwest Territory. The Shawnee and other allied Northwest Indians were defeated in the Battle of Fallen Timbers on August 20, 1794.

A 19th-century historian, Horatio Cushman, wrote, "Neither the Choctaws nor Chicksaws ever engaged in war against the American people, but always stood as their faithful allies." Cushman believed the Chickasaw, along with the Choctaw, may have had origins in present-day Mexico and migrated north. Frenchman Le Clerc Milfort, when writing about the Creek Indians, echoed the same view. That theory, however, does not have consensus; archeological research, as noted above, has revealed the peoples had long histories in the Mississippi area and independently developed complex cultures.

== Trade ==
Despite being smaller than many surrounding tribes, the Chickasaw established themselves as a trade power within the region. Aided by their strategic location on the Mississippi, the tribe was able to exchange goods with neighboring parties. The tactical importance of the Chickasaw was not lost on the British; in 1755, the Imperial Indian Superintendent Edmund Atkin recognized the tribe's position: "It is not possible to cast an Eye ever so lightly over a Map, without being struck with the Importance of the [Chickasaws'] situation."

The Chickasaw made their first formal contact with the British shortly after the founding of Charles Town in 1670; this occurred when Dr. Woordward of Carolina attempted to establish trade ties while on course to Alabama. Although the British outpost of Charles Town was located over 850 km from Chickasaw territory, the two groups managed to engage initially in an exchange of deerskin. Shortly after making contact with the British, the Chickasaw began to trade with the French as the Europeans established themselves within Louisiana.

Within Chickasaw society, trade was categorized under either white (peace) or red (war) routes. To maintain this duality, a War Chief and Peace chief oversaw the respective red and white divisions. Over time, the French union would be dictated by the leaders of the white division, while the English relationship was defined by the red. Ultimately, despite French proximity to Chickasaw land, the tribe elected to prioritize their trade routes with the British. The alliance between the British and the Chickasaw was a strategic defense against the French and their native allies. Supported by the slave trade, the Chickasaw sought weapons in exchange for captured members of rival tribes. As they were smaller than the Choctaw and other abutting Indigenous groups, the weapons were critical to the defense of their native land.

== Tribal lands ==
In 1797, a general appraisal of the tribe and its territorial bounds was made by Abraham Bishop of New Haven, who wrote:

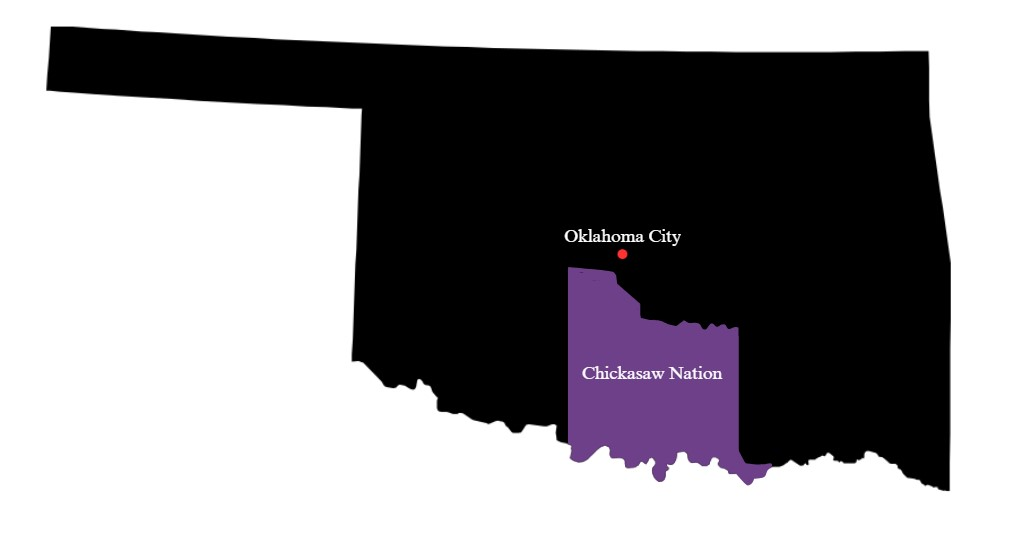
Map of modern Chickasaw territory.

The Chickasaws are a nation of Indians who inhabit the country on the east side of the Mississippi, on the head branches of the Tombeckbe [sic], Mobile [sic], and Yazoo rivers. Their country is an extensive plain, tolerably well watered from springs, and a pretty good soil. They have seven towns, and their number of fighting men is estimated at 575.

=== United States relations ===
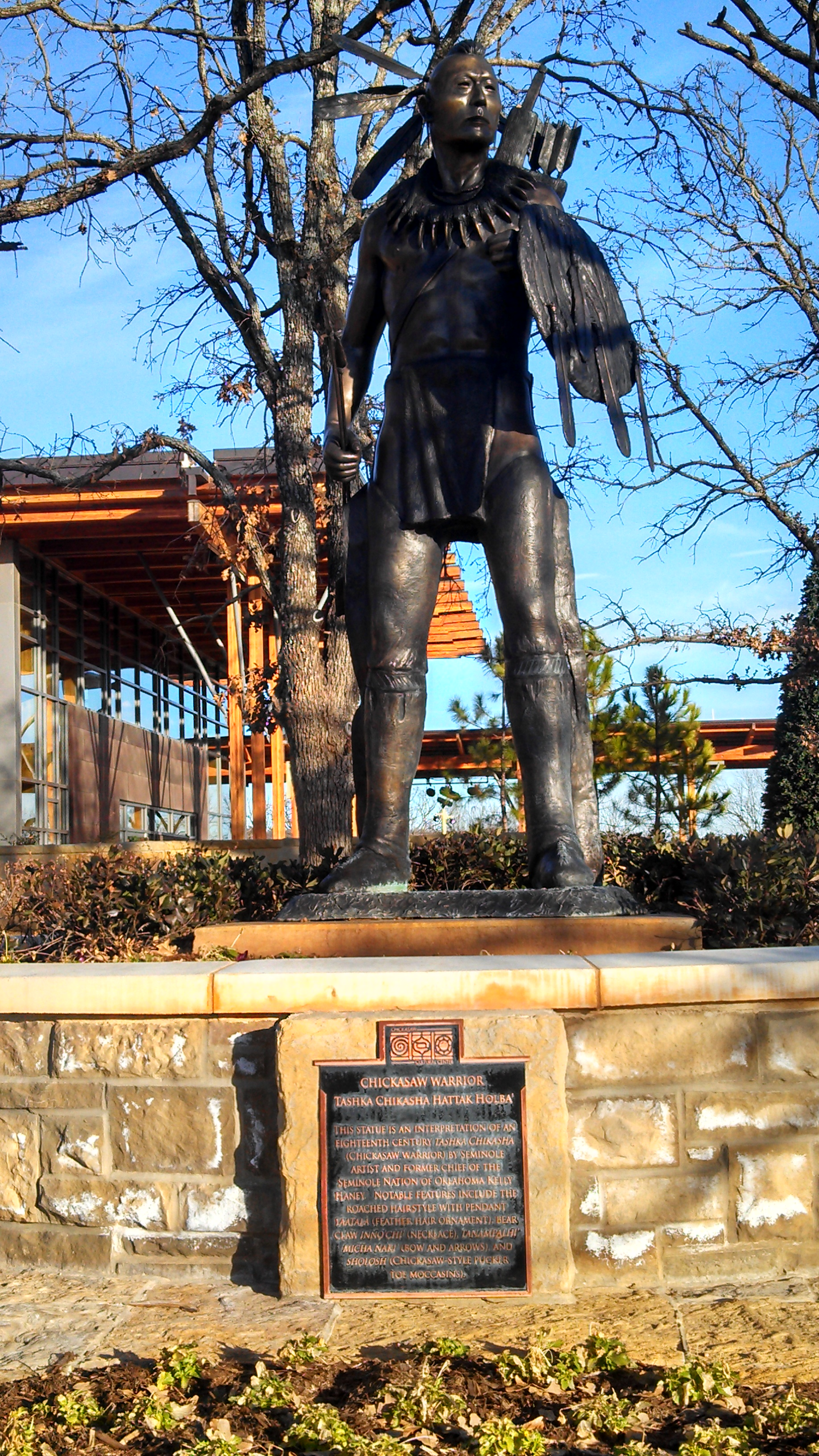
Sculpture of a stylized 18th-century Chickasaw warrior by Enoch Kelly Haney, at the Chickasaw Cultural Center in Oklahoma

George Washington (first U.S. President) and Henry Knox (first U.S. Secretary of War) proposed the cultural transformation of Native Americans. Washington believed that Native Americans were equals, but that their society was inferior. He formulated a policy to encourage the "civilizing" process, and Thomas Jefferson continued it. Historian Robert Remini wrote, "They presumed that once the Indians adopted the practice of private property, built homes, farmed, educated their children, and embraced Christianity, these Native Americans would win acceptance from white Americans." Washington's six-point plan included impartial justice toward Indians; regulated buying of Indian lands; promotion of commerce; promotion of experiments to civilize or improve Indian society; presidential authority to give presents; and punishing those who violated Indian rights. The government-appointed Indian agents, such as Benjamin Hawkins, who became Superintendent of Indian Affairs for all the territory south of the Ohio River. He and other agents lived among the Indians to teach them, through example and instruction, how to live like whites. Hawkins married a Muscogee Creek woman and lived with her people for decades. In the 19th century, the Chickasaw increasingly adopted European-American practices, as they established schools, adopted yeoman farming practices, converted to Christianity, and built homes in styles like their European-American neighbors.

Due to settlers encroaching into Chickasaw territory, the United States constructed Fort Hampton in 1810 in present-day Limestone County, Alabama. The fort was designed to keep settlers out of Chickasaw territory and was one of the few forts constructed in the United States to protect Native American land claims.

==== Treaty of Hopewell (1786) ====
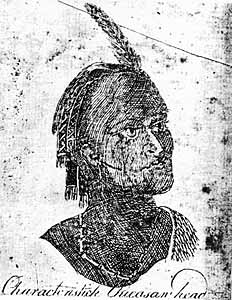
A sketch of a Chickasaw by Bernard Romans, 1775

The Chickasaw signed the Treaty of Hopewell in 1786. Article 11 of that treaty states: "The hatchet shall be forever buried, and the peace given by the United States of America, and friendship re-established between the said States on the one part, and the Chickasaw nation on the other part, shall be universal, and the contracting parties shall use their utmost endeavors to maintain the peace given as aforesaid, and friendship re-established." Benjamin Hawkins attended this signing.

==== Treaty of 1818 ====
In 1818, leaders of the Chickasaw signed several treaties, including the Treaty of Tuscaloosa, which ceded all claims to land north of the southern border of Tennessee up to the Ohio River (the southern border of Indiana and the Illinois Territory). This was known as the "Jackson Purchase." The Chickasaw were allowed to retain a four-square-mile reservation but were required to lease the land to European immigrants.

==== Colbert legacy (19th century) ====
In the mid-18th century, an American-born trader of Scots and Chickasaw ancestry by the name of James Logan Colbert settled in the Muscle Shoals area of Alabama. He lived there for the next 40 years, where he married three high-ranking Chickasaw women in succession. Chickasaw chiefs and high-status women found such marriages of strategic benefit to the tribe, as it gave them advantages with traders over other groups. Colbert and his wives had numerous children, including seven sons: William, Jonathan, George, Levi, Samuel, Joseph, and Pittman (or James). Six survived to adulthood (Jonathan died young.)

The Chickasaw had a matrilineal system, in which children were considered born into the mother's clan; and they gained their status in the tribe from her family. Property and hereditary leadership passed through the maternal line, and the mother's eldest brother was the main male mentor of the children, especially of boys. Because of the status of their mothers, for nearly a century, the Colbert-Chickasaw sons and their descendants provided critical leadership during the tribe's greatest challenges. They had the advantage of growing up bilingual.

Of these six sons, William "Chooshemataha" Colbert (named after James Logan's father, Chief/Major William d'Blainville "Piomingo" Colbert) served with General Andrew Jackson during the Creek Wars of 1813–14. He also had served during the Revolutionary wars and received a commission from President George Washington in 1786 along with his namesake grandfather. His brothers Levi ("Itawamba Mingo") and George Colbert ("Tootesmastube") also had military service in support of the United States. In addition, the two each served as interpreters and negotiators for chiefs of the tribe during the period of removal. Levi Colbert served as principal chief, which may have been a designation by the Americans, who did not understand the decentralized nature of the chiefs' council, based on the tribe reaching broad consensus for major decisions. An example is that more than 40 chiefs from the Chickasaw Council, representing clans and villages, signed a letter in November 1832 by Levi Colbert to President Andrew Jackson, complaining about treaty negotiations with his appointee General John Coffee. After Levi's death in 1834, the Chickasaw people were forced upon the Trail of Tears. His brother, George Colbert, reluctantly succeeded him as chief and principal negotiator, because he was bilingual and bicultural. George "Tootesmastube" Colbert never reached the Chickasaw's "Oka Homa" (red waters); he died on Choctaw territory, Fort Towson, en route.

=== Treaty of Pontotoc Creek and Removal (1832-1837) ===
In 1832 after the state of Mississippi declared its jurisdiction over the Chickasaw Indians, outlawing tribal self-governance, Chickasaw chiefs assembled at the national council house on October 20, 1832 and signed the Treaty of Pontotoc Creek, ceding their remaining Mississippi territory to the U.S. and agreeing to find land and relocate west of the Mississippi River. Between 1832 and 1837, the Chickasaw would make further negotiations and arrangements for their removal.

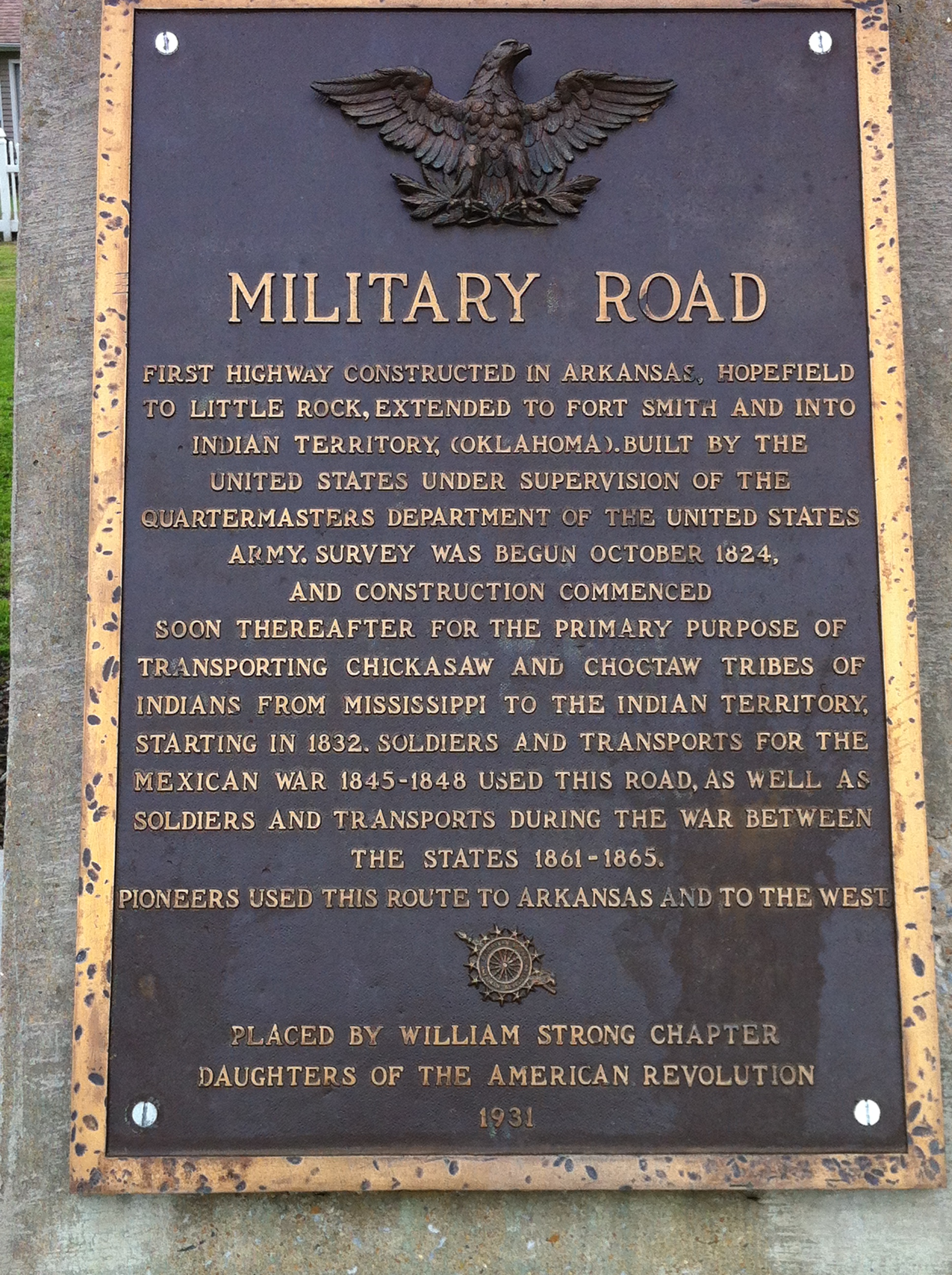
Historic Marker in Marion, Arkansas for the Trail of Tears

Unlike other tribes who received land grants in exchange for ceding territory, the Chickasaw held out for financial compensation: they were to receive $3 million U.S. dollars from the United States for their lands east of the Mississippi River. In 1836 after a bitter five-year debate within the tribe, the Chickasaw had reached an agreement to purchase land in Indian Territory from the previously removed Choctaw. They paid the Choctaw $530,000 for the westernmost part of their land. The first group of Chickasaw moved in 1837.

The Chickasaw gathered at Memphis, Tennessee, on July 4, 1837, with all of their portable assets: belongings, livestock, and enslaved African Americans. Three thousand and one Chickasaw crossed the Mississippi River, following routes established by the Choctaw and Creek. During the journey, often referred to as the Trail of Tears, more than 500 Chickasaw died of dysentery and smallpox.

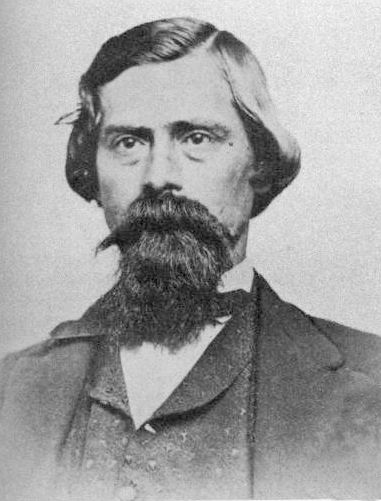
In the 1850s Holmes Colbert (Chickasaw) helped write the constitution of the nation in Indian Territory.

When the Chickasaw reached Indian Territory, the United States began to administer to them through the Choctaw Nation, and later merged them for administrative reasons. The Chickasaw wrote their own constitution in the 1850s, an effort contributed to by Holmes Colbert.

After several decades of mistrust between the two peoples, in the twentieth century, the Chickasaw re-established their independent government. They are federally recognized as the Chickasaw Nation. The government is headquartered in Ada, Oklahoma.

=== American Civil War (1861) ===
The Chickasaw Nation was the first of the Five Civilized Tribes to become allies of the Confederate States of America. In addition, they resented the United States government, which had forced them off their lands and failed to protect them against the Plains tribes in the West. In 1861, as tensions rose related to the sectional conflict, the US Army abandoned Fort Washita, leaving the Chickasaw Nation defenseless against the Plains tribes. Confederate officials recruited the American Indian tribes with suggestions of an Indian state if they were victorious in the Civil War.

The Chickasaw passed a resolution allying with the Confederacy, which was signed by Governor Cyrus Harris on May 25, 1861.

Up to this time, our protection was in the United States troops stationed at Fort Washita, under the command of Colonel Emory. But he, as soon as the Confederate troops had entered our country, at once abandoned us and the Fort; and, to make his flight more expeditious and his escape more sure, employed Black Beaver, a Shawnee Indian, under a promise to him of

five thousand dollars, to pilot him and his troops out of the Indian country safely without a collision with the Texas Confederates; which Black Beaver accomplished. By this act the United States abandoned the Choctaws and Chickasaws. . .

Then, there being- no other alternative by which to save their country and property, they, as the less of the two evils that confronted them, went with the Southern Confederacy.

— Julius Folsom, September 5, 1891, letter to H. B. Cushman

At the beginning of the American Civil War, Albert Pike was appointed as Confederate envoy to Native Americans. In this capacity, he negotiated several treaties, including the Treaty with Choctaws and Chickasaws in July 1861. The treaty covered sixty-four terms, covering many subjects such as Choctaw and Chickasaw nation sovereignty, Confederate States of America citizenship possibilities and an entitled delegate in the House of Representatives of the Confederate States of America. Because the Chickasaw sided with the Confederate States of America during the American Civil War, they had to forfeit some of their land afterward. In addition, the US renegotiated their treaty, insisting on their emancipation of slaves and offering citizenship to those who wanted to stay in the Chickasaw Nation. If they returned to the United States, they would have US citizenship.

This was the first time in history the Chickasaws have ever made war against an English speaking people.

— Governor Cyrus Harris, As Chickasaw troops marched against the Union, 1860s.

==== Government ====
The Chickasaws were first combined with the Choctaw Nation and their area was called the Chickasaw District. Although originally the western boundary of the Choctaw Nation extended to the 100th meridian, virtually no Chickasaw lived west of the Cross Timbers. The area was subject to continual raiding by the Indians on the Southern Plains. The United States eventually leased the area between the 100th and 98th meridians for the use of the Plains tribes. The area was referred to as the "Leased District".

==== Treaties ====
Treaty	Year	Signed with	Where	Main Purpose	Ceded Land
Treaty with the Chickasaw	1786	United States	Hopwell, SC	Peace and Protection provided by the U.S. and Define boundaries	N/A
Treaty with the Chickasaw	1801	United States	Chickasaw Nation	Right to make wagon road through the Chickasaw Nation, Acknowledge the protection provided by the U.S.	(Not Available yet)
Treaty with the Chickasaw	1805	United States	Chickasaw Nation	Eliminate debt to U.S. merchants and traders	(Not Available yet)
Treaty with the Chickasaw	1816	United States	Chickasaw Nation	Cede land, provide allowances, and tracts reserved to Chickasaw Nation	(Not Available yet)
Treaty of with the Chickasaw	1818	United States	Chickasaw Nation	Cede land, payments for land cession, and Define boundaries	(Not Available yet)
Treaty of Franklin (un-ratified)	1830	United States	Chickasaw Nation, See Hiram Masonic Lodge No. 7	Cede lands east of the Mississippi River and provide protection for the 'weak' tribe	(Not Available yet)
Treaty of Pontotoc	1832	United States	Chickasaw Nation	Removal and Monetary gain from the sale of land	6,422,400 acres (25,991 km^{2}).

==== Post–Civil War ====
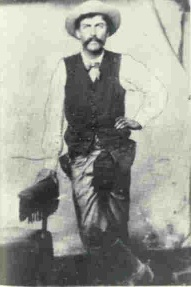
Fred Tecumseh Waite, a cowboy and Chickasaw Nation statesman

Because the Chickasaw allied with the Confederacy, after the Civil War the United States government required the nation to make a new peace treaty in 1866. It included the provision that they emancipate the enslaved African Americans and provide full citizenship to those who wanted to stay in the Chickasaw Nation.

These people and their descendants became known as the Chickasaw Freedmen. Descendants of the Freedmen continue to live in Oklahoma. Today, the Choctaw-Chickasaw Freedmen Association of Oklahoma represents the interests of Freedmen descendants in both of these tribes.

But the Chickasaw Nation never granted citizenship to the Chickasaw Freedmen. The only way that African Americans could become citizens at that time was to have one or more Chickasaw parents or to petition for citizenship and go through the process available to other non-Natives, even if they were of known partial Chickasaw descent in an earlier generation. Because the Chickasaw Nation did not provide citizenship to their Freedmen after the Civil War (it would have been akin to formal adoption of individuals into the tribe), they were penalized by the U.S. Government. It took more than half of their territory, with no compensation. They lost territory that had been negotiated in treaties in exchange for their use after removal from the Southeast.

== State-recognized groups ==
The Chaloklowa Chickasaw Indian People, an organization that alleges to be composed of descendants of Chickasaw who did not leave the Southeast, were recognized as a "state-recognized group" in 2005 by South Carolina. They are headquartered in Hemingway, South Carolina. Historian Edward J. Cashin, a professor of colonial era history and Director of the Center for the Study of Georgia History at Augusta State University, was unable to ascertain the organization's connection to the Savannah River Chickasaws or other bands of Chickasaw. After receiving letters of complaint concerning the Chaloklowa Chickasaw Indian People's later petition for recognition as a State Recognized tribe in October 2005, the Commission of Minority Affairs review committee, upon rereview, found that the Indigenous ancestry originally being claimed by the group was incorrect. The organization remains recognized as a group as of 2023. In 2003, they unsuccessfully petitioned the US Department of the Interior Bureau of Indian Affairs to try to gain federal recognition as an Indian tribe.

== Culture ==
For many tribes in the region, corn was one of the most important foods. The Green Corn Ceremony, which occurs annually and starts when the corn crops begin to develop, usually in late June or early July, ties corn into the culture of the Chickasaw. This ceremony celebrated both the crop and the sense of community in the tribe. It was also a time of starting from scratch in a sense. Villages were cleaned, old pottery was broken, and most old fires were put out. Fasting was done by most tribes to obtain purity, and the Chickasaw specifically would fast from the afternoon of the first day of the ceremony until the second sunrise.

In 2010, the tribe opened the Chickasaw Cultural Center in Sulphur, Oklahoma. It includes the Chikasha Inchokka' Traditional Village, Honor Garden, Sky and Water pavilion, and several in-depth exhibits about the diverse culture of the Chickasaw. The Chikasha Inchokka' Traditional Village features a Council House, two winter and summer houses, a replica mound, a corn crib and a stickball field. There are often stomp dances or stickball demonstrations, and cultural performers often display traditional Chickasaw culture, including art, cooking, language and storytelling.

To the Chickasaw, the Mississippi River helped "define their geographic homeland and history", and was important for trade, transportation, and irrigation. Referred to as "scored bluff waterway", Chickasaw warriors limited the movement of Europeans along the river.

=== Clans ===
Like other North American peoples, the Chickasaw are traditionally divided into clans:

- Shawi' Iksa' (Raccoon)
- Foshi' Iksa' (Bird)
- Acho' Chaba' Iksa' (Alligator)
- Issi' Ishtaaonchololi' (Deer)
- Kowishto' Losa' Iksa' (Panther)
- Kowimihlha' Iksa' (Wildcat)
- Nani' Iksa' (Fish)
- Chola' Iksa' (Fox)
- Koni' Iksa' (Skunk)
- Fani' Iksa' (Squirrel)
- Nashoba' Iksa' (Wolf)

== Marriage traditions ==
Before marriage, a Chickasaw man would send a gift with his mother or sister to be given to the parents of the woman he would like to marry. If the parents consented, they would offer the gift to the woman. If the woman accepted, the family member of the man would return with the news of approval. The man would put on his finest clothing and apply vermilion, a paint associated with love, power, and purity. The man would go to the house of the woman he wanted to marry, and would have supper alone with his future father-in-law, without the company of the wife or mother-in-law. The bed of the wife would be prepared, and the bride would go to sleep before the groom joined. Once they were both in the same bed, they were officially married.

== Religion ==
The Chickasaw people held ancient beliefs about four "Beloved Things": the sun, the clouds, the sky and Aba' Binni'li, also known as "He Who Sits Above". He was believed to be the sole creator of light, life, and warmth. He was believed to reside both in the clouds and in the holy fire, and due to this, fire was respected. It became unlawful to extinguish any fire, even a small cooking fire, with water, as this was considered to be the work of evil spirits. Bad weather such as rain, thunder and heavy wind was thought to be holy people at war above the clouds. Warriors would fire their guns at the sky to show that they were willing to die if they could aid the holy spirits above.

== Repatriation efforts ==
After they signed the treaty of Pontotoc Creek in 1832 and were forced from their native land in Mississippi, the Chickasaw tribe immigrated to its now-home in Oklahoma. While their current residence is far from their native territory, the ancestral remains of many Chickasaw members are still located in Mississippi, Tennessee, and Alabama. Among these remains, many were excavated and stored within the Mississippi Department of Archives and History (MDAH). In 2021 the MDAH repatriated 403 Chickasaw ancestors to the tribe. The organizations director of archaeology, Meg Cook, addressed the MDAH's efforts: "We're doing everything that we can to reconcile the past and move forward, in a very transparent way. It's our responsibility to tell the Mississippi story. And that means all of the bad parts, too."

== Notable Chickasaw ==
- Bill Anoatubby, Governor of the Chickasaw Nation since 1987
- Kaylea Arnett, professional sporting diver
- Jack Brisco and Jerry Brisco, pro wrestling tag team
- Jodi Byrd, Literary and political theorist
- Edwin Carewe (1883–1940), movie actor and director
- Charles David Carter, Democratic U. S. Congressman from Oklahoma
- Levi Colbert, Chickasaw language translator
- Tom Cole, Republican U.S. Congressman from Oklahoma
- Molly Culver, actress
- Kent DuChaine, American Blues singer and guitarist
- Hiawatha Estes, architect
- Bee Ho Gray, actor
- John Herrington, astronaut; first Native American in space
- Linda Hogan, Writer-in-Residence of the Chickasaw Nation
- Miko Hughes, actor
- Sippia Paul Hull, early settler of Pauls Valley, Oklahoma
- Kyle Keller, Head Men's Basketball Coach, Stephen F. Austin Lumberjacks
- Neal A. McCaleb, Assistant U.S. Secretary for Indian Affairs (overseeing the BIA) under George W. Bush
- Wahoo McDaniel, pro wrestler, American Football League player
- Leona Mitchell, opera singer
- Rodd Redwing, actor
- Rebecca Sandefur, Sociologist and MacArthur Fellow
- Jerod Impichchaachaaha' Tate, composer and pianist
- Te Ata, traditional Indian storyteller and actress
- Fred Waite, cowboy and Chickasaw Nation statesman
- Kevin K. Washburn, Assistant U.S. Secretary for Indian Affairs under Barack Obama
- Montford Johnson, famous cattle rancher. In April 2020, Montford was inducted into the Hall of Great Westerners of the National Cowboy & Western Heritage Museum.[35]
- Stephanie Byers, Kansas State Legislator. In November 2020, Stephanie Byers, a retired music educator, became the first transgender Native American elected to a state legislature anywhere in the United States.

== Population history ==
The tribal traditions say that the Chickasaw once had 10,000 men fit for war. In 1687 Louis Hennepin estimated the Chickasaw population as at least 4,000 warriors (and therefore at least 20,000 people). In 1702 according to Iberville there were ca. 2,000 Chickasaw families. Their number then decreased a lot during the 18th century and early 19th century, including the Trail of Tears. Indian Affairs 1836 reported the number of the Chickasaw in year 1836 at around 5,400 people (another source says that the pre-removal population was 4,914 Chickasaws and 1,156 Black slaves). A report by the Commissioner of Indian Affairs dated 25 November 1841 says that around 4,600 Chickasaws already lived in Oklahoma (Indian Territory) while around 400 stayed in the east. In 1875 the Office of Indian Affairs reported that there were around 6,000 Chickasaws. This figure of 6,000 continued to be reported in 1886 and in all subsequent reports until 1897. Indian Affairs 1910 reported that there were 5,688 Chickasaws by blood, 645 by intermarriage and 4,651 freedmen. While the census of 1910 counted only 4,204 Chickasaws.

Chickasaw population has rebounded in the 20th and 21st centuries. In 2020 they numbered 70,096 (including 32,579 in Oklahoma).

== See also ==
- Chickasaw Nation
- Chickasaw language
- List of sites and peoples visited by the Hernando de Soto Expedition
- Chickasaw Wars
- Pashofa
- Perry Cohea
