= National Register of Historic Places listings in Pontotoc County, Oklahoma =

Location of Pontotoc County in Oklahoma

This is a list of the National Register of Historic Places listings in Pontotoc County, Oklahoma.

This is intended to be a complete list of the properties and districts on the National Register of Historic Places in Pontotoc County, Oklahoma, United States. The locations of National Register properties and districts for which the latitude and longitude coordinates are included below, may be seen in a map.

There are 9 properties and districts listed on the National Register in the county.

This National Park Service list is complete through NPS recent listings posted May 1, 2026.

== Current listings ==
	Name on the Register	Image	Date listed	Location	City or town	Description
1	Ada Arts and Heritage Center	Ada Arts and Heritage Center	November 13, 1989 (#89001950)	400 S. Rennie; 34°46′16″N 96°40′35″W	Ada	
2	Bebee Field Round House		August 5, 1985 (#85001699)	State Highway 13; 34°51′57″N 96°49′23″W	Ada	
3	East Central State Normal School	East Central State Normal School	December 23, 1986 (#86003470)	East Central University campus 34°46′28″N 96°39′51″W	Ada	
4	F.W. Meaders House		April 4, 2007 (#07000258)	521 South Broadway; 34°46′10″N 96°40′44″W	Ada	
5	Mijo Camp Industrial District		September 26, 1985 (#85002560)	Northern side of Pontotoc County Road 148; 34°52′10″N 96°48′30″W	Ada	
6	Pontotoc County Courthouse	Pontotoc County Courthouse	August 24, 1984 (#84003418)	120 W. 13th St. 34°46′21″N 96°40′46″W	Ada	
7	Roff Armory	Roff Armory	September 18, 1997 (#97001151)	Junction of Burns and N. 9th Sts. 34°37′41″N 96°50′33″W	Roff	
8	Sugg Clinic	Sugg Clinic	November 30, 1999 (#99001426)	100 E. 13th St. 34°46′20″N 96°40′41″W	Ada	
9	Wintersmith Park Historic District	Wintersmith Park Historic District	June 2, 2000 (#00000623)	E. 18th St. and Scenic Dr. 34°45′38″N 96°39′09″W	Ada	

== See also ==
- List of National Historic Landmarks in Oklahoma
- National Register of Historic Places listings in Oklahoma
