= Pontotoc County, Oklahoma =

County in Oklahoma, United States

- County
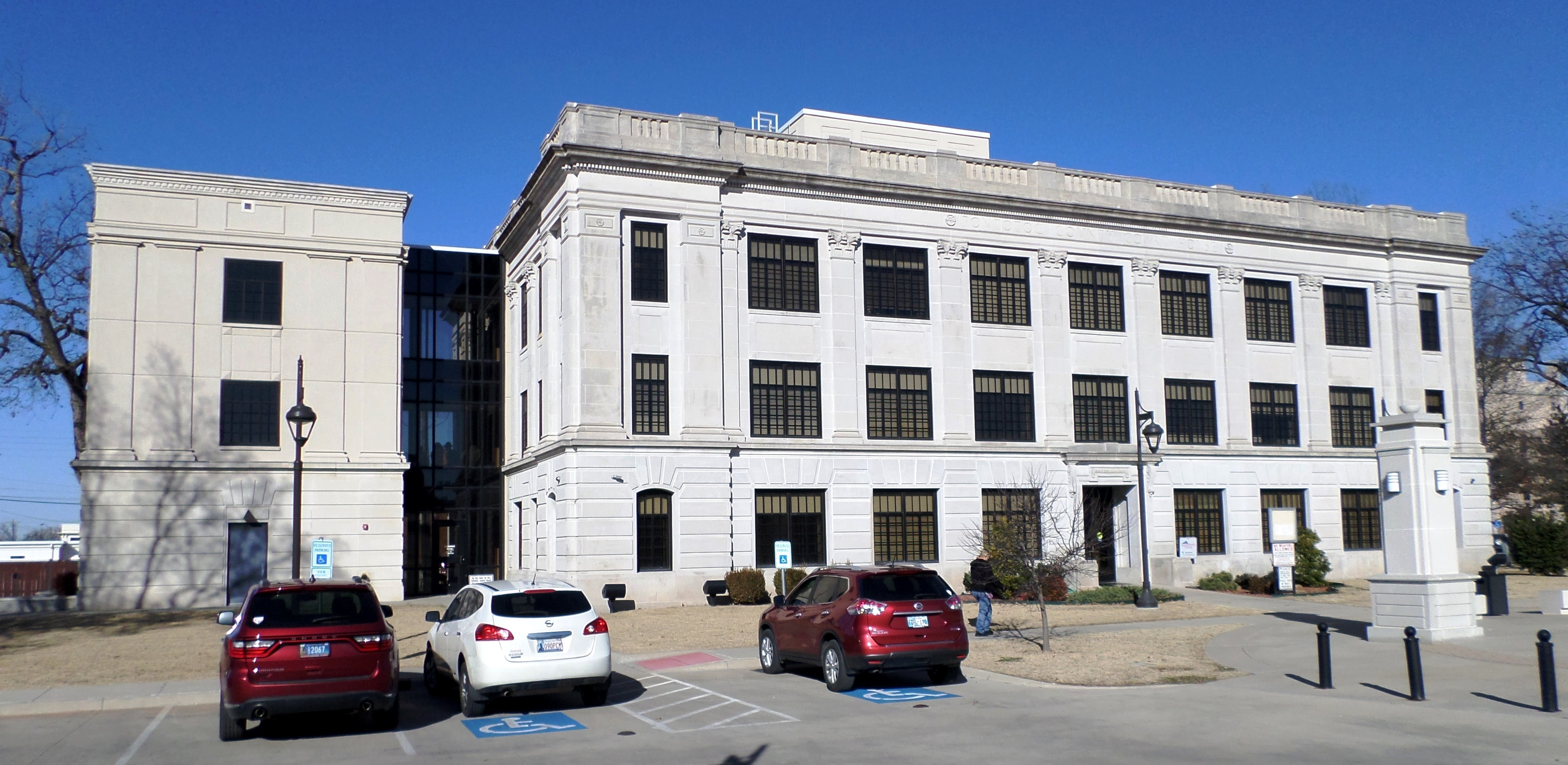
- Pontotoc County Courthouse in Ada

- Location within the U.S. state of Oklahoma
- Coordinates: 34°43′N 96°41′W
- Country: United States
- State: Oklahoma
- Founded: 1907
- Named for: Chickasaw word for the region meaning either "cattail prairie" "land of hanging grapes"
- Seat: Ada
- Largest city: Ada

Area
  - Total: 725 sq mi (1,880 km^{2})
  - Land: 720 sq mi (1,900 km^{2})
  - Water: 4.8 sq mi (12 km^{2}) 0.7%

Population (2020)
  - Total: 38,065
  - Estimate (2025): 38,528 ▲
  - Density: 53/sq mi (20/km^{2})
- Congressional district: 4th

Pontotoc County is a county in the south central part of Oklahoma. As of the 2020 census, the population was 38,065. Its county seat is Ada. The county was created at statehood from part of the Chickasaw Nation in Indian Territory. It was named for a historic Chickasaw tribal area in Mississippi. According to the Encyclopedia of Oklahoma History and Culture, Pontotoc is usually translated "cattail prairie" or "land of hanging grapes."

Pontotoc County comprises the Ada, OK micropolitan statistical area.

The Chickasaw Nation's headquarters are in Ada.

== History ==
The present Pontotoc County was part of the land that the U.S. government granted in 1830 to the Choctaw tribe via the Treaty of Dancing Rabbit Creek. In 1837, the Chickasaw tribe was granted land within the Choctaw domain. In 1857, the Chickasaw Nation formed its own government on this land. However, few Chickasaw settled there until after the Civil War, mainly because of attacks by various Plains Indian tribes.

The first settlers were located in the vicinity of Boggy Depot during the 1840s. Camp Arbuckle was established to protect migrants traveling on the California Road. After the Civil War, settlements began spreading through the area. Some of the new settlers were illegal white intruders and outlaws. The first post office was established at Stonewall in 1878. The town of Ada was founded in 1890. After three railroads built lines through Ada, it became the dominant community of the area. Ada was named county seat when Pontotoc County was created.

== Geography ==
According to the U.S. Census Bureau, the county has a total area of 725 square miles (1,880 km^{2}), of which 720 square miles (1,900 km^{2}) is land and 4.8 square miles (12 km^{2}) (0.7%) is water. The Canadian River forms the northern boundary.

=== Adjacent counties ===
- Seminole County (north)
- Hughes County (northeast)
- Coal County (southeast)
- Johnston County (south)
- Murray County (southwest)
- Garvin County (west)
- McClain County (northwest)
- Pottawatomie County (northwest)

== Demographics ==
Historical population
Census	Pop.	Note	%±
1910	24,331		—
1920	30,949		27.2%
1930	32,469		4.9%
1940	39,792		22.6%
1950	30,875		−22.4%
1960	28,089		−9.0%
1970	27,867		−0.8%
1980	32,598		17.0%
1990	34,119		4.7%
2000	35,143		3.0%
2010	37,492		6.7%
2020	38,065		1.5%
2025 (est.)	38,528	▲	1.2%
U.S. Decennial Census; 1790-1960 1900-1990; 1990-2000 2010

=== 2020 census ===
As of the 2020 census, the county had a population of 38,065. Of the residents, 23.9% were under the age of 18 and 17.2% were 65 years of age or older; the median age was 37.5 years. For every 100 females there were 94.3 males, and for every 100 females age 18 and over there were 91.4 males.

The racial makeup of the county was 61.1% White, 2.3% Black or African American, 18.8% American Indian and Alaska Native, 1.0% Asian, 2.0% from some other race, and 14.7% from two or more races. Hispanic or Latino residents of any race comprised 5.8% of the population.

There were 15,179 households in the county, of which 31.6% had children under the age of 18 living with them and 29.4% had a female householder with no spouse or partner present. About 29.6% of all households were made up of individuals and 12.3% had someone living alone who was 65 years of age or older.

There were 17,406 housing units, of which 12.8% were vacant. Among occupied housing units, 63.3% were owner-occupied and 36.7% were renter-occupied. The homeowner vacancy rate was 2.7% and the rental vacancy rate was 11.3%.

=== 2010 census ===
As of the 2010 United States census, there were 37,492 people living in the county; 71.2% were White, 17.4% Native American, 2.4% Black or African American, 0.7% Asian, 1.1% of some other race and 7.2% of two or more races; 4.1% were Hispanic or Latino (of any race).

=== 2000 census ===
As of the census of 2000, there were 35,143 people, 13,978 households, and 9,421 families living in the county. The population density was 19/km^{2} (49/mi^{2}). There were 15,575 housing units at an average density of 8/km^{2} (21/mi^{2}). The racial makeup of the county was 75.80% White, 2.06% Black or African American, 15.51% Native American, 0.46% Asian, 0.02% Pacific Islander, 0.79% from other races, and 5.36% from two or more races. 2.30% of the population were Hispanic or Latino of any race.

There were 13,978 households, out of which 30.80% had children under the age of 18 living with them, 52.90% were married couples living together, 10.80% had a female householder with no husband present, and 32.60% were non-families. 28.10% of all households were made up of individuals, and 12.30% had someone living alone who was 65 years of age or older. The average household size was 2.44 and the average family size was 2.98.

In the county, the population was spread out, with 24.70% under the age of 18, 12.50% from 18 to 24, 26.00% from 25 to 44, 21.90% from 45 to 64, and 15.00% who were 65 years of age or older. The median age was 36 years. For every 100 females there were 93.30 males. For every 100 females age 18 and over, there were 90.60 males.

The median income for a household in the county was $26,955, and the median income for a family was $35,400. Males had a median income of $26,785 versus $18,939 for females. The per capita income for the county was $14,664. About 11.80% of families and 16.50% of the population were below the poverty line, including 20.10% of those under age 18 and 11.70% of those age 65 or over.

== Politics ==
Voter Registration and Party Enrollment as of June 30, 2023
Party	Number of Voters	Percentage
Democratic	7,241	32.77%
Republican	11,072	50.10%
Others	3,786	17.13%
Total	22,099	100%

United States presidential election results for Pontotoc County, Oklahoma
Year	Republican		Democratic		Third party(ies)	
Year	No.	%	No.	%	No.	%
1908	860	26.20%	1,841	56.09%	581	17.70%
1912	642	18.77%	1,842	53.84%	937	27.39%
1916	913	21.29%	2,418	56.39%	957	22.32%
1920	2,370	37.17%	3,800	59.60%	206	3.23%
1924	1,859	28.08%	4,268	64.47%	493	7.45%
1928	3,356	50.87%	3,203	48.55%	38	0.58%
1932	1,207	14.31%	7,227	85.69%	0	0.00%
1936	2,015	19.88%	8,079	79.71%	42	0.41%
1940	3,449	26.96%	9,310	72.77%	35	0.27%
1944	2,960	31.05%	6,552	68.73%	21	0.22%
1948	2,289	22.80%	7,750	77.20%	0	0.00%
1952	5,389	42.78%	7,208	57.22%	0	0.00%
1956	4,814	44.72%	5,950	55.28%	0	0.00%
1960	5,863	55.75%	4,654	44.25%	0	0.00%
1964	4,166	35.87%	7,449	64.13%	0	0.00%
1968	4,161	38.26%	4,291	39.45%	2,425	22.29%
1972	8,762	72.04%	3,160	25.98%	240	1.97%
1976	4,895	39.20%	7,466	59.79%	125	1.00%
1980	6,232	49.34%	5,942	47.04%	457	3.62%
1984	8,301	59.69%	5,526	39.74%	80	0.58%
1988	6,609	49.92%	6,484	48.98%	146	1.10%
1992	5,206	33.54%	6,350	40.91%	3,965	25.55%
1996	5,366	39.42%	6,470	47.53%	1,777	13.05%
2000	7,299	56.86%	5,387	41.97%	150	1.17%
2004	9,647	65.13%	5,165	34.87%	0	0.00%
2008	9,750	68.36%	4,512	31.64%	0	0.00%
2012	8,945	69.38%	3,947	30.62%	0	0.00%
2016	10,431	70.33%	3,637	24.52%	763	5.14%
2020	10,805	70.53%	4,117	26.87%	398	2.60%
2024	10,967	72.27%	3,895	25.67%	312	2.06%

== Economy ==
Cattle ranching was one of the most important economic activities in this area up through the territorial period. Agriculture rose to prominence in the early 20th century, with cotton being the most important crop. Cattle raising reemerged as the major industry, and the county is sometimes called "Hereford Heaven."

Other important economic activities include limestone quarrying, cement production, light manufacturing, services and government. The city of Ada is the headquarters of the Chickasaw Nation, and the base of the Carl Albert Indian Health System.

== Communities ==
=== City ===
- Ada (county seat)

=== Towns ===
- Allen
- Byng
- Fitzhugh
- Francis
- Roff
- Stonewall

=== Census-designated places ===
- Fittstown
- Latta
- Pickett
- Vanoss

=== Other unincorporated places ===
- Gaar Corner
- Happyland
- Harden City
- Jesse

== Education ==
School districts include:

- Ada Public Schools
- Allen Public Schools
- Asher Public Schools
- Byng Public Schools
- Latta Public Schools
- Roff Public Schools
- Stonewall Public Schools
- Stratford Public Schools
- Tupelo Public Schools
- Vanoss Public Schools

== Transportation ==
=== Major highways ===
- US 177
- US 377 / SH-99
  - SH-99A
- SH-1
- SH-3
  - SH-3E
  - SH-3W
- SH-19
- SH-48
- SH-59A
- Chickasaw Turnpike

== NRHP sites ==
The following sites in Pontotoc County are listed on the National Register of Historic Places:

- Ada Arts and Heritage Center, Ada
- Bebee Field Round House, Ada
- East Central State Normal School, Ada
- F.W. Meaders House, Ada
- Mijo Camp Industrial District, Ada
- Pontotoc County Courthouse, Ada
- Roff Armory, Roff
- Sugg Clinic, Ada
- Wintersmith Park Historic District, Ada

== See also ==
- Chimney Hill (Oklahoma)
