= Pickett, Oklahoma =

- Census-designated place
- Location within Oklahoma Location within the United States
- Coordinates: 34°46′46″N 96°46′32″W
- Country: United States
- State: Oklahoma
- County: Pontotoc

Area
  - Total: 3.23 sq mi (8.37 km^{2})
  - Land: 3.23 sq mi (8.37 km^{2})
  - Water: 0 sq mi (0.00 km^{2})
- Elevation: 997 ft (304 m)

Population (2020)
  - Total: 774
  - Density: 239.7/sq mi (92.53/km^{2})
- Time zone: UTC-6 (Central (CST))
  - Summer (DST): UTC-5 (CDT)
- ZIP Code: 74820 (Ada)
- Area code: 580
- FIPS code: 40-58650
- GNIS feature ID: 2812868

Pickett is an unincorporated community and census-designated place (CDP) in Pontotoc County, Oklahoma, United States. It was first listed as a CDP prior to the 2020 census. As of the 2020 census, Pickett had a population of 774.

The CDP is in west-central Pontotoc County, along Oklahoma State Highway 19, which leads east 5 miles (8 km) to Ada, the county seat, and west 10 miles (16 km) to Stratford.

== Demographics ==
Historical population
Census	Pop.	Note	%±
2020	774		—
U.S. Decennial Census

=== 2020 census ===
As of the 2020 census, Pickett had a population of 774. The median age was 38.9 years. 24.9% of residents were under the age of 18 and 17.6% of residents were 65 years of age or older. For every 100 females there were 86.5 males, and for every 100 females age 18 and over there were 83.3 males age 18 and over.

0.0% of residents lived in urban areas, while 100.0% lived in rural areas.

There were 304 households in Pickett, of which 24.0% had children under the age of 18 living in them. Of all households, 53.9% were married-couple households, 17.8% were households with a male householder and no spouse or partner present, and 24.7% were households with a female householder and no spouse or partner present. About 28.9% of all households were made up of individuals and 13.5% had someone living alone who was 65 years of age or older.

There were 323 housing units, of which 5.9% were vacant. The homeowner vacancy rate was 0.0% and the rental vacancy rate was 1.7%.

Racial composition as of the 2020 census
Race	Number	Percent
White	417	53.9%
Black or African American	7	0.9%
American Indian and Alaska Native	215	27.8%
Asian	0	0.0%
Native Hawaiian and Other Pacific Islander	0	0.0%
Some other race	10	1.3%
Two or more races	125	16.1%
Hispanic or Latino (of any race)	62	8.0%

== Education ==
It is within the Vanoss Public Schools school district.
