= Science Hall =

Science Hall may refer to:

- Science Hall (Indianola, Iowa), listed on the National Register of Historic Places (NRHP)
- Science Hall (Ada, Oklahoma), listed on the NRHP
- Science Hall (Alva, Oklahoma), listed on the NRHP
- Science Hall (Hays, Texas), a ghost town
- Science Hall (Jasper, Texas), an unincorporated community in Texas
- Shanghai Science Hall, Shanghai, China
- University of Wisconsin Science Hall, Madison, Wisconsin, listed on the NRHP
