= Prepayment for service =

Business model term

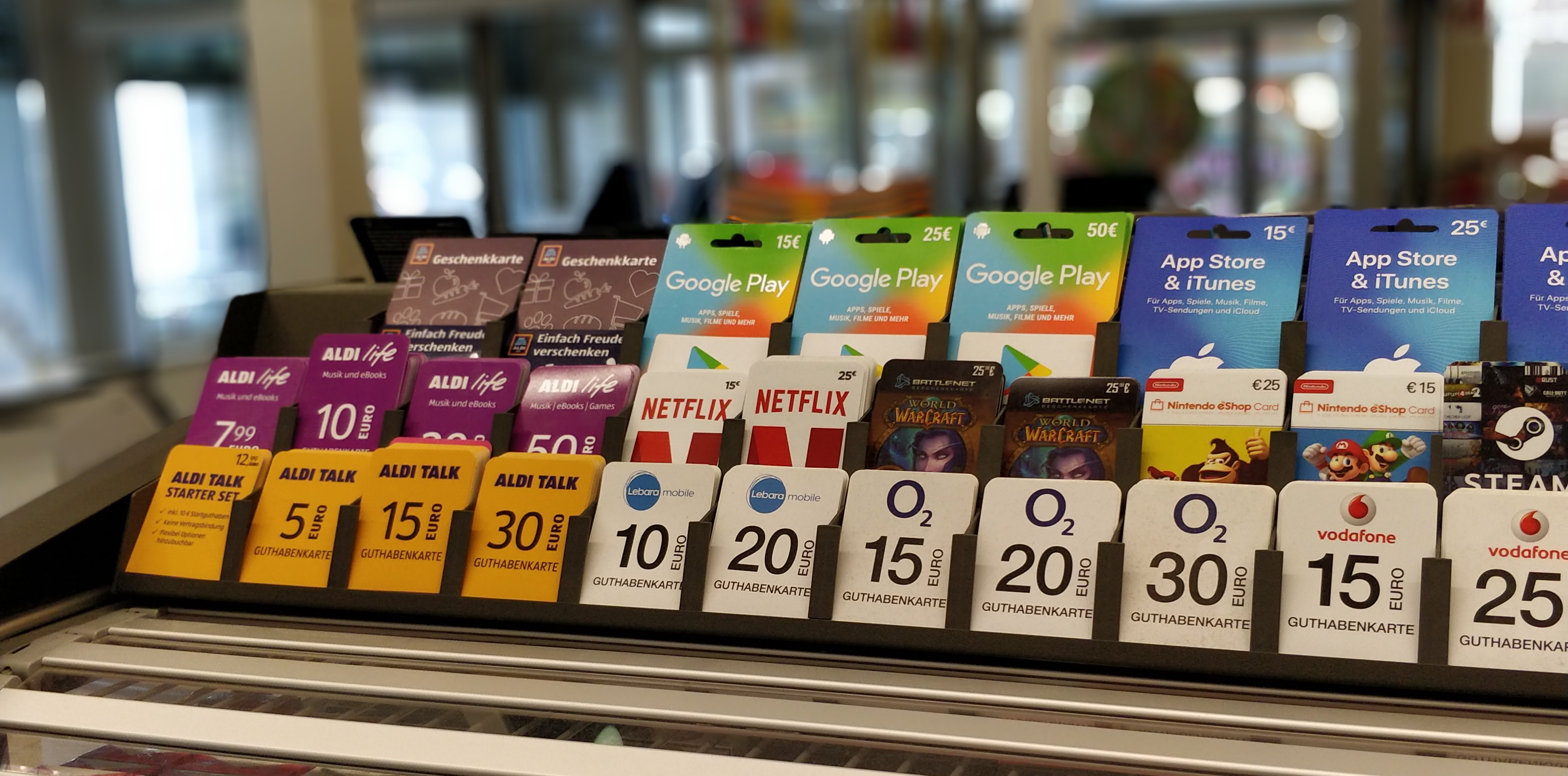
Range of prepaid service cards in a German supermarket

Prepaid refers to goods and services paid for in advance. Examples include postage stamps, attorneys, tolls, public transit cards like the Greater London Oyster card, pay as you go cell phones, and stored-value cards such as gift cards and preloaded credit cards.

Prepaid services and goods are sometimes targeted to marginal customers by retailers.

Unlike postpaid or contract based services, prepaid accounts can be obtained with cash. As a result, they can be established by people who have minimal identification or poor credit ratings. Minors, immigrants, students, defaulters, and those on low incomes are typical prepaid customers.

In accounting terms, a prepayment is treated as an asset by a buyer, and as a liability by a seller.

== Prepaid mobile phones ==
Recent statistics (OECD Communications Outlook 2005) indicate that 40% of the total mobile phone market in the OECD region consists of prepaid accounts. This service was invented by Portuguese provider TMN, while researching for a means to increase penetration of mobile technology by allowing anyone to buy a fully working (usually requiring a quick and simple activation process) mobile phone on any supermarket or electronics store. By removing the complications inherent to the contract system, this allowed the mobile communications user base to grow incredibly fast. In many countries this type of service became the predominant one, shortly after introduction, by providing both consumers and service providers with considerable advantages over the traditional method. In some countries, such as Italy or Mexico, market share of prepaid can be as high as 90%. In other countries, such as Finland or South Korea, the figure drops to about 2%.

A Prepaid Call (or even Calling Card) is actually established through two calls. The first is either through an 800 Toll Free Number, or some come from the big telephone companies that have available international toll free numbers, or many offer calling through a local phone number, usually printed on the back that offer cheaper rates, but the first call costs are passed on to the consumer.

The user places this first call to get to the providers platform, and once connected, the caller is authenticated via a PIN or as seen in Europe or around other parts of the world the card may have an electronic chip on it, similar to how it is seen on the American Express Blue card. If the local number provided is used from the consumers home or cell phone, the user pays for the cost of the first call. The caller can see this on bills even if the call is not connected. The reason that 800 toll free is more expensive is because the Prepaid Calling Card Company pays for the attempts and even when calling to check a balance, the user only pays when they are actually connected. Many Local Telephone Companies don't show local usage, so the consumer may not see that they are paying for a local call every time an attempt is made. This is not true when calling a toll free number from a land line, but with cell phones, air time is used. With most local phone companies, call detail can be retrieved to support this.

Once authenticated, the consumer is usually presented with a balance then prompted for a destination number (the second call), and usually given the time left on the card based on the number just dialled. Then the user is connected.

With smaller companies beware the hidden charges when the rates are too low to be true. They may have hidden fees or poorly advertised fees, like 3 minute rounding, connection fees, monthly, weekly, daily, or even maintenance fees. Look around when you buy these smaller name brands to make sure you know what you are buying.

The pseudonymity enabled by prepaid services has recently become a concern with law enforcement agencies that consider it a safe haven for criminals and terrorists. As a result, a number of countries including Australia, Germany, Indonesia, Japan, Malaysia, Mozambique, Norway, Singapore, South Africa, Switzerland, and Thailand have passed laws to require that all prepaid customers register their personal information with their mobile carrier.

In some countries, the law requires that customers notify their mobile carrier when transferring ownership of a prepaid phone or SIM card.

In Australia, the prepaid registration policy is part of a larger law enforcement initiative that includes the creation and maintenance of an Integrated Public Number Database.

== Energy ==
In 1999, Texas deregulated the energy industry by allowing third-party affiliates to offer electricity services. As a result, a handful of Texas companies are offering the ability to prepay your electricity, with the balance going toward the posted kilowatt hours rate. This system is now common in China and Indonesia, as a way to forestall non-payment of bills.

== Insurance ==
Insurance premiums are usually paid at or before the start of the insurance period, the period of cover, but the premium may at times be payable in instalments during the insurance period.

== See also ==
- Advance-deposit wagering
- Comm South Companies
