= Ada Terminal Railway =

Overview
- Locale: Oklahoma
- Dates of operation: 1909–1914

Technical
- Track gauge: 4 ft 8 1/2 in (1,435 mm)
- Length: 1.93 mi (3.11 km)

The Ada Terminal Railway, an affiliate of the Oklahoma Central Railway, constructed a spur off the Oklahoma Central into Ada, Oklahoma, in 1909, with about 1.93 miles of track. Its assets were assigned July 31, 1914 to become part of the Oklahoma Central Railroad.

== History ==
Construction of the Oklahoma Central Railway in the 1906–1908 timeframe bypassed the town of Ada by a small amount to the south, since Ada refused to provide any financial bonus to the builders. However, after the line fell into receivership on June 2, 1908, the trustees decided that linking the railroad to Ada would be good for business, since Ada was prospering without regard to the Oklahoma Central. Meanwhile, local Ada businessmen had decided providing some financing for a link would be prudent. The trustees incorporated the Ada Terminal Railway Company on August 11, 1909, to handle the spur. In that year, Ada Terminal Railway built track into Ada, 1.93 miles in length, from the Oklahoma Central main line. The Ada Terminal Railway had no trains of its own, but simply furnished the rails over which the Oklahoma Central trains came into Ada.

The Ada Terminal Railway assets were included, along with the assets of the Chickasha Terminal Railway Company and the Oklahoma Central Railway Company itself, in a reorganized company called the Oklahoma Central Railroad, which was created as of July 31, 1914. That entity was controlled by the Atchison, Topeka and Santa Fe Railway (Santa Fe), through ownership of a majority of its capital stock, from August 1, 1914. The tracks of the new Oklahoma Central were also leased to and operated by the Santa Fe.

A depot building was constructed in Ada by the Santa Fe in 1914, which still stands. However, virtually all the Oklahoma Central trackage has since been abandoned.
