= Gaar Corner, Oklahoma =

Gaar Corner
- Unincorporated community
- Location within the state of Oklahoma Gaar Corner (the United States)
- Coordinates: 34°47′48″N 96°51′43″W
- Country: United States
- State: Oklahoma
- County: Pontotoc
- Elevation: 1,011 ft (308 m)
- Time zone: UTC-6 (Central (CST))
  - Summer (DST): UTC-5 (CDT)
- GNIS feature ID: 1100438

Gaar Corner is an Unincorporated community in the U.S. state of Oklahoma. Gaar Corner is located in western Pontotoc County on State Highway 19, east of Stratford. While Gaar Corner is not shown on the official state map, it is marked by official ODOT place-name signs along SH-19.
