= Vanoss, Oklahoma =

Vanoss
- Unincorporated community and Census designated place
- Location within the state of Oklahoma Vanoss (the United States)
- Coordinates: 34°45′27″N 96°52′39″W
- Country: United States
- State: Oklahoma
- County: Pontotoc

Area
  - Total: 1.21 sq mi (3.14 km^{2})
  - Land: 1.21 sq mi (3.14 km^{2})
  - Water: 0 sq mi (0.00 km^{2})
- Elevation: 1,034 ft (315 m)

Population (2020)
  - Total: 146
  - Density: 120.4/sq mi (46.49/km^{2})
- Time zone: UTC-6 (Central (CST))
  - Summer (DST): UTC-5 (CDT)
- FIPS code: 40-76850
- GNIS feature ID: 2805359

Vanoss is an unincorporated community in Pontotoc County, Oklahoma, United States. As of the 2020 census, Vanoss had a population of 146. The community is located 10 miles west of Ada. The town was originally named Midland and was located a few miles away from its present location. When the Oklahoma Central Railroad was built, the townspeople moved the town so it would be next to the railroad, and they changed its name to Vanoss in honor of Salomon Frederik van Oss (S.F. Vanoss), who was a Dutch director and financier of the Oklahoma Central Railroad. Though little remains of the community, Vanoss Public Schools, including an elementary school, a middle school, and Vanoss High School, continue to serve the surrounding area.

== Demographics ==
Historical population
Census	Pop.	Note	%±
2020	146		—
U.S. Decennial Census

=== 2020 census ===
As of the 2020 census, Vanoss had a population of 146. The median age was 43.5 years. 29.5% of residents were under the age of 18 and 19.9% of residents were 65 years of age or older. For every 100 females there were 105.6 males, and for every 100 females age 18 and over there were 90.7 males age 18 and over.

0.0% of residents lived in urban areas, while 100.0% lived in rural areas.

There were 52 households in Vanoss, of which 46.2% had children under the age of 18 living in them. Of all households, 80.8% were married-couple households, 3.8% were households with a male householder and no spouse or partner present, and 7.7% were households with a female householder and no spouse or partner present. About 3.8% of all households were made up of individuals and 0.0% had someone living alone who was 65 years of age or older.

There were 55 housing units, of which 5.5% were vacant. The homeowner vacancy rate was 4.9% and the rental vacancy rate was 0.0%.

Racial composition as of the 2020 census
Race	Number	Percent
White	92	63.0%
Black or African American	0	0.0%
American Indian and Alaska Native	32	21.9%
Asian	0	0.0%
Native Hawaiian and Other Pacific Islander	0	0.0%
Some other race	2	1.4%
Two or more races	20	13.7%
Hispanic or Latino (of any race)	4	2.7%

== Education ==
It is within the Vanoss Public Schools school district.
