= Chimney Hill =

Chimney Hill may refer to:

- Chimney Hill, Vermont, a census-designated place
- Chimney Hill, a neighborhood in Northeast Dallas, Texas
- Chimney Hill, a landmark in Pontotoc County, Oklahoma
- Chimney Hill Elementary School, located in Newton, Surrey, British Columbia
