= Albert S. Ross =

American architect

Albert S. Ross (January 9, 1897 – April 1987) was an American architect, based in Ada, Oklahoma. Several of his works are listed on the National Register of Historic Places.

He was a member of the American Institute of Architects from 1944 on, and a Fellow from 1957 on.

From the Sugg Clinic NRHP form: "Dr. Sugg retained architect Albert S. Ross, one of the most prominent of his profession in that part of Oklahoma. Over the course of his career Ross designed ninety-two public, commercial, educational, and private buildings in Ada. Eighteen of Ross's buildings stand on the campus of East Central State University (NR 86003470, East Central Normal School). In total, Ross designed 532 buildings in southeastern Oklahoma. In 1957 he was distinguished as the third Oklahoman to become a Fellow of the American Institute of Architects. Ross's finest achievement is considered to be the Classical Revival-style 1938 Ada Public Library."

Works include:

- Ada Public Library, 400 S. Rennie Ada, OK Ross, Albert S., NRHP-listed
- East Central State Normal School, multiple buildings, NRHP-listed
- Robert E. Lee School (Durant, Oklahoma), Ninth and Louisiana Sts. Durant, OK Ross, Albert S., NRHP-listed
- F.W. Meaders House, 521 South Broadway Ada, OK Ross, Albert, NRHP-listed
- Sugg Clinic, 100 E. 13th St. Ada, OK Ross, Albert S., NRHP-listed
