= McSwain Theatre =

Coordinates: 34°46′37.11″N 96°40′48.19″W

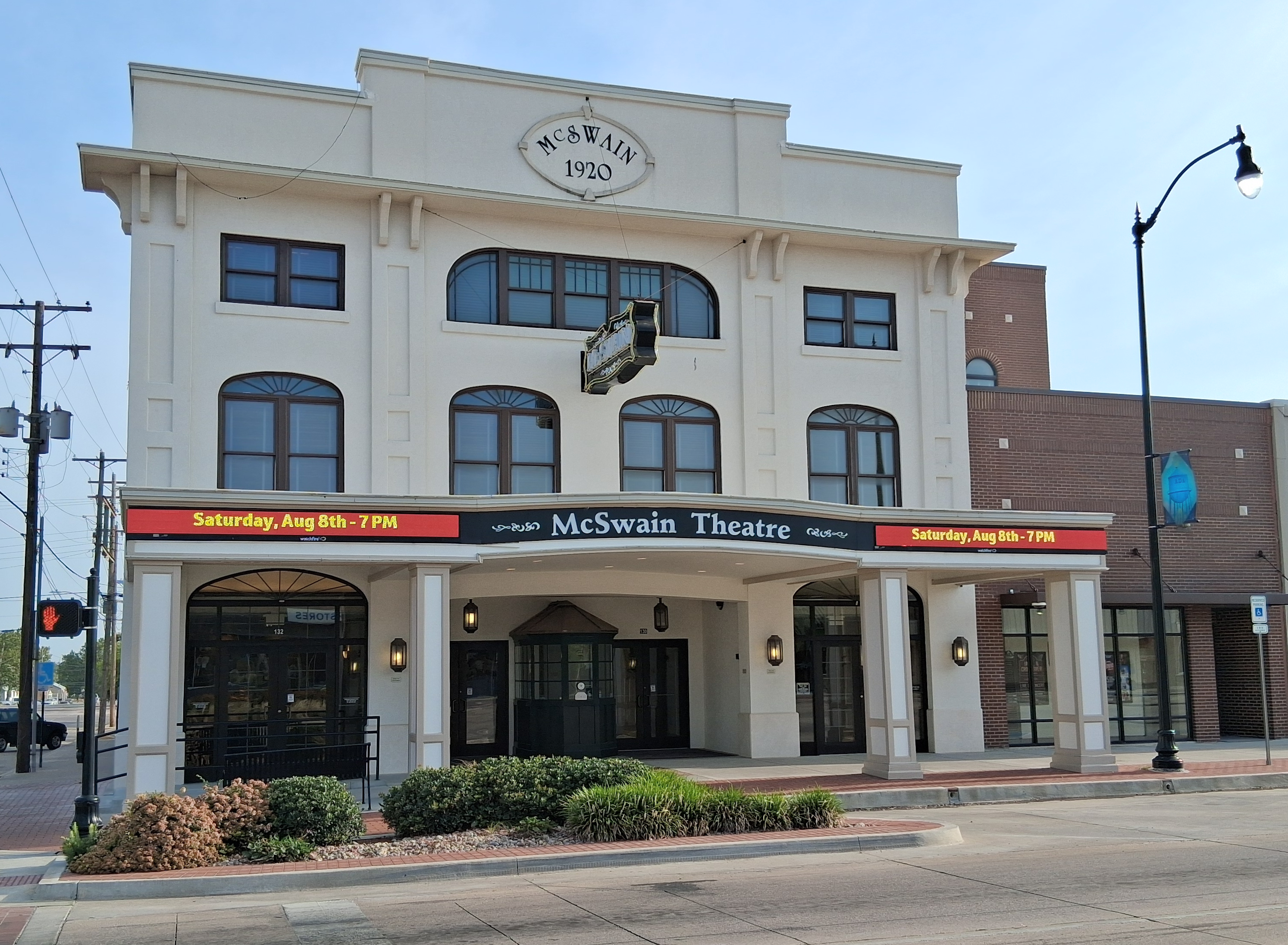
- McSwain Theatre in 2026
- Interactive map of McSwain Theatre
- Address: 130 W. Main Street; Ada, Pontotoc County, Oklahoma
- Owner: Chickasaw Nation
- Capacity: 574
- Current use: Theater, music venue, art gallery

Construction
- Opened: 1920
- Reopened: 2009
- Years active: 1920–1988, 1991–2003, 2009–present
- Architect: Mission Revival Style

Website
- http://www.McSwainTheatre.com

The McSwain Theatre is a 560-seat former cinema, and present-day theater and music venue, located in Ada, Pontotoc County, Oklahoma.

The theatre was founded in 1920 by Foster McSwain, as a venue for silent films and vaudeville performances, and after 1935, for talkies and local movie premieres.

== History ==
=== 20th century ===
The McSwain Theatre is housed in a three-story, Spanish Colonial Mission Revival Style building, that opened on March 30, 1920. The first silent film screened in the McSwain was Suds, starring Mary Pickford, on July 19, 1920.

In 1935, the theatre underwent its first renovations. New equipment to accommodate the evolution of movies with sound was installed, along with air conditioning, a balcony, and new seating. Roy Rogers and Dale Evans appeared at the theatre on October 30, 1946 for the world premiere of their film Home in Oklahoma. In 1949, Robert Preston and Susan Hayward attended the world premiere of Tulsa at the McSwain.

Due to competition and economic difficulties, the McSwain Theatre was closed in 1988. In 1991, Paul Alford purchased the property in order to transform it into a musical venue hall, holding its first performance on October 17, 1992. Under Alford's ownership, the theatre showcased performances by local musical acts, and stars from Nashville, Tennessee, and Branson, Missouri.

=== 21st century ===
In 2002, upon the death of Alford, the theatre was acquired by the Chickasaw Nation and underwent five years of renovations. An art gallery was added in 2009. The McSwain Theatre held a ribbon cutting with Chickasaw Nation Governor Bill Anoatubby on July 17, 2009, and its grand re-opening on the evening of July 25, 2009. It featured a concert by country artists Jeff Bates, Mark Wills, and Trent Willmon.
