= Happyland, Oklahoma =

Happyland
- Unincorporated community
- Location within the state of Oklahoma Happyland (the United States)
- Coordinates: 34°47′48″N 96°32′58″W
- Country: United States
- State: Oklahoma
- County: Pontotoc
- Elevation: 899 ft (274 m)
- Time zone: UTC-6 (Central (CST))
  - Summer (DST): UTC-5 (CDT)
- GNIS feature ID: 1100475

Happyland is an unincorporated community in Pontotoc County, Oklahoma, United States. It is about 8 miles east of Ada on Oklahoma State Highway 1.

Happyland has frequently been noted on lists of unusual place names. Sign theft of the Happyland sign has been reported.
