= Chimney Hill (Oklahoma) =

Hill in Oklahoma, United States

- Location within Oklahoma

Highest point
- Elevation: 1,346 ft (410 m)
- Coordinates: 34°40′54″N 96°45′25″W

Geography
- Country: United States
- State: Oklahoma
- District: Pontotoc County – just outside the town limits of Fitzhugh

Chimney Hill [alt. 1,346 feet (410 m)] in Pontotoc County, Oklahoma, was a landmark on the old California Road, first recorded by Randolph B. Marcy in 1849. It was identified on old maps as Natural Mound. Its prominence made it a major reference point for many surveys, and in 1920 it became the site of the United States Coast and Geodetic Survey Mound Triangulation Station.

From about 1802 to the 1840s, local native hunters piled cairns on top of the mound, all of which had disappeared by the 20th century. On July 8, 1960, the Oklahoma Historical Society erected a marker declaring the location an important landmark.

The earliest description of the hill, reported by Frederick Tracy Dent, reads:

Still on a firm prairie, I descended in a finely watered valley, thence up a prairie ridge, at the extreme summit of which is one of two mounds, upon both of which the Indians have piled stones serving as landmarks, as they are seen from a long distance on the plains beyond the Washita.

== Gallery ==
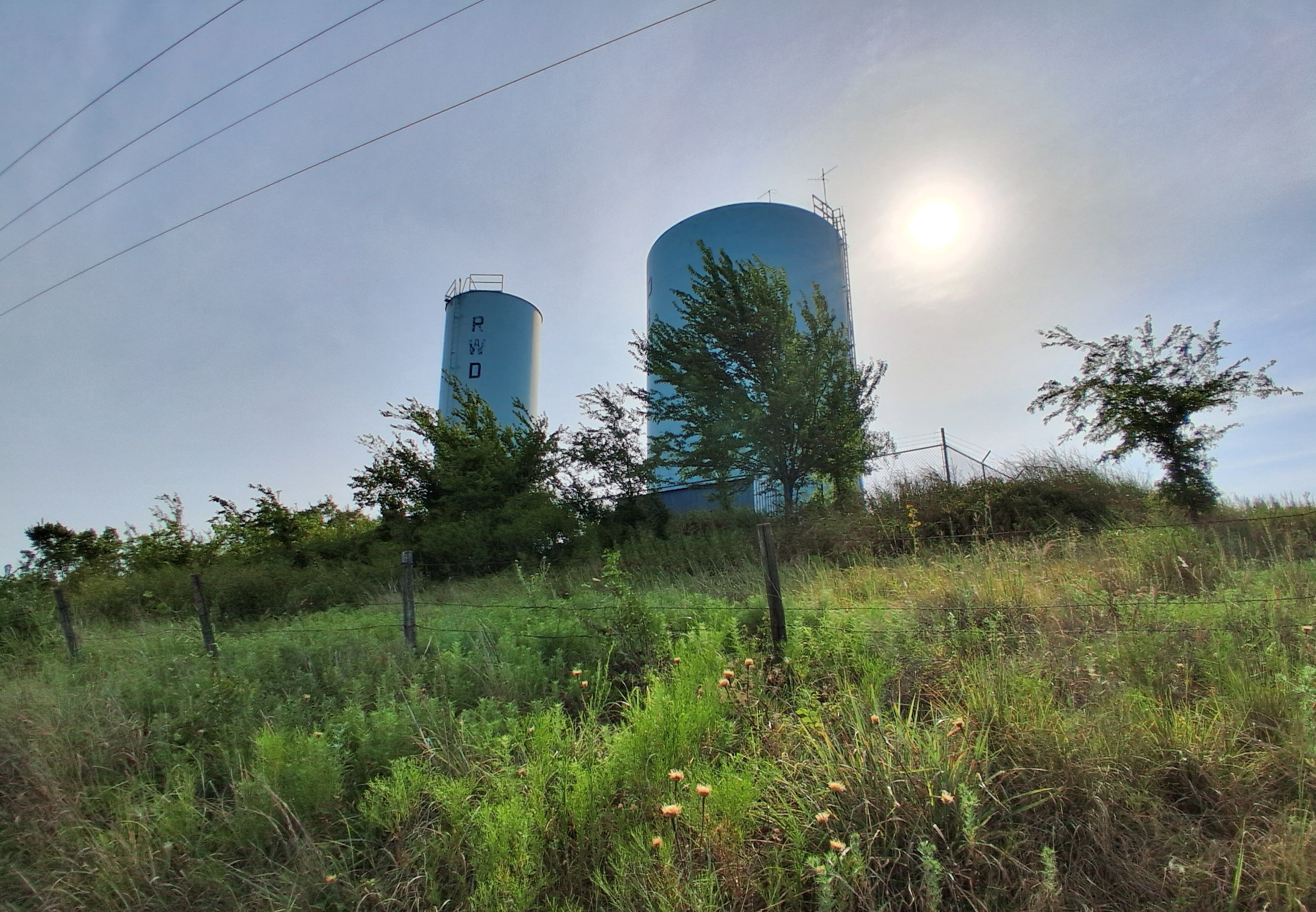
Triangulation station

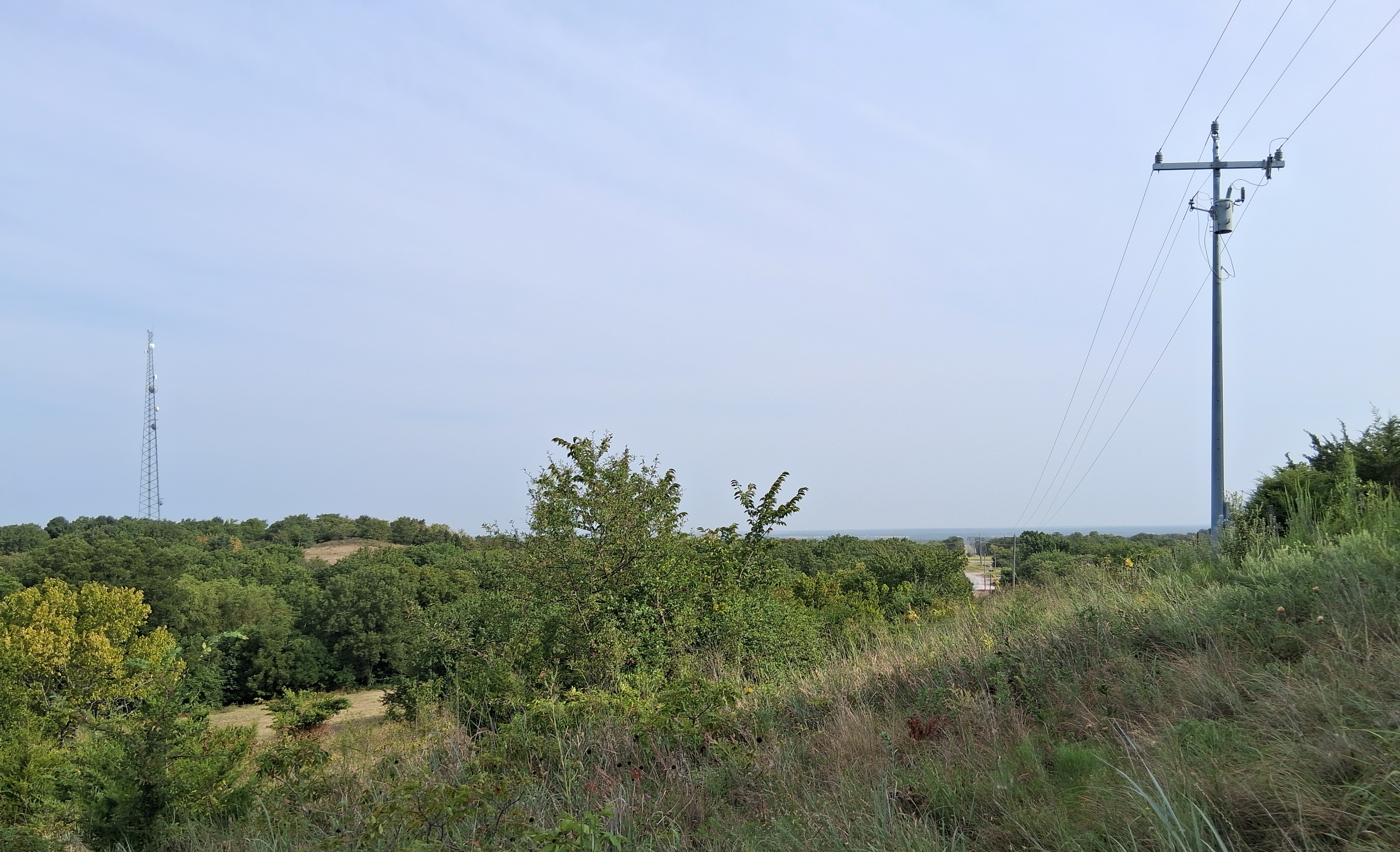
View from the top of Chimney Hill
