= Jeff Bell (executive) =

American chief executive (born 1962)

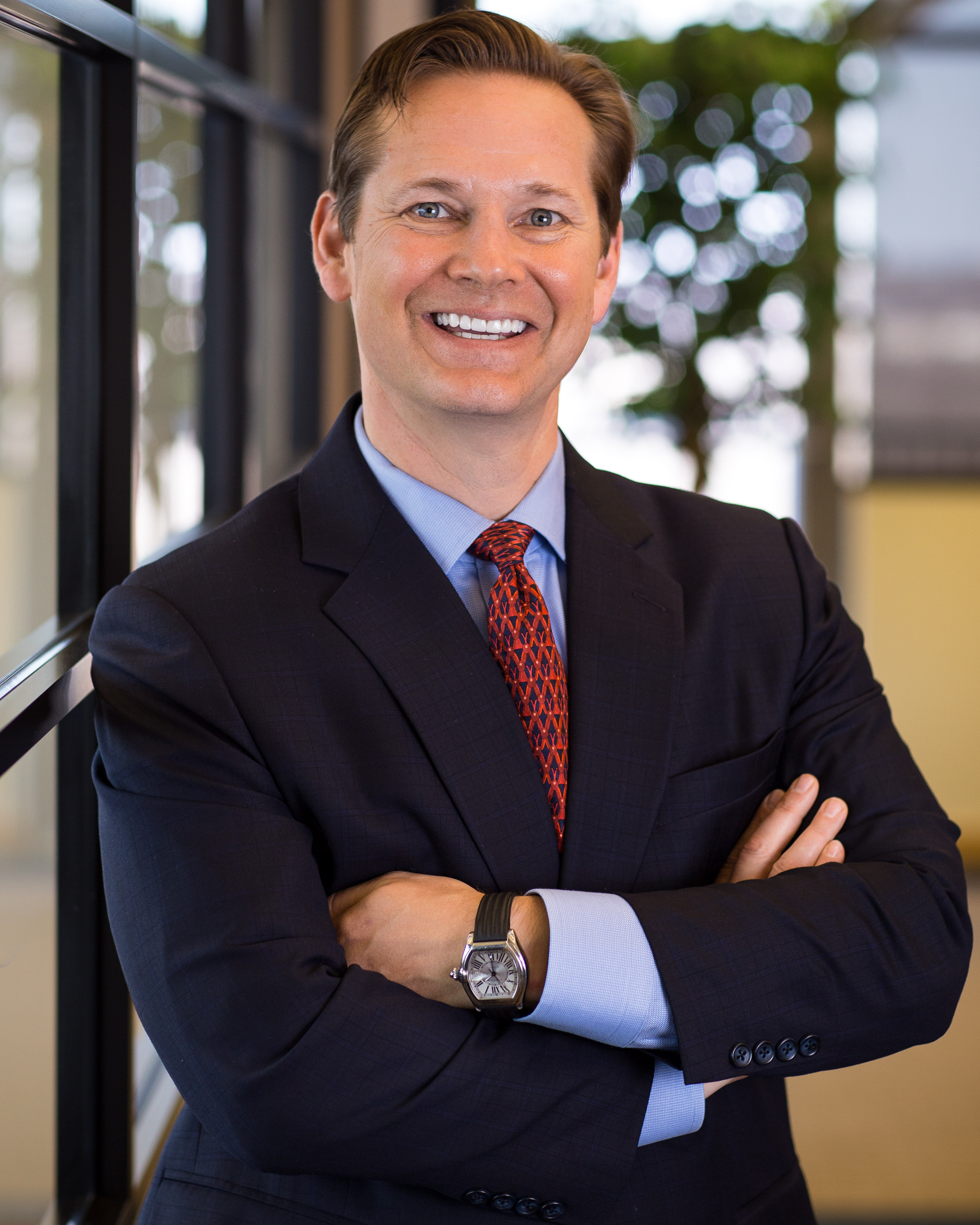
- Bell in 2015
- Born: February 18, 1962 (age 64); Oklahoma City, Oklahoma, U.S.
- Education: Kenyon College; Wharton School of the University of Pennsylvania; Johns Hopkins University
- Board member of: DOMedia; Kenyon College; National Multiple Sclerosis Society; Wharton Future of Advertising Program

Jeff Bell (born February 18, 1962) is an American executive. He is president of Pittsburgh Tomorrow, a non-profit focused upon growing Western Pennsylvania's economy and population. Previously, he was CEO of PPLSI, and is best known for creating the Jeep Rubicon and 4-door Wrangler, launching the Chrysler 300, Halo 3, Gears of War, growing Xbox Live with Netflix and Rock Band, and exiting multiple start-ups. He is an operating partner at MidOcean Private Equity, and a venture partner of NCT Ventures LLC.

Bell worked at Ford Motor Company from 1991 to 2001, Chrysler from 2001 to 2006, and Microsoft from 2006 to 2008, and has also worked for NBCUniversal. He is on the board of advisors of Johns Hopkins-SAIS, the Kenyon Fund and development committee of the Archdiocese of Seattle. He has been on the boards of Kenyon College and the National Multiple Sclerosis Society.

== Early life and education ==
Jeff Bell was born and raised in Oklahoma City. He attended college in Ohio, graduating from Kenyon College in 1984. Bell earned his Master's degree in international relations and economics from the Paul H. Nitze School of Advanced International Studies at Johns Hopkins University in 1988, and his MBA in finance and marketing from the Wharton School of the University of Pennsylvania in 1989.

== Career ==
Bell's professional background is in consumer marketing and sales for global brands and companies, including the Ford Motor Company, Chrysler, Microsoft, and NBCUniversal. He joined Ford's new business development team in 1989 after graduating from Wharton. He held several positions during his tenure at Ford, including product and marketing manager of large cars from 1994 to 1996, general manager of fleet rental and leasing at Ford of Europe in 1997, and managing director of Ford Spain in 1999.

Bell left Ford in 2001 to join Chrysler, where he also held several executive positions. In his role as vice president of marketing communications, he oversaw advertising for the Chrysler, Dodge, and Jeep brands. Bell later served as vice president of the Chrysler and Jeep divisions, and has been credited with launching the Chrysler 300, select Jeep Wrangler and Chrysler Town & Country models, and the "grab life by the horns" marketing campaign. Bell led a product placement initiative to promote Chrysler vehicles in television programming and other media In 2005, Advertising Age named Bell and Chrysler "Interactive Marketer of the Year" and "Online Marketer of the Year", respectively. In February 2006, Bell became vice president of product strategy at Chrysler. While in that role he led a strategy to develop online games for the company.

Bell joined Microsoft in mid 2006 as corporate vice president of global marketing within the company's interactive entertainment business. He is credited with leading marketing campaigns for Gears of War and Halo 3. In 2007, Bell was named Advertising Age's "Entertainment Marketer of the Year" and included in its "Marketing 50" list in 2008. In addition to business achievements, Bell gained notoriety in the gaming community in 2007 when he responded to a NeoGAF user in a message board. Bell's identity was disclosed by NeoGAF administrator, Tyler Malka, who responded to the situation with an apology and later said "after that, I definitely saw a shift." Bell left Microsoft in mid 2008.

In 2012, Bell led NBCUniversal's marketing efforts in the health and fitness field, developing the biggestloser.com and season 14 "The Biggest Lower: Challenge America" campaign. As of 2014, he was serving as a director of NCT Ventures.

On July 1, 2014, Bell was appointed CEO of LegalShield, a legal service product company, replacing Rip Mason, who began serving as executive chairman of the company's board. On May 20, 2022, LegalShield's parent company PPLSI announced that Bell had retired as CEO.

As of 2026, Bell serves on the Executive Board of MidOcean Partners, and in April, 2025, was named the President of a non-profit Pittsburgh Tomorrow which seeks to promote the city's virtues, increase population and economic growth, and provide applications, such as the website LifeInPittsburgh.com.

=== Business Transformation and Innovation ===
Bell is known for leading growth and transformation initiatives across the automotive, technology, subscription services, and private equity sectors. During his career he has been associated with the launch of the Chrysler 300, Jeep Wrangler 4-door, Jeep Trail-Rated Halo 3, Gears of War, Xbox Live growth initiatives, and the transformation of LegalShield. Bell is also considered to be a pioneer in the area of "branded entertainment"—where Dodge, Chrysler and Jeep products were prominently placed in movies that in turn created unique television ads for those vehicles.

=== Board service ===
Bell joined the board of Music Reports in October, 2025. In May, 2009, he was named chairman of the Columbus, Ohio-based out-of-home advertising company DOmedia Columbus, a position he continues to hold, as of 2025. He serves on the Kenyon Fund Executive Committee, also served on Kenyon College's board of trustees in 2009. Bell has served on the National Multiple Sclerosis Society's board of directors, and also served on the global advisory board of the Wharton Future of Advertising Program, which is affiliated with his alma mater, the Wharton School of the University of Pennsylvania. Bell is a member of Johns Hopkins University's School of Advanced International Studies Advisory Board. He is also a member of the Board of Directors of Cancer Lifeline.

== See also ==
- List of people from Oklahoma City
