= LegalShield =

American multi-level marketing company

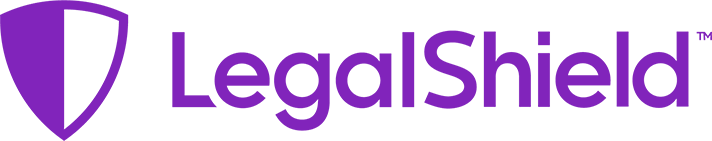
- Formerly: Sportsman's Motor Club (1972–1976); Pre-Paid Legal Services, Inc. (1976–2011)
- Type: Private
- Industry: Legal services
- Founded: 1972; 54 years ago
- Founder: Harland Stonecipher
- Headquarters: Ada, Oklahoma, U.S.
- Areas served: United States; Canada
- Key people: Warren Schlichting (CEO); Ogemdi Ike (COO); Anthony Conte (CFO)
- Products: Pre-paid legal services; Identity theft protection
- Services: Legal services; Identity theft monitoring and restoration
- Website: legalshield.com

LegalShield (formerly Pre-Paid Legal Services) is an American company that sells subscription-based legal service plans and identity-theft protection in the United States and Canada. Its memberships are sold directly to consumers, as employee benefits and through a multi-level marketing network of independent sales associates.

Under the company's compensation system, associates may receive commissions for selling memberships and for sales made by associates they recruit. LegalShield reported that in 2023 an "active" associate received average annual compensation of $2,647.89 and median compensation of $118.43 before expenses; 31 percent of active associates received no compensation. For the purposes of the disclosure, the company defined active associates as those who either sold at least one LegalShield or IDShield membership or used its Prospect sales application during the year.

The company was founded in 1972 as the Sportsman's Motor Club and was incorporated as Pre-Paid Legal Services in 1976. It became publicly traded in 1984. In 2011, private-equity firm MidOcean Partners acquired the company for approximately $650 million, after which it became privately held and adopted the LegalShield name.

== Services ==
LegalShield sells subscription-based legal service plans for individuals, families and businesses. Members obtain legal services through independent provider law firms rather than lawyers employed directly by LegalShield. The scope of services varies by membership plan, and services outside a plan's coverage may be available from provider lawyers at reduced rates.

The company also markets IDShield, a subscription service providing identity and credit monitoring and assistance with identity-theft restoration.

Memberships are sold directly to consumers, through employee-benefit programs and through independent sales associates participating in the company's multi-level marketing compensation system. According to LegalShield's 2023 income disclosure, associates paid a one-time $99 registration fee. The company also offered an optional $24.95-per-month Advantage Plus subscription, which was required to qualify for certain performance bonuses; associates in some jurisdictions could also incur licensing or registration fees.

== History ==
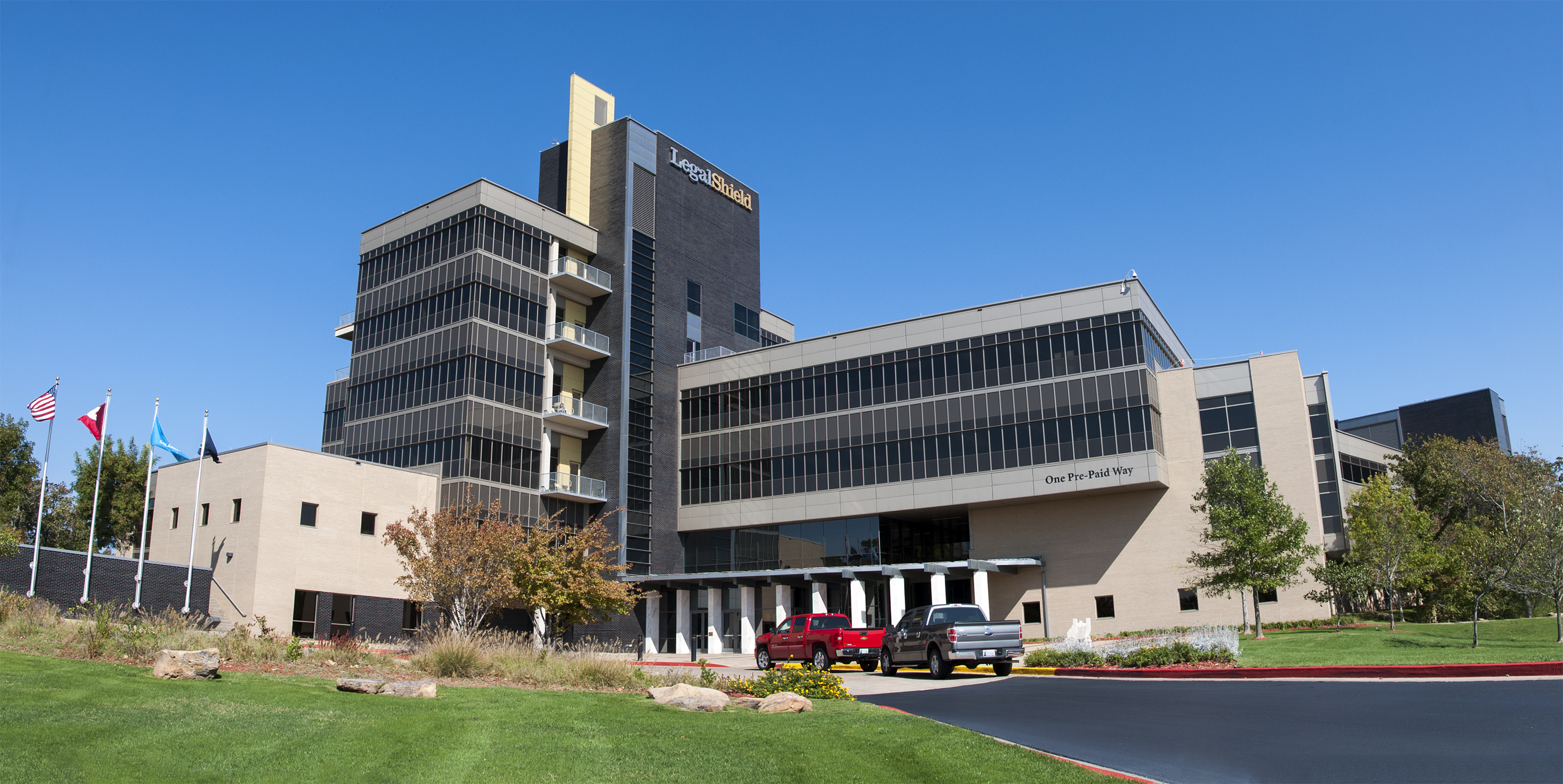
Exterior of the company's headquarters in Ada, Oklahoma (2012)

=== Sportsman's Motor Club ===
The company was founded in Ada, Oklahoma, in 1972 by insurance salesman Harland Stonecipher as the Sportsman's Motor Club. Stonecipher developed the business after incurring legal expenses following a 1969 automobile accident. After researching legal-expense plans offered in Europe, he established the company to reimburse members for legal fees arising from automobile accidents.

=== Pre-Paid Legal Services ===
The club changed its name and incorporated as Pre-Paid Legal Services, Inc. in 1976. The company expanded the concept beyond automobile-related legal expenses to prepaid legal plans for individuals. Initially, members could select their own lawyers and obtain reimbursement from the company; by the 1980s, members seeking covered services were directed to designated provider firms.

Pre-Paid Legal became publicly traded in 1984. It was initially listed on the NASDAQ, moved to the American Stock Exchange in 1986 and later moved to the New York Stock Exchange in 1999, where it traded under the symbol PPD.

In 1998, Pre-Paid Legal acquired The People's Network, a Dallas-based marketing company that operated a satellite television network used in part to provide programming to the company's sales force.

The company began offering plans in Canada in 1999. By 2009, it reported covering 28,000 Canadian families in four provinces.

In 2003, Pre-Paid Legal moved into a new corporate headquarters in Ada. In 2010, Stonecipher stepped down as president and CEO. Randy Harp and Mark Brown became co-CEOs, with Harp also serving as company president, while Stonecipher remained chairman of the board.

==== Regulatory and legal issues ====
In 2000, CBC Television's Marketplace examined Pre-Paid Legal's multi-level marketing operation and criticised its recruitment practices, including the sale of training materials to associates.

In 2001, the Wyoming attorney general challenged income representations used to promote Pre-Paid Legal's multi-level marketing program, saying the representations were prohibited under Wyoming law. Pre-Paid Legal denied violating the law but agreed to change its marketing and pay $7,000, including $2,000 in refunds to participants who alleged that they had been misled.

The company also faced scrutiny over its financial reporting. The U.S. Securities and Exchange Commission required Pre-Paid Legal to stop treating commissions paid to sales associates as assets rather than expenses. The company subsequently restated its financial statements for 2000, reducing reported earnings from $43.6 million to $20.5 million and stockholders' equity from $147 million to $42 million.

Pre-Paid Legal was the subject of a number of lawsuits concerning its sales and business practices during the 2000s. Approximately 250 plaintiffs filed about 30 lawsuits against the company in Alabama beginning in 2004; according to The New York Times, the cases had been dismissed or settled by 2006. The company also faced litigation in Mississippi. In one case, a jury found Pre-Paid Legal and Stonecipher liable for deceptive advertising and fraud, and in November 2005 awarded $9.9 million in punitive damages. Other proceedings had different outcomes; the company successfully overturned a fraud verdict and defeated a class-action lawsuit alleging that it operated a pyramid scheme.

Pre-Paid Legal's independent auditor initially declined to approve the company's 2004 financial statements because of "material weaknesses" involving the processing of commissions. The company filed audited statements two weeks later after receiving approval from Grant Thornton. The New York Times reported in 2006 that proposed Federal Trade Commission rules would have required Pre-Paid Legal to disclose that fewer than 25 percent of its sales representatives sold more than one insurance plan during 2005, a figure the company confirmed in a filing with the SEC.

In 2007, the FTC began investigating Pre-Paid Legal's marketing of its identity-theft service and its Affirmative Defense Response System. The company revised its marketing materials in 2009 after regulators raised concerns over claims made about the program. The FTC ended the investigation in 2010 without taking enforcement action.

=== LegalShield ===
In January 2011, Pre-Paid Legal agreed to be acquired by entities formed by MidOcean Partners for approximately $650 million. The transaction closed on June 30, 2011, returning the company to private ownership. Rip Mason became CEO in 2011, and later that year the company changed its name to LegalShield.

In 2014, Jeff Bell replaced Mason as CEO, while Mason became chairman of the board. Bell retired in 2022.

Stone Point Capital purchased a majority interest in LegalShield from MidOcean Partners in 2018.

LegalShield entered the United Kingdom market through the LegalDefence app, developed with Slater & Gordon UK. The company established offices in Oxford, and the service launched in 2019. The UK venture entered liquidation in May 2021.

Former Dish Network and Sling TV executive Warren Schlichting became CEO in December 2022. Ogemdi Ike became chief operating officer in 2024, and Anthony Conte became chief financial officer in 2026.
