= Chickasha Terminal Railway =

Overview
- Locale: Oklahoma
- Dates of operation: 1910–1914

Technical
- Track gauge: 4 ft 8 1/2 in (1,435 mm)
- Length: 3.44 mi (5.54 km)

The Chickasha Terminal Railway (CTR), an affiliate of the Oklahoma Central Railway, constructed track off the Oklahoma Central into Chickasha, Oklahoma, in 1910, with about 3.44 miles of rails. Its assets were assigned July 31, 1914 to become part of the Oklahoma Central Railroad.

== History ==
Construction of the Oklahoma Central Railway in the 1906–1908 timeframe included construction from Lehigh to near Chickasha. However, the line fell into receivership on June 2, 1908. The trustees decided to build additional trackage in and near Chickasha, and incorporated the Chickasha Terminal Railway Company in Oklahoma on November 24, 1909, to provide a separate financing vehicle. The CTR constructed 3.44 miles of single track from the Oklahoma Central mainline to Chickasha, completing it December 15, 1910. The CTR had no equipment; it was instead leased to the Oklahoma Central at no cost, but with 50% of any profits going to pay off the CTR's funded debt.

The CTR's assets were included, along with the assets of the similar Ada Terminal Railway and the Oklahoma Central Railway itself, in a reorganized company called the Oklahoma Central Railroad, which was created as of July 31, 1914. That entity was controlled by the Atchison, Topeka and Santa Fe Railway (Santa Fe), through ownership of a majority of its capital stock, from August 1, 1914. The tracks of the new Oklahoma Central were also leased to and operated by the Santa Fe.

Abandonment of the former CTR trackage was authorized February 9, 1942. Virtually all the Oklahoma Central trackage has since been abandoned.
