= Latta, Oklahoma =

- Unincorporated community
- Location within Oklahoma Location within the United States
- Coordinates: 34°44′49″N 96°42′25″W
- Country: United States
- State: Oklahoma
- County: Pontotoc

Area
  - Total: 2.52 sq mi (6.52 km^{2})
  - Land: 2.52 sq mi (6.52 km^{2})
  - Water: 0 sq mi (0.00 km^{2})
- Elevation: 978 ft (298 m)

Population (2020)
  - Total: 1,465
  - Density: 581.6/sq mi (224.55/km^{2})
- Time zone: UTC-6 (Central (CST))
  - Summer (DST): UTC-5 (CDT)
- Area code: 580
- GNIS feature ID: 2629926

Latta is an unincorporated community and census-designated place in Pontotoc County, Oklahoma, United States. As of the 2020 census, Latta had a population of 1,465. Oklahoma State Highway 1 passes through the community.

== Geography ==
According to the U.S. Census Bureau, the community has an area of 2.520 square miles (6.53 km^{2}), all land.

== Demographics ==
Historical population
Census	Pop.	Note	%±
2020	1,465		—
U.S. Decennial Census

=== 2020 census ===
As of the 2020 census, Latta had a population of 1,465. The median age was 32.4 years. 32.9% of residents were under the age of 18 and 14.8% of residents were 65 years of age or older. For every 100 females there were 88.3 males, and for every 100 females age 18 and over there were 82.0 males age 18 and over.

89.5% of residents lived in urban areas, while 10.5% lived in rural areas.

There were 557 households in Latta, of which 36.8% had children under the age of 18 living in them. Of all households, 43.4% were married-couple households, 15.6% were households with a male householder and no spouse or partner present, and 36.4% were households with a female householder and no spouse or partner present. About 33.9% of all households were made up of individuals and 12.6% had someone living alone who was 65 years of age or older.

There were 624 housing units, of which 10.7% were vacant. The homeowner vacancy rate was 4.3% and the rental vacancy rate was 13.1%.

Racial composition as of the 2020 census
Race	Number	Percent
White	727	49.6%
Black or African American	21	1.4%
American Indian and Alaska Native	437	29.8%
Asian	15	1.0%
Native Hawaiian and Other Pacific Islander	1	0.1%
Some other race	30	2.0%
Two or more races	234	16.0%
Hispanic or Latino (of any race)	96	6.6%

== Education ==
It is within the Latta Public Schools school district. Latta High School is the comprehensive high school.
