= Middleberg, Oklahoma =

- Unincorporated community
- Location within Oklahoma Location within the United States
- Coordinates: 35°06′24″N 97°44′03″W
- Country: United States
- State: Oklahoma
- County: Grady
- Elevation: 1,306 ft (398 m)
- Time zone: UTC-6 (Central (CST))
  - Summer (DST): UTC-5 (CDT)
- GNIS feature ID: 2805340

Middleberg (sometimes spelled "Middleburg") is an unincorporated community in Grady County, Oklahoma, United States, located on the old alignment of US Highway 62 between Blanchard and Chickasha.

As of the 2020 census, Middleberg had a population of 99.

Middleberg was originally a stop on the Oklahoma Central Railroad (aka "the OCR") but today is a rural community.

According to locals, there are two possible explanations for the community's name, either that it got its name because is in the middle of the route between Chickasha and Blanchard, or alternatively that it was named for Gerritt Middleberg, a representative of the Dutch investors of the OCR.

Other community institutions include the Middleberg Baptist Church.

== Demographics ==
=== 2020 census ===
As of the 2020 census, Middleberg had a population of 99. The median age was 37.5 years. 31.3% of residents were under the age of 18 and 16.2% of residents were 65 years of age or older. For every 100 females there were 102.0 males, and for every 100 females age 18 and over there were 119.4 males age 18 and over.

0.0% of residents lived in urban areas, while 100.0% lived in rural areas.

There were 38 households in Middleberg, of which 47.4% had children under the age of 18 living in them. Of all households, 68.4% were married-couple households, 7.9% were households with a male householder and no spouse or partner present, and 15.8% were households with a female householder and no spouse or partner present. About 18.5% of all households were made up of individuals and 7.9% had someone living alone who was 65 years of age or older.

There were 38 housing units, of which 0.0% were vacant. The homeowner vacancy rate was 0.0% and the rental vacancy rate was 0.0%.

Racial composition as of the 2020 census
| Race | Number | Percent |
|---|---|---|
| White | 77 | 77.8% |
| Black or African American | 4 | 4.0% |
| American Indian and Alaska Native | 5 | 5.1% |
| Asian | 0 | 0.0% |
| Native Hawaiian and Other Pacific Islander | 0 | 0.0% |
| Some other race | 2 | 2.0% |
| Two or more races | 11 | 11.1% |
| Hispanic or Latino (of any race) | 10 | 10.1% |

== Education ==
It is in the Middleberg Public School school district, an elementary school district.

Public school students in Middleberg attend Middleberg Schools through the eighth grade, after which they attend high school in nearby Blanchard.
