= Latta High School (Oklahoma) =

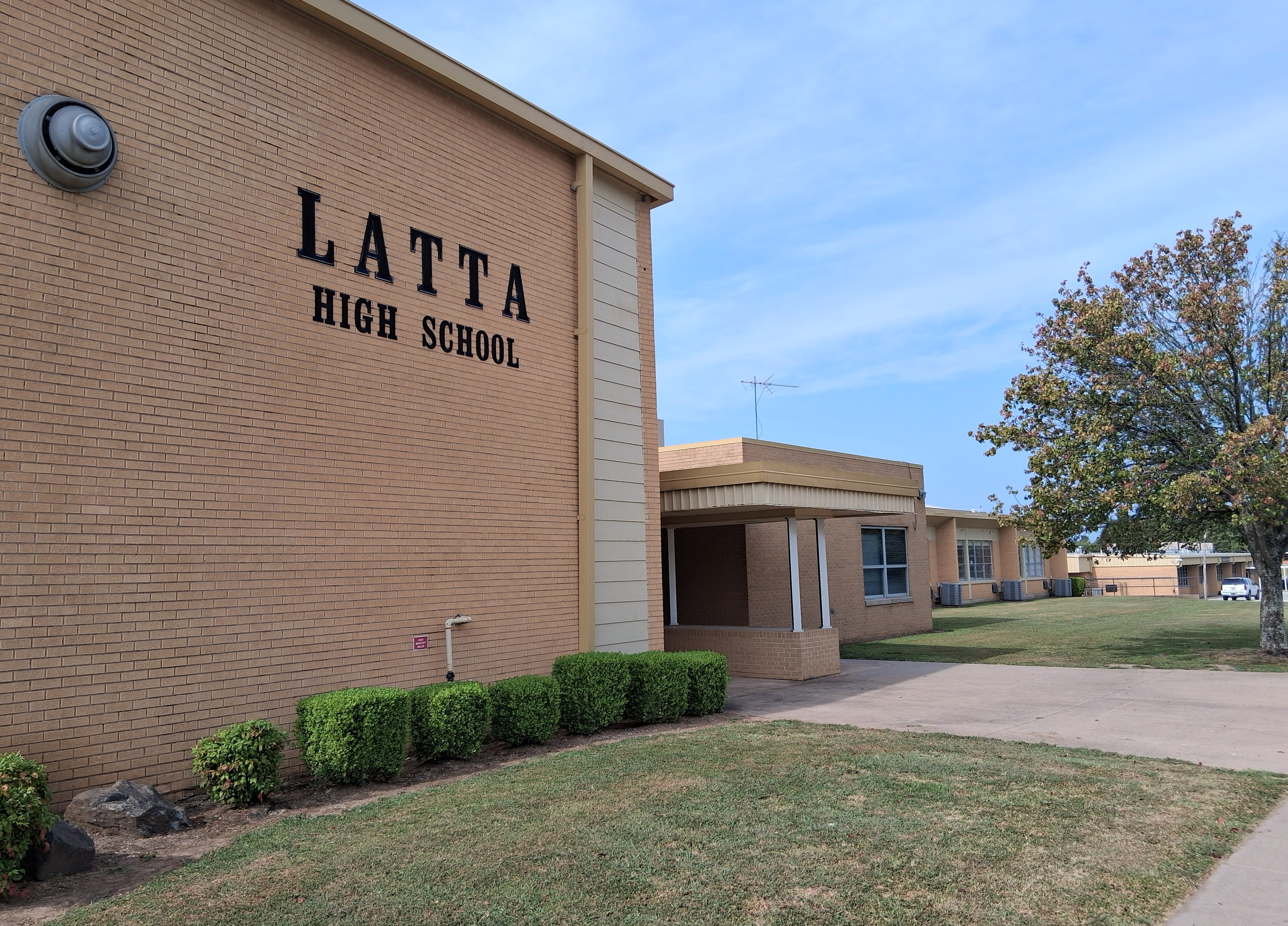
- Latta High School in 2026

Location
- 13925 County Road 1560; Ada, Oklahoma 74820; 34.7524°N 96.7058°W

Information
- Type: Public High School
- Teaching staff: 13.57 (FTE)
- Grades: 9–12
- Enrollment: 230 (2023–2024)
- Student to teacher ratio: 16.95
- Campus type: Rural
- Color
- Mascot: Panther
- Rival: Ada High School
- Website: www.latta.k12.ok.us

Latta High School is a high school located in Latta, Oklahoma, with an Ada postal address. It is the only high school in the Latta School District, which includes Latta and portions of Ada.

39% of the student body is economically disadvantaged. Latta High placed in the top 5% of Oklahoma high schools for overall test scores. In 2016, the Oklahoma State Department of Education rated Latta High School as a High-Performing School.

== Demographics ==
White	African American	Asian American	Latino	Native American	Two or More Races
63%	0.4%	1.4%	5%	30%	3%
