= Oklahoma Central Railroad (1914–1942) =

Overview
- Dates of operation: 1914–1942
- Predecessor: Oklahoma Central Railway
- Successor: Atchison, Topeka and Santa Fe

The Oklahoma Central Railroad, (OCR) earlier the Oklahoma Central Railway, was a railroad operating in the U.S. state of Oklahoma from 1907 to 1917. It was formed by Dorset Carter of Purcell, Indian Territory, and other business interests. The corporation started life on September 20, 1904 as the Canadian Valley and Western Railway Company. It changed its name to the Oklahoma Central Railway Company on September 27, 1905. Construction was started in Lehigh, Oklahoma, in 1906 and was completed to Chickasha, Oklahoma, in 1908. The route was primarily constructed to transport coal from the mines at Lehigh to Purcell in order to service steam locomotives on the Santa Fe, which maintained a division point at that location.

The OCR trackage consisted of 127 miles (204 km) from Lehigh to Chickasha that included the stations of Lehigh, Ada, Vanoss, Stratford, Byars, Rosedale, Purcell, Washington, Cole, Blanchard, Middelberg, Tabler, and Chickasha. In addition, a 3 miles (4.8 km) branch extended from a point west of Lehigh into additional coal mines in Coal County.

The primary sources of revenue included transport of passengers and express, coal, cotton and cotton by-products, livestock, and building materials. After 1908 trains were operated as mixed trains.

== History ==
Financing for the OCR was largely provided by investors on the Amsterdam Stock Exchange, through a bond issue backed by veteran financial writer Frederik Van Oss. Carter, who was a prominent lawyer, banker, and developer in Purcell, I.T., approached Van Oss through a group of Chicago banking acquaintances and secured an initial issue of $852,000. Construction of the line began in late 1905 at Lehigh by the Canadian Valley Construction Company, which was also owned by Carter unbeknownst to the Dutch financiers. Preliminary cost estimates were quickly shown to be inadequate due to unexpected quantities of hard rock to be removed. The line was constructed with a maximum gradient of 2% and to Class I standards, despite being a short line.

Suspecting that a finance scam may have been underfoot, Van Oss sent a representative, Gerrit Middelberg, to Purcell to monitor the construction of the road and operations of the company. Middelberg's colorful letters belie a distaste for the living conditions and cuisine of the frontier, and a deep suspicion of Mr. Carter. In one letter he declares, "it is now apparent that the forces behind the railway and the construction company are one and the same." Van Oss refused to send additional funds, and construction crews camped a few miles west of Blanchard while waiting for additional rails to arrive. The community that developed from this camp was named Middelberg, in an apparent attempt to curry favor with the hard-lined Dutch overseer.

In addition to the dummy construction company that was "building" the line, the OCR also involved itself in forced real estate developments. Rather than constructing its road through existing townships, the OCR routed two or three miles (5 km) away from the community. Management would then negotiate with local farmers to purchase land (using bond notes supplied by the Dutch) and then plat a new town around the railroad. The communities were given the option of purchasing the new lots (for cash) or attempting to survive without rail service. This practice was well documented by the Chickasaw News in 1906, a newspaper from McGee, I.T., which was relocated by this process three miles (5 km) to south and is now called Stratford. This also may have occurred at Blanchard and Stonewall.

The OCR went into receivership in June 1908 and Asa E. Ramsey was appointed as receiver. Trains were reduced to mixed service (passenger and freight on the same train), and cost-cutting measures were introduced. Unfortunately, the coal-burning steam locomotives of the Santa Fe had primarily switched to fuel oil, and the coal traffic from Lehigh became less profitable. A coal miner's strike in 1911 ended the mines and the OCR lost a major component of its revenue stream. The assets of the Oklahoma Central Railway Company, along with its two affiliates—the Ada Terminal Railway Company and the Chickasha Terminal Railway Company-- were formed into a reorganized company called the Oklahoma Central Railroad Company, created as of July 31, 1914. That entity was controlled by the Atchison, Topeka and Santa Fe Railway (Santa Fe), through ownership of a majority of its capital stock, from August 1, 1914. The tracks of the new Oklahoma Central were also leased to and operated by the Santa Fe, with a purchase option. The line was merged into the Santa Fe in 1942.

Tracks from Lehigh to Ada and Purcell to Byars were removed in 1934, and Purcell-Chickasha in 1941. The segment from Byars to Ada was operated as a branch until 1971. Chickasha to Cole trackage was removed in 1956, and Cole to Purcell was abandoned in 1964.

== Spotting features and survivors ==
Lehigh

The mainline of the OCR is on the west side of highway 75 as it enters town. At the south edge of town, a wye curved to the east to service mine No. 8. The tracks curved west sharply at the north edge of town and passed between two mine pits on a narrow patch of unexcavated ground.

Ada

Ada was reached by a 1.93 mile long spur built by an Oklahoma Central affiliate, the Ada Terminal Railroad, that left the mainline near the present location of the US-177 junction. The depot at Ada, built by the Santa Fe in 1914, still stands on the west end of town.

Stratford

The Stratford depot is still standing on S. Hyden and is used as the city hall.

Washington

An abandoned bridge’s supports still stand, but there is no bridge platform, that has rotted away after years. In some fields by where the right of way was, you can find coal, and spikes.

Byars

From the south end of Byars Cemetery a large wooden trestle over a creek is still intact. The line passed directly behind the cemetery and curves to the north about 1 block west of it. North of town, the great earthworks that carried the OCR main line over the Santa Fe are still visible, including some cut off trestle pilings.

Purcell

Buried in the woods behind a large metal industrial building are the remains of the bridge approaches over Walnut Creek. This wooden bridge was washed out by a flood at an unknown date. The only stretch of surviving OCR main line is in place across the street to the north of this, a single switch and hundred feet or so of track. The switch was the interchange wye with the Santa Fe's Purcell yards; after 1934 this was the only way OCR trackage was accessed to the West. As of 2015, this too has been removed and only the ties remain overgrown by trees.

Blanchard

The original depot was located between 13th and 14th on Main Street (present day 5th and 6th street and main) according to the Sanborn Map Company Feb, 1926. There are no remnants of the depot today.

Chickasha

The excellent two story brick depot and offices are intact and presently being used by the Grady County Sheriff’s Office on the north side of town. The OCR crossed the present-day UP and BNSF diamonds at an angle from the southeast and backed into the station.

== Oklahoma Central Railroad (1987-1988) ==
The above is not to be confused with the Oklahoma Central Railroad formed January 12, 1987, which performed switching services at El Reno, Oklahoma. That railway ended service in 1988, and its line was then abandoned.
