= Stratford, Oklahoma =

Town in Oklahoma, US

- Town
- Motto: "Peach Capital of the World"
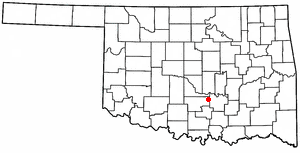
- Location of Stratford, Oklahoma
- Coordinates: 34°47′43″N 96°57′37″W
- Country: United States
- State: Oklahoma
- County: Garvin

Area
  - Total: 1.02 sq mi (2.63 km^{2})
  - Land: 1.01 sq mi (2.62 km^{2})
  - Water: 0.0039 sq mi (0.01 km^{2})
- Elevation: 1,106 ft (337 m)

Population (2020)
  - Total: 1,405
  - Density: 1,390/sq mi (536.6/km^{2})
- Time zone: UTC-6 (Central (CST))
  - Summer (DST): UTC-5 (CDT)
- ZIP code: 74872
- Area code: 580
- FIPS code: 40-70800
- GNIS feature ID: 2413340

Stratford is a town in Garvin County, Oklahoma, United States. Prior to Oklahoma statehood in 1907, the town existed under different names and was in the Chickasaw Nation in a geographic region known as Indian Territory. Peach orchards abound in and around the town. As of the 2020 census, the town’s population was 1,405.

== History ==
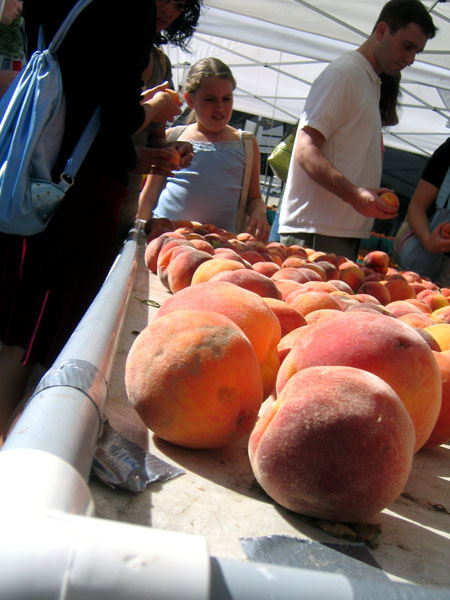
Stratford is the self-proclaimed Peach Capital of the World.

Stratford was originally the town of McGee, which was established in 1891. At the time, it was part of Pickens County, Chickasaw Nation in an unorganized geographic region of the United States known as Indian Territory In 1906 the Oklahoma Central Railroad built the railroad two miles south of McGee. The town placed its buildings on wagons and wheeled them down to the train tracks. The new town was first named Walling, but by October 1906 the name was changed to Stratford. Stratford is known as the Peach Capital of the World and holds its Peach Festival, annual rodeo, and car show the third Saturday each July. The festival has been held since 1976, while the rodeo dates back to 1936.

== Geography ==
Stratford is situated approximately halfway between Pauls Valley and Ada along State Highway 19, where it intersects U.S. Highway 177.

According to the United States Census Bureau, the town has a total area of 1.0 square mile (2.6 km^{2}), all land.

Stratford lies in a part of Oklahoma known for hills of 250 to 400 feet (120 m), oak forests and flat, fertile plains. There are more than 400 acres of peach orchards in and around the town.

Stratford has frequent variations in weather daily and seasonally, except during the consistently hot summer months. Consistent winds during the summer help temper the hotter weather. Consistent northerly winds during the winter can intensify cold periods.

== Demographics ==
Historical population
Census	Pop.	Note	%±
1910	685		—
1920	964		40.7%
1930	950		−1.5%
1940	896		−5.7%
1950	1,065		18.9%
1960	1,058		−0.7%
1970	1,278		20.8%
1980	1,459		14.2%
1990	1,404		−3.8%
2000	1,474		5.0%
2010	1,525		3.5%
2020	1,405		−7.9%
U.S. Decennial Census

=== 2020 census ===
As of the 2020 census, Stratford had a population of 1,405. The median age was 35.1 years. 29.6% of residents were under the age of 18 and 15.8% of residents were 65 years of age or older. For every 100 females there were 95.4 males, and for every 100 females age 18 and over there were 89.8 males age 18 and over.

0.0% of residents lived in urban areas, while 100.0% lived in rural areas.

There were 555 households in Stratford, of which 39.3% had children under the age of 18 living in them. Of all households, 38.9% were married-couple households, 19.8% were households with a male householder and no spouse or partner present, and 31.5% were households with a female householder and no spouse or partner present. About 28.8% of all households were made up of individuals and 14.2% had someone living alone who was 65 years of age or older.

There were 648 housing units, of which 14.4% were vacant. The homeowner vacancy rate was 0.9% and the rental vacancy rate was 13.0%.

Racial composition as of the 2020 census
Race	Number	Percent
White	973	69.3%
Black or African American	6	0.4%
American Indian and Alaska Native	196	14.0%
Asian	12	0.9%
Native Hawaiian and Other Pacific Islander	0	0.0%
Some other race	8	0.6%
Two or more races	210	14.9%
Hispanic or Latino (of any race)	59	4.2%

=== 2010 census ===
As of the census of 2010, there were 1,525 people, 609 households, and 408 families residing in the town. There were 728 housing units. The racial makeup of the town was 78.3% White, 0.5% African American, 15.5% Native American, 0.9% from other races, and 4.3% from two or more races. Hispanic or Latino of any race were 2.7% of the population.

There were 609 households, out of which 32.8% had children under the age of 18 living with them, 43.0% were married couples living together, 16.7% had a female householder with no husband present, and 33.0% were non-families. 29.1% of all households were made up of individuals, and 13.1% had someone living alone who was 65 years of age or older. The average household size was 2.50 and the average family size was 3.09.

In the town, the population was spread out, with 24.7% under the age of 15, 12.9% from 15 to 24, 25.8% from 25 to 44, 21.4% from 45 to 64, and 15.3% who were 65 years of age or older. The median age was 33.9 years. For every 100 females, there were 85.5 males. For every 100 females age 18 and over, there were 81.1 males.

The median income for a household in the town was $23,581, and the median income for a family was $28,690. Males had a median income of $29,118 versus $22,629 for females. The per capita income for the town was $14,141. About 31.9% of families and 27.8% of the population were below the poverty line, including 46.0% of those under age 18 and 10.7% of those age 65 or over.

== Notable person ==
- B. Kevin Turner, former COO of Microsoft and Walmart executive

== See also ==
- Garvin County, Oklahoma
