= Science Hall, Hays County, Texas =

Science Hall is a historical community located in Northeast San Marcos, Hays County, Texas, United States. It's located on a hill between Kyle and Buda.

== History ==
A pair of brothers, Whit Andrews and J. L. Andrews, bought pieces land about thirteen miles northeast of San Marcos in 1871, and used the site to start a town.

A school was then erected in the area named Science Hall, in which the settlement adopted as its name. In 1883, another privately built all-girls boarding school called the Science Hall Home Institute would be erected by Willie A. Andrews in her own residence. The boarding school operated lucratively for several years until at some point, Willie A. Andrews abandoned the school then moved to Austin.

In the 1890s, the settlement featured a gin, a store, a blacksmith shop, a church, as well as a post office that opened in March 1890 but would then relocate to Buda in 1892.
