= Fitzhugh, Oklahoma =

Town in Pontotoc County, Oklahoma, United States

- Town
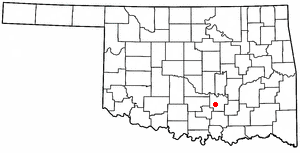
- Location of Fitzhugh, Oklahoma
- Coordinates: 34°39′29″N 96°45′59″W
- Country: United States
- State: Oklahoma
- County: Pontotoc

Government
  - Mayor: John Wingard

Area
  - Total: 7.27 sq mi (18.83 km^{2})
  - Land: 7.27 sq mi (18.83 km^{2})
  - Water: 0 sq mi (0.00 km^{2})
- Elevation: 1,286 ft (392 m)

Population (2020)
  - Total: 183
  - Density: 25.2/sq mi (9.72/km^{2})
- Time zone: UTC-6 (Central (CST))
  - Summer (DST): UTC-5 (CDT)
- ZIP code: 74843
- Area code: 580
- FIPS code: 40-26250
- GNIS feature ID: 2412627

Fitzhugh is a town in Pontotoc County, Oklahoma, United States. It is old enough to appear on a 1911 map of the county. The population was 183 at the 2020 census.

== Geography ==
According to the United States Census Bureau, the town has a total area of 7.3 square miles (19 km^{2}), all land.

== Demographics ==
Historical population
Census	Pop.	Note	%±
1990	196		—
2000	204		4.1%
2010	230		12.7%
2020	183		−20.4%
U.S. Decennial Census

=== 2020 census ===
As of the 2020 census, Fitzhugh had a population of 183. The median age was 44.4 years. 25.1% of residents were under the age of 18 and 19.1% of residents were 65 years of age or older. For every 100 females there were 98.9 males, and for every 100 females age 18 and over there were 104.5 males age 18 and over.

0.0% of residents lived in urban areas, while 100.0% lived in rural areas.

There were 77 households in Fitzhugh, of which 32.5% had children under the age of 18 living in them. Of all households, 46.8% were married-couple households, 29.9% were households with a male householder and no spouse or partner present, and 20.8% were households with a female householder and no spouse or partner present. About 19.5% of all households were made up of individuals and 9.1% had someone living alone who was 65 years of age or older.

There were 88 housing units, of which 12.5% were vacant. The homeowner vacancy rate was 3.1% and the rental vacancy rate was 5.9%.

Racial composition as of the 2020 census
Race	Number	Percent
White	143	78.1%
Black or African American	0	0.0%
American Indian and Alaska Native	23	12.6%
Asian	0	0.0%
Native Hawaiian and Other Pacific Islander	0	0.0%
Some other race	1	0.5%
Two or more races	16	8.7%
Hispanic or Latino (of any race)	3	1.6%

=== 2000 census ===
As of the census of 2000, there were 204 people, 75 households, and 62 families residing in the town. The population density was 28.0 inhabitants per square mile (10.8/km^{2}). There were 82 housing units at an average density of 11.3 per square mile (4.3/km^{2}). The racial makeup of the town was 82.35% White, 10.78% Native American, 0.98% from other races, and 5.88% from two or more races. Hispanic or Latino of any race were 0.98% of the population.

There were 75 households, out of which 46.7% had children under the age of 18 living with them, 72.0% were married couples living together, 6.7% had a female householder with no husband present, and 17.3% were non-families. 16.0% of all households were made up of individuals, and 5.3% had someone living alone who was 65 years of age or older. The average household size was 2.72 and the average family size was 3.05.

In the town, the population was spread out, with 31.9% under the age of 18, 11.8% from 18 to 24, 24.0% from 25 to 44, 19.6% from 45 to 64, and 12.7% who were 65 years of age or older. The median age was 31 years. For every 100 females, there were 82.1 males. For every 100 females age 18 and over, there were 93.1 males.

The median income for a household in the town was $35,208, and the median income for a family was $35,625. Males had a median income of $31,875 versus $27,500 for females. The per capita income for the town was $12,395. About 10.4% of families and 18.1% of the population were below the poverty line, including 15.7% of those under the age of eighteen and 12.9% of those 65 or over.

== Education ==
It is within the Roff Public Schools school district.

== See also ==
- List of towns in Oklahoma
