= Comm South Companies =

American prepaid home telephone companies

Comm South Companies, Inc., was an American prepaid home telephone companies. Before prepaid phone service, consumers had the choice of only signing up with their local telephone company for home phone service, such as Southwestern Bell, Pacific Bell, Alltel and GTE. Comm South Companies declared bankruptcy in 2003.
