= Wintersmith Park Historic District =

Historic district in Oklahoma, United States

- U.S. National Register of Historic Places
- U.S. Historic district
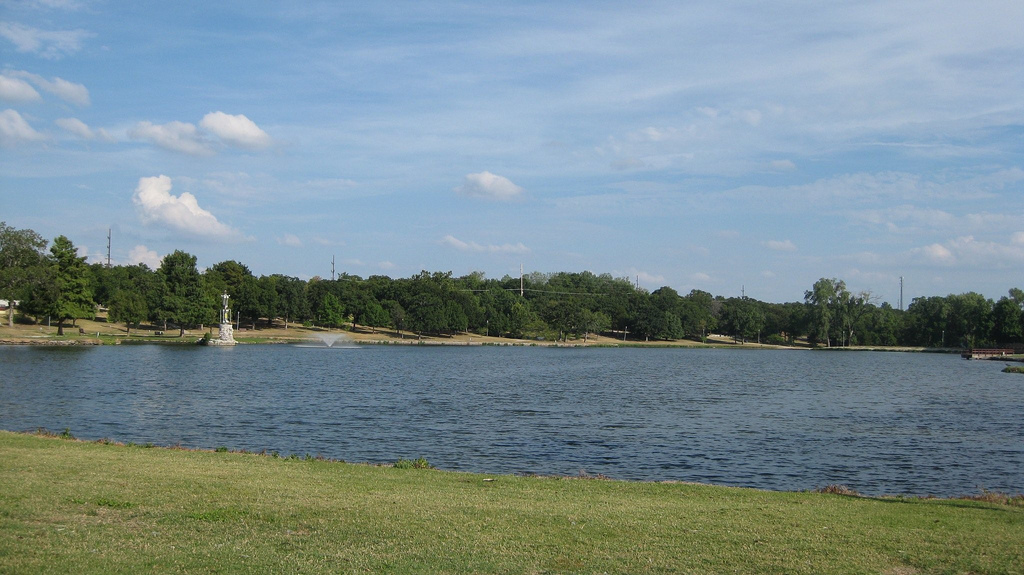
- Wintersmith Lake

- Location within Oklahoma Location within the United States
- Location: Ada, Oklahoma
- Coordinates: 34°45′34″N 96°39′15″W
- Built: 1933–34
- Architect: Charles E. Kroeger
- NRHP reference No.: 00000623
- Added to NRHP: 2000

The Wintersmith Park Historic District, known locally as simply Wintersmith Park, is a historic district located at 18th Street and Scenic Drive in Ada, Oklahoma. The park includes a lake, a lodge, bridges, trails, courts and a public amphitheater. The area is listed in the National Register of Historic Places. The park is named for Frances Wintersmith.

== Location and activities ==
Wintersmith Park is located on the southeastern edge of Ada. It is south of 18th Street, east of Scenic Drive and west of Country Club Road. The park contains 150 acres (0.61 km^{2}) of land, Wintersmith Lake, a public swimming pool and splash park, a lodge, courts for basketball, softball, volleyball and horseshoes, a 1.5-mile (2.4 km) lighted trail, eight picnic pavilions, a playground, a dog park, and a Kiwanis amusement park as well as bridges, trails and a public amphitheater.

== History ==
Wintersmith Park was a "New Deal" work program, created during the Great Depression by the Civilian Conservation Corps (CCC) to improve communities and provide wages for unemployed people. Work began on the park in 1933 when the young men of camp number 824 arrived in Ada. The men were paid a monthly wage of $30.

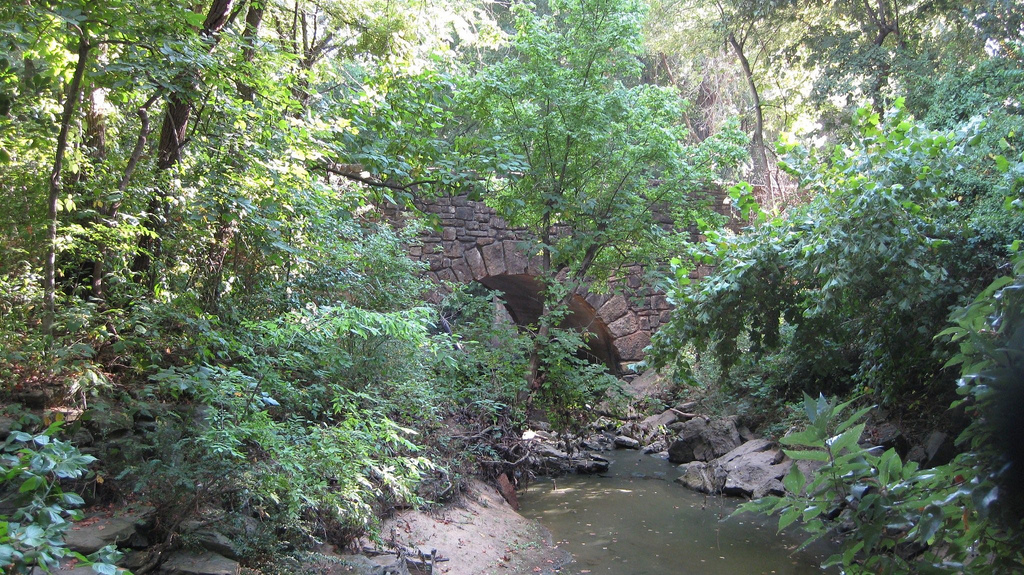
A Wintersmith Park Bridge

The Wintersmith project was unique among New Deal projects as it was the first time the National Park Service (NPS) would be working with the CCC on a project. The NPS usually worked only on the country's national parks.

The combined team would work for more than a year to transform 143 acres (0.58 km^{2}) on Ada's eastern edge. They built a lake, a lodge, bridges, trails, and a public amphitheater.

=== Public Amphitheater ===
Built into a naturally occurring slope on the parks south edge, the amphitheater consists of natural stone found in the park and stone quarried from nearby Fittstown, Oklahoma. A crew of stonemasons worked for three months to complete the project.

When completed in 1934, the amphitheater was arguably one of the most distinctive places in Oklahoma. The amphitheatre served as host for many community events, including plays, musicals, public speaking, beauty pageants, talent shows and community sings.

Over the years, however, the amphitheater had slid into disrepair. Frequent use, low level of maintenance and the elements combined to press the amphitheater into a worn out state. The cap stones that serve as seats were often broken, cracked or missing. The risers holding up the seats had suffered significant erosion damage. The barrier walls on the north and sound ends of the amphitheater were compromised or sometimes missing altogether.

Wintersmith Park Amphitheater

Dr. Marvin Kroeker, a longtime Ada resident and East Central University history professor emeritus, hoped to save the amphitheater and bring it back to its former glory. In 2000, Dr. Kroeker took Oklahoma State Historic Preservation Office deputy Melvena Heisch on a tour of the park and the amphitheater. He sought to convince Mrs. Heisch to nominate the amphitheater for designation on the National Register of Historic Places. After the tour, Mrs. Heisch determined the entire Wintersmith area, to be known as the Wintersmith historic district, should be nominated for the Register. The park, including the amphitheater, was accepted for the Register in June 2000.

Following the designation, Dr. Kroeker saw the opportunity to solicit funding from the Oklahoma Centennial Commission for restoration of the amphitheater. The Ada city council voted to designate the amphitheater Ada's Oklahoma Centennial project and made the application for funding from the Centennial Commission. The Centennial Commission accepted the amphitheater project application, and the project was funded with $150,000 of commission grants.

Jones Chapel Schoolhouse

Restoration of the amphitheater has begun. Student and adult volunteers have cleaned up the amphitheater and took down weeds and undergrowth. Dirt contractors have moved the earth to help protect the area from erosion. Concrete workers have poured the new handicap areas at the top and foot of the amphitheater. New “butternut” cap stones were put into place to replace the broken and missing seating.

Upcoming construction plans call for concrete drop off area and parking, concession and ticket buildings, walkways and a stage. Soon after restoration, a special production reintroducing the amphitheater, celebrating Oklahoma's centennial and recognizing the 75th anniversary of America's New Deal is expected.

=== Jones Chapel Schoolhouse ===
Jones Chapel Schoolhouse (also known as the "Little Red Schoolhouse") is located in the park off 18th Street. The schoolhouse opened in 1907 west of town. It was moved to the Kerr Lab area in 1976, where it was painted red, and then its current location in Wintersmith Park in 1990. The schoolhouse has many windows, which served both for light and air-conditioning when the building was in use.

Campbell Cabin

=== Campbell Cabin ===
The Campbell Cabin, located next to the schoolhouse, is another structure with historic significance to the area. The cabin represents Ada's early history in homemaking and demonstrates what it would have been like to live as a pioneer in a log cabin. A sign on the cabin reads "Cecil & Nell Campbell 1609 E 18th ST."
