= Ada Arts and Heritage Center =

- U.S. National Register of Historic Places
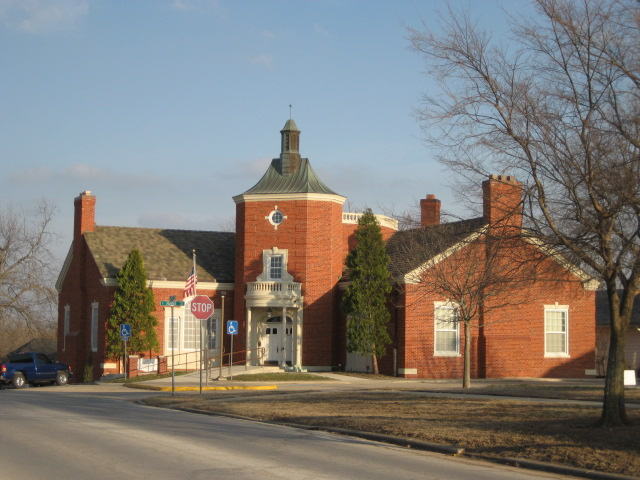
- Ada Arts and Heritage Center

- Location within Oklahoma Location within the United States
- Location: 400 S. Rennie, Ada, Oklahoma
- Coordinates: 34°46′15.79″N 96°40′35.3″W
- Area: less than one acre
- Built: 1938-39
- Built by: Chapman Construction Co.
- Architect: Albert S. Ross
- Architectural style: Colonial Revival
- NRHP reference No.: 89001950
- Added to NRHP: November 13, 1989

The Ada Arts and Heritage Center is a Colonial Revival styled building located at 400 South Rennie Street in Ada, Oklahoma. The building was listed on the National Register of Historic Places as Ada Public Library in 1989. The building was built in 1939 to serve as the public library of Ada. In 1981, having outgrown this original building, the Ada Public Library moved to its current location at 12th and Rennie.

Designed by architect Albert S. Ross, it was built by the Chapman Construction Co. during 1938–39. It was funded by a Public Works Administration grant and by a local bond issue.

The building was deemed "architecturally significant because its Y-shaped plan is unique in Oklahoma and because its designer, Albert S. Ross, is one of Oklahoma's foremost architects....the Ada building is generally considered 'to be Ross's finest achievement. The building is virtually pristine, retaining almost one hundred percent of its original materials and also retaining its integrity of workmanship, design, feeling, and association."

The building is now known as the Ada Arts and Heritage Center and serves as a museum with changing art displays and a collection of historic photographs.
