= Sugg Clinic =

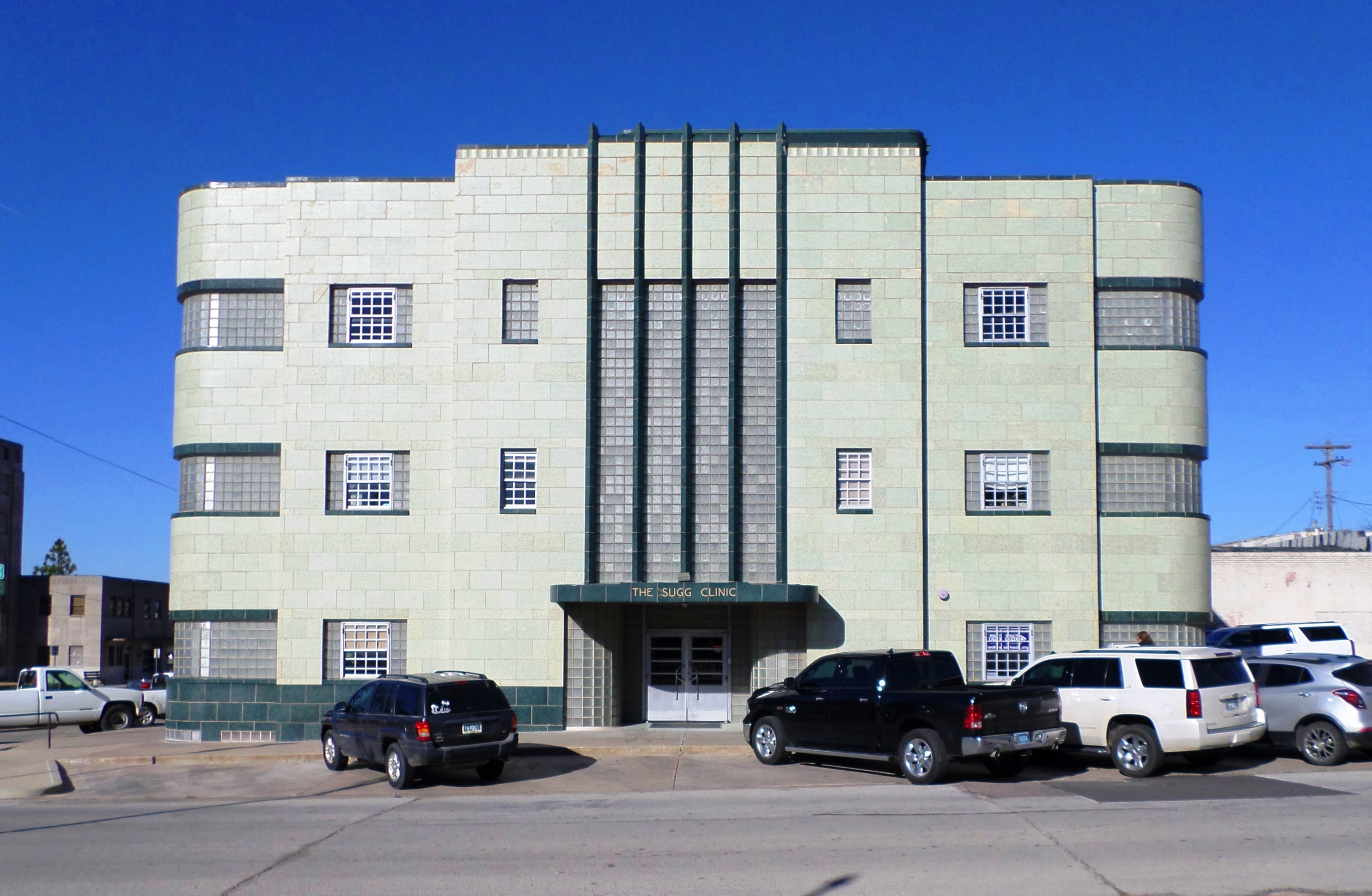
- The Sugg Clinic in 2018
- Interactive map of the Sugg Clinic area

General information
- Architectural style: Streamline Moderne
- Location: 100 E 13th Street, Ada, Oklahoma, United States
- Construction started: 1945
- Completed: 1947

Design and construction
- Architects: Albert S. Ross, with builder H. S. Moore

References
- Sugg Clinic
- U.S. National Register of Historic Places
- Location within Oklahoma Location within the United States
- Coordinates: 34°46′20″N 96°40′41″W
- Area: Less than one acre
- NRHP reference No.: 99001426
- Added to NRHP: November 30, 1999

The Sugg Clinic is considered an outstanding example of the Streamline Moderne architectural style. The building, which is listed in the National Register of Historic Places, is located at 100 E 13th Street in Ada, Oklahoma. Construction on the Sugg Clinic began in late 1945, and it opened in 1947. It was called "one of the best equipped clinics in the Southwest." Architect Albert S. Ross designed it to fulfill Dr. Alfred R. Sugg's dream of a large, modern clinic to serve the growing city. The Sugg Clinic features smooth tile walls, curved corners, glass block windows, and brushed aluminum trim. The clinic closed in 1980. After a period of vacancy, it was later restored as an office building.
