= F.W. Meaders House =

- U.S. National Register of Historic Places
- Location within Oklahoma
- Location: 521 South Broadway, Ada, Oklahoma
- Coordinates: 34°46′10″N 96°40′44″W
- Area: Less than one acre
- Built: 1929
- Architect: Albert S. Ross
- Architectural style: Classical Revival
- NRHP reference No.: 07000258
- Added to NRHP: April 4, 2007

The F.W. Meaders House, at 521 South Broadway in Ada, Oklahoma, was built in 1929. It was listed on the National Register of Historic Places in 2007.

It was designed by local architect Albert S. Ross. It was Classical Revival in style. The house was torn down by the First Baptist Church, circa 2011.
