= Pontotoc County Courthouse =

- U.S. National Register of Historic Places
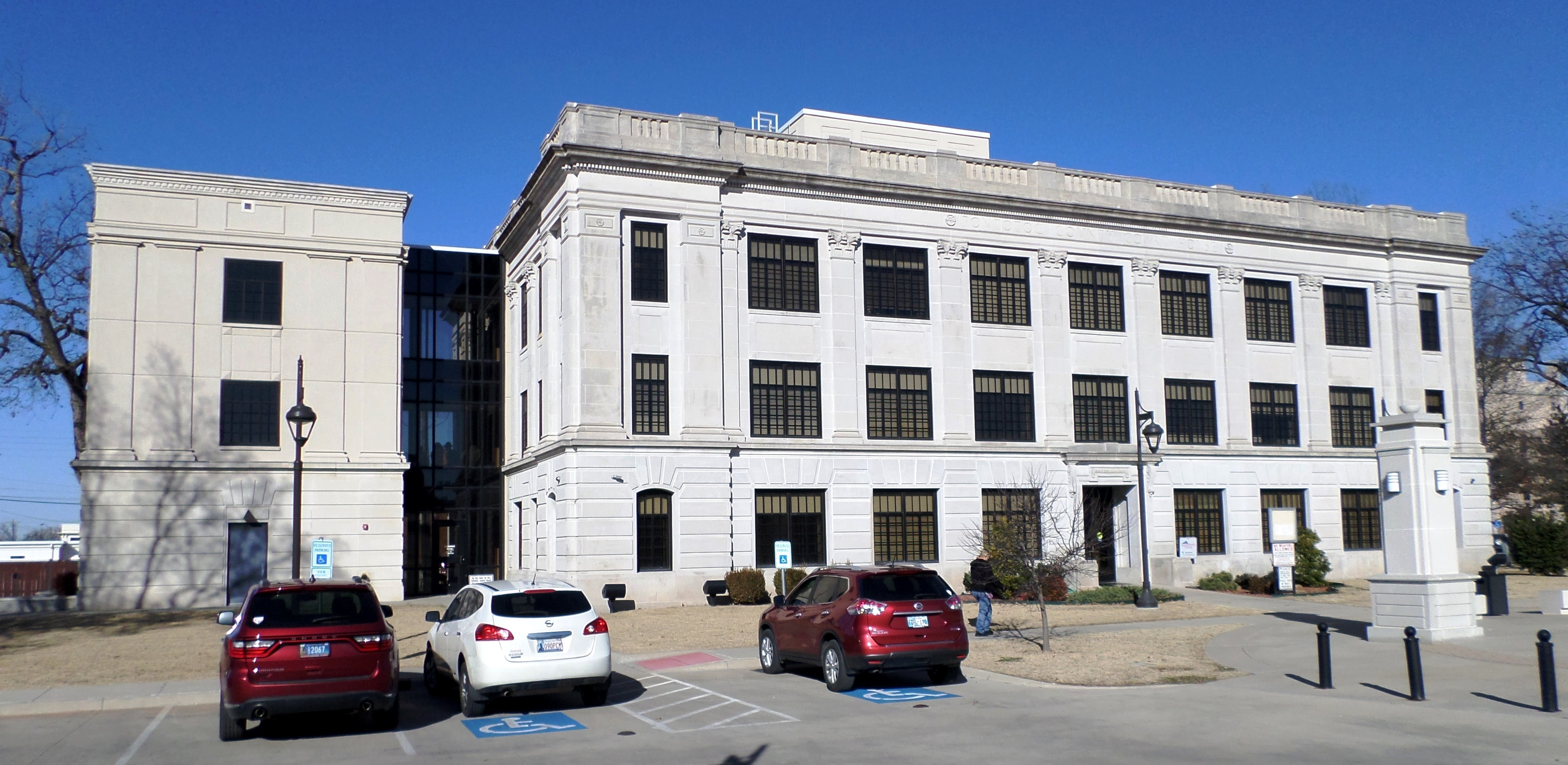
- Pontotoc County Court House

- Location within Oklahoma Location within the United States
- Interactive map showing the location of Pontotoc County Courthouse
- Location: 120 W. 13th St., Ada, Oklahoma
- Coordinates: 34.7726°N 96.6795°W
- Area: 1 acre (0.40 ha)
- Built: 1926
- Architect: Butler Co.
- Architectural style: Late 19th And 20th Century Revivals
- MPS: County Courthouses of Oklahoma TR
- NRHP reference No.: 84003418
- Added to NRHP: August 24, 1984

The Pontotoc County Courthouse is a historic courthouse in Ada, Oklahoma. The building has been listed on the National Register of Historic Places since 1984. The county built the structure in 1926. In 2011, the courthouse underwent extensive remodeling.
