= Ada, Oklahoma =

- City
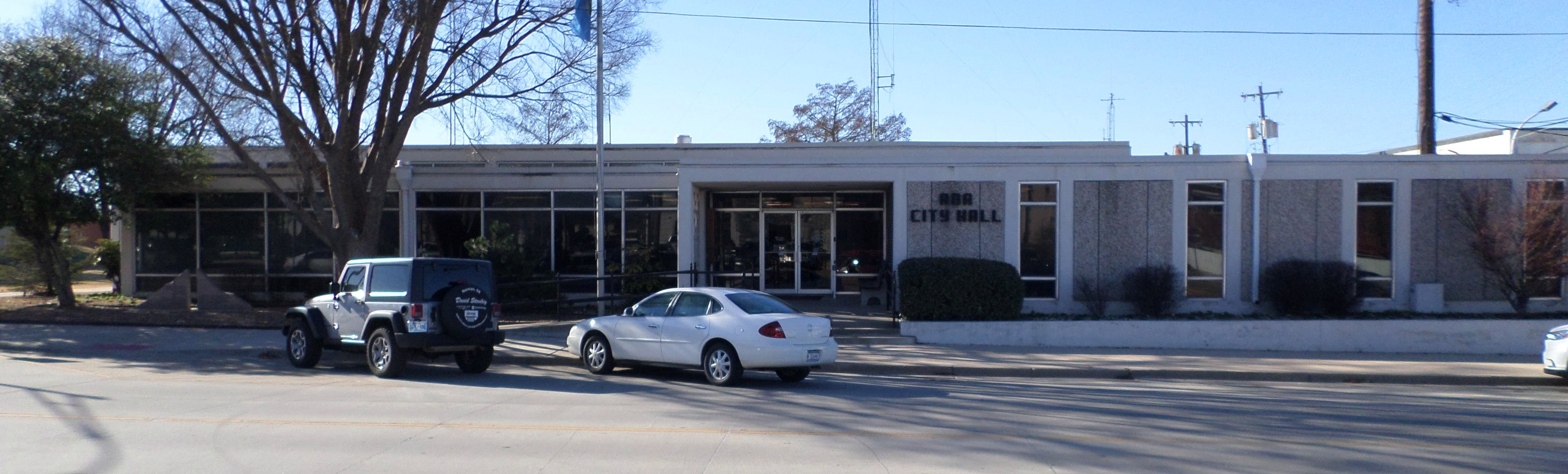
- Ada City Hall (2018)

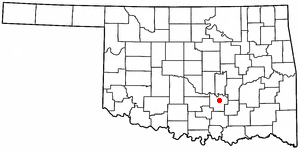
- Location in the state of Oklahoma
- Coordinates: 34°45′49″N 96°40′06″W
- Country: United States
- State: Oklahoma
- County: Pontotoc
- Founded: 1891 (post office)

Government
  - Type: Mayor–Council
  - Mayor: Tre Landrum

Area
  - Total: 20.20 sq mi (52.32 km^{2})
  - Land: 20.14 sq mi (52.17 km^{2})
  - Water: 0.058 sq mi (0.15 km^{2}) 0%
- Elevation: 1,011 ft (308 m)

Population (2020)
  - Total: 16,481
  - Density: 818.2/sq mi (315.9/km^{2})
  - Demonym: Adan
- Time zone: UTC−6 (CST)
  - Summer (DST): UTC−5 (CDT)
- ZIP Codes: 74820-74821
- Area code: 580
- FIPS code: 40-00200
- GNIS ID: 2409660
- Website: adaok.com

Ada is a city in and the county seat of Pontotoc County, Oklahoma, United States. The population was 16,481 at the 2020 United States census. The city was named for Ada Reed, the daughter of an early settler, and was incorporated in 1901. Ada is home to East Central University, and is the capital of the Chickasaw Nation. Ada is an Oklahoma Main Street City, an Oklahoma Certified City, and a Tree City USA member.

== History ==
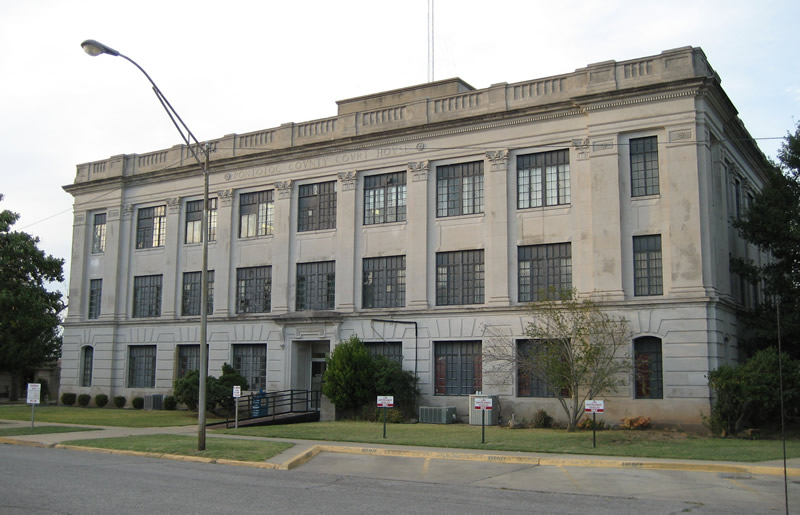
Pontotoc County Courthouse in Ada

In the late 1880s, the Daggs family (by way of Texas) became the first white family to settle what is now known as Ada, which was formerly known as Daggs Prairie. In April 1889, Jeff Reed (a Texan and relative of the Daggs family) was appointed to carry the mail from Stonewall to Center (which was later combined with Pickett), two small communities in then Indian Territory. With his family and his stock, he sought a place for a home on a prairie midway between the two points, where he constructed a log house and started Reed's Store. Other settlers soon built homes nearby. In 1891, a post office was established and named after Reed's oldest daughter, Ada. Ada incorporated as a city in 1901 and grew rapidly with the arrival of the St. Louis and San Francisco Railway line. Within a decade the Santa Fe Railroad and the Oklahoma Central Railway also served the town.

Ada was originally a sundown town, where African Americans were not allowed to live. In the 1900s, the town was opened up to African Americans so that black witnesses could stay while testifying in district court. Ada began allowing Black people to open restaurants, barber shops, stores, and hotels by court order as to offer places where "negro witnesses might stay during the [court] session". Unnamed individuals threatened them, writing that "unless they left the town immediately they must suffer the consequences." When the threats went unanswered, unnamed parties blew up a Black restaurant with dynamite, seriously injuring one occupant. According to the Arkansas City Daily Traveler article, published on March 30, 1904, "This action has been condemned by many citizens and a reward has been offered for arrest of the guilty parties...most citizens now believe negroes should be allowed to live there." After the incident, the town remained open to African Americans to provide labor for a local cotton compress.

In 1909, the women of Ada organized an effort to build a normal school in their city. It resulted in the founding of East Central College (now East Central University).

On April 19, 1909, an organized mob hanged four men, among whom was American outlaw Deacon Jim Miller, who was set to be tried for the murder of a former U.S. marshal and member of the local freemason lodge. The town had a population of about 5,000 at the time, and 38 murders a year at the time of the lynching. The Daily Ardmoreite reported that the four lynched men were "one of the bloodiest band of murderers in the state of Oklahoma and an organization of professional assassins, that for a record of blood crimes, probably has no equal in the annals of criminal history in the entire southwest".

The first manufacturing company in Ada, the Portland Cement Company, installed the first cement clinker in Oklahoma in 1910. American Glass Casket Company began manufacturing glass caskets in 1916, but the business failed. Hazel Atlas Glass bought the plant in 1928 and produced glass products until 1991.

=== National Register of Historic Places ===
The following sites in Ada are listed on the National Register of Historic Places listings in Pontotoc County, Oklahoma:

- Ada Arts and Heritage Center
- Bebee Field Round House
- East Central State Normal School
- F.W. Meaders House
- Mijo Camp Industrial District
- Pontotoc County Courthouse
- Sugg Clinic
- Wintersmith Park Historic District

== Geography ==
Ada is located within the rolling hills of southeastern Oklahoma. Ada is 88 miles (142 km) from Oklahoma City, 122 mi (196 km) from Tulsa, and 133 mi (214 km) from Dallas, Texas.

According to the United States Census Bureau, the city has a total area of 15.8 square miles (40.9 km^{2}), of which 15.7 square miles (40.7 km^{2}) is land and 0.1 square miles (0.3 km^{2}) (0.44%) is water.

=== Climate ===
Climate data for Ada, Oklahoma
Month	Jan	Feb	Mar	Apr	May	Jun	Jul	Aug	Sep	Oct	Nov	Dec	Year
Record high °F (°C)	84 (29)	90 (32)	96 (36)	99 (37)	100 (38)	106 (41)	109 (43)	116 (47)	109 (43)	98 (37)	88 (31)	85 (29)	116 (47)
Mean daily maximum °F (°C)	51 (11)	56 (13)	65 (18)	75 (24)	80 (27)	89 (32)	94 (34)	94 (34)	87 (31)	76 (24)	64 (18)	54 (12)	74 (23)
Mean daily minimum °F (°C)	30 (−1)	34 (1)	41 (5)	50 (10)	59 (15)	67 (19)	71 (22)	70 (21)	63 (17)	52 (11)	40 (4)	33 (1)	51 (11)
Record low °F (°C)	−10 (−23)	1 (−17)	3 (−16)	23 (−5)	34 (1)	42 (6)	55 (13)	50 (10)	34 (1)	19 (−7)	11 (−12)	—	−10 (−23)
Average precipitation inches (mm)	2.1 (53)	2.1 (53)	2.7 (69)	4 (100)	5.9 (150)	4.4 (110)	2.8 (71)	3.2 (81)	3.4 (86)	3.6 (91)	2.4 (61)	2.3 (58)	38.8 (990)
Average snowfall inches (cm)	2.7 (6.9)	1.3 (3.3)	0.8 (2.0)	0 (0)	0 (0)	0 (0)	0 (0)	0 (0)	0 (0)	0 (0)	0 (0)	0.6 (1.5)	5.4 (14)
Source: Weatherbase

== Demographics ==
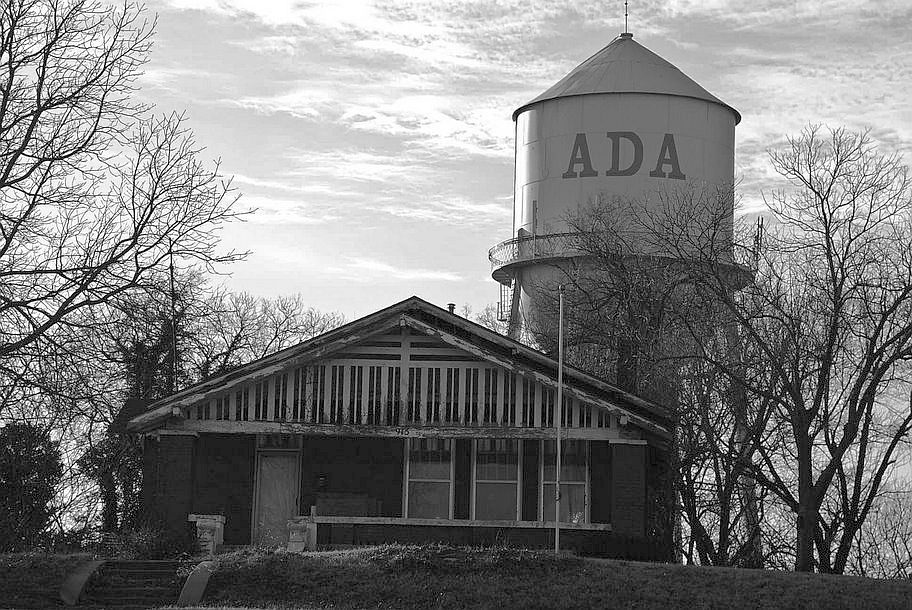
Picture taken on Broadway of the former Stout family residence with one of the city's water towers behind it.

Historical population
Census	Pop.	Note	%±
1910	4,349		—
1920	8,012		84.2%
1930	11,261		40.6%
1940	15,143		34.5%
1950	15,995		5.6%
1960	14,347		−10.3%
1970	14,859		3.6%
1980	15,902		7.0%
1990	15,820		−0.5%
2000	15,691		−0.8%
2010	16,810		7.1%
2020	16,481		−2.0%

=== 2020 census ===
As of the 2020 census, Ada had a population of 16,481 and a median age of 34.2 years. 22.5% of residents were under the age of 18 and 16.2% were 65 years of age or older. For every 100 females there were 88.1 males, and for every 100 females age 18 and over there were 85.1 males. There were 6,967 households and 3,552 families recorded at the census.

Of those households, 28.4% had children under the age of 18 living in them, 33.3% were married-couple households, 22.0% were households with a male householder and no spouse or partner present, and 37.2% were households with a female householder and no spouse or partner present. About 37.1% of all households were made up of individuals and 14.3% had someone living alone who was 65 years of age or older.

There were 8,194 housing units, of which 15.0% were vacant. Among occupied housing units, 43.6% were owner-occupied and 56.4% were renter-occupied, with a homeowner vacancy rate of 3.4% and a rental vacancy rate of 11.2%.

93.1% of residents lived in urban areas, while 6.9% lived in rural areas.

Racial composition as of the 2020 census
Race	Percent
White	56.1%
Black or African American	4.3%
American Indian and Alaska Native	17.9%
Asian	1.8%
Native Hawaiian and Other Pacific Islander	<0.1%
Some other race	3.0%
Two or more races	16.7%
Hispanic or Latino (of any race)	7.8%

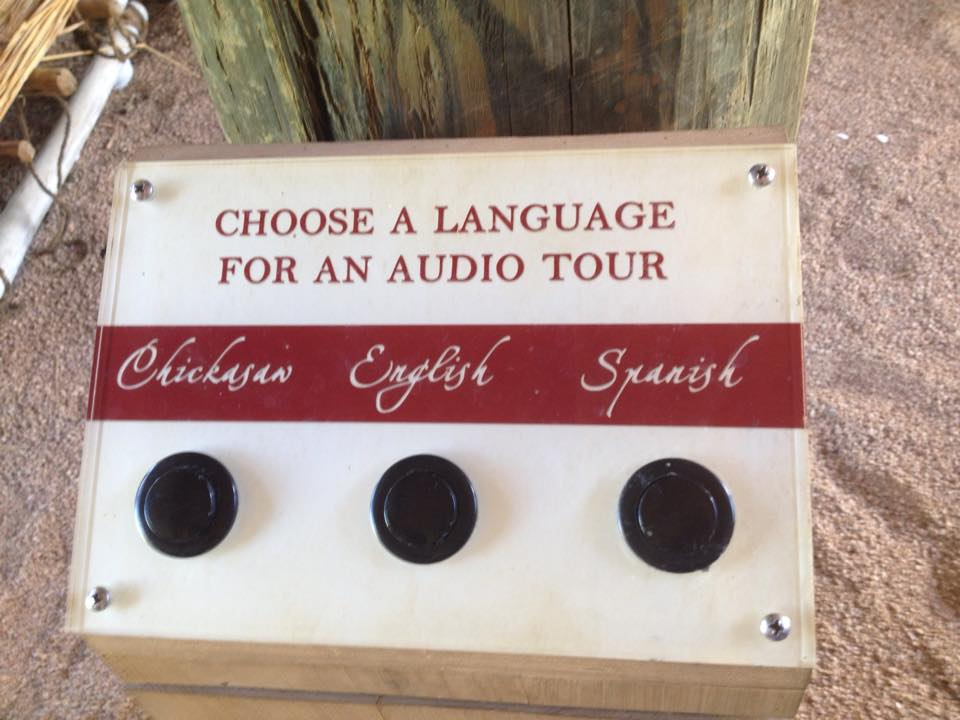
Language offerings for audio tours at the Chickasaw Cultural Center, including Chickasaw, English, and Spanish.

=== 2010 census ===
As of the 2010 census, Ada's 16,810 residents consisted of 6,697 households and 3,803 families. The population density was 999.3 inhabitants per square mile (385.8/km^{2}). The 7,862 housing units were dispersed at an average density of 475.9 per square mile (183.7/km^{2}). Ada's 2006 racial makeup was 73.81% White, 3.54% African American, 15.10% Native American, 0.83% Asian, 0.01% Pacific Islander, 0.89% from other races, and 5.81% from two or more races. Hispanics or Latinos of any race were 2.89% of the population.

Of Ada's 6,697 households, 25.9% had children under the age of 18 living with them, 40.6% were married couples living together, 12.6% had a female householder with no husband present, and 43.2% were non-families. The 15.8% of those 65 years or older living alone made up a substantial portion of the 37.1% single-person households. Average household size was 2.20 persons; average family size was 2.91.

The age breakdown in 2006 was 22.3% under the age of 18, 17.5% from 18 to 24, 24.4% from 25 to 44, 18.9% from 45 to 64, and 17.0% aged 65 or older. The median age was 33 years. For every 100 females aged 18 or over, there were 84.5 males, while for all ages, there were 100 females for every 88.4 males.

Median household income was $22,977, while median family income was $31,805. Males had a median income of $25,223 versus $17,688 for females. Ada's per capita income was $14,666. Some 14.8% of families and 21.4% of the population were below the poverty line, including 27.8% of those under 18 and 11.4% of those 65 or over.

An estimated 2,000-3,000 residents speak the Chickasaw language.

== Culture ==
- McSwain Theatre, opened in 1920

== Economy ==
The economy of Ada is diversified. In the mid and late 20th century, the town was a manufacturing center, producing products such as Wrangler jeans, auto parts, cement and concrete, plasticware, and other products. Since the start of the 21st century, manufacturers have made major investments in expansions and new technology.

In 1975, the Chickasaw Nation opened its headquarters in Ada. Revenues for the Nation were over 12 billion dollars in 2011, most of which is funneled through Ada. The Robert S. Kerr Environmental Research Center, a large water research lab staffed by the Environmental Protection Agency, opened in 1966. LegalShield, a multi-level marketing provider of pre-paid legal services, is headquartered in the city. Oil and natural gas remain a part of the regional economy.

The largest employers in the region are:

- Ada City Schools
- Chickasaw Nation
- East Central University
- Pontotoc County Technology Center
- Dart Container (formerly Solo Cup)
- Flex-N-Gate (auto parts manufacturer)
- Holcim Inc. (Portland cement)
- LegalShield
- Power Lift Foundation Repair
- State of Oklahoma
- Walmart
- Kerr Lab
- Mercy Hospital Ada
- City of Ada

== Education ==
=== Higher education ===
East Central University, located in Ada, is a public four-year institution that has been in operation since 1909. ECU serves roughly 4,500 students. ECU is also home to an Environmental Health Science Program, one of only 30 programs nationally accredited by the National Environmental Health Science and Protection Accreditation Council (EHAC).

=== Primary and secondary ===
The majority of Ada is within the Ada Public Schools school district.

Ada Public Schools has six primary and secondary schools.

- Glenwood Early Childhood Center
- Hayes Grade Center
- Washington Grade Center
- Willard Grade Center
- Ada Junior High School
- Ada High School

Other school districts which have portions of Ada include: Byng Public Schools, Latta Public Schools, and Stonewall Public Schools. The Latta district has one comprehensive high school: Latta High School.

=== Technical school ===
Pontotoc Technology Center (formerly Pontotoc Area Vo-Tech) is located in Ada.

== Infrastructure ==
=== Highways ===
Major highways are:

- Oklahoma State Highway 3
- U.S. Route 377

=== Rail ===
Rail Freight is serviced by BNSF and a Union Pacific shoreline.

=== Air ===
The Ada Regional Airport (FAA Identifier: ADH), owned and operated by the City of Ada, is located two miles north of downtown, and is home to two major aeronautical industries—General Aviation Modifications, Inc. and Tornado Alley Turbo. From the early 1950s well into the 1960s, the airport was served by Central Airlines.

== Media ==
=== Radio ===
==== AM ====
- KADA/1230: rock "Pirate Radio" (simulcasts on FM translator K272FW).

==== FM ====
- KAJT/88.7: religion "Son Life Radio".
- KAKO/91.3: religion (American Family Radio).
- KOUA/91.9: public radio (NPR affiliate).
- KADA-FM/99.3: oldies "Cool 99.3".

===== FM translators =====
- K212FZ/90.3: religion "K-Love"
- K250AU/97.9: public radio (relays KOUA)
- K272FW/102.3: rock (relays KADA (AM)).
- K286BB/105.1: religion "The Gospel Station".

== Notable people ==
- Bill Anoatubby – Governor of the Chickasaw Nation since 1987
- Vaughn Ary – Staff Judge Advocate to the Commandant of the United States Marine Corps
- Nick Blackburn – former Minnesota Twins starting pitcher
- Harry Brecheen – former Major League Baseball All Star pitcher; graduated from Ada High School; buried at Ada's Rosedale Cemetery
- Josh Brecheen – U.S. representative for Oklahoma
- Orel Busby – attorney, lived in Ada from 1912 until appointed Associate Justice of Oklahoma Supreme Court; returned to Ada after retiring from the court in 1937
- Jeff Carpenter, musician and songwriter with the all Native American orchestral rock band Injunuity
- Dan Cody – Baltimore Ravens linebacker; born in Ada
- Johnson T. Crawford – Nuremberg trial judge
- John Daversa – Grammy Award-winning jazz trumpeter, composer/arranger, bandleader, and educator
- Denver Davison – attorney, lived in Ada from 1927 until appointed Associate Justice of Oklahoma Supreme Court in 1937; returned to Ada after retiring from the court in 1958
- Douglas Edwards – first television network anchor
- Lee Erwin – television writer
- Josh Fields – former Major League Baseball infielder; born in Ada
- Mark Gastineau – National Football League star, ECU graduate
- Monte Hale – Western-genre film star; born in Ada
- Johny Hendricks – UFC Welterweight Champion
- Anthony Armstrong Jones – country music singer
- David West Keirsey (1921–2013) – psychologist, developed the Keirsey Temperament Sorter; born in Ada
- Robert S. Kerr – former Oklahoma Governor and long-time U.S. Senator; born in Ada
- Steven Lawayne Nelson – American convicted murderer; born in Ada
- Louise S. Robbins – Wisconsin Librarian of the Year (2001); named one of Oklahoma's 100 Library Legends; director of the School of Library and Information Studies at University of Wisconsin–Madison; author of two award-winning books; longtime resident of Ada and first woman city council member and mayor
- Oral Roberts – evangelist, founder of Oral Roberts University; born near Ada.
- Blaine Saunders – actress, The Middle
- Blake Shelton – country music singer with multiple No. 1 hit songs, coach on The Voice
- Jeremy Shockey – former NFL tight end; born and grew up in Ada
- Leon Polk Smith – abstract artist known for his work with geometric painting; graduate of East Central University
- Jerry Walker – major league pitcher and front office executive
- Ron Williamson – minor league baseball player wrongly convicted and sentenced to death in 1988 in Ada for rape and murder but eventually exonerated. Subject of The Innocent Man by John Grisham.

== In popular culture ==
Because of its short, palindromic spelling with frequently used letters, Ada is a very common crossword puzzle answer. Associated clues often include "Oklahoma city", "Oklahoma palindrome", and "Sooner State city."

== Controversies ==
In 1987, journalist Robert Mayer published The Dreams of Ada exploring major flaws, irregularities, forced confessions, and possible miscarriages of justice in Ada in the convictions of Tommy Ward and Karl Fontenot for the rape and murder of Denice Haraway, who died in 1984.

In 2006, John Grisham brought Ada into the national spotlight in his nonfiction work The Innocent Man, relating a similar story in the convictions of Ron Williamson and Dennis Fritz for the murder of Debra Sue Carter. After 12 years on death row, DNA evidence proved the men's innocence and established the guilt of the prosecution's main witness. Similar problems surrounded the trials of the two men convicted for the murder of Denice Haraway. Prosecutor Bill Peterson has self-published his disagreements with Grisham's version of events.

In 2018, Grisham's book was adapted into a Netflix series, also titled The Innocent Man, combining and extending the cases outlined in his and Mayer's books.

== See also ==
- List of sundown towns in the United States
