= National Register of Historic Places listings in Lincoln County, Oklahoma =

Location of Lincoln County in Oklahoma

This is a list of the National Register of Historic Places listings in Lincoln County, Oklahoma.

This is intended to be a complete list of the properties and districts on the National Register of Historic Places in Lincoln County, Oklahoma, United States. The locations of National Register properties and districts for which the latitude and longitude coordinates are included below, may be seen in a map.

Three Colonial Revival houses in Chandler were subject of the "Territorial Homes of Chandler" multiple property submission, which led to the Conklin and Johnson Houses being listed.

There are 46 properties and districts listed on the National Register in the county. Another property was once listed but has since been removed.

This National Park Service list is complete through NPS recent listings posted March 27, 2026.

== Current listings ==
	Name on the Register	Image	Date listed	Location	City or town	Description
1	Bon Ton House	Bon Ton House	September 26, 1986 (#86002350)	404 N. 4th St. 35°45′03″N 96°39′27″W	Stroud	
2	Boston Store	Boston Store	April 5, 1984 (#84003107)	917 Manvel Ave. 35°42′03″N 96°52′31″W	Chandler	
3	Captain Creek Bridge	Captain Creek Bridge	March 3, 2004 (#04000134)	West of the junction of Hickory St. and State Highway 66B; 35°41′35″N 97°04′16″W	Wellston	
4	Joseph Carpenter House	Joseph Carpenter House	September 26, 1986 (#86002346)	204 W. 6th St. 35°45′06″N 96°39′19″W	Stroud	
5	Chandler Armory	Chandler Armory	March 14, 1991 (#91000276)	Junction of Mickey Clarkson Ave. and 1st St. 35°42′34″N 96°52′36″W	Chandler	
6	Chandler Baseball Camp	Chandler Baseball Camp	October 12, 2011 (#11000339)	2000 W. Park Rd. 35°42′22″N 96°54′06″W	Chandler	
7	Chandler Bookstore	Chandler Bookstore	April 5, 1984 (#84003110)	713 Manvel Ave. 35°42′12″N 96°52′31″W	Chandler	
8	Chandler High School	Chandler High School	April 4, 1996 (#96000372)	515 Steele Ave. 35°42′18″N 96°52′55″W	Chandler	
9	Clapp-Cunningham Building	Clapp-Cunningham Building	April 5, 1984 (#84003112)	1021 Manvel Ave. 35°41′59″N 96°52′52″W	Chandler	
10	Conklin House	Conklin House	September 28, 1984 (#84003116)	206 W. 8th St. 35°42′09″N 96°52′56″W	Chandler	Along with the NRHP-listed Johnson House, one of three pre-statehood Colonial Revival houses in Chandler recognized in "Territorial Homes of Chandler" multiple property submission.
11	Crane Motor Company Building	Crane Motor Company Building	February 23, 1995 (#95000036)	722 Manvel Ave. 35°42′10″N 96°52′49″W	Chandler	
12	Crescent School	Crescent School	April 4, 1996 (#96000373)	2.5 miles east and 0.25 miles north of the junction of U.S. Route 62 and State Highway 18; 35°30′23″N 96°51′01″W	Meeker vicinity	
13	Davenport Broadway Avenue Brick Street	Davenport Broadway Avenue Brick Street	May 27, 2004 (#04000518)	1-600 Broadway St. 35°42′09″N 96°45′53″W	Davenport	
14	Fairview School	Fairview School	September 18, 1997 (#97001149)	2.25 miles north-northwest of the junction of U.S. Route 62 and State Highway 18; 35°32′11″N 96°54′09″W	Meeker vicinity	
15	First Presbyterian Church of Chandler	First Presbyterian Church of Chandler	September 28, 1984 (#84003118)	8th and Blaine Sts. 35°42′10″N 96°52′58″W	Chandler	
16	Flynt Building	Flynt Building	June 5, 2007 (#07000516)	720 Manvel Ave. 35°42′10″N 96°52′48″W	Chandler	
17	Graham Hotel		May 22, 1979 (#79001998)	Main St. and 2nd Ave. 35°44′57″N 96°39′16″W	Stroud	Destroyed
18	Hadley House	Hadley House	November 13, 1984 (#84000457)	622 N. 4th Ave. 35°45′10″N 96°39′27″W	Stroud	
19	Walter Hadley House	Walter Hadley House	September 26, 1986 (#86002308)	424 W. 7th St. 35°45′10″N 96°39′30″W	Stroud	
20	Hotel Lincoln	Hotel Lincoln	February 23, 1995 (#95000037)	323 Main St. 35°44′57″N 96°39′26″W	Stroud	
21	George Hughes House	George Hughes House	September 26, 1986 (#86002370)	308 W. 5th St. 35°45′03″N 96°39′23″W	Stroud	
22	Johnson House	Johnson House	September 28, 1984 (#84003121)	503 Marvel Ave. 35°42′20″N 96°52′51″W	Chandler	Along with the NRHP-listed Conklin House, one of three pre-statehood Colonial Revival houses in Chandler recognized in "Territorial Homes of Chandler" multiple property submission.
23	Moses Keokuk House		June 19, 1973 (#73001563)	6 miles south of Stroud; 35°41′27″N 96°42′00″W	Stroud	Burned in 2002
24	Mascho Building and Public Privy	Mascho Building and Public Privy	April 5, 1984 (#84003127)	717-719 Manvel Ave. 35°42′11″N 96°52′31″W	Chandler	
25	Meeker Town Hall	Meeker Town Hall	April 4, 1996 (#96000374)	115 N. Fowler St. 35°30′14″N 96°54′09″W	Meeker	
26	William Alfred Mensch Building	William Alfred Mensch Building	December 28, 2000 (#00001576)	218 W. Main St. 35°44′55″N 96°39′20″W	Stroud	
27	Midlothian School	Midlothian School	April 4, 1996 (#96000375)	2.25 miles west and 4 miles south of the junction of State Highway 18 and the former U.S. Route 66; 35°38′15″N 96°55′35″W	Midlothian	
28	National Guard Statistical Building	National Guard Statistical Building	June 3, 1999 (#99000672)	Park Rd., 1 block west of 6th St. 35°42′12″N 96°53′11″W	Chandler	
29	Oleson-Crane Building	Oleson-Crane Building	April 5, 1984 (#84003129)	721 Manvel Ave. 35°42′10″N 96°52′31″W	Chandler	
30	Ozark Trails Section of Route 66	Ozark Trails Section of Route 66	December 5, 2003 (#03001235)	Junction of N3540 Rd. and E0890 Rd. west to the junction of E0890 Rd. and the St. Louis – San Francisco railroad tracks. 35°43′26″N 96°42′33″W	Stroud	
31	Phillips 66 Station No. 1423	Phillips 66 Station No. 1423	September 8, 2011 (#11000640)	701 S. Manvel; 35°42′12″N 96°52′52″W	Chandler	Route 66 in Oklahoma MPS
32	Prague City Hall and Jail	Prague City Hall and Jail	June 26, 1998 (#98000732)	1116 Jim Thorpe Boulevard; 35°29′18″N 96°41′08″W	Prague	
33	Rock Café	Rock Café	June 14, 2001 (#01000661)	114 W. Main St. 35°44′55″N 96°39′15″W	Stroud	
34	St. Cloud Hotel	St. Cloud Hotel	April 5, 1984 (#84003131)	1216 Manvel Ave. 35°41′53″N 96°52′32″W	Chandler	
35	St. Paul Baptist Church and Cemetery	St. Paul Baptist Church and Cemetery	September 13, 2002 (#02000973)	4.25 miles north and 1.5 miles west of the junction of U.S. Route 62 and State Highway 18; 35°33′53″N 96°54′37″W	Meeker vicinity	
36	St. Stephen's Episcopal Church	St. Stephen's Episcopal Church	June 9, 2000 (#00000655)	812 Blaine Ave. 35°42′08″N 96°52′57″W	Chandler	
37	Seaba's Filling Station	Seaba's Filling Station	February 9, 1995 (#94001609)	336992 E. Highway 66; 35°41′11″N 96°59′59″W	Warwick	
38	Southwestern Bell Telephone Building	Southwestern Bell Telephone Building	May 14, 1986 (#86001093)	301 W. 7th St. 35°45′13″N 96°39′24″W	Stroud	
39	Spring Dell School	Spring Dell School	April 4, 1996 (#96000376)	5 miles south and 0.5 miles west of the junction of State Highway 18 and the former U.S. Route 66; 35°37′32″N 96°53′32″W	Meeker vicinity	
40	Old Stroud School	Old Stroud School	September 18, 1997 (#97001150)	1 mile east of the junction of Interstate 44 and State Highway 99; 35°45′13″N 96°40′51″W	Stroud	
41	Stroud Trading Company Building	Stroud Trading Company Building	December 27, 1979 (#79001999)	Main St. and 2nd Ave. 35°44′57″N 96°39′18″W	Stroud	
42	James W. Stroud House	James W. Stroud House	March 8, 1984 (#84003134)	110 E. 2nd St. 35°44′52″N 96°39′11″W	Stroud	
43	Marshal William M. Tilghman Homestead		January 11, 1976 (#76001568)	2 miles northwest of Chandler off the former U.S. Route 66; 35°43′47″N 96°54′42″W	Chandler	Burned in 1993.
44	Warwick School	Warwick School	April 4, 1996 (#96000377)	0.75 miles east and 0.25 miles north of the junction of U.S. Route 177 and the former U.S. Route 66; 35°41′09″N 97°00′17″W	Warwick	
45	Wolcott Building	Wolcott Building	April 5, 1984 (#84003136)	725 Manvel Ave. 35°42′09″N 96°52′31″W	Chandler	
46	ZCBJ Lodge No. 46	ZCBJ Lodge No. 46	March 8, 1984 (#84003138)	S. Barta Ave. 35°28′39″N 96°41′01″W	Prague	

== Former listing ==
	Name on the Register	Image	Date listed	Date removed	Location	City or town	Description
1	Bank of Agra		February 21, 1990 (#90000122)	September 6, 2006	400 Grant Avenue	Agra	Demolished in 1999

== See also ==
- List of National Historic Landmarks in Oklahoma
- National Register of Historic Places listings in Oklahoma
