= Lincoln County, Oklahoma =

County in Oklahoma, United States

- County
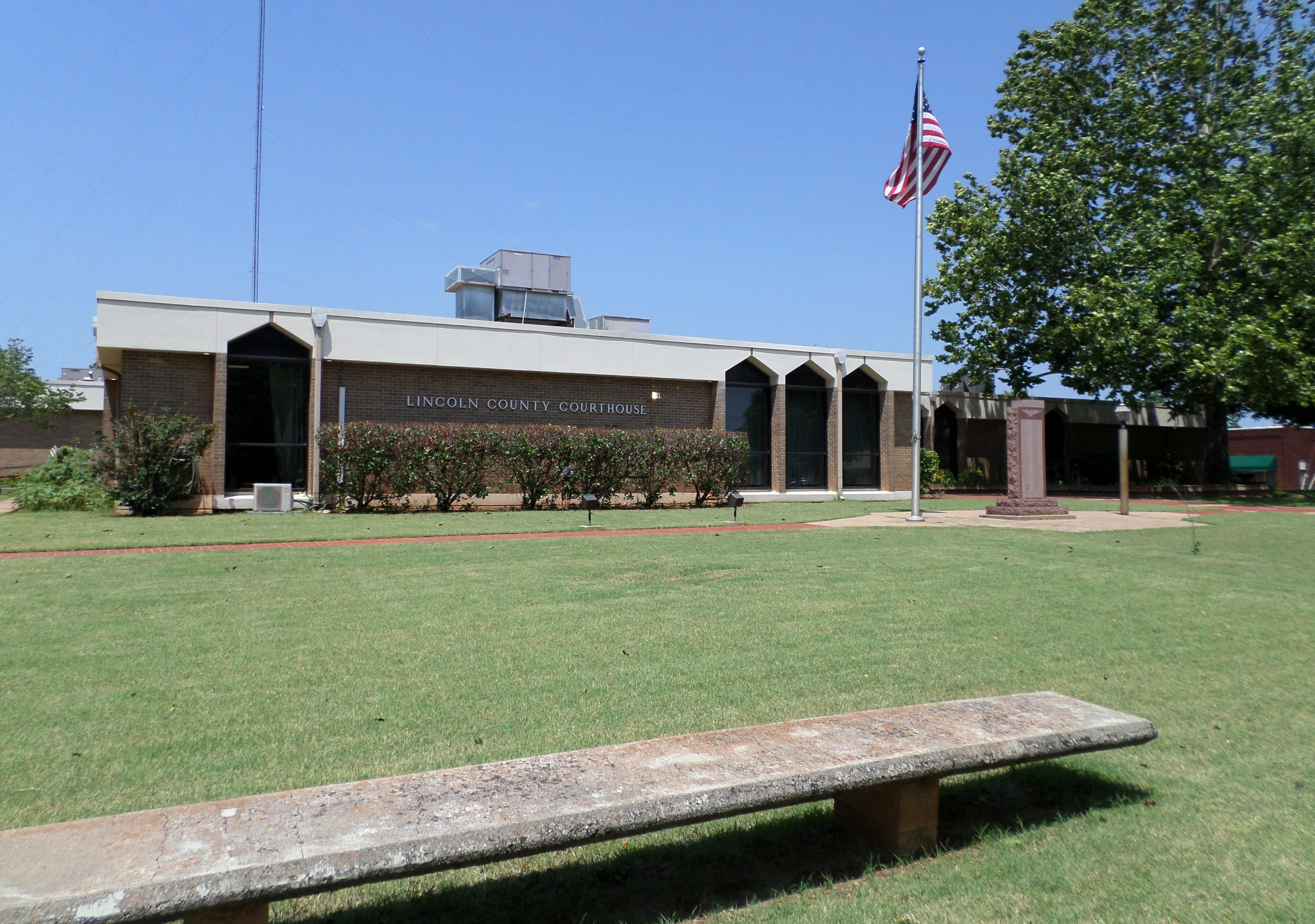
- Lincoln County Courthouse

- Location within the U.S. state of Oklahoma
- Coordinates: 35°42′N 96°53′W
- Country: United States
- State: Oklahoma
- Founded: 1891
- Named for: Abraham Lincoln
- Seat: Chandler
- Largest city: Chandler

Area
  - Total: 966 sq mi (2,500 km^{2})
  - Land: 952 sq mi (2,470 km^{2})
  - Water: 13 sq mi (34 km^{2}) 1.4%

Population (2020)
  - Total: 33,458
  - Estimate (2025): 35,278 ▲
  - Density: 35/sq mi (14/km^{2})
- Time zone: UTC−6 (Central)
  - Summer (DST): UTC−5 (CDT)
- Congressional district: 3rd
- Website: lincolncountyok.org

Lincoln County is a county in eastern Central Oklahoma, United States. As of the 2020 census, the population was 33,458. Its county seat is Chandler. Lincoln County is part of the Oklahoma City metropolitan area. In 2010, the center of population of Oklahoma was in Lincoln County, near the town of Sparks.

== History ==
The United States purchased the large tract of land known as the Louisiana Purchase from France in 1803. Washington Irving, Charles J. Latrobe, and Count Albert de Pourtalès accompanied Henry L. Ellsworth and others on an expedition in Indian Territory that may have passed through the far northwestern corner of the future Lincoln County.

The Osage hunted on land that includes present-day Lincoln County until they ceded the area in an 1825 treaty to the federal government. The government then assigned the land to the Creek and the Seminoles after they were removed from the southeastern United States. Following Quapaw removal in 1834, several small groups of Quapaw dispersed throughout Indian Territory. There were absentee groups of Quapaw living along the Red River and in Creek, Choctaw and Cherokee territory. There is a "Quapaw Creek" in the southern half of Lincoln County which was a village site for one of these absentee groups of Quapaw. After the Civil War in 1866, the Creek and Seminoles were forced to give up lands that included present-day Lincoln County in Reconstruction Treaties for siding with the Confederacy.

The federal government then used the area to resettle the Sac and Fox, Potawatomi, Kickapoo and Ioway tribes. Established in 1870, the Sac and Fox agency, established on the eastern edge of the present-day county, was the first settlement in the area.

In 1890, the Jerome Commission negotiated with the tribes of the area such that they agreed to allotment of their reservation lands, except for the Kickapoo. Indian lands were allotted to individual tribal members and the excess were opened to white settlement in the Land Run of 1891. A separate land run was held later that year for the townsite of the predesignated county seat, Chandler. Lincoln County was organized and designated as County A. In 1895, the Kickapoo agreed to allotment and the land was claimed by settlers during the Land Run of 1895.

The voters chose the name Lincoln County for County A in honor of President Abraham Lincoln, selecting it over the names Sac, Fox, and Springer.

== Geography ==
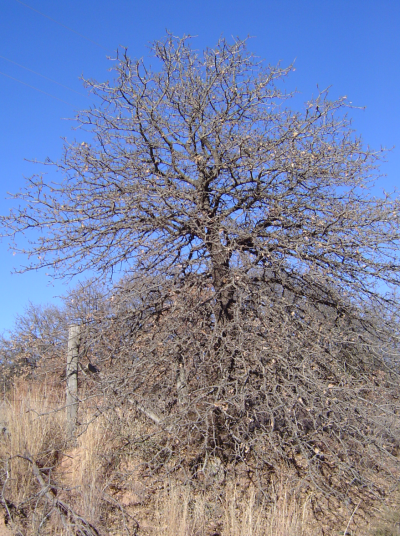
Midwinter in the cross timbers of western Lincoln County. Native blackjack and little bluestem.

According to the U.S. Census Bureau, the county has an area of 966 square miles (2,500 km^{2}), of which 952 square miles (2,470 km^{2}) is land and 13 square miles (34 km^{2}) (1.4%) is water. The county is drained by the Deep Fork of the Canadian River. The eastern part of the county lies in the Cross Timbers and the Sandstone Hills, while the western part is in the Red Bed Plains.

=== Major highways ===
- Interstate 44 / Turner Turnpike
- U.S. Highway 62
- U.S. Highway 177
- U.S. Highway 377
- State Highway 18
- State Highway 66
- State Highway 99
- State Highway 102
- State Highway 105

=== Adjacent counties ===
- Payne County (north)
- Creek County (northeast)
- Okfuskee County (southeast)
- Pottawatomie County (south)
- Oklahoma County (southwest)
- Logan County (northwest)

== Demographics ==
Historical population
| Census | Pop. | Note | %± |
|---|---|---|---|
| 1900 | 27,007 | | — |
| 1910 | 34,779 | | 28.8% |
| 1920 | 33,406 | | −3.9% |
| 1930 | 33,738 | | 1.0% |
| 1940 | 29,529 | | −12.5% |
| 1950 | 22,102 | | −25.2% |
| 1960 | 18,783 | | −15.0% |
| 1970 | 19,482 | | 3.7% |
| 1980 | 26,601 | | 36.5% |
| 1990 | 29,216 | | 9.8% |
| 2000 | 32,080 | | 9.8% |
| 2010 | 34,273 | | 6.8% |
| 2020 | 33,458 | | −2.4% |
| 2025 (est.) | 35,278 | ▲ | 5.4% |
U.S. Decennial Census; 1790-1960 1900-1990; 1990-2000 2010

=== 2020 census ===
As of the 2020 census, the county had a population of 33,458. Of the residents, 24.0% were under the age of 18 and 19.1% were 65 years of age or older; the median age was 41.6 years. For every 100 females there were 99.5 males, and for every 100 females age 18 and over there were 97.4 males.

The racial makeup of the county was 79.3% White, 1.8% Black or African American, 7.1% American Indian and Alaska Native, 0.4% Asian, 1.1% from some other race, and 10.3% from two or more races. Hispanic or Latino residents of any race comprised 3.4% of the population.

There were 12,954 households in the county, of which 31.6% had children under the age of 18 living with them and 22.7% had a female householder with no spouse or partner present. About 25.1% of all households were made up of individuals and 12.3% had someone living alone who was 65 years of age or older.

There were 14,456 housing units, of which 10.4% were vacant. Among occupied housing units, 77.8% were owner-occupied and 22.2% were renter-occupied. The homeowner vacancy rate was 1.5% and the rental vacancy rate was 9.7%.

=== 2000 census ===
As of the 2000 census, 32,080 people, 12,178 households, and 9,121 families resided in the county. The population density was 34 inhabitants per square mile (13/km^{2}). There were 13,712 housing units at an average density of 14 units per square mile (5.4/km^{2}). The county's racial makeup was 86.43% White, 2.46% Black or African American, 6.57% Native American, 0.25% Asian, 0.02% Pacific Islander, 0.45% from other races, and 3.82% from two or more races. 1.51% of the population were Hispanic or Latino of any race.

There were 12,178 households, out of which 34.10% had children under the age of 18 living with them, 61.50% were married couples living together, 9.20% had a female householder with no husband present, and 25.10% were non-families. 22.40% of all households were made up of individuals, and 10.50% had someone living alone who was 65 years of age or older. The average household size was 2.59 and the average family size was 3.03.

In the county, the population was spread out, with 27.40% under the age of 18, 7.80% from 18 to 24, 26.70% from 25 to 44, 24.10% from 45 to 64, and 13.90% who were 65 years of age or older. The median age was 38 years. For every 100 females, there were 97.30 males. For every 100 females age 18 and over, there were 94.50 males.

The county's median household income was $31,187, and the median family income was $36,310. Males had a median income of $28,647 versus $20,099 for females. The county's per capita income was $14,890. About 11.10% of families and 14.50% of the population were below the poverty line, including 17.90% of those under age 18 and 12.10% of those age 65 or over.

== Government and politics ==
Voter Registration and Party Enrollment as of June 30, 2023
| Party | Number of Voters | Percentage |
|---|---|---|
| Democratic | 4,241 | 20.82% |
| Republican | 13,058 | 64.11% |
| Unaffiliated | 3,068 | 15.06% |
| Total | 20,367 | 100% |

United States presidential election results for Lincoln County, Oklahoma
| Year | Republican | | Democratic | | Third party(ies) | |
| Year | No. | % | No. | % | No. | % |
|---|---|---|---|---|---|---|
| 1908 | 3,503 | 49.44% | 3,030 | 42.76% | 553 | 7.80% |
| 1912 | 2,459 | 44.19% | 2,137 | 38.40% | 969 | 17.41% |
| 1916 | 2,387 | 41.69% | 2,258 | 39.43% | 1,081 | 18.88% |
| 1920 | 5,261 | 59.24% | 2,980 | 33.55% | 640 | 7.21% |
| 1924 | 4,220 | 51.20% | 3,283 | 39.83% | 739 | 8.97% |
| 1928 | 6,118 | 70.74% | 2,405 | 27.81% | 126 | 1.46% |
| 1932 | 3,505 | 31.45% | 7,641 | 68.55% | 0 | 0.00% |
| 1936 | 5,452 | 47.80% | 5,903 | 51.75% | 52 | 0.46% |
| 1940 | 6,269 | 54.16% | 5,271 | 45.54% | 34 | 0.29% |
| 1944 | 4,801 | 54.94% | 3,910 | 44.74% | 28 | 0.32% |
| 1948 | 3,898 | 44.24% | 4,913 | 55.76% | 0 | 0.00% |
| 1952 | 5,778 | 58.67% | 4,071 | 41.33% | 0 | 0.00% |
| 1956 | 4,993 | 56.09% | 3,909 | 43.91% | 0 | 0.00% |
| 1960 | 5,528 | 62.94% | 3,255 | 37.06% | 0 | 0.00% |
| 1964 | 3,854 | 43.30% | 5,046 | 56.70% | 0 | 0.00% |
| 1968 | 3,855 | 47.43% | 2,304 | 28.35% | 1,969 | 24.22% |
| 1972 | 6,512 | 74.98% | 1,919 | 22.10% | 254 | 2.92% |
| 1976 | 4,429 | 46.38% | 4,988 | 52.23% | 133 | 1.39% |
| 1980 | 6,064 | 63.27% | 3,231 | 33.71% | 290 | 3.03% |
| 1984 | 8,088 | 72.29% | 3,020 | 26.99% | 81 | 0.72% |
| 1988 | 6,409 | 59.67% | 4,225 | 39.34% | 106 | 0.99% |
| 1992 | 5,315 | 42.78% | 3,904 | 31.43% | 3,204 | 25.79% |
| 1996 | 5,243 | 47.14% | 4,332 | 38.95% | 1,547 | 13.91% |
| 2000 | 7,387 | 63.13% | 4,140 | 35.38% | 174 | 1.49% |
| 2004 | 10,149 | 71.52% | 4,041 | 28.48% | 0 | 0.00% |
| 2008 | 10,470 | 74.92% | 3,504 | 25.08% | 0 | 0.00% |
| 2012 | 9,553 | 74.48% | 3,273 | 25.52% | 0 | 0.00% |
| 2016 | 10,854 | 77.39% | 2,430 | 17.33% | 741 | 5.28% |
| 2020 | 12,013 | 80.69% | 2,609 | 17.52% | 266 | 1.79% |
| 2024 | 12,495 | 80.80% | 2,712 | 17.54% | 258 | 1.67% |

=== United States Congress ===
| Senators | Name | Party | First Elected | Level |
|---|---|---|---|---|
| Senate Class 1 | Markwayne Mullin | Republican | 2022 | Junior Senator |
| Senate Class 2 | James Lankford | Republican | 2014 | Senior Senator |
| Representatives | Name | Party | First Elected | |
| District 3 | Frank Lucas | Republican | 1994 | |

==== Oklahoma Senate ====
| District | Name | Party | First Elected | Hometown |
|---|---|---|---|---|
| 28 | Zack Taylor | Republican | 2020 | Seminole |

==== Oklahoma House of Representatives ====
| District | Name | Party | First Elected | Hometown |
|---|---|---|---|---|
| 32 | Kevin Wallace | Republican | 2014 | Wellston |

== Economy ==
The county economy has largely depended on agriculture. Cotton almost immediately became the dominant crop after white settlement. During the first decade of the twentieth century, Lincoln County was one of the top two counties producing cotton in Oklahoma. By the end of the Great Depression the economy had become more diversified. Oil furnished one-third of county tax revenue, and cattle raising and pecan growing became important income sources. By the turn of the 21st Century, the county economy had diversified and was based primarily on professional services, small businesses, and service industries.

== Communities ==
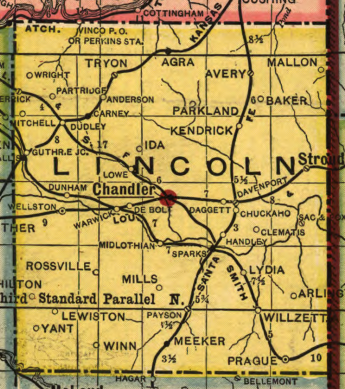
1905 map of Lincoln County showing locations of many of the old communities, post offices, and railroad stops which no longer exist.

=== Cities ===
- Chandler (County seat)
- Prague
- Stroud

=== Towns ===
- Agra
- Carney
- Davenport
- Fallis
- Kendrick
- Meeker
- Sparks
- Tryon
- Warwick
- Wellston

=== Unincorporated communities ===
- Arlington
- Jacktown
- Midlothian
- Parkland
- Payson
- Rossville
- Willzetta

=== Ghost town ===
- Avery

== Education ==
K-12 school districts include:

- Agra Independent School District
- Carney Public Schools
- Chandler Public Schools
- Cushing Public Schools
- Davenport Public Schools
- Harrah Public Schools
- Luther Public Schools
- McLoud Public Schools
- Meeker Public Schools
- Paden Public Schools
- Perkins-Tryon Public Schools
- Prague Public Schools
- Stroud Public Schools
- Wellston Public Schools

Elementary school districts include:

- Oak Grove Public School
- White Rock Public School

== Notable people ==
- Roy Harris (1898 - 1979), composer, born near Chandler;
- Carl Hubbell (1903 - 1988), U.S. major league baseball pitcher lived in Meeker;
- James Brooks Ayers Robertson (1871 - 1938), Oklahoma governor 1919–1923, lived and buried in Chandler;
- Jim Thorpe (1888 - 1953), American athlete, attended Sac and Fox agency school in Lincoln County.
- Roy J. Turner (1894 - 1973), Oklahoma governor 1947–1953, born in Kendrick.

== NRHP sites ==
The following sites in Lincoln County are listed on the National Register of Historic Places:

- Bon Ton House, Stroud
- Boston Store, Chandler
- Captain Creek Bridge, Wellston
- Joseph Carpenter House, Stroud
- Chandler Armory, Chandler
- Chandler Bookstore, Chandler
- Chandler High School, Chandler
- Clapp-Cunningham Building, Chandler
- Conklin House, Chandler
- Crane Motor Company Building, Chandler
- Crescent School, Meeker
- Davenport Broadway Avenue Brick Street, Davenport
- Fairview School, Meeker
- First Presbyterian Church of Chandler, Chandler
- Graham Hotel, Stroud
- Walter Hadley House, Stroud
- Hotel Lincoln, Stroud
- George Hughes House, Stroud
- Johnson House, Chandler
- Moses Keokuk House, Stroud
- Mascho Building and Public Privy, Chandler
- Meeker Town Hall, Meeker
- William Alfred Mensch Building, Stroud
- Midlothian School, Midlothian
- National Guard Statistical Building, Chandler
- Oleson-Crane Building, Chandler
- Ozark Trails Section of Route 66, Stroud
- Prague City Hall and Jail, Prague
- Rock Café, Stroud
- Seaba's Filling Station, Warwick
- Southwestern Bell Telephone Building, Stroud
- Spring Dell School, Meeker
- St. Cloud Hotel, Chandler
- St. Paul Baptist Church and Cemetery, Meeker
- St. Stephen's Episcopal Church, Chandler
- Old Stroud School, Stroud
- Stroud Trading Company Building, Stroud
- James W. Stroud House, Stroud
- Marshal William M. Tilghman Homestead, Chandler
- Warwick School, Warwick
- Wolcott Building, Chandler
- ZCBJ Lodge No. 46, Prague
