= Parkland, Oklahoma =

- Unincorporated community
- Location within Oklahoma Location within the United States
- Coordinates: 35°50′24″N 96°50′32″W
- Country: United States
- State: Oklahoma
- County: Lincoln
- Elevation: 965 ft (294 m)
- Time zone: UTC-6 (Central (CST))
  - Summer (DST): UTC-5 (CDT)
- Postal code: 74824
- Area codes: 539/918
- FIPS code: 40-00700
- GNIS feature ID: 1096445

Parkland is a small unincorporated community in northern Lincoln County, Oklahoma, United States. It is 4 miles (6 km) south of Agra, and 10 miles (16.9 km) north of Chandler . Its name was adopted "to describe the character of the townsite".

== History ==
The land where Parkland is located was opened to white settlement by the Land Run of 1891 on September 28 of that year. The Parkland Post Office was established some three years later, on December 19, 1894, with McShelly Fishback as the first postmaster. The Parkland Post Office was closed on June 15, 1918.

A tornado on May 30, 1897, demolished several houses of the town, killing two and wounding several.

Free lots in the town of Kendrick were offered to business owners in Parkland if they would move when Kendrick was platted in 1902.

The towns of Chandler and Stroud were nearby railroad points. The Parkland Telephone company was organized and built telephone lines from Chandler to Stroud, linking them with Parkland and Cushing. Later these lines were purchased by the Arkansas Valley Telephone Company.
