= Kendrick, Oklahoma =

- Town
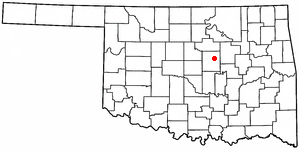
- Location of Kendrick, Oklahoma
- Coordinates: 35°47′07″N 96°46′32″W
- Country: United States
- State: Oklahoma
- County: Lincoln

Area
  - Total: 0.15 sq mi (0.38 km^{2})
  - Land: 0.15 sq mi (0.38 km^{2})
  - Water: 0 sq mi (0.00 km^{2})
- Elevation: 860 ft (260 m)

Population (2020)
  - Total: 87
  - Density: 593.8/sq mi (229.27/km^{2})
- Time zone: UTC-6 (Central (CST))
  - Summer (DST): UTC-5 (CDT)
- ZIP code: 74079
- Area codes: 539/918
- FIPS code: 40-39150
- GNIS feature ID: 2412824

Kendrick is a town in Lincoln County, Oklahoma, United States. As of the 2020 census, Kendrick had a population of 87.

== Geography ==
Kendrick is located in northeastern Lincoln County. It is 9 miles (14 km) northwest of Stroud, 11 miles (18 km) northeast of Chandler, the Lincoln county seat, and 55 miles (89 km) northeast of Oklahoma City.

According to the United States Census Bureau, the town has a total area of 0.15 square miles (0.39 km^{2}), all land.

Ranch Creek flows past the east side of the town, running south to Dry Creek and then to the Deep Fork, an eastward-flowing tributary of the North Canadian River.

== Demographics ==
Historical population
Census	Pop.	Note	%±
1920	255		—
1930	270		5.9%
1940	256		−5.2%
1950	172		−32.8%
1960	155		−9.9%
1970	126		−18.7%
1980	132		4.8%
1990	171		29.5%
2000	138		−19.3%
2010	139		0.7%
2020	87		−37.4%
U.S. Decennial Census

=== 2020 census ===
As of the 2020 census, Kendrick had a population of 87. The median age was 47.8 years. 24.1% of residents were under the age of 18 and 27.6% of residents were 65 years of age or older. For every 100 females there were 89.1 males, and for every 100 females age 18 and over there were 78.4 males age 18 and over.

0.0% of residents lived in urban areas, while 100.0% lived in rural areas.

There were 38 households in Kendrick, of which 36.8% had children under the age of 18 living in them. Of all households, 47.4% were married-couple households, 7.9% were households with a male householder and no spouse or partner present, and 34.2% were households with a female householder and no spouse or partner present. About 15.8% of all households were made up of individuals and 13.1% had someone living alone who was 65 years of age or older.

There were 45 housing units, of which 15.6% were vacant. The homeowner vacancy rate was 0.0% and the rental vacancy rate was 0.0%.

Racial composition as of the 2020 census
Race	Number	Percent
White	75	86.2%
Black or African American	1	1.1%
American Indian and Alaska Native	6	6.9%
Asian	0	0.0%
Native Hawaiian and Other Pacific Islander	0	0.0%
Some other race	0	0.0%
Two or more races	5	5.7%
Hispanic or Latino (of any race)	2	2.3%

=== 2000 census ===
At the 2000 census there were 138 people, 52 households, and 39 families living in the town. The population density was 965.4 inhabitants per square mile (372.7/km^{2}). There were 62 housing units at an average density of 433.7 per square mile (167.5/km^{2}). The racial makeup of the town was 78.26% White, 2.90% African American, 15.22% Native American, and 3.62% from two or more races. Hispanic or Latino of any race were 3.62%.

Of the 52 households, 28.8% had children under the age of 18 living with them, 59.6% were married couples living together, 13.5% had a female householder with no husband present, and 25.0% were non-families. 23.1% of households were one person and 5.8% were one person aged 65 or older. The average household size was 2.65 and the average family size was 3.15.

The age distribution was 26.1% under the age of 18, 10.9% from 18 to 24, 23.9% from 25 to 44, 28.3% from 45 to 64, and 10.9% 65 or older. The median age was 36 years. For every 100 females, there were 70.4 males. For every 100 females age 18 and over, there were 75.9 males.

The median household income was $21,000 and the median family income was $26,667. Males had a median income of $17,000 versus $13,750 for females. The per capita income for the town was $10,662. There were 14.7% of families and 21.0% of the population living below the poverty line, including 42.9% of under eighteens and none of those over 64.
