= Midlothian (disambiguation) =

Midlothian is a council area of Scotland. It is the successor to the shire of Midlothian (historic), formerly known as Edinburghshire.

Midlothian may also refer to:

- Midlothian (Scottish Parliament constituency)
- Midlothian (UK Parliament constituency)
- Midlothian, Illinois, US
  - Midlothian station, Metra commuter rail station serving the town
- Midlothian, Maryland, US
- Midlothian, Oklahoma, US
- Midlothian, Texas, US
- Midlothian, Virginia, US

Edinburghshire may also refer to:

- Edinburghshire (Parliament of Scotland constituency)
- Edinburghshire (UK Parliament constituency)
- Edinburghshire Constabulary (1975–2013), the Lothian and Borders Police for the Scottish councils of Edinburgh, Midlothian, and others.

== See also ==
- Heart of Midlothian (disambiguation)
