= Chandler High School (Oklahoma) =

Public high school in Oklahoma, United States

Coordinates: 35.7015°N 96.9016°W

Location
- 901 South CHS Street; Chandler, (Lincoln County), Oklahoma 74801; United States

Information
- Type: Public high school
- Principal: Geoff Metheny
- Staff: 22.70 (FTE)
- Enrollment: 350 (2023-2024)
- Student to teacher ratio: 15.42
- Colors: Red and blue
- Nickname: Lions

Chandler High School is a public high school serving 303 students in grades nine through 12 located in Chandler, Oklahoma. The sports team nickname is the Lions. Notable alumni include baseball player Jon Gray. The school's address is 901 South CHS Street, Chandler, OK 74834.

== School demographics ==
81% of the students are white, while 10% are Native American, 8% are black and less than 1% are Asian and Hispanic.
