= Flynt Building =

- U.S. National Register of Historic Places
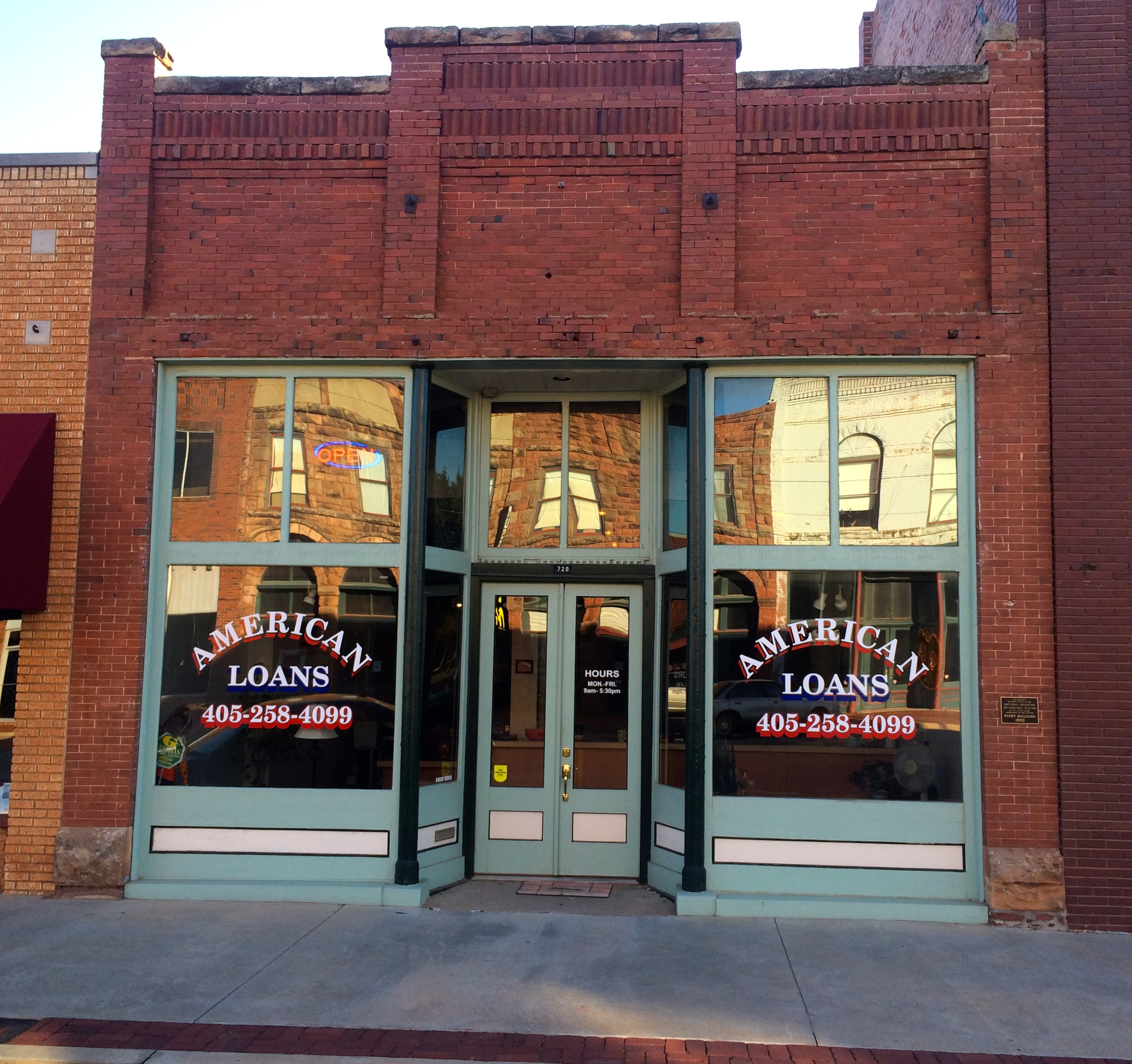
- The building in 2014

- Location within Oklahoma
- Location: 720 Manvel Avenue, Chandler, Oklahoma
- Coordinates: 35°42′10″N 96°52′48″W
- Area: less than one acre
- Built: 1902
- Architectural style: Early Commercial
- MPS: Territorial Commercial Buildings of Chandler TR
- NRHP reference No.: 07000516
- Added to NRHP: June 5, 2007

The Flynt Building is a historic building in Chandler, Oklahoma. It was built in 1902 for William A. Flynt and his wife Laura, who rented it as a grocery store. It was purchased by C.O. Cardwell and F. Murphy in 1906, and it became a hardware store. It has been listed on the National Register of Historic Places since June 5, 2007.
