= Narcissa D-X Gas Station =

- U.S. National Register of Historic Places
- Location within Oklahoma
- Nearest city: Miami, Oklahoma
- Coordinates: 36°48′03″N 94°55′36″W
- Area: less than one acre
- Built: 1934
- Built by: Gaines Brothers Construction Co.
- Architectural style: Bungalow/craftsman, Quonset hut
- MPS: Route 66 in Oklahoma MPS
- NRHP reference No.: 03001240
- Added to NRHP: December 5, 2003

The Narcissa D-X Gas Station, on 15050 S. Highway 69 in Ottawa County, Oklahoma, United States, near Miami, Oklahoma, was built in 1934 for the D-X Oil Company. It was listed on the National Register of Historic Places in 2003.

It was located on the last section of U.S. Route 66 in Oklahoma to be paved, in 1937.

When listed it was "the main building in the once thriving village of Narcissa, located south of Miami in Ottawa County on Route 66."

== See also ==
- Seaba's Filling Station: D-X station on Route 66 in Chandler, Oklahoma
