= Boston Store (Chandler, Oklahoma) =

- U.S. National Register of Historic Places
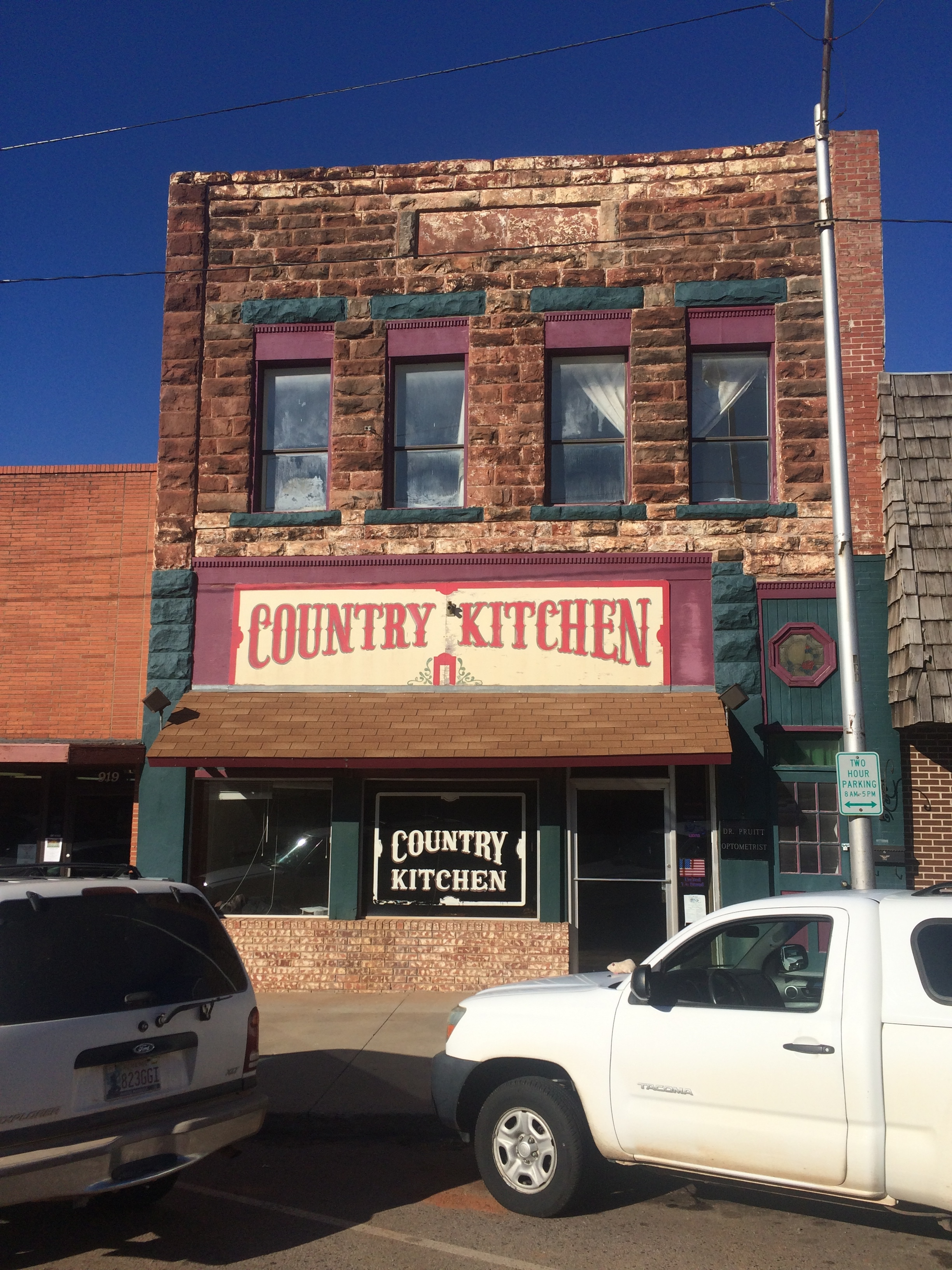
- The building in 2014

- Location within Oklahoma
- Location: 917 Manvel Avenue, Chandler, Oklahoma
- Coordinates: 35°42′03″N 96°52′31″W
- Area: less than one acre
- Built: 1900
- MPS: Territorial Commercial Buildings of Chandler TR
- NRHP reference No.: 84003107
- Added to NRHP: April 5, 1984

The Boston Store is a historic two-story building in Chandler, Oklahoma. It was built in 1900 with rusticated sandstone. Over the years, it housed a jewelry store, an insurance brokerage firm, a tailor's, a billiards area, a drugstore, and later a restaurant. It has been listed on the National Register of Historic Places since April 5, 1984.
