= Heart of Midlothian =

Heart of Midlothian may refer to:

- Old Tolbooth, Edinburgh, a structure known as the "Heart of Midlothian"
  - Heart of Midlothian (Royal Mile), a mosaic heart in the pavement of Edinburgh's Royal Mile at the former site of the Old Tolbooth
- The Heart of Midlothian, an 1818 novel by Sir Walter Scott, the title referring to the Old Tolbooth
  - The Heart of Midlothian (film), a 1914 British silent film adaptation of Scott's novel
  - A Woman's Triumph, a 1914 American silent film adaptation of Scott's novel
- Heart of Midlothian F.C., an Edinburgh association football club
  - Heart of Midlothian F.C. Under-20s and Academy, an associated youth team and system
  - Heart of Midlothian W.F.C., an associated women's football club

== See also ==
- "Heart of Lothian", a song by British rock band Marillion
- Midlothian (disambiguation)
