= St. Stephen's Episcopal Church (Chandler, Oklahoma) =

Historic church in Oklahoma, United States

- U.S. National Register of Historic Places
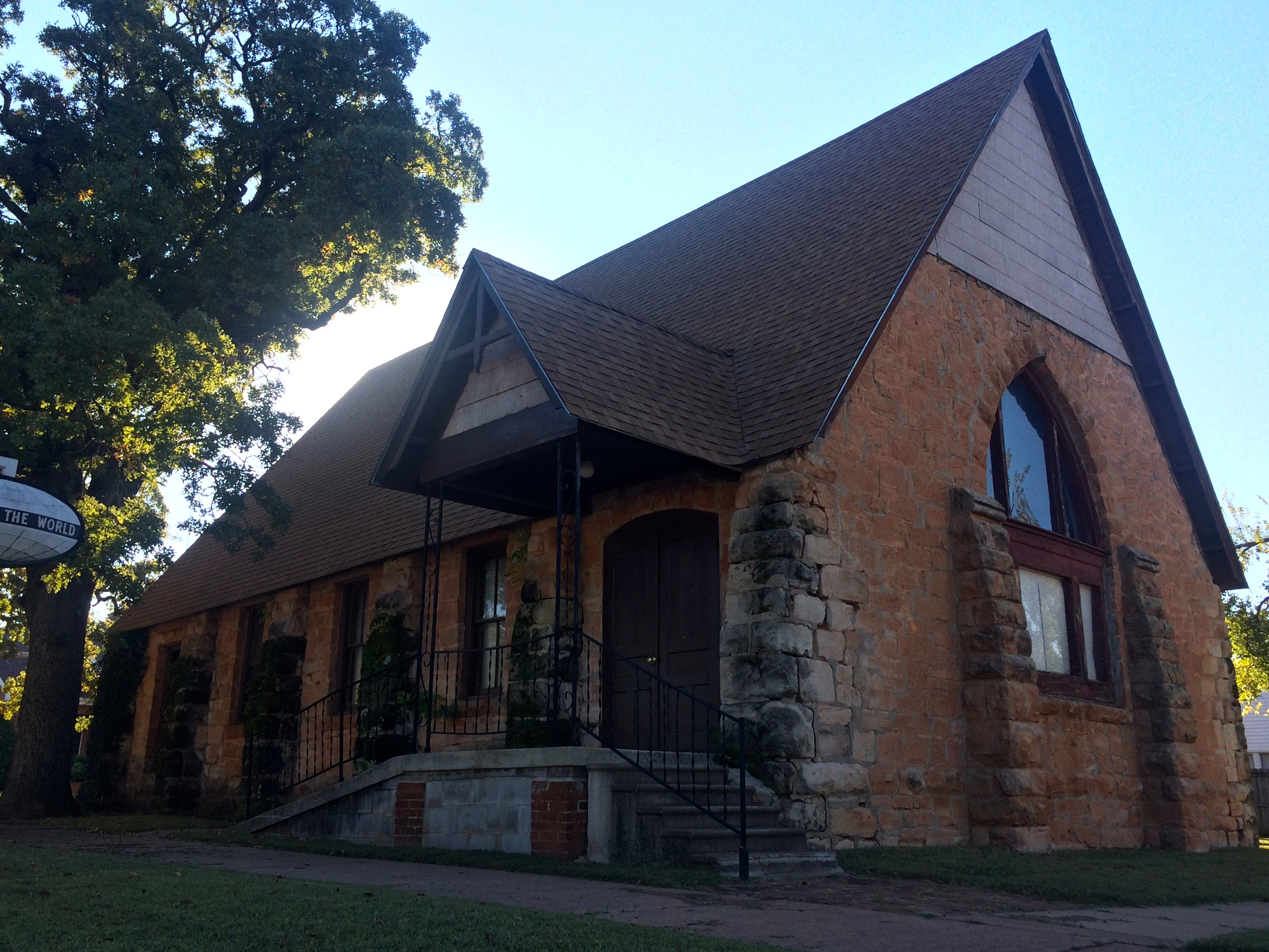

- Location within Oklahoma Location within the United States
- Location: 812 Blaine Ave., Chandler, Oklahoma
- Coordinates: 35°42′8″N 96°52′57″W
- Area: less than one acre
- Built: 1899
- Architectural style: Late Gothic Revival
- NRHP reference No.: 00000655
- Added to NRHP: June 9, 2000

The St. Stephen's Episcopal Church at 812 Blaine Avenue in Chandler, Oklahoma (also known as Chandler Seventh-Day Adventist Church) is a historic church building. It was built in 1899 and added to the National Register of Historic Places in 2000. The church was formerly part of the Episcopal Diocese of Oklahoma.

It was deemed significant as "the best example of a small, stone Gothic Revival church building in Lincoln County, Oklahoma.

It is located in a residential neighborhood, across from the Carpenter Gothic First Presbyterian Church of Chandler, which was built in 1897 and is also National Register-listed. The Presbyterian church was one of few buildings in Chandler that survived a tornado on March 30, 1897.

Its National Register nomination in 2000 noted that "St. Stephen's remains in use today because, unlike most church buildings of its size, it has not become obsolete due to either a dwindling or burgeoning congregation, or become obsolete because it became too small for its congregation. The church was owned by the Protestant Episcopal Cathedral until 1946, when it was bought by the Society of Friends. In 1959, ownership changed to the Oklahoma Conference Corporation of the Seventh-Day Adventists."
