= Davenport, Oklahoma =

- Town
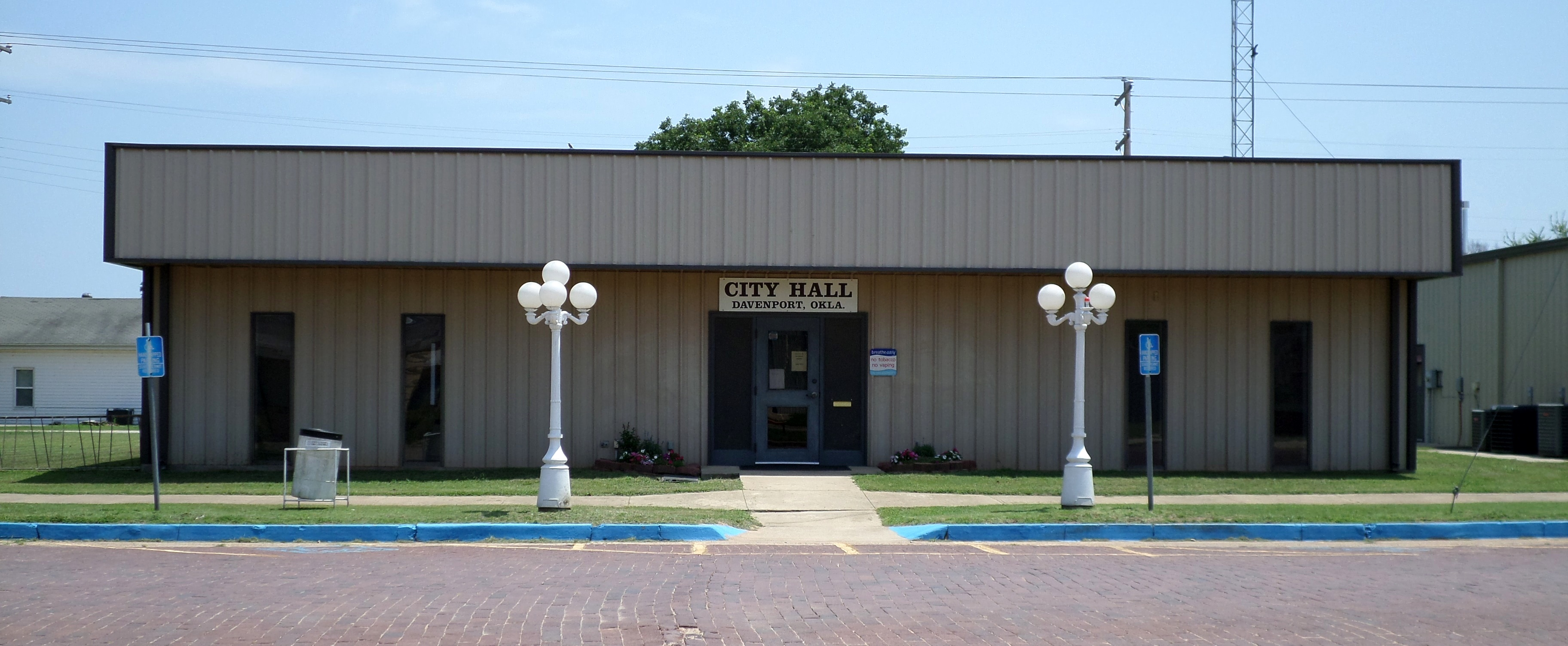
- Davenport City Hall

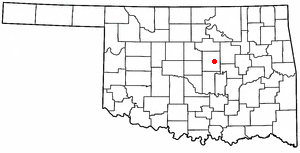
- Location of Davenport, Oklahoma
- Coordinates: 35°42′34″N 96°45′52″W
- Country: United States
- State: Oklahoma
- County: Lincoln

Area
  - Total: 1.06 sq mi (2.74 km^{2})
  - Land: 1.04 sq mi (2.70 km^{2})
  - Water: 0.012 sq mi (0.03 km^{2})
- Elevation: 846 ft (258 m)

Population (2020)
  - Total: 809
  - Density: 775.9/sq mi (299.59/km^{2})
- Time zone: UTC-6 (Central (CST))
  - Summer (DST): UTC-5 (CDT)
- ZIP code: 74026
- Area codes: 539/918
- FIPS code: 40-19350
- GNIS feature ID: 2412407
- Website: davenportok.gov

Davenport is a town in Lincoln County, Oklahoma, United States. As of the 2020 census, the town had a population of 809.

== History ==
A post office was established March 29, 1892 after the Sac and Fox land run of 1891. However, when a rail line built by the St. Louis and Oklahoma City Railroad was crossed by the line of the Eastern Oklahoma Railway in 1901, the town coalesced around that intersection, and was formally incorporated in 1906. Roads were not neglected; the town managed to get the Ozark Trail Highway through the location in 1916, and this road became the path of U.S. Route 66 through town in 1926.

Originally an agricultural center, the town was boosted by nearby oil production in the 1920s, and had six oil companies and three cotton gins in the 1930s. In the 21st Century, the town is mostly a bedroom community, with the overwhelming majority of residents commuting to work elsewhere. The locale nevertheless has multiple murals of its early history and Route 66 around town. Davenport Broadway Avenue Brick Street is on the National Register of Historic Places listings in Lincoln County, Oklahoma.

== Geography ==
According to the United States Census Bureau, the town has a total area of 0.8 square miles (2.1 km^{2}), all land.

== Demographics ==
Historical population
Census	Pop.	Note	%±
1910	394		—
1920	440		11.7%
1930	1,072		143.6%
1940	975		−9.0%
1950	841		−13.7%
1960	813		−3.3%
1970	831		2.2%
1980	974		17.2%
1990	979		0.5%
2000	881		−10.0%
2010	814		−7.6%
2020	809		−0.6%
U.S. Decennial Census

=== 2020 census ===
As of the 2020 census, Davenport had a population of 809. The median age was 36.0 years. 26.7% of residents were under the age of 18 and 15.1% of residents were 65 years of age or older. For every 100 females there were 106.4 males, and for every 100 females age 18 and over there were 94.4 males age 18 and over.

0.0% of residents lived in urban areas, while 100.0% lived in rural areas.

There were 312 households in Davenport, of which 39.1% had children under the age of 18 living in them. Of all households, 44.9% were married-couple households, 24.0% were households with a male householder and no spouse or partner present, and 24.4% were households with a female householder and no spouse or partner present. About 27.2% of all households were made up of individuals and 11.5% had someone living alone who was 65 years of age or older.

There were 345 housing units, of which 9.6% were vacant. The homeowner vacancy rate was 1.3% and the rental vacancy rate was 3.7%.

Racial composition as of the 2020 census
Race	Number	Percent
White	622	76.9%
Black or African American	15	1.9%
American Indian and Alaska Native	41	5.1%
Asian	0	0.0%
Native Hawaiian and Other Pacific Islander	0	0.0%
Some other race	20	2.5%
Two or more races	111	13.7%
Hispanic or Latino (of any race)	54	6.7%

=== 2000 census ===
At the 2000 census there were 881 people, 353 households, and 261 families living in the town. The population density was 1,082.2 inhabitants per square mile (417.8/km^{2}). There were 401 housing units at an average density of 492.6 per square mile (190.2/km^{2}). The racial makeup of the town was 85.24% White, 3.41% African American, 6.81% Native American, 0.11% Pacific Islander, 0.57% from other races, and 3.86% from two or more races. Hispanic or Latino of any race were 1.36%.

Of the 353 households 33.4% had children under the age of 18 living with them, 58.4% were married couples living together, 10.2% had a female householder with no husband present, and 25.8% were non-families. 22.7% of households were one person and 10.8% were one person aged 65 or older. The average household size was 2.50 and the average family size was 2.91.

The age distribution was 27.7% under the age of 18, 9.3% from 18 to 24, 27.9% from 25 to 44, 18.4% from 45 to 64, and 16.7% 65 or older. The median age was 34 years. For every 100 females, there were 89.9 males. For every 100 females age 18 and over, there were 85.2 males.

The median household income was $24,205 and the median family income was $30,329. Males had a median income of $25,972 versus $19,091 for females. The per capita income for the town was $12,438. About 19.5% of families and 23.9% of the population were below the poverty line, including 34.6% of those under age 18 and 13.5% of those age 65 or over.
