= Deep Fork River =

River in Oklahoma, United States

Coordinates: 35°21′34″N 95°36′39″W

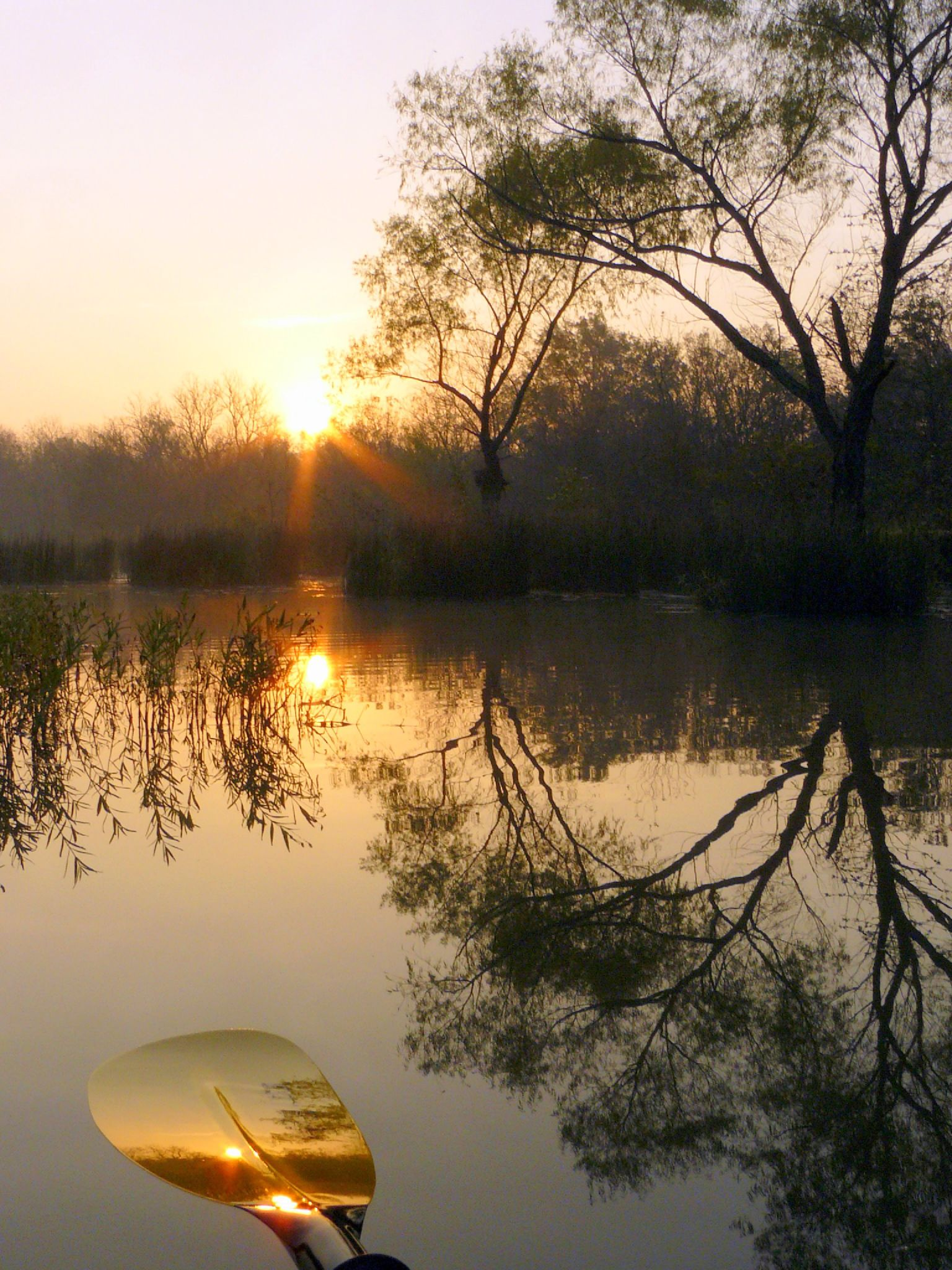
Kayaking in the Deep Fork National Wildlife Refuge.

The Deep Fork River (Deep Fork of the North Canadian) is an Oklahoma tributary of the North Canadian River. The headwaters flow from northern Oklahoma City and the river empties into the North Canadian River, now impounded by Lake Eufaula.

== Course and characteristics ==
The Deep Fork begins in and around northern Oklahoma City and flows eastward through Oklahoma County where five miles of the river is impounded by Arcadia Lake. Below the lake the river crosses into Lincoln County, winds back and forth across the Creek–Okfuskee county lines, crosses into Okmulgee County, meanders through the 9,600-acre (39 km^{2}) Deep Fork National Wildlife Refuge near the city of Okmulgee, and empties into Eufaula Lake near the Okmulgee–McIntosh County line. Communities along the waterway include Arcadia, Luther, Wellston, Warwick, Sparks, and Welty.

The Deep Fork has a total length of 370 kilometres (230 mi) and has a long narrow drainage basin averaging 40 kilometres (25 mi) in width. The Deep Fork flows through a region of red sandstone hills and red soils and the river is of the same color. The river is channelized in its upper course. The Deep Fork runs in a narrow channel, about 100 ft (30 m) wide at normal flow, frequently obstructed by fallen trees, and often enclosed by steep red clay banks as high as 100 ft (30 m). The river is prone to flooding, especially in its lower course where it is bordered by an extensive area of wetlands, temporary and oxbow lakes, and a deciduous bottom land forest, some of which is included in the Deep Fork NWR. The upper courses of the river are usually bordered by a narrow band of forest.

The Deep Fork is popular for fishing, especially for large flathead catfish. Water quality is considered fair in most of the river. Kayaking and canoeing are also popular. The National Wildlife Refuge has walking trails and blinds for wildlife observation and features a large number of waterfowl and other birds, both migratory and permanent.

== Tributaries ==
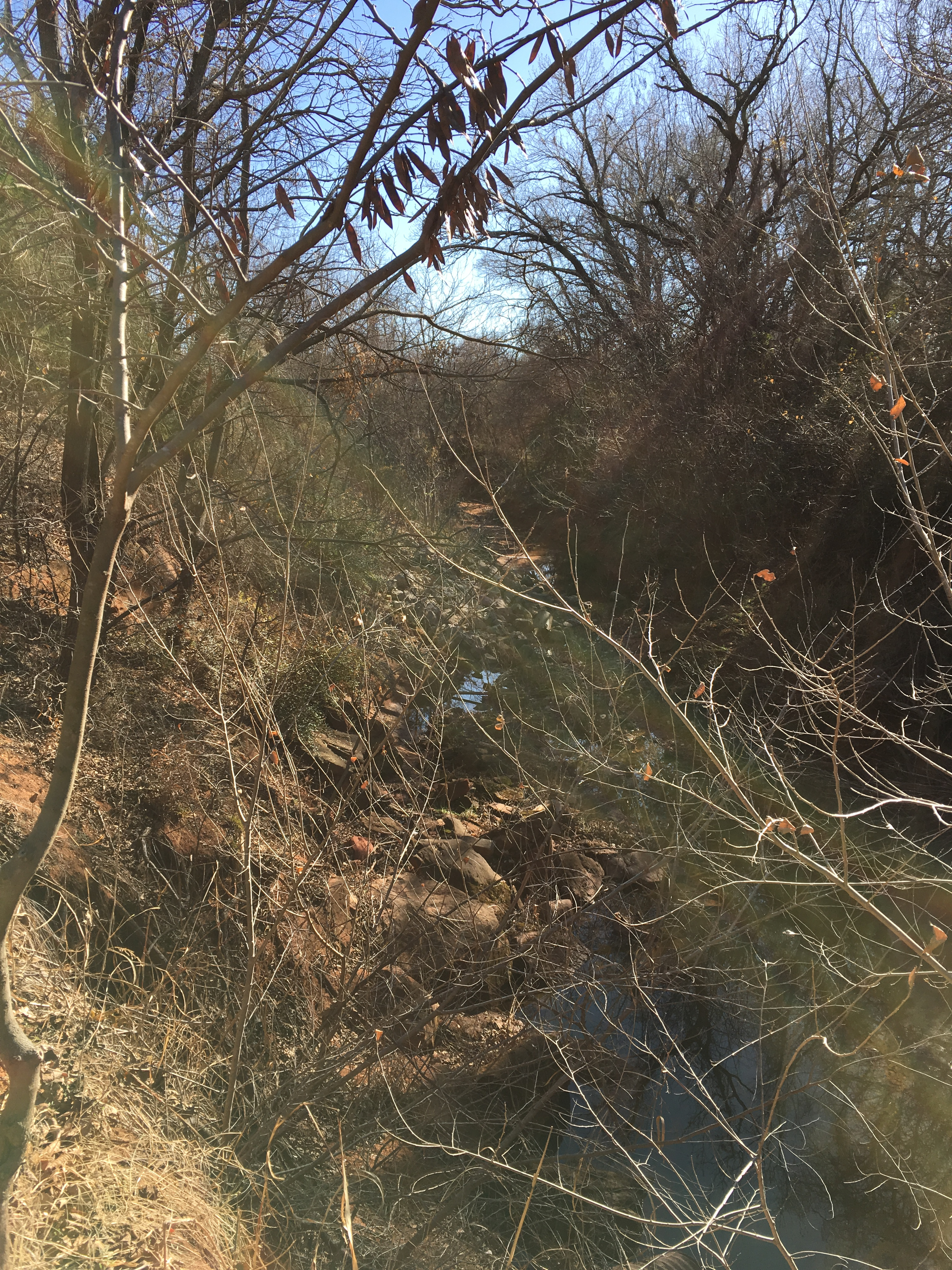
Spring Creek, Deep Fork Tributary, Edmond, OK

Spring Creek is a Deep Fork tributary that begins south of downtown Edmond, Oklahoma, just south of Edmond Memorial High School, and runs easterly. It flows into Arcadia Lake at Spring Creek Park. The western portion of the creek's watershed is heavily populated and the name is applied to many retail and residential developments in south Edmond. Spring Creek Trail was approved in 2015 for construction to run along the creek about 3 miles from Interstate 35 east to Spring Creek Park. The trail was completed in 2017.

== Discharge ==
The Deep Fork has a mean annual discharge of 1,338 cubic feet per second (37.9 cubic metres per second)

== History ==
During its Indian Territory days, the Deep Fork divided the Iowa and Kickapoo reserves of present-day Lincoln County. Also, the Deep Fork District of the Creek (Muscogee) Nation lay on the east side of the Creek reserve between the Deep Fork and the Canadian River. The area of the old district is mostly within today's Okfuskee County.

In the 1880s, the Deep Fork bottom west of Christian Wells' trading post (present-day Wellston) became a center of Boomer activity. Soldiers from Fort Reno constantly patrolled the area after Wells hired several of David Payne's lieutenants to work at his store. The troopers rounded up Boomers on a number of occasions and returned them to Kansas.

The river is the subject of the song "Deep Fork River Blues," written and performed by folk singer and songwriter Tom Paxton. Paxton lived in Bristow, Oklahoma, during his youth.

== Sources ==
- Kappler, Charles (Ed.). PART III.—EXECUTIVE ORDERS RELATING TO INDIAN RESERVES, (Indian Territory 840-844). Indian Affairs: Laws and Treaties. Washington: Government Printing Office, 1904. 1:840-844 (accessed August 28, 2006).
- United States Geological Survey. Source of Deep Fork River (accessed August 28, 2006).
- United States Geological Survey. Mouth of Deep Fork River (accessed August 28, 2006).
