= Midlothian, Oklahoma =

- Unincorporated community
- Location within Oklahoma Location within the United States
- Coordinates: 35°38′14″N 96°55′20″W
- Country: United States
- State: Oklahoma
- County: Lincoln
- Elevation: 853 ft (260 m)
- Time zone: UTC-6 (Central (CST))
  - Summer (DST): UTC-5 (CDT)
- GNIS feature ID: 1095372

Midlothian is an unincorporated community in Lincoln County, Oklahoma, United States. The post office was established in 1902 and the town plat filed in 1904. The post office closed in 1919 and the school was consolidated with the Chandler School District in the 1940s.

The area’s pioneers named Midlothian for Midlothian county in Scotland; they thought the green hills looked similar.

== Geography ==
Midlothian is southeast of Warwick and southwest of Chandler. This puts it approximately five miles south of Interstate 44, between U.S. Route 177 to the west and State Highway 18 to the east, on E 950 Rd.
