= Rossville, Oklahoma =

- Unincorporated community
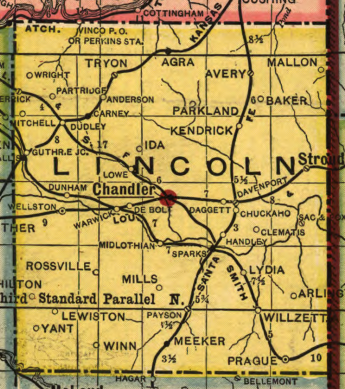
- 1905 map of Lincoln county showing the location of Rossville

- Location in Oklahoma Location in the United States
- Coordinates: 35°35′38″N 96°59′56″W
- Country: United States
- State: Oklahoma
- County: Lincoln
- Elevation: 1,030 ft (310 m)
- Time zone: UTC-6 (Central (CST))
  - Summer (DST): UTC-5 (CDT)
- GNIS feature ID: 1097469

Rossville is a community in Lincoln County, Oklahoma, United States, on US Highway 177. The community had a post office from October 7, 1895, until February 15, 1907. Per Oklahoma Place Names it was named for Ross Thomas, a local resident.

The community consists of a store, a church, and several residential dwellings. The Rossville School was one mile south of the community and the Rossville cemetery is one mile south and a half-mile west of the community. Many of the buildings (including the store) were relocated back from the right-of-way when US 177 was constructed during the 1960s.
