= Mascho Building and Public Privy =

- U.S. National Register of Historic Places
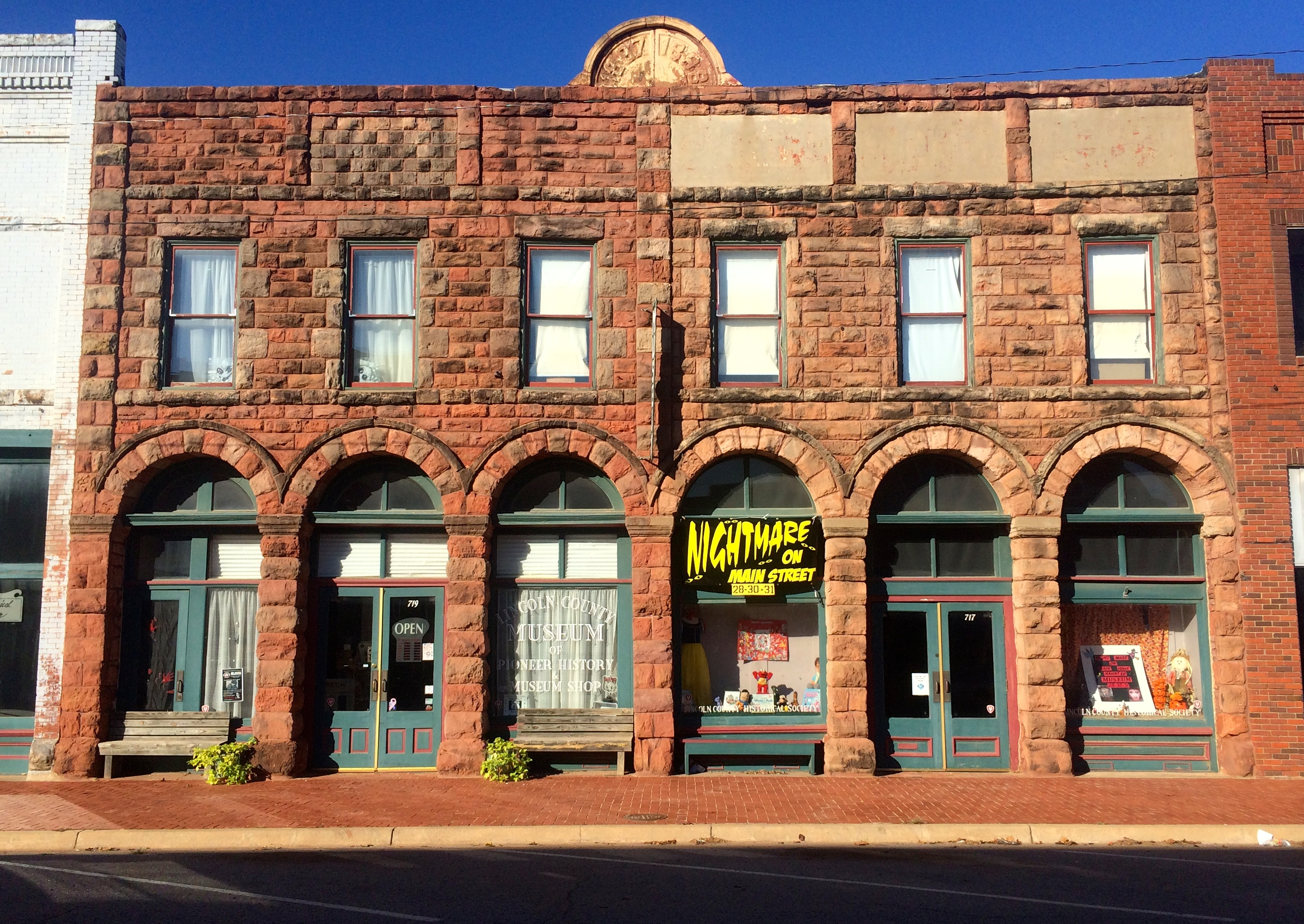
- The building in 2014

- Location within Oklahoma Location within the United States
- Location: 717-719 Manvel Avenue, Chandler, Oklahoma
- Coordinates: 35°42′11″N 96°52′31″W
- Area: less than one acre
- Built: 1897
- Architectural style: Richardsonian Romanesque
- MPS: Territorial Commercial Buildings of Chandler TR
- NRHP reference No.: 84003127
- Added to NRHP: April 5, 1984

The Mascho Building and Public Privy is a historic building in Chandler, Oklahoma. It was designed in the Richardsonian Romanesque style, and built in 1897 with rusticated sandstone. The first owner was A. E. Mascho, who used it as a grocery store until 1913, when it was purchased by grocer John Franklin Murphy and his wife Ella. The building has been listed on the National Register of Historic Places since April 5, 1984.
