= Joseph Carpenter House =

Historic house in Oklahoma, United States

- U.S. National Register of Historic Places
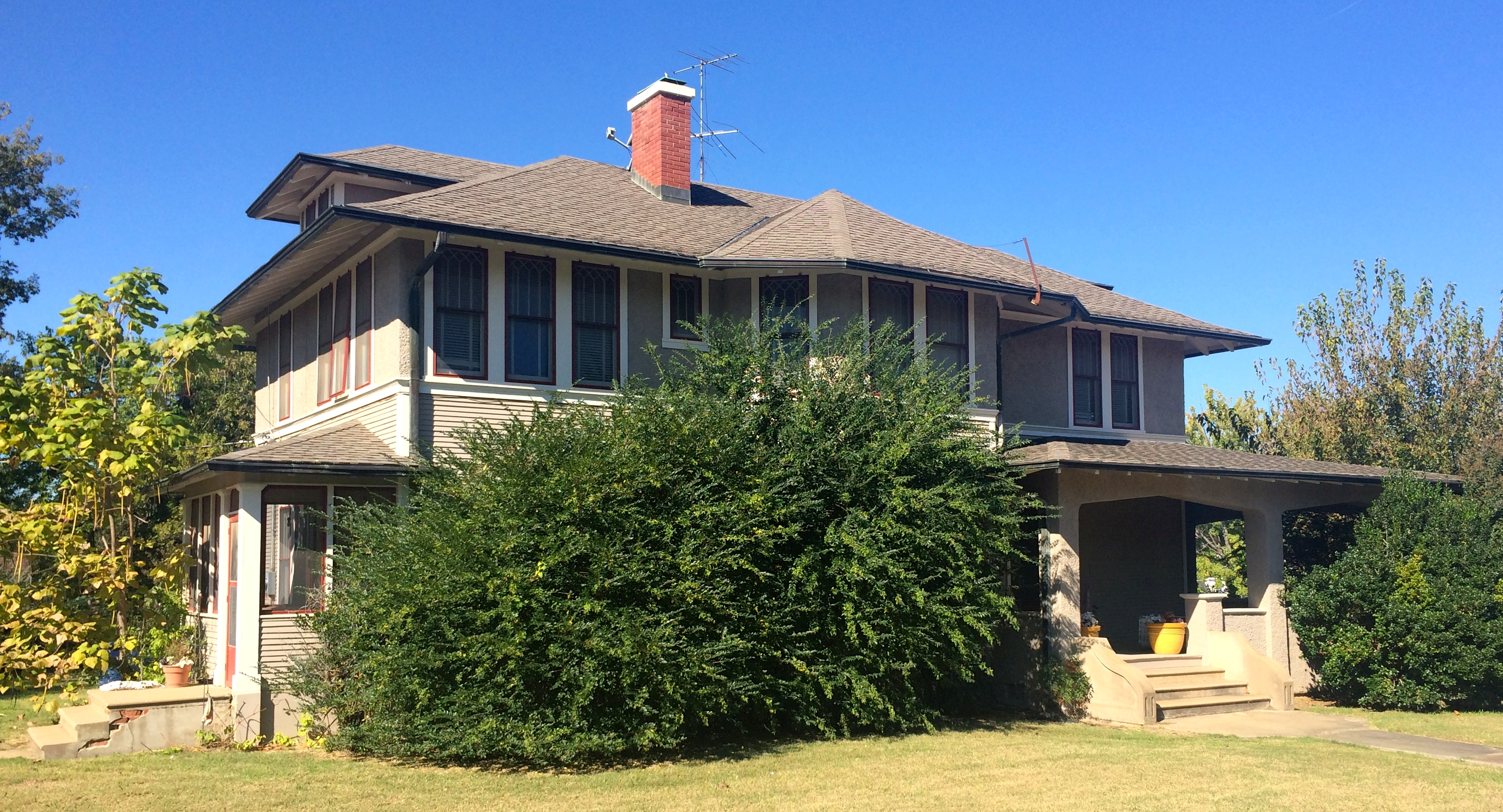

- Location within Oklahoma Location within the United States
- Location: 204 W. Sixth Street, Stroud, Oklahoma
- Coordinates: 35°45′6″N 96°39′19″W
- Area: less than one acre
- Built: 1913
- Architect: Carpenter, Joseph
- Architectural style: Prairie School
- NRHP reference No.: 86002346
- Added to NRHP: September 26, 1986

The Joseph Carpenter house is the oldest and best preserved Prairie Style house in Stroud, Lincoln County, Oklahoma. It was erected at 204 West 6th Street in 1913 as the residence of Joseph R. and Lovenia (Foushee) Carpenter.

== Description and history ==
A 2 1/2-story structure, it features a hipped roof with a combination of stucco and wood clapboard siding for the exterior walls. A single story hipped-roof porch runs across the front of the home. The building possesses a multitude of other prairie-style elements and retains a high degree of architectural integrity. It was listed in the National Register of Historic Places on September 26, 1986, as NR ID Number 86002346.

Joseph Carpenter was a successful businessman, accumulating considerable wealth as a merchant of farm implements and hardware, which made him financially able to hire an architect from Kansas City to design his new home. As one of the largest homes in Stroud, it reflected Carpenter's importance as a commercial leader in the city. A factor in the house retaining its architectural integrity is the care given it by Joseph's son and daughter-in-law Paul F. and Ruth (Riley) Carpenter, who resided in the home through 1986 when it was placed on the National Historic Register.
