= Agra Independent School District =

School district in Oklahoma

Location
- Agra, Oklahoma United States

District information
- Type: Public
- Superintendent: Jeff Kelly

Students and staff
- District mascot: Bearcat

Other information
- Website: www.agra.k12.ok.us

The Agra Independent School District is a school district based in Agra, Oklahoma (United States). It contains an elementary school, a middle school, and a high school.

== See also ==
List of school districts in Oklahoma.
