= Chandler Bookstore =

- U.S. National Register of Historic Places
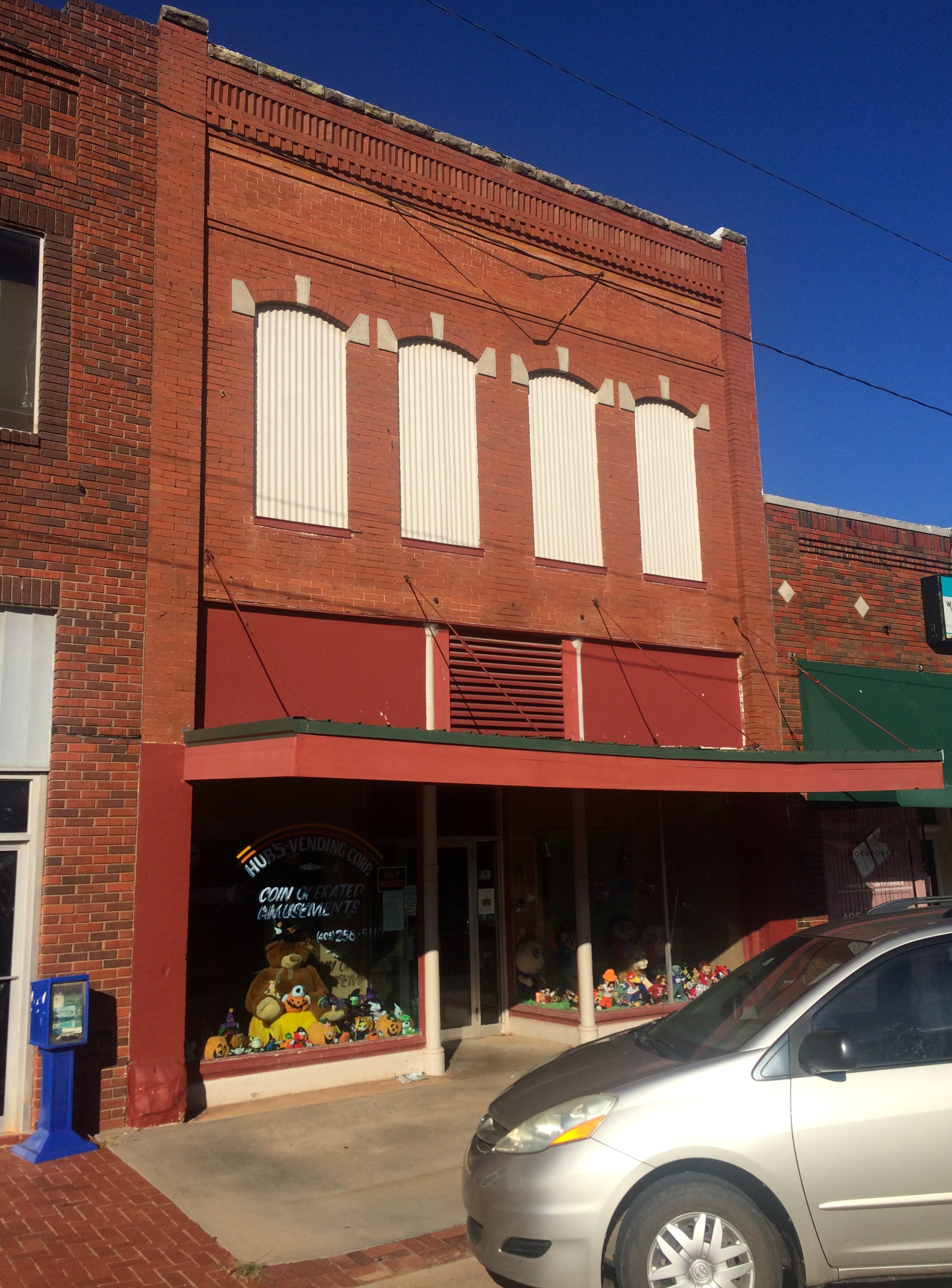
- The building in 2014

- Location within Oklahoma
- Location: 713 Manvel Avenue, Chandler, Oklahoma
- Coordinates: 35°42′12″N 96°52′31″W
- Area: less than one acre
- Built: 1903
- Architectural style: Late Victorian
- MPS: Territorial Commercial Buildings of Chandler TR
- NRHP reference No.: 84003110
- Added to NRHP: April 5, 1984

The Chandler Bookstore is a historic building in Chandler, Oklahoma. It was designed in the Late Victorian architectural style, and built in 1903 by A. E. Mascho as a dry goods store. It later became a bookstore run by Mascho's descendant, Bill. It has been listed on the National Register of Historic Places since April 5, 1984.
