= Clapp-Cunningham Building =

- U.S. National Register of Historic Places
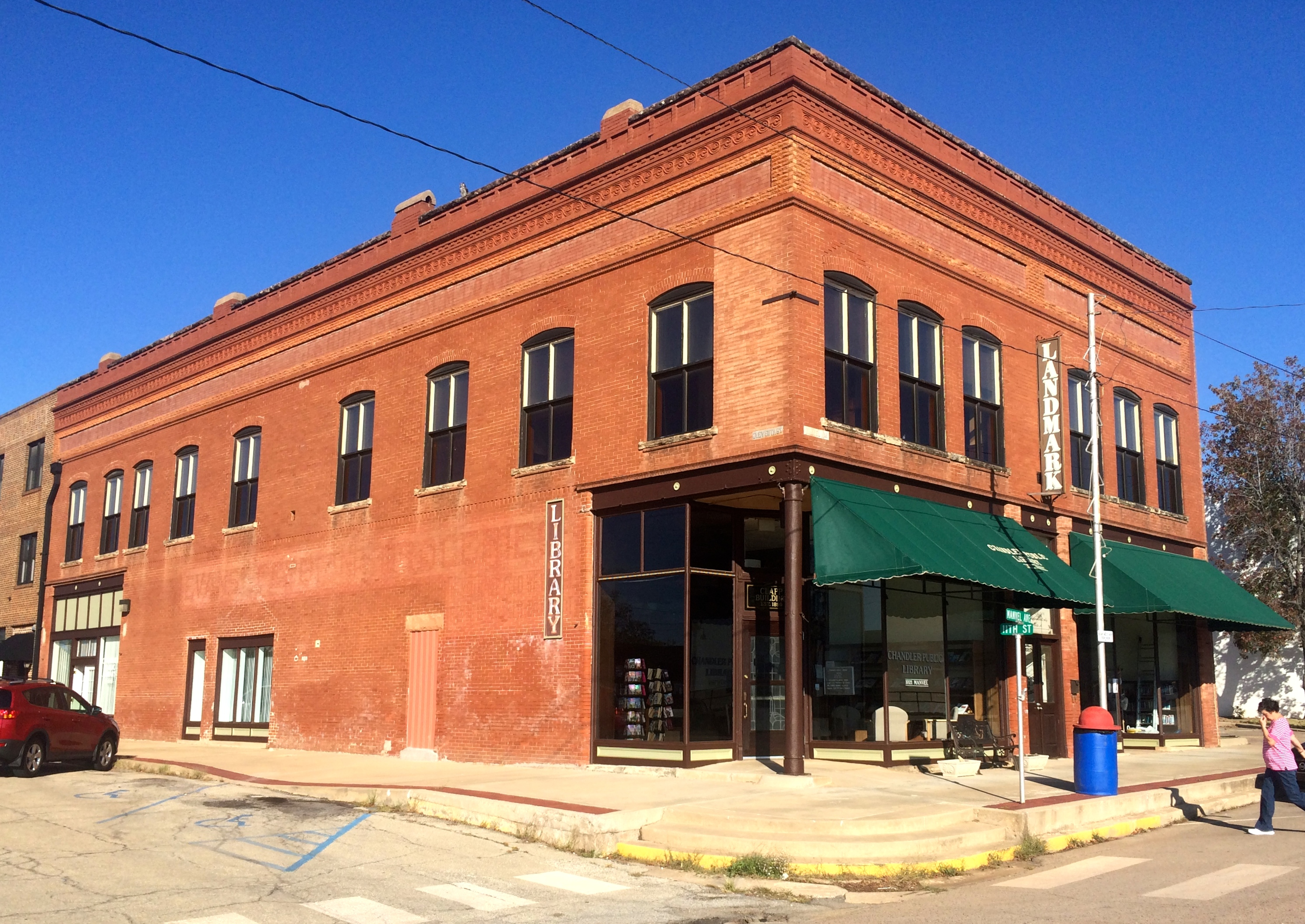
- The building in 2014

- Location within Oklahoma
- Location: 1021 Manvel Avenue, Chandler, Oklahoma
- Coordinates: 35°41′58″N 96°52′31″W
- Area: less than one acre
- Built: 1900
- Architectural style: Late Victorian
- MPS: Territorial Commercial Buildings of Chandler TR
- NRHP reference No.: 84003112
- Added to NRHP: April 5, 1984

The Clapp-Cunningham Building is a historic two-story building in Chandler, Oklahoma. It was designed in the Late Victorian architectural style, and it was built in 1900 by L.W. Clapp, a politician from Wichita, Kansas. It has been listed on the National Register of Historic Places since April 5, 1984.
