= St. Cloud Hotel =

- U.S. National Register of Historic Places
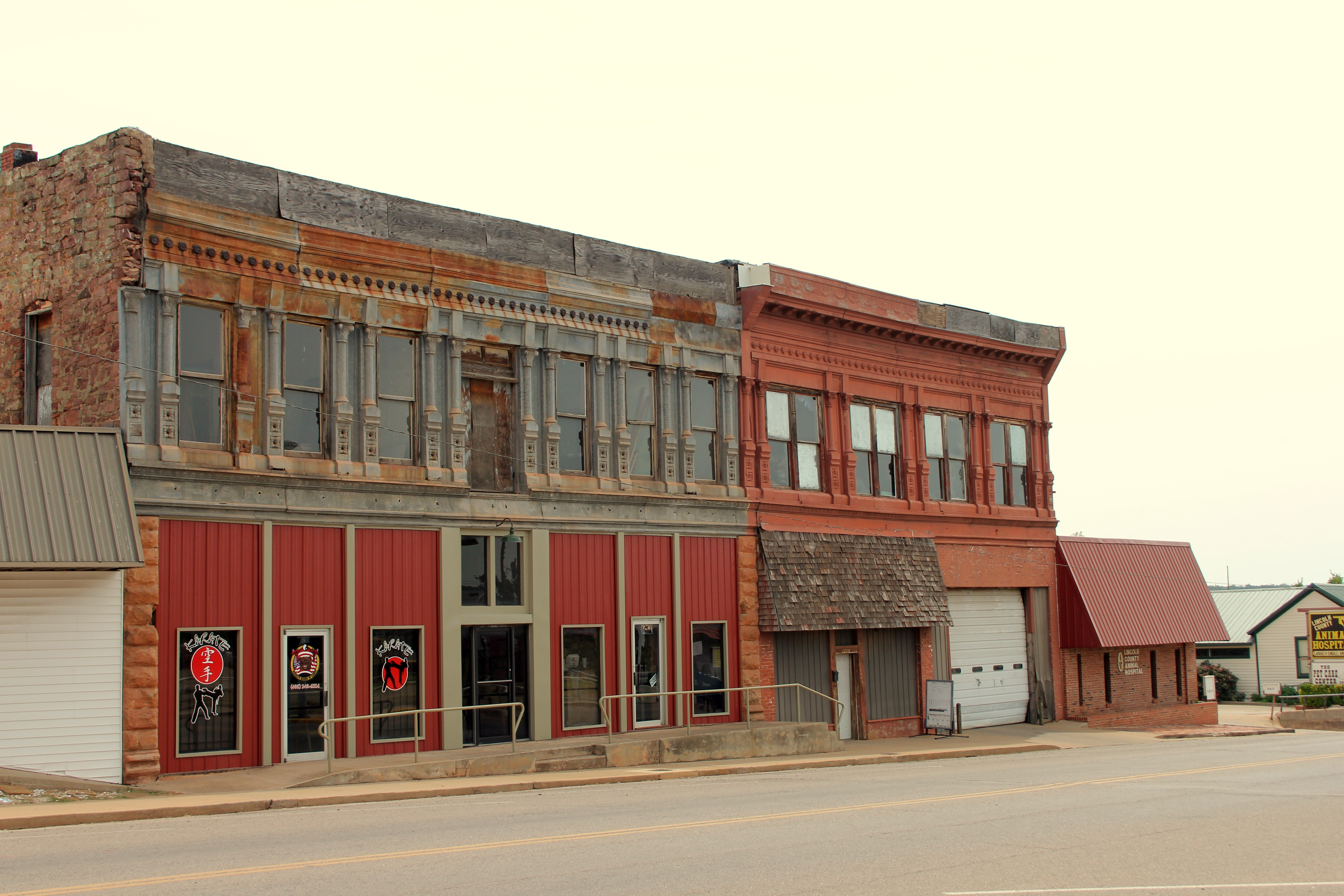
- The building in 2013

- Location within Oklahoma
- Location: 1216 Manvel Avenue, Chandler, Oklahoma
- Coordinates: 35°41′53″N 96°52′32″W
- Area: less than one acre
- Built: 1904
- MPS: Territorial Commercial Buildings of Chandler TR
- NRHP reference No.: 84003131
- Added to NRHP: April 5, 1984

St. Cloud Hotel is a historic two-story building in Chandler, Oklahoma. It was built in 1904 for John Edward Gormley. The hotel had the first elevator in Chandler. It has been listed on the National Register of Historic Places since April 5, 1984.
