= Seaba's Filling Station =

- U.S. National Register of Historic Places
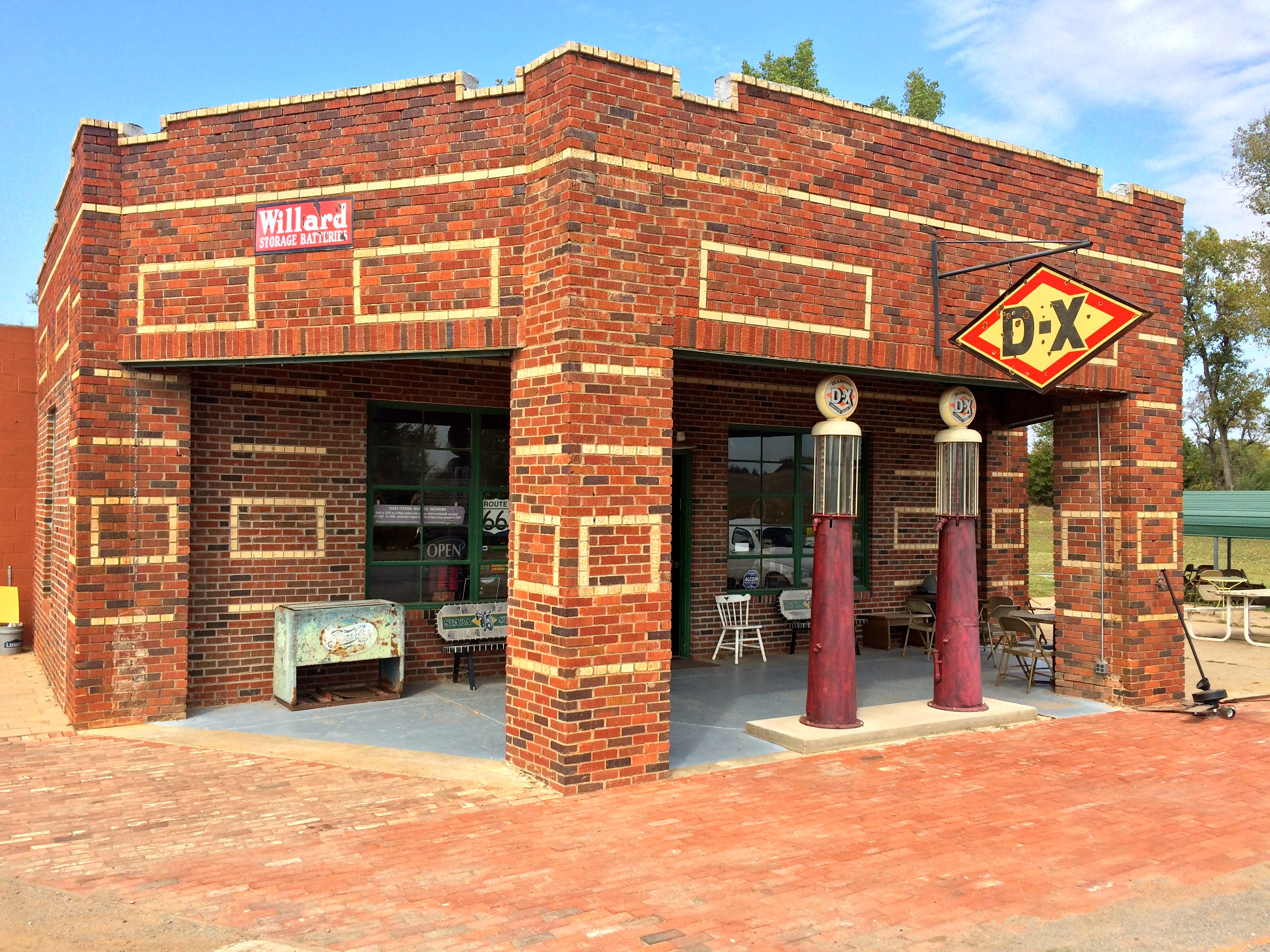

- Location within Oklahoma
- Nearest city: Chandler, Oklahoma
- Coordinates: 35°41′11″N 96°59′59″W
- Area: less than one acre
- Built: c.1921
- MPS: Route 66 in Oklahoma MPS
- NRHP reference No.: 94001609
- Added to NRHP: February 9, 1995

Seaba's Filling Station, on historic Route 66 near Chandler, Oklahoma, was listed on the National Register of Historic Places in 1995.

It is located about 8 miles (13 km) west of Chandler and was built around 1921 for the DX Oil Company. It is a one-story irregularly-shaped brick building.

== See also ==
- Narcissa D-X Gas Station
