= Wellston, Oklahoma =

- Town
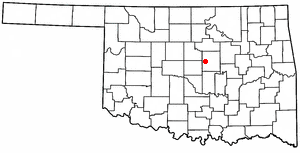
- Location of Wellston, Oklahoma
- Coordinates: 35°41′04″N 97°03′50″W
- Country: United States
- State: Oklahoma
- County: Lincoln

Area
  - Total: 1.65 sq mi (4.28 km^{2})
  - Land: 1.64 sq mi (4.24 km^{2})
  - Water: 0.015 sq mi (0.04 km^{2})
- Elevation: 938 ft (286 m)

Population (2020)
  - Total: 679
  - Density: 415.1/sq mi (160.29/km^{2})
- Time zone: UTC-6 (Central (CST))
  - Summer (DST): UTC-5 (CDT)
- ZIP code: 74881
- Area codes: 405/572
- FIPS code: 40-79900
- GNIS feature ID: 2413466
- Website: www.wellstonok.gov

Wellston is a town in Lincoln County, Oklahoma, United States. As of the 2020 census, Wellston had a population of 679.

== History ==
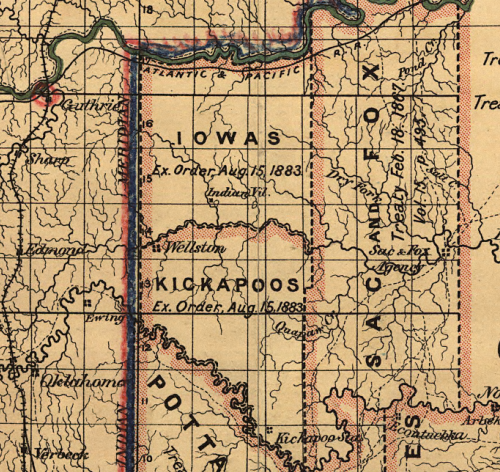
Wellston started as an Indian trading post and post office located on the old Kickapoo Reserve.

Wellston was named by Christian T. Wells, who established a trading post on the site in 1883. The post office officially opened September 19, 1884.

The trading post closed during the allotment of the Kickapoo Reserve. Following the Run of 95, the post office reopened June 15, 1897.

== Geography ==
According to the United States Census Bureau, the town has a total area of 1.4 square miles (3.6 km^{2}), all land.

== Demographics ==
Historical population
Census	Pop.	Note	%±
1900	383		—
1910	590		54.0%
1920	650		10.2%
1930	632		−2.8%
1940	607		−4.0%
1950	643		5.9%
1960	630		−2.0%
1970	789		25.2%
1980	802		1.6%
1990	912		13.7%
2000	825		−9.5%
2010	788		−4.5%
2020	679		−13.8%
U.S. Decennial Census

=== 2020 census ===
As of the 2020 census, Wellston had a population of 679. The median age was 37.8 years. 22.2% of residents were under the age of 18 and 16.2% of residents were 65 years of age or older. For every 100 females there were 94.0 males, and for every 100 females age 18 and over there were 85.3 males age 18 and over.

0.0% of residents lived in urban areas, while 100.0% lived in rural areas.

There were 283 households in Wellston, of which 29.7% had children under the age of 18 living in them. Of all households, 42.4% were married-couple households, 19.4% were households with a male householder and no spouse or partner present, and 32.9% were households with a female householder and no spouse or partner present. About 31.4% of all households were made up of individuals and 18.4% had someone living alone who was 65 years of age or older.

There were 333 housing units, of which 15.0% were vacant. The homeowner vacancy rate was 3.9% and the rental vacancy rate was 6.5%.

Racial composition as of the 2020 census
Race	Number	Percent
White	561	82.6%
Black or African American	13	1.9%
American Indian and Alaska Native	29	4.3%
Asian	0	0.0%
Native Hawaiian and Other Pacific Islander	0	0.0%
Some other race	10	1.5%
Two or more races	66	9.7%
Hispanic or Latino (of any race)	20	2.9%

=== 2000 census ===
As of the census of 2000, there were 825 people, 338 households, and 225 families residing in the town. The population density was 608.5 inhabitants per square mile (234.9/km^{2}). There were 380 housing units at an average density of 280.3 per square mile (108.2/km^{2}). The racial makeup of the town was 86.67% White, 5.58% African American, 2.91% Native American, 0.48% from other races, and 4.36% from two or more races. Hispanic or Latino of any race were 2.42% of the population.

There were 338 households, out of which 36.4% had children under the age of 18 living with them, 48.5% were married couples living together, 14.8% had a female householder with no husband present, and 33.4% were non-families. 29.9% of all households were made up of individuals, and 13.3% had someone living alone who was 65 years of age or older. The average household size was 2.44 and the average family size was 3.05.

In the town, the population was spread out, with 30.3% under the age of 18, 8.6% from 18 to 24, 28.4% from 25 to 44, 19.5% from 45 to 64, and 13.2% who were 65 years of age or older. The median age was 33 years. For every 100 females, there were 95.0 males. For every 100 females age 18 and over, there were 87.3 males.

The median income for a household in the town was $28,553, and the median income for a family was $33,906. Males had a median income of $24,911 versus $20,000 for females. The per capita income for the town was $14,052. About 12.2% of families and 13.7% of the population were below the poverty line, including 18.0% of those under age 18 and 16.7% of those age 65 or over.

== Notable people ==
- Francis Tuttle (1920–1997) American educator, born in Wellston

Norma Jean Beasler

Occupation-Singer

January 30, 1938(age 88)

Born in Wellston, Oklahoma, US

== Sources ==
Shirk, George H.; Oklahoma Place Names; University of Oklahoma Press; Norman, Oklahoma; 1987: ISBN 0-8061-2028-2 .
