= Chandler Armory =

- U.S. National Register of Historic Places
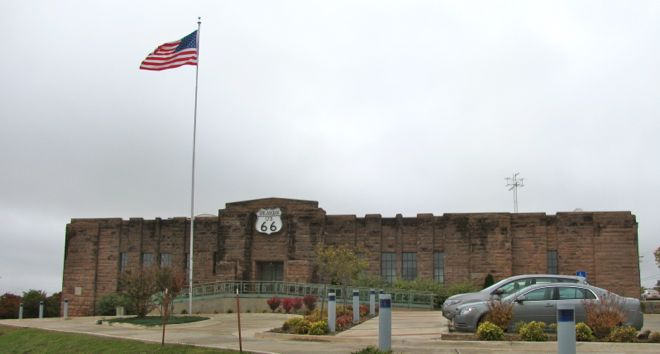

- Location within Oklahoma Location within the United States
- Location: East 1st Street; Chandler, Oklahoma
- Coordinates: 35°42′35″N 96°52′40″W
- Built: 1937
- Built by: Brian W. Nolan
- MPS: Route 66 in Oklahoma MPS
- NRHP reference No.: 91000276
- Added to NRHP: 1992

The Chandler Armory building in Chandler, Oklahoma is an Art Deco military building which now houses the Route 66 Interpretive Center, a museum devoted to understanding the construction and history of U.S. Route 66. The structure is apparently notable for having the only brick outhouse in Oklahoma, complete with original French fixture. It was built of local red sandstone by the Works Progress Administration between 1935 and 1937 as a home for Battery F, Second Battalion of the 160th Field Artillery of the Oklahoma National Guard, 45th Infantry division, and after vacation by the military in 1971 was vacant until becoming the home of the museum in 2007. The building was added to the National Register of Historic Places in 1992.

The building was designed by Brian W. Nolan, a local architect and National Guard officer. It is constructed in two parts, with the eastern section housing gun bays, offices, classrooms and a magazine under a barrel-vaulted roof. The western half comprises a wooden-floored drill hall with a stage at one end, beneath which is a narrow rifle range.

The museum contains few physical exhibits, but uses audio-visual installations, such as footage shot from a 1965 Ford Mustang, to immerse the visitor in the atmosphere of the old highway. Visitors may relax on a bed in a virtual hotel room to view the material on an overhead screen.
