= Territorial Homes of Chandler =

The Conklin House, the Johnson House, and the Kee House in Chandler, Oklahoma are Colonial Revival houses from the pre-statehood era of Oklahoma that are recognized as significant by the "Territorial Homes in Chandler" MPS.

== Conklin House ==
- Conklin House
- U.S. National Register of Historic Places
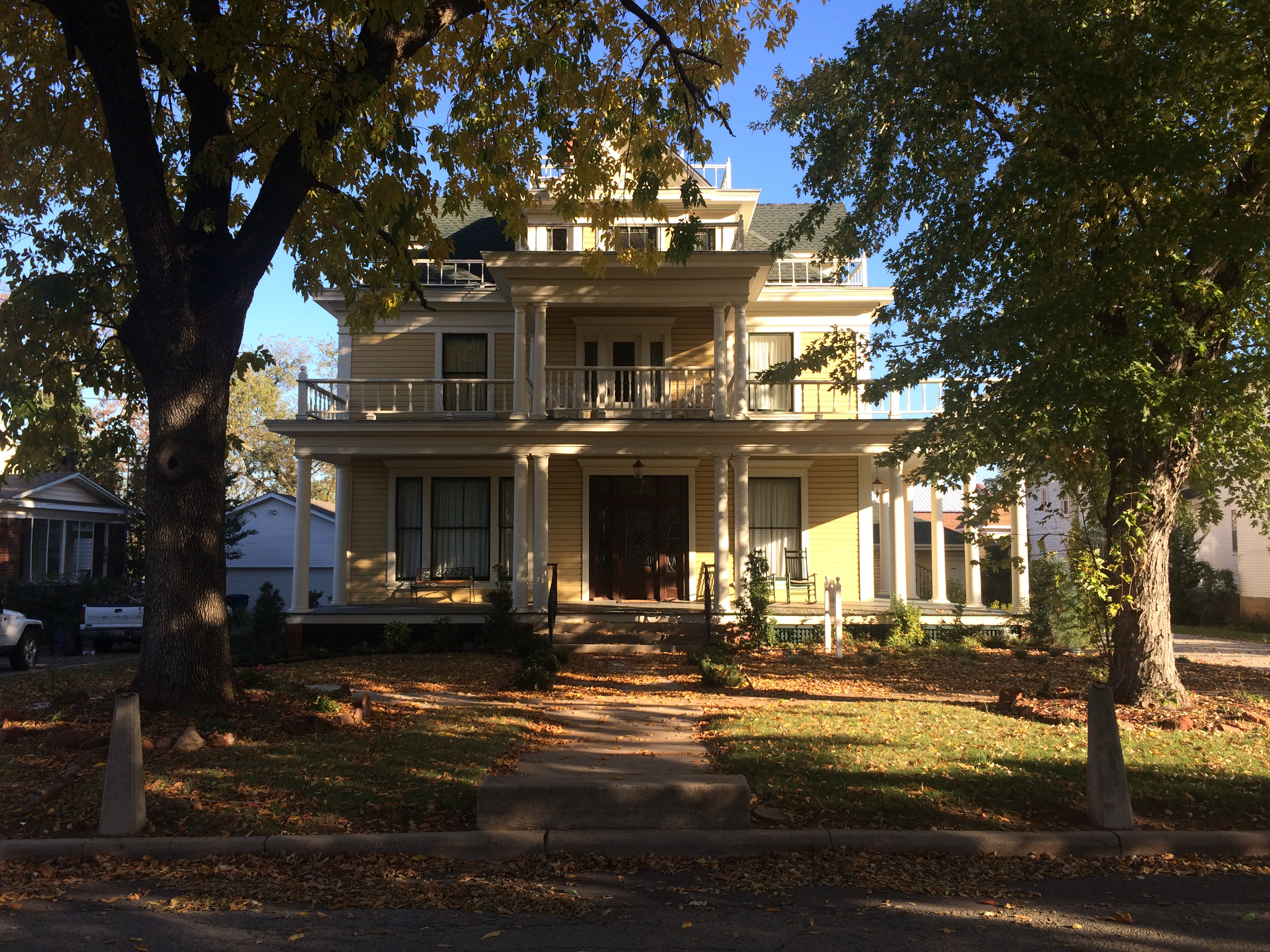

- Location within Oklahoma Location within the United States
- Location: 206 W. 8th St., Chandler, Oklahoma
- Coordinates: 35°42′9″N 96°52′56″W
- Built: 1905
- Architectural style: Colonial Revival
- MPS: Territorial Homes of Chandler MPS
- NRHP reference No.: 84003116
- Added to NRHP: September 28, 1984

The Conklin House in Chandler, Oklahoma is a Colonial Revival house that was built in 1905. It was listed on the National Register of Historic Places in 1984 as part of multiple property submission for "Territorial Homes of Chandler".

It is a 2.5-story house with a large two-story balconied portico with pedimented roof, and a veranda supported by Tuscan order columns. One of the oldest houses in town, it was regarded to be the "most impressive" in Chandler before Oklahoma's statehood and in early statehood years. It was built for E.L. Conklin, a leader in Chandler active in the Union National Bank of Chandler who also served as agent to the Sac and Fox Indians.

== Johnson House ==
- Johnson House
- U.S. National Register of Historic Places
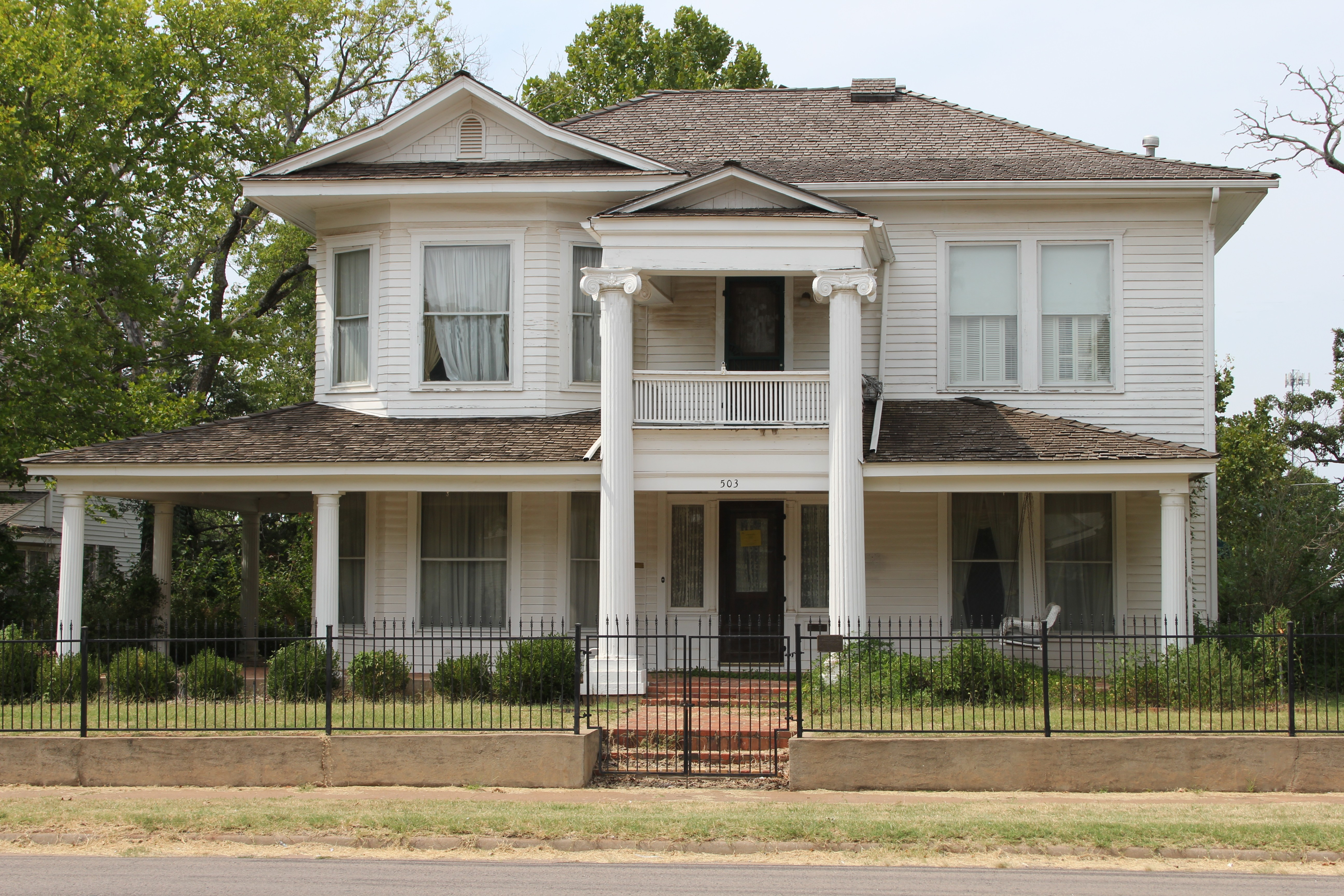
- Location: 503 Marvel Ave., Chandler, Oklahoma
- Coordinates: 35°42′20″N 96°52′51″W
- Area: less than one acre
- Built: 1897
- Architectural style: Colonial Revival
- MPS: Territorial Homes of Chandler TR
- NRHP reference No.: 84003121
- Added to NRHP: September 28, 1984

The Johnson House is a two-story white clapboard house, also with a pedimented two-tier portico. The columns supporting the pediment are Ionic order. It also has a veranda around two sides of the house, supported by five single-story Tuscan order columns.

== Kee House ==
The Kee House was built in 1898. It has a two-story balconied porch and stained glass windows. It has polychromatic walls, including red brick on the first floor level and fish scale pattern wood shingles on the second. It was originally the home of United States Marshall Kee, then William Tilghman, and later A.E. Patrick, J.W. Adams, and P.D. Erwin.
