= Agra, Oklahoma =

- Town
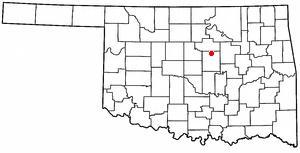
- Location of Agra, Oklahoma
- Coordinates: 35°53′42″N 96°52′13″W
- Country: United States
- State: Oklahoma
- County: Lincoln

Area
  - Total: 0.39 sq mi (1.02 km^{2})
  - Land: 0.39 sq mi (1.02 km^{2})
  - Water: 0 sq mi (0.00 km^{2})
- Elevation: 1,027 ft (313 m)

Population (2020)
  - Total: 311
  - Density: 790.6/sq mi (305.27/km^{2})
- Time zone: UTC-6 (Central (CST))
  - Summer (DST): UTC-5 (CDT)
- ZIP code: 74824
- Area codes: 539/918
- FIPS code: 40-00700
- GNIS feature ID: 2412338

Agra is a town in northern Lincoln County, Oklahoma, United States. As of the 2020 census, Agra had a population of 311. An early real estate developer coined the town's name from the word "agriculture".

== History ==
Agra began to form around the turn of 20th century. A post office opened in Agra on December 20, 1902, with Isaac C. Pierce serving as the first postmaster. The Missouri, Kansas and Oklahoma Railroad (which later became part of the Missouri, Kansas and Texas Railway (also known as MKT or "Katy") built a line from Oklahoma City to Parsons, Kansas between 1902 and 1904. (Note: The official founding date is 1904.) The townsite was developed after two local farmers, Frank Wheeler and Sam Holder, sold their lands along the railroad. American Land Loan and Trust Company divided the site into town lots.

The first businesses in town were a drugstore, opened by John Olmstead and a general store opened by Mark Crane. Otherwise, the first buildings were houses and a few churches. The Bank of Agra was built in 1904. (Note: The Bank of Agra was listed in the National Register of Historic Places (NR 90000122). Attempts to save the deteriorating bank building failed, and it was demolished in August 1999.) School was taught in churches until 1905, when the first school building was constructed. By 1918, the town had also added the Commercial Hotel and a cotton gin. Early newspapers published in Agra were the Agra News and the Queen City Times. (Note: Very early Agra residents called the town "Queen City", hence the name of the newspaper.) The Queen City Times ended publication in 1918.

Today, Agra is essentially a bedroom community, with most residents commuting to work in other towns. It is now a small country town, but has three churches, a restaurant, elementary and high school, post office, and convenience store.

== Geography ==
Agra is 14 miles (23 km) north of Chandler, the Lincoln County seat, on State Highway 18.

According to the United States Census Bureau, the town has a total area of 0.3 square miles (0.78 km^{2}), all land.

== Demographics ==
Historical population
Census	Pop.	Note	%±
1910	366		—
1920	272		−25.7%
1930	258		−5.1%
1940	281		8.9%
1950	302		7.5%
1960	265		−12.3%
1970	335		26.4%
1980	354		5.7%
1990	334		−5.6%
2000	356		6.6%
2010	339		−4.8%
2020	311		−8.3%
U.S. Decennial Census

=== 2020 census ===
As of the 2020 census, Agra had a population of 311. The median age was 34.8 years. 27.3% of residents were under the age of 18 and 16.4% of residents were 65 years of age or older. For every 100 females there were 95.6 males, and for every 100 females age 18 and over there were 86.8 males age 18 and over.

0.0% of residents lived in urban areas, while 100.0% lived in rural areas.

There were 120 households in Agra, of which 40.8% had children under the age of 18 living in them. Of all households, 42.5% were married-couple households, 21.7% were households with a male householder and no spouse or partner present, and 29.2% were households with a female householder and no spouse or partner present. About 30.8% of all households were made up of individuals and 10.8% had someone living alone who was 65 years of age or older.

There were 140 housing units, of which 14.3% were vacant. The homeowner vacancy rate was 3.8% and the rental vacancy rate was 15.1%.

Racial composition as of the 2020 census
Race	Number	Percent
White	218	70.1%
Black or African American	3	1.0%
American Indian and Alaska Native	24	7.7%
Asian	0	0.0%
Native Hawaiian and Other Pacific Islander	0	0.0%
Some other race	3	1.0%
Two or more races	63	20.3%
Hispanic or Latino (of any race)	13	4.2%

=== 2010 census ===
At the 2010 census, there were 339 people living in the town. The population density was 1,007.3 inhabitants per square mile (388.9/km^{2}). There were 152 housing units at an average density of 417 per square mile (161/km^{2}). The racial makeup of the town was 89.61% White, 5.90% Native American, and 4.49% are from two or more (mixed) races.

There were 131 households, of which 36.6% had children under the age of 18 living with them, 61.8% were married couples living together, 9.2% had a female householder with no husband present, and 24.4% were non-families. 23.7% of all households were made up of individuals, and 12.2% had someone living alone who was 65 years of age or older. The average household size was 2.72 and the average family size was 3.18.

Age distribution was 30.1% under the age of 18, 11.0% from 18 to 24, 23.6% from 25 to 44, 21.3% from 45 to 64, and 14.0% who were 65 years of age or older. The median age was 31 years. For every 100 females, there were 104.6 males. For every 100 females age 18 and over, there were 100.8 males.

The median household income was $25,750, and the median family income was $30,781. Males had a median income of $24,375 versus $12,344 for females. The per capita income for the town was $9,997. About 20.6% of families and 27.1% of the population were below the poverty line, including 36.4% of those under age 18 and 12.3% of those age 65 or over.

== Education ==
Agra is served by the Agra Independent School District.
