= Warwick, Oklahoma =

- Town
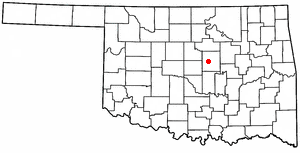
- Location of Warwick, Oklahoma
- Coordinates: 35°41′17″N 97°0′06″W
- Country: United States
- State: Oklahoma
- County: Lincoln

Area
  - Total: 2.78 sq mi (7.20 km^{2})
  - Land: 2.75 sq mi (7.11 km^{2})
  - Water: 0.035 sq mi (0.09 km^{2})
- Elevation: 860 ft (260 m)

Population (2020)
  - Total: 164
  - Density: 59.8/sq mi (23.07/km^{2})
- Time zone: UTC-6 (Central (CST))
  - Summer (DST): UTC-5 (CDT)
- FIPS code: 40-78650
- GNIS feature ID: 2413451

Warwick is a town in Lincoln County, Oklahoma, United States. The population was 184 at the 2020 census, up from 148 in 2010.

== Geography ==
Warwick is located in western Lincoln County. Interstate 44 runs through the north side of the town, with access from Exit 158, 2 miles (3 km) west of the town center. Oklahoma State Highway 66 runs through the center of the Warwick town limits, passing south of the residential portion of the town. Both highways lead west 37 miles (60 km) to Oklahoma City and northeast 68 miles (109 km) to Tulsa. U.S. Route 177 passes through the west side of Warwick, leading north 31 miles (50 km) to Stillwater and south 26 miles (42 km) to Shawnee.

According to the United States Census Bureau, the town of Warwick has a total area of 2.7 square miles (7.1 km^{2}), of which 0.04 square miles (0.1 km^{2}), or 1.26%, are water.

The Deep Fork passes through the west side of the town, flowing east toward the North Canadian River at Eufaula.

== Demographics ==
Historical population
Census	Pop.	Note	%±
1970	146		—
1980	167		14.4%
1990	160		−4.2%
2000	235		46.9%
2010	148		−37.0%
2020	164		10.8%
U.S. Decennial Census

=== 2020 census ===
As of the 2020 census, Warwick had a population of 164. The median age was 46.0 years. 22.6% of residents were under the age of 18 and 25.6% of residents were 65 years of age or older. For every 100 females there were 97.6 males, and for every 100 females age 18 and over there were 95.4 males age 18 and over.

0.0% of residents lived in urban areas, while 100.0% lived in rural areas.

There were 68 households in Warwick, of which 33.8% had children under the age of 18 living in them. Of all households, 52.9% were married-couple households, 14.7% were households with a male householder and no spouse or partner present, and 25.0% were households with a female householder and no spouse or partner present. About 17.7% of all households were made up of individuals and 7.4% had someone living alone who was 65 years of age or older.

There were 75 housing units, of which 9.3% were vacant. The homeowner vacancy rate was 1.7% and the rental vacancy rate was 0.0%.

Racial composition as of the 2020 census
Race	Number	Percent
White	152	92.7%
Black or African American	0	0.0%
American Indian and Alaska Native	5	3.0%
Asian	2	1.2%
Native Hawaiian and Other Pacific Islander	0	0.0%
Some other race	2	1.2%
Two or more races	3	1.8%
Hispanic or Latino (of any race)	7	4.3%

=== 2000 census ===
At the 2000 census there were 235 people, 85 households, and 66 families living in the town. The population density was 85.7 inhabitants per square mile (33.1/km^{2}). There were 94 housing units at an average density of 34.3 per square mile (13.2/km^{2}). The racial makeup of the town was 94.04% White, 1.70% African American, 1.28% Native American, and 2.98% from two or more races. Hispanic or Latino of any race were 0.85%.

Of the 85 households 35.3% had children under the age of 18 living with them, 63.5% were married couples living together, 10.6% had a female householder with no husband present, and 21.2% were non-families. 18.8% of households were one person and 9.4% were one person aged 65 or older. The average household size was 2.76 and the average family size was 3.09.

The age distribution was 28.5% under the age of 18, 8.5% from 18 to 24, 25.5% from 25 to 44, 23.4% from 45 to 64, and 14.0% 65 or older. The median age was 38 years. For every 100 females, there were 97.5 males. For every 100 females age 18 and over, there were 95.3 males.

The median household income was $28,438 and the median family income was $36,250. Males had a median income of $26,250 versus $27,946 for females. The per capita income for the town was $15,344. About 4.6% of families and 8.8% of the population were below the poverty line, including 18.9% of those under the age of eighteen and 6.5% of those sixty five or over.
