= First Presbyterian Church of Chandler =

Historic church in Oklahoma, United States

- U.S. National Register of Historic Places
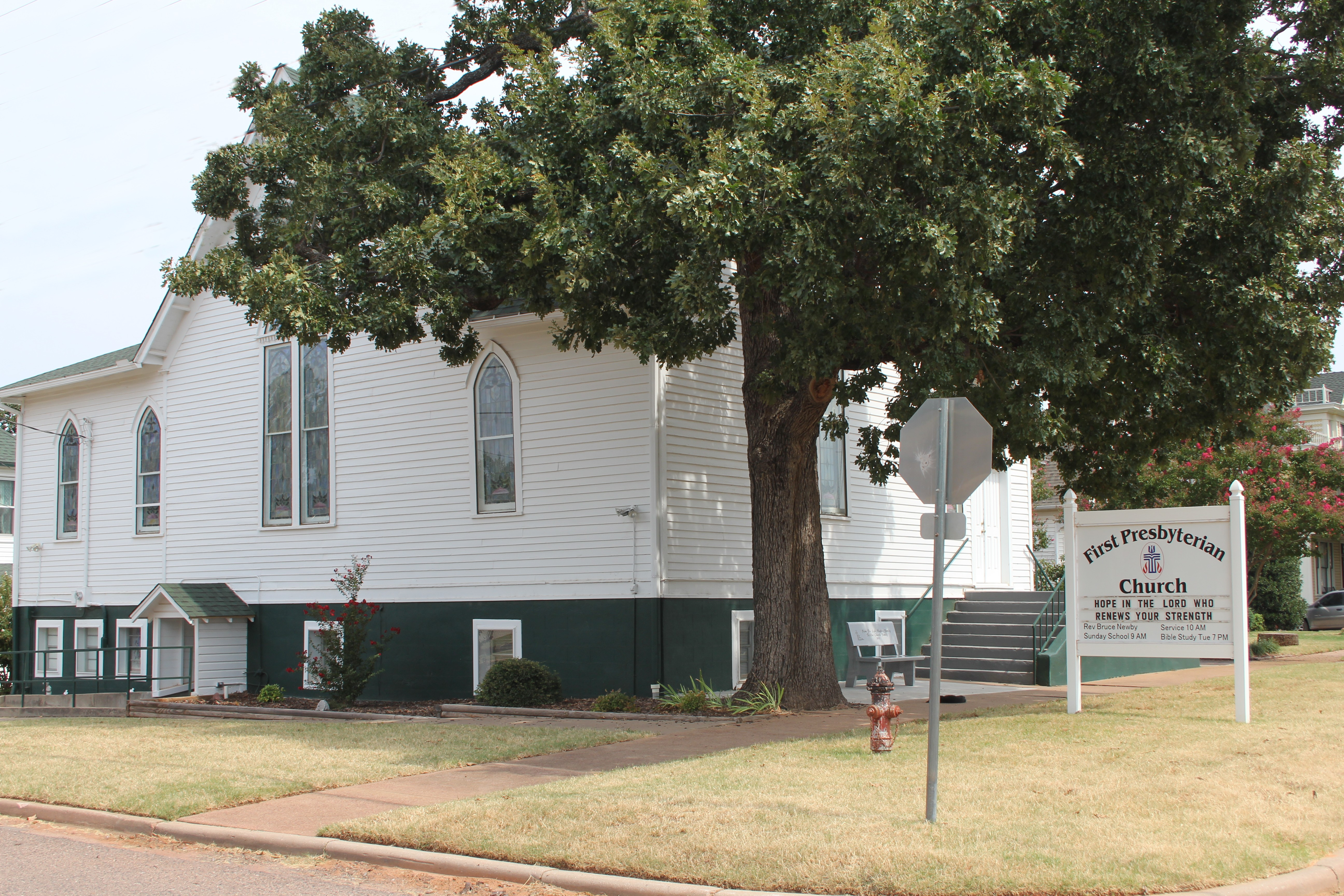

- Location within Oklahoma Location within the United States
- Location: 8th and Blaine Sts., Chandler, Oklahoma
- Coordinates: 35°42′10″N 96°52′58″W
- Area: less than one acre
- Built: 1894
- Architectural style: Carpenter Gothic
- MPS: Territorial Era Carpenter Gothic Churches TR
- NRHP reference No.: 84003118
- Added to NRHP: September 28, 1984

The First Presbyterian Church of Chandler is a historic Presbyterian church at 8th and Blaine Streets in Chandler, Oklahoma. It was built in 1894 and added to the National Register in 1984.

It is a one-story frame church on a full basement, about 25 by 30 feet (7.6 m × 9.1 m) in plan.
