= Chandler, Oklahoma =

Chandler, Oklahoma Chêninêheki
- City
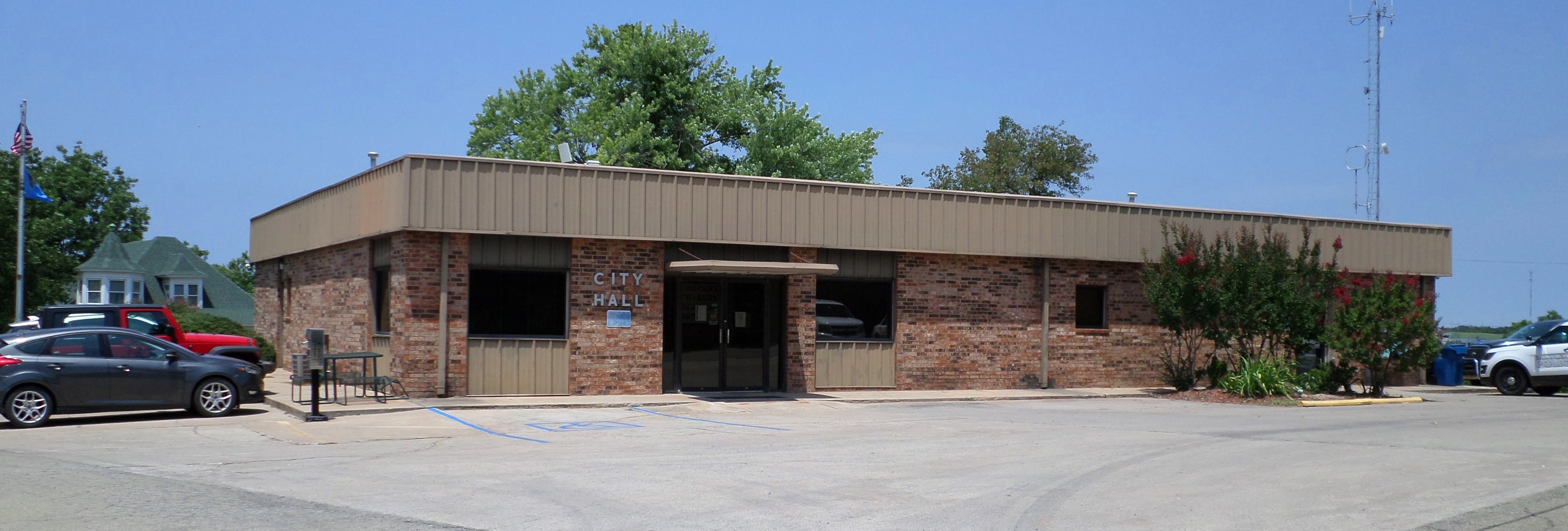
- Chandler City Hall
- Nickname: "The Pecan Capital of the World"
- Motto: "The Best Kept Secret In Central Oklahoma"
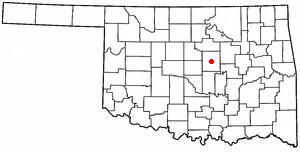
- Location of Chandler, Oklahoma
- Coordinates: 35°42′53″N 96°53′23″W
- Country: United States
- State: Oklahoma
- County: Lincoln

Area
  - Total: 10.68 sq mi (27.66 km^{2})
  - Land: 9.59 sq mi (24.85 km^{2})
  - Water: 1.08 sq mi (2.80 km^{2})
- Elevation: 883 ft (269 m)

Population (2020)
  - Total: 2,858
  - Density: 300/sq mi (115/km^{2})
- Time zone: UTC-6 (Central (CST))
  - Summer (DST): UTC-5 (CDT)
- ZIP code: 74834
- Area codes: 405/572
- FIPS code: 40-13500
- GNIS feature ID: 2409434
- Website: www.chandlerok.gov

Chandler (Meskwaki: Chêninêheki) is a city in and the county seat of Lincoln County, Oklahoma, United States. and is part of the Oklahoma City Metropolitan Area. The population was 2,858 at the time of the 2020 census. Chandler is located northeast of Oklahoma City on SH-66 and I-44, north of Shawnee on SH-18 and 14 miles (23 km) south of Agra.

== History ==
Chandler was named after Judge George Chandler, also Assistant Secretary of the Interior. The site of Chandler was opened by a land run on September 28, 1891. The town had been planned to be opened on September 22 (the date of the Land Run of 1891), but the site survey had not been completed. The Chandler Post Office had opened on September 21, the day before the planned run. When Oklahoma Territory County A (Lincoln County) was organized, Chandler became the county seat. On March 30, 1897, a tornado destroyed most of the fledgling town and killed 14 residents.

In 1891, the county government operated from an office building until a courthouse was built. The courthouse was destroyed by the tornado of 1897, and a two-story frame building was erected as a temporary courthouse on the present site. The building was removed in 1907 to make way for a stone courthouse. This third courthouse burned down on December 23, 1967, and the current courthouse was constructed in its place.

On July 31, 1894, Cherokee Bill and the gang he was riding with stole $500 from the Lincoln County Bank in Chandler, Oklahoma.

The St. Louis and Oklahoma City Railroad (later the St. Louis and San Francisco Railway, also known as the "Frisco") built a line through Chandler in 1898. Another railroad, the Choctaw, Oklahoma and Western Railroad (later a part of the Chicago, Rock Island and Pacific Railway), built between Chandler and Guthrie in the 1902-1903 timeframe. The railroads enabled Chandler to move its agricultural products, as well as bricks made by the Chandler Brick Company, to markets.

Chandler is one of the many cities along the famous U.S. Route 66 and contains a number of attractions to devotees of "The Mother Road." These include the Route 66 Interpretive Center, the Oklahoma Law Enforcement Museum and Hall of Fame, the Lincoln County Museum of Pioneer History, several Route 66-themed murals, the newly restored old cottage-style Phillips 66 gas station, and one of the last remaining painted barns advertising Meramec Caverns, which is on Route 66 in Missouri.

U.S. Route 66 brought a significant amount of commercial business to Chandler, due to travelers crossing the state and the country; much of this business died out when the Turner Turnpike (Interstate 44) was built.

In 1949, the Oklahoma legislature declared Chandler to be "The pecan capital of the world," in Resolution No. 5.

In 1958, professional baseball player Bo Belcher opened Chandler Baseball Camp. For 42 years, the camp hosted campers from around the world for a bootcamp-like baseball camp during the summer. The camp closed in 2000 due to the death of Tom Belcher (not to be confused with fellow baseball player Tim Belcher). In 2011, it was added to the National Register of Historic Places.

== Geography ==
According to the United States Census Bureau, Chandler has a total area of 8.1 square miles (21 km^{2}), of which 7.3 square miles (19 km^{2}) is land and 0.9 square miles (2.3 km^{2}) (10.43%) is water.

=== Climate ===
Climate data for Chandler, Oklahoma (1981–2010 normals, extremes 1901–2011)
Month	Jan	Feb	Mar	Apr	May	Jun	Jul	Aug	Sep	Oct	Nov	Dec	Year
Record high °F (°C)	87 (31)	92 (33)	102 (39)	102 (39)	100 (38)	109 (43)	115 (46)	118 (48)	110 (43)	99 (37)	88 (31)	84 (29)	118 (48)
Mean daily maximum °F (°C)	51.2 (10.7)	55.9 (13.3)	64.7 (18.2)	73.8 (23.2)	81.1 (27.3)	88.7 (31.5)	94.5 (34.7)	94.3 (34.6)	86.0 (30.0)	75.4 (24.1)	63.7 (17.6)	52.1 (11.2)	73.5 (23.1)
Daily mean °F (°C)	37.7 (3.2)	41.9 (5.5)	50.5 (10.3)	59.7 (15.4)	68.7 (20.4)	76.8 (24.9)	82.1 (27.8)	81.3 (27.4)	72.7 (22.6)	61.5 (16.4)	50.1 (10.1)	39.3 (4.1)	60.2 (15.7)
Mean daily minimum °F (°C)	24.2 (−4.3)	27.9 (−2.3)	36.3 (2.4)	45.7 (7.6)	56.2 (13.4)	64.9 (18.3)	69.6 (20.9)	68.3 (20.2)	59.4 (15.2)	47.7 (8.7)	36.5 (2.5)	26.5 (−3.1)	46.9 (8.3)
Record low °F (°C)	−20 (−29)	−19 (−28)	−5 (−21)	20 (−7)	30 (−1)	43 (6)	50 (10)	47 (8)	32 (0)	14 (−10)	8 (−13)	−13 (−25)	−20 (−29)
Average precipitation inches (mm)	1.29 (33)	1.82 (46)	3.21 (82)	3.35 (85)	5.09 (129)	4.87 (124)	2.71 (69)	2.94 (75)	3.80 (97)	3.69 (94)	2.58 (66)	1.95 (50)	37.30 (947)
Average precipitation days (≥ 0.01 in)	2.9	3.3	5.3	4.9	6.8	6.4	4.1	4.7	5.3	5.1	4.4	3.6	56.8
Source: NOAA

== Demographics ==
Historical population
Census	Pop.	Note	%±
1900	1,430		—
1910	2,024		41.5%
1920	2,226		10.0%
1930	2,717		22.1%
1940	2,738		0.8%
1950	2,724		−0.5%
1960	2,524		−7.3%
1970	2,529		0.2%
1980	2,926		15.7%
1990	2,596		−11.3%
2000	2,842		9.5%
2010	3,100		9.1%
2020	2,858		−7.8%
U.S. Decennial Census

=== 2020 census ===
As of the 2020 census, Chandler had a population of 2,858. The median age was 40.4 years, 22.7% of residents were under the age of 18, and 19.8% of residents were 65 years of age or older. For every 100 females there were 93.4 males, and for every 100 females age 18 and over there were 89.4 males age 18 and over.

There were 1,195 households in Chandler, of which 30.8% had children under the age of 18 living in them. Of all households, 40.1% were married-couple households, 20.0% were households with a male householder and no spouse or partner present, and 32.1% were households with a female householder and no spouse or partner present. About 33.1% of all households were made up of individuals and 15.3% had someone living alone who was 65 years of age or older.

There were 1,369 housing units, of which 12.7% were vacant. Among occupied housing units, 59.7% were owner-occupied and 40.3% were renter-occupied. The homeowner vacancy rate was 2.6% and the rental vacancy rate was 9.6%.

<0.1% of residents lived in urban areas, while 100.0% lived in rural areas.

Racial composition as of the 2020 census
Race	Percent
White	72.3%
Black or African American	6.8%
American Indian and Alaska Native	7.1%
Asian	0.5%
Native Hawaiian and Other Pacific Islander	0.1%
Some other race	1.3%
Two or more races	12.0%
Hispanic or Latino (of any race)	3.2%

=== 2010 census ===
As of the 2010 census, there were 3,100 people, 1,204 households, and 801 families residing in the city.

The population density was 389.3 inhabitants per square mile (150.3/km^{2}). There were 1,403 housing units at an average density of 176.7 per square mile (68.2/km^{2}). The racial makeup of the city was 79.77% White, 9.68% African American, 5.63% Native American, 0.39% Asian, 0.49% from other races, and 4.05% from two or more races. Hispanic or Latino of any race were 1.79% of the population.

Of all households, 31.2% had children under the age of 18 living with them, 47.1% were married couples living together, 14.0% had a female householder with no husband present, and 34.8% were non-families. 32.1% of all households were made up of individuals, and 17.3% had someone living alone who was 65 years of age or older. The average household size was 2.36 and the average family size was 2.98.

In the city, the population was spread out, with 25.7% under the age of 18, 8.7% from 18 to 24, 25.3% from 25 to 44, 20.7% from 45 to 64, and 19.6% who were 65 years of age or older. The median age was 38 years. For every 100 females, there were 89.8 males. For every 100 females age 18 and over, there were 84.0 males.

The median income for a household in the city was $26,833, and the median income for a family was $35,744. Males had a median income of $28,125 versus $19,397 for females. The per capita income for the city was $14,676. About 12.1% of families and 16.7% of the population were below the poverty line, including 20.3% of those under age 18 and 15.4% of those age 65 or over.

== Economy ==
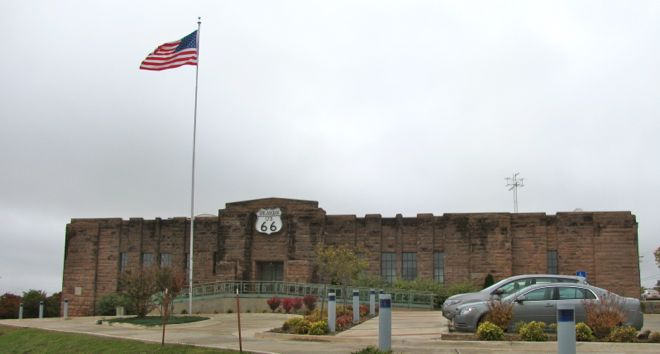
Old Armory, now a Route 66 Museum

Today, Chandler's economy is driven mostly by agriculture and livestock, oil and gas services, and manufacturing. The National American Insurance Company is headquartered in Chandler. Downtown Chandler, which is located on historic Route 66, is home to many shops and restaurants. Lincoln County's first Wal-Mart Supercenter opened in 2008 on the east side of Chandler.

The Ioway Casino opened west of Chandler on June 1, 2013. The Ioway Casino is operated by the Iowa Tribe of Oklahoma and is the sister casino to Cimarron Casino located in Perkins. The Ioway Casino has 250 machines and is located on SH-66 between Chandler and US-177.

== Recreation ==
Chandler is home to several city parks, a baseball complex, a splash pad, and a municipal swimming pool. Chandler has two lakes, Bell Cow Lake, and Chandler Lake. Bell Cow Lake, which features camping, boating, fishing, and horse trails, is located north of town, along with Chandler Golf Course. The Lincoln County Raceway, a quarter mile dirt track, is located south of Chandler.

== Notable people ==
- Thomas G. Andrews city and county attorney also Associate Judge of the Oklahoma Supreme Court.
- Wade Ellis (1909 – 1989), mathematician and professor
- Sam P. Gilstrap (1907–1989), U.S. Ambassador to Malawi
- Jon Gray, baseball player
- Roy Harris, (1898 – 1979), composer, born in Chandler
- James C. Nance, Oklahoma newspaper publisher and politician
- Joseph C. Pringey (1858 – 1935), politician and U.S. Representative
- James Brooks Ayers Robertson (1871 – 1938), fourth governor of Oklahoma
- Bill Tilghman (1854 – 1924), frontier lawman

== Education ==
Chandler and the surrounding area is served by the Chandler Public School District. The Chandler High School Alumni Association describes itself as "the oldest and most active" in the state.

Chandler High School Lions State Championships:

- 2016 Fast Pitch Softball State Champs
- 2016 Slow Pitch Softball State Champs
- 2015 Slow Pitch Softball State Champs
- 2005 Baseball State Champs
- 2005 Football State Champs
- 1998 Baseball State Champs
- 1998 Pom State Champs
- 1997 Baseball State Champs
- 1997 Boys Basketball State Champs
- 1984 Football State Champs
- 1972 Boys Basketball State Champs
- 1933 Girls Basketball State Champs

== National Register of Historic Places ==
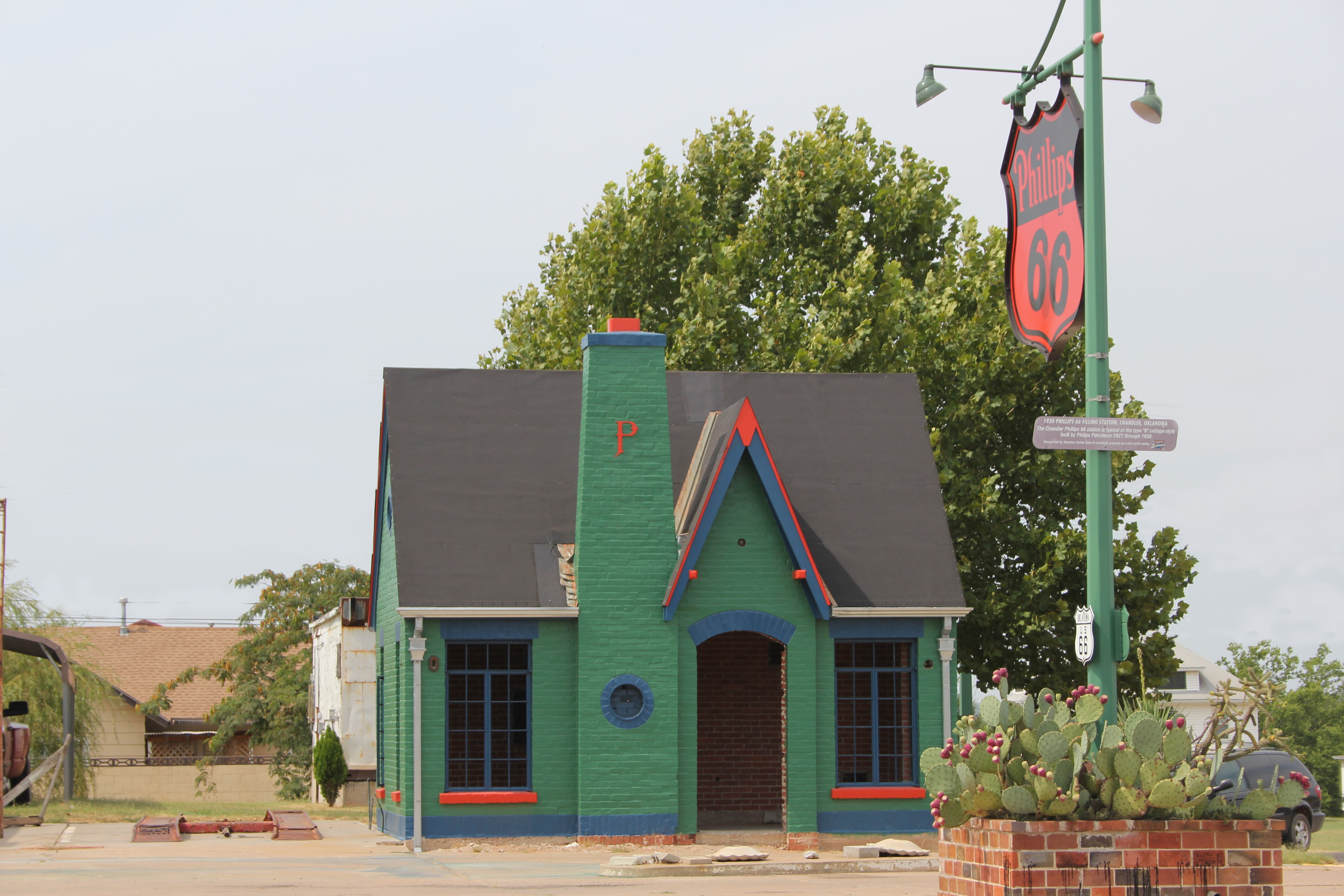
Former Phillips 66 Gas Station at 701 S. Manvel

- Boston Store
- Chandler Armory
- Chandler Baseball Camp
- Chandler Bookstore
- Chandler High School
- Clapp-Cunningham Building
- Conklin House
- Crane Motor Company Building
- First Presbyterian Church of Chandler
- Johnson House
- Mascho Building and Public Privy (Murphy Building)
- National Guard Statistical Building
- Oleson-Crane Building
- St. Cloud Hotel
- St. Stephen's Episcopal Church
- Wolcott Building
- Midlothian School
- Seaba's Filling Station
- Spring Dell School
- Marshall William M. Tilghman Homestead
