= Oklahoma Secretary of Commerce =

- Great Seal of Oklahoma

Agency overview
- Formed: June 6, 1986
- Headquarters: 900 N Stiles Avenue Oklahoma City, Oklahoma
- Minister responsible: Secretary of Commerce
- Child agencies: Department of Commerce; Department of Labor; Employment Security Commission; Housing Finance Agency; Workers' Compensation Commission
- Website: Office of the Secretary of Commerce

The Oklahoma Secretary of Commerce is a member of the Oklahoma Governor's Cabinet. The Secretary is appointed by the Governor, with the consent of the Oklahoma Senate, to serve at the pleasure of the Governor. The Secretary serves as the chief advisor to the Governor on economic development and trade promotion.

The current Secretary is Deborah Moorad.

== Overview ==
The secretary of commerce was established in 1986 to provide greater oversight and coordination to the State's economic development activities. The position was established, along with the Oklahoma Governor's Cabinet, by the Executive Branch Reform Act of 1986. The act directed the secretary to advise the governor on economic development policy and advise the state's economic development agencies on new policy as directed by the governor. As such, the secretary is responsible for directing the state's development projects to economically distressed communities in order to generate new employment, help retain existing jobs and stimulate industrial and commercial growth.

Oklahoma state law allows for cabinet secretaries to serve concurrently as the head of a state agency in addition to their duties as a cabinet secretary. Historically, the secretary of commerce has also served as the director of the Oklahoma Department of Commerce. However, the current secretary Sean P. Kouplen does not share this role, with the position commerce director currently filled by Brent Kisling.

The secretary, unless filling an additional role which carries a greater salary, is entitled to annual pay of $70,000. Despite this law, if the secretary serves as the head of a state agency, the secretary receives the higher of the two salaries.

== Agencies overseen ==
The Secretary of Commerce oversees the following state entities:

- Department of Commerce
- Department of Labor
- Employment Security Commission
- Housing Finance Agency
- Workers' Compensation Commission

== Budget ==
The Secretary of Commerce oversees a budget for Fiscal Year 2020 of $372 million. The budget authorization is broken down as follows:

Agency	Funding (in millions)	Employees (in FTEs)
Economic Development
Department of Commerce	84.8	107
Housing Finance Agency	141.7	100
Developmental Finance Authority	1.8	5
SUBTOTAL	228.3	212
Workforce Development
Department of Labor	8.3	82
Employment Security Commission	105.2	799
SUBTOTAL	113.5	881
Professional Licensure
Professional Licensing Boards	30.5	222
SUBTOTAL	30.5	222
TOTAL	$372.3	1,315

== List of secretaries ==
Name	Took office	Left office	Governor served under
Secretary of Commerce
Dean Werries	1995	1997	Frank Keating
Ron Rosenfeld	1997	1998	Frank Keating
Howard Barnett, Jr.	1998	1999	Frank Keating
Russell M. Perry	2000	2001	Frank Keating
Vacant	2001	2003	Frank Keating
Secretary of Commerce and Tourism
Kathy Taylor	2003	2006	Brad Henry
Natalie Shirley	2007	2011	Brad Henry
Dave Lopez	2011	2013	Mary Fallin
Secretary of Commerce
Larry Parman	2013	2014	Mary Fallin
Deby Snodgrass	2014	2015	Mary Fallin
Secretary of Commerce and Tourism
Deby Snodgrass	2015	2019	Mary Fallin
Secretary of Commerce and Workforce Development
Sean Kouplen	2019	2021	Kevin Stitt
Chad Mariska	2022	2022	Kevin Stitt
Deborah Moorad	2025	Present	Kevin Stitt
