= Oklahoma Secretary of Commerce and Tourism =

- Great Seal of Oklahoma

Agency overview
- Formed: February 1, 2003
- Preceding agency: Secretary of Commerce Secretary of Tourism and Recreation
- Headquarters: 900 N Stiles Avenue; Oklahoma City, Oklahoma
- Employees: 1883 (FY2011)
- Annual budget: $758 million (FY2011)
- Minister responsible: Deby Snodgrass, Secretary of Commerce and Tourism
- Child agency: Oklahoma Department of Commerce; Oklahoma Department of Labor; Oklahoma Employment Security Commission
- Website: Office of the Secretary of Commerce and Tourism

This page relates the history of the position of Oklahoma Secretary of Commerce and Tourism.

== History ==
The Oklahoma Secretary of Commerce and Tourism was a member of the Oklahoma Governor's Cabinet. The Secretary was appointed by the Governor, with the consent of the Oklahoma Senate, to serve at the pleasure of the Governor. The Secretary served as the chief advisor to the Governor on economic development and cultural heritage.

The second and last Secretary was Dave Lopez, who was appointed by Governor Mary Fallin on January 27, 2011.

The position of Secretary of Commerce and Tourism was established in 2003 when Governor Brad Henry issued an executive order merging the former positions of Secretary of Commerce and Secretary of Tourism and Recreation into a single position. Previously, both positions had existed since 1986 when they were established by the Executive Branch Reform Act of 1986.

On July 16, 2013, Governor Mary Fallin announced the re-creation of the Secretary of Tourism position and restored the original title of Oklahoma Secretary of Commerce as a result.

== Dual position ==
Oklahoma state law allows for cabinet secretaries to serve concurrently as the head of a state agency in addition to their duties as a cabinet secretary. Historically, the secretary of commerce and tourism often served as the director of the Oklahoma Department of Commerce. In 2012–2013, Secretary Dave Lopez became the first to not serve in that dual position when he resigned as executive director and Jonna Kirschner was appointed to replace him in that capacity alone.

== Responsibilities ==
The Secretary of Commerce and Tourism is responsible for promoting economic development and growth, protecting the State's heritage and history, providing unemployment benefits, promoting housing development, and overseeing workforce development programs.

As of fiscal year 2011, the Secretary of Commerce and Tourism oversees 1883 full-time employees and is responsible for an annual budget of $758 million.

== Agencies overseen ==
The Secretary of Commerce and Tourism oversees the following State entities:

- Governor's Council for Workforce and Economic Development
- Capital Investment Board
- Department of Commerce
- Department of Labor
- Department of Tourism and Recreation
- Development Finance Authority
- Employment Security Commission
- Housing Finance Agency
- Historical Society
- Scenic Rivers Commission

== Salary ==
The annual salary of the Secretary of Commerce and Tourism is set by law at $70,000. Despite this law, if the Secretary serves as the head of a state agency, the Secretary receives the higher of the two salaries. Since incumbent Cabinet Secretary Dave Lopez also serves as the Commerce Department Director, he received the salary allowed for that position. As of 2010, the annual salary of that position is set at $112,500.

== List of secretaries ==
Secretary of Commerce (1986–2003)

Name	Took office	Left office	Governor served under
Dean Werries	1995	1997	Frank Keating
Ron Rosenfeld	1997	1998	Frank Keating
Howard Barnett, Jr.	1998	1999	Frank Keating
Russell M. Perry	2000	2001	Frank Keating
Vacant	2001	2003	Frank Keating

Secretary of Tourism and Recreation (1986–2003)

Name	Took office	Left office	Governor served under
Edward H. Cook	1995	1999	Frank Keating
Jane Anne Jayroe	1999	2003	Frank Keating

Secretary of Commerce and Tourism (2003–present)

#	Name	Took office	Left office	Governor served under
1	Kathy Taylor	2003	2006	Brad Henry
2	Natalie Shirley	February 14, 2007	January 10, 2011	Brad Henry
3	Dave Lopez	January 27, 2011	November 1, 2013	Mary Fallin
