= Natalie Shirley =

American politician (born 1957)

Oklahoma Secretary of Commerce and Tourism
- In office February 14, 2007 – January 10, 2011
- Governor: Brad Henry
- Preceded by: Kathy Taylor
- Succeeded by: Dave Lopez

Director of the Oklahoma Department of Commerce
- In office June 6, 2007 – January 10, 2011
- Governor: Brad Henry
- Preceded by: Amy Polonchek
- Succeeded by: Dave Lopez

Personal details
- Born: 1957 (age 68–69)
- Education: Oklahoma State University; OU College of Law
- Occupation: Lawyer, businesswoman

Natalie Shirley (born 1957) is an American lawyer and businesswoman and university president from Oklahoma. Shirley previously served as the Oklahoma Secretary of Commerce and Tourism under Governor of Oklahoma Brad Henry, having been in that position from 2007 to 2011. She was Governor Henry's second Secretary of Commerce and Tourism, having succeeded Kathy Taylor. Concurrent with her service as Commerce Secretary, Shirley was appointed by Governor Henry to serve as the director of the Oklahoma Department of Commerce from 2007 to 2011. In March 2012, she became the fourth president at Oklahoma State University-Oklahoma City.

== Personal life and education ==
Born in Oklahoma, Shirley earned a bachelor's degree in psychology and a bachelor's degree in political science from Oklahoma State University in 1979 and earned a J.D. degree from the University of Oklahoma in 1982. Shirley then served as an associate with a private law firm in Oklahoma City and as Deputy General Counsel with the Oklahoma Department of Securities.

Shirley joined the Washington, D.C., firm ICI Mutual Insurance Group and served ICI in a variety of positions over a 16-year period, including Executive Vice President, chief operating officer, and General Counsel. She became the president and CEO of ICI in 2002.

In addition to her current role as OSU-OKC President, Shirley serves on several philanthropic boards including the World Association for Children and Parents (WACAP), Calm Waters Center for Children and Families, the Oklahoma CASA (Court Appointed Special Advocates for Children) Association, and the Jasmine Moran Children's Museum.

She lives in the Heritage Hills neighborhood in Oklahoma City and is the mother of six children.

== President of Oklahoma State University – Oklahoma City ==
After the death of President Jerry Carroll, Oklahoma State University – Oklahoma City conducted a national search for its next president. Shirley was selected and began serving as the president of the Oklahoma State University's Oklahoma City campus in May 2011. She is the fourth president in the university's 50-year history, as well as the first female president of OSU-OKC. Shirley concurrently serves as president of Oklahoma State University-Oklahoma City and as Oklahoma Secretary of Education and Workforce Development. Shirley was hired in May 2011 as the first female president in the OSU system. Shirley's investiture as the fourth president of OSU-OKC was held on March 12, 2012, at St. Lukes United Methodist Church during a week of celebration marking the 50th anniversary of the school.

== Secretary of Education and Workforce Development ==
In January 2015, Shirley was appointed by Governor Mary Fallin to serve in her Cabinet as Secretary of Education and Workforce Development. In this position, Shirley is working with the Governor to implement the Oklahoma Works program, which is designed to increase educational attainment for Oklahomans to produce a more educated workforce to support and cultivate the state's economy.

== Secretary of Commerce and Tourism ==
On February 14, 2007, following the resignation of Kathy Taylor to run for Mayor of Tulsa, Oklahoma, Governor of Oklahoma Brad Henry appointed Shirley as his second Secretary of Commerce and Tourism. As Secretary of Commerce and Tourism, Shirley is responsible for overseeing Oklahoma's economic development agencies, including the Oklahoma Department of Commerce, the Oklahoma Department of Tourism and Recreation, the Oklahoma Housing Finance Agency, and the Oklahoma Employment Security Commission. Later in 2007, Commerce Department Director Amy Polonchek resigned to accept a position with the Meridian Technology Center for Business Development. On June 6, 2007, Governor Henry appointed Shirley as the director of the Commerce Department, giving her direct control over the Department.

== See also ==
- Oklahoma State Cabinet

Political offices
Preceded by Kathy Taylor	Oklahoma Secretary of Commerce and Tourism; Under Governor Brad Henry; February 14, 2007 – January 10, 2011	Succeeded by Dave Lopez
Preceded by Amy Polonchek	Director of the Oklahoma Department of Commerce; Under Governor Brad Henry; June 6, 2007 – January 10, 2011	Succeeded by Dave Lopez
