= Don McCorkell =

American politician

Member of the Oklahoma House of Representatives from the 72nd district
- In office 1979–1996
- Preceded by: Mandell Matheson
- Succeeded by: Darrell Gilbert

Personal details
- Born: June 28, 1947 Baltimore, Maryland
- Died: March 25, 2025 (aged 77) Santa Barbara, California
- Party: Democratic
- Spouse: Marilyn (m. 1969)
- Education: University of Tulsa (BA); University of Tulsa College of Law (J.D.)

Don L. McCorkell, Jr (June 28, 1947 - March 25, 2025) was an American politician and filmmaker who served as a member of the Oklahoma House of Representatives representing the 72nd district between 1979 and 1996.

He ran unsuccessful Democratic primary campaigns in the 1996 United States Senate election in Oklahoma and 2006 Tulsa mayoral election.

== Early life and education ==
Donald L. McCorkell was born on June 28, 1947, in Baltimore, Maryland. He graduated from the University of Tulsa and the University of Tulsa College of Law.

== Oklahoma House ==
Don McCorkell represented the 72nd district of the Oklahoma House of Representatives between 1978 and 1996.

In 1996, McCorkell retired to run in the Democratic primary for one of Oklahoma's United States Senate seats. His campaign's top priorities were economic development and education.

In 2006, McCorkell lost the Tulsa mayoral Democratic primary to Kathy Taylor. He spent $1 million self financing his campaign. During the primary he accused Taylor of voter fraud in the 2000 election, however the district attorneys' office did not file charges.

== Later life and death ==
After the 2006 mayoral election, McCorkell travelled to Santa Barbara to visit and eventually moved to the area. There he began making environmental documentaries. His 2008 documentary, Shall We Gather at the River, was critically acclaimed throughout the western United States. McCorkell's wife, Marilyn, died in 2023. He died on March 25, 2025 in Santa Barbara, California.

== Filmography ==
Year	Title	Role	Notes
2008	Shall We Gather at the River	Director	
2009	A River of Waste: The Hazardous Truth About Factory Farms	Director	
