= U.S. Route 177 =

Route 77 Spur

U.S. Route 177
- US-177 highlighted in red

Route information
- Auxiliary route of US 77
- Length: 233 mi (375 km)
- Existed: 1929–present

Major junctions
- South end: US 70 / SH-199 at Madill, OK
- US 270 from Tecumseh to Shawnee, OK; I-40 near Shawnee, OK; US 62 in Jacktown, OK; US 412 / Cimarron Turnpike near Red Rock, OK; US 64 near Morrison, OK; US 60 / US 77 in Ponca City, OK; I-35 in Braman, OK
- North end: US-81 at South Haven, KS

Location
- Country: United States
- States: Oklahoma, Kansas
- Counties: OK: Marshall, Johnston, Carter, Murray, Garvin, McClain, Pontotoc, Pottawatomie, Lincoln, Payne, Noble, Kay; KS: Sumner

Highway system
- United States Numbered Highway System; List; Special; Divided
- Oklahoma State Highway System; Interstate; US; State; Turnpikes
- Kansas State Highway System; Interstate; US; State; Spurs
← SH-171	OK	→ SH-199
← K-176	KS	→ K-177

U.S. Route 177 (US-177) is a spur of U.S. Route 77. It currently runs for 233 miles (375 km) from South Haven, Kansas at US 81 to Madill, Oklahoma at US 70. It passes through the states of Kansas and Oklahoma.

== Route description ==
=== Oklahoma ===
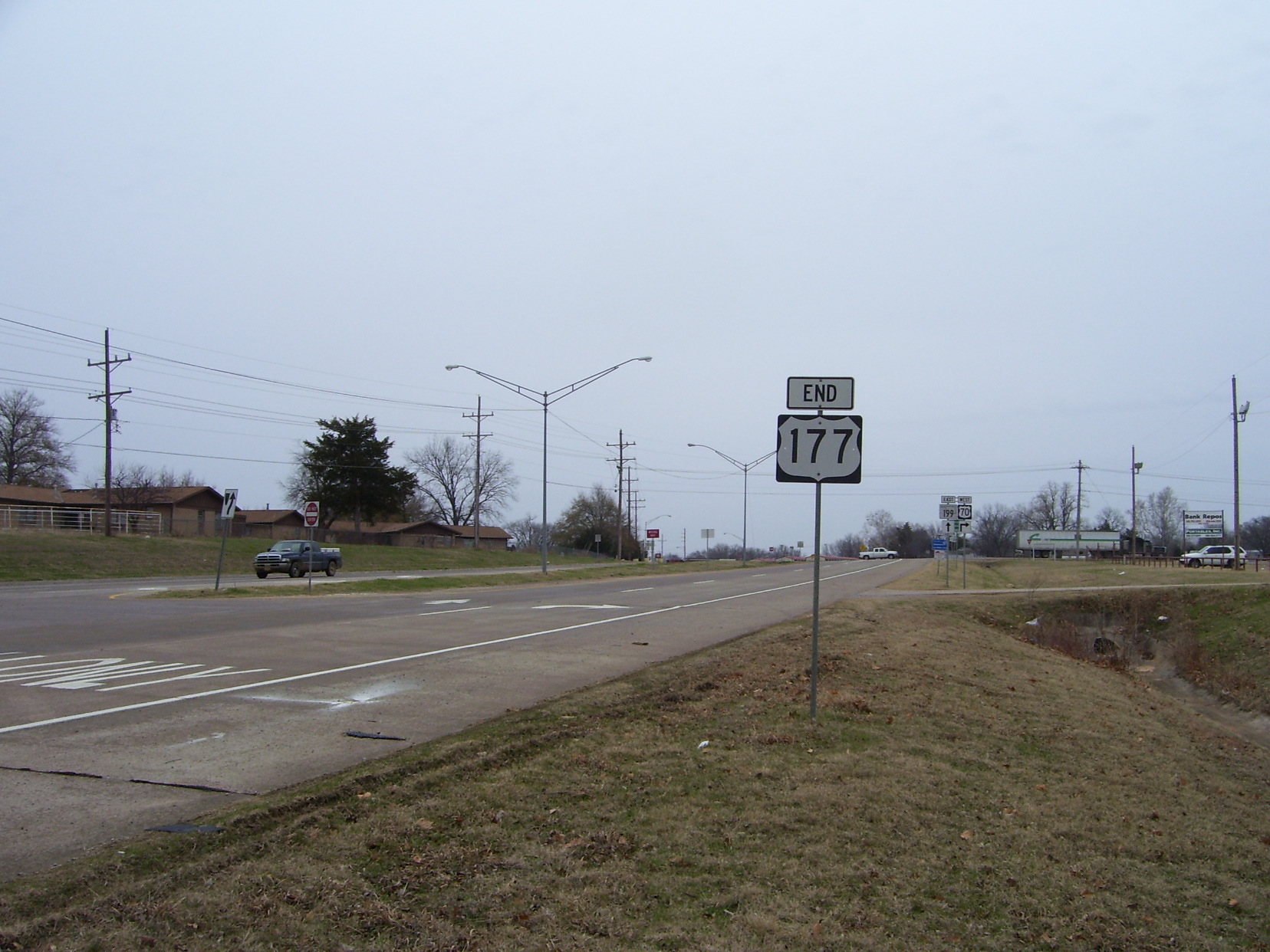
US 177's southern terminus near Madill, Oklahoma

US 177 begins concurrent with State Highway 199 at the US 70 junction near Madill, Oklahoma. From this point, it heads northwest, serving as the southern terminus of State Highway 1 and the main street of Mannsville. The route turns northward in Dickson, where it splits from SH-199. East of Gene Autry, it is the eastern end of SH-53. US 177 then runs through the Chickasaw National Recreation Area and the town of Sulphur, where it has a brief concurrency with SH-7. On the north side of Sulphur lies an interchange with the Chickasaw Turnpike.

US 177 continues north into western Garvin County, serving as the eastern terminus of SH-29 and crossing SH-19 in Stratford. The route then cuts across the narrow eastern tip of McClain County, where it begins concurrencies with both State Highway 59 and State Highway 3W. The three highways then cross the Canadian River into Pottawatomie County, where they meet SH-39 at a four-way stop in Asher.

Near unincorporated Pearson, SH-59 splits off to the east. US 177/SH-3W continue north to Tecumseh, where they have an interchange with SH-9. At this interchange, US 270 joins the concurrency. The three highways run along the west side of Shawnee. At the Interstate 40 interchange, SH-3W reunites with SH-3E, and the unified SH-3 (along with US 270) follows I-40. US 177 continues northward alone.

After crossing into Lincoln County, US 177 meets US 62 in Jacktown. Just west of Warwick, it meets SH-66 (old Route 66), and then passes under Interstate 44 (the Turner Turnpike), with no interchange. I-44 is accessed through the SH-66 – Wellston (Exit 157) interchange. US 177 then continues north, connecting to the town of Carney via SH-40A, the shortest state highway in Oklahoma. West of Tryon, it intersects State Highway 105. It then enters Payne County just south of the Cimarron River.

In Payne County, US 177 almost immediately passes through the town of Perkins. North of that community, it has a one-mile (1.6 km) concurrency with State Highway 33. It then passes through the county seat, Stillwater, the home of Oklahoma State University. There, it intersects SH-51. North of Stillwater, it serves as the western terminus of the Cimarron Turnpike Spur. Farther north, in Noble County, it crosses US 64 and the mainline of the Cimarron Turnpike. It then has a four-mile (6.4 km) concurrency with State Highway 15.

US 177 then enters its final county in Oklahoma, Kay County. It serves Ponca City, where it begins a wrong-way concurrency with its parent, US 77, as well as US 60 (which is signed the "correct" direction). The routes split near Tonkawa. US 177 then runs through Blackwell and Braman. North of Braman, the route is the northernmost exit on Interstate 35 in Oklahoma. Six miles (9.7 km) after the I-35 junction, US 177 leaves Oklahoma.

=== Kansas ===
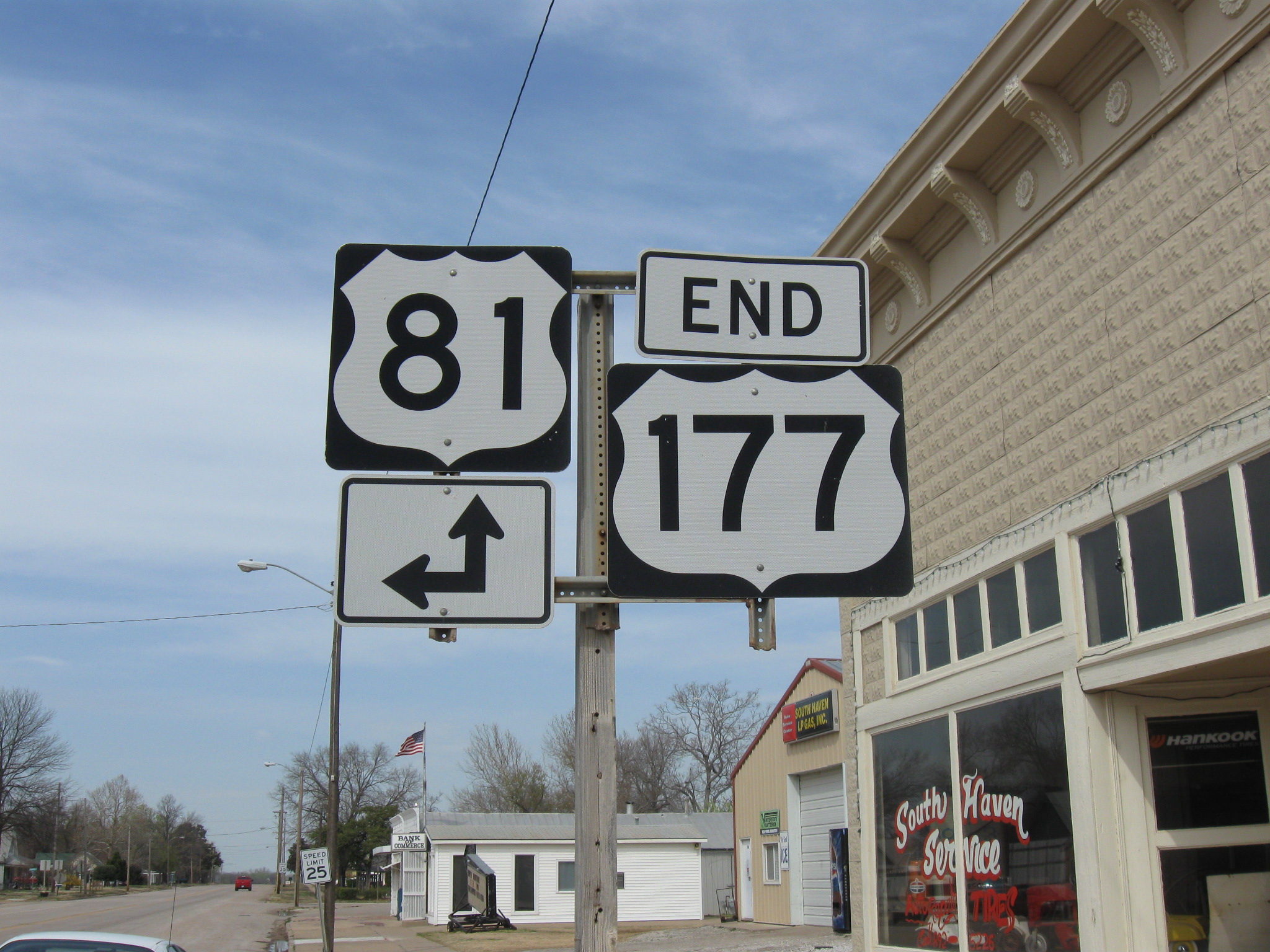
US 177's northern terminus in South Haven, Kansas

US-177 then enters Sumner County, Kansas near Hunnewell. Only 4 mi (6.4 km) north of the state line, US 177 ends at US 81 in downtown South Haven, Kansas. The terminus is less than a mile from the western terminus of US 166 (also on US 81) north of town.

== History ==
Originally, the highway functioned as a shortcut for Wichita to Oklahoma City traffic traveling between US 81 at South Haven, Kansas and US 77 at Three Sands, Oklahoma (where US 77 and State Highway 156 intersect outside Marland, Oklahoma today).

During the 1960s, the highway was extended south to Madill, Oklahoma, replacing the entire length of State Highway 40 from Ponca City, Oklahoma to then-US 66 (near Wellston, Oklahoma) and the portion of State Highway 18 between Shawnee, Oklahoma and Madill, Oklahoma (the segment between US 66 and Shawnee was constructed at this time). Vestiages of these highways remain in spur routes State Highway 40A, located entirely in Carney, Oklahoma and State Highway 18A, located south of Sulphur, Oklahoma.

During this extension, the alignments of US 77 and US 177 were altered in North Central Oklahoma as follows:

US 77 was relocated to run north from Three Sands Jct to Tonkawa, Oklahoma on the former route of US 177, then east on US 60 to Ponca City, Oklahoma. This also involved a new US 60 alignment between Tonkawa, Oklahoma and Ponca City, Oklahoma, where US 60, US 77, and US 177 all overlap on the same highway (which results in northbound US 77, eastbound US 60, and southbound US 177 traffic running in the same compass direction: east).

== Junction list ==
State	County	Location	mi	km	Destinations	Notes
Oklahoma	Marshall	Madill	0.00	0.00	SH-199 east (1st Street) / US 70	Southern terminus; south end of SH-199 overlap; road continues south as US-70/SH-199 east (1st Street)
Oklahoma	Johnston		6.1	9.8	SH-1	Southern terminus of SH-1
Oklahoma	Carter	Dickson	15.2	24.5	SH-199 west	North end of SH-199 overlap
Oklahoma	Carter		22.5	36.2	SH-53	Eastern terminus of SH-53
Oklahoma	Murray	Chickasaw NRA			SH-18A	Western terminus of SH-18A
Oklahoma	Murray	Sulphur	38.1	61.3	SH-7 west (Davis Avenue)	South end of SH-7 overlap
Oklahoma	Murray	Sulphur	38.4	61.8	SH-7 east (Oklahoma Avenue)	North end of SH-7 overlap
Oklahoma	Murray		40.6	65.3	SH-7 Spur west / Chickasaw Turnpike east – Roff, Ada	Eastern terminus of SH-7 Spur, western terminus of Chickasaw Turnpike
Oklahoma	Garvin		48.1	77.4	SH-29	Eastern terminus of SH-29
Oklahoma	Garvin	Stratford	58.2	93.7	SH-19	
Oklahoma	McClain		64.3	103.5	SH-59 south / SH-59A east	Western terminus of SH-59A; south end of SH-59 overlap
Oklahoma	McClain–Pontotoc county line		69.4	111.7	SH-3W south	South end of SH-3W overlap
Oklahoma	Canadian River				Pontotoc–Pottawatomie county line	
Oklahoma	Pottawatomie	Asher	72.0	115.9	SH-39	
Oklahoma	Pottawatomie	Pearson	78.1	125.7	SH-59 north	North end of SH-59 overlap
Oklahoma	Pottawatomie	Chisney	78.1	125.7	SH-59B	Eastern terminus of SH-59B
Oklahoma	Pottawatomie	Tecumseh	91.1	146.6	US 270 east / SH-9 – Tecumseh, Seminole	Interchange; south end of US 270 overlap
Oklahoma	Pottawatomie	Tecumseh			Tecumseh	Interchange
Oklahoma	Pottawatomie	Shawnee	95.5	153.7	US 270 Bus. west / SH-18 north (Farrall Avenue)	Interchange; southern terminus of SH-18
Oklahoma	Pottawatomie	Shawnee	97.1	156.3	US 270 Bus. east (Kickapoo Spur)	Interchange
Oklahoma	Pottawatomie		101.0	162.5	I-40 / SH-3E east – Okemah I-40 / US 270 / SH-3 west / SH-3W end – Oklahoma City	I-40 exit 181; north end of US-270/SH-3W overlap; SH-3W west and SH-3E merge into SH-3
Oklahoma	Pottawatomie		102.0	164.2	SH-270	Eastern terminus of SH-270
Oklahoma	Lincoln	Jacktown	110.0	177.0	US 62	
Oklahoma	Lincoln	Warwick	122.4	197.0	SH-66 to I-44 (Turner Turnpike) – Oklahoma City, Tulsa	Former US 66
Oklahoma	Lincoln	Carney	131.2	211.1	SH-40A	Western terminus of SH-40A
Oklahoma	Lincoln		135.5	218.1	SH-105	
Oklahoma	Payne	Perkins	144.0	231.7	SH-33 east	South end of SH-33 overlap
Oklahoma	Payne	Perkins	145.0	233.4	SH-33 west	North end of SH-33 overlap
Oklahoma	Payne	Stillwater	154.1	248.0	SH-51	
Oklahoma	Payne		159.7	257.0	To US 412 east / Cimarron Turnpike Spur – Tulsa	Cimarron Tpk. Spur exit 20A; western terminus of Cimarron Tpk. Spur
Oklahoma	Noble		166.4	267.8	US 64	
Oklahoma	Noble		172.8	278.1	US 412 / Cimarron Turnpike – Tulsa, Enid	Figure-8 interchange; US 412/Cimarron Tpk. exit 15
Oklahoma	Noble		174.3	280.5	SH-15 east	South end of SH-15 overlap
Oklahoma	Noble		178.4	287.1	SH-15 west	North end of SH-15 overlap
Oklahoma	Kay	Ponca City	193.5	311.4	US 60 east (Harding Road east) / US 77 north / US 60 Bus. west (Dr. Martin Luther King Jr. Memorial Parkway)	East end of US-60/US-77 overlap; eastern terminus of US-60 Bus.
Oklahoma	Kay		196.4	316.1	US 60 Bus. east – Ponca City	Interchange; southbound left exit and northbound entrance; western terminus of US-60 Bus.
Oklahoma	Kay		197.1	317.2	SH-156 south – Marland	Interchange; northern terminus of SH-156
Oklahoma	Kay		204.9	329.8	US 60 Bus. west (Main Street) / US 60 west / US 77 south – Tonkawa	Interchange; west end of US-60/US-77 overlap
Oklahoma	Kay	Blackwell	213.6	343.8	SH-11	
Oklahoma	Kay	Braman	223.9	360.3	I-35 – Wichita, Blackwell	I-35 exit 231
			229.4 0.000	369.2 0.000	Oklahoma–Kansas line	
Kansas	Sumner	South Haven	3.510	5.649	US-81	Northern terminus; road continues as US-81 north (Main Street)
1.000 mi = 1.609 km; 1.000 km = 0.621 mi: Concurrency terminus; Incomplete access; Tolled

== State Highway 40A ==
State Highway 40A
- Location: Carney, Oklahoma
- Length: 0.35 mi (560 m)

State Highway 40A is an 0.35-mile (0.56 km) highway in Lincoln County, Oklahoma. It is numbered after State Highway 40, the predecessor to US-177. It is the shortest state highway in Oklahoma.

The highway connects US-177 to the town of Carney, Oklahoma. It has a 25 mph (40 km/h) speed limit.

== See also ==
=== Related routes ===
- U.S. Route 77
- U.S. Route 277
- U.S. Route 377

Browse numbered routes
← SH-171	OK	→ US 183
← K-175	KS	→ K-177
