= Dave Lopez =

American politician (born 1951)

33rd Secretary of State of Oklahoma
- In office March 27, 2017 – March 30, 2018
- Governor: Mary Fallin
- Preceded by: Michael J. Hunter
- Succeeded by: Jim Williamson

Secretary of Commerce of Oklahoma
- In office July 16, 2013 – August 30, 2013
- Governor: Mary Fallin
- Preceded by: Himself (Commerce and Tourism)
- Succeeded by: Larry Parman

Secretary of Commerce and Tourism of Oklahoma
- In office January 27, 2011 – July 16, 2013
- Governor: Mary Fallin
- Preceded by: Natalie Shirley
- Succeeded by: Himself (Commerce); Deby Snodgrass (Tourism)

Director of the Oklahoma Department of Commerce
- In office January 27, 2011 – December 1, 2012
- Governor: Mary Fallin
- Preceded by: Natalie Shirley
- Succeeded by: Jonna Kirschner

Personal details
- Born: June 3, 1951 (age 74) Las Cruces, New Mexico, U.S.
- Party: Independent
- Education: New Mexico State University, Las Cruces (BA, MA)

David Lopez (born June 3, 1951) is a former American telecommunications executive who served as the Oklahoma Secretary of State after having previously served as the Oklahoma Secretary of Commerce under Republican Governor of Oklahoma Mary Fallin.

In March, 2017, Governor Fallin appointed Lopez as Secretary of State and he was confirmed by the Oklahoma Senate in May, 2017. In January, 2018, Lopez' duties were expanded and his title was changed to Secretary of State, Education and Workforce Development. He retained that title until resigning effective March 30, 2018.

Governor Fallin had previously named Lopez to serve as her Oklahoma Secretary of Commerce and Tourism in January, 2011. Lopez was appointed to serve in the dual role of both the Secretary of Commerce and Tourism as well as the Executive Director of the Department of Commerce. In 2013, Lopez's position was reorganized by separating Commerce agencies from Tourism agencies, retitling his position to simply "Secretary of Commerce".

Lopez resigned as Secretary of Commerce on August 26, 2013 effective August 30, 2013 after being named as the interim Superintendent of Schools for the Oklahoma City Public School District, succeeding Karl Springer.

== Biography ==
Lopez currently serves on the Board of Directors for BancFirst Corporation and for Hall Capital. Previous corporate boards on which Lopez has served include BOK Financial, American Fidelity Corporation and ITC Holdings. Non-profit boards on which Lopez serves are the Greater Oklahoma City Chamber of Commerce, the Uncommon Ground Sculpture Park and the Oklahoma City Committee on Foreign Relations.

Lopez received a bachelor's degree and a master's degree from New Mexico State University where he also served as Sports Information Director for five years. He had a 22-year career with SBC Communications, eventually rising to the position of President for the Oklahoma and completed his career as President of Texas for SBC, the predecessor company to AT&T. After retiring from SBC, he returned to Oklahoma where resumed his professional career as President of Downtown Oklahoma City Inc., (a non-profit corporation aimed at revitalizing Oklahoma City's downtown) and he later served as President of American Fidelity Foundation (a non-profit corporation in Oklahoma City that gives grants for economic development, education, human services, and art).

Lopez, a long-time advocate of public education, has served on the board of regents for the Texas Tech University System and on the board of trustees for Oklahoma City Community College. Honors accorded Lopez include the Dean A. McGee Award (by Downtown Oklahoma City Inc.), the Key Contributor Award (by the Oklahoma Academy for State Goals) and the Champion of Youth Award (by the Boys and Girls Club of Central Oklahoma). He was inducted into Oklahoma City University’s Commerce and Industry Hall of Honor, Oklahoma Christian University presented Lopez with an honorary Doctor of Humanities Degree and Lopez was inducted into the New Mexico State University Athletics Hall of Fame.

== Personal life ==
Lopez and his wife, Lana, reside in Oklahoma City and have five children and eight grandchildren.

Political offices
Preceded by Tod Wall; Acting	Secretary of State of Oklahoma; 2017–2018	Succeeded by Jim Williamson
