= Allen Williamson Bridge =

- Coordinates: 36.0277°N 96.9078°W
- Carries: Road traffic
- Crosses: Cimarron River
- Locale: Ripley, Oklahoma

Characteristics
- Material: Concrete

History
- Inaugurated: December 31, 1974

Allen Williamson Bridge is the name of a memorial bridge in Payne County, Oklahoma, named after a former State Representative who served in the Oklahoma State House of Representatives from 1966 - 1974. This politician should not be confused with a similarly named Oklahoma State Senator. The bridge carries Oklahoma State Highway 108 over the Cimarron River just north of the town of Ripley and 2.5 miles (4.0 km) north of Oklahoma State Highway 33. It is accompanied by a monument on one end of the structure and a memorial plaque placed by the Cimarron Valley Historical Society. The bridge was dedicated on December 31, 1974. The location is marked by steep rust-colored hills overlooking the Cimarron River, populated by a medium coverage of trees and other foliage. The bridge is of moderate size and of concrete construction, serving as a conduit for a two-lane highway.
