= Oklahoma State Highway 105 =

State highway in Oklahoma, United States

State Highway 105
- SH 105 highlighted in red

Route information
- Maintained by ODOT
- Length: 29.11 mi (46.85 km)
- Existed: January 26, 1955–present

Major junctions
- West end: SH-33 east of Guthrie
- US 177 near Tryon
- East end: SH-18 south of Agra

Location
- Country: United States
- State: Oklahoma

Highway system
- Oklahoma State Highway System; Interstate; US; State; Turnpikes
← SH-104	→ SH-108

State Highway 105 (abbreviated SH-105) is a state highway in the north-central part of the U.S. state of Oklahoma. It runs for 29.11 miles (46.85 km) across Logan and Lincoln Counties. It has no lettered spur routes.

SH-105 was formed over the course of 1955. The eastern half of the road was added to the state highway system first, in January of that year, followed by the western half, added in June.

== Route description ==
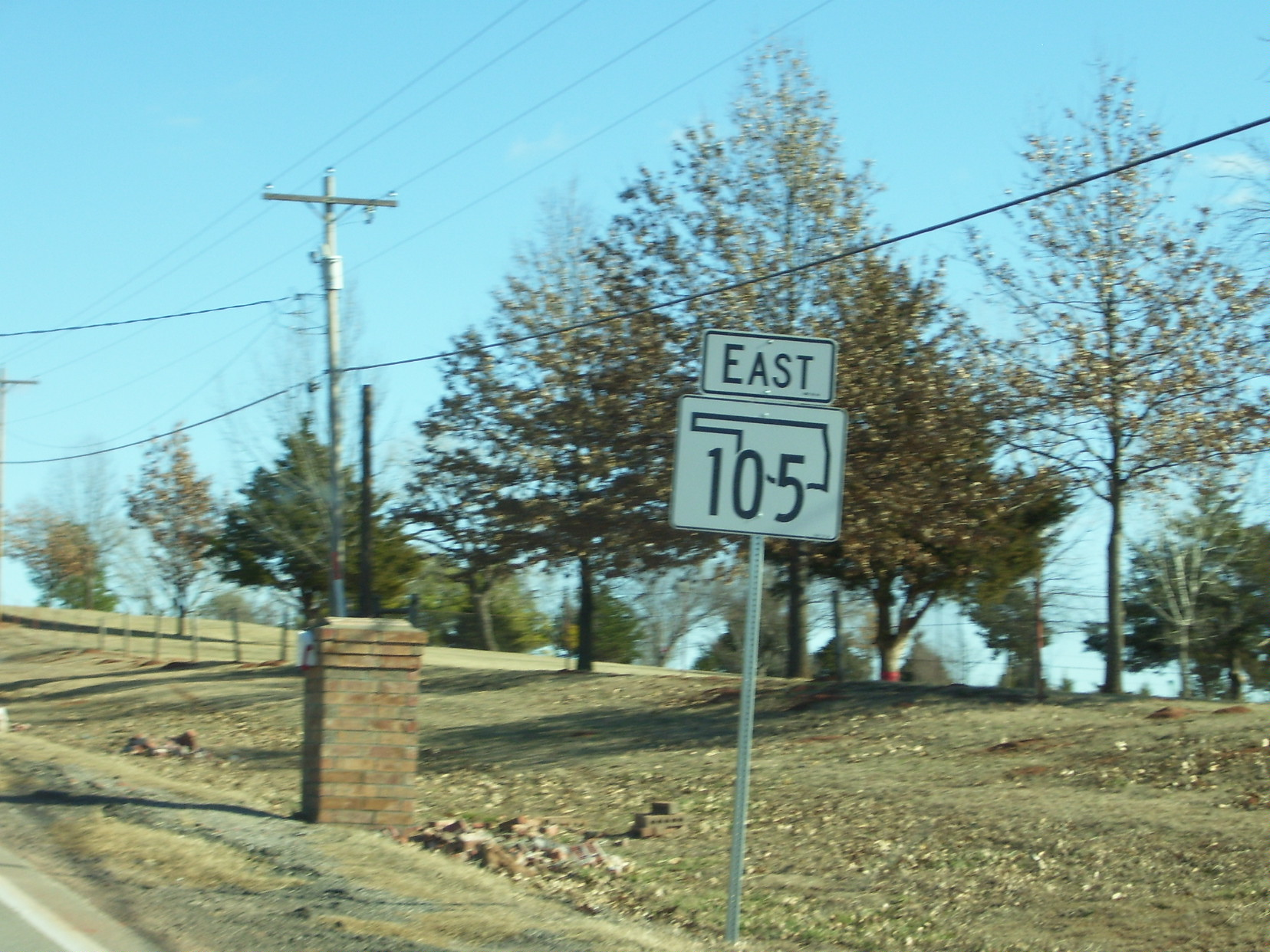
SH-105 shield just after the highway's beginning east of Guthrie

The highway begins at State Highway 33 just east of Guthrie, just east of Interstate 35. It heads due east from here, passing just north of the northernmost tip of Country Club Lake. Just after this lake, the highway turns southeast, then back to the east, bringing it onto the section line that it will follow for the remainder of its route. The highway crosses the Indian Meridian north of the town of Meridian. The highway continues east, crossing from Logan into Lincoln County.

At the unincorporated place of Four Corners, the highway intersects US-177 north of Carney, its first highway junction in 21 miles (34 km). Three miles (4.8 km) later it runs through the small town of Tryon. Five miles (8 km) later it ends at State Highway 18, two miles (3.2 km) south of Agra.

== History ==
SH-105 was first commissioned on January 26, 1955. At this time, the highway began at SH-40 (present-day US-177) west of Tryon, and ended at SH-18 south of Agra. The highway was extended west to its current western terminus east of Guthrie on June 4, 1955. The highway has no further alterations to its extent since.

SH-105 was originally gravel-surfaced. By 1959, the eastern half of the highway had been paved. The western half of the highway was not shown on the official state map at all until the 1981 edition, which showed it as paved.

== Junction list ==
County	Location	mi	km	Destinations	Notes
Logan		0.00	0.00	SH-33	Western terminus
Lincoln	Four Corners	21.14	34.02	US 177	
Lincoln		29.11	46.85	SH-18	Eastern terminus
1.000 mi = 1.609 km; 1.000 km = 0.621 mi
