= Cimarron Turnpike =

Toll road in Oklahoma, US

Cimarron Turnpike
- Cimarron Turnpike highlighted in red

Route information
- Maintained by Oklahoma Turnpike Authority
- Length: 59.2 mi (95.3 km)
- Existed: May 16, 1975–present
- Component highways: Future I-42 / US 412 Toll entire length

Major junctions
- West end: I-35 / US 64 / US 412 near Perry
- US 77 near Perry; US 177 in Noble County
- East end: Future I-42 / US 64 / US 412 / SH-48 in Westport

Location
- Country: United States
- State: Oklahoma
- Counties: Noble, Pawnee, Payne

Highway system
- Oklahoma State Highway System; Interstate; US; State; Turnpikes

The Cimarron Turnpike is a controlled-access toll road in north-central Oklahoma. The route travels 67 miles (108 km) from an interchange with Interstate 35 (I-35) north of Perry to Westport just west of Tulsa. The route also consists of a 7.2-mile (11.6 km) spur which runs from the mainline southwest to an interchange with U.S. Route 177 (US 177) north of Stillwater.

The entirety of the Cimarron Turnpike is concurrent with US 412 except for the Stillwater spur. At either end of the Turnpike, US 412 begins (or ends, depending on direction) a concurrency with US 64.

The Cimarron Turnpike opened to traffic in 1975. The US 412 designation was applied to the Cimarron Turnpike in 1988.

== Route description ==
The Cimarron Turnpike, carrying US 412, passes through Noble, Payne and Pawnee Counties. The highway heads east from I-35 to its first interchange, Exit 2, which has limited access. There is no eastbound exit ramp to US 77, only an on ramp. Westbound, there is only an off ramp to US 77. The first mainline toll plaza is just west of Exit 15, a cloverleaf interchange with no straight-line ramps (forcing all traffic getting on or off to pass through the toll gantry) connecting the turnpike to US 177. East of the US 177 interchange, the highway curves to the south, crossing Black Bear Creek. US 412 then meets US 64 once again, interchanging with it at Exit 23 east of Morrison. The turnpike then turns back east with a spur route (accessible only from the westbound turnpike) branching off to the southwest toward Stillwater. The Lone Chimney service plaza, a twenty-four-hour concession area, is located in the median of the turnpike east of the interchange with the spur.

South of Pawnee lies an interchange (Exit 37) with SH-18. Just south of Hallett, a second mainline toll plaza sits just west of the SH-99 interchange; again, this interchange is a cloverleaf interchange with only loop ramps. The turnpike's final exit is Exit 60, a partial interchange with SH-48 southeast of Cleveland. The missing movements are provided by US 64, the northern terminus of SH-48, which merges with US 412 as the Cimarron Turnpike ends. The two routes continue east as the Keystone Expressway, a freeway that connects the turnpike to downtown Tulsa.

== History ==
The Cimarron Turnpike opened to traffic on May 16, 1975, and cost $74 million to construct. On February 1, 1988, the Oklahoma Transportation Commission unanimously approved an extension of US-412 from its original western terminus at Walnut Ridge, Arkansas to Woodward, overlapping the Cimarron Turnpike.

== Tolls ==
As of 2022, passengers of two-axle vehicles (such as cars and motorcycles) pay a total of $7.45 to travel the entire length of the Cimarron Turnpike. Tolls vary based on the entrance and exit used. The turnpike accepts OTA's Pikepass transponder system as an alternative to PlatePay payment. Pikepass customers receive discounted toll rates; the Pikepass rate for the full length of the Cimarron is $3.30.

On August 30, 2022, the SH 99 toll plaza at exit 48 had been converted to cashless tolling with PikePass or PlatePay as options. The rest of the turnpike (including the Spur) had been converted to PlatePay on December 15, 2022.

Toll revenues from the Cimarron Turnpike are not necessarily used to maintain it. Under a practice known as cross-pledging, all OTA toll revenue is pledged against the sum of OTA's indebtedness, including bonds financing the state's other turnpikes.

== Services ==
Law enforcement along the Cimarron Turnpike is provided by Oklahoma Highway Patrol Troop YA, a special troop assigned to the turnpike.

== Future ==
Future Interstate 42
- Location: Noble County – Arkansas state line
- Length: 174 mi (280 km)

On May 20, 2021, the late Senator Jim Inhofe, Republican of Oklahoma, introduced legislation to designate the portion of US 412 between I-35 in Noble County and I-49 in Springdale, Arkansas as future Interstate 42. (I-42) The bill, titled the "Future Interstate in Oklahoma and Arkansas Act" (S. 1766), was cosponsored by senators John Boozman and Tom Cotton, both Republicans of Arkansas. The senators' stated reasons for seeking an Interstate designation along the US 412 included encouraging economic development, expanding opportunities for employment in the region, making travel safer and shipping easier, attracting new businesses, and better connecting rural and urban communities. Other supporters of the measure include the former mayor of Tulsa, G. T. Bynum, and the heads of both ODOT and the Arkansas Department of Transportation (ArDOT). The language of the bill was later included in the Infrastructure Investment and Jobs Act (H.R. 3684). Interstate 42 (I-42) was the proposed designation but was withdrawn. ArDOT and ODOT later resubmitted the application to the Spring 2024 meeting; AASHTO approved the route as Interstate 42, conditional on it being upgraded to Interstate standards.

== Exit list ==
County	Location	mi	km	Exit	Destinations	Notes
Noble		0.00	0.00		US 64 west / US 412 west – Enid	Western end of Cimarron Turnpike and toll road
Noble		0.00	0.00	1	I-35 / US 64 east – Wichita, Perry, Oklahoma City	Signed as exits 1A (north) and 1B (south) westbound; no exit number eastbound; last free exit eastbound; future western terminus of I-42; I-35 exit 194
Noble		2.7	4.3	2	US 77 – Tonkawa, Perry	Westbound exit and eastbound entrance
Noble		14.2	22.9	Toll gantry		
Noble		14.7	23.7	15	US 177 – Ponca City, Stillwater	
Noble		15.1	24.3	Toll gantry		
Pawnee	No major junctions					
Noble		22.8	36.7	22	US 64 – Morrison, Pawnee	Tolled westbound exit and eastbound entrance
Payne		27.7	44.6	27	SH-312 west – Stillwater	Westbound exit and eastbound entrance; eastern terminus of SH-312
Payne		28.5	45.9	28	SH-108	Proposed interchange
Pawnee		36.0	57.9	36	Lone Chimney Service Plaza	Left exits and entrances
Pawnee		36.7	59.1	37	SH-18 – Pawnee, Cushing	
Pawnee		47.9	77.1	Toll gantry		
Pawnee		48.4	77.9	48	SH-99 – Hallett, Jennings	
Pawnee		48.9	78.7	Toll gantry		
Pawnee	Westport	58.6	94.3	59	SH-48 to US 64 – Cleveland, Mannford	Eastbound exit and westbound entrance
Pawnee	Westport	59.2	95.3		US 64 west to SH-48 south – Cleveland, Bristow, Pawnee	Westbound exit and eastbound entrance; last free exit westbound
Pawnee	Westport	59.2	95.3		Future I-42 east / US 64 east / US 412 east (Sand Springs Expressway)	Eastern end of Cimarron Turnpike and toll road; eastern end of US 412 concurrency
1.000 mi = 1.609 km; 1.000 km = 0.621 mi: Concurrency terminus; Electronic toll collection; Incomplete access; Unopened

== State Highway 312 ==
State Highway 312
- Location: Payne County
- Length: 8.5 mi (13.7 km)
- Existed: August 2, 2021–present

State Highway 312 is an 8.5-mile-long (13.7 km) spur from the Cimarron Turnpike that splits from the main turnpike at exit 27. There is one main lane toll plaza near Perkins Road that costs anywhere between $0.45 (for 2-axle vehicles with a Pikepass) to $2.50 (6-axle vehicles without a Pikepass). The spur's western terminus is at a trumpet interchange with US 177 in northern Stillwater, near Oklahoma State University. There is an incomplete access exit at Perkins Road (signed as exit 21A) and the spur starts to travel through rural areas of northern Payne County before ending at the main turnpike. The spur was built in 1981 at the cost of $4.5 million. The spur was built as a way for westbound traffic to get to Stillwater and the main campus of Oklahoma State University. Conversely, eastbound traffic uses the spur for faster access to Tulsa from Stillwater.

SH-312 originally bore no numbered designation. On August 2, 2021, the Oklahoma Transportation Commission unanimously approved a motion to apply the SH-312 designation to the turnpike. ODOT Director Tim Gatz stated in the Transportation Commission meeting that the numbering addition was primarily to aid in navigation using digital mapping and routing applications.

The entire route is in Payne County.

Location	mi	km	Exit	Destinations	Notes
Stillwater	0.00	0.00	20A	US 177 – Perkins, Ponca City	Western terminus
	0.7	1.1	21A	Perkins Road	Westbound exit and eastbound entrance
	1.3	2.1	Toll gantry		
	8.5	13.7		Future I-42 east / US 412 Toll east / Cimarron Turnpike east – Tulsa	Eastern terminus; exit 27 on US 412 / Turnpike
1.000 mi = 1.609 km; 1.000 km = 0.621 mi: Electronic toll collection; Incomplete access

== See also ==
- Oklahoma Turnpike Authority
- Pikepass
