= James Allen Williamson =

American politician

Jim Williamson

Secretary of State of Oklahoma
- In office June 1, 2018 – January 14, 2019
- Governor: Mary Fallin
- Preceded by: Dave Lopez
- Succeeded by: Michael Rogers

Minority Leader of the Oklahoma Senate
- In office 2003–2004
- Succeeded by: Glenn Coffee

Member of the Oklahoma Senate from the 35th district
- In office 1996–2008
- Preceded by: Don Rubottom
- Succeeded by: Gary Stanislawski

Member of the Oklahoma House of Representatives from the 76th district
- In office 1980–1986
- Preceded by: Jerry L. Smith
- Succeeded by: Richard Williamson

Personal details
- Born: James Williamson; May 27, 1951 (age 75) Fort Riley, Kansas, U.S.
- Party: Republican
- Spouse: Sandra
- Education: University of Tulsa (BA, JD)

James Allen Williamson (born May 27, 1951) is an American attorney and Republican politician from the U.S. state of Oklahoma. Williamson served in the Oklahoma House of Representatives from 1980 to 1986 and in the Oklahoma Senate from 1996 to 2008. From 1998 to 2002 he served as Assistant Republican Floor Leader, and then as Floor Leader from 2003 to 2004.

He is currently serving on President pro tempore of the Oklahoma Senate Brian Bingman's leadership staff as senior policy advisor and legal counsel.

== Early life and career ==
Williamson was born May 27, 1951, in Fort Riley, Kansas. After earning a Bachelor of Science in Education and a Juris Doctor from the University of Tulsa, Williamson taught social studies prior to embarking on a law career.

== Political career ==
During his political career, he served in various positions. From 1980 through 1986, he represented House District 76 (the southeast part of Tulsa and Broken Arrow).

From 1982 to 1986 he served as Assistant House Republican Floor Leader before being elected (in 1996) to the Senate, representing Senate District 35 (the south central part of Tulsa and Jenks).

From 1998 to 2002 he served as Assistant Senate Republican Leader, and then as Senate Republican Leader beginning in 2003 until 2004.

In 2006, Williamson ran for Governor of Oklahoma but was defeated in the primary. During the 2007 session, Williamson was the lead sponsor of three major pieces of legislation: a bill banning state funds from being used at state facilities for the promotion or use in abortions, an immigration reform bill, and a lawsuit reform bill. All eventually became law except the lawsuit reform bill, which was vetoed.

Williamson authored Oklahoma's ban on gay marriage.

== Later life ==
Williamson was hired to serve on President pro tempore of the Oklahoma Senate Brian Bingman's leadership staff as senior policy advisor and legal counsel in 2010.

== Notable relatives ==
He is related to former State Representative Allen Williamson, who served in the House from 1966 to 1974 and was honored with the dedication of a bridge named after him in Payne County.

Political offices
Preceded by Dave Lopez	Secretary of State of Oklahoma; 2018–2019	Succeeded by Michael Rogers
