= Chris Banning =

American politician

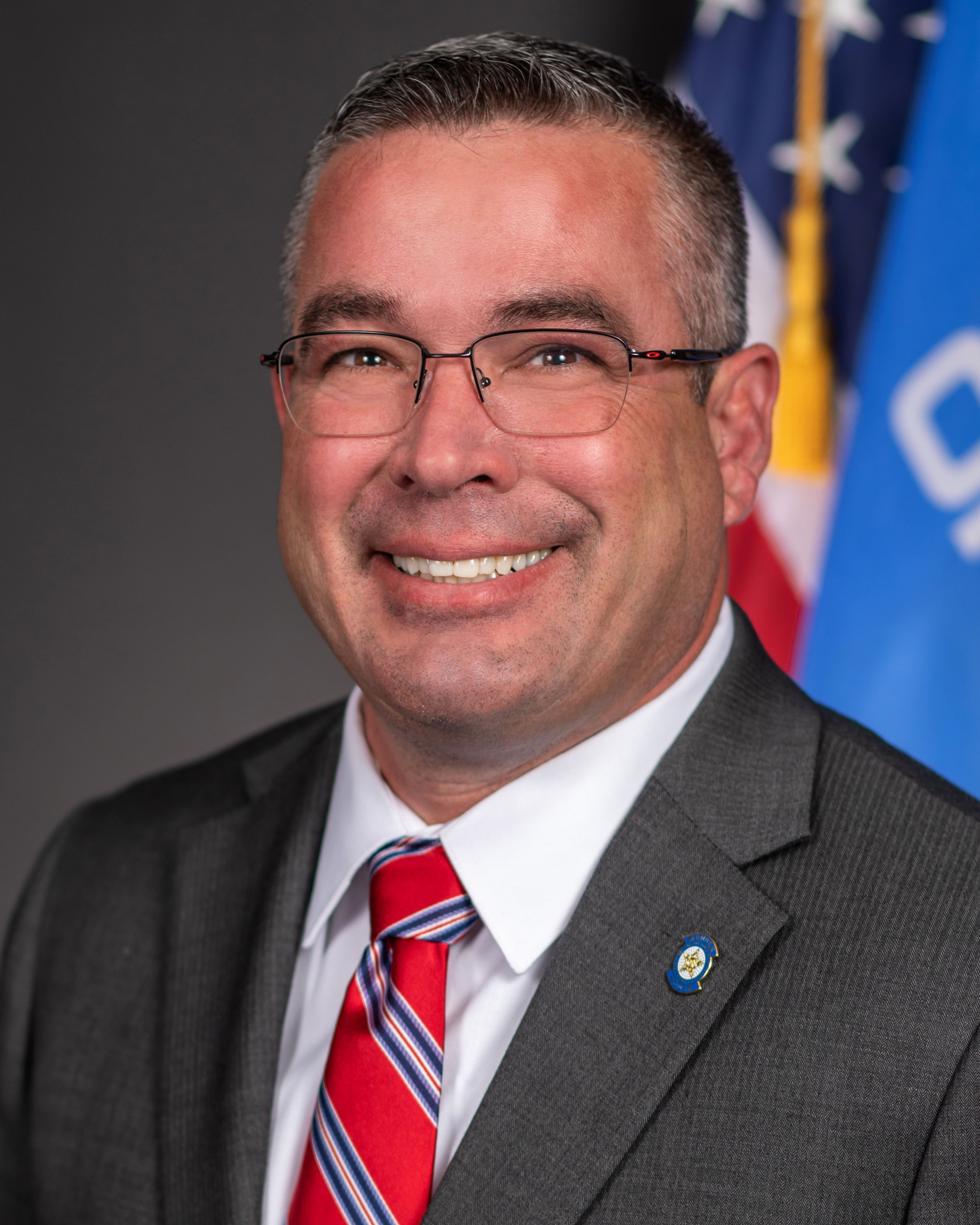
- Official Portrait, 2022

Member of the Oklahoma House of Representatives from the 24th district
- Incumbent
- Assumed office November 16, 2022
- Preceded by: Logan Phillips

Personal details
- Born: 1975 or 1976 (age 49–50)
- Party: Republican

Military service
- Branch/service: United States Air Force
- Battles/wars: Operation Provide Comfort

Chris Banning is an American politician who has served as the Oklahoma House of Representatives member from the 24th district since November 16, 2022.

== Career ==
Banning joined the United States Air Force in 1993 as an Airman Basic. He participated in Operation Provide Comfort between December 13, 1993, and January 12, 1997. He also provided volunteer relief at Tinker Air Force Base during the Oklahoma City bombing.

Banning is the CEO of Banning Investment Group.

== Oklahoma House of Representatives ==
Banning challenged incumbent Representative Logan Phillips in the 2022 Republican primary, along with another candidate, Bobby Schultz. Banning was endorsed by Governor Kevin Stitt and Americans for Prosperity. Banning won the June Republican primary. Since no non-Republican candidate filled, there was no November general election. He was sworn in November 16, 2022. In 2024, he applauded superintendent Ryan Walter's attempts to reject the American Library Association's standards for information literacy. Walters had called the current standards "woke and inappropriate for our youth”. The ALA, which works with the Oklahoma Library Association and the American Association of School Librarians, said it "remains focused on ensuring that our current information literacy standards meet academic rigor and that we continue to strive to make Oklahoma a top 10 state in literacy."

== Personal life ==
Banning and his wife, Katy, have six children. He and his family live in Bixby, Oklahoma.
