= Tryon, Oklahoma =

Tryon, Oklahoma Ahéri Chína^iñe
- Town
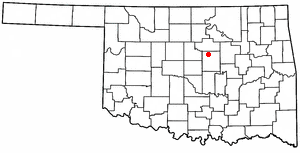
- Location of Tryon, Oklahoma
- Coordinates: 35°52′21″N 96°57′58″W
- Country: United States
- State: Oklahoma
- County: Lincoln

Area
  - Total: 2.10 sq mi (5.44 km^{2})
  - Land: 2.09 sq mi (5.42 km^{2})
  - Water: 0.0077 sq mi (0.02 km^{2})
- Elevation: 994 ft (303 m)

Population (2020)
  - Total: 378
  - Density: 180.7/sq mi (69.77/km^{2})
- Time zone: UTC-6 (Central (CST))
  - Summer (DST): UTC-5 (CDT)
- ZIP code: 74875
- Area codes: 539/918
- FIPS code: 40-74550
- GNIS feature ID: 2413404
- Website: https://townoftryon.com/

Tryon (Iowa-Oto: Ahéri Chína^iñe, meaning: "On-hill town little") is a town in Lincoln County, Oklahoma, United States. As of the 2020 census, Tryon had a population of 378. The community is named after early land owner Fred S. Tryon.

== Geography ==
According to the United States Census Bureau, the town has a total area of 2.3 square miles (6.0 km^{2}), of which 2.3 square miles (6.0 km^{2}) is land and 0.43% is water.

Tryon is located on State Highway 105, east of U.S. Route 177.

== Demographics ==
Historical population
Census	Pop.	Note	%±
1910	176		—
1920	225		27.8%
1930	299		32.9%
1940	279		−6.7%
1950	285		2.2%
1960	254		−10.9%
1970	301		18.5%
1980	435		44.5%
1990	514		18.2%
2000	273		−46.9%
2010	491		79.9%
2020	378		−23.0%
U.S. Decennial Census

=== 2020 census ===
As of the 2020 census, Tryon had a population of 378. The median age was 38.8 years. 26.7% of residents were under the age of 18 and 16.7% of residents were 65 years of age or older. For every 100 females there were 103.2 males, and for every 100 females age 18 and over there were 97.9 males age 18 and over.

0.0% of residents lived in urban areas, while 100.0% lived in rural areas.

There were 152 households in Tryon, of which 38.2% had children under the age of 18 living in them. Of all households, 44.7% were married-couple households, 23.0% were households with a male householder and no spouse or partner present, and 22.4% were households with a female householder and no spouse or partner present. About 24.3% of all households were made up of individuals and 9.2% had someone living alone who was 65 years of age or older.

There were 170 housing units, of which 10.6% were vacant. The homeowner vacancy rate was 0.0% and the rental vacancy rate was 7.1%.

Racial composition as of the 2020 census
Race	Number	Percent
White	276	73.0%
Black or African American	2	0.5%
American Indian and Alaska Native	63	16.7%
Asian	0	0.0%
Native Hawaiian and Other Pacific Islander	0	0.0%
Some other race	5	1.3%
Two or more races	32	8.5%
Hispanic or Latino (of any race)	6	1.6%

=== 2000 census ===
At the 2000 census there were 448 people, 185 households, and 118 families living in the town. The population density was 194.7 inhabitants per square mile (75.2/km^{2}). There were 229 housing units at an average density of 99.5 per square mile (38.4/km^{2}). The racial makeup of the town was 82.81% White, 13.62% Native American, 1.12% from other races, and 2.46% from two or more races. Hispanic or Latino of any race were 2.01%.

Of the 185 households 29.2% had children under the age of 18 living with them, 48.1% were married couples living together, 9.7% had a female householder with no husband present, and 36.2% were non-families. 33.0% of households were one person and 16.2% were one person aged 65 or older. The average household size was 2.42 and the average family size was 3.08.

The age distribution was 25.4% under the age of 18, 10.7% from 18 to 24, 25.0% from 25 to 44, 24.3% from 45 to 64, and 14.5% 65 or older. The median age was 38 years. For every 100 females, there were 99.1 males. For every 100 females age 18 and over, there were 100.0 males.

The median household income was $21,696 and the median family income was $27,361. Males had a median income of $28,382 versus $18,125 for females. The per capita income for the town was $10,730. About 12.8% of families and 14.1% of the population were below the poverty line, including 15.4% of those under age 18 and 10.5% of those age 65 or over.
