= Kathy Taylor (politician) =

American politician (born 1955)

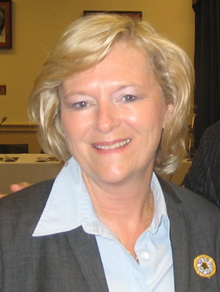
- Taylor in 2005

38th Mayor of Tulsa
- In office April 10, 2006 – December 6, 2009
- Preceded by: Bill LaFortune
- Succeeded by: Dewey Bartlett

Oklahoma Secretary of Commerce
- In office 2003–2006
- Governor: Brad Henry
- Preceded by: Russell M. Perry (Note: The office was vacant from 2001 to 2003.)
- Succeeded by: Natalie Shirley

Personal details
- Born: September 29, 1955 (age 71)
- Party: Democratic
- Spouse: Bill Lobeck
- Education: University of Oklahoma

Kathryn Louise Taylor (born September 29, 1955) is an American attorney, businesswoman, and politician who served as the 38th mayor of Tulsa, Oklahoma from 2006 to 2009. She previously served as the Oklahoma Secretary of Commerce in the administration of Governor Brad Henry, appointed by him in 2003.

A native of Oklahoma City, Taylor attended law school at the University of Oklahoma and married Bill Lobeck. She worked as an attorney before working as the vice president for Thrifty Car Rental. She later bought the company with her husband and the couple founded the Lobeck Taylor Foundation.

In 2006, Taylor was the Democratic nominee for Mayor of Tulsa. She defeated Republican incumbent Bill LaFortune to become Tulsa's second female mayor and did not run for reelection in 2009. After leaving the mayor's office, she again served in the Henry administration and in 2011 she was inducted into the Oklahoma Women's Hall of Fame. In 2013, she again campaigned for mayor, but lost the runoff election to Dewey F. Bartlett Jr.

She served as the dean for the University of Tulsa's Collins College of Business from 2021 to 2024.

== Early life and education ==
Kathryn Taylor grew up in Oklahoma City, Oklahoma and graduated from John Marshall High School. She then earned a bachelor's degree and Juris Doctor from the University of Oklahoma.

Taylor worked as an attorney at a private firm before moving to Tulsa to become the vice president and general counsel of Thrifty Car Rental. Taylor and her husband Bill Lobeck eventually bought Thrifty Car Rental, sold the company, and founded the Lobeck Taylor Foundation.

== Political career ==
Taylor was appointed in 2003 by Governor Brad Henry to serve as the Oklahoma Secretary of Commerce, Tourism, and Workforce Development.

=== Mayor of Tulsa ===
Taylor was elected the 38th mayor of Tulsa on April 4, 2006.

As Mayor, Taylor oversaw the completion of Tulsa's "Vision 2025" projects including the development of the BOK Center. Taylor also pushed a $450 million street bond issue and the construction of ONEOK Field.

On June 4, 2009, Taylor announced that she would not seek re-election. On September 30, 2009, Oklahoma Governor Brad Henry announced that Taylor would become his top education adviser after her term as mayor ended on December 7.

=== Post-mayoral career ===
Upon exiting the office of Mayor of Tulsa, Taylor served as Chief of Education Strategy and Innovation in the cabinet of Oklahoma Governor Brad Henry. She was inducted into the Oklahoma Women's Hall of Fame in 2011.

In January 2013, Taylor announced that she would run again for her old job as mayor of Tulsa in the 2013 election. In the mayoral primary election on June 11, 2013, in which the city used a new non-partisan election system for the first time, Taylor finished first with 42.1% of the vote, ahead of Dewey F. Bartlett Jr., who had 34.2%. She and Bartlett met in a runoff election on November 12, 2013, and Bartlett prevailed, receiving about 55% of the vote. Taylor would later return to the mayor's office in 2016 as the chief of economic development for Mayor G. T. Bynum.

Taylor was awarded the "2018 Anna C. Roth Legacy Award from YWCA Tulsa and the inaugural Order of the Owl award from the University of Oklahoma College of Law."

During the 2024 Tulsa mayoral election, she endorsed Monroe Nichols. For her 70th birthday, she helped paint a mural in Tulsa celebrating Route 66.

Taylor came out in support of the Oklahoma Survivors act, writing a Tulsa World opinion that lawmakers should clarify their intent with the law because of Oklahoma judges denying applicants. She said the law risks becoming an "empty promise" after April Rose Wilkens was denied. In another opinion piece, she criticized Governor Kevin Stitt's bulldozing of "homeless encampments" in Tulsa as a "political stunt" and "performance theater"; Taylor called for a "long-term solution to homelessness."

== University of Tulsa deanship ==
On July 1, 2021, Kathy Taylor was appointed interim dean of the Collins College of Business at the University of Tulsa. University president Brad Carson made this position permanent on October 14 of the same year. Taylor served in this role for three years until announcing that she was stepping down in May 2024. During Taylor’s tenure at the helm of the college, three interdisciplinary new centers – the Center for Innovation and Entrepreneurship, Center for Energy Studies, and Center for Real Estate Studies – were created.

== The Lobeck Taylor Family Foundation and other boards ==
Taylor and her husband, Bill Lobeck, founded The Lobeck Taylor Family Foundation in 1997. They founded the organization to promote entrepreneurship in Tulsa and eliminate barriers that stand in the way. Taylor also "served on several corporate boards, including Sonic Corp., Bank of Oklahoma, National Car Rental, and Dollar Car Rental" as well as the "Tulsa Public Facilities Authority; 36°N, a basecamp for entrepreneurs; StitchCrew, a business accelerator...and VEST, a network for expanding the pipeline of women in positions of influence."

== Notes ==
Political offices
Preceded by Russell Perry as Oklahoma Secretary of Economic Development and Special Affairs	Oklahoma Secretary of Commerce and Tourism; 2003–2006	Succeeded by Natalie Shirley
Preceded by Ronald Bussert	Director of the Oklahoma Department of Commerce; 2003–2006	Succeeded by Amy Polonchek
Preceded by Bill LaFortune	Mayor of Tulsa; 2006–2009	Succeeded by Dewey Bartlett
