= Sean Kouplen =

Oklahoma Secretary of Commerce
- In office April 2019 – February 2021
- Governor: Kevin Stitt
- Preceded by: Deby Snodgrass
- Succeeded by: Scott Mueller

Personal details
- Parent: Steve Kouplen (father)

Sean Kouplen is an American businessman who served as the Oklahoma Secretary of Commerce from 2019 to 2021 during the administration of Governor Kevin Stitt.

== Biography ==
Sean Kouplen is the son of Steve Kouplen, a state representative. He grew up on a farm and later served as the CEO of Regent Bank in Tulsa. He was nominated to succeed Deby Snodgrass as the Oklahoma Secretary of Commerce by Governor Kevin Stitt. The senate confirmed his nomination in April 2019. He resigned in February 2021 to return to the private sector. He was succeeded in office by Scott Mueller.
