= Pearson, Oklahoma =

Pearson
- Unincorporated community
- Location within the state of Oklahoma Pearson (the United States)
- Coordinates: 35°04′22″N 96°55′04″W
- Country: United States
- State: Oklahoma
- County: Pottawatomie
- Time zone: UTC-6 (Central (CST))
  - Summer (DST): UTC-5 (CDT)

Pearson is an unincorporated community in Pottawatomie County, Oklahoma, United States. It is located just east of the U.S. Route 177/State Highway 3W - State Highway 59 junction. The locale is old enough to appear on a 1911 Rand McNally map of the county.
