= Michelle Day =

American politician

31st Secretary of State of Oklahoma
- In office February 1, 2013 – March 1, 2013
- Governor: Mary Fallin
- Preceded by: Glenn Coffee
- Succeeded by: Larry Parman

Personal details
- Education: Central State University (BS); University of Oklahoma (JD)

Michelle Day is an American attorney and politician from Oklahoma. Day served as the 31st Oklahoma Secretary of State, having been appointed by Governor Mary Fallin to serve in an interim position following the resignation of Glenn Coffee. Fallin then appointed Larry Parman.

Day earned a degree in accounting from Central State University and a Juris Doctor from the University of Oklahoma. Previously, she had served as deputy state auditor, an assistant district attorney general, general counsel for the Oklahoma Department of Central Services, and assistant chief counsel and associate counsel for the Oklahoma Department of Public Safety. (Note: All of Day's previous positions in the state government have been appointive.)

Day currently works as an attorney in Oklahoma City.

== Note ==
Oklahoma Senate
Preceded by Glenn Coffee	Oklahoma Secretary of State; Under Governor Mary Fallin; February 1, 2013-March 1, 2013	Succeeded by Larry Parman
