= Ripley, Oklahoma =

- Town
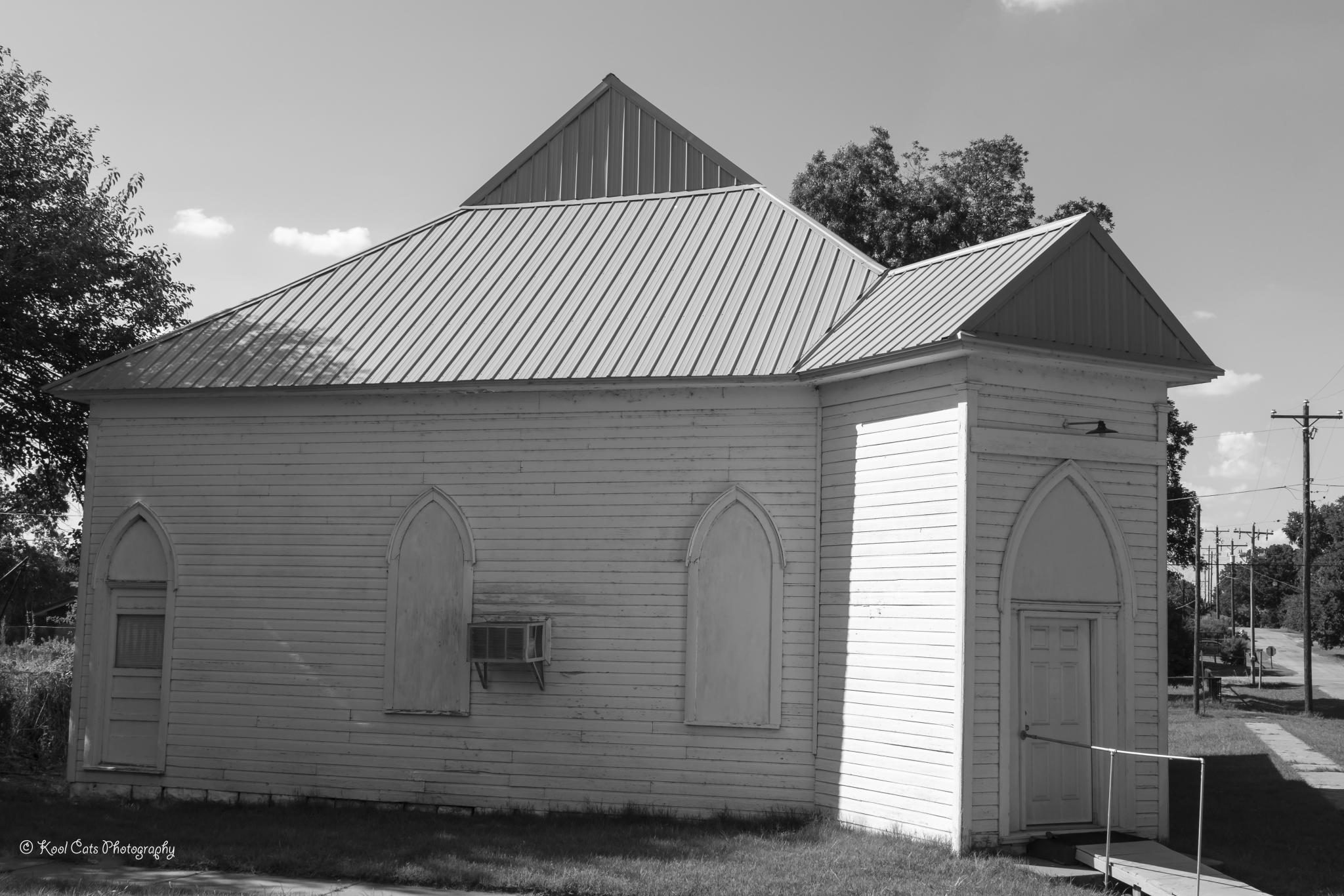
- Old church in Ripley (2013)

- Location within Payne County and Oklahoma
- Coordinates: 36°00′57″N 96°54′14″W
- Country: United States
- State: Oklahoma
- County: Payne

Area
  - Total: 0.47 sq mi (1.23 km^{2})
  - Land: 0.47 sq mi (1.23 km^{2})
  - Water: 0 sq mi (0.00 km^{2})
- Elevation: 856 ft (261 m)

Population (2020)
  - Total: 346
  - Density: 730.4/sq mi (282.01/km^{2})
- Time zone: UTC-6 (Central (CST))
  - Summer (DST): UTC-5 (CDT)
- ZIP code: 74062
- Area codes: 539/918
- FIPS code: 40-63500
- GNIS feature ID: 2412554
- Website: www.townofripleyok.gov

Ripley is a town in southeastern Payne County, Oklahoma, United States. The population was 346 at the 2020 census, a decline of 14.1 percent from the figure of 403 in 2010. The town was named after Edward Ripley, the 14th president of the Atchison, Topeka and Santa Fe Railway.

== History ==
The Atchison, Topeka and Santa Fe Railway (often called simply the Santa Fe) developed Ripley and auctioned the first lots on January 13, 1900. Three months later, the Ripley Times, reported that the community's population had already reached 1,000 persons. (Note: The official U.S. Census for 1900 showed only 474 persons. No explanation for the discrepancy is available. Either the numbers were collected at different times, or the larger number included many people intending to file homestead claims near Ripley.) The first wagon bridge across the Cimarron River was completed July 31, 1900, which was the excuse for a big party that lasted until the wee hours of the next morning.

Agriculture became the main source of income besides the railroad. A large farm named Morehead Plantation hired many African-American laborers to produce cotton. The cotton business declined sharply after World War I, but oil discoveries in the county offset the cotton decline for a while. However, oil markets declined in the late 1920s and the beginning of the Great Depression caused the town economy to decline. Ripley's population declined from a peak of 487 in 1930 to 292 in 1950 and 263 in 1960. The population rebounded to 451 in 1980 and 376 in 1990. It peaked again in 2009 at 510; by 2016, it dropped to 403 people.

== Geography ==
According to the United States Census Bureau, the town has a total area of 0.4 square miles (1.0 km^{2}), all land.

Ripley is on the Cimarron River; it is southeast of Stillwater (8 miles (13 km) east on State Highway 51 and 7 miles (11 km) south on State Highway 108), and west-northwest of Cushing.

== Demographics ==
Historical population
Census	Pop.	Note	%±
1900	474		—
1910	368		−22.4%
1920	406		10.3%
1930	487		20.0%
1940	415		−14.8%
1950	292		−29.6%
1960	263		−9.9%
1970	307		16.7%
1980	451		46.9%
1990	376		−16.6%
2000	444		18.1%
2010	403		−9.2%
2020	346		−14.1%
U.S. Decennial Census

=== 2020 census ===
As of the 2020 census, Ripley had a population of 346. The median age was 37.3 years. 26.6% of residents were under the age of 18 and 17.1% of residents were 65 years of age or older. For every 100 females there were 108.4 males, and for every 100 females age 18 and over there were 106.5 males age 18 and over.

0.0% of residents lived in urban areas, while 100.0% lived in rural areas.

There were 137 households in Ripley, of which 39.4% had children under the age of 18 living in them. Of all households, 48.2% were married-couple households, 24.1% were households with a male householder and no spouse or partner present, and 20.4% were households with a female householder and no spouse or partner present. About 29.9% of all households were made up of individuals and 10.9% had someone living alone who was 65 years of age or older.

There were 162 housing units, of which 15.4% were vacant. The homeowner vacancy rate was 2.0% and the rental vacancy rate was 9.6%.

Racial composition as of the 2020 census
Race	Number	Percent
White	302	87.3%
Black or African American	1	0.3%
American Indian and Alaska Native	9	2.6%
Asian	1	0.3%
Native Hawaiian and Other Pacific Islander	0	0.0%
Some other race	4	1.2%
Two or more races	29	8.4%
Hispanic or Latino (of any race)	23	6.6%

=== 2000 census ===
As of the census of 2000, there were 444 people, 158 households, and 118 families residing in the town. The population density was 1,189.9 inhabitants per square mile (459.4/km^{2}). There were 180 housing units at an average density of 482.4 per square mile (186.3/km^{2}). The racial makeup of the town was 89.64% White, 0.00% African American, 4.95% Native American, 0.00% Asian, 0.00% Pacific Islander, 0.00% from other races, and 5.41% from two or more races. 1.35% of the population were Hispanic or Latino of any race.

There were 158 households, out of which 40.5% had children under the age of 18 living with them, 51.3% were married couples living together, 15.8% had a female householder with no husband present, and 24.7% were non-families. 23.4% of all households were made up of individuals, and 10.8% had someone living alone who was 65 years of age or older. The average household size was 2.81 and the average family size was 3.21.

In the town, the population was spread out, with 32.9% under the age of 18, 9.5% from 18 to 24, 26.1% from 25 to 44, 19.6% from 45 to 64, and 11.9% who were 65 years of age or older. The median age was 32 years. For every 100 females, there were 88.1 males. For every 100 females age 18 and over, there were 86.3 males.

The median income for a household in the town was $24,643, and the median income for a family was $36,250. Males had a median income of $26,500 versus $15,250 for females. The per capita income for the town was $10,030. 18.9% of the population and 18.0% of families were below the poverty line. 19.7% of those under the age of 18 and 9.1% of those 65 and older were living below the poverty line.

== Notable people ==
- William A. Berry (1915–2004). Born in Ripley. Justice of the Oklahoma Supreme Court.
- Billy McGinty (1871–1961) Member of the Roosevelt Rough Riders Association. McGinty's Cowboy Band
- Casey Sadler (1990-) MLB pitcher for the Seattle Mariners

== Landmarks ==
- Allen Williamson Bridge - Memorial bridge near Ripley, named after the Oklahoma Representative Allen Williamson.
- The Hopkins Sandstone House and Farmstead is listed on the National Register of Historic Places listings in Payne County, Oklahoma.
