= 2006 Tulsa mayoral election =

- April 4, 2006
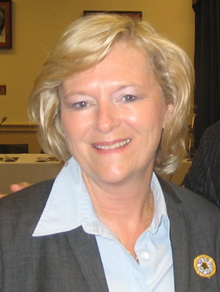

Nominee	Kathy Taylor	Bill LaFortune
Party	Democratic	Republican
Popular vote	39,453	36,016
Percentage	51.01%	46.56%
Mayor before election
Bill LaFortune
Republican
Elected Mayor
Kathy Taylor
Democratic

The 2006 Tulsa mayoral election was held on April 4, 2006, to elect the mayor of Tulsa, Oklahoma. Partisan primary elections were held on March 7, 2006.

Incumbent Republican Bill LaFortune ran for re-election. He was defeated in the general election by Democratic nominee Kathy Taylor, who became the second female mayor of Tulsa after Susan Savage.

== Republican primary ==
=== Candidates ===
- Brigitte Harper
- Bill LaFortune, incumbent mayor
- Christopher Medlock
- Randi Miller, Tulsa County commissioner

=== Endorsements ===
Randi Miller
- Richard Roberts, president of Oral Roberts University

=== Results ===
Republican primary
Party	Candidate	Votes	%
Republican	Bill LaFortune (incumbent)	13,894	42.69
Republican	Christopher Medlock	11,105	34.12
Republican	Randi Miller	7,038	21.62
Republican	Brigitte Harper	513	1.58
Total votes		32,550	100.00

== Democratic primary ==
=== Candidates ===
- James Alexander Jr.
- Accountability Burns
- Prophet-Kelly Clark
- James Desmond, candidate for mayor in 1988
- Don McCorkell, former state representative
- Kathy Taylor, Oklahoma Secretary of Commerce, Tourism, and Workforce Development

=== Results ===
Democratic primary
Party	Candidate	Votes	%
Democratic	Kathy Taylor	16,852	79.76
Democratic	Don McCorkell	2,952	13.97
Democratic	James Alexander, Jr.	431	2.04
Democratic	James Desmond	303	1.43
Democratic	Prophet-Kelly Clark	298	1.41
Democratic	Accountability Burns	292	1.38
Total votes		21,128	100.00

== Independents ==
=== Candidates ===
- Benford L. Faulk
- Paul C. Tay, candidate for mayor in 2002

== General election ==
=== Results ===
2006 Tulsa mayoral election
Party	Candidate	Votes	%
Democratic	Kathy Taylor	39,453	51.01
Republican	Bill LaFortune (incumbent)	36,016	46.56
Independent	Benford L. Faulk	1,484	1.92
Independent	Paul C. Tay	398	0.52
Total votes		77,351	100.00
Democratic gain from Republican			
