= Glenn Coffee =

American lawyer and politician

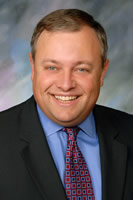

30th Secretary of State of Oklahoma
- In office January 11, 2011 – February 1, 2013
- Governor: Mary Fallin
- Preceded by: M. Susan Savage
- Succeeded by: Michelle Day

President pro tempore of the Oklahoma Senate
- In office 2009–2011
- Preceded by: Mike Morgan
- Succeeded by: Brian Bingman

Minority Leader of the Oklahoma Senate
- In office 2005–2007
- Preceded by: James Allen Williamson
- Succeeded by: Charlie Laster

Member of the Oklahoma Senate from the 30th district
- In office 1999–2011
- Preceded by: Howard Hendrick
- Succeeded by: David Holt

Personal details
- Born: January 20, 1967 (age 59) Lubbock, Texas, U.S.
- Party: Republican
- Spouse: Lisa
- Children: 4
- Education: Northeastern State University (BA); University of Oklahoma (JD)

Virgil Glenn Coffee (born January 20, 1967) is an American lawyer and Republican politician from the U.S. state of Oklahoma. Coffee was the 30th Oklahoma Secretary of State, having been appointed by Governor Mary Fallin. He served from January 10, 2011, until he resigned effective February 1, 2013. He was the first Republican President Pro Tempore, having previously served as a Co-President Pro Tempore during the previous legislature.

One of Coffee's most notable achievements was the passage of a comprehensive lawsuit reform measure in Oklahoma, signed into law in May 2009.

== Early life and career ==
Coffee was born in Lubbock, Texas on January 20, 1967, and moved to Oklahoma City. He graduated from Northeastern State University in Tahlequah, Oklahoma in 1988 with a bachelor's degree in political science before attending the University of Oklahoma College of Law, where he earned a Juris Doctor.

Coffee joined the Oklahoma law firm Phillips Murrah, P.C., and continued his private practice during his time at the Oklahoma Legislature.

== Political career ==
=== Oklahoma Senate ===
First elected to the Oklahoma Senate in 1998, Coffee was re-elected to without opposition in 2006. Coffee served as one of two Co-President Pro Tempores of the Oklahoma Senate during the 2007 and 2008 legislative sessions and 41st President Pro Tempore for a one-month term because of a tied Senate membership.

After the 2008 elections gave the Republican caucus of the Oklahoma Senate outright control of the chamber on November 4, 2008, the caucus elected Coffee as the President Pro Tempore on November 6, 2008. He was the first Republican in state history to serve in the position. One of his most notable achievements as President Pro Tempore was the passage of a comprehensive lawsuit reform measure in Oklahoma, signed into law in May 2009.

=== Fallin Administration ===
Due to term limits placed on him by the Oklahoma Constitution, Coffee was unable to seek re-election in 2010. However, following the election of Mary Fallin as Governor of Oklahoma in November 2010, Coffee was named as the Co-Chairman of her Transition Committee. On January 4, 2011, Fallin named Coffee as her Secretary of State. As Secretary of State, Coffee represented the governor in budgetary and legislative discussions between the executive branch and the Oklahoma Legislature. Coffee resigned in December, 2012 with an effective date of February 1, 2013, to return to private law practice.

== See also ==
- 51st Oklahoma Legislature
- 52nd Oklahoma Legislature
- Oklahoma Republican Party

Oklahoma Senate
Preceded by Howard Hendrick	Member of the Oklahoma Senate from the 30th district 1999–2011	Succeeded by David Holt
Political offices
Preceded by Mike Morgan	President pro tempore of the Oklahoma Senate; 2009–2011	Succeeded by Brian Bingman
Preceded by M. Susan Savage	Secretary of State of Oklahoma; 2011–2013	Succeeded by Michelle Day
