= Oklahoma State Highway 18 =

State highway in Oklahoma, United States

State Highway 18

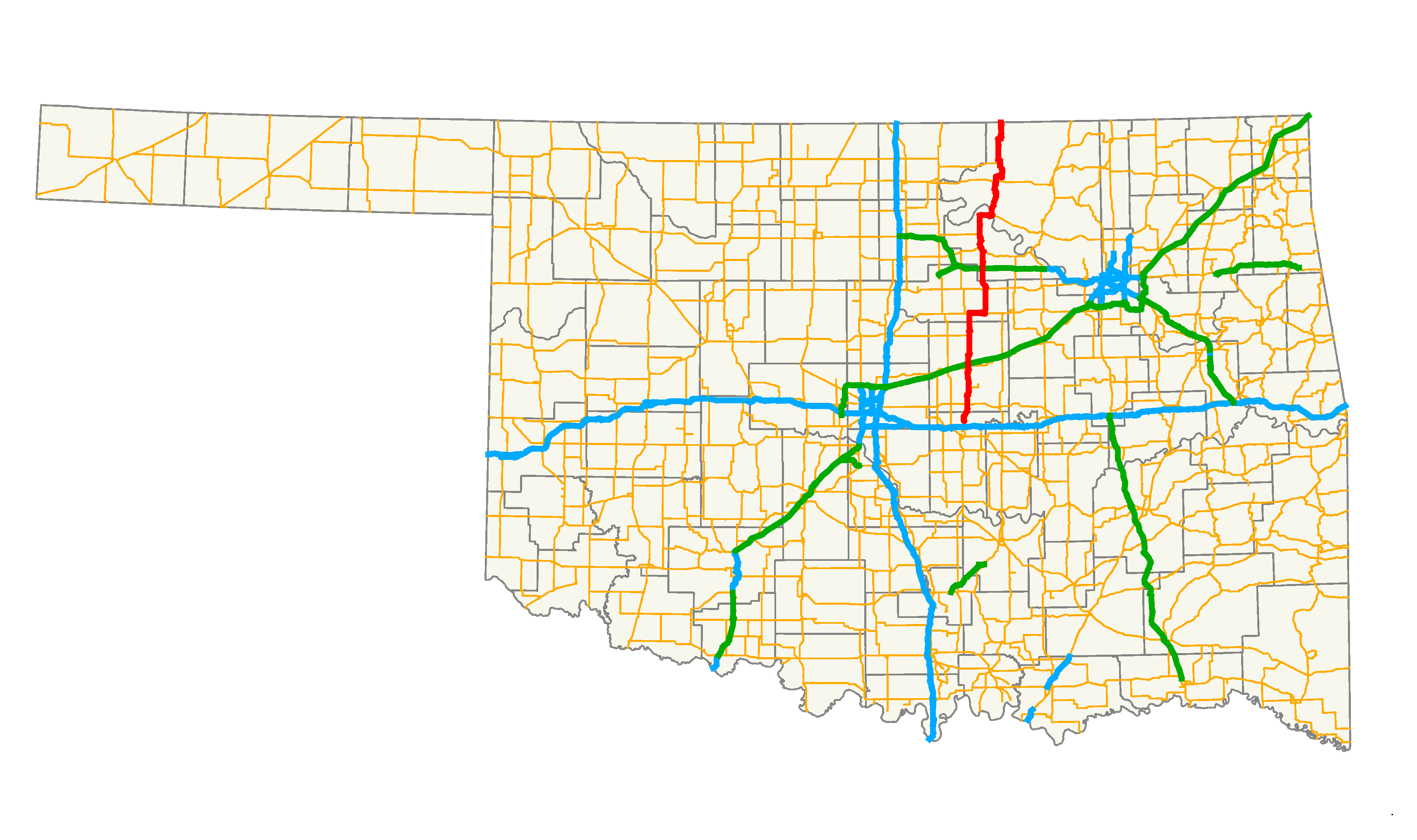

Route information
- Maintained by ODOT
- Length: 134.4 mi (216.3 km)
- Existed: 1924–present

Major junctions
- South end: US 177 / US 270 / US 270 Bus. / SH-3W in Shawnee
- I-40 in Shawnee; US 62 in Meeker; I-44 / Turner Turnpike in Chandler; Future I-42 / US 412 / Cimarron Turnpike near Maramec US 64 in Pawnee
- North end: K-15 at the Kansas state line near Grainola

Location
- Country: United States
- State: Oklahoma

Highway system
- Oklahoma State Highway System; Interstate; US; State; Turnpikes
← SH-17A	→ SH-19

State Highway 18, abbreviated as SH-18 or OK-18, is a highway maintained by the U.S. state of Oklahoma. It was once one of the longest state highways in the Oklahoma road system, but now has a total length of 134.4 mi (216.3 km).

== Route description ==
State Highway 18 was commissioned in August 1924 and, at one time, traveled from Dickson, Oklahoma to Shidler, Oklahoma at the Kansas border. Much of SH-18 has been replaced by US-177. The current Highway 18 begins in Shawnee, Oklahoma at an interchange with US-177/270 and SH-3W. The highway is known as Harrison Street through Shawnee. After Shawnee, SH-18 intersects with US-62 in Meeker, Oklahoma and then into Chandler, Oklahoma concurrent with SH-66. The highways split after leaving Chandler's business district. SH-18 intersects with I-44 and then travels on to Agra, Oklahoma. After Agra, SH-18 joins with SH-33 heading into Cushing, Oklahoma where SH-18 separates and heads to Pawnee, Oklahoma. South of there, the highway overlaps US-64 for two miles (3 km). SH-18 crosses the Arkansas River in Ralston, Oklahoma and intersects with SH-20. Near the Osage Indian Reservation, SH-18 joins with SH-11 at US-60 and remains joined until Shidler, where SH-11 separates. 16 miles (26 km) later SH-18 becomes K-15 as it crosses the state line into Kansas.

== Old 18 ==
US-177 replaced SH-18 between Dickson and Shawnee in 1967.

=== Dickson to Asher ===
US-177 runs roughly on top of the previous SH-18 between Dickson and Asher, Oklahoma, therefore only a few small segments of the original highway remain through that stretch.

=== Asher to Shawnee ===
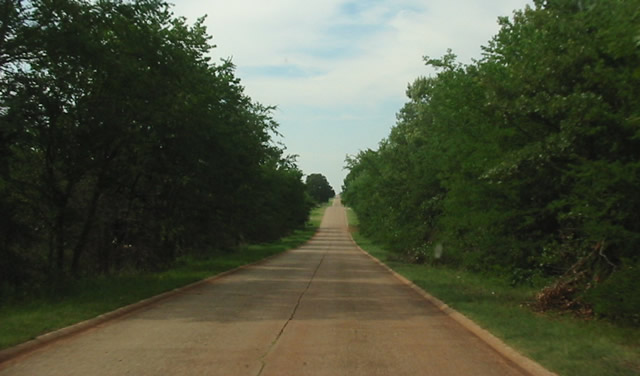
Old SH-18 north of Asher

Much of the old highway from south of Asher to Tecumseh, Oklahoma still remains. Remnants of the old highway begin north of the curve just before US-177 junctions with SH-3W, south of the Canadian River. SH 18 (now US-177) originally continued straight ahead and then turned slightly ahead of where US-177 does now. The existing old highway runs parallel west of US-177 for about a mile, before terminating short of the Canadian River. Originally, the highway continued straight for about another 0.5 miles (0.80 km) (taking it over the river) before veering east and then back north. The cement supports of the old bridge can still be seen if you look westward at the north and south banks, while crossing the Canadian River bridge (coincidentally, the bridge may return to that location if reports of replacing the Canadian River Bridge are true). Much of the section after the river and before the highway intersects with SH-39 has been lost due to another bridge being removed.

The existing highway picks up again after a second removed bridge and 0.7 miles (1.1 km) before intersecting with SH-39 south of Asher. The highway continues north through Asher (here named Division Street) for 1.5 miles (2.4 km) before again veering east and then once more travels roughly north. The road is mostly intact except for a small area near Pearson, Oklahoma where it is rerouted to cross SH-59. North of Pearson is the Salt Creek Bridge, a 120' long OSHC standard design, built in 1930.

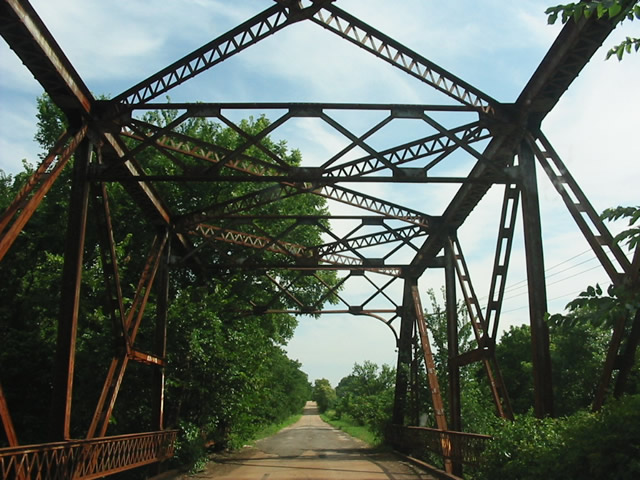
Salt Creek Bridge

Near Macomb, Oklahoma the old highway again travels parallel and very near to US-177. The highway is interrupted once because of the removed Little River Bridge before reaching the Brooksville, Oklahoma area. Here, the highway is slightly rerouted to cross US-177 (veering west) and then heads north toward Tecumseh. The designation "Old 18" ends here as the highway has been absorbed into city streets, although it appears the highway traveled east down what is now Highland, then north on Broadway and continued to Shawnee on what is now Gordon Cooper Drive/Beard Street. Beard Street intersects with Farrall Street in Shawnee, which is the current SH-18. East of this intersection, SH-18 ends and loops into US-177. West of the intersection, Farrall veers north and merges into Harrison Avenue. At this point, 18 continues as a current state highway.

=== Notes ===
- There is roughly 20 miles (32 km) of drivable road designated "Old 18" between US-177 / SH-3W Junction south of Asher and Tecumseh, although it can not be driven continuously.
- The longest uninterrupted stretch of Old 18 is about 14.5 miles (23.3 km), between Asher and the Little River near Brooksville.
- Except for a 1½ mile repaved stretch through Asher, Old 18 shows its original concrete construction (although heavily patched with pavement).
- At its furthest, Old 18 rests 1½ miles east of its replacement, US-177.
- The curved edges and poor drainage of the highway can make it dangerous during heavy rain as it greatly retains water.
- The original Canadian River Bridge south of Asher was in use from 1921 to 1967. It has since been removed.

== Spurs ==
SH-18 has two lettered spurs.

- SH-18A no longer connects to current SH-18. It serves the Chickasaw National Recreation Area.
- SH-18B serves the town of Sparks, Oklahoma.

== Junction list ==
County	Location	mi	km	Destinations	Notes
Pottawatomie	Shawnee	0.0	0.0	US 177 / US 270 / US 270 Bus. / SH-3W	Southern terminus; southern terminus of US-270 BUS
Pottawatomie	Shawnee	1.8	2.9	US 270 Bus.	
Pottawatomie	Shawnee	2.5	4.0	SH-3E	
Pottawatomie	Shawnee	4.6	7.4	SH-3E	
Pottawatomie	Shawnee	6.0	9.7	I-40	I-40 exit 186.
Lincoln	Meeker	14.6	23.5	US 62	
Lincoln		14.6	23.5	SH-18B	Western terminus of SH-18B
Lincoln	Chandler	28.1	45.2	SH-66	
Lincoln	Chandler	29.0	46.7	SH-66	
Lincoln	Chandler	29.9	48.1	I-44 Toll / Turner Turnpike	I-44 exit 166.
Lincoln		40.6	65.3	SH-105	Eastern terminus of SH-105
Payne		48.8	78.5	SH-33	
Payne	Cushing	55.0	88.5	SH-33	
Payne		63.6	102.4	SH-51	
Pawnee		71.8	115.6	US 412 / Cimarron Turnpike	US 412 exit 37.
Pawnee		78.1	125.7	US 64	
Pawnee	Pawnee	80.2	129.1	US 64	
Pawnee		85.1	137.0	SH-15	Eastern terminus of SH-15
Osage		96.6	155.5	SH-20	Western terminus of SH-20
Osage		109.7	176.5	US 60 / SH-11	US-60 does not concur
Osage	Shidler	118.4	190.5	SH-11	
Osage		134.4	216.3	K-15	Northern terminus, Kansas state line
1.000 mi = 1.609 km; 1.000 km = 0.621 mi: Concurrency terminus
