= Larry Parman =

American politician

Larry V. Parman

32nd Secretary of State of Oklahoma
- In office March 1, 2013 – November 1, 2013
- Governor: Mary Fallin
- Preceded by: Michelle Day
- Succeeded by: Chris Benge

Oklahoma Secretary of Commerce
- In office November 1, 2013 – December 31, 2014
- Governor: Mary Fallin
- Preceded by: Dave Lopez
- Succeeded by: Deby Snodgrass

Director of the Oklahoma Department of Commerce
- In office November 1, 2013 – December 31, 2014
- Governor: Mary Fallin
- Preceded by: Jonna Kirschner
- Succeeded by: Deby Snodgrass

Personal details
- Profession: Attorney

Larry V. Parman is an American attorney whose practice centers on estate planning and helping business owners grow and transition their business to family members, insiders, or third-parties.

Parman is the author of The Straight Shooter's Guide to Estate Planning and Guiding Those Left Behind - Settling the Affairs of Your Loved One. He is also the author of Above the Fray - Leading Yourself, Your Business, and Others During Turbulent Times and Economic Dominos - Predictable Events of the Economic Cycle. He was the co-author of Estate Planning Basics - Protecting Your Estate and Legacy and a contribuing author of Stop and Think - Important Financial Advice for You and Your Family.

Parman served as the Oklahoma Secretary of Commerce and Executive Director of the Oklahoma Department of Commerce, having been appointed by Governor Mary Fallin in October, 2013 to commence on November 1, 2013. Prior to being named Secretary of Commerce, Parman was the 32nd Oklahoma Secretary of State, also having been appointed by Governor Mary Fallin. He served from March 1, 2011 until he resigned effective November 1, 2013 to assume his duties at Commerce.

Since 2016, Parman has served as the Chairman of the Board of Trustees of the Oklahoma Council of Public Affairs (OCPA). He was twice elected chairman of the Oklahoma City chapter of Junior Achievement. He is a past member of the board of the Oklahoma State Chamber of Commerce, the Committee of 100 in Oklahoma City, and the and the Research Institute for Economic Development ("RIED"). He is a member of the Oklahoma City Rotary Club 29.

Parman received his undergraduate degree from the University of Missouri, where he was President of his fraternity, a member of the Student Activities Board, and was selected to be a member of Mystical Seven, a secret honor society at the University of Missouri that chooses seven outstanding seniors each year in recognition of their leadership and service to the University. He earned his Juris Doctor from the University of Missouri-Kansas City and is a member of the Missouri and Oklahoma Bar Associations. Larry and his wife Darlene are proud parents of Aly Pitts of Portland, OR and Scott Parman of Oklahoma City, OK and doting grandparents of Desmond and Sage Pitts.

Political offices
| Preceded by Dave Lopez | Oklahoma Secretary of Commerce; Under Governor Mary Fallin; November 1, 2013 - | Succeeded by Deby Snodgrass |
| Preceded by Jonna Kirschner | Director of the Oklahoma Department of Commerce; Under Governor Mary Fallin; November 1, 2013 - | Succeeded by Deby Snodgrass |
| Preceded by Michelle Day | Oklahoma Secretary of State; Under Governor Mary Fallin; March 1, 2013–November 1, 2013 | Succeeded by Chris Benge |
