= Steve Kouplen =

American politician

Minority Leader of the Oklahoma House of Representatives
- In office October 25, 2017 – November 15, 2018
- Preceded by: Scott Inman
- Succeeded by: Emily Virgin

Member of the Oklahoma House of Representatives from the 24th district
- In office November 18, 2008 – November 15, 2018
- Preceded by: Dale Turner
- Succeeded by: Logan Phillips

Personal details
- Born: February 5, 1951 (age 75) Beggs, Oklahoma, U.S.
- Party: Democratic
- Children: Sean Kouplen
- Education: Oklahoma State University, Stillwater (BS, MS)

Steve Kouplen (born February 5, 1951) is an American politician who served in the Oklahoma House of Representatives from the 24th district from 2008 to 2018.

== Oklahoma House of Representatives ==
On November 6, 2018, he was defeated by Republican Logan Phillips.

== USDA's Farm Service Agency ==
On January 20, 2022, Kouplen was appointed the executive director of the USDA's Farm Service Agency in Oklahoma.

Oklahoma House of Representatives
Preceded by Scott Inman	Minority Leader of the Oklahoma House of Representatives; 2017–2018	Succeeded by Emily Virgin
