= Logan Phillips =

American politician (born 1982)

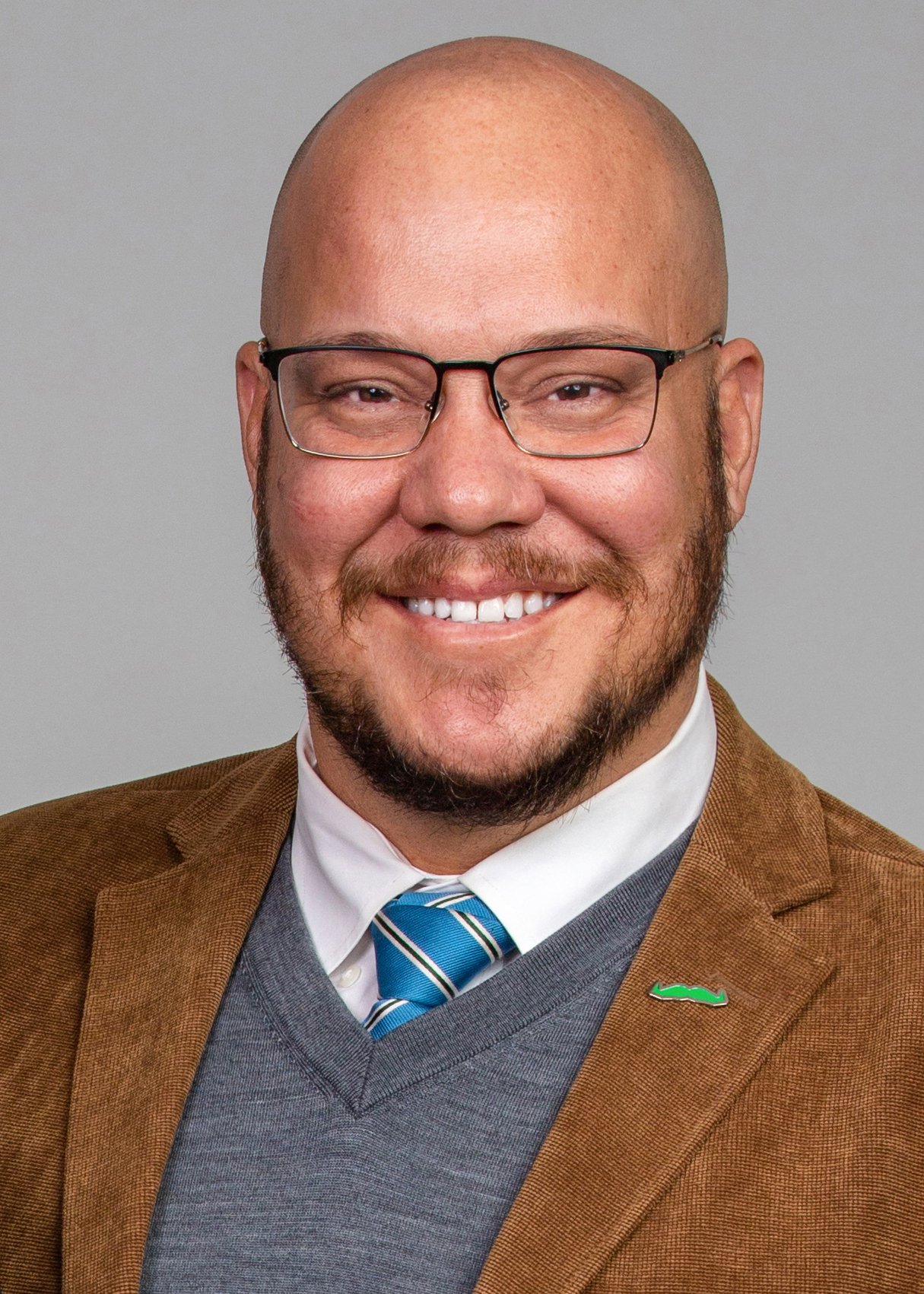

Member of the Oklahoma House of Representatives from the 24th district
- In office November 15, 2018 – November 16, 2022
- Preceded by: Steve Kouplen
- Succeeded by: Chris Banning

Personal details
- Born: Logan J. Phillips; December 15, 1982 (age 43) Tulsa, Oklahoma, U.S.
- Party: Republican
- Education: Tulsa Community College (A.S.); Oklahoma State University–Tulsa (M.E.)

Logan J. Phillips (born December 15, 1982) is an American politician and teacher who served in the Oklahoma House of Representatives from the 24th district from 2018 to 2022.

== Early life and education ==
Logan Phillips was born on December 15, 1982, in Tulsa, Oklahoma. He attended Tulsa Community College where he earned an associate degree in business administration followed by a B.S. in Business and information technology from Oklahoma State, and a master's degree in teaching, learning and leadership from Oklahoma State University.

== Career ==
From 2000 to 2006 Phillips served in the United States Army. Prior to running for office, Phillips worked as an Assistant Professor of Business and Information Technology at Tulsa Community College.

=== Oklahoma House of Representatives ===
During his time in the Oklahoma house of representatives Logan Phillips has served as the Chairman of the House Technology Committee and co-Chairman of the Rural Broadband Expansion Council, and chairman of Technology and Chairman of ARPA working group on Infrastructure and Broadband.

==== Campaigns ====
Phillips filed to run for office in Oklahoma's 24th house district after participating in the 2018 Oklahoma teacher protests. He spent no money on his first run for office and unseated the Democratic House Minority leader Steve Kouplen in the November 2018 general election. Political analysts attributed the win to the nationalization of local politics and the prevalence of straight-ticket voting in the district, where 48% of Phillips's voters had marked "Republican" on the straight-party voting option. The race was considered part of a trend of eastern Oklahoma voters shifting more Republican.

In 2020, Phillips again faced Steve Kouplen in the general election, along with new opponents Sam Stamper, John Baca, and Elijah Harelson in the Republican primary.

Phillips's house district was drastically redrawn in 2022 and he faced two primary challengers from Bixby, Chris Banning and Bobby Schultz. During the primary the political action committee School Freedom Fund Oklahoma spent over $90,000 in a campaign against Phillips. He lost his reelection campaign in the June primary to Chris Banning.
