= Scott Inman =

American politician (born 1978)

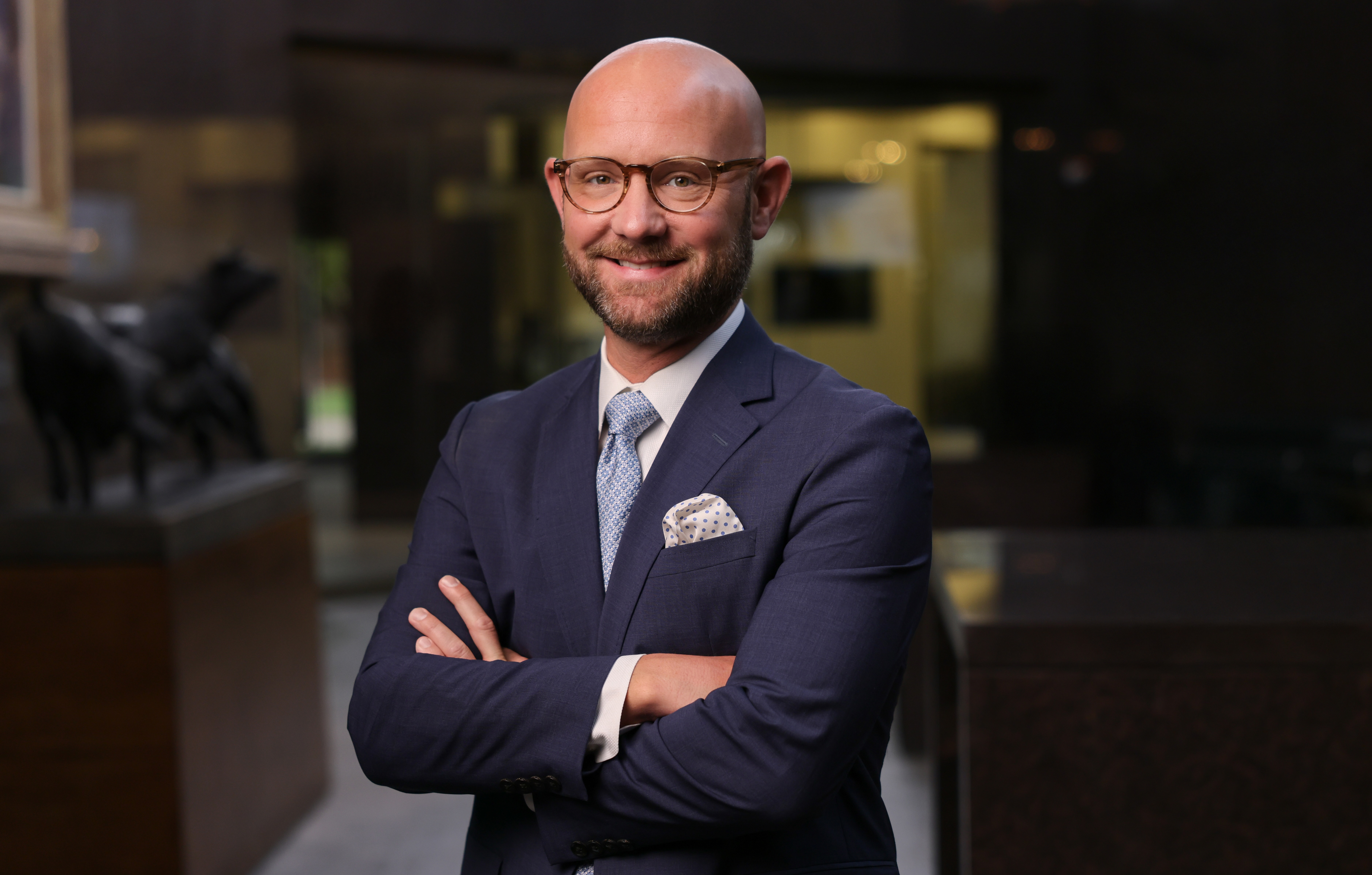

Minority Leader of the Oklahoma House of Representatives
- In office January 5, 2010 – October 25, 2017
- Preceded by: Danny Morgan
- Succeeded by: Steve Kouplen

Member of the Oklahoma House of Representatives from the 94th district
- In office November 2006 – November 15, 2018
- Preceded by: Kevin Calvey
- Succeeded by: Andy Fugate

Personal details
- Born: October 2, 1978 (age 47) Midwest City, Oklahoma, U.S.
- Party: Democratic
- Education: University of Oklahoma (BA, JD)

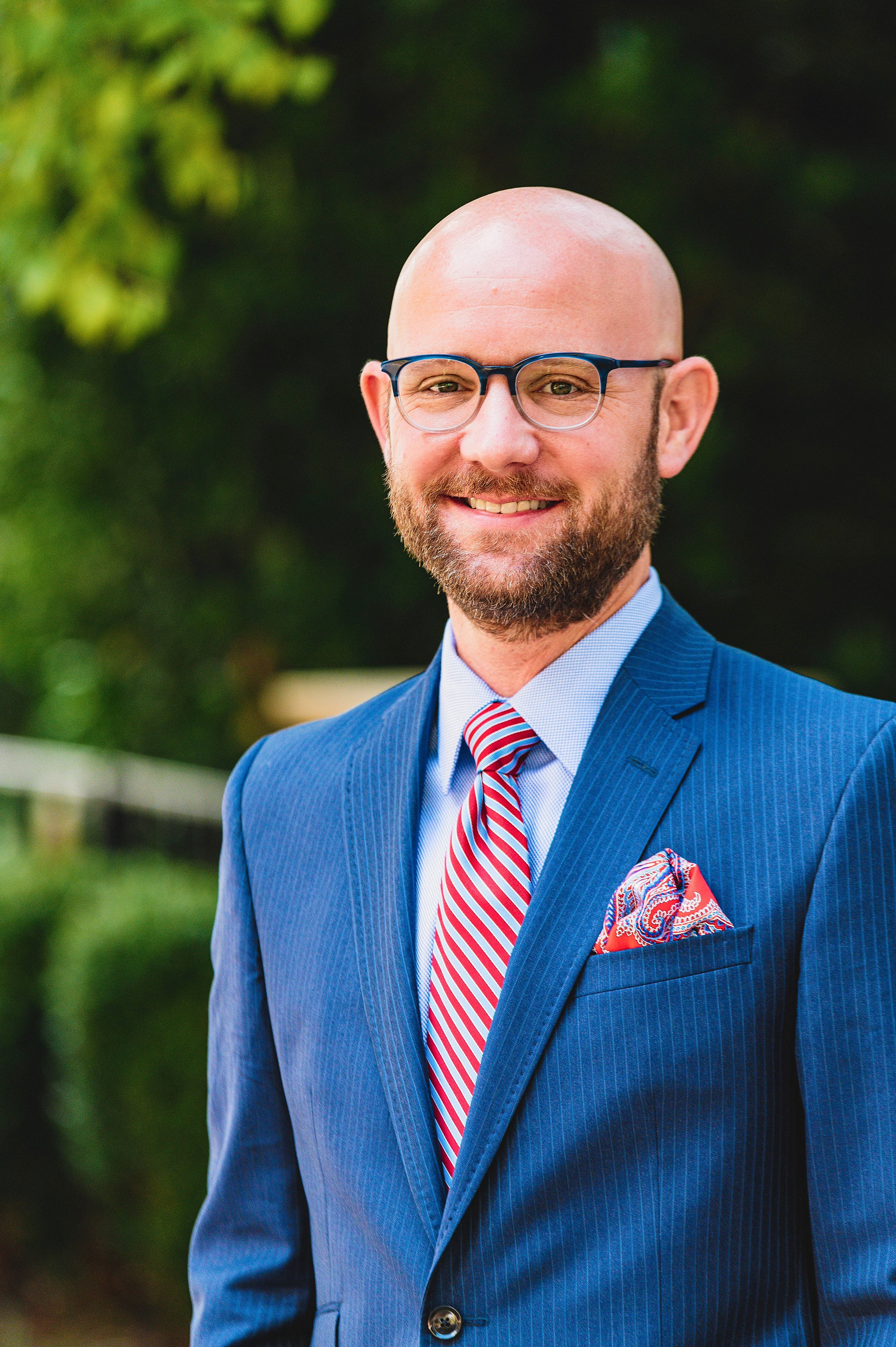

Scott Inman (born October 2, 1978) is an American attorney, banker, and former Democratic politician from the U.S. state of Oklahoma. He served in the Oklahoma House of Representatives as the Minority Leader and Representative of State House District 94 from 2006 to 2018.

== Early life and education ==
Inman was born and raised in Del City, Oklahoma. He graduated at the top of his class from Del City High School in 1997. He then attended the University of Oklahoma, where he graduated in 2001 summa cum laude with a degree in political science and a Spanish minor. Inman also attended the University of Oklahoma College of Law where he received his J.D. in 2004. Upon graduating from law school, he practiced law with a firm in downtown Oklahoma City specializing in insurance defense.

== Political career ==
When state House District 94 became vacant in the spring of 2006, Inman put his law practice on hold and ran for office. Upon his election in the fall of 2006, Inman became the first graduate of Del City High School to represent the city of Del City, Oklahoma at the Oklahoma Legislature. In May 2009, Inman was elected to serve as Leader of the House Democratic Caucus, and re-elected by his colleagues to another two years in May 2011. Inman became the youngest person to lead a caucus in the Oklahoma House or Senate, and the first state representative from Oklahoma County to lead the traditionally rural Democratic caucus in more than 40 years. Inman was subsequently re-elected as House Minority Leader in April 2013 and April 2015. When Inman completed his tenure as leader of the House Democrats, he did so as the longest serving leader of that caucus in state history.

At the start of the 2012 legislative session, Inman announced the legislative agenda of the House Democratic caucus, prioritizing the areas of job creation, public education, transportation and natural resource policies.

In 2012, Inman and House Speaker Kris Steele introduced a proposal to reject a pay raise for statewide officials and judges.

In 2017, Inman campaigned for Governor of Oklahoma in the 2018 election. In October 2017 he dropped his bid for governor.

In 2018, Inman played a key role in the Oklahoma Teacher Walk-Out as part of the negotiations to increase state funding for public education. With his caucus, the legislature reached a compromise that resulted in the largest revenue raising measure in state history and the largest teacher pay raise in Oklahoma history.

Inman completed 12 years in the Oklahoma House of Representatives and was ineligible to run for re-election due to term limits in 2018.

== Business career ==
In January 2018, Inman began work as a Vice President of First Oklahoma Bank located in Jenks, OK. Inman served in that capacity until July 2020 when he began work with Simmons Bank in Oklahoma City as the bank's Business Development Officer for its Oklahoma market.

In early 2021, Inman accepted the role of Vice President of Commercial Lending with Simmons Bank.

In June of 2023, Inman accepted the role as Oklahoma City President of Valliance Bank.

== Personal life ==
Inman married his high school sweetheart, Dessa, in 2006. Together they have two daughters. The couple was married for 12 years and eventually divorced in the spring of 2018.

== Community Involvement ==
- Allied Arts of Oklahoma City - Board Member
- ReMerge of Oklahoma City - Board Member
- YWCA Oklahoma City - Ex-Officio Board Member
- Downtown OKC Rotary Club - Past member
- Del City Rotary, Past President
- Del City Chamber of Commerce - Past Member
- DelQuest Future Leaders of America Program - Past Board Member
- Mid-Del Tinker 100 Club - Past Board Member
- National Parkinson Foundation, Oklahoma Chapter - Past Board Member
- Oklahoma High School Mock Trial Program - Past Board Member
- George Nigh Leadership & Public Service Scholar

Oklahoma House of Representatives
Preceded by Danny Morgan	Minority Leader of the Oklahoma House of Representatives; 2010–2017	Succeeded by Steve Kouplen
