= Allen Williamson =

American politician

Allen Williamson (fl. c. 1970) is a former Oklahoma politician who served in the Oklahoma House of Representatives from 1966 to 1974. He is related to James Allen Williamson, an Oklahoma State Senator elected in 1996.

A bridge near the town of Ripley in Payne County, Oklahoma was named in recognition of his service. Dedicated on December 31, 1974, this bridge across the Cimarron River includes a monument and memorial plaque provided by the Cimarron Valley Historical Society.
