= Oklahoma State Highway 108 =

Highway in Oklahoma, US

State Highway 108

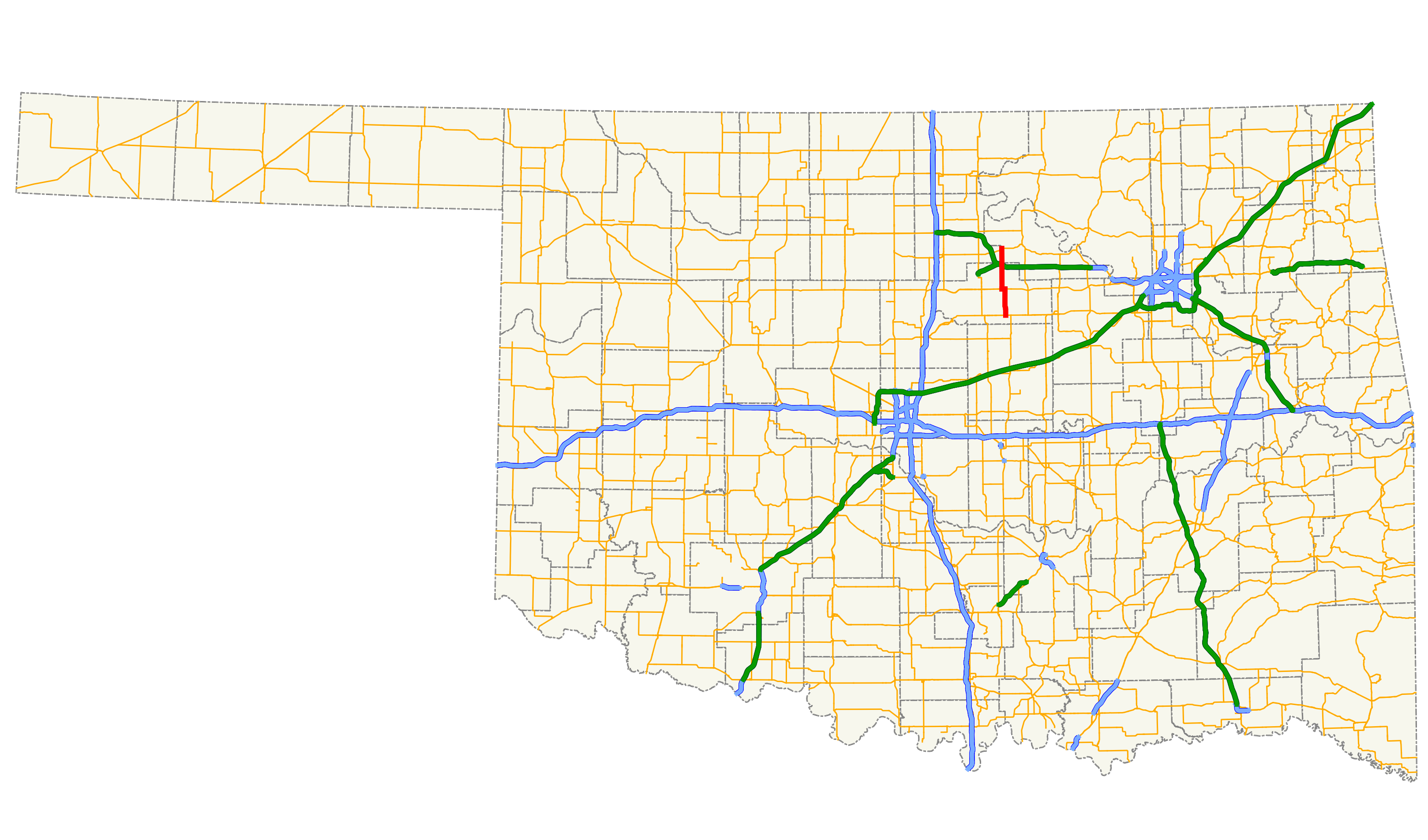

Route information
- Maintained by ODOT
- Length: 24.0 mi (38.6 km)
- Existed: July 11, 1955–present

Major junctions
- South end: SH-33 south of Ripley
- North end: US 64 in Lela

Location
- Country: United States
- State: Oklahoma

Highway system
- Oklahoma State Highway System; Interstate; US; State; Turnpikes
← SH-105	→ SH-109

State Highway 108 (abbreviated SH-108) is a minor state highway in Payne, Noble, and Pawnee counties in north-central Oklahoma. It runs for 24.1 miles (38.8 km), from SH-33 south of Ripley to U.S. Route 64 (US-64) in Lela. It has no lettered spurs.

SH-108 was added to the state highway system on July 11, 1955. It had the same extent it does today; only slight modifications have been made to its alignment due to the straightening of connecting highways.

== Route description ==
SH-108 begins in Payne County approximately halfway between Perkins and Cushing at SH-33. From here, the highway runs north on Ripley Road. About two miles (3.2 km) into its journey, the road passes through the town of Ripley (pop. 444). North of Ripley, it crosses the Cimarron River. Seven miles (11 km) later, the highway intersects SH-51, and SH-108 turns west along it, forming a one-mile (1.6 km) concurrency. SH-108 then continues north on Rose Road.

Approximately eight miles (13 km) north of SH-51, SH-108 enters Glencoe (pop. 583). The highway then crosses the Cimarron Turnpike on a grade separation with no interchange. The highway shifts to the east about one mile (1.6 km) north of Glencoe. Upon exiting Payne County, the highway straddles the Noble–Pawnee County line all the way to its terminus at US-64 in the unincorporated settlement of Lela.

As of 2012, the highest average annual daily traffic (AADT) count along SH-108 was 5,900, measured along the concurrency with SH-51. The highest traffic volume on SH-108 alone was an AADT of 1,900, measured north of SH-51. The lowest AADT measured was 1,500, which occurred both in Glencoe and south of Ripley. No part of SH-108 has been designated as part of the National Highway System.

== History ==
SH-108 was first designated on July 11, 1955. The highway was mostly gravel at that time; only the portions from the southern terminus to Ripley and the concurrency with SH-51 were paved. In 1960, the section of SH-108 between SH-51 and Glencoe was paved. In 1963, the paved segment extended north of Glencoe, to the highway's northern terminus.

The first change to the highway's alignment occurred on November 1, 1966, when SH-51 was straightened between Stillwater and Yale; SH-108 was realigned to continue to concur with SH-51. Around the same time, the remainder of SH-108 was paved. (Note: The 1968 official state map is the first to show the SH-51 realignment, and also shows the connecting segment of SH-108 as paved for the first time.) The final change to SH-108 was made on June 4, 1974, when a straightening of SH-33 resulted in a slight extension of SH-108 to continue to meet the new highway. No changes have been made since.

== Junction list ==
County	Location	mi	km	Destinations	Notes
Payne		0.0	0.0	SH-33	Southern terminus
Payne		9.1	14.6	SH-51	Eastern end of SH-51 concurrency
Payne		10.1	16.3	SH-51	Western end of SH-51 concurrency
Noble–Pawnee county line	Lela	24.1	38.8	US 64	Northern terminus
1.000 mi = 1.609 km; 1.000 km = 0.621 mi: Concurrency terminus
