= Carney, Oklahoma =

- Town
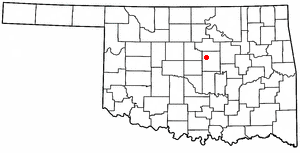
- Location within Oklahoma
- Coordinates: 35°48′22″N 97°00′56″W
- Country: United States
- State: Oklahoma
- County: Lincoln

Area
  - Total: 1.73 sq mi (4.47 km^{2})
  - Land: 1.71 sq mi (4.42 km^{2})
  - Water: 0.019 sq mi (0.05 km^{2})
- Elevation: 1,050 ft (320 m)

Population (2020)
  - Total: 545
  - Density: 319/sq mi (123/km^{2})
- Time zone: UTC−6 (CST)
  - Summer (DST): UTC−5 (CDT)
- ZIP Code: 74832
- Area code: 405/572
- FIPS code: 40-12100
- GNIS ID: 2413172
- Website: townofcarneyok.com

Carney is a town in Lincoln County, Oklahoma, United States. As of the 2020 census, the population of the town was 545.

== History ==
On May 19, 2013, an EF3 tornado struck the southeastern part of town and nearby rural areas.

== Geography ==
According to the United States Census Bureau, the town has a total area of 1.8 square miles (4.7 km^{2}).

== Demographics ==
Historical population
Census	Pop.	Note	%±
1910	260		—
1920	367		41.2%
1930	328		−10.6%
1940	283		−13.7%
1950	277		−2.1%
1960	227		−18.1%
1970	396		74.4%
1980	622		57.1%
1990	558		−10.3%
2000	649		16.3%
2010	647		−0.3%
2020	545		−15.8%
U.S. Decennial Census

=== 2020 census ===
As of the 2020 census, Carney had a population of 545. The median age was 36.8 years. 25.0% of residents were under the age of 18 and 17.2% of residents were 65 years of age or older. For every 100 females there were 90.6 males, and for every 100 females age 18 and over there were 91.1 males age 18 and over.

0.0% of residents lived in urban areas, while 100.0% lived in rural areas.

There were 200 households in Carney, of which 40.5% had children under the age of 18 living in them. Of all households, 53.0% were married-couple households, 14.5% were households with a male householder and no spouse or partner present, and 25.5% were households with a female householder and no spouse or partner present. About 24.0% of all households were made up of individuals and 12.5% had someone living alone who was 65 years of age or older.

There were 223 housing units, of which 10.3% were vacant. The homeowner vacancy rate was 3.9% and the rental vacancy rate was 8.5%.

Racial composition as of the 2020 census
Race	Number	Percent
White	448	82.2%
Black or African American	7	1.3%
American Indian and Alaska Native	28	5.1%
Asian	3	0.6%
Native Hawaiian and Other Pacific Islander	0	0.0%
Some other race	8	1.5%
Two or more races	51	9.4%
Hispanic or Latino (of any race)	23	4.2%

=== 2000 census ===
As of the census of 2000, there were 649 people, 252 households, and 183 families living in the town. The population density was 367.4 inhabitants per square mile (141.9/km^{2}). There were 281 housing units at an average density of 159.1 per square mile (61.4/km^{2}). The racial makeup of the town was 86.75% White, 1.08% African American, 8.01% Native American, 0.62% from other races, and 3.54% from two or more races. Hispanic or Latino of any race were 1.23% of the population.

There were 252 households, out of which 34.9% had children under the age of 18 living with them, 53.6% were married couples living together, 14.3% had a female householder with no husband present, and 27.0% were non-families. 24.6% of all households were made up of individuals, and 9.1% had someone living alone who was 65 years of age or older. The average household size was 2.58 and the average family size was 3.03.

In the town, the population was spread out, with 31.0% under the age of 18, 6.8% from 18 to 24, 29.0% from 25 to 44, 23.3% from 45 to 64, and 10.0% who were 65 years of age or older. The median age was 35 years. For every 100 females, there were 93.7 males. For every 100 females age 18 and over, there were 88.2 males.

The median income for a household in the town was $27,589, and the median income for a family was $29,688. Males had a median income of $25,972 versus $20,000 for females. The per capita income for the town was $12,020. About 16.1% of families and 19.6% of the population were below the poverty line, including 23.7% of those under age 18 and 11.9% of those age 65 or over.

== Education ==
The community is served by Carney Public Schools #105 school district.
