= Oklahoma Housing Finance Agency =

- Great Seal of Oklahoma

Agency overview
- Formed: 1975
- Headquarters: 100 Northwest 63rd Oklahoma City, Oklahoma
- Employees: 112 FTE (FY2014)
- Annual budget: $186 million
- Minister responsible: Larry Parman, Secretary of Commerce and Tourism
- Agency executive: Deborah Jenkins, Executive Director
- Parent agency: Oklahoma Housing Finance Agency Board of Trustees
- Website: Oklahoma Housing Finance Agency

The Oklahoma Housing Finance Agency (OHFA) is a non-profit organization which serves the people of Oklahoma by offering affordable housing resources, including loans and rent assistance. OHFA was created in 1975 when Governor of Oklahoma David L. Boren approved the agency's first trust indenture. OHFA is a public trust with the State of Oklahoma as the beneficiary. The Trust was established to better the housing stock and the housing conditions in the State of Oklahoma and administers the Section 8 housing program along with other housing programs for the State.

While it is affiliated with the State of Oklahoma, OHFA does not operate using legislative funds. The exception being the Oklahoma Housing Stability Program.

== Leadership ==
The Housing Finance Agency is overseen by a 5-member Board of Trustees as appointed by the Governor of Oklahoma on staggering terms. Day-to-day operations of the Agency are under the direction of the OHFA Executive Director. Deborah Jenkins is currently serving as the Executive Director, having served in the position since 2017.

== Board of trustees ==
OHFA is governed by a five-member Board of Trustees appointed by the Governor of Oklahoma. The five members serve staggered five-year terms. The Governor also appoints one additional member to the Board who is a resident of public housing.

As of August 2025, the Board of Trustees is as follows:

Office	Incumbent
Chair	Michael Buhl
Vice Chair	Scott McLaws
Secretary-Treasurer	vacant
Trustee	Cliff Miller
Trustee	Darin Dalbom
Resident Member	Joi Love

== History ==
OHFA started with 12 district field agents hired to implement the Rental Assistance program. OHFA has since grown to a multimillion-dollar agency with over 100 employees administering nine housing programs. From the manual days of processing paperwork to automated computer days, OHFA has grown from helping 3,500 families annually to helping over 25,000 with 11 different housing programs in recent years.

== Functions ==
Through the OHFA Homebuyer Down Payment Assistance program, OHFA works with participating mortgage lenders to provide 30-year fixed-rate loans at below market rates. OHFA also offers new construction loans. Housing Development programs such as Affordable Housing Tax credits and the HOME Investment Partnerships program help non-profits and communities to build and revitalize affordable housing.

OHFA administers the Housing Choice Voucher program for low-income individuals and families in need of assistance in paying rent.

== Budget ==
OHFA has annual revenues over $180 million. The vast majority (63%) of OHFA revenue derives from federal funding from the United States Department of Housing and Urban Development. The other major revenues come from OHFA program loans (25%) and program fees (6%). The remainder comes from miscellaneous sources.

Expenditures are divided between interests on outstanding bonds (22%), the administration of OHFA (6%), and expenses related to federal programs administered by OHFA (69%). The remaining is associated with other program expenses.

== Organization ==
- OHFA Board
  - Executive Director
    - Administration - responsible for providing central administrative services to the Agency
    - Rental Assistance - responsible for administering OHFA's statewide Section 8 Housing Choice Voucher Rental Assistance Program. OHFA also operates the Performance Based Contract Administration which provide assistance to low-income families
    - Finance - responsible for overseeing all Agency financials and audits
    - Housing Development - responsible for implementing the Housing Tax Credits Program, HOME Program, Housing Trust Fund among others
    - Single Family - responsible for the OHFA Homebuyer Down Payment Assistance Program

== Awards ==
OHFA has been recognized with an Oklahoma Quality Award and is a member of the National Conference of State Housing Agencies.
