= Oklahoma Employment Security Commission =

Government agency

- Great Seal of Oklahoma

Agency overview
- Formed: 1941
- Headquarters: Frates Building; 5005 N. Lincoln Blvd, Oklahoma City, Oklahoma
- Employees: 792 (fiscal year 2010)
- Ministers responsible: Deby Snodgrass, Secretary of Commerce and Tourism; Vacant, Deputy Secretary of Commerce for Workforce Development; Rachel Hutchings, Chair of the Board
- Agency executives: Richard McPherson, Executive Director; Teresa Keller, Esq., Deputy Director
- Website: Oklahoma Employment Security Commission

The Oklahoma Employment Security Commission (OESC) is an independent agency of the state of Oklahoma responsible for providing employment services to the citizens of Oklahoma. The commission is part of a national network of employment service agencies and is funded by money from the United States Department of Labor. The commission is also responsible for administering the Workforce Investment Act of 1998 on behalf of the state.

The commission is composed of five members appointed by the governor of Oklahoma, with the approval of the Oklahoma Senate. All members serve six-year terms. The commission appoints an executive director, who serves at the pleasure of the commission, to act as the executive head of the commission. The current executive director is Richard McPherson, who has held that position since January 2011.

The commission was established in 1941 during the term of Governor Leon C. Phillips.

== History and functions ==
The commission was created by the Oklahoma Legislature in 1941. The commission is responsible for operating local workforce centers throughout the state. These centers provide testing, career counseling and placement services for job seekers; solicits job orders from employers; refers job seekers to jobs; and maintains a statewide online job listing databank. The commission also administers a number of programs that provide employment-related assistance for specific groups, such as dislocated workers, long-term unemployed adults and youth.

The commission has responsibility for collecting unemployment insurance taxes from Oklahoma employers to fund payment of unemployment benefits to jobless workers. The commission, in cooperation with the Bureau of Labor Statistics, manages a number of research programs that provide current labor market information to employers, job seekers, employment and guidance counselors, and students to assist them in making informed decisions.

== Leadership ==
The commission is under the supervision of the Secretary of Commerce and Tourism. Under Governor of Oklahoma Kevin Stitt and David Ostrowe is serving as the Secretary.

=== Commission members ===
The commission is composed of five members appointed by the governor of Oklahoma, with the approval of the Oklahoma Senate. Two members represent employers, two represent employees, and one represents the public. The representative of the public serves as the chair of the commission. All members serve six-year terms.

As of September 2018, the commission is composed of the following members:

Representing the Public

- Rachel Hutchings – Chair

Representing Employers

- David Adams, Commissioner
- Karen Hudson, Commissioner

Representing Employees

- Jim Quillen, Commissioner
- Duchess Bartmess, Commissioner

== Organization ==
=== Internal structure ===
- Employment Security Commission
  - Executive Director
    - Deputy Director
      - Associate Director
        - Workforce Services Division
        - Unemployment Insurance Division
        - Economic Research and Analysis Division

=== Workforce Services Division ===
The Workforce Services Division has two main functions: provide guidance for field staff and field activities at local workforce centers across the state and maintain a statewide labor exchange between employers and job-seeking individuals as established by the Wagner-Peyser Act of 1933. Assistance may be provided to individuals in the form of referral to jobs, referral to supportive services, training assistance, or job development. The Veterans Services Division provides service to Oklahoma veterans through Veterans Representatives located in local offices and out-stationed at key service delivery points across the state.

Workforce Services is responsible for administering the Workforce Investment Act of 1998 (WIA). These WIA programs are federally funded and designed to provide employment and training services to individuals who, for various reasons, have been unable to obtain meaningful employment. This includes responsibility for administering programs that prepare youth and unskilled adults for entry into the labor force. The program also provides job training opportunities to economically disadvantaged individuals and those dislocated due to business closings and layoffs. The Workforce Investment Act also mandates the development of a comprehensive workforce system that includes many other workforce-related programs. To accomplish this goal, the division, in partnership with the Oklahoma Department of Commerce, serves as the administrative staff to the State Workforce Investment Board. The Board is charged with the responsibility of making recommendations regarding the development of this comprehensive system.

=== Unemployment Insurance Division ===
The Unemployment Insurance Division is responsible for paying unemployment benefits to qualified unemployed wage earners. OESC makes rigorous efforts to locate suitable employment opportunities and /or provide re-employment assistance so those individuals receiving unemployment benefits may re-enter the workforce as quickly as possible. The Unemployment Insurance Division maintains the Unemployment Insurance program which was established through the Social Security Act of 1935. Unemployment benefits are paid as a weekly sum to qualified unemployed wage earners covered under the law. Funds for payment of these benefits are provided through a state tax paid by employers and deposited in a state-specific trust fund. Administrative funding for the program is provided through the federal FUTA taxes paid by employers for that purpose.

=== Economic Research and Analysis Division ===
The Economic Research and Analysis Division is responsible for collecting, analyzing and disseminating a wide array of socio-economic, employment-related data. The division maintains Bureau of Labor Statistics programs such as Current Employment Statistics (CES), Occupational Employment Statistics (OES) and Local Area Unemployment Statistics (LAUS). In addition to these programs, this division also maintains a number of other Labor Market Information (LMI) programs, such as the Occupational Wage Survey Reports and Industry & Occupational Projections. These products and services are requested by a diverse group of customers who need or desire to track the economic health of the state of Oklahoma and its local areas.

== Staffing ==
The Employment Security Commission had an annual non-appropriated agency budget of almost $128.7 million in fiscal year 2011. The agency is one of the larger employers among Oklahoma state agencies, with 792 full-time employees in fiscal year 2010.

Division	Number of Employees
Administration	64.1
Unemployment Insurance	342.7
Employment Services	27.5
Research	24.3
Field Services	268.9
Employment and Training	19.1
Data Processing	45.7
Total	792.3
