= Oklahoma Department of Labor =

Oklahoma state agency

- Great Seal of Oklahoma

Agency overview
- Formed: November 17, 1907
- Headquarters: 3017 N. Stiles; Oklahoma City, Oklahoma
- Employees: 86
- Annual budget: $7.3 million
- Agency executive: Leslie Osborn, Labor Commissioner
- Website: Oklahoma Department of Labor

The Oklahoma Department of Labor (ODOL) is an agency of the government of Oklahoma that is headed by the Oklahoma Labor Commissioner, a statewide elected position. ODOL is responsible for supervising the administration of all state laws relating to labor and workplace safety and gathers and publishes information about the workforce of Oklahoma.

The present Commissioner of Labor is Leslie Osborn who was elected by the people in November 2018 and took office January 2019.

== Responsibilities ==
The ODOL is responsible for the administration and enforcement of the State's minimum wage law, enforces the State's child labor laws, oversees that State's workers’ compensation insurance compliance program, and investigates and mediates of unpaid wages disputes.

Additionally, the ODOL has jurisdiction for the inspection of welded steam lines, boiler and pressure vessels, elevators, amusement and water rides, and water heaters in public facilities. The Department is responsible for the certification of welders and weld-testing laboratories as well as the regulation and certification of asbestos workers. The ODOL is also the primary enforcement agency of occupational safety and health for public employees across the State.

== History ==
In August 1907 delegates from the Twin-Territorial Federation of Labor, the State Farmers' Union, and the Railroad Brotherhoods met in Shawnee and formulated a list of 24 demands for the forthcoming constitutional convention. The 12th demand called for the establishment of State Department of Labor and Commerce.

Consequently, when the new state constitution was ratified by delegates to the constitutional convention in 1907 the Oklahoma Department of Labor was created. Since its inception, the Oklahoma Department of Labor has functioned continuously for more than 100 years under the direction of 18 different Commissioners and 22 governors.

Oklahoma's first Commissioner of Labor was Charles A. Daugherty, who served for two four-year terms from 1907 to 1915, under Governors C.N. Haskell and Lee Cruce. At that time, the Labor Department was located in Guthrie, as were all state agencies. The original staff consisted of five people: a commissioner; an assistant commissioner; a state factory inspector; a superintendent of the State Free Employment Bureau; and a stenographer.

Due largely to the infusion of federal funds from Wagner-Peyser and Social Security grants, the Oklahoma Employment Service and the Unemployment Compensation and Placement Division of the Oklahoma Department of Labor had grown to include more than 300 employees in 33 offices throughout the state by 1940. Federal grants accounted for 85 percent of the funds budgeted for these activities.

Then, in 1941, the 18th Legislature amended the Oklahoma Unemployment Compensation Law extensively, changing the name to the Oklahoma Security Act, and renamed administration of the Act from the Commissioner of Labor to the Oklahoma Employment Security Commission. By FY 1940-41, the Department of Labor had been reduced to 16 employees operating on only 11 percent of the previous year's budget.

Today the Department of Labor has an authorized staff of 86 with one office in Oklahoma City, Oklahoma. The present Commissioner of Labor is Lesie Orborn who was elected by the people in November 2018 and took office January 2019.

== Divisions ==
As the head of the Department of Labor, the Labor Commissioner supervises, directs, and controls the following agencies Labor Divisions:

- Commissioner of Labor
  - Deputy Commissioner
    - Administration Division - provides administrative support and handles the business functions of the Department, including responsibility for communications, finance and accounting, human resources, purchasing, research, agency legal services, legislative affairs and constituent services, information technology and data processing services, mail and reception
      - Finance Unit
      - Legal Affairs Unit
      - Information Technology Unit
    - Asbestos Abatement Division - responsible for ensuring asbestos abatement projects are accomplished safely and in accordance with the law, and also administers an Environmental Protection Agency (EPA) grant program to manage asbestos hazards in schools
    - Employment Standards Division
      - Child Labor Unit - responsible for enforcement of Oklahoma's Child Labor statutes
      - Wage and Hour Unit - responsible for processing all wage claims under the Labor Department's jurisdiction
    - Public Employee Occupational Safety and Health Division (PEOSH) - provides consultation and enforcement services to public sector employers to protect public employees from workplace accidents and injuries.
    - Safety Pay OSHA Consultation Division - provides free, confidential, voluntary and non-punitive safety and health consultation services to private sector employers in the state
    - Safety Standards Division - regulates the installation, operation and maintenance of boilers, pressure vessels, hot water heaters and amusement rides, and also regulates welding practices
    - Licensing Division - handles State-wide licensing for asbestos, welding, weld test facilities and weld inspectors, amusements, alarm, locksmith, fire sprinkler, elevator, alternative fuels, and boilers/pressure vessels.
    - Statistical Research Analysis Division - responsible for conducting occupational safety and health surveys in conjunction with the United States Department of Labor's Bureau of Labor Statistics and for providing incident and research information to assist safety officials with their safety programs.

== Staffing ==
The Labor Department, with an annual budget of just over $7 million, is one of the smaller employers of the State. For fiscal year 2018, the Department was authorized 86 full-time employees.

Division	Number of Employees
Administration	11
Asbestos Abatement	4
Regulation and Enforcement	45
Statistical Research and Licensing	1
Occupational Safety and Health	18
Total	86

== See also ==
- Oklahoma Labor Commissioner
- Governor of Oklahoma
- Oklahoma Employment Security Commission
