= Oklahoma Department of Commerce =

State agency of Oklahoma, U.S.

- Department of Commerce logo

Agency overview
- Formed: 1987
- Preceding agency: Department of Economic and Community Affairs
- Headquarters: 900 N Stiles Avenue Oklahoma City
- Employees: 92 (FY18)
- Annual budget: $85 million (FY18)
- Minister responsible: Deborah Moorad, Oklahoma Secretary of Commerce
- Agency executive: John Budd, Chief Executive Officer
- Website: www.okcommerce.gov

The Oklahoma Department of Commerce is a department of the government of Oklahoma under the Oklahoma secretary of commerce. The department is responsible for the supporting local communities, stimulating growth of the existing businesses, attracting new business, and promoting the development and availability of a skilled workforce. The department is the lead agency for economic development in the state. The department is led by and under the control of a director appointed by the governor of Oklahoma, with the approval of the Oklahoma Senate, to serve at the pleasure of the governor.

The current cabinet secretary is Deborah Moorad and the current CEO is John Budd. Both of them were appointed by Governor Kevin Stitt in March 2025.

The Department of Commerce was established in 1987 during the term of Governor Henry Bellmon.

== Mission ==
To increase the quantity and quality of jobs available in Oklahoma by:

- Supporting communities;
- Supporting the growth of existing businesses and entrepreneurs;
- Attracting new businesses; and
- Promoting the development and availability of a skilled workforce.

== Leadership ==
The department is led by the Secretary of Commerce and the director of the Department of Commerce. Under Governor of Oklahoma Kevin Stitt, Deborah Moorad is serving in the Secretary position.

== Organization ==
- Cabinet Secretary
- Director
  - Deputy Director
    - Business Customer Services Division
      - Business Development Services - responsible for the retention and creation of jobs in existing businesses
      - International Trade Promotion - responsible for promoting export trade and the attraction of foreign direct investment
        - Mexico City, Mexico Trade Office
    - Community Development Division
      - Community Development Services - responsible for providing technical assistance to and financial investment in local communities
      - Main Street Center - responsible for providing training and technical assistance for preservation-based commercial district revitalization
    - National Recruitment Division - responsible for recruiting new business investment
    - Research and Analysis Division - responsible for providing information and analysis on State's business climate, tax incentives, and business advantages
  - Deputy Director and General Counsel
    - Executive Services Division - provides administrative support services to entire Department
    - Human Resources Division - provides all personnel services for Department
    - Financial Affairs Division - provides financial services to the Department
  - Deputy Secretary of Commerce for Workforce Solutions
    - Workforce Development Division

== Staffing ==
The Commerce Department, with an annual budget of $100 million, is one of the smaller employers of the state. For fiscal year 2018, the department was authorized 92 full-time employees in FY2014.

Program	Number of Employees
Administration Executive Services Human Resources Financial Services	43
Community Development Community Development Services Main Street Center	32
Business Promotion Business Development Services International Trade Promotion	20
Business Recruitment	8
Research and Analysis	10
Workforce Services	12
Total	125

== Budget ==
The Commerce Department has an annual budget of several hundred million dollars, making it one of the smaller appropriated agencies of the State. For fiscal year 2011, the department's budget consists of 20% in annual appropriations and 80% in federal grants. The department's divisions have the following budgets:

Division	Budget (in millions)
Operational Support	$8.4
Community Development	$22.8
Global Business	$4.3
Economic Development Contracts	$265.6
Total	$300.6

== Supporting Agencies ==
- Oklahoma Housing Finance Agency
- Oklahoma Department of Labor
- Native American Cultural & Educational Authority of Oklahoma
- Oklahoma Economic Development Databases
- Oklahoma Space Industry Development Authority
