= Oklahoma Secretary of Human Resources and Administration =

- Great Seal of Oklahoma

Agency overview
- Formed: June 6, 1986
- Preceding agencies: Secretary of Administration; Secretary of Human Resources
- Dissolved: January 1, 2012
- Superseding agency: Oklahoma Secretary of Finance and Revenue
- Headquarters: 2101 N Lincoln Boulevard; Oklahoma City, Oklahoma
- Employees: 517 (FY2011)
- Annual budget: $60 million (FY2011)
- Ministers responsible: Oscar B. Jackson Jr., Secretary; Col. John Richard (ret.), Deputy Secretary
- Child agencies: Oklahoma Office of Personnel Management; Oklahoma Department of Central Services
- Website: Office of the Secretary of Human Resources and Administration

The Oklahoma Secretary of Human Resources and Administration was a member of the Oklahoma Governor's Cabinet. Prior to its dissolution in 2012, the Secretary was appointed by the Governor of Oklahoma, with the consent of the Oklahoma Senate, to serve at the pleasure of the Governor. The Secretary served as the chief advisor to the Governor on managing the operations and personnel needs of the State government.

The last Secretary of Human Resources and Administration was Oscar B. Jackson Jr., who was appointed by Democratic Governor Brad Henry in 2003 and retained by Republican Governor Mary Fallin in 2011. Previous to his service in this position, he served as Secretary of Human Resources from 1991 to 2003 under Democratic Governor David Walters and Republican Governor Frank Keating.

== History ==
The position of Secretary of Human Resources and Administration was established in 2003 when Governor Brad Henry issued an executive order merging the former positions of Secretary of Human Resources and Secretary of Administration into a single position. Previously, both positions had existed separately since 1986 when they were established by the Executive Branch Reform Act of 1986. In 2011, the Oklahoma Legislature passed the Government Administrative Process Consolidation and Reorganization Act of 2011. This Act consolidated the duties and responsibilities of the Secretary into those of the Oklahoma Secretary of Finance and Revenue, thereby eliminating the position.

Oklahoma state law allows for Cabinet Secretaries to serve concurrently as the head of a State agency in addition to their duties as a Cabinet Secretary. Historically, the Secretary of Human Resources and Administration has also served as the Administrator of the Oklahoma Office of Personnel Management. As of 2010, all Secretaries of Human Resources and Administration have served in that dual position.

== Responsibilities ==
The Secretary of Human Resources and Administration was responsible for providing services to help manage and support the basic functioning of all state agencies. These services included personnel management, central purchasing, state motor pool management, building maintenance and construction, as well as central printing and mailing. The Secretary also oversaw the licensing, supervision and regulation of most professions and occupation that are regulated by the State government.

== Agencies overseen ==
The Secretary of Human Resources and Administration oversees the following state entities:

- Accountancy Board
- Alternative Fuels Technician Examiners Hearing Board
- Architects and Landscape Architects Board
- Athletic Trainers Advisory Committee
- Board of Licensed Social Workers
- Certified Public Manager Advisory Board
- Chiropractic Examiners Board
- Dentistry Board
- Department of Central Services
  - State Capitol Preservation Commission
  - Oklahoma Capitol Improvement Authority
  - Capitol-Medical Center Improvement and Zoning Commission and Citizens Advisory Committee
  - State Use Committee
  - Public Employees Relations Board
- Dietetic Registration Advisory Committee
- Electrologists Advisory Committee
- Embalmers and Funeral Directors Board
- Engineers and Land Surveyors, Board of Registration
- Horse Racing Commission
- Human Rights Commission
- Medical Licensure and Supervision Board
- Merit Protection Commission
- Motor Vehicle Commission
- Nurse Anesthetist Formulary Advisory Council
- Nurse Formulary Advisory Council
- Nursing Board and Advisory Council
- Occupational Therapy Advisory Committee
- Office of Personnel Management
  - Affirmative Action Review Council
  - Governor’s Advisory Council on Asian-American Affairs
  - Governor’s Advisory Council on Latin American and Hispanic Affairs
  - Governor's Ethnic American Advisory Council
  - Committee for Incentive Awards for State Employees
  - Mentor Selection Advisory Committee
  - Oversight Committee for State Employee Charitable Contributions
  - Employee Assistance Program Advisory Council
- Oklahoma Commission on the Status of Women
- Optometry Examiners Board
- Osteopathic Examiners Board
- Perfusionists Board of Examiners
- Pharmacy Board
- Physical Therapy Committee
- Physician’s Assistant Advisory Committee
- Podiatric Medical Examiners Board
- Psychologist Board of Examiners
- Real Estate Appraiser Board
- Real Estate Commission
- Respiratory Care Advisory Committee
- Sanitarian Registration Advisory Council
- Savings & Loan Advisory Council
- Speech Pathology and Audiology Board of Examiners
- State Board of Cosmetology
- State Employee Child Day Care Advisory Committee
- State Employees Benefits Council
- State/Education Employees Group Insurance Board
- Used Motor Vehicle & Parts Commission
- Veterinary Medical Examiners Board

== Salary ==
The annual salary of the Secretary of Human Resources and Administration was set by law at $75,000.

== List of secretaries ==
Secretary of Human Resources (1986–2003)

Name	Took office	Left office	Governor served under
Oscar B. Jackson Jr.	1991	1995	David Walters
Oscar B. Jackson Jr.	1995	2003	Frank Keating

Secretary of Administration (1986–2003)

Name	Took office	Left office	Governor served under
Tom Brennan	1995	1997	Frank Keating
Pam Warren	1997	2003	Frank Keating

Secretary of Human Resources and Administration (2003–2012)

#	Name	Took office	Left office	Governor served under
1	Oscar B. Jackson Jr.	2003	2011	Brad Henry
1	Oscar B. Jackson Jr.	2011	2012	Mary Fallin
