= Russell M. Perry =

Oklahoma Secretary of Economic Development and Special Affairs
- In office May 2000 – May 2001
- Governor: Frank Keating
- Preceded by: Himself as Secretary of Commerce
- Succeeded by: Post abolished Kathy Taylor as Secretary of Commerce

Oklahoma Secretary of Commerce
- In office 1999–2000
- Governor: Frank Keating
- Preceded by: Howard Barnett Jr.
- Succeeded by: Himself as Secretary of Economic Development and Special Affairs

Personal details
- Party: Republican
- Occupation: Businessman
- Website: Perry Publishing and Broadcasting Company

Russell M. Perry is an American businessman, banker, publisher, and broadcaster from Oklahoma. Perry served as the Oklahoma Secretary of Commerce from 1999 to 2000, having been appointed by governor of Oklahoma Frank Keating. Perry was the first African American to hold that position. After being nominated by Keating, Perry was never confirmed by the Oklahoma Senate. Perry's appointment became a central issue in the 2001 Oklahoma Supreme Court case Keating v. Edmondson.

"I'm the Maverick. If you tell me it can't be done. I'm gonna try it." Russell M. Perry

== Corporate career ==
Perry started the Black Chronicle in 1979, a statewide newspaper based out of Oklahoma City, Oklahoma that focuses on the African community in Oklahoma. At the same time, Perry founded and become the President of Perry Publishing and Broadcasting Company, which is a print media, cable television and radio broadcasting corporation. Perry Publishing owns radio stations KVSP and KRMP in Oklahoma City, KJMM and KGTO in Tulsa, among others.

Perry would later come to own the controlling interest in First Security Bank of Oklahoma City.

On the 7th of April 2025 the Oklahoma Senate passed Senate Resolution 13, honoring Russell M. Perry for his remarkable contributions to the state as a businessman, banker, and journalist. Authored and presented by Senator Shane Jett, state of Oklahoma, who is the state senator from Senate District 17, which includes northern Pottawatomie County and eastern Oklahoma County. The resolution commended Perry for founding The Black Chronicle and establishing Perry Publishing & Broadcasting, now Oklahoma’s largest independent radio group.

== Keating Administration ==
=== Commerce Secretary ===
In 1999, following the resignation of Howard Barnett Jr., Governor of Oklahoma Frank Keating appointed Perry to serve as his third Oklahoma Secretary of Commerce, making Perry the first African American to ever serve in that position.

Perry served as Secretary in an unconfirmed basis while his Governor Keating sent his nomination to the Oklahoma Senate. Initially Perry's nomination was set to be heard by Senate Economic Development Committee, where the nominations of Dean Werries, Ron Rosenfeld and Howard Barnett Jr. (Keating's former Secretaries of Commerce) had been heard. However, President pro tempore of the Oklahoma Senate Stratton Taylor (at the request of State Senator Angela Monson) transferred his nomination to the Senate Finance Committee, which Senator Monson chaired. Though 10 members of the 15 member committee favored Perry's appointment, Senator Monson blocked the nomination by never allowing it to be heard before the Finance Committee. Ultimately, the Oklahoma Senate adjourned without ever hearing Perry's nomination.

Governor Keating and Perry claimed that the reason Perry's nomination was not heard was because he was a conservative Republican African American. They claimed that the move was done at the request of the Legislative Black Caucus, all member of which were Democrats. Senator Monson, however, said that Perry's salary as Commerce Secretary would cost the State too much and be duplicative.

In 2025, Perry was officially recognized as a Commerce Secretary through a resolution made by Senator Shane Jett. The measure passed 45-0 and Governor Keating, as well as Perry's family, were present for the resolution.

=== Economic Development Secretary ===
After Perry spent a year in political limbo, in May 2000 Governor Keating issued executive order 2000–11 which abolished the position of Secretary of Commerce and established the position of Secretary of Economic Development and Special Affairs. Keating then nominated Perry to the new position, which Perry would serve in on a voluntary basis.

On June 8, 2000, Senator Monson submitted a request for an official opinion to Attorney General of Oklahoma Drew Edmondson concerning Keating's actions. Edmondson issued Attorney General Opinion 2000–54 on October 26, 2000, in which Edmondson found Keating's actions against the provisions of the Executive Branch Reform Act of 1986. Governor Keating then filed a petition on October 27, 2000, in Oklahoma County District Court to overturn Edmondson's opinion. After hearing oral arguments, the trial judge upheld the Attorney General's opinion.

On December 29, 2000, Keating appealed a single issue – whether a Governor is empowered to reorganize the executive cabinet throughout the term of office. The appeal was sent to the Oklahoma Supreme Court for consideration.

In May 2001, Keating withdraw Perry's nomination for consideration as Economic Development Secretary and instead appointed Perry as his Special Adviser for Economic Development, which is a non-cabinet-level post.

=== Keating v. Edmondson ===
The Supreme Court decided the case of Keating v. Edmondson on December 4, 2001. In a unanimous decision, the Court rejected the Governor's appeal and upheld Edmondson's opinion. Chief Justice Rudolph Hargrave authored the majority opinion and was joined by Justices Watt, Hodges, Lavender, Opala, Kauger, Summers, and Boudreau. Justice Winchester wrote a concurring opinion to the majority. Noting that the legislative intent was clear and not ambiguous, the Court rejected the Governor's position and found that state law provided the Governor no power to alter Cabinet positions at will.

== Personal life ==
In 2006, Perry was inducted into the Oklahoma Association of Broadcasters Hall of Fame. Perry was inducted into the Oklahoma Hall of Fame in 2013.

Political offices
Preceded by Howard Barnett Jr.	Oklahoma Secretary of Commerce; Under Governor Frank Keating; 1999–2000	Succeeded by Himself; As Secretary of Economic Development and Special Affairs
Preceded by Himself; As Secretary of Commerce	Oklahoma Secretary of Economic Development and Special Affairs; Under Governor Frank Keating; 2000–2001	Succeeded by Post abolished Kathy Taylor as Secretary of Commerce and Tourism
