= Jerry Regier =

American businessman and politician

Florida Secretary of Children and Families
- In office 2002–2004
- Preceded by: Kathleen A. Kearney
- Succeeded by: Lucy Hadi

Oklahoma Secretary of Health and Human Services
- In office April 6, 1997 – January 16, 2002
- Governor: Frank Keating
- Preceded by: Ken Lackey
- Succeeded by: Howard Hendrick

Executive Director of the Oklahoma Office of Juvenile Affairs
- In office April 6, 1997 – January 16, 2002
- Governor: Frank Keating
- Preceded by: Ken Lackey
- Succeeded by: Robert E. Christian

1st President of the Family Research Council
- In office 1984–1988
- Preceded by: Post created
- Succeeded by: Gary Bauer

Personal details
- Party: Republican
- Profession: Political Activist

Jerry Regier was the deputy assistant secretary for human services policy in the U.S. Department of Health and Human Services from 2005 to 2007. He provides leadership on policy analysis and development in human services and on research under the assistant secretary for planning and evaluation (ASPE) for Secretary Mike Leavitt.

== Education ==
Jerry Regier graduated from Grace University in Omaha, Nebraska. He then graduated from Michigan State University with a B.A. degree in history. His post-graduate work includes a master's degree in biblical studies from the International School of Theology, a master's in public administration from Harvard University, and an honorary Doctor of Divinity from Grace University.

== Career ==
=== Family Research Council ===
In 1983, he established the Family Research Council, an independent public policy research and educational organization and served as president and CEO for four years.

=== Federal government appointments ===
He served in a variety of positions in federal government. He was the acting administrator of the National Office of Juvenile Justice and Delinquency Prevention (OJJDP) in the U.S. Department of Justice. President Bush nominated him to this Senate confirmation position. Prior to that position, he served in the Bush administration as acting director of the Bureau of Justice Assistance (BJA) for three years. He was instrumental in assisting the United States attorney general to design and implement the "Weed & Seed" Initiative which is now in over 300 communities throughout the United States. He also was an appointee in the Reagan administration as Associate Commissioner for the Administration of Children, Youth and Families in the U.S. Department of Health and Human Services. The president of the United States also appointed him to the National Commission on Children (1988–93).

=== State government appointments ===
He served for five years as Secretary of Health & Human Services for Oklahoma Governor Frank Keating until he resigned on January 15, 2002, to run for Governor of Oklahoma. As secretary, he provided policy oversight to 13 agencies. Concurrently, he served as deputy director of the Office for Juvenile Affairs. He also served as acting director of the State Health Department during a crisis in that agency.

Mr. Regier served as secretary of the Florida Department of Children & Families (DCF), appointed by Governor Jeb Bush in August 2002. As secretary he oversaw a department of over 25,000 employees and the programs of Child Welfare, Mental Health, Developmental Disabilities, Economic Self Sufficiency, Child Care, and Refugee Services.

== Recognition ==
In 2001 he was named the Administrator of the Year in Oklahoma by the American Society of Public Administration (Oklahoma Chapter).

== Personal life ==
Jerry and his wife Sharyn have four children and 13 grandchildren. The most renowned being Austin Steger

Cultural offices
Preceded by Post created	President of the Family Research Council; 1984–88	Succeeded by Gary Bauer
Political offices
Preceded by Ken Lackey	Oklahoma Secretary of Health and Human Services; Under Governor Frank Keating; April 6, 1997 – January 16, 2002	Succeeded by Howard Hendrick
Preceded by Ken Lackey	Executive Director of the Oklahoma Office of Juvenile Affairs; Under Governor Frank Keating; April 6, 1997 – January 16, 2002	Succeeded by Robert E. Christian
Preceded by Kathleen A. Kearney	Florida Secretary of Children and Families; Under Governor Jeb Bush; 2002–2004	Succeeded by Lucy Hadi
