= Ken Lackey =

American businessman and politician

President of the University of Oklahoma-Tulsa
- In office August 1, 1999 – June 13, 2001
- Succeeded by: Ken Levit

Chief of Staff to Governor of Oklahoma Frank Keating
- In office April 6, 1997 – August 1, 1999
- Governor: Frank Keating
- Succeeded by: Howard Barnett Jr.

Oklahoma Secretary of Health and Human Services
- In office May 10, 1995 – April 6, 1997
- Governor: Frank Keating
- Succeeded by: Jerry Regier

Executive Director of the Oklahoma Office of Juvenile Affairs
- In office 1995 – April 6, 1997
- Governor: Frank Keating
- Preceded by: Post created
- Succeeded by: Jerry Regier

Personal details
- Born: 1943 (age 82–83)
- Party: Republican
- Education: University of Mississippi; University of Texas at Austin
- Profession: Businessman

Kenneth Lackey (born 1943) is an American businessman and politician from Oklahoma who formerly served as the president of the University of Oklahoma-Tulsa.

Lackey has previously served in numerous positions within the administration of Governor of Oklahoma Frank Keating, including Keating's chief of staff (1997–1999) and Oklahoma Secretary of Health and Human Services (1995–1997). In addition to his service as secretary, Lackey served concurrently as the executive director of the Oklahoma Office of Juvenile Affairs.

== Education and early career ==
Lackey earned his bachelor's degree in mathematics from the University of Mississippi in 1965, and a Master of Business Administration from the University of Texas at Austin in 1967. After leaving UT, Lakcey served in the United States Army for four years, leaving in 1969 with the rank of first lieutenant. For his service, he was awarded the Army Commendation Medal.

When Lackey left the Army, he moved to Tulsa and joined Skelly Oil Company, where he served in various financial and executive positions. He later accepted the position of vice-president and treasurer for Kin-Ark Corporation, a firm involved in chemicals, galvanizing and hotel management in Tulsa. In 1977, Lackey joined Flint Industries, Inc., a privately owned, oil and gas services and commercial construction company. He remained with that firm until 1995. While at Flint, Lackey served as chief financial officer, executive vice-president/chief operating officer, president, director and executive committee member for that firm.

While in Tulsa, Lackey served on numerous community boards. He was a member of the board of directors of the Tulsa Port of Catoosa as well as board chairman of the Tulsa Metropolitan Area Chamber of Commerce.

== Keating Administration ==
=== Health Secretary ===
In May 1995, Republican Governor of Oklahoma Frank Keating appointed Lackey to serve as his Secretary of Health and Human Services. As Health and Human Services Secretary, Lackey oversaw the Oklahoma State Department of Health, the Oklahoma Department of Human Services, the Oklahoma Department of Mental Health and Substance Abuse Services, the Oklahoma Department of Rehabilitation Services, and the Oklahoma Office of Juvenile Affairs.

In addition to his services as secretary, Lackey was appointed by Keating to be the first executive director of the Oklahoma Office of Juvenile Affairs.

=== Chief of staff ===
Lackey served as secretary until 1997, when Keating appointed him as his chief of staff. Keating appointed Jerry Regier to succeed Lackey. As chief of staff, Lackey served as Keating's top advisor.

== University of Oklahoma ==
Lackey resigned as Keating's chief of staff in 1999 to become the president of the University of Oklahoma-Tulsa. He was succeeded in that position by Ken Levit

Political offices
Preceded by	Oklahoma Secretary of Health and Human Services; Under Governor Frank Keating; May 10, 1995 – April 6, 1997	Succeeded by Jerry Regier
Preceded by	Executive Director of the Oklahoma Office of Juvenile Affairs; Under Governor Frank Keating; May 10, 1995 – April 6, 1997	Succeeded by Jerry Regier
Preceded by Clinton Key	Chief of Staff to Governor Frank Keating; April 6, 1997 – August 1, 1999	Succeeded by Howard Barnett Jr.
Academic offices
Preceded by	President of the University of Oklahoma-Tulsa; August 1, 1999 – unknown	Succeeded by Gerald P. Clancy
