= 2002 Oklahoma lieutenant gubernatorial election =

- November 5, 2002
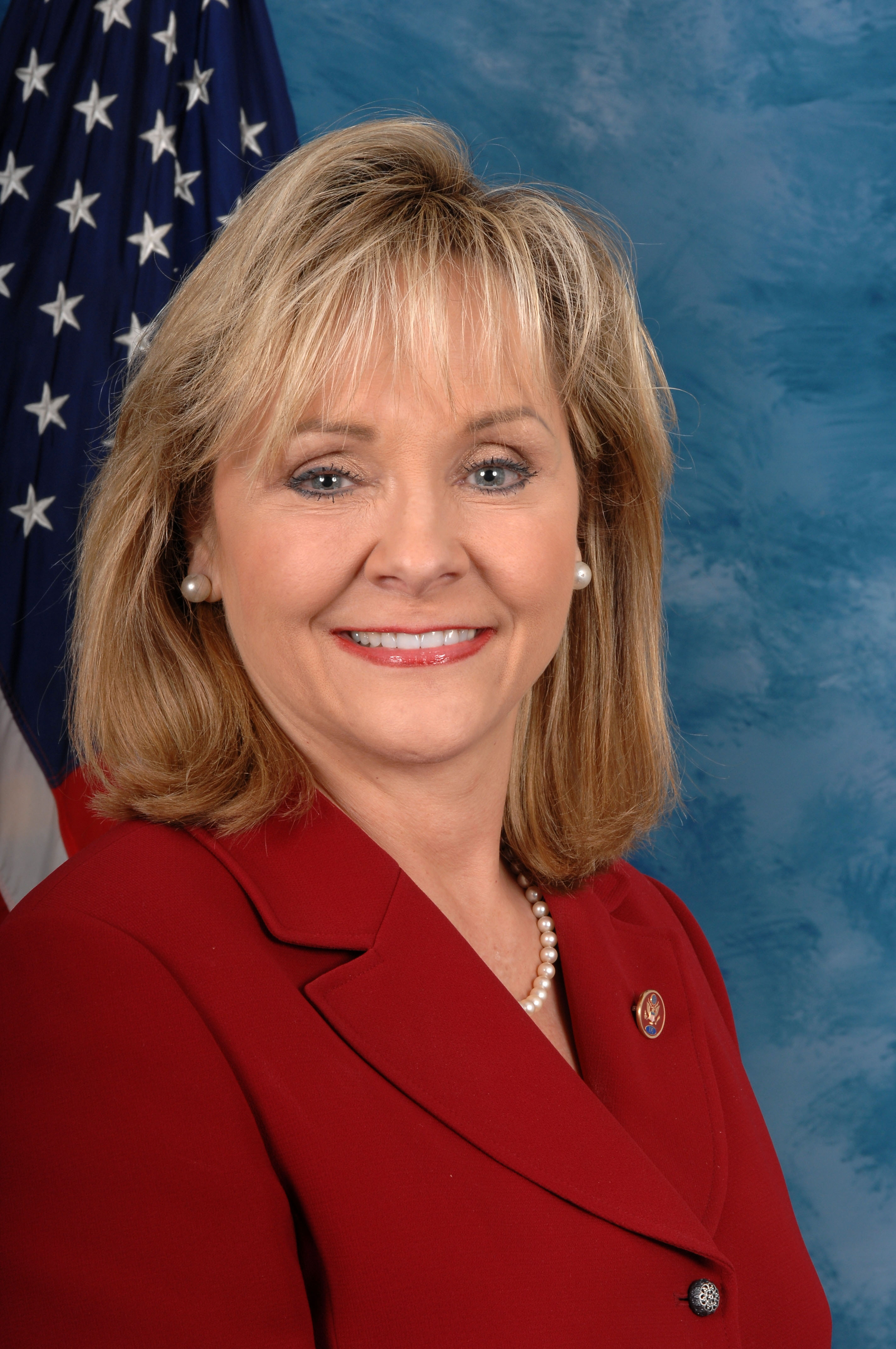

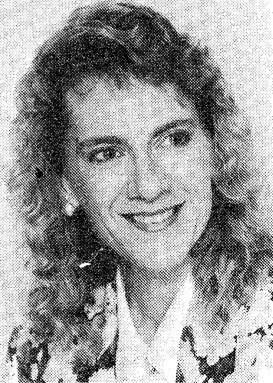
Nominee	Mary Fallin	Laura Boyd
Party	Republican	Democratic
Popular vote	584,990	400,511
Percentage	56.88%	38.95%
- County results Fallin: 40–50% 50–60% 60–70% 70–80% Boyd: 40–50% 50–60% 60–70%
Lieutenant Governor before election
Mary Fallin
Republican
Elected Lieutenant Governor
Mary Fallin
Republican

The 2002 Oklahoma lieutenant gubernatorial election was held on November 5, 2002, to elect the Lieutenant Governor of Oklahoma, concurrently with elections to the United States Senate, U.S. House of Representatives, governor, and other state and local elections. Primary elections were held on August 27, 2002, with runoff elections held on September 17 in races where no single candidate cleared at least 50% of the vote.

Incumbent Republican lieutenant governor Mary Fallin ran for re-election to a third term in office after previously stating she was considering a run for governor. Fallin defeated former Democratic state representative and 1998 gubernatorial nominee Laura Boyd, along with two independent candidates, in the general election.

== Republican primary ==
=== Candidates ===
==== Nominee ====
- Mary Fallin, incumbent lieutenant governor (1995–present)

==== Eliminated in primary ====
- Jim Clark, vocational teacher

=== Endorsements ===
Mary Fallin

Newspapers and other media

- The Oklahoman

=== Results ===
Republican primary results
Party	Candidate	Votes	%
Republican	Mary Fallin (incumbent)	168,461	81.96
Republican	Jim Clark	37,068	18.04
Total votes		205,529	100.0

== Democratic primary ==
=== Candidates ===
==== Nominee ====
- Laura Boyd, state representative from the 44th district (1993–1999) and nominee for governor in 1998

=== Results ===
Democratic primary results
Party	Candidate	Votes	%
Democratic	Laura Boyd	Unopposed	
Total votes		—N/a	100.0

== General election ==
=== Endorsements ===
Mary Fallin (R)

Newspapers and other media

- The Oklahoman

=== Results ===
2002 Oklahoma lieutenant gubernatorial election
Party	Candidate	Votes	%
Republican	Mary Fallin (incumbent)	584,990	56.88
Democratic	Laura Boyd	400,511	38.95
Independent	Billy Maguire	31,053	3.02
Independent	E.Z. Million	11,802	1.15
Total votes		1,028,356	100.0
Republican hold			
