= Edward H. Cook =

Oklahoma Secretary of Tourism and Recreation
- In office 1995–1999
- Governor: Frank Keating
- Succeeded by: Jane Anne Jayroe

Director of the Oklahoma Department of Tourism and Recreation
- In office 1995–1999
- Governor: Frank Keating
- Succeeded by: Jane Anne Jayroe

President of the Greater Oklahoma City Chamber
- In office 1980–1987

Personal details
- Born: January 10, 1935
- Died: March 3, 2021 (aged 86) Oklahoma City
- Party: Republican
- Education: Yale University
- Occupation: Businessman

Edward H. "Ed" Cook (January 10, 1935 – March 3, 2021) was an American businessman from Oklahoma. Cook held numerous positions with the Greater Oklahoma City Chamber, that City's chamber of commerce, serving as that organization's president. After a return to the private sector, Governor of Oklahoma Frank Keating appointed him as his Secretary of Tourism and Recreation in 1995. Serving in that position until 1999, Cook oversaw all efforts to promote Oklahoma as a tourism destination.

== Education ==
Cook received his bachelor's degree from Yale University in political science and economics.

== OKC Chamber of Commerce ==
Cook worked for several years with the Greater Oklahoma City Chamber, that City's chamber of commerce. The Chamber is a not-for-profit business federation that advocates and provides services for the 4,500 members in the greater Oklahoma City region. While with the Chamber, he served as the volunteer president from 1974 to 1975, and served again as assistant vice president. The Chamber later hired him to serve as the President and chief executive officer of the Chamber from 1980 to 1987.

During his tenure as president and CEO, the Chamber had a contract with Oklahoma City to spend income from the city's hotel-motel tax to promote tourism events and generate jobs in the tourism industry. While President, Cook helped recruit a General Motors assembly plant and assisted in the establishment of Remington Park horse racing track and casino.

== Keating Administration ==
In 1994, Republican Frank Keating, a former Reagan Administration official, was elected Governor of Oklahoma. Keating tapped Cook to serve as his Secretary of Tourism and Recreation. As Tourism Secretary, Cook oversaw all efforts to promote Oklahoma as a tourist destination. Concurrent with his service as Secretary, Cook also served as the Director of the Oklahoma Department of Tourism and Recreation.

Following Keating's reelection in 1998, Cook stepped down as Tourism Secretary to serve as the coordinator of fund-raising for the State's centennial in 2007. Keating appointed Jane Anne Jayroe, a former Miss America and Oklahoma City TV anchor, to succeed Cook as Secretary.

== Death ==
Cook died on March 3, 2021. He was 86.

Political offices
Preceded by	Oklahoma Secretary of Tourism and Recreation; Under Governor Frank Keating; 1995–1999	Succeeded by Jane Anne Jayroe
Preceded by	Director of the Oklahoma Department of Tourism and Recreation; Under Governor Frank Keating; 1995–1999	Succeeded by Jane Anne Jayroe
