= Pam Warren (civil servant) =

American civil servant

Pamela M. Warren

Oklahoma Deputy Secretary of Human Resources and Administration
- In office January 22, 2003 – December 31, 2004
- Governor: Brad Henry
- Preceded by: Position created
- Succeeded by: John S. Richard

Oklahoma Secretary of Administration
- In office January 1, 1997 – January 22, 2003
- Governor: Frank Keating
- Preceded by: Tom Brennan
- Succeeded by: Position abolished

Director of the Oklahoma Department of Central Services
- In office January 1, 1997 – December 31, 2004
- Governor: Frank Keating; Brad Henry
- Preceded by: Tom Brennan
- Succeeded by: John S. Richard

Personal details
- Education: Oklahoma State University; University of Oklahoma
- Occupation: Civil Servant

Pamela M. Warren is an American civil servant who served as the Oklahoma Secretary of Administration under Governor of Oklahoma Frank Keating. Warren served as secretary from January 1, 1997, until her retirement from state service in January 2004. In addition to her service as secretary, Warren served as the director of the Oklahoma Department of Central Services during that same time period.

== Career ==
Warren received a Bachelor of Science from Oklahoma State University and a Master of Regional and City Planning from the University of Oklahoma in 1974. While attending OU, Warren served as work-study intern for the United States Department of Housing and Urban Development in the Oklahoma Department of Economic and Community Affairs.

After graduating, Warren became the Planning Director for the Oklahoma Indian Affairs Commission and later became the program director for the Ozark Foothills Regional Planning Commission. From 1982 to 1985, she worked as an administrative assistant for women's issues for Governor of Oklahoma George Nigh. She was later promoted by Governor Nigh to serve as his Senior Executive Assistant from 1985 to 1987. In that position, Warren was responsible for coordination and development of state policy for all intergovernmental activities, economic development, exports, reverse investments, international trade, overseas trade missions and public/private partnerships.

Following the election of Henry Bellmon as governor in 1986, Warren joined the Oklahoma Employment Security Commission as its director of information and supervisor of the Employment Service Program. She remained in that position until 1994.

In 1994, Warren was appointed Assistant Secretary of State by Oklahoma Secretary of State Glo Henley. As assistant secretary, Warren was the chief administrative officer for the Office of the Secretary of State, responsible for all administrative, policy, business, budgetary, personnel and legislative operations within the office. When Frank Keating was elected governor, he appointed Tom Cole as his secretary of state. Cole kept Warren on as his assistant secretary.

== Cabinet secretary ==
=== Secretary (1997–2003) ===
On January 1, 1997, following the resignation of Tom Brennan, Oklahoma Governor Frank Keating appointed Warren to serve as his second Secretary of Administration. At the same time, Governor Keating appointed her to serve concurrently as his director of the Oklahoma Department of Central Services.

As secretary, she oversaw 30 boards and commissions that examine, license and regulate many professional occupations, including medical, architects, engineers, banking and horse racing. As director, Warren was directly responsible for central purchasing, management of state office building space, the State Motor Pool, the state's self-insurance program, contracts State construction projects, and other central support services.

=== Deputy Secretary (2003–2004) ===
When Governor Brad Henry was elected in 2004, the positions of Secretary of Administration and Secretary of Human Resources were abolished and combined into one single Secretary of Human Resources and Administration. Henry appointed Oscar B. Jackson Jr. to serve as the secretary and appointed Warren to serve as his deputy secretary. Henry continued to have Warren to serve as director of the Central Services Department.

Warren remained in those positions until 2004, when she retired from state service. Governor Henry appointed John S. Richard, a retired United States Army colonel, to succeed Warren in both positions.

== Personal life ==
Warren resides in Oklahoma City, Oklahoma.

Political offices
Preceded by Tom Brennan	Oklahoma Secretary of Administration; Under Governor Frank Keating; January 1, 1997 - January 22, 2003	Succeeded by Position abolished Oscar B. Jackson Jr. as Secretary of Human Resources and Administration
Preceded by Robert Ricks	Director of the Oklahoma Department of Central Services; Under Governors Frank Keating and Brad Henry; January 1, 1997 - December 31, 2004	Succeeded by John S. Richard
Preceded by Position created Herself as Secretary of Administration	Oklahoma Deputy Secretary of Human Resources and Administration; Under Governor Brad Henry; January 22, 2003 - December 31, 2004	Succeeded by John S. Richard
