= Jane Anne Jayroe =

American model and politician

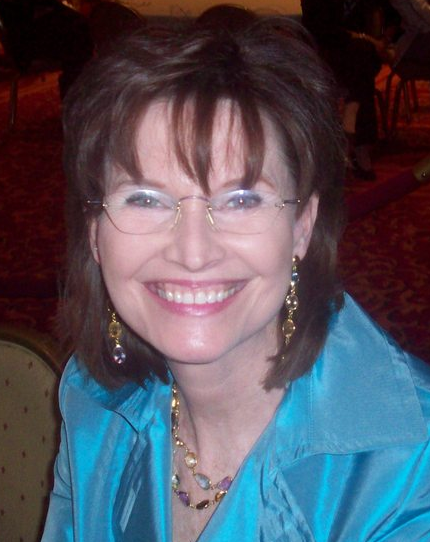
- Jane Jayroe signing autographs at a Miss America 2008 event.

Oklahoma Secretary of Tourism and Recreation
- In office 1999–2003
- Governor: Frank Keating
- Preceded by: Edward H. Cook
- Succeeded by: Post abolished Kathy Taylor as Secretary of Commerce and Tourism

Director of the Oklahoma Department of Tourism and Recreation
- In office 1999–2003
- Governor: Frank Keating
- Preceded by: Edward H. Cook

Personal details
- Born: October 30, 1946 (age 79) Clinton, Oklahoma
- Spouse: Gerald Gamble (m. 1994)
- Children: 1
- Education: Oklahoma City University
- Occupation: Beauty queen, journalist
- Website: Official Website

Jane Anne Jayroe-Gamble (born October 30, 1946) is an American broadcaster, author, public official and former beauty queen from Laverne, Oklahoma. In her youth, she was Miss Oklahoma in 1966 and Miss America in 1967. Jayroe worked as an anchor in TV news in Oklahoma City and Dallas-Fort Worth broadcast media markets for 16 years. Later, Governor of Oklahoma Frank Keating appointed her to serve as his Secretary of Tourism and Recreation in his Cabinet. She served in that position from 1999 until 2003. Jayroe has authored numerous articles and books and was spokesman for The Presbyterian Health Foundation.

== Early life and education ==
Jane Anne Jayroe was born on October 30, 1946, to Pete Jayroe and Helene Smith Jayroe in Clinton, Oklahoma. Jayroe grew up in Sentinel and Laverne, Oklahoma. She has one older sister, Judith Jayroe Wieser Elmore.

== Pageantry ==
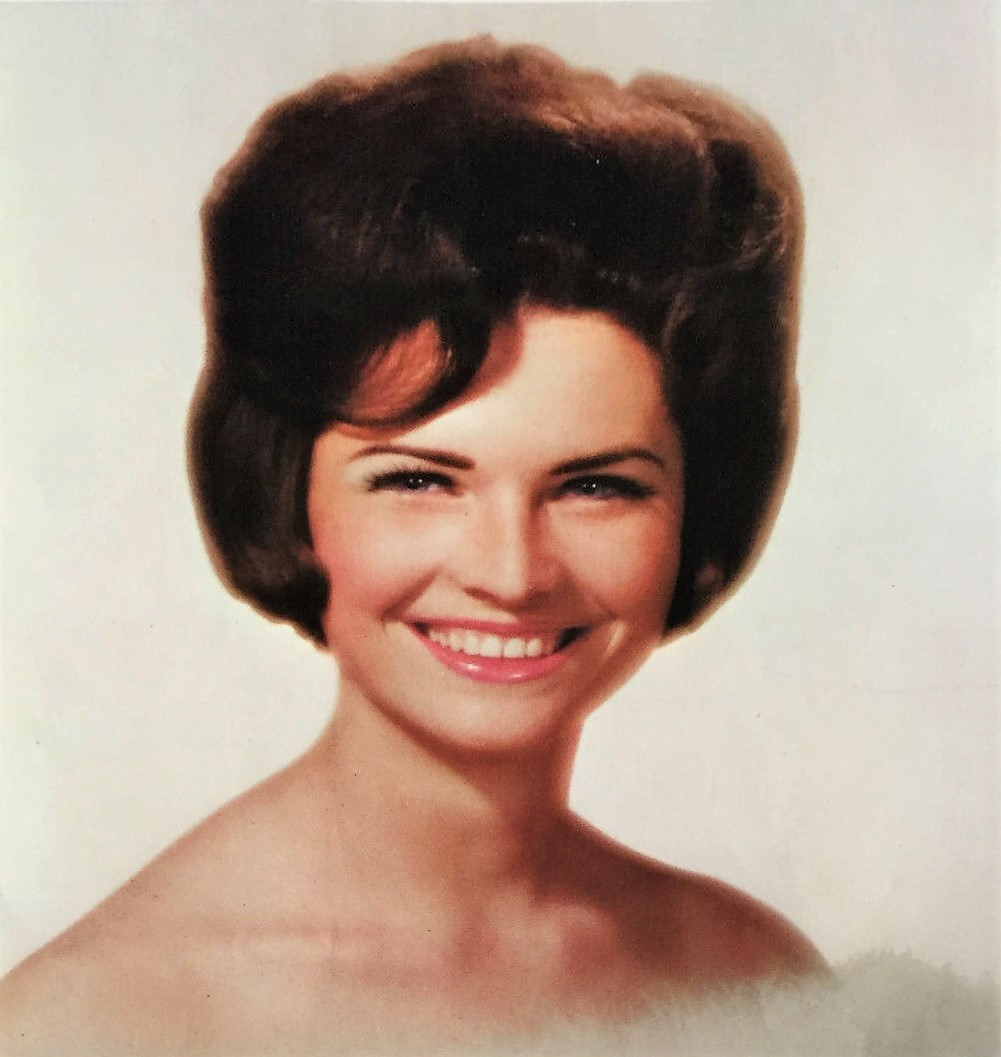
Jayroe as Miss America, 1966

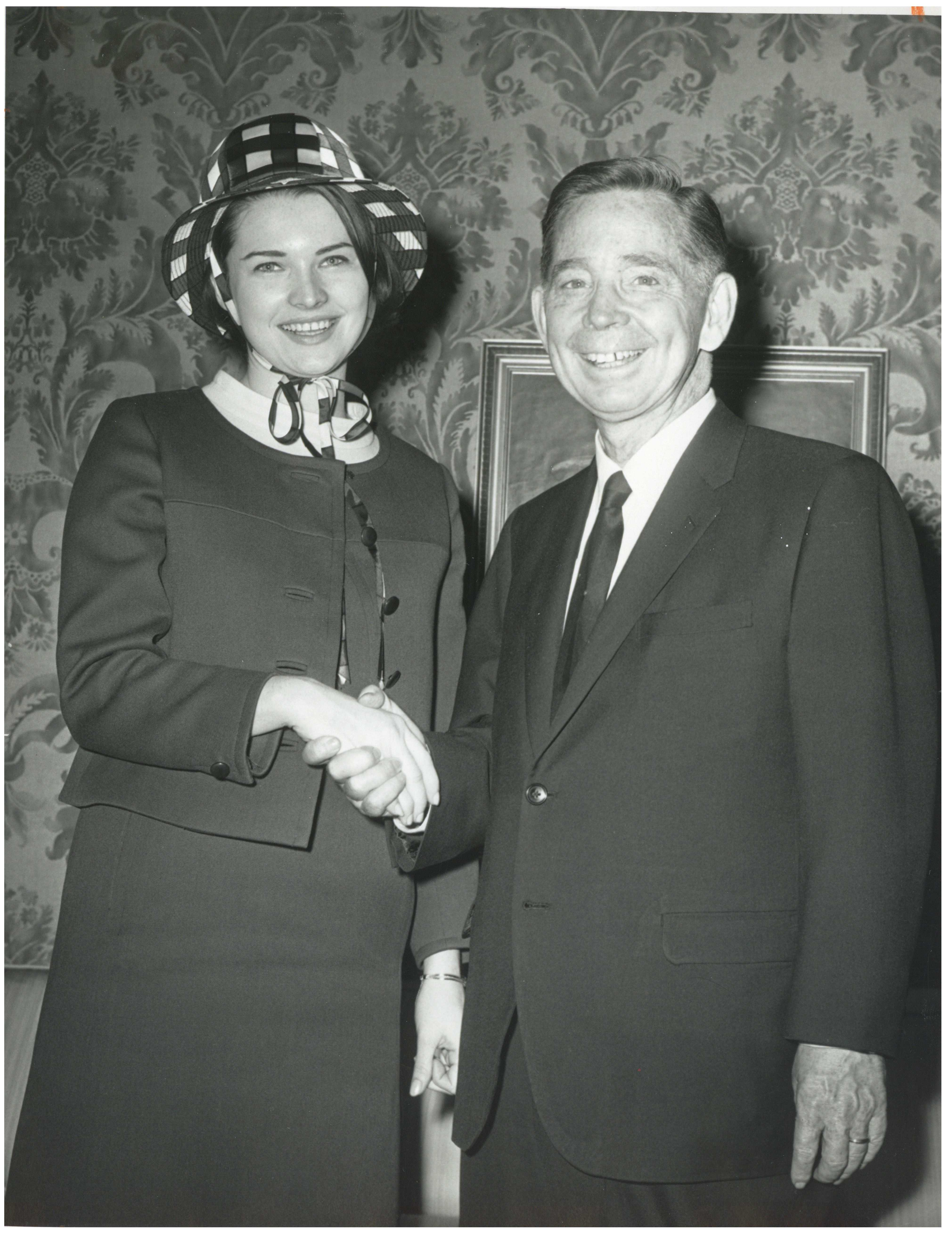
Jane Anne Jayroe with Carl Albert

As a student at Oklahoma City University, she entered the university’s pageant through her sorority, Alpha Chi Omega, and then went on to win the Miss Oklahoma Pageant. Then, at the age of 19, and with no previous pageant experience, Jane was crowned Miss America 1967. She sang with and conducted an orchestra for her talent. After being crowned Miss America 1967, she traveled around the world and traveled to Vietnam to entertain America’s troops abroad.

== Professional career ==
=== News industry ===
Jane became a recognized and respected primetime news anchor for KOCO and KTVY (now KFOR-TV) in Oklahoma City and KXAS in Dallas/Fort Worth. She won several awards during her 16-year career including the first female to be awarded “Outstanding News Personality” in the Dallas-Fort Worth television market. She also hosted a health-related public affairs show, "Health Matters" on Oklahoma's PBS network, OETA. Jayroe later went on to co-host the television show, Discover Oklahoma, promoting tourism within the state of Oklahoma.

=== Health advocacy ===
In 1992, Jayroe become the first spokesperson for the Oklahoma Health Center and Vice President of the Presbyterian Health Foundation.

=== Civic work ===
She was the first woman elected Chairman of the Oklahoma Academy for State Goals and is on executive committees for the University of Oklahoma Breast Health Institute, Oklahoma City University Board of Trustees and the Oklahoma Health Center Foundation. As a member of the United Methodist Church Church of the Servant in Oklahoma City, Jayroe is on the Women's Ministries Team and a board member for the Education and Employment Ministries. She has taken an active role in issues affecting young people, serving as honorary chair for the Conference on Teen Pregnancy, Youth Arts Month and the Oklahoma Parents and Teachers Association. She is a former trustee for the Sarkey's Foundation.

=== Government service ===
Governor of Oklahoma George Nigh appointed Jayroe to the Oklahoma Commission on the Status of Women. Governor David Walters appointed her to the Oklahoma Board on Legislative Compensation.

=== Other honors ===
Jayroe Gamble was inducted into the Oklahoma Hall of Fame in the state centennial year. A street in her childhood hometown of Laverne, Oklahoma, was renamed in her honor.

== Keating Administration ==
Following his reelection as governor, Frank Keating appointed Jayroe as his Secretary of Tourism and Recreation. In addition to her service as tourism secretary, Keating appointed Jayroe to serve as the Director of the Oklahoma Department of Tourism and Recreation.

She resigned from the position after serving four years on the board.

== Literary work ==
Jayroe is the author of several articles appearing in McCall's and other publications, such as Out of the Blue, Delight Comes Into Your Life and Chicken Soup for the Mother's Soul. She was producer for "Daily Devotionals," a set of audiocassettes by area ministers and laypeople, and recently created a seminar for women titled "Living Grace-fully." Her most current publications include More Grace Than Glamour: My Life as Miss America and Beyond, and Oklahoma 3, a book published for the Centennial year of Oklahoma’s statehood and portraying the diversity of the state.

== Personal life ==
She currently resides with her husband, Gerald Gamble, in Oklahoma City. She has one son, Tyler Jayroe (born 1976).

Awards and achievements
Preceded by Deborah Bryant	Miss America; 1967	Succeeded by Debra Dene Barnes
Preceded by Sandra Curtis	Miss Oklahoma; 1966	Succeeded by Sandy Ferguson

Political offices
Preceded by Edward H. Cook	Oklahoma Secretary of Tourism and Recreation; Under Governor Frank Keating; 1999 - 2003	Succeeded by Post abolished Kathy Taylor as Secretary of Commerce and Tourism
Preceded by Edward H. Cook	Director of the Oklahoma Department of Tourism and Recreation; Under Governor Frank Keating; 1999 - 2003	Succeeded by
