= Howard Barnett Jr. =

American businessman and politician

Howard G. Barnett Jr.

President of Oklahoma State University-Tulsa
- In office 2009–2013
- Preceded by: Gary Trennepohl

Chief of Staff to Governor Frank Keating
- In office 1999–2003
- Governor: Frank Keating
- Preceded by: Ken Lackey
- Succeeded by: Post abolished

Oklahoma Secretary of Commerce
- In office 1998–1999
- Governor: Frank Keating
- Preceded by: Ron Rosenfeld
- Succeeded by: Russell M. Perry

Director of the Oklahoma Department of Commerce
- In office 1998–1999
- Governor: Frank Keating
- Preceded by: Leo Presley
- Succeeded by: Ronald E. Bussert

Personal details
- Born: 1950 (age 75–76) Tulsa, Oklahoma
- Party: Republican
- Spouse: Barbara
- Occupation: Businessman, lawyer

Howard G. Barnett Jr. (born 1950 Kansas City) is an American businessman and politician from Oklahoma who is currently serving as the President of Oklahoma State University-Tulsa. Barnett previously served as the Oklahoma Secretary of Commerce under Governor of Oklahoma Frank Keating from 1998 to 1999. Keating appointed Barnett to serve concurrently as the Director of Oklahoma Department of Commerce.

== Early life and career ==
An infant boy, whose birth name is unknown, was adopted immediately after his birth in Kansas City, Missouri by Howard Gentry Barnett, Sr. and Florence Lloyd Jones Barnett, of Tulsa. Florence Lloyd Jones was the only daughter of Richard Lloyd Jones, the owner, editor, and publisher of the Tulsa Tribune, a major newspaper in Tulsa from 1919 until 1992.

After graduating from Edison High School in Tulsa, Barnett earned a bachelor's degree in business administration from the University of Tulsa in 1972 and a Juris Doctor from Southern Methodist University in 1975. After graduating from law school, Barnett served in private practice with interests in business, securities and tax law in Tulsa, Oklahoma. He then joined the Tulsa Tribune company, eventually rising to the position of president and CEO of that company until 1992. In 1993, Barnett accepted the position of Director of Business Development with Tulsa-based The Official Information Company. During his career in Tulsa, he served as chair of the Tulsa Chamber of Commerce.

== Keating Administration ==
=== Secretary of Commerce ===
Governor of Oklahoma Frank Keating appointed Barnett as his second Secretary of Commerce to replace outgoing Secretary Ron Rosenfeld. As secretary, Barnett had supervision over the Oklahoma Department of Commerce and the Oklahoma Department of Labor. In addition to his service as secretary, Keating appointed Barnett as director of the Commerce Department.

=== Chief of staff ===
Barnett continued to serve as secretary until 1999 when he resigned to become Governor Keating's chief of staff. Keating appointed Russell M. Perry to succeed Barnett. As chief of staff, Barnett served as Keating's chief advisor. In particular, he advised Keating on international trade promotion. Barnett continued to serve as Keating's chief of staff until the end of Keating's term as governor.

== Private sector ==
Following the end of Keating's term as governor, Barnett returned to Tulsa to become the managing director of merchant banking with TSF Capital LLC, where he specialized in mergers and acquisitions.

== Campaign for state treasurer ==
In 2006, Barnett announced he would seek the Republican nomination to challenge incumbent Democratic Oklahoma State Treasurer Scott Meacham. He secured the Republican nomination after defeating Daniel Keating, Frank Keating's brother. On election day in 2006, Meacham defeated Barnett with 60% of the vote.

== Oklahoma State University ==
In 2009, Barnett worked as chief negotiator for the OSU Medical Center Trust as it was acquiring what would become the OSU Medical Center from the previous owner, Ardent Health Systems.

On October 5, 2009, the Board of Regents for Oklahoma State University (OSU) named Barnett president of OSU-Tulsa, succeeding Gary Trennepohl. In March 2010, the Board of Regents expanded his job scope to include being president of the OSU Center for Health Sciences (OSU-CHS), thus consolidating responsibility for leading all of OSU's activities located in Tulsa.

Barnett resigned as president of OSU-CHS in September 2013 to accept the position of chief executive officer of the OSU Medical Authority and OSU Medical Trust, which own OSU Medical Center. He then negotiated an arrangement for Mercy to become the managing partner of the Medical Center. He then returned to his former position at OSU-Tulsa.

== Civic and philanthropic activities ==
Both Howard and Billie, individually and through their family foundation, are heavily involved in civic and philanthropic activities, including: the Tulsa Ballet, the Salvation Army, The Oklahoma Academy, the Oklahoma Center for Nonprofits, Philbrook Museum of Art, the Arts and Humanities Council of Tulsa, Youth Services of Tulsa and the National Council of Nonprofits.

== Notes ==
Political offices
Preceded by Ron Rosenfeld	Oklahoma Secretary of Commerce; Under Governor Frank Keating; 1998–1999	Succeeded by Russell M. Perry
Preceded by Leo Presley	Director of the Oklahoma Department of Commerce; Under Governor Frank Keating; 1998–1999	Succeeded by Ronald E. Bussert
Preceded by Ken Lackey	Chief of Staff to Governor Frank Keating; August 1, 1999 – January 13, 2003	Post abolished
Party political offices
Preceded by Bob Keasler	Republican nominee for Oklahoma State Treasurer; 2006	Succeeded by Ken A. Miller
Academic offices
Preceded by Dr. Gary Trennepohl	President of Oklahoma State University-Tulsa; September 2009–present	Incumbent
