= Laura Boyd =

American politician (born 1949)

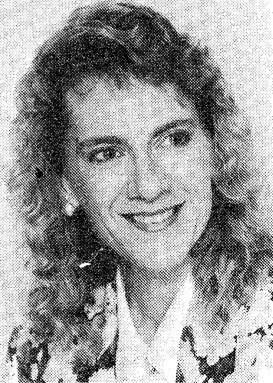

Member of the Oklahoma House of Representatives from the 44th district
- In office January 1993 – January 1999
- Preceded by: Carolyn Thompson Taylor
- Succeeded by: Bill Nations

Personal details
- Born: June 5, 1949 (age 77) Charlottesville, Virginia, U.S.
- Party: Democratic
- Spouse: David Rambo
- Education: Duke University (BA); Marywood University (MA); William Lyon University (PhD)

Laura Boyd (born June 5, 1949) is an American politician from Oklahoma. A member of the Democratic Party, Boyd was elected in 1992 to the Oklahoma House of Representatives to represent District 44, which included Cleveland County. She served in the State House for six years until 1998 when she became the first woman to receive a major party nomination for Governor of Oklahoma. Incumbent Republican governor Frank Keating defeated Boyd in a landslide. Eisenhower Fellowships selected Laura Boyd as a USA Eisenhower Fellow in 1999.

== Biography ==
Boyd was born in Charlottesville, Virginia. She earned a bachelor's degree from Duke University, a master's from Marywood University, and a PhD in Psychology from American Commonwealth University. Boyd served in the Oklahoma House of Representatives from 1993 to 1998 and chaired the Community and Family Responsibilities Committee. She introduced 11 bills while in the House, three of which were signed into law. Boyd sponsored legislation to help create jobs in Oklahoma, to crack down on elder abuse, and to establish the College Savings Plan.

In 1998 Boyd became the first woman to be nominated for Governor of Oklahoma when she won the nomination of the Oklahoma Democratic Party. She received 41% of the votes and was defeated by Republican Frank Keating. In 2002 Boyd was the Democratic nominee for Lieutenant Governor of Oklahoma but was defeated by Republican Mary Fallin.

Boyd has taught at both the undergraduate and graduate levels. She has offered private counseling for over 20 years.

She is owner and CEO of Policy and Performance Consultants Inc. in Norman, as well as national field director of Women Legislators' Lobby and executive director of the Oklahoma Therapeutic Foster Care Association.

In 2011 she was inducted into the Oklahoma Women's Hall of Fame.

== Major legislation ==
The Ryan Luke Act, which cracks down on child abuse and sexual predators, was Boyd's major legislative contribution.

Party political offices
Preceded by Jack Mildren	Democratic nominee for Governor of Oklahoma; 1998	Succeeded by Brad Henry
Preceded by Jack Morgan	Democratic nominee for Lieutenant Governor of Oklahoma; 2002	Succeeded by Jari Askins
