= Nigh Commission =

The Commission on the Reform of Oklahoma State Government, also known as the Nigh Commission, was a committee that in 1984 recommended sweeping changes to the government of the State of Oklahoma to improve efficiency, economy and service. It is named after former Governor of Oklahoma George Nigh, who appointed the Commission.

Under the leadership of Chairman Walter Allison of Bartlesville, Oklahoma, the Commission issued its final report and recommendations to Governor Nigh on November 1, 1984.

== Background ==
Governor Nigh, on February 1, 1984, issued Executive Order 84-1, which established the Commission. The Commission was composed of one hundred members, all volunteers, representing twenty separate business and professional fields from all areas of the State. Governor Nigh pledged the full support of the executive branch to the Commission, with the Oklahoma Legislature later passing resolutions also supporting the work of the Commission.

The Commission began operations on February 9, 1984. The Commission was neither funded or supported by the State government: it generated its own funds, provided its own office space and administrative support. No active member of the executive, legislative, or judicial branches was allowed to serve on the Commission in order to ensure an honest inspection of the State government.

The Commission divided itself into nine Study Committees:

- Administrative Services, Personnel Management and Purchasing Committee
- Agriculture, Business and Economic Development Committee
- Education Committee
- Government Structure Committee
- Health and Human Services Committee
- Natural, Cultural and Historical Resources Committee
- Public Safety, Defense and Law Enforcement Committee
- Revenue, Taxation and Financial Management Committee
- Transportation Committee

Each of the Study Committees was assigned responsibility for reviewing a list of State agencies with related functions.

The Study Committees meet numerous times between February and September, 1984. During their meetings, agency personnel, elected officials, representatives of various groups and organizations and other individuals met with the Study Committees. Each Committee submitted its own report to the full Commission, which then meet in October to review and accept or reject each recommendation.

The Commission submitted its final report to Governor Nigh on November 1, 1984, at such times it ceased operations.

== Recommendations ==
The Commission recommended several hundred recommendations to improve the operations of State government. Several of these recommendations have since been implemented, but several others (as of 2010) have not.

=== Governmental structure ===
The Governmental Structure Study Committee recommended a major reorganization of the agencies, board, commission and departments into a Cabinet-type government for the executive branch. The Cabinet should consist of the following agencies:

- Department of Administrative Services
- Department of Commerce and Agriculture
- Department of Education
- Department of Health and Human Services
- Department of Natural, Cultural and Recreational Resources
- Department of Public Safety and Law Enforcement
- Department of Transportation

The Committee recommended that the Legislature reduce its administrative and staff organizations by establishing a single joint administrative office. The judicial branch, as recommended by the Committee, should be more efficiently handle its caseload with existing staff. Additionally, district court boundaries should be improved and provide for greater flexibility in assigning judges.

The Committee noted that the basic structure of county government in the State has remained unchanged since statehood in 1907. The Committee recommended that county government be provided with greater efficiency and flexibility for management.

=== Finances ===
The Revenue, Taxation and Financial Management Study Committee did develop specific recommendations for greater efficiency. However, no specific recommendations were made involving a "flat tax" on income, a tax on non-producing minerals, and measure to assure the collect of personal property taxes.

=== Public health ===
The Health and Human Services Study Committee recognized that there were many health and human services programs, with many of these programs being the result of New Deal programs.

The Committee found that the management of these programs involves the same complexities of a large business enterprise and recommended major improvements in the structure and management of those programs.

=== Administrative services ===
The Administrative Services, Personnel Management and Purchasing Study Committee reviewed its assigned agencies and found most of them to operate efficiently and effectively. The Committee recommended several changes that would improve efficiency and result in tax savings. Some of these recommendations involved establishing a unified control where none currently exist. Other recommendations involved removing unjust and unfair favoritism in personnel procedures and benefits.

=== Economic development ===
The Agriculture, Business and Economic Development Study Committee focused on recommendations to improve the environment for productive economic enterprises. The Committee made recommendations to abolish or alleviate state policies which discourage business investment and recommended policies to stimulate growth.

=== Public safety ===
The Public Safety, Defense and Law Enforcement Study Committee reviewed thirteen boards, bureaus, and departments. Several items were discovered:

- On the whole, each agency appeared to function smoothly and appropriately performed their duties
- All individuals who appeared before the Committee were knowledgeable about their respective agency
- Tremendous opportunity exists for agency consolidation and sharing of support services
- Most agency representatives stressed the unique aspects of their agencies and denied the existence of overlap and redundancy
- Most agencies strongly resisted any suggestion that services might improve or savings might result from consolidation or sharing of support services
- Few agencies had developed long-range plans

The Committee found that most agencies operated without regard for how it might operate more efficiently or effectively. Additionally, most agencies showed a narrowness and "empire building" mentality in their management structure.

The Committee recommended that most, if not all, of the State's public safety and law enforcement agencies be consolidated into one to three "super-agencies" reporting to a single Cabinet-level position under the Governor. During, and until, such consolidation, the Committee made various recommendations on internal agency improvements.

=== Education ===
The Education Study Committee divided itself into three Subcommittees:

- Elementary and Secondary Schools
- Vocational-Technical Education
- Higher Education

The Committee, as a whole, recommended greater accountability for all educational levels. In particular, greater financial accountability and greater accountability from educational professionals. A general recommendation for greater coordination among education activities was made by the Committee, particularly be establishing a single Department of Education under a Cabinet Secretary answerable directly to the Governor. Area specific recommendations being made for each educational-level activity.

=== Natural Resources ===
The Natural, Cultural and Historical Resources Study Committee identified four general problems for the agencies it reviewed:

- Lack of communication among agency heads
- Problems with direct lines of communications with the Governor and Legislature
- Redundancy in programs
- Problems with personnel under the Merit System

The Committee found that intra-agency efficiency, staffing and funding needs for the examined agencies was difficult under the current organizational structure. Each agency depended on its appointed board members to communicate with the Governor and Legislature.

The Committee recommended that a Department of Natural, Cultural and Recreational Resources be established and assume the functions currently performed by existing agencies. The new Department would be headed by a Cabinet Secretary answerable directly to the Governor. The new Department would reduce costs, provide for better coordination and ensure better control by the Governor.

In new Department, the Committee recommended the retention of citizen boards currently in use. These boards would continue to serve in an advisory capacity to the Department. The Cabinet Secretary would serve as a voting member of each board related to the new Department.

=== Transportation ===
The Transportation Study Committee commented on the growing need for more funding to transportation activities in the State.

The Committee gave praise to the efforts of former Governor David L. Boren to consolidate the State's transportation activities into a single entity in the Oklahoma Department of Transportation. Previously, transportation was handled by the Railroad Maintenance Authority, the Highway Safety Coordinating Committee, the Aeronautics Commission and the Highway Department. Under Board, these agencies were consolidated into the Department of Transportation. The Commission recommended further consolidation by merging the Oklahoma Turnpike Authority into the Transportation Department.

Though concerns were initially voiced over the purchasing process used for transportation construction materials, the Committee ultimately found that the current process of centralized purchasing achieved favorable results and did not make any recommendation to reform it.

== See also ==
- Executive Branch Reform Act of 1986
