= Oklahoma Merit Protection Commission =

- Great Seal of Oklahoma

Agency overview
- Formed: July 1, 1982
- Preceding agency: Oklahoma Merit System Office
- Dissolved: December 31, 2022
- Headquarters: 3545 NW 58 Street, Suite 360; Oklahoma City, Oklahoma
- Employees: 1 classified 2 unclassified
- Annual budget: $400,000
- Ministers responsible: Cabinet Secretary, Oscar B. Jackson Jr.
- Agency executive: Carol Shelley, Executive Director
- Website: www.mpc.ok.gov

The Oklahoma Merit Protection Commission (OMPC) was an independent quasi-judicial agency of the government of Oklahoma established to protect the integrity of state’s merit system utilized by state agencies and their employees. The Commission and the Office of Personnel Management acted independently forming a “checks and balances” method of managing the merit system.

The Commission was composed of nine members, two appointed by the President pro tempore of the Oklahoma Senate, two by the Speaker of the Oklahoma House of Representatives, and five by the Governor of Oklahoma. The Commission, in turn, appointed an Executive Director and administrative law judges to hear disputes.

The Commission was created in 1982 by the Oklahoma Personnel Act during the term of Governor George Nigh. It was absorbed into the Civil Service Division of the Office of Management and Enterprise Services in 2022 after the Oklahoma Legislature passed the Civil Service and Human Capital Modernization Act.

== Functions ==
The Commission's functions were established by O.S. 74 840-1.9, which was repealed in 2022, and are listed below in part:

- Receive and act on complaints, counsel persons and groups on their rights and duties and take action designed to obtain voluntary compliance with the provisions of the Oklahoma Personnel Act
- Investigate allegations of violations of the provisions of the Oklahoma Personnel Act within its jurisdiction
- Investigate allegations of abuses in the employment practices of the Administrator of the Oklahoma Office of Personnel Management or of any other state agency
- Investigate allegations of violations of the rules of the Merit System of Personnel Administration and prohibited activities in the classified service
- Establish and maintain a statewide Alternative Dispute Resolution Program to provide dispute resolution services for state agencies and employees. Actions agreed upon through the Alternative Dispute Resolution Program provided by the Commission shall be consistent with applicable laws and rules and shall not alter, reduce, or modify any existing right or authority as provided by statute or rule
- Establish rules, pursuant to the Administrative Procedures Act as may be necessary to perform the duties and functions of the Commission including, but not limited to, rules to monitor state agency grievance processes to ensure full compliance with the law. The Commission may also recommend any changes it deems necessary to improve such grievance processes to the appropriate state agency
- Establish guidelines for the qualifications, duties, responsibilities, authority, power, and continued employment of the Executive Director, Administrative Hearing Officers, mediators, and other resolution arbitrators or facilitators

In addition to its original functions, this agency was responsible for providing training on the grievance process, the appeals process, the steps of the Progressive Discipline in state employment and training for its administrative law judges. Agency functions also included a component designed to assist agencies in voluntarily complying with the Oklahoma Personnel Act.

=== Classified and unclassified ===
The Commission had jurisdiction over state employees that were in the classified service and limited jurisdiction over state employees in the unclassified service. That meant all state employees and positions which are subject to the laws of the Oklahoma State Personnel Act and the decisions of the Commission. The two primary distinctions between classified and unclassified employees were as follows:

- Unclassified employees serve at the pleasure of the Appointing Authority. They may be removed from their position at any time, with or without cause, and have no right to appeal their termination to the Commission.
- Unclassified employees are non-competitive positions. They are appointed by the Appointing Authority without regard to merit provisions, such as a public publishing of the open position and/or ratings of eligible candidates.

== Leadership ==
=== Members of the Commission ===
The Commission was composed of nine members, each serving three year terms. Two members of the Commission were appointed by the President pro tempore of the Oklahoma Senate, two were appointed by the Speaker of the Oklahoma House of Representatives, and five members were appointed by the Governor of Oklahoma. Of the Governor's appointees, no more than four could be from the same political party.
