= Tom Brennan (civil servant) =

American politician (1928–2013)

Tom Brennan (June 4, 1928 – January 25, 2013) was an Oklahoma Secretary of Administration and Director of Purchasing in the Cabinet of Governor Frank Keating. Prior to this, he had worked as an engineer for General Electric, Vice President of Engineering for Warner Electric Brake and Clutch, and as President and CEO for Oil Dynamics, Inc.

Political offices
Preceded by -	Oklahoma Secretary of Administration; Under Governor Frank Keating; 1995-1997	Succeeded by Pam Warren
