= Monte Cassino School (Tulsa, Oklahoma) =

Coordinates: 36.132468°N 95.959743°W

Monte Cassino School is an independent, Benedictine Catholic elementary and middle school located in midtown Tulsa, Oklahoma. The school also included a girls' junior college until 1945 and a high school until 1986.

== History ==
It was founded in 1926 by the Benedictine Sisters as a girls' school and junior college. In the early 1960s, Monte Cassino terminated its boarding school, and its residence hall became the new home for the sisters of the St. Joseph Monastery.

When the high school closed a preschool opened and the educational institute adopted co-education for its middle school. At the same time, the neighboring Catholic boys' school, Cascia Hall Preparatory School, began admitting girls in middle school and high school, effectively absorbing Monte Cassino's role as a girls' high school. (The two schools had shared some classes in previous years.)

== Notable alumni ==
- Former Oklahoma Governor Frank Keating attended Monte Cassino and graduated from the middle school in 1958.
- Actress Jennifer Jones attended Monte Cassino and graduated from the junior college in 1936 before continuing her education at Northwestern University.
- Actress, model, and former Miss USA titleholder Olivia Jordan attended Monte Cassino and graduated from the middle school in 2003.
- Psychotherapist, researcher, and developer of Dialectical Behavioral Therapy (DBT) Marsha Linehan attended Monte Cassino.

== Cultural references ==
The school provides a frequent location for the House of Night book series by P.C. and Kristin Cast.
