= James Hager =

American politician

Member of the Oklahoma House of Representatives from the 36th district
- In office 1989–1999
- Preceded by: Don Anderson
- Succeeded by: Joe Sweeden

Personal details
- Party: Democratic Party

James Hager is an American politician who served in the Oklahoma House of Representatives representing the 36th district from 1989 to 1999. A member of the Democratic Party, he unsuccessfully ran in the 1998 Oklahoma gubernatorial election.
