= Hubert H. Bryant =

American attorney (1931–2016)

United States Attorney for the Northern District of Oklahoma
- In office 1977–1981
- President: Jimmy Carter
- Preceded by: Nathan G. Graham
- Succeeded by: Frank Keating

Personal details
- Born: January 4, 1931
- Died: December 25, 2016 (aged 85) Tulsa, Oklahoma
- Party: Democratic

Hubert H. Bryant (January 4, 1931 – December 25, 2016) was an American attorney who served as the United States Attorney for the Northern District of Oklahoma from 1977 to 1981.

He died on December 25, 2016, in Tulsa, Oklahoma at age 85.
