= Keating v. Edmondson =

- Court: Supreme Court of Oklahoma
- Full case name: Frank Keating, Governor of the State of Oklahoma, Plaintiff v. Drew Edmondson, Attorney General of the State of Oklahoma, Defendant
- Decided: December 4 2001
- Citation: 2001 OK 110, 37 P.3d 882

Case history
- Prior history: Plaintiff appealed from the decision of the District Court of Oklahoma County
- Subsequent history: District Court ruling upheld, oral argument denied

Holding
- The Governor, after establishing his executive cabinet, may not alter the cabinet without the consent of the Legislature

Court membership
- Judges sitting: Chief Justice Rudolph Hargrave; Vice Chief Justice Joseph M. Watt; Associate Justices Ralph B. Hodges, Robert E. Lavender, Marian Opala, Yvonne Kauger, Hardy Summers, Daniel J. Boudreau, James R. Winchester

Case opinions
- Majority: Hargrave, joined by Watt, Hodges, Lavender, Opala, Kauger, Summers, Boudreau
- Concurrence: Winchester

Laws applied
- Okla. Const. arts. V, VI; Executive Branch Reform Act of 1986
- Superseded by
- Executive Branch Reform Act Amendments of 2012

Keating v. Edmondson, 2001 OK 110, 37 P.3d 882 (2001), was an Oklahoma Supreme Court case that ruled that the Governor of Oklahoma could not alter the structure of his Cabinet without the approval of the Legislature. The case was primarily concerned with the Governor–Legislature relation. The case is unique because the two parties in the case were both state-wide elected officials:

- Frank Keating, the Governor of Oklahoma, was the plaintiff
- Drew Edmondson, the Attorney General of Oklahoma, was the defendant

== Background ==
In 1986, the Oklahoma Legislature passed the Executive Branch Reform Act of 1986. The Act allows each Governor of Oklahoma, within 45 days of assuming office, to organize the various State agencies, boards, and commissions into between 10 and 15 Cabinet Departments, with each headed by a Cabinet Secretary. The Governor is allowed to create whatever Cabinet Department he desires and may assign such State agencies to that Cabinet Department as he sees fit. The State agencies assigned to a cabinet department must have "similar programmatic or administrative objectives" but that definition is left to the Governor for determination. Once established, the Governor's Cabinet remains in effect until the Legislature supersedes the governor's organization.

In early May 2000, Governor Frank Keating appointed Russell Perry as acting Secretary of Commerce and sent his nomination as full Secretary to the Oklahoma Senate for approval. However, his nomination was deemed rejected when the Oklahoma Legislature adjourned without consideration his nomination. In response, on May 26, 2000, Governor Keating issued Executive Order No. 2000-11, which abolished the Cabinet Department of Commerce and creating the Cabinet Department of Economic Development and Special Affairs. On the same day, the Governor appointed Russell Perry to serve as the newly created position of Secretary of Economic Development and Special Affairs.

On June 8, 2000, State Senator Angela Monson submitted a request for an official opinion to Attorney General Drew Edmondson concerning the Governor's authority to make changes in his cabinet. Pursuant to statutorily imposed duties, the Attorney General issued an official opinion (Attorney General Opinion 2000 OK AG 54) on October 26, 2000, providing:

... 1. The governor may not modify the executive Cabinet after the forty-five-day period established at the beginning of his or her term for the creation of the Cabinet. See [sic] 74 O.S. 1991, [sic] §10.3. The power to modify the Cabinet after this time rests with the Legislature. ... ... 8. When the Governor attempts to create a Cabinet post outside the legislative process more than forty-five days after the Governor's term begins, the post does not exist; therefore, anyone the Governor attempts to appoint to that post is not a Cabinet secretary. Instead, the person the Governor attempted to appoint would be an employee of the Governor's office if the Governor and the person he tried to appoint had an agreement that the failed appointee would work for pay. ...

Recognizing his duty to follow the Attorney General's opinion until overturned by a court of competent jurisdiction, Governor Keating filed a petition on October 27, 2000, in the District Court of Oklahoma County. The Governor's petition wanted a declaration of relief and stay of effectiveness of the opinion and challenged the cited portions of the opinion. After hearing oral argument and considering the briefs of the parties and of the amicus curiae, such as Stratton Taylor, the President pro tempore of the Oklahoma Senate, the trial judge found the Attorney General's opinion to be a correct statement of the law set forth in the Executive Branch Reform Act of 1986.

On December 5, 2000, judgment was entered in the Attorney General's favor and a stay pending appeal was granted. On December 29, 2000, the Governor appealed a single issue - whether a Governor is empowered to reorganize the executive Cabinet throughout the term of office. The appeal was sent to the Oklahoma Supreme Court for consideration.

== Case ==
The Governor asserted that the Executive Branch Reform Act should be interpreted to permit gubernatorial reorganization of his Cabinet throughout a term of office as changing times and circumstances warrant. He argued that the forty-five-day time limitation contained in the statute is merely the period within which the initial Cabinet must be formed. The Attorney General contended that the plain language of the law:

- requires the creation of an executive Cabinet within forty-five days of the Governor's taking office
- the Cabinet so created cannot be altered absent legislative intervention

While acknowledging the legislative authority to alter the executive Cabinet, the Governor argued that the Executive Branch Reform Act contains no express limitation on his reorganization authority. He asserted that the statute was ambiguous in that it does not expressly prevent the governor from altering or amending his cabinet after it is initially established. The Governor contended that the cabinet, however designed or altered during the chief executive's term, will be in effect under the statute unless expressly superseded by the Legislature.

== Decision ==
The Supreme Court decided the case on December 4, 2001. In a unanimous decision, the Court rejected the Governor's appeal. Chief Justice Hargrave authored the majority opinion and was joined by Justices Watt, Hodges, Lavender, Opala, Kauger, Summers, and Boudreau. Justice Winchester wrote a concurring opinion to the majority. Noting that the legislative intent was clear and not ambiguous, the Court rejected the Governor's position and found that state law provided the Governor no power to alter the Cabinet at will.

The Court held that by virtue of office as the chief executive of the state, the Governor did not possess any inherent power to reorganize the Cabinet as circumstances require. The Legislature, it continued, was the only branch that held the reorganization power. Had the Legislature intended to allow gubernatorial authority to alter the cabinet, it could have provided it in the law. The Court found that:

... [i]n order to adopt the Governor's position - that 74 O.S. 1991 §10.3(A) should be construed to permit gubernatorial reorganization throughout a term of office as changing times and circumstances warrant, we would have to read an exception into the statutory provisions which simply does not exist.

— Keating v. Edmondson

In its majority opinion, the Court did mention that the Legislature was free to amend the Executive Branch Reform Act of 1986 to include the flexibility Governor Keating desired.

== See also ==
- Frank Keating
- Drew Edmondson
- Oklahoma Supreme Court
- Executive Branch Reform Act of 1986
