= Oklahoma Office of Juvenile Affairs =

Oklahoma state agency

- Office of Juvenile Affairs logo

Agency overview
- Formed: July 1, 1995
- Headquarters: 3812 N. Santa Fe Ave. Oklahoma City, Oklahoma, US
- Employees: 1,056 (FY11)
- Annual budget: $127 million (FY11)
- Agency executive: Rachel Holt, Executive Director
- Website: Oklahoma Office of Juvenile Affairs

The Oklahoma Office of Juvenile Affairs (OJA) is an agency of the US state of Oklahoma headquartered in Oklahoma City that is responsible for planning and coordinating statewide juvenile justice and delinquency prevention services. OJA is also responsible for operating juvenile correctional facilities in the State.

The Board of Juvenile Affairs is the governing body of OJA. The Board consists of seven members appointed by the Governor of Oklahoma and legislative leaders, by and with the advice and consent of the Oklahoma Senate. The current Executive Director is Rachel Holt. The Executive Director is appointed by the Governor and is subject to Senate confirmation.

The Office of Juvenile Affairs was created on July 1, 1995, during the term of Governor Frank Keating.

== History ==
The Office of Juvenile Affairs was legislatively created during the 1994 session when the Oklahoma Legislature passed the Juvenile Reform Act. Prior to this time, services for Oklahoma's in-need-of-supervision and delinquent youth were provided by the Oklahoma Department of Human Services.

== Leadership ==
The Office of Juvenile Affairs is under the supervision of the Secretary of Human Services. Under current Governor of Oklahoma Kevin Stitt, Dr. Deborah Shropshire serves as Secretary.

=== Board of Juvenile Affairs ===
The Board of Juvenile Affairs is the governing body of the Office of Juvenile Affairs. The Board consists of seven members appointed by the Governor of Oklahoma and legislative leaders, by and with the advice and consent of the Oklahoma Senate. The term of office for each board member is six years. Appointments are limited to two terms.

The Board of Juvenile Affairs sets broad policy for the OJA and is the rule making body for the OJA. The Board is responsible for reviewing and approving the budget, assisting the agency in planning activities related to the priorities and policies of the agency, providing a public forum for receiving comments and disseminating information to the public, and establishing contracting procedures for the agency and guidelines for rates of payment for services provided by contract.

As of January 2014, the members of the Board are as follows:

- Dr. Donnie L. Nero, Chairperson
- Janice E. Smith, Co-Chairperson
- Deanna Hartley-Kelso
- Richard Rice
- Scott Williams
- Mark Hinson
- Dr. Stephen Grissom

== Organization ==
- Board of Juvenile Affairs
  - Executive Director
    - General Counsel
    - Public Integrity
    - Government Relations
    - Chief of Staff
      - Chief Psychologist
      - Parol Administrator
      - Communications
      - Advocate General
      - Financial Services Division
      - Support Services Division
      - Institutional Services Division
        - Central Oklahoma Juvenile Center (COJC)
        - Southwest Oklahoma Juvenile Center (SWOJC)
      - Juvenile Services Division
        - District Offices 1 - 8
      - Community Based Youth Services Division

== Staffing ==
The Rehabilitation Services Department, with an annual budget of well over $100 million, is one of the largest employers of the State. For fiscal year 2010, the department was authorized 1,057 full-time employees.

Activity	Number of Employees
Administration Financial Services Support Services Legal Services Advocacy Services	87
Residential Services Institutional Services	624
Non Residential Services Juvenile Services Division Residential and Treatment Programs Division Community Based Youth Services Division	346
Total	1,057

== Facilities ==
The Central Oklahoma Juvenile Center (COCJ), located in Tecumseh, holds both boys and girls. is located on a 147.7-acre (59.8 ha) plat of land and occupies 30-acre (12 ha) of it. The school opened in 1917 and was under the Oklahoma Office of Juvenile Affairs since 1995; previously it was in the Oklahoma Department of Human Services. It previously served as an orphanage and mental health center in addition to being a juvenile correctional facility. Known by its current name since 1992, it was previously known as Girls Town, the Oklahoma State Industrial School for Incorrigible Girls, the State Industrial School for White Girls, Russell Industrial School, and Central Oklahoma Juvenile Treatment Center.

== See also ==
- Office of Juvenile Justice and Delinquency Prevention
- Oklahoma Department of Public Safety
- Attorney General of Oklahoma
- Oklahoma Department of Corrections
