= Ron Rosenfeld =

American politician and housing expert

Ronald Allan Rosenfeld
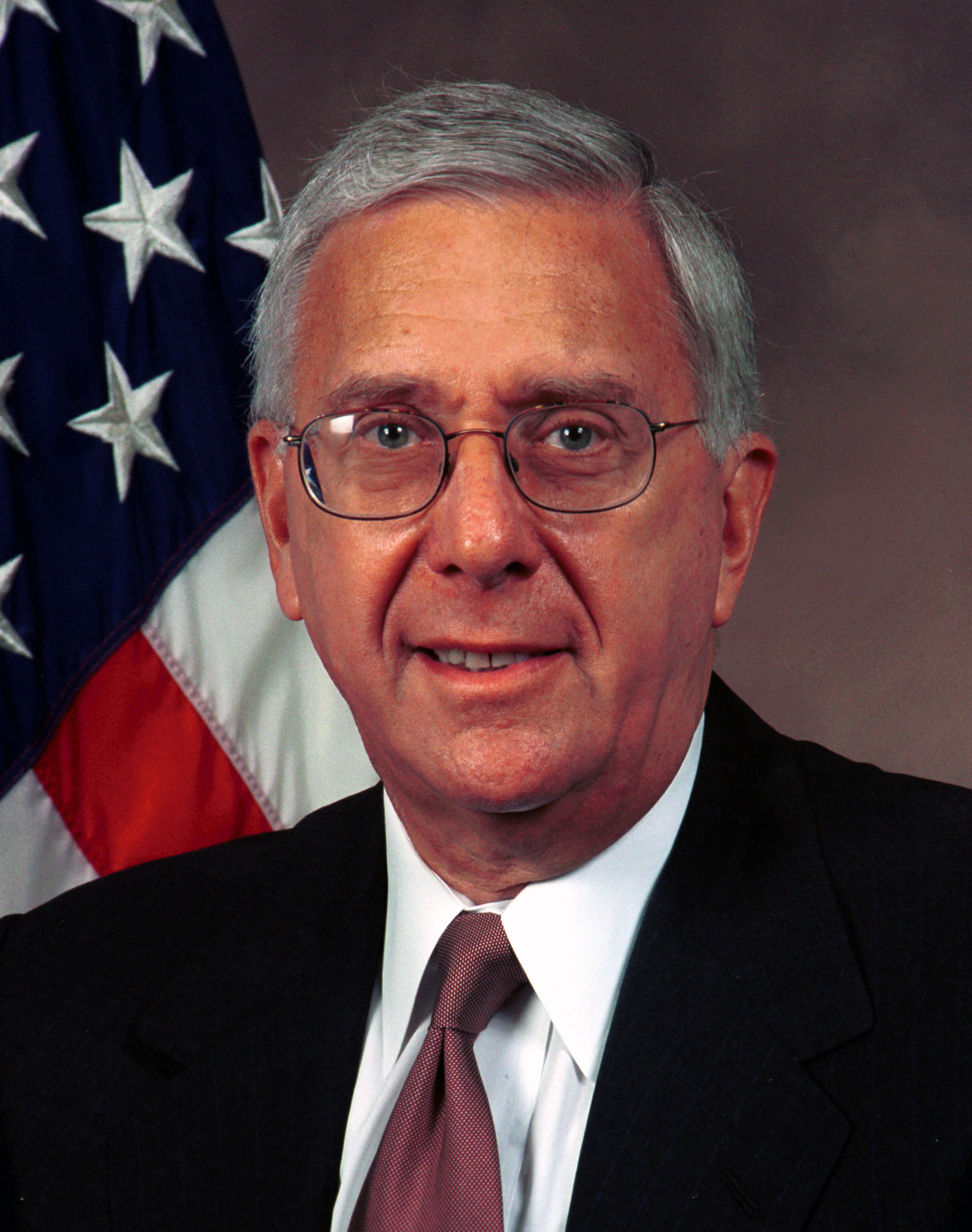

Chairman of the Federal Housing Finance Board
- In office December 14, 2005 – December 31, 2008
- President: George W. Bush
- Preceded by: Alicia R. Castaneda

President of the Government National Mortgage Association
- In office July 2001 – December 14, 2009
- President: George W. Bush
- Succeeded by: Robert M. Couch

Oklahoma Secretary of Commerce
- In office 1997–1998
- Governor: Frank Keating
- Preceded by: Dean Werries
- Succeeded by: Howard Barnett Jr.

Personal details
- Born: 1939 (age 86–87)
- Education: University of Pennsylvania (BA); Harvard University (JD)

Ronald Allan Rosenfeld (born 1939) is an American politician and housing expert. Rosenfeld has previously served in numerous U.S. federal and Oklahoma state government positions relating to housing. He served as chair of the Federal Housing Finance Board and president of the Government National Mortgage Association under president of the United States George W. Bush and as Oklahoma Secretary of Commerce under governor of Oklahoma Frank Keating.

== Early life and career ==
Rosenfeld graduated from the Wharton School at the University of Pennsylvania and received his J.D. degree from Harvard Law School. He then began a career in real estate development and investment banking. In 1981, Rosenfeld became a partner for Prescott, Ball and Turbent, a regional investment banking firm headquartered in Cleveland, Ohio. When that firm was acquired by Kemper Financial Services, Rosenfeld became that firm's Executive Vice President.

== George HW Bush administration ==
In 1989, Republican vice president of the United States George H. W. Bush was elected president, defeating Democratic governor of Massachusetts Michael Dukakis. Following Bush's inauguration, Rosenfeld was appointed by Housing and Urban Development Secretary Jack Kemp as Deputy Assistant Secretary of Housing with the Federal Housing Administration. While with the FHA, Rosenfeld had responsibility for overseeing both single family and multifamily housing programs of the FHA. He was later appointed as Deputy Assistant Secretary for Corporate Finance with the Department of the Treasury by Treasury Secretary Nicholas F. Brady in 1992.

== Private sector ==
Rosenfeld left the federal government in 1993 to become the Executive Vice President of NHP, Inc., and President of the National Corporation for Housing Partnerships, a firm involved in ownership and management of affordable multifamily housing.

== Keating administration ==
Rosenfeld moved to Oklahoma in 1995. In 1997 Republican Governor of Oklahoma Frank Keating appointed Rosenfeld as his second Oklahoma Secretary of Commerce. As Commerce Secretary, Rosenfeld oversaw all state agencies responsible for promoting economic development, community development and workforce development.

Following the 1998 Oklahoma general elections, Rosenfeld resigned as Secretary and returned to Washington, D.C. to seek private work. Governor Keating appointed Howard Barnett Jr., a Tulsa businessman, to succeed him.

== George W Bush administration ==
After three years in the private sector, Rosenfeld returned to the federal government. In July 2001, Republican President of the United States George W. Bush appointed him as president of the Government National Mortgage Association. He remained as Ginnie Mae President until December 14, 2005, when President Bush, through recess appointment, designated him chairman of the Federal Housing Finance Board (FHFB). During Rosenfeld's tenure as chairman, the FHFB was merged with the Office of Federal Housing Enterprise Oversight to create the Federal Housing Finance Agency as a result of the enactment of the Housing and Economic Recovery Act of 2008. Rosenfeld continued to serve as chairman until his resignation on December 31, 2008.

== Personal life ==
Rosenfeld is married to his wife Patti and they have six children.

Political offices
Preceded by Dean Werries	Oklahoma Secretary of Commerce; Under Governor Frank Keating; 1997–1998	Succeeded by Howard Barnett Jr.
Preceded by	President of the Government National Mortgage Association; Under President George W. Bush; July 2001 – December 14, 2005	Succeeded by Robert M. Couch
Preceded by Alicia R. Castaneda	Chairman of the Federal Housing Finance Board; Under President George W. Bush; December 14, 2005 – December 31, 2008	Succeeded by
