= 1998 Oklahoma gubernatorial election =

- November 3, 1998
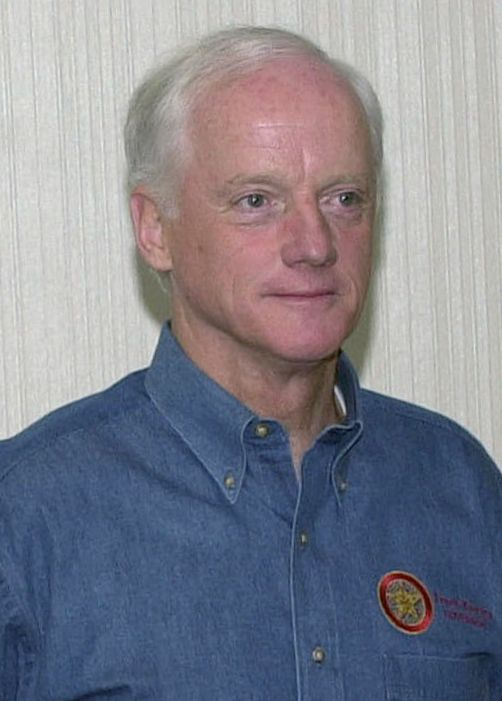

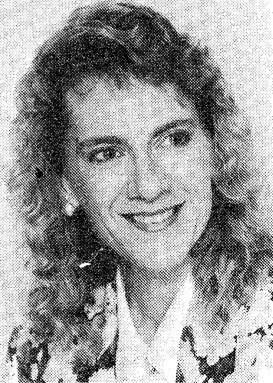
Nominee	Frank Keating	Laura Boyd
Party	Republican	Democratic
Popular vote	505,498	357,552
Percentage	57.86%	40.93%
- County results Keating: 40–50% 50–60% 60–70% 70–80% Boyd: 40–50% 50–60% 60–70%
Governor before election
Frank Keating
Republican
Elected Governor
Frank Keating
Republican

The 1998 Oklahoma gubernatorial election was held on November 3, 1998, and was a race for Governor of Oklahoma.

Incumbent Republican Frank Keating won re-election in a landslide against Democratic State Representative Laura Boyd. The Reform Party, the first alternative party to be able to run a candidate for governor in the state since 1970, had Hoppy Heidelberg as its candidate. Heidelberg was removed from a gubernatorial debate that he disrupted after not being allowed to be a participant.

This was the first occasion since Oklahoma statehood that Bryan, Carter, Cotton, Garvin, Greer, Harmon, Jefferson, Kiowa, Love, Murray, and Pontotoc counties voted for a Republican for Governor, although several of these counties backed Independent candidate Wes Watkins four years earlier.

This election marked the first time a woman received the nomination for governor from a major party in Oklahoma. It was also the first time a Republican was elected to a consecutive term (Henry Bellmon was the first Republican to serve two terms, though not consecutive).

== Primary election ==
Primary elections were held on August 25, 1998 with runoffs occurring on September 15, 1998, although no runoffs were required in the gubernatorial race.

=== Republican party ===
Incumbent governor Frank Keating was renominated without opposition after potential challenger Joe Vickers was removed from the primary ballot. Keating alleged that Vickers had changed his party registration from Democratic to Republican too late to appear on the Republican ballot. The state election board upheld Keating's challenge.

=== Democratic party ===
State representative Laura Boyd won the Democratic nomination over fellow representative James Hager. This was the first time since runoffs were reinstated in 1946 that the Democratic primary for governor without an incumbent did not require a subsequent runoff. (Note: No runoff was required in 1982 when incumbent George Nigh faced only token opposition in the primary.)

==== Candidates ====
- Laura Boyd, member of Oklahoma House of Representatives from Norman, Oklahoma
- James Hager, member of Oklahoma House of Representatives from Pawhuska, Oklahoma

==== Results ====
Democratic primary results
Party	Candidate	Votes	%
Democratic	Laura Boyd	171,121	60.24%
Democratic	James Hager	112,941	39.76%
Total votes		284,062	100.00%

== General election ==
In addition to Keating and Boyd, Hoppy Heidelberg, a former member of the Oklahoma City Bombing grand jury, ran on the Reform Party ticket.

=== Results ===
1998 gubernatorial election, Oklahoma
Party	Candidate	Votes	%	±%
Republican	Frank Keating (incumbent)	505,498	57.86%	+10.96%
Democratic	Laura Boyd	357,552	40.93%	+11.29%
Reform	Hoppy Heidelberg	10,535	1.21%	
Total votes		873,585	100.00%	
Majority		147,946	16.94%	
Republican hold		Swing	-0.33%	

=== Results by county ===
County	Frank Keating Republican		Laura Boyd Democratic		Hoppy Heidelberg Reform		Margin		Total votes cast
County	#	%	#	%	#	%	#	%	Total votes cast
Adair	2,111	48.96%	2,140	49.63%	61	1.41%	-29	-0.67%	4,312
Alfalfa	1,367	64.60%	726	34.31%	23	1.09%	641	30.29%	2,116
Atoka	1,658	48.00%	1,746	50.55%	50	1.45%	-88	-2.55%	3,454
Beaver	1,529	74.95%	466	22.84%	45	2.21%	1,063	52.11%	2,040
Beckham	2,673	61.50%	1,641	37.76%	32	0.74%	1,032	23.75%	4,346
Blaine	2,161	66.11%	1,052	32.18%	56	1.71%	1,109	33.92%	3,269
Bryan	4,476	53.73%	3,772	45.28%	83	1.00%	704	8.45%	8,331
Caddo	3,598	53.36%	3,077	45.63%	68	1.01%	521	7.73%	6,743
Canadian	15,873	74.14%	5,292	24.72%	244	1.14%	10,581	49.42%	21,409
Carter	6,978	57.13%	5,124	41.95%	112	0.92%	1,854	15.18%	12,214
Cherokee	4,083	41.89%	5,540	56.84%	123	1.26%	-1,457	-14.95%	9,746
Choctaw	1,657	43.69%	2,091	55.13%	45	1.19%	-434	-11.44%	3,793
Cimarron	906	75.50%	261	21.75%	33	2.75%	645	53.75%	1,200
Cleveland	30,960	60.57%	19,460	38.07%	693	1.36%	11,500	22.50%	51,113
Coal	838	46.61%	937	52.11%	23	1.28%	-99	-5.51%	1,798
Comanche	12,621	59.00%	8,578	40.10%	193	0.90%	4,043	18.90%	21,392
Cotton	1,182	56.23%	889	42.29%	31	1.47%	293	13.94%	2,102
Craig	1,589	35.96%	2,787	63.07%	43	0.97%	-1,198	-27.11%	4,419
Creek	8,431	50.27%	8,114	48.38%	226	1.35%	317	1.89%	16,771
Custer	4,616	64.89%	2,451	34.45%	47	0.66%	2,165	30.43%	7,114
Delaware	5,160	51.94%	4,635	46.66%	139	1.40%	525	5.28%	9,934
Dewey	1,171	68.20%	523	30.46%	23	1.34%	648	37.74%	1,717
Ellis	1,108	69.38%	463	28.99%	26	1.63%	645	40.39%	1,597
Garfield	11,191	65.04%	5,837	33.92%	178	1.03%	5,354	31.12%	17,206
Garvin	3,597	53.41%	3,056	45.37%	82	1.22%	541	8.03%	6,735
Grady	7,345	60.55%	4,606	37.97%	180	1.48%	2,739	22.58%	12,131
Grant	1,295	60.60%	800	37.44%	42	1.97%	495	23.16%	2,137
Greer	1,042	57.41%	757	41.71%	16	0.88%	285	15.70%	1,815
Harmon	471	52.57%	417	46.54%	8	0.89%	54	6.03%	896
Harper	904	59.99%	570	37.82%	33	2.19%	334	22.16%	1,507
Haskell	1,108	37.16%	1,837	61.60%	37	1.24%	-729	-24.45%	2,982
Hughes	1,682	45.08%	2,007	53.79%	42	1.13%	-325	-8.71%	3,731
Jackson	4,438	70.06%	1,862	29.39%	35	0.55%	2,576	40.66%	6,335
Jefferson	930	52.96%	811	46.18%	15	0.85%	119	6.78%	1,756
Johnston	1,350	47.75%	1,450	51.29%	27	0.96%	-100	-3.54%	2,827
Kay	9,030	63.37%	5,004	35.12%	215	1.51%	4,026	28.25%	14,249
Kingfisher	3,375	76.22%	1,001	22.61%	52	1.17%	2,374	53.61%	4,428
Kiowa	1,787	56.09%	1,369	42.97%	30	0.94%	418	13.12%	3,186
Latimer	991	35.41%	1,774	63.38%	34	1.21%	-783	-27.97%	2,799
Le Flore	5,446	47.39%	5,910	51.43%	136	1.18%	-464	-4.04%	11,492
Lincoln	5,621	62.71%	3,211	35.83%	131	1.46%	2,410	26.89%	8,963
Logan	5,564	66.08%	2,743	32.58%	113	1.34%	2,821	33.50%	8,420
Love	1,176	51.60%	1,084	47.56%	19	0.83%	92	4.04%	2,279
Major	1,997	72.99%	707	25.84%	32	1.17%	1,290	47.15%	2,736
Marshall	2,252	56.93%	1,670	42.21%	34	0.86%	582	14.71%	3,956
Mayes	4,000	40.05%	5,871	58.78%	117	1.17%	-1,871	-18.73%	9,988
McClain	4,385	61.60%	2,614	36.72%	119	1.67%	1,771	24.88%	7,118
McCurtain	2,926	43.23%	3,587	53.00%	255	3.77%	-661	-9.77%	6,768
McIntosh	2,437	39.02%	3,698	59.22%	110	1.76%	-1,261	-20.19%	6,245
Murray	1,763	49.72%	1,740	49.07%	43	1.21%	23	0.65%	3,546
Muskogee	7,761	42.51%	10,265	56.23%	230	1.26%	-2,504	-13.72%	18,256
Noble	2,180	62.75%	1,234	35.52%	60	1.73%	946	27.23%	3,474
Nowata	1,641	50.77%	1,546	47.83%	45	1.39%	95	2.94%	3,232
Okfuskee	1,432	45.78%	1,632	52.17%	64	2.05%	-200	-6.39%	3,128
Oklahoma	102,216	65.94%	50,977	32.89%	1,817	1.17%	51,239	33.06%	155,010
Okmulgee	3,428	38.95%	5,291	60.12%	82	0.93%	-1,863	-21.17%	8,801
Osage	4,700	42.65%	6,166	55.95%	154	1.40%	-1,466	-13.30%	11,020
Ottawa	3,555	43.71%	4,464	54.88%	115	1.41%	-909	-11.18%	8,134
Pawnee	1,969	48.94%	1,990	49.47%	64	1.59%	-21	-0.52%	4,023
Payne	10,283	60.97%	6,418	38.05%	165	0.98%	3,865	22.92%	16,866
Pittsburg	5,437	42.10%	7,339	56.82%	140	1.08%	-1,902	-14.73%	12,916
Pontotoc	6,297	54.72%	5,083	44.17%	128	1.11%	1,214	10.55%	11,508
Pottawatomie	10,336	61.29%	6,291	37.30%	238	1.41%	4,045	23.98%	16,865
Pushmataha	1,724	45.81%	1,987	52.80%	52	1.38%	-263	-6.99%	3,763
Roger Mills	949	66.18%	466	32.50%	19	1.32%	483	33.68%	1,434
Rogers	9,766	53.35%	8,253	45.09%	286	1.56%	1,513	8.27%	18,305
Seminole	3,159	47.70%	3,394	51.25%	70	1.06%	-235	-3.55%	6,623
Sequoyah	4,007	48.41%	4,141	50.03%	129	1.56%	-134	-1.62%	8,277
Stephens	9,355	65.63%	4,763	33.42%	136	0.95%	4,592	32.22%	14,254
Texas	3,222	74.69%	1,035	23.99%	57	1.32%	2,187	50.70%	4,314
Tillman	1,127	49.43%	1,131	49.61%	22	0.96%	-4	-0.18%	2,280
Tulsa	81,938	57.43%	59,346	41.59%	1,394	0.98%	22,592	15.83%	142,678
Wagoner	7,425	50.46%	7,067	48.03%	223	1.52%	358	2.43%	14,715
Washington	8,907	61.42%	5,438	37.50%	156	1.08%	3,469	23.92%	14,501
Washita	2,012	62.31%	1,173	36.33%	44	1.36%	839	25.98%	3,229
Woods	2,341	67.52%	1,099	31.70%	27	0.78%	1,242	35.82%	3,467
Woodward	3,482	65.07%	1,805	33.73%	64	1.20%	1,677	31.34%	5,351
Totals	505,498	57.86%	357,552	40.93%	10,535	1.21%	147,946	16.94%	873,585

==== Counties that flipped from Democratic to Republican ====
- Caddo
- Greer
- Harmon
- Kiowa
- Nowata

==== Counties that flipped from Independent to Republican ====
- Bryan
- Carter
- Cotton
- Dewey
- Garvin
- Jefferson
- Love
- Marshall
- Murray
- Payne
- Pontotoc

==== Counties that flipped from Republican to Democratic ====
- Adair
- Pawnee

==== Counties that flipped from Independent to Democratic ====
- Atoka
- Choctaw
- Coal
- Haskell
- Hughes
- Johnston
- Latimer
- Le Flore
- McCurtain
- Okfuskee
- Pittsburg
- Pushmataha
- Seminole
