= Lucy Hadi =

American politician (born 1946)

Lucy Hadi (born February 1946 in Amelia Island, Florida, U.S.A.) was Secretary of the Florida Department of Children and Families. She resigned one day after being found in contempt of court for failure to place a jail inmate found incompetent to stand trial because of mental illness in a treatment facility.

Before becoming Secretary of the Department of Children and Families, she worked as senior vice president of the United Way of Northeast Florida.
