= Executive Branch Reform Act of 1986 =

Oklahoma State Legislature
- Full name: Executive Branch Reform Act of 1986
- Signed into law: June 6, 1986
- Governor: George Nigh
- Website: 74 O.S. Section 10.1

The Executive Branch Reform Act of 1986 (74 O.S. Sections 10.1–10.4) is an Oklahoma state law that requires the Governor of Oklahoma to organize the various 500 or more departments, agencies, boards, commissions and other entities of the state's executive branch into a cabinet system. The act grouped state agencies into clusters with an informational link to a cabinet secretary. But the legislation stopped short of consolidating agencies or the decision-making authority of the agencies, boards and commissions.

Similarly, the Secretary of Education has no authority over the State Department of Education, State Regents for Higher Education, CareerTech Department or State Chancellor for Higher Education.

The Executive Branch Reform Act was signed into law by Governor George Nigh on June 6, 1986.

== Background ==
The executive branch of the government of Oklahoma continues to be divided into some 500 different departments, agencies, board and commissions, with each appointed commission member appointed by and (in theory) answering directly to the Governor of Oklahoma. For example, a 7-member board will become controlled by the new Governor after he appoints 4 members, which in most cases will occur in the 4th year of the Governor's term of office.

== Coordination Efforts with Office of Governor ==
To help better coordinate the actions of the executive branch, Governor David L. Boren began holding semi-official and semi-regular meetings with various heads of State agencies. Boren's successor, Governor George Nigh appointed the Nigh Commission to make recommendations to improve the efficiency of the State government. Following the Commission's report, Nigh pushed the Oklahoma Legislature to address these structural problems. The result was the Executive Branch Reform Act of 1986, which established a Cabinet system for the executive branch, and establish the Oklahoma State Cabinet with structured meetings with and reports to the Governor. However, the Cabinet members can influence but do not directly supervise or control the various 500 plus agencies, boards or commissions in the State Government of Oklahoma.

== Provisions of the Act ==
=== Cabinet area ===
The Act called for the creation of a Cabinet with no more than fifteen "Cabinet Areas". Each of these Cabinet Areas are to consist the state agencies with similar administrative or program objectives. Though composed of state agencies, these Cabinet Areas are not agencies themselves and do not exercise the executive power of the State. They only exist to better serve the Governor in crafting policy and information gathering. For example, the Oklahoma Department of Transportation and the Oklahoma Turnpike Authority are organized in the Transportation Cabinet Area.

Originally, the Act only mandated the creation of one Cabinet Area: one concerned with veterans affairs. It has since been amended to mandate the creation of a new Cabinet Area concerned with information technology. Other than those two Cabinet Areas, the Governor is free to create such other Cabinet Areas, with such program objects, as he may deem necessary.

=== Limited Power of Cabinet Secretaries ===
All Cabinet Areas are headed officers who hold the title of "Secretary". For instance, the head of the Energy Cabinet Area is titled the Secretary of Energy. All Cabinet Secretaries are appointed by the Governor, with the approval of the Oklahoma Senate, and serve at the pleasure of the Governor. Each Secretary advises the Governor on any policy changes or problems within their Cabinet Area, represents the Governor in administering their Cabinet Area, and coordinates information gathering on their Cabinet Area for the Governor or Legislature when so required. However, the Secretaries are not an officer of the State government and does not possess the executive power of the State. They have no authority to direct or control any agency within their Cabinet Area except his own direct staff neither do they have the authority to hire or fire personnel in their Cabinet Area except those on his own direct staff. The component agencies are directed and controlled by their respective department heads. The Secretaries may only direct a component agency when previously authorization by the Governor through executive order.

The Governor is free to appoint any person he desires as a Cabinet Secretary, including the head of an agency. Any agency head within a Cabinet Area is allowed to as a Cabinet Secretary. This is because Secretary positions are semi-formal and are not legally classified as "officers of the State". For example, Governor Brad Henry appointed Kevin Ward, the Commissioner of the Oklahoma Department of Public Safety, to serve as his Secretary of Safety and Security. This allows Secretary Ward general policy supervision over the Safety and Security Cabinet Area and direct executive control over the Department of Public Safety. The only exception to this rule is that an agency head in one Cabinet Area may not serve as a Cabinet Secretary for another Cabinet Area. For instance, the Commissioner of the Oklahoma Department of Agriculture (which is in the Agriculture Cabinet Area) may not serve as the Secretary of Health. Because of this distinction in offices, should the Governor dismiss a Cabinet Secretary that is also an agency head, their dismissal as a Secretary will not affect their position as an agency head.

An alternative to selecting an agency head as a Cabinet Secretary is when the Governor appoints a private citizen to the post. Examples include when Governor Henry appointed Dr. Joseph W. Alexander, a professor at Oklahoma State University-Stillwater, as his Secretary of Science and Technology.

=== Formation ===
The Governor, within 45 days of taking office, must organize his Cabinet. Each Governor is allowed to organize the agencies however he feels best serves him. When he took office in 1995, Governor Frank Keating established a Secretary of Commerce and a Secretary of Tourism. This was changed in 2003 when Governor Brad Henry establish a single Secretary of Commerce and Tourism. Following the Oklahoma Supreme Court case of Keating v. Edmondson in 2001, it was deemed illegal for a Governor to change the Cabinet Areas and their component agencies past the 45-day deadline without the approval of the Legislature.

== See also ==
- List of Oklahoma state agencies
- Oklahoma Governor's Cabinet
- Governor of Oklahoma
