= Dean Werries =

American businessman

E. Dean Werries

Chairman of Sonic Drive-In
- In office 1995–2000
- Succeeded by: J. Clifford Hudson

Oklahoma Secretary of Commerce
- In office 1995–1997
- Governor: Frank Keating
- Succeeded by: Ron Rosenfeld

Personal details
- Born: 1926
- Died: April 25, 2012 Oklahoma City, Oklahoma
- Occupation: Businessman

E. Dean Werries (1926–2012) was an American businessman from Oklahoma. Werries previously served as the Oklahoma Secretary of Commerce under Governor of Oklahoma Frank Keating from 1995 to 1997. Prior to his service as Secretary, Werries served as chairman of Sonic and as chairman and chief executive officer of the Fleming Companies, Inc.

== Career with Flemings ==
Werries joined the Fleming Companies, Inc, a Kansas, later Oklahoma-based supplier of consumer package goods to retailers, in 1955. In 1981, he came that firm's President. He remained in that position until 1988 when he became Fleming's chief executive officer. Werries retired as CEO in October 1993 to become the chairman of the board of directors for Fleming. He continued to serve as chairman until 1994, when he retired as the age of 64.

== Career with Sonic ==
While still CEO of Fleming, Werries was elected to the board of directors for Sonic Drive-In in 1991. When Werries retired from Fleming in 1994, Sonic shareholders elected him as the chairman of their board of directors. He remained with Sonic until his retirement in 2000. J. Clifford Hudson, Sonic's CEO, was elected as board chair to succeed Werries.

Following his retirement, he was named director emeritus, which allowed him to participate in all meetings of Sonic's board of directors but not the right to vote.

== Secretary of Commerce ==
In 1995, Republican Governor of Oklahoma Frank Keating appointed Werries as his first Secretary of Commerce. As Secretary, Werries oversaw the operations of the Oklahoma Department of Commerce. He remained in that position until he resigned in 1997. Governor Keating appointed Ron Rosenfeld, a housing development expert, to succeed Werries as Secretary.

== Personal life ==
Werries has served on the board of directors for Oklahoma Christian University and has served as a trustee of the Oklahoma School of Science and Mathematics Foundation.

Political offices
Preceded by	Oklahoma Secretary of Commerce; Under Governor Frank Keating; 1995–1997	Succeeded by Ron Rosenfeld
