= Oklahoma Office of Personnel Management =

- Great Seal of Oklahoma

Agency overview
- Formed: July 1, 1982
- Preceding agency: Oklahoma Merit System Office
- Dissolved: 2011
- Superseding agency: Oklahoma Office of Management and Enterprise Services
- Headquarters: 2101 N Lincoln Boulevard; Oklahoma City, Oklahoma
- Employees: 59 classified 22 unclassified
- Annual budget: $2.6 million
- Minister responsible: Preston Doerflinger, Secretary of Finance and Revenue
- Agency executive: Lucinda Meltabarger, Administrator
- Website: Oklahoma Office of Personnel Management

The Oklahoma Office of Personnel Management (OPM) was an agency of the government of Oklahoma which was dissolved in 2011. OPM managed the civil service of the state government. OPM previously provided comprehensive human resource services to all state agencies and employees (excluding institutions of higher education), as well as information for individuals interested in state service careers. OPM, together with the Oklahoma Merit Protection Commission, was responsible for administering and enforcing the State Merit System.

The Office of Personnel Management was created as an independent agency in 1982 during the term of Governor George Nigh as the successor to the Merit System Office. OPM was consolidated into the Office of State Finance in 2011 during the term of Governor Mary Fallin.

== Functions ==
The Office of Personnel Management, in partnership with the Oklahoma Merit Protection Commission, administers a variety of personnel-related management systems and services within state government to ensuring a professional and non-political civil service. In addition to administering the Merit System, the OPM provides a wide variety of personnel-related services and regulatory functions affecting all agencies and employees in all branches of state government. It is the responsibility of OPM to maintain a central clearing house of all classified job openings for the state government.

=== Classified and unclassified ===
OPM has total jurisdiction over state employees that are in the classified service and very limited jurisdiction over unclassified service employees. Classified employees are all state employees and positions which are subject to rules of OPM and the decisions of the Oklahoma Merit Protection Commission. This is as opposed to the unclassified service, which are at-will employees. The two primary distinctions between classified and unclassified employees are as follows:

- unclassified employees serve at the pleasure of the appointing authority. They may be removed from their position at any time, with or without cause, and have no right to appeal their termination to the Commission.
- unclassified employees are non-competitive positions. They are appointed by the appointing authority without regard to merit provisions, such as publicly publishing the position opening and rating eligible candidates.

== Leadership ==
The Office is under the supervision of the Director of State Finance and subject to the direct executive control of the Administrator of the Office. The Administrator is appointed by the Director to serve at his pleasure. Prior to reforms enacted in 2011, the Administrator was appointed by and reported directly to the Governor of Oklahoma. The last Administrator appointed by a Governor was Oscar B. Jackson Jr., who served in that position from 1991 until his retirement in 2011 following the reforms.

== Organization ==
- Cabinet Secretary
- Director of State Finance
  - Administrator
    - Deputy Administrator for Programs
      - State Employee Assistance Program Department
      - Employee Selection Services Department
        - Personnel Assessment Division
        - Applicant Services Division
      - Office of Equal Opportunity and Workforce Diversity
      - Human Resources Development Services Department
      - Agency Payroll Support Services Department
      - Management Services Department
        - Classification Division
        - Compensation Division
      - Office of Workforce Planning
    - Associate Administrator for Financial Management and Chief Financial Officer
      - Financial Management Services Department
    - General Counsel
      - Legal Affairs Department
    - Office of Legislative Affairs

== Supporting agencies ==
- Affirmative Action Review Council
- Governor's Advisory Council on Asian American Affairs
- Governor's Ethnic American Advisory Council
- Employee Assistance Program Advisory Council
- Committee for Incentive Awards for State Employees
- Governor’s Advisory Council on Latin American and Hispanic Affairs
- Mentor Selection Advisory Committee
- Oversight Committee for State Employee Charitable Contributions

== See also ==
- Office of Personnel Management (Federal government)
- Office of Management and Budget
