= Frank Keating =

American politician (born 1944)

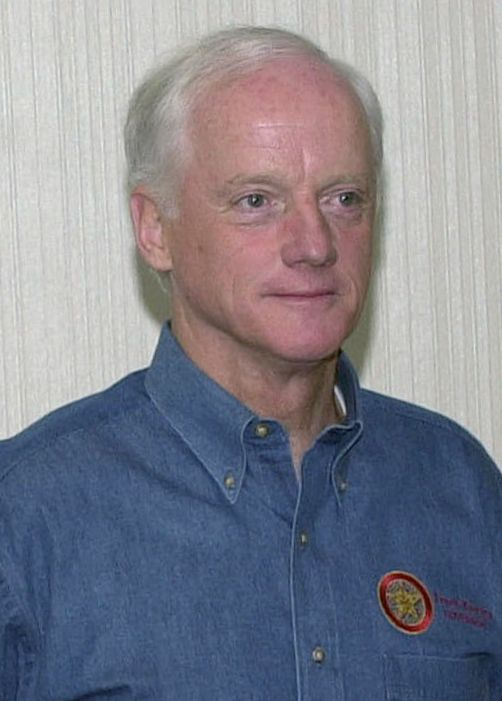
- Keating in 2001

25th Governor of Oklahoma
- In office January 9, 1995 – January 13, 2003
- Lieutenant: Mary Fallin
- Preceded by: David Walters
- Succeeded by: Brad Henry

United States Deputy Secretary of Housing and Urban Development
- In office 1992–1993
- President: George H. W. Bush
- Preceded by: Alfred A. DelliBovi
- Succeeded by: Terrence R. Duvernay

United States Associate Attorney General
- In office 1988–1990
- President: Ronald Reagan; George H. W. Bush
- Preceded by: Stephen S. Trott
- Succeeded by: Wayne Budd

United States Attorney for the Northern District of Oklahoma
- In office 1981–1983
- President: Ronald Reagan
- Preceded by: Hubert H. Bryant
- Succeeded by: Layn R. Phillips

Member of the Oklahoma Senate from the 38th district
- In office January 1975 – January 1981
- Preceded by: Peyton Breckinridge
- Succeeded by: Wayne Winn

Member of the Oklahoma House of Representatives from the 70th district
- In office January 1973 – January 1975
- Preceded by: Richard Hancock
- Succeeded by: Paul Brunton

Personal details
- Born: David Rowland Keating; February 10, 1944 (age 82) St. Louis, Missouri, U.S.
- Party: Republican
- Spouse: Catherine Heller (m. 1972)
- Children: 3, including Chip Keating
- Education: Georgetown University (BA); University of Oklahoma (JD)

Francis Anthony Keating II (born David Rowland Keating; February 10, 1944) is an American attorney, politician, and a former FBI special agent who served as the 25th governor of Oklahoma from 1995 to 2003.

As of the 2022 Oklahoma gubernatorial election, Keating is one of only five governors in Oklahoma history, in addition to George Nigh, Brad Henry, Mary Fallin, and Kevin Stitt to hold consecutive terms and the first Republican to accomplish that feat. As governor, he oversaw the state's response to the Oklahoma City bombing. His term was also marked by the enactment of welfare reform and tax cuts.

Keating oversaw the execution of 52 people under his term as governor, a record unmatched as of 2023.

== Early life ==
Keating was born on February 10, 1944, in St. Louis, Missouri, the son of Mary Ann (Martin) and Anthony Francis Keating. He was born David Rowland Keating, but his name was changed to Francis Anthony Keating II when he was two. Before he was six months old, his family moved to Oklahoma and settled in Tulsa. A practicing Catholic, Keating attended Monte Cassino School then Cascia Hall Preparatory School in Tulsa, graduating in 1962. Keating attended Georgetown University in Washington, D.C. where he was president of the college student body, an editor of The Hoya, and a member of the Philodemic Debating Society, receiving his Bachelor of Arts in history, in 1966. He obtained a J.D. from the University of Oklahoma College of Law, in 1969, where he also was student body president.

Upon completing law school, Keating began his career in law enforcement. The same year he finished law school, Keating was made a Special agent for the Federal Bureau of Investigation. Relocated to the West Coast, Keating was charged with investigating terrorism incidents in the area and other various duties. After years on the coast, Keating returned to Tulsa to become an assistant district attorney.

In 1973, Keating, was elected to the Oklahoma House of Representatives. He would serve a single term in the House, until 1975, when he was elected to the Oklahoma Senate. He would serve in the Senate from 1975 until 1981. While in the Senate, Keating became the minority leader.

== Federal career ==
Keating's law enforcement career and prominence in the Oklahoma Republican Party prompted newly elected President Ronald Reagan to appoint Keating as the U.S. Attorney for the Northern District of Oklahoma. Keating served from 1981 until 1983, serving for part of that time as chairman of all U.S. Attorneys. During this time, he was one of three US Attorneys in Oklahoma handling the Oklahoma county commissioner scandal, which resulted in conviction of 230 people, including 110 county commissioners, for public corruption. He gave up that post in 1983 to run for Congress in Oklahoma's 1st congressional district and ran a competitive race which fell short of defeating Democratic Congressman and House Budget Committee chairman James R. Jones, who won re-election with 52 percent of the vote even though Republican President Reagan carried the district.

Shortly after Reagan was sworn in for his second term, he appointed Keating to serve as an assistant secretary of the Treasury and later elevated him to associate attorney general, the third ranking official within the U.S. Department of Justice. These appointments made Keating the highest ranking Oklahoman during the Reagan administration. In his positions as assistant secretary of the Treasury and associate attorney general, Keating oversaw both the Justice and Treasury's law enforcement agencies. These included the United States Customs Service, the Bureau of Alcohol, Tobacco, and Firearms, the Secret Service, the Federal Law Enforcement Training Center, the Federal Bureau of Prisons, the U.S. Marshals, the Immigration and Naturalization Service, all 94 U.S. Attorneys and the U.S. role in Interpol.

Late in the Reagan Administration, Keating continued to serve in the Justice Department in his role as associate attorney general. In 1990, President Bush elevated Keating to general counsel and acting deputy secretary of Housing and Urban Development, that department's second highest office, under Secretary Jack Kemp. He would serve as deputy secretary until 1993. As was the case in the Reagan administration, Keating became the highest ranking Oklahoman in the federal government, under Bush.

On November 14, 1991, Bush nominated Keating to a seat on the U.S. Court of Appeals for the Tenth Circuit, but with Democratic control of the U.S. Senate Judiciary Committee, Keating's nomination languished and no hearing was held before Bush's presidency ended. President Bill Clinton chose not to renominate Keating, instead nominating former Oklahoma Attorney General Robert Harlan Henry, who was subsequently confirmed.

== Gubernatorial campaigns ==
=== 1994 ===
After two years of private life, in 1994, Keating received the Republican nomination for Governor of Oklahoma. In a three-way race against Democratic nominee Jack Mildren and independent Wes Watkins, Keating was elected with just under 47 percent of the vote. He was undoubtedly helped by the presence of Watkins, a former Democratic Congressman, on the ballot; Watkins siphoned off a number of votes that would have likely gone to Mildren in a two-way race with Keating; his 233,300 votes far exceeded Keating's 171,000-vote margin of victory. Keating was sworn in as the 25th Governor of Oklahoma on January 9, 1995. He was only the third Republican ever to hold the post.

=== 1998 ===
Keating faced Democratic state Representative Laura Boyd, the first woman to receive a major party's nomination for Oklahoma Governor, in his 1998 re-election campaign. Keating won by a comfortable margin, the second of five Governors in Oklahoma history to win two consecutive terms (after George Nigh) and preceding Democrat Brad Henry. He was the only Republican to do so before Mary Fallin in 2014

== Governor of Oklahoma ==
The Cabinet of Governor Frank Keating (1995–2003)
Office	Name	Term
Governor	Frank Keating	1995–2003
Lieutenant Governor	Mary Fallin	1995–2003
Secretary of State	Tom Cole	1995–1999
	Michael J. Hunter	1999–2002
	Kay Dudley	2002–2003
Attorney General	Drew Edmondson	1995–2003
State Auditor and Inspector	Clifton Scott	1995–2003
State Treasurer	Robert Butkin	1995–2003
Insurance Commissioner	John Crawford	1995–1999
	Carroll Fisher	1999–2003
Labor Commissioner	Brenda Reneau	1995–2003
Superintendent of Public Instruction	Sandy Garrett	1995–2003
Secretary of Administration	Tom Brennan	1995–1997
	Pam Warren	1997–2003
Secretary of Agriculture	Dennis Howard	1995–2003
Secretary of Commerce	Dean Werries	1995–1997
	Ron Rosenfeld	1997–1998
	Howard Barnett Jr.	1998–1999	
	Russell M. Perry	1999–2000
	Vacant	2000–2003
Secretary of Education	Floyd Coppedge	1995–2003	
Secretary of Energy	Carl Michael Smith	1995–2002
	Robert J. Sullivan Jr.	2002–2003
Secretary of the Environment	Gary Sherrer	1995–1997
	Brian C. Griffin	1997–2003
Secretary of Finance and Revenue	Tom Daxon	1995–2003
Secretary of Health and Human Services	Ken Lackey	1995–1997
	Jerry Regier	1997–2002
	Howard Hendrick	2002–2003
Secretary of Human Resources	Oscar B. Jackson Jr.	1995–2003
Secretary of the Military	Stephen Cortright	1995–2003
Secretary of Safety and Security	Robert Ricks	1995–2003
Secretary of Science and Technology	W. Arthur Porter	1999–2003
Secretary of Tourism and Recreation	Edward H. Cook	1995–1999	
	Jane Jayroe	1999–2003
Secretary of Transportation	Neal A. McCaleb	1995–2001
	Herschal Crow	2001–2003
Secretary of Veterans Affairs	Norman Lamb	1995–2003

=== Oklahoma City bombing ===
Within three months of taking office, on April 19, the Alfred P. Murrah Federal Building in Oklahoma City was destroyed in the Oklahoma City bombing, in which the lives of 168 people were lost and over 800 people were injured. The blast destroyed or damaged more than 300 buildings in the surrounding area, leaving several hundred people homeless and shutting down business.

Governor Keating mobilized relief and rescue teams to handle the crisis. Over 12,000 people participated in relief and rescue operations in the days following the blast. The national and worldwide humanitarian response was immediate and overwhelming. Governor Keating declared a state of emergency, which allowed the Federal Emergency Management Agency (FEMA) to activate 11 of its Urban Search and Rescue Task Forces to assist in rescue and recovery operations.

The national focus climaxed on April 23, when President Bill Clinton, along with Governor Keating and the Reverend Billy Graham, spoke in Oklahoma City. In the weeks following the bombing, rescue efforts ceased and the building was imploded. Through both his own works and the works of his wife Cathy Keating, Governor Keating gained both national and international attention for his efforts to help the victims and their families. Governor Keating also created a $6 million fund to assist victims and provide for college scholarships for children who lost a parent, or both parents, in the attack.

=== First term ===
Governor Keating set out with an agenda for the state under his administration, with many of his initiatives passed, despite an often hostile Democratic controlled Legislature. Many of Keating's proposals were policies designed for growth and reform for Oklahoma. These included education reform, environmental protection, tax relief, road building, economic development, public safety, and tougher law enforcement. Keating created a public-private partnership to assure care for the indigent as well as a stronger medical education program.

Keating's first major success was the passage of the first welfare reform law in the nation in 1995. The success of the law served as a model for President Clinton's welfare reform act of 1996. Keating managed to improve road and highway conditions throughout the state without raising taxes.

Keating implemented tougher parole policies and introduced a landmark truth-in-sentencing legislation. Keating also provided no amnesty when handling death sentence criminals, allowing all of those sentenced to death to be executed. Keating also raised the salaries of Oklahoma's state troopers from the lowest in the nation to the 24th highest.

Keating appointed a special task force that created tougher regulations on Oklahoma's hog and poultry industries.

In 1998, Keating became the first governor in 50 years to achieve a tax cut in the state's income tax. This combined with reduction in the sales tax, estate tax, and unemployment tax formed the largest tax break in the state's history until that point.

=== Second term ===
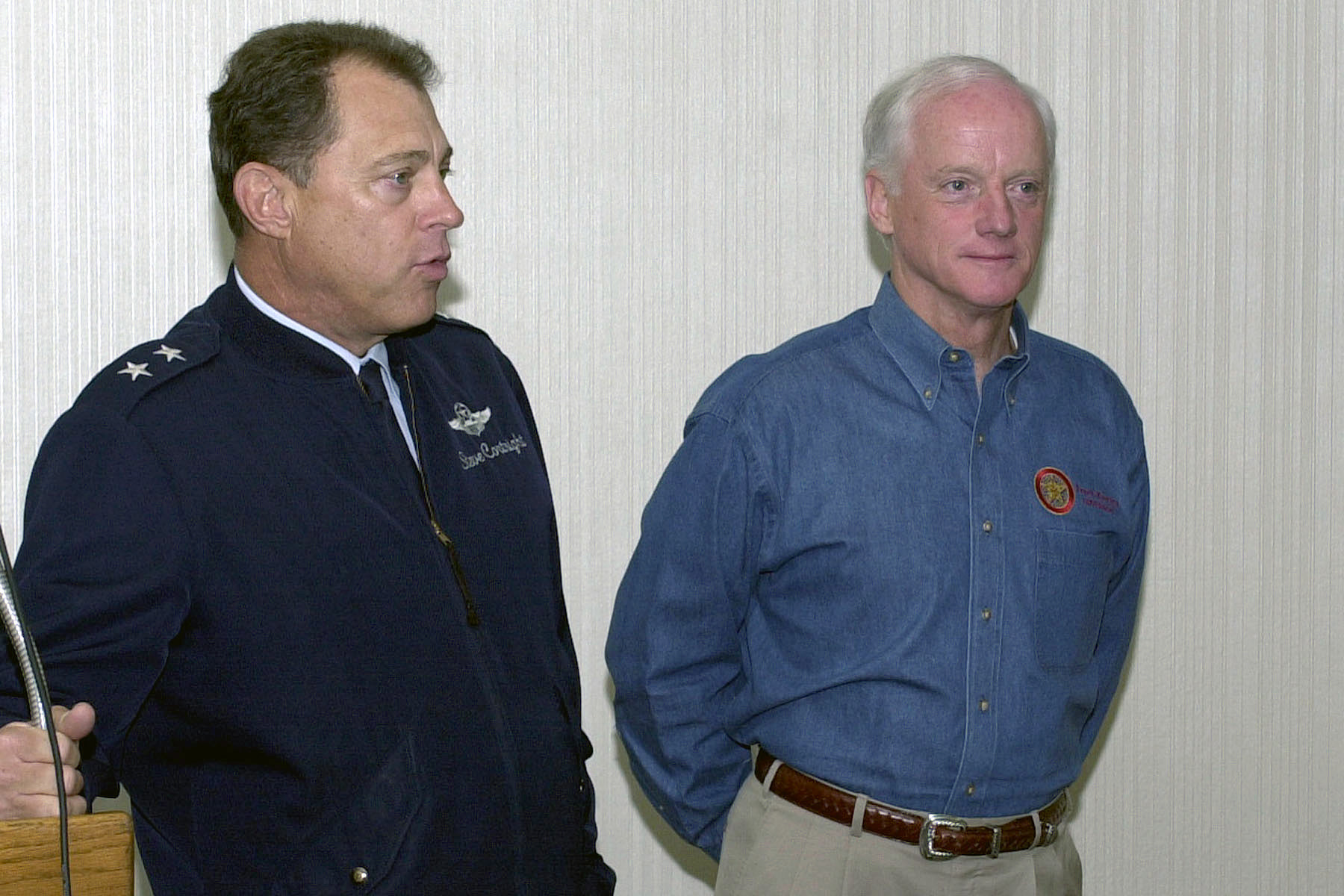
Keating with Oklahoma Adjutant General Stephen Cortright in 2001

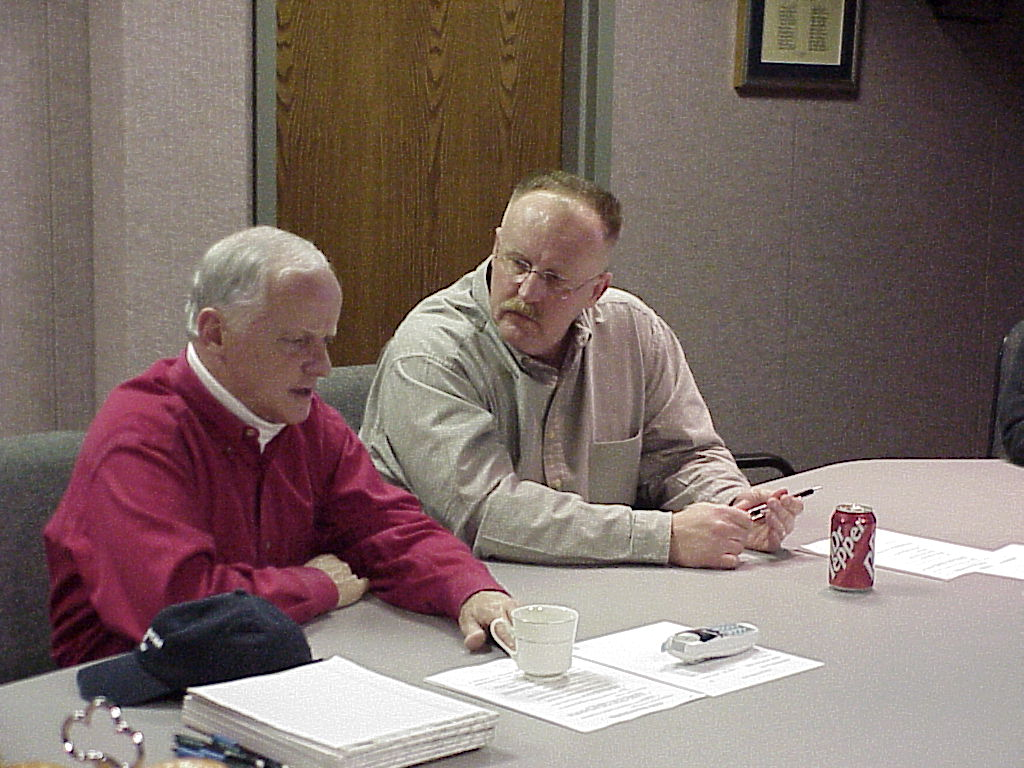
Keating with FEMA Administrator Joe Allbaugh in 2002

Sworn in on January 11, 1999, Keating's second term began with a progressive agenda, based primarily on education. In his 1999 inaugural address, Keating set four goals for Oklahoma for his second term:

1. Raising Oklahoma's ACT to the national average by 2005,
2. Decreasing Oklahoma's divorce rate by 50% before 2010,
3. Ensure one out of every three Oklahomans has a college degree by 2010, and
4. Raising Oklahoma's per capita income to reach the national average by 2025

Keating focused largely on education. He increased spending for common, vo-tech, and higher education facilities throughout the state and introduced charter schools to Oklahoma for the first time. His policies and recommendations on education to the Legislature lead to the largest investment, over $100 million, on higher education. Keating, in 2000, also raised teacher pay by over $3000 annually, the largest raise Oklahoma's teacher had ever experienced. Keating even managed to get higher educational facilities attracted to Tulsa for the first time. His legislative agenda required that all Oklahoma students take three years of math and four years of English, History and Science before graduation.

Along with the agenda set forth in his inaugural address, Keating sought to address out-of-wedlock births, substance abuse, and child abuse. Enlisting state government, community groups, and faith organizations, he organized the statewide initiative to strengthen marriage.

Keating struggled to get workers' compensation reform and right to work laws enacted due to the political makeup of the Oklahoma Legislature. Keating adjusted policies, made new appointments to Oklahoma's Worker's Compensation Court, and took other measures to control Oklahoma's rising worker's compensation costs. He would have to wait two years to see his vision for a right to work fulfilled. The Legislature decided to propose anti-union right to work measures as a 2001 constitutional amendment. Keating's six-year battle came to an end when, on September 21, 2001, Oklahomans approved the measure.

As he had done in first term, Keating sought to grant broad-based tax cuts. To further reduce taxes, Keating won passage of an income tax break and of the creation of Oklahoma's earned income credit system to benefit the poor. Also, under Keating's auspices, both Democratic and Republican leaders in the Legislature launched studies to examine Oklahoma's tax system, with the purpose of overhauling the entire system. During the study, the complete elimination of Oklahoma's income tax was proposed.

Keating signed a major criminal justice bill that reformed Truth in Sentencing law in Oklahoma.

In other legislative initiatives, Keating signed the repeal of Oklahoma's annual vehicle inspection program. He also granted state correctional officers and highway patrol troopers pay raises. Keating addressed the problems faced in Oklahoma's Tar Creek Superfund site by appointing a task force on the issue.

Among Keating's other accomplishments; overseeing the largest road construction project in Oklahoma history and leading his state through devastating tornadoes in 1999. As a crowning achievement, Keating raised more than $20 million in private money towards completion of the Oklahoma State Capitol with a dome. The capitol was originally designed for a dome, but state funding for it had run dry during World War I.

Term limits prevented him from running for a third term; he was succeeded by Brad Henry as governor.

=== Judicial appointments ===
Governor Keating appointed the following members of the Judiciary of Oklahoma:

==== Appellate courts ====
#	Judge	Position	Court	District	Former Judge	Appointment date	End of service	Successor Judge
1	Kenneth L. Buettner	Judge	Civil Appeals	5th		January 26, 1996	December 31, 2020	Thomas E. Prince
2	Stephen Lile	Judge	Criminal Appeals	5th		November 6, 1998	March 1, 2005	David B. Lewis
3	Daniel J. Boudreau	Justice	Supreme Court	6th	Robert D. Simms	October 12, 1999	September 1, 2004	Tom Colbert
4	James Winchester	Justice	Supreme Court	5th	Alma Wilson	January 4, 2000	Incumbent	Incumbent
5	Tom Colbert	Judge	Civil Appeals	1st		March 6, 2000	September 1, 2004	
6	E. Bay Mitchell	Judge	Civil Appeals	6th	James P. Garrett	February 20, 2002	Incumbent	Incumbent

==== Trial courts ====
#	Judge	Position	County	District	Former Judge	Appointment date	End of service	Successor Judge
1	Jon D. Douthitt	Associate District Judge	Harper	1st		1996		
2	D. W. Boyd	District Judge	Kay	2nd		1996		
3	Roma M. McElwee	District Judge	Oklahoma	7th		1996		
4	John C. Garrett	District Judge	Adair	15th		1996	2006	Jeff Payton
5	William R. Burkett	District Judge	Oklahoma	7th		1996	1999	
6	P. Thomas Thornbrugh	District Judge	Tulsa	14th		1997	2011	
7	Gregory Kent Frizzell	District Judge	Tulsa	14th		1997	2007	
8	J. Michael Gassett	District Judge	Tulsa	14th		1997		
9	Richard Van Dyck	District Judge	Caddo	6th		1997		
10	Harry M. Wyatt III	Associate District Judge	Craig	12th		1997	2003	
11	Norman Russell	Associate District Judge	Kiowa	3rd		1998		
12	Noma Gurich	District Judge	Oklahoma	7th		1998	2010	
13	David B. Lewis	District Judge	Comanche	5th		1999	2005	
14	Vicki L. Robertson	District Judge	Oklahoma	7th		1999		
15	Deirdre Dexter	Associate District Judge	Tulsa	14th		2000		
16	Ryan Reddick	Associate District Judge	Texas	1st		2000		
17	Mickey Hadwiger	Associate District Judge	Woods	4th		2001		
18	Elizabeth Brown	Associate District Judge	Adair	15th		2002	Incumbent	Incumbent
19	Jack Hammontree	Associate District Judge	Grant	4th		2002		
20	Keith B. Aycock	District Judge	Comanche	5th		2002		
21	David M. Harbour	District Judge	Oklahoma	7th		2002		

==== Courts of limited jurisdiction ====
#	Judge	Court	Seat	Former Judge	Appointment date	End of service	Successor Judge
1	Ellen C. Edwards	Workers Compensation Court	1st		1996	2002	Reappointed
2	Richard L. Blanchard	Workers Compensation Court	2nd		1996	2002	Reappointed
3	Richard G. Mason	Workers Compensation Court	3rd		1996	2002	Reappointed
4	Kenton W. Fulton	Workers Compensation Court	10th		1996	2002	Reappointed
5	Jimmy D. Filosa	Workers Compensation Court	7th		1996	1998	Reappointed
6	D. Craig Johnston	Workers Compensation Court	6th		1998		
7	Jimmy D. Filosa	Workers Compensation Court	7th		1998		
8	Carol “Gene” Prigmore	Workers Compensation Court	8th		1998	2000	Reappointed
9	Susan W. Conyers	Workers Compensation Court	4th		2000		
10	Jerry L. Salyer	Workers Compensation Court	5th		2000		
11	Carol “Gene” Prigmore	Workers Compensation Court	8th		2000		
12	Cherri Farrar	Workers Compensation Court	9th		2000		
13	Ellen C. Edwards	Workers Compensation Court	1st		2002		
14	Richard L. Blanchard	Workers Compensation Court	2nd		2002		
15	Richard G. Mason	Workers Compensation Court	3rd		2002		
16	Kenton W. Fulton	Workers Compensation Court	10th		2002		

== 2000 presidential election ==
During the 2000 presidential election, Keating, while still Governor of Oklahoma, was considered a potential candidate for the Republican nomination of Vice President of the United States under George W. Bush.

== Post-governorship ==
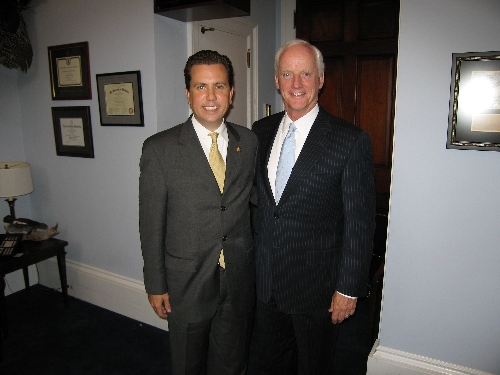
Keating with Dan Boren in 2006

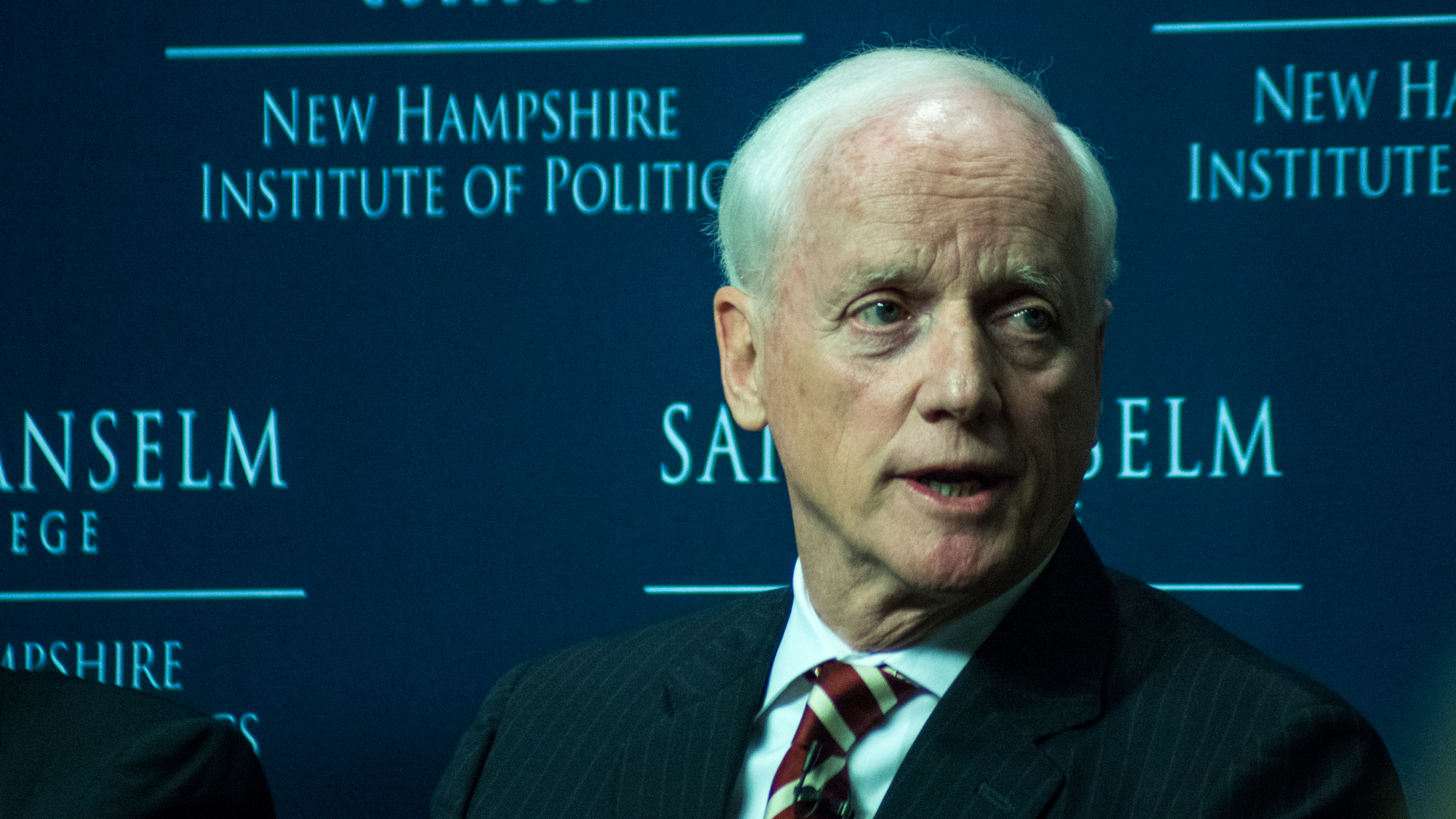
Keating in 2015

In 2002 he authored a children's book about Oklahoma humorist Will Rogers. Another children's book about Theodore Roosevelt followed in 2006. Keating's third children's book about the trial of Standing Bear was published in 2008. His most recent children's book about George Washington was published in 2012. Keating also served on the boards of the National Archives, the Jamestown Foundation, the Federal City Council, and Mt. Vernon. He was president of the Federal City Council and chairman of the Mount Vernon Advisory Board. He currently lives in McLean, Virginia

Keating and his wife Cathy are the parents of three children, Carrie, Kelly, and Chip. In 2001, Cathy Keating was an unsuccessful candidate for the Republican nomination to one of Oklahoma's seats in the U.S. House of Representatives being vacated by Steve Largent. In 2006, Chip Keating was an unsuccessful candidate for the Republican nomination to a seat in the Oklahoma House of Representatives.

On December 2, 2006, columnist Robert Novak suggested Keating might be a candidate for the 2008 Republican presidential nomination.

On December 20, 2006, Keating visited Columbia, South Carolina, where he spoke to a group of GOP supporters about a possible 2008 Presidential bid. On January 17, 2007, Keating was quoted in the Tulsa World as declining a possible run for the U.S. presidency in 2008. His reasons for not running were associated with the relative head starts in preparations of U.S. Senator John McCain and former Massachusetts Governor Mitt Romney. In February 2007 Keating appeared in Spartanburg, South Carolina and endorsed McCain's bid.

Following his two terms as governor, Keating accepted a position as president and chief executive officer of the American Council of Life Insurers, the trade association for the life insurance and retirement security industry. Keating's former Secretary of State, Michael J. Hunter, served alongside his former boss at ACLI where Hunter served as Executive Vice President and Chief Operating Officer.

On January 1, 2011, Keating became president and CEO of the American Bankers Association. Founded in 1875, the American Bankers Association represents banks of all sizes and charters and is the voice for the nation's $14 trillion banking industry and its 2 million employees.

Keating served as a member of the Debt Reduction Task Force and Housing Commission at the Bipartisan Policy Center.

Amid the immigration debate of 2013, Keating wrote an op-ed in which he announced support for the bipartisan Senate comprehensive immigration reform bill, arguing among other things that the bill's passage would shore up the future solvency of Social Security and Medicare.

On February 4, 2016, Keating joined the law firm of Holland & Knight as a partner.

On March 14, 2017, Keating was nominated by Oklahoma Governor Mary Fallin to serve on the University of Oklahoma Board of Regents.

In April 2017, Keating created a one-minute video regretting his support for wind energy while Oklahoma governor. "We made a mistake...this is a calamity for taxpayers".

== Events ==
- April 19, 1995: Three months after he was sworn in as Oklahoma governor, a fertilizer bomb exploded in front of a federal building in the capital killing 168 people.
- June 2002: Keating, a practicing Roman Catholic, was named chairman of the U.S. Conference of Catholic Bishops National Review Board examining sex abuse by Catholic priests.
  - June 16, 2003: Keating stepped down from the Review Board. The resignation came days after Los Angeles Cardinal Roger Mahony criticized Keating for comparing some church leaders to the Mafia. In his resignation letter, Keating said, "My remarks, which some Bishops found offensive, were deadly accurate. I make no apology.... To resist Grand Jury subpoenas, to suppress the names of offending clerics, to deny, to obfuscate, to explain away; that is the model of a criminal organization, not my church."

== See also ==
- George H. W. Bush judicial appointment controversies
- Keating v. Edmondson
- 47th Oklahoma Legislature
- 48th Oklahoma Legislature

Legal offices
Preceded by Stephen Trott	United States Associate Attorney General; 1988–1990	Succeeded by Wayne Budd
Party political offices
Preceded by Bill Price	Republican nominee for Governor of Oklahoma; 1994, 1998	Succeeded by Steve Largent
Preceded by David Beasley	Chair of the Republican Governors Association; 1998–1999	Succeeded by Ed Schafer
Political offices
Preceded by David Walters	Governor of Oklahoma; 1995–2003	Succeeded by Brad Henry
U.S. order of precedence (ceremonial)
Preceded by David Walters as Former Governor	Order of precedence of the United States	Succeeded by Brad Henry as Former Governor
