= Oscar B. Jackson Jr. =

American civil servant

Oklahoma Secretary of Human Resources and Administration
- In office 1991–2012
- Governor: David Walters; Frank Keating; Brad Henry; Mary Fallin
- Succeeded by: None; position abolished

Administrator of the Oklahoma Office of Personnel Management
- In office 1991–2011
- Governor: David Walters; Frank Keating; Brad Henry; Mary Fallin
- Succeeded by: None; position abolished

Personal details
- Born: July 9, 1947 (age 79)
- Education: University of Oklahoma
- Occupation: Civil Servant
- Website: Oklahoma Office of Personnel Management

Oscar B. Jackson Jr. (born July 9, 1947) is an American civil servant from the state of Oklahoma. Jackson was the last Oklahoma Secretary of Human Resources and Administration, having served in that position from when he was appointed by Governor of Oklahoma David Walters in 1991 until the office was abolished in 2012. With over twenty years of continuous service, Jackson is the longest serving Cabinet Secretary in State history.

Jackson served under three different Governors spanning both political parties: Democrat David Walters, Republican Frank Keating, Democrat Brad Henry, and Republican GovernorMary Fallin.

In addition to his service as Human Resources and Administration Secretary, Jackson served concurrently as the Administrator of the Oklahoma Office of Personnel Management until that position was abolished in 2011.

== Biography ==
Jackson has a bachelor's degree in Business Education from the University of Oklahoma, and has completed graduate work in Public Administration, with an emphasis in public personnel administration. In 2005, he was selected as an inaugural member of the University of Oklahoma College of Education Alumni Hall of Fame.

== Secretary of Human Resources and Administration ==
In 1991, Jackson was appointed Secretary of Human Resources by Democratic Governor of Oklahoma David Walters. Jackson has since remained in that position under two more administrations: Frank Keating (1995–2003) and Brad Henry (2003 – 2011). At the same time, Jackson was appointed by Governor Walters to serve as the Administrator of the Oklahoma Office of Personnel Management, having him direct control over that Office. Both Keating and Henry retained Jackson in that position as well.

Jackson was one of three Cabinet Secretaries appointed by former Governor Frank Keating to be held over by Governor Brad Henry, the others being: Health and Human Services Secretary Howard Hendrick and Veterans Affairs Secretary Norman Lamb.

As the Secretary, Jackson was charged with providing comprehensive administrative and human resource services to all state agencies and employees, such as overseeing all purchasing, the state motor fleet, state building construction and maintenance, and state employee salaries, benefits and employment securities. He had supervision over the Oklahoma Office of Personnel Management.

On November 22, 2010, Governor-elect Mary Fallin announced that she would retain Secretary Jackson in both of his positions as Cabinet Secretary and as OPM Administrator. He would continue to serve in that capacity until his position was dissolved in 2012.

Political offices
Preceded by	Oklahoma Secretary of Human Resources and Administration; Under Governors David Walters, Frank Keating, Brad Henry and Mary Fallin; 1991–present	Incumbent
Preceded by	Administrator of the Oklahoma Office of Personnel Management; Under Governors David Walters, Frank Keating, Brad Henry and Mary Fallin; 1991–present	Incumbent
