= Joseph W. Alexander =

American educator

Oklahoma Secretary of Science and Technology
- In office January 23, 2004 – 2011
- Governor: Brad Henry
- Preceded by: W. Arthur Porter
- Succeeded by: Stephen W. S. McKeever

Personal details
- Education: University of Arizona; Colorado State University; University of Tennessee
- Occupation: Educator
- Website: Oklahoma State University

Dr. Joseph W. Alexander, DVM, (1947) is an American educator from the U.S. state of Oklahoma. He served as the Oklahoma Secretary of Science and Technology under Governor of Oklahoma Brad Henry, having been appointed by Henry in 2004 and leaving the post in 2011.

In addition to his service to Governor Henry, Alexander is also the President of the Oklahoma State University's Center for Innovation and Economic Development.

== Early life ==
Alexander earned by bachelor's degree in animal science from the University of Arizona, a doctors degree in veterinary science from Colorado State University, and a master's degree in educational administration and supervision from the University of Tennessee. After finishing his education, Alexander moved to Oklahoma where he became a professor of veterinary medicine at Oklahoma State University (OSU). In 1985, Alexander was promoted as the Dean of the College of Veterinary Medicine for OSU. He would remain in that position for the next sixteen years.

In 2001, Alexander was selected as the Interim Vice-president for Research and External Relations for OSU. He served in that capacity until 2003 when he was appointed to the dual position of Director of External and Legislative Affairs and President of the Center for Innovation and Economic Development.

== Secretary of Science ==
Following the election of Democrat Brad Henry in the 2002 Oklahoma gubernatorial election, Alexander served as a member of Henry's transition team.

In 2004, Governor Henry appointed Alexander as his Secretary of Science and Technology. As the Secretary, Alexander oversees all efforts by the State government to use science and technology to improve government and to better serve the citizens of Oklahoma. In particular, Alexander works with the Secretary of Commerce and Tourism to promote economic development throughout the State. As Secretary, Alexander has primary supervision over the Oklahoma Center for the Advancement of Science and Technology.

Political offices
Preceded by W. Arthur Porter	Oklahoma Secretary of Science and Technology; January 23, 2004 - January 10, 2011	Succeeded by Stephen W. S. McKeever
