= Jim Halligan =

American university president and politician (1936–2022)

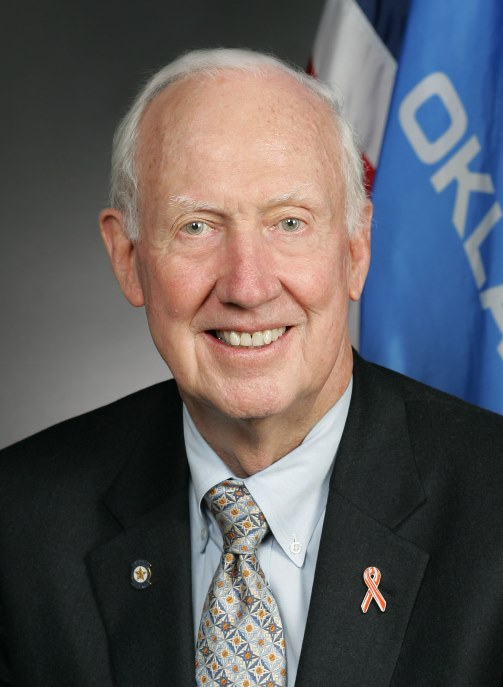

Member of the Oklahoma Senate from the 21st district
- In office November 19, 2008 – November 22, 2016
- Preceded by: Mike Morgan
- Succeeded by: Tom Dugger

16th President of Oklahoma State University
- In office 1994–2002
- Preceded by: Ray M. Bowen (Interim)
- Succeeded by: David J. Schmidly

Personal details
- Born: James Edmund Halligan; June 23, 1936 Moorland, Iowa, U.S.
- Died: October 25, 2022 (aged 86) Oklahoma City, Oklahoma, U.S.
- Party: Republican
- Spouse: Ann Halligan
- Website: Senate website

James Edmund Halligan (June 23, 1936 – October 25, 2022) was an American state senator from Oklahoma and Oklahoma State University president. Halligan defeated Robert "Bob" Murphy in 2008, gaining a Republican seat in the state senate and helping to deliver his party control for the first time in state history.

== Early life ==
Halligan was born in Moorland, Iowa, on June 23, 1936. He joined the US Air Force and served for four years as a Bulgarian translator. He then studied chemical engineering at Iowa State University, obtaining his undergraduate, master's, and Doctor of Philosophy degrees from that institution.

== Academic career ==
After being awarded his doctorate, Halligan was briefly employed in the petroleum industry. He subsequently taught as a faculty member, and served as department chair and dean of engineering at the University of Arkansas, Texas Tech University, and New Mexico State University (NMSU). He was appointed president of NMSU in 1984 and served in that capacity for a decade before becoming the sixteenth president of Oklahoma State University (OSU) on August 1, 1994.

During his tenure at OSU, Halligan emphasized increasing retention and graduation rates, halting a 12-year trend of decreasing student enrollments. He also encouraged the development of national scholars, and investing more than $200 million in student facilities on campus, including multi-media classrooms and suite-style student accommodation. Halligan oversaw the university's first capital campaign that ultimately raised more than $260 million, which was over twice the initial goal. He also contributed towards "Raise the Roof" for Gallagher-Iba Arena, which was named by CBS Sportsline as the country's best college basketball venue in 2001. OSU was recognized as "America's Best College Buy" and a "Truman Honor Institution" under his leadership.

Throughout his presidency, Halligan and his wife hosted thousands of OSU students in their home every year. They also promoted events run by students such as Orange Peel, Homecoming, Varsity Review and Into the Streets. They were credited with steering the university through the aftermath of the plane crash in January 2001 that killed ten members of the Oklahoma State Cowboys basketball team and their flight crew. He announced his retirement in May 2002.

== Political career ==
Halligan ran for state senator in Oklahoma's 21st district (encompassing Stillwater) and was elected. He served two terms in that capacity and was a member of various committees, including appropriations, education, energy, business and commerce, finance, and rules. During his time in the Oklahoma Senate, Halligan voted in favor of an independent audit of the state department of education, and against the repeal of the state grocery sales tax. He also authored a bill passed in February 2015 that banned the use of tobacco on campuses. On August 12, 2015, Halligan released a statement through the Oklahoma State Senate announcing that he would not seek reelection to a third term and that the 2016 legislative session would be his last.

== Personal life ==
Halligan was married to Ann until his death. Together, they had three children: Mike, Pat and Chris. After retiring from Oklahoma State, he resided in Stillwater.

Halligan died on the morning of October 25, 2022, at Integris Hospital in Oklahoma City. He was 86 years old.

== Election history ==
November 4, 2007, election results for Oklahoma State Senator for District 21
Candidates	Party	Votes	%
Jim Halligan	Republican Party	17,711	58.15%
Bob Murphy	Democratic Party	12,749	41.85%

== See also ==
- Oklahoma State Senate
- Oklahoma Republican Party
- Politics of Oklahoma
