= W. Arthur Porter =

American teacher and businessman

Oklahoma Secretary of Science and Technology
- In office 1999–2003
- Governor: Frank Keating
- Preceded by: Position created
- Succeeded by: Joseph W. Alexander

Personal details
- Born: 1941 (age 84–85) Irving, Texas
- Education: University of North Texas; Texas A&M University
- Occupation: Teacher, businessman

W. Arthur "Skip" Porter (born 1941) is an American teacher and businessman from Texas. He previously served as the Oklahoma Secretary of Science and Technology under Governor of Oklahoma Frank Keating, having serving in that position from 1999 to 2003.

== Biography ==
Porter earned his bachelor and master of science degrees in physics from the University of North Texas and his PhD in interdisciplinary engineering from Texas A&M University. Upon graduating, he joined the staff of Rice University as an adjunct professor of electrical engineering. In 1993, Porter became the president and chief executive officer of the Houston Advanced Research Center, a non-profit environmental research institution. He would serve in that position for five years.

Porter joined the staff of the University of Oklahoma in 1998. At OU, Porter would serve as the University Vice President for Technology Development and as Dean of the OU College of Engineering. He would serve as Engineering Dean until 2005 and as vice president until 2006 with his retirement. Upon his retirement, he was named Professor Emeritus with OU.

== Keating Administration ==
Governor of Oklahoma Frank Keating created the position of Oklahoma Secretary of Science and Technology and appointed Porter to serve as the first person to hold that office. As the Secretary, Porter oversaw all efforts by the State government to use science and technology to improve government and to better serve the citizens of Oklahoma. Porter worked with Oklahoma Secretary of Commerce Ron Rosenfeld to promote economic development throughout the State. As Secretary, Porter was responsible for overseeing the Oklahoma Center for the Advancement of Science and Technology. Porter served as Secretary until the end of Keating's term in 2003.

Political offices
Preceded by Position Created	Oklahoma Secretary of Science and Technology; Under Governor Frank Keating; 1999–2003	Succeeded by Joseph W. Alexander
