= List of presidents of Oklahoma State University =

The following persons have served as president of Oklahoma State University or its predecessors:

No.	Image	Name	Term start	Term end	Ref.
Oklahoma Agricultural and Mechanical College (1890–1957)
1		Robert Barker	1891	1894	
2		Henry E. Alvord	1894	1895 (Note: Resigned to lead the dairy division in the U.S. Department of Agriculture.)	
3		Edmund D. Murdaugh	January 1895	June 1895	
4		George E. Morrow	1895	1899	
5		Angelo C. Scott	1899	1908	
6		John H. Connell	1908	1914	
7		James W. Cantwell	1915	1921	
8		James B. Eskridge	1921	1923	
9		George Wilson	June 1923	July 1923	
10		Bradford Knapp	1923	1928	
11		Henry G. Bennett	1928	December 22, 1951 (Note: Died in office)	
Oklahoma State University of Agricultural and Applied Sciences (1957–1980)
12		Oliver S. Willham	1952	June 30, 1966	
13		Robert B. Kamm	July 1, 1966	January 31, 1977	
interim		James H. Boggs and Richard W. Poole	February 1, 1977	June 14, 1977	
Oklahoma State University (1980–present)
14		Lawrence L. Boger	June 15, 1977	June 30, 1988	
15		John R. Campbell	July 1, 1988	September 14, 1993 (Note: Resigned under pressure.)	
interim		Ray M. Bowen	September 15, 1993	July 31, 1994	
16		James E. Halligan	August 1, 1994	January 15, 2003	
17		David J. Schmidly	January 16, 2003	February 28, 2007 (Note: Resigned to lead the University of New Mexico.)	
interim		Marlene Strathe	March 1, 2007	March 9, 2008	
18		Burns Hargis	March 10, 2008	June 30, 2021	
19		Kayse Shrum	July 1, 2021	February 3, 2025	
interim		Jim Hess	February 7, 2025	April 25, 2025	
20		Jim Hess	April 25, 2025	present	

Table notes:
