= Marlene Strathe =

Marlene Strathe was the Provost at Oklahoma State University, Oklahoma, United States until July 2010. She served as interim president of the university in 2007 before president V. Burns Hargis was elected. She formerly served as the Provost and Vice President for Academic Affairs at the University of Northern Colorado where she was also a professor of Applied Statistics and Research Methodology.

Academic offices
Preceded by David J. Schmidly	Interim President of Oklahoma State University; 2007	Succeeded by V. Burns Hargis
