= Kei Koizumi (science policymaker) =

American science policy advisor

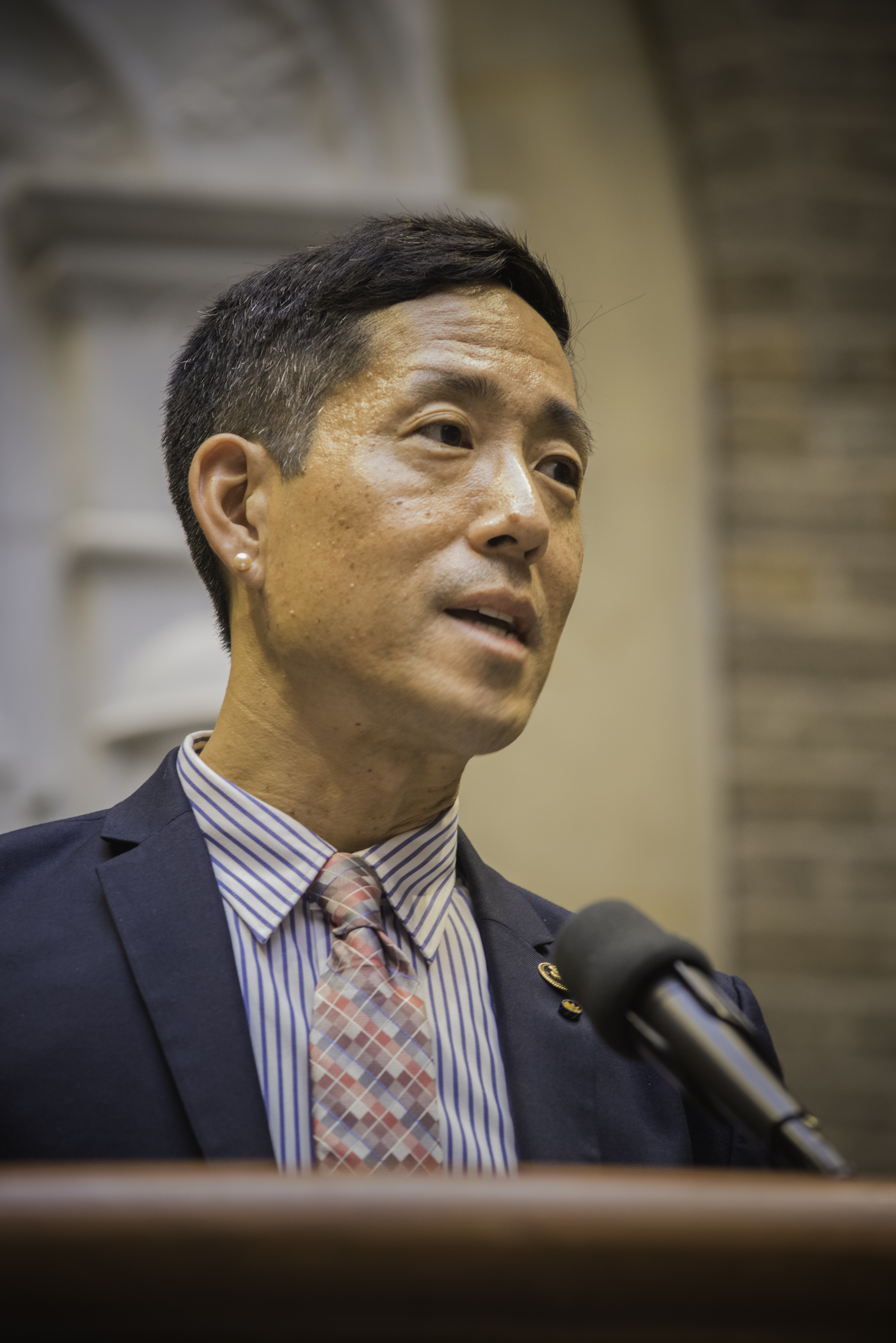

Director of the Office of Science and Technology Policy
- Acting
- In office January 20, 2021 – June 2, 2021
- President: Joe Biden
- Preceded by: Kelvin Droegemeier
- Succeeded by: Eric Lander

Personal details
- Born: Providence, Rhode Island, U.S.
- Education: Boston University (BA); George Washington University (MA)

Kei Koizumi is an American science and technology policy advisor who served as Chief of Staff in the White House Office of Science and Technology Policy (OSTP) during the Biden administration. Earlier in the Biden administration, he served as Principal Deputy Director for Policy, Chief of Staff, and Acting Director.

Prior to that, he held various roles, including senior advisor on science policy for the American Association for the Advancement of Science (AAAS), senior advisor to the National Science and Technology Council, and Assistant Director for Federal R&D at OSTP under President Obama.

== Early life and education ==
Koizumi was born in Providence, Rhode Island, and raised in Columbus, Ohio. He attended Boston University, where he received his Bachelor of Arts degree in comparative political economy. He then earned a Master of Arts degree in international science and technology policy from George Washington University, where he studied at the Center (now Institute) for International Science, Technology, and Public Policy program.

== Career ==
Koizumi began his career in science policy at the AAAS, where he specialized in analysis of the federal budget around scientific research and development. In this capacity, he advocated that government agencies clearly communicate the value of their programs and how they relate to federal priorities. During the Obama–Biden presidential transition, he worked on the Technology, Innovation & Government Reform Policy Working Group. Following the transition, he served as the Assistant Director for Federal Research and Development (R&D) in the OSTP and a senior advisor to the National Science and Technology Council. In this role, he also worked within the White House to advocate for the LGBT community and the Asian American and Pacific Islander (AAPI) community in both the federal government and in science. In recognition of this work, he was awarded the Walt Westman Award by Out to Innovate, which honors LGBTQ+ role models in STEM.

Following the Obama administration, Koizumi returned to AAAS as a visiting scholar.

He continued analyzing federal research and development budgets under the Trump administration, expressing concerns around flat or decreasing investments in science, particularly around addressing climate change and environmental protections.

In the winter of 2020, Koizumi worked on the Biden–Harris presidential transition, leading the National Science Foundation Agency Review team and as a member of the OSTP Agency Review Team.

On January 15, 2021, Koizumi was announced as the chief of staff for the Office of Science and Technology Policy. During the Biden Administration, he took on several roles, beginning as Chief of Staff, and ending as Principal Deputy Director for Science, Society, and Policy.

== Personal life ==
Koizumi is a competitive athlete, winning a gold medal in the 40 to 44 age group for the 110-meter hurdles at the 2010 Gay Games in Cologne.

Political offices
Preceded by Kelvin Droegemeier	Director of the Office of Science and Technology Policy; Acting; 2021	Succeeded by Eric Lander
