= David J. Schmidly =

American academic

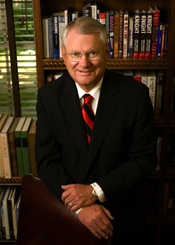

20th President of the University of New Mexico
- In office 2007–2012
- Preceded by: David W. Harris
- Succeeded by: Robert G. Frank

17th President of Oklahoma State University
- In office 2003–2007
- Preceded by: Jim Halligan
- Succeeded by: V. Burns Hargis

13th President of Texas Tech University
- In office 2000–2003
- Preceded by: Donald R. Haragan
- Succeeded by: Jon Whitmore

Personal details
- Born: December 20, 1943 (age 82)
- Spouse: Janet Schmidly
- Children: 2
- Education: Texas Tech University (BS, MS); University of Illinois (Ph.D.)

David James Schmidly (born December 20, 1943) is an American academic administrator and zoologist who was president of Texas Tech University, Oklahoma State University, and the University of New Mexico. On April 22, 2011, Schmidly announced his decision to retire as UNM's President at the end of his five-year contract in 2012, citing health concerns and his desire to end his career working in his academic field of natural history and mammalogy.

Previously, Schmidly was chief executive officer and 17th president of the Oklahoma State University System (2003–2007). Before coming to OSU, he was the President of Texas Tech University (2000-2003), where he also was Vice President for Research and Dean of the graduate school. His administrative career began at Texas A&M University where he was head of the Department of Wildlife and Fisheries Sciences (1986-1992) and campus dean and chief executive officer of Texas A&M at Galveston (1992-1996).

A native of Levelland, Texas and an accomplished zoologist, he earned his B.S. and M.S. in zoology at Texas Tech University, where he was a member of the Sigma Nu fraternity, and his Ph.D. in zoology from the University of Illinois. He has been inducted into the Texas Hall of Fame for Science, Mathematics and Technology and has had two species of mice named for him: Peromyscus schmidlyi and Habromys schmidlyi. Schmidly was elected as an Honorary Member of the American Society of Mammalogists in 2003 and the Mexican Society of Mammalogists in 2010. In 2012 he was named Distinguished Alumnus of Texas Tech University and the College of Liberal Arts and Sciences at the University of Illinois.

== Accomplishments and Controversies ==
During his tenure as president of Texas Tech, enrollment grew by double digits and research funding more than doubled. The geographic reach of the university was increased with the opening of academic learning and outreach centers in Fredericksburg, Marble Falls, Amarillo, and Abilene, Texas. Also, Gateway partnerships were established with more than 20 community colleges which helped to diversify and grow the student body. During his tenure, the College of Visual and Performing Arts was opened and the first endowed college (Rawls College of Business Administration) was established with an endowment gift of $25 M, at that time the largest gift to the university.

During his tenure at Oklahoma State enrollment grew and the ACT average for the freshman class reached its highest level at that time. More than $800 M in facilities were built including 60% for academic, student service, and infrastructure projects. He also received special recognition from the OSU African American Association for “Exceptional Leadership and Commitment to Diversity on the OSU campus.” He was criticized while at OSU for his decision to use eminent domain to raze a low-income neighborhood in Stillwater to build a new athletic village using a gift of $165 million from Boone Pickens. For some in the OSU community, the emphasis that Schmidly placed on athletics far outweighed his concern about academics. The Oklahoma State University Faculty Senate called for Schmidly's resignation over the size of severance packages offered to former staffers from Texas Tech that Schmidly had hired at OSU.

During his tenure at the University of New Mexico, enrollment and research funding grew for the first time in decades and the newly reorganized UNM foundation initiated a $675 M comprehensive campaign, the largest in the institution’s history, and gift activity increased by 55%. He also developed a strategic budget model and cost containment program that accommodated a $64 M reduction in state funding (20%), accomplished without layoffs or mandatory furloughs. In 2008, shortly after becoming president, Schmidly received the Distinguished Leadership Award from the New Mexico Anti-Defamation League. During his tenure, the university built more than $500 M of academic, student service, and athletic facilities, the largest amount in the history of the university to that point.

One of Schmidly's first acts as president of the University of New Mexico was to halt an official investigation into complaints of a hostile learning environment in the University's English Department. The investigation involved Associate Professor Lisa D. Chavez, who had been moonlighting as a phone sex worker on various bondage and sadomasochism websites with current and former graduate students. According to the Chronicle of Higher Education, Schmidly authorized the use of an outside attorney, who was tasked with investigating Chavez's complaints against faculty members she accused of discrimination and slander. The outside attorney and internal legal counsel both concurred that Chavez had not violated university policy and her actions were within the rights of academic freedom.

At UNM, accusations of cronyism arose within the first 18 months, when he hired long-time friend, John Stropp, a senior executive at the Texas A&M Foundation, with a compensation package of $325,000. According to the Albuquerque Journal, Schmidly acknowledged he has known Stropp for years but said he was not hired because of their friendship, saying "This is not a crony hire."

Later that year, on October 16, 2008, the "Albuquerque Journal" reported that UNM had hired Schmidly's son, Brian Schmidly, into a newly created position of Associate Director of Sustainability. Before the son occupied the position, he turned it down due to outcry from the faculty. The hiring officer for the position maintained that Schmidly’s son was the best qualified for the position and that Schmidly made no attempt to influence the hire.

On February 7, 2009, the "Albuquerque Journal" reported that the UNM faculty voted 329 to 106 in favor of no confidence in Schmidly, with 52 faculty abstaining. In response, Schmidly led a year-long study of shared governance at UNM and filed a monitoring report with the Higher Learning Commission (HLC) that received high praise.

In January 2011 KOAT television reported on a lawsuit challenging UNM's awarding of a construction contract for renovation of the PIT basketball arena to out of state contractor Flintco. Schmidly's son Brian was employed by Flintco sometime after the contract was secured.

Also at UNM, on October 25, 2011, Schmidly denied the renewal of a permit for (un)Occupy Albuquerque, a protest movement in solidarity with Occupy Wall Street, which had been encamped at Yale Park since October 1. The protesters were subsequently forced out of the park by UNM Police, the Albuquerque Police Department, and New Mexico State Police during the night of October 25, resulting in dozens of arrests as some protesters refused to leave, citing their First Amendment right to "peaceably assemble". Other arrests were made as hundreds of protesters were forced into Central Avenue, which bounds Yale Park on the south. UNM students were among the arrested individuals. At least one UNM student left the University in response to Schmidly's action, citing the denial of First Amendment rights, and several other students, including Sebastian Pais, engaged in a hunger strike to demand that Schmidly allow the protesters to return. Schmidly has also been criticized for closing Yale Park to the public, and ordering UNM police to arrest any protesters or students who violated the closure. Relenting to pressure from supporters on campus and in the community, including multiple UNM faculty members, on October 26, Schmidly's office issued a new, modified permit which will allow the protesters to return to Yale Park during strictly defined periods.

After retiring from the presidency at UNM, Schmidly returned to the faculty to teach in his field, and he published several books and articles before fully retiring in 2016. Today, as a retired Professor Emeritus both at Texas Tech University and the University of New Mexico, he continues his publishing and research in his chosen field of mammalogy.

== Selected publications ==
- The Mammals of Trans-Pecos Texas (1977). Texas A & M University Press. College Station, Texas. 225 pp. ISBN 978-0890960356
- Texas Mammals East of the Balcones Fault Zone (1983). Texas A & M University Press. College Station, Texas. 400 pp. ISBN 978-0890961582
- The Bats of Texas (1991). Texas A & M University Press. College Station, Texas. 188 pp. ISBN 0-89096-450-5
- The Mammals of Texas, 6th ed (1994). University of Texas Press, Austin. xviii, 501 pp. ISBN 0-292-70241-8
- Texas Natural History: A Century of Change (2002). Texas Tech University Press. Lubbock, Texas. xi, 534 pp. ISBN 0-89672-469-7
- Texas Natural History in the 21st Century (2022). With Robert D. Bradley, and Lisa C. Bradley. Texas Tech University Press. Lubbock, Texas. 744 pp. ISBN 978-1682830703

Preceded by David W. Harris	President of University of New Mexico; 2007 – 2012	Succeeded by Robert G. Frank
Preceded by James Halligan	President of Oklahoma State University; 2002 – 2007	Succeeded by Marlene Strathe
Preceded by Donald Haragan	President of Texas Tech University; 2000 – 2002	Succeeded by Jon S. Whitmore
