= Ray M. Bowen =

American academic

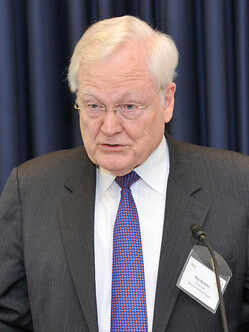
- Bowen in 2012

21st President of Texas A&M University
- In office June 1, 1994 – July 31, 2002
- Preceded by: E. Dean Gage (Acting)
- Succeeded by: Robert M. Gates

Interim President of Oklahoma State University
- In office 1993–1994
- Preceded by: John R. Campbell
- Succeeded by: James E. Halligan

Dean of the University of Kentucky College of Engineering
- In office 1983–1989

Personal details
- Born: Raymond Morris Bowen; March 30, 1936 (age 90) Fort Worth, Texas, U.S.
- Spouse: Sally Elizabeth Gibbons (m. 1958)
- Children: 2
- Education: Texas A&M University (BS, PhD); California Institute of Technology (MS)

Raymond Morris Bowen (born March 30, 1936) is an American academic. He served as the 21st president of Texas A&M University from 1994 until 2002. He served as Interim President of Oklahoma State University (OSU) from 1993 until 1994, and Provost and VP for Academic Affairs at OSU from 1991 until 1993. He was Dean of Engineering at the University of Kentucky from 1983 until 1989. At The University of Kentucky, he also served as Director of the Center for Robotics and Manufacturing Systems and Director of the Center for Applied Energy Research. Bowen was Chair of Mechanical Engineering at Rice University from 1972 until 1977.

== Early life and education ==
Raymond Morris Bowen was born March 30, 1936, in Fort Worth, Texas. Bowen earned his B.S. in mechanical engineering at Texas A&M University in 1958. After receiving his M.S. at the California Institute of Technology in 1959, he returned to Texas A&M for his Ph.D. in mechanical engineering, which he received in 1961.

== Career ==
He served three years on the faculty of the Air Force Institute of Technology while on active duty in the U.S. Air Force. His time on active duty was followed by a one-year post doctoral fellowship in Mechanics at the Johns Hopkins University. After serving a brief period on the faculty of Louisiana State University, Bowen joined the Mechanical Engineering Department and the Mathematical Sciences Department at Rice University in 1967 and worked there until 1983. During his last year at Rice, he served in a rotator position at the National Science Foundation (NSF) as the Division Director of Mechanical Engineering and Applied Mechanics. In 1990, he received another assignment at NSF as Deputy Assistant Director for Engineering. During this time, he also served at NSF as Acting Assistant Director of Engineering. In 2002, Bowen was nominated by the President and confirmed by the Senate for a six-year term on the National Science Board. He was nominated and confirmed for a second six-year term in 2008. During this second appointment, he served for two years as Chair of the National Science Board.

During Bowen's time as President of Texas A&M, the university was admitted to the Association of American Universities. Shortly after he completed his presidency, Texas A&M was awarded a Phi Beta Kappa chapter. He expanded and enhanced numerous academic programs, and successfully completed a major capital campaign. Bowen was instrumental in the creation of Vision 2020, an effort to propel the institution into the ranks of the country's top 10 public universities by the year 2020. He now holds the title of President Emeritus of Texas A&M University.

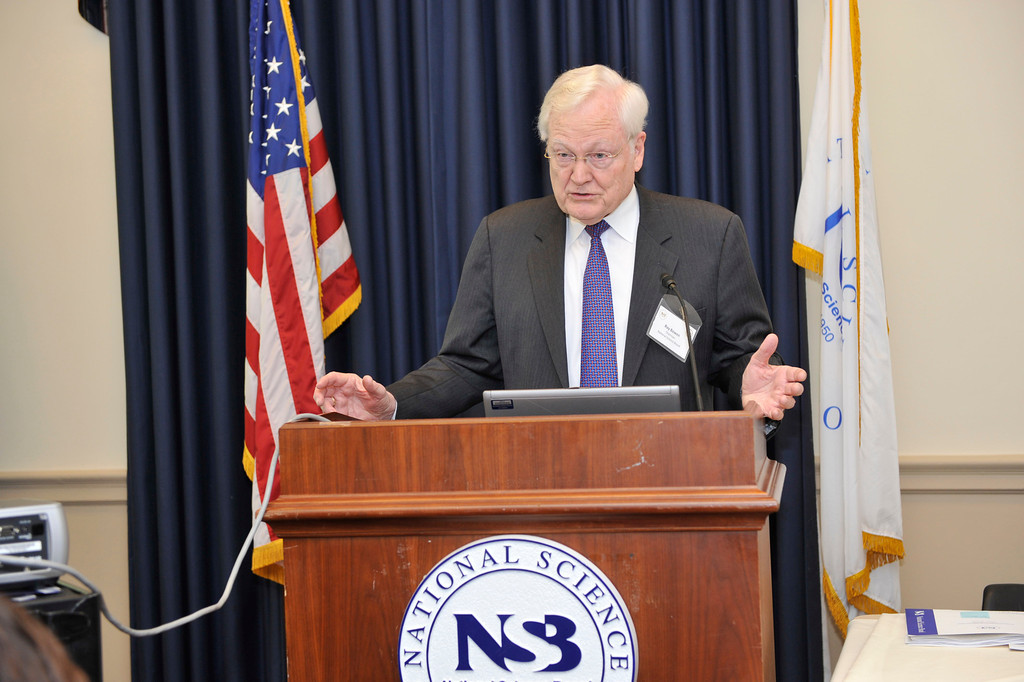
Ray M. Bowen in 2012

After completing his service as President of Texas A&M, Bowen returned to the classroom where he taught mechanical engineering and mathematics until his retirement in 2010. At that time, he was appointed Professor Emeritus of Mechanical Engineering. For the next four years, he served as a Visiting Distinguished Professor of Mechanical Engineering at Rice University. During his active scholarly career, Bowen's research was in the broad field of nonlinear continuum mechanics. His specialty was the non-equilibrium thermodynamics associated with the theory of mixtures. In addition, he authored or co-authored three textbooks on applied mathematics.

== Honors ==
- Society of Scholars, Johns Hopkins University
- Fellow and Honorary Member of the American Society of Mechanical Engineers
- Fellow of the American Association for the Advancement of Science
- Fellow of the American Society for Engineering Education
- Outstanding Alumni Award, Department of Mechanical Engineering, Texas A&M University
- Distinguished Alumni Award, Texas A&M University
- Corps Hall of Honor, Texas A&M University

== Personal life ==
Bowen married Sally Elizabeth Gibbons Bowen in 1958. They have two children and six grandchildren.
