= V. Burns Hargis =

American university president

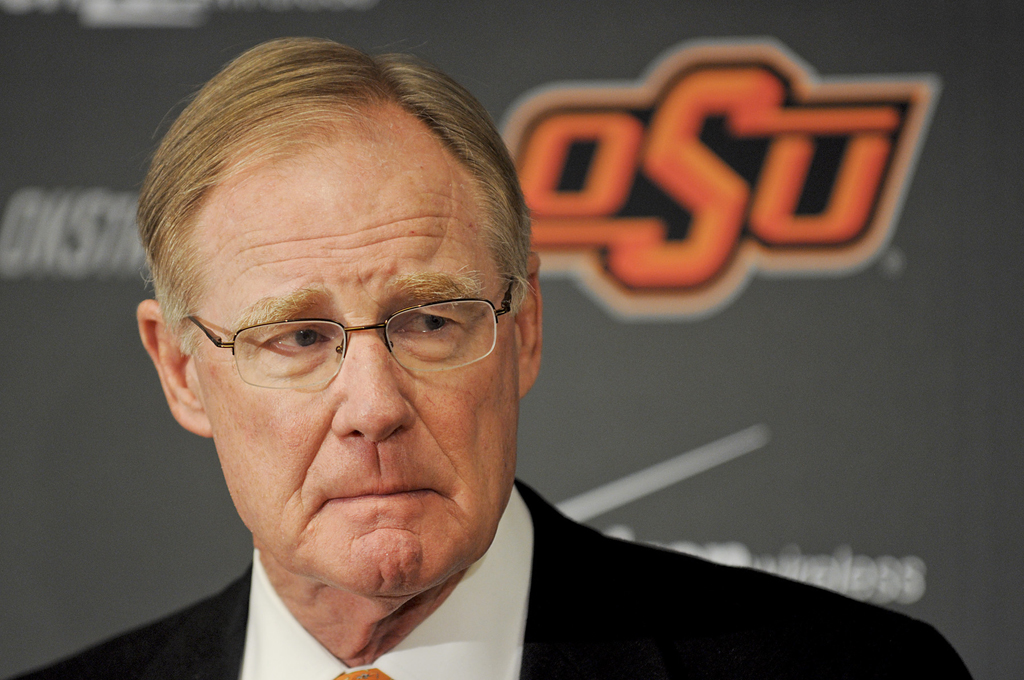
- Hargis in 2011

18th President of Oklahoma State University
- In office March 10, 2008 – July 1, 2021
- Preceded by: David J. Schmidly
- Succeeded by: Kayse Shrum

Personal details
- Born: Vaden Burns Hargis; October 29, 1945 (age 80)
- Education: Oklahoma State University (BA); University of Oklahoma (JD)
- Profession: Attorney

Vaden Burns Hargis (born October 29, 1945) is an American attorney who served as the 18th president of Oklahoma State University. He took office March 10, 2008, and retired July 1, 2021. He succeeded David Schmidly, who had resigned from OSU to become president of the University of New Mexico. (Note: Marlene Strathe, then provost of OSU, served as Interim President briefly in 2007, between the departure of Schmidly and the arrival of Hargis.) Hargis holds degrees in accounting from Oklahoma State University and in law from University of Oklahoma. (Note: Hargis is the second OSU graduate to lead the university as president. The first alumnus to serve as the school president was Oliver S. Wilham, a 1923 graduate who was president from 1952 to 1956.)

== Career in law and banking ==
Before he came to OSU, he was the Vice Chairman of Bank of Oklahoma, N.A. Before 1997, when he joined Bank of Oklahoma, Hargis practiced law in Oklahoma City for 28 years, where he had worked with the firm of McAfee & Taft. He was a president of the Oklahoma County Bar Association, former president of the Oklahoma Bar Foundation, and is a Fellow of the American Bar Foundation. Hargis was also candidate for the Republican nomination for Governor of Oklahoma in 1990.

Other activities have included his service as vice-chairman of the Oklahoma State Election Board, member of the Oklahoma Constitutional Revision Commission and as Chairman of the Oklahoma Commission for Human Services. He is a former member of the Commission of the North Central Association of Colleges and Schools.

== Job qualifications ==
While some people criticized his appointment to the OSU presidency because Hargis had no experience in the actual work of teaching, he had previously been involved with other activities pertaining to education. For example, he was the first chairperson of the Oklahoma Creativity Project, and was a member of the Board of Regents for the Oklahoma Agricultural and Mechanical Colleges of Oklahoma State University.

OSU faculty council chairman, Bob Miller, questioned Hargis about lacking, "...in the trenches teaching experience," Hargis responded by telling the group that his assets included "political finesse, fundraising and broad visioning."

The most prominent example of Hargis' fundraising capabilities is "Branding Success: The Campaign for OSU." This campaign set a target of $1.2 billion in donations, primarily from OSU friends and alumni. It reached its goal ahead of schedule. According to the school, it has led to the creation of more than a thousand new scholarships and 135 new endowed faculty positions.

In 2009, Hargis was inducted into the Oklahoma Hall of Fame.

== Compensation ==
In 2017, Fox News reported that Hargis' salary at OSU is "more than $434,000." By comparison, OU's president David Boren received $449,000.

== Awards ==
In March 2020, The Journal Records announced that Hargis has been selected as this year's recipient of the Legacy Award. The award will be presented on April 27 at The Journal Records 11th annual Oklahoma's Most Admired CEO & Financial Stewardship Awards event.

== Notes ==
Academic offices
Preceded by David Schmidly	President of Oklahoma State University; 2008–2021	Succeeded by Dr. Kayse Shrum
