= Oklahoma Secretary of Science and Technology =

- Incumbent; Kayse Shrum (nominated)
- Oklahoma Center for the Advancement of Science and Technology
- Formation: September 4, 1998
- Website: Office of the Secretary of Science and Technology

The Oklahoma Secretary of Science and Technology is a member of the Oklahoma Governor's Cabinet. The Secretary is appointed by the Governor, with the consent of the Oklahoma Senate, to serve at the pleasure of the Governor. The Secretary serves as the chief advisor to the Governor on the impact of science and technology on the State's economic development.

== History ==
The position of Secretary of Science and Technology was established in 1999 when Governor Frank Keating issued an executive order establishing the position. Previously, the Oklahoma Secretary of Commerce had served the role of chief science officer of the State since 1986 when that position was established by the Executive Branch Reform Act of 1986.

== Responsibilities ==
The Secretary of Science and Technology is responsible for ensuring that scientific research and development conducted by universities in the State coordinates with and enhances the State's business community. As of fiscal year 2011, the Secretary oversees 26 full-time employees and is responsible for an annual budget of $38 million.

Oklahoma state law allows for Cabinet Secretaries to serve concurrently as the head of a State agency in addition to their duties as a Cabinet Secretary. Historically, the Secretary of Science and Technology has not served in any such dual position.

The Secretary of Science and Technology is responsible for overseeing the Oklahoma Center for the Advancement of Science and Technology.

The Secretary of Science and Technology is one of the few Cabinet Secretary positions whose annual salary is not set by law. As such, it is left to the Governor to determine the Secretary's salary in the annual budget. As of 2010, all Science and Technology Secretaries have served without taking a salary.

== List of secretaries ==
Secretary of Science and Technology (1998–present)

| # | Name | Took office | Left office | Governor served under |
|---|---|---|---|---|
| 1 | W. Arthur Porter | 1998 | 2003 | Frank Keating |
| 2 | Joseph W. Alexander | 2003 | 2011 | Brad Henry |
| 3 | Stephen W. S. McKeever | January 10, 2011 | 2017 | Mary Fallin |
| 4 | Kelvin Droegemeier | March 13, 2017 | January 13, 2019 | Mary Fallin |
| | Kayse Shrum (nominated) | 2019 | | Kevin Stitt |
