= Elizabeth Pollard =

Oklahoma Secretary of Science and Innovation
- In office June 29, 2020 – March 15, 2023
- Governor: Kevin Stitt
- Preceded by: Kayse Shrum
- Succeeded by: Position disestablished

Personal details
- Born: Michigan, U.S.
- Education: Michigan State University (B.S.); Central Michigan University (M.S.)

Elizabeth Hutt Pollard is an American businesswoman and civil servant who served as the Oklahoma Secretary of Science and Innovation in the cabinet of Governor Kevin Stitt from 2020 to 2023.

== Biography ==
Elizabeth Hutt Pollard was born in Michigan and graduated from Michigan State University with a bachelor's degree in chemistry and Central Michigan University with a master's degree in administration. She worked for the company Applied Silver based in California and moved to Oklahoma in 2018. She served as an adviser for the Oklahoma State Department of Health during the COVID-19 pandemic.

Pollard was appointed Oklahoma Secretary of Science and Innovation by Governor Kevin Stitt on June 29, 2020, succeeding Kayse Shrum. She resigned effective March 15, 2023, to accept a position at Oklahoma State University. She joined the Oklahoma State University Research Foundation as the executive director on March 1, 2023. She resigned on February 5, 2025, after the resignation of University President Kayse Shrum, following an internal audit which identified extensive financial irregularities.
