= Kayse Shrum =

19th president of Oklahoma State University

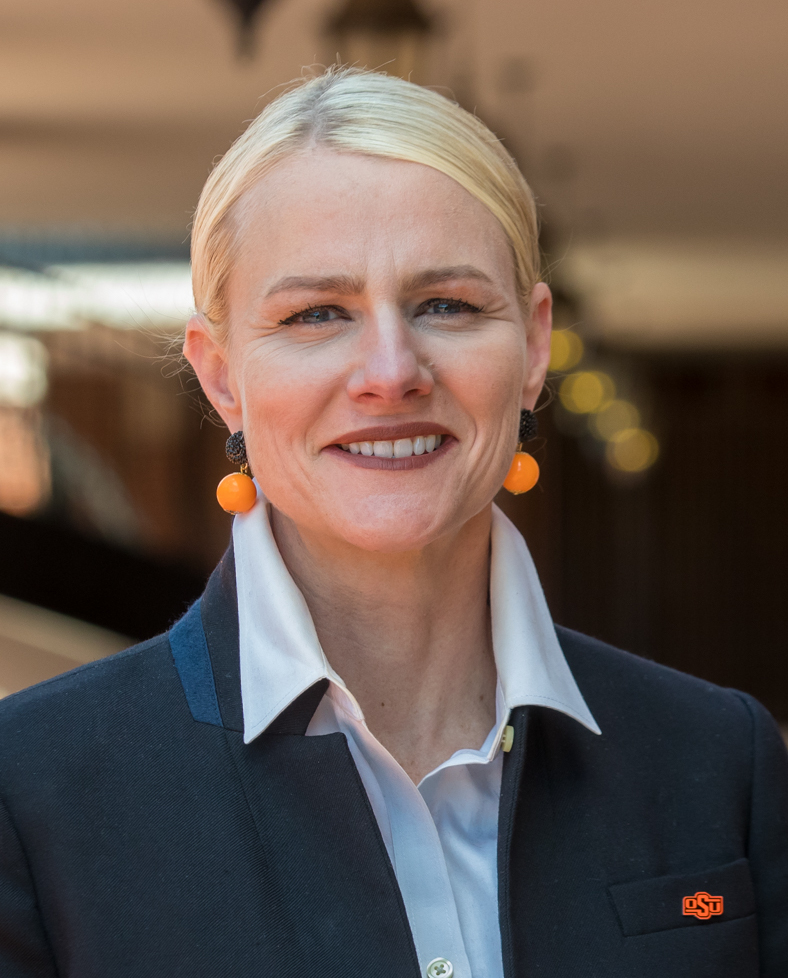
- Shrum in 2021

19th President of Oklahoma State University
- In office July 1, 2021 – February 3, 2025
- Preceded by: V. Burns Hargis
- Succeeded by: Jim Hess

Oklahoma Secretary of Science and Innovation
- In office March 15, 2019 – June 2020
- Governor: Kevin Stitt
- Preceded by: Kelvin Droegemeier
- Succeeded by: Elizabeth Pollard

Personal details
- Born: Kayse Marie Donnelly; October 27, 1972 (age 53) Coweta, Oklahoma, U.S.
- Party: Republican
- Spouse: Darren Shrum (m. 1992)
- Children: 6
- Education: Connors State College (AS); Northeastern State University; University of Arkansas; Oklahoma State University, Tulsa (DO)

Kayse Marie Shrum (/ˈkeɪsi ˈʃrʌm/; née Donnelly; born October 27, 1972) is an American physician who was the 19th President of Oklahoma State University from 2021 to 2025. She was the first woman to lead a public research institution in Oklahoma.

== Early life and education ==
Kayse Marie Donnelly was born on October 27, 1972, in Coweta, Oklahoma. She played softball for Connors State College in Warner, Oklahoma, and graduated in 1992 with an associate of science degree. She continued her education at Northeastern State University and the University of Arkansas before graduating with a doctor of osteopathic medicine degree from the Oklahoma State University College of Osteopathic Medicine.

== Career ==
Shrum practiced pediatrics in Muskogee, Oklahoma before joining the faculty of the medical school faculty at the OSU Center for Health Sciences in 2002. She served as chair of the Department of Pediatrics from 2004 to 2011. In 2011, OSU College of Osteopathic Medicine named her provost of OSU-CHS and dean of the OSU College of Osteopathic Medicine. She was promoted to president of OSU-CHS, becoming the youngest and first female president and dean of a medical school in the state of Oklahoma.

On March 15, 2019, Governor Kevin Stitt appointed her Secretary of Science and Innovation. She resigned in June 2020.

In April 2021 she was named the president of Oklahoma State University and assumed the role on July 1, 2021. Shrum succeeded V. Burns Hargis who announced his retirement plans in October 2020. Shrum resigned as president on February 3, 2025. Vice Provost Jim Hess was officially appointed interim president on February 7, 2025. The following month, an internal audit at the university revealed that $41 million in state funds had been mismanaged.

In July 2025, Shrum assumes the role of chief health strategy officer for the Chickasaw Nation. In this capacity, her initial focus will be on the development of the new Newcastle Medical Center campus.

== Awards ==
Shrum holds the George Kaiser Family Foundation chair in medical excellence and service and the Saint Francis Health System endowed chair of pediatrics. She was inducted into the Connors State College Athletic Hall of Fame in 2013 and the Oklahoma Women's Hall of Fame in 2022.

== Personal life ==
Shrum is married to Darren Shrum, whom she met in 1989 at a Broken Arrow Wal-mart where he was working and undergoing the management training program. They have six children, including three who were adopted from Ethiopia.
