= Pacific Fusion =

American fusion-based energy company

- Type: Private
- Industry: Fusion power
- Founded: 2023; 3 years ago
- Founders: Keith LeChien; Carrie von Muench; Will Regan; Eric Lander; Leland Ellison
- Headquarters: Fremont, California, United States
- Website: pacificfusion.com

Pacific Fusion is an American energy company focused on developing fusion-based power sources, using a pulser-driven approach to high-yield, high-gain inertial fusion. The company uses an advanced pulsed power driver known as the impedance-matched Marx generator (IMG), which was co-invented by Pacific Fusion's chief technology officer, Keith LeChien.

== Background ==
Pacific Fusion was co-founded in 2023 by Will Regan, Keith LeChien, Eric Lander, Carrie von Muench, and Leland Ellison. Pacific Fusion's founding chief executive officer is Eric Lander. The company is pursuing pulser-driven inertial confinement fusion, a process that aims to achieve high-gain fusion by using fast-rising electrical current pulses to electromagnetically compress small containers of deuterium-tritium fuel (e.g., MagLIF).

== History ==
In 2024, Pacific Fusion raised approximately $900 million in Series A funding led by General Catalyst, which included participation from Breakthrough Energy Ventures, Citadel founder Ken Griffin, Stripe co-founder Patrick Collison, venture capitalist John Doerr, and Microsoft’s head of consumer AI business, Mustafa Suleyman. The company’s funding will be provided in stages upon meeting pre-determined milestones. Patrick Collison, General Catalyst partner Hemant Taneja, and former Google chief executive officer Eric Schmidt all joined the company’s board of directors.

In September 2025, Pacific Fusion selected Mesa del Sol in Albuquerque, New Mexico, as the location for its $1 billion research and manufacturing facility. The facility will house the company’s Demonstration System, which has the goal of achieving net facility gain, or generating more fusion energy output from a reaction than the amount of energy required to drive the system. Pacific Fusion partnered with local universities to create training programs specific to its workforce, as its new campus is expected to add 200 permanent jobs and approximately 1,000 construction jobs.

In December 2025, Pacific Fusion's first build center opened in Los Lunas, New Mexico. The site will build the components required for the company's fusion system. Pacific Fusion’s headquarters and its research and development centers remain based in California.

In February 2026, Pacific Fusion announced the results from a series of experiments performed at the Sandia National Laboratories, demonstrating a modified target design that simplifies the company's fusion targets and the maintenance requirements of its fusion system.

In June 2026, Pacific Fusion announced it had achieved its second set of technical milestones related to its fusion system, demonstrating that a scaled module prototype delivered more than 440 GW of peak output power and approximately 1.1 MV peak voltage in ultra-fast pulses, delivering the "performance required to ultimately drive fusion conditions".

In August 2026, the company broke ground on a billion dollar facility in the Mesa del Sol master-planned community of Albuquerque.
