= Eric Lander =

American mathematician (born 1957)

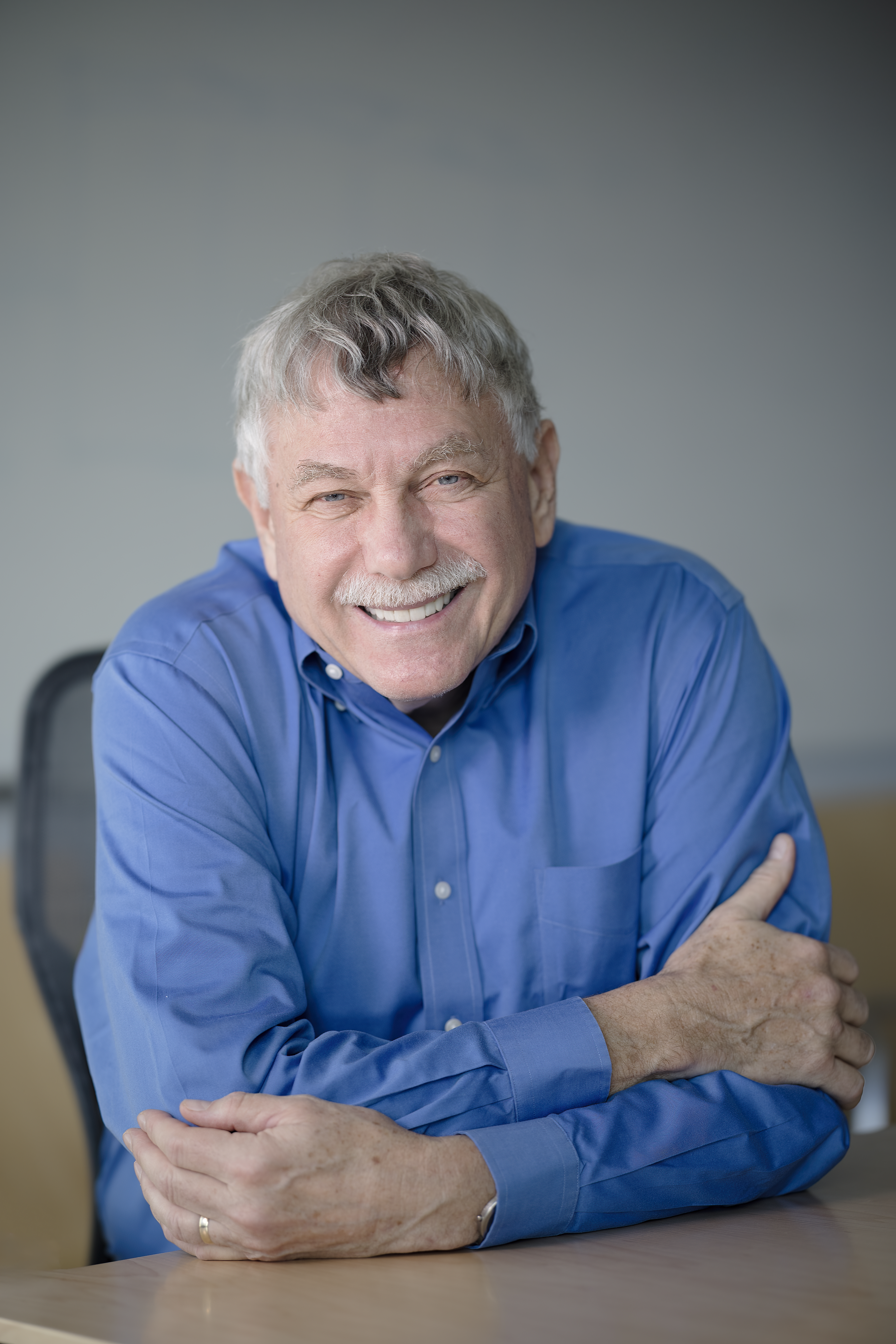
- Lander in 2023

11th Director of the Office of Science and Technology Policy
- In office June 2, 2021 – February 18, 2022
- President: Joe Biden
- Preceded by: Kei Koizumi (acting)
- Succeeded by: Alondra Nelson (acting)

Science Advisor to the President
- In office January 25, 2021 – February 18, 2022
- President: Joe Biden
- Preceded by: Kei Koizumi (acting)
- Succeeded by: Francis Collins (acting)

Personal details
- Born: Eric Steven Lander; February 3, 1957 (age 69) New York City, U.S.
- Party: Democratic
- Spouse: Lori Lander
- Education: Princeton University (BA); Wolfson College, Oxford (MSc, DPhil)
- Awards: MacArthur Fellowship (1987); Dickson Prize (1997); Woodrow Wilson Award for Public Service (1998); Max Delbrück Medal (2001); Gairdner Award (2002); Harvey Prize (2012); Breakthrough Prize in Life Sciences (2013); William Allan Award (2018)
- Website: www.broadinstitute.org/bios/eric-s-lander
- Scientific career
- Workplaces: Broad Institute; Massachusetts Institute of Technology
- Thesis: Topics in Algebraic Coding Theory (1980)
- Doctoral advisor: Peter Cameron
- Doctoral students: Julie Segre; Kenro Kusumi; Manolis Kellis; Erez Lieberman Aiden; Mark Daly

Eric Steven Lander (born February 3, 1957) is an American mathematician and geneticist who is a professor of biology at the Massachusetts Institute of Technology (MIT), and a professor of systems biology at Harvard Medical School.

Lander received a MacArthur Fellowship. He founded the Whitehead Institute Center for Genome Research, was a principal leader of the Human Genome Project, and was the founding director of the Broad Institute. He was Science Advisor to the President for Presidents Obama and Biden.

== Early life and education ==
Lander was born in Brooklyn, New York City, to Jewish parents, the son of Rhoda G. Lander, a social studies teacher, and Harold Lander, an attorney. He was captain of the math team at Stuyvesant High School, graduating in 1974 as valedictorian and an International Mathematical Olympiad Silver Medalist for the U.S. At age 17, he wrote a paper on quasiperfect numbers, for which he won the 1974 Westinghouse Science Talent Search.

After graduating from Stuyvesant High School as valedictorian in 1974, Lander graduated from Princeton University in 1978 as valedictorian and with a Bachelor of Arts in mathematics. He completed his senior thesis, "On the structure of projective modules", under John Coleman Moore's supervision. He then moved to the University of Oxford where he was a Rhodes Scholar and student of Wolfson College, Oxford. He was awarded a Doctor of Philosophy degree by the University of Oxford in 1980 with a thesis on algebraic coding theory and symmetric block designs supervised by Peter Cameron.

== Career ==
During his career, Lander has worked on human genetic variation, human population history, genome evolution, non-coding RNAs, three-dimensional folding of the human genome and genome-wide association studies to discover the genes essential for biological processes using CRISPR-based editing.

=== Early mathematical career ===
As a mathematician, Lander studied combinatorics and applications of representation theory to coding theory. He enjoyed mathematics but did not wish to spend his life in such a "monastic" career. Unsure what to do next, he took a job teaching managerial economics at Harvard Business School. At the suggestion of his brother, developmental biologist Arthur Lander, he started to look at neurobiology, saying at the time, "because there's a lot of information in the brain". To understand mathematical neurobiology, he felt he had to study cellular neurobiology; this, in turn, led to studying microbiology and eventually genetics. "When I finally feel I have learned genetics, I should get back to these other problems. But I'm still trying to get the genetics right", Lander said.

Lander later became acquainted with David Botstein, a geneticist at the Massachusetts Institute of Technology (MIT). Botstein was working on a way to unravel how subtle differences in complex genetic systems can become disorders such as cancer, diabetes, schizophrenia, and even obesity. The two collaborated to develop a computer algorithm to analyze the maps of genes. In 1986 Lander joined the Whitehead Institute and became an assistant professor at MIT. He was awarded a MacArthur Fellowship in 1987. In 1990, he founded the Whitehead Institute/MIT Center for Genome Research (WICGR). The WICGR became one of the world's leading centers of genome research, and under Lander's leadership made great progress in developing new methods of analyzing mammalian genomes. It also made important breakthroughs in applying this information to the study of human genetic variation and formed the basis for the foundation of the Broad Institute—a transformation Lander spearheaded.

=== Forensic science and criminal justice ===
In 1989, Lander provided expert testimony in the New York criminal case People v. Castro. He showed that the then-current method of interpreting DNA evidence was liable to give false positive matches, implicating innocent defendants. Two of the defense attorneys in that case, Peter Neufeld and Barry Scheck, went on to found the Innocence Project, an organization that uses DNA analysis to exonerate wrongly convicted prisoners. Lander is a member of the Innocence Project's board of directors.

=== Human Genome Project ===
Two main groups attempted to sequence the human genome. The first was the Human Genome Project, a loosely organized, publicly funded effort that intended to publish the information it obtained freely and without restrictions. Many research groups from countries all over the world were involved in this effort. The second was undertaken by Celera Genomics, which intended to patent the information obtained and charge subscriptions for use of the sequence data. Established first, the Human Genome Project moved slowly in the early phases as the Department of Energy's role was unclear and sequencing technology was in its infancy. Officially, the Human Genome Project had an eight-year head start before Celera entered the race, though discussions for the Human Genome Project began fourteen years before Celera announced their own project. Because the Human Genome Project was a $3 billion publicly funded venture, the consortia raced to enter as much of the human genome into the public domain as quickly as possible once Celera began work in 1998. This was a change of strategy for the Human Genome Project, because many scientists at the time wanted to establish a more complete copy of the genome, not simply publish the many fragments individually. Lander aggressively pressured Human Genome Project scientists to work longer and faster to publish genome fragments before Celera. Lander himself is now listed on 73 patents and patent applications related to genomics.

In February 2001, both the Human Genome Project and Celera published drafts of the human genome in the scientific journals Nature and Science, respectively. In the Human Genome Project's Nature publication, the Whitehead Institute for Biomedical Research, Center for Genome Research, was listed first, with Lander listed as the first named author.

Leveraging Celera's sequencing and analysis techniques, the Whitehead Institute also made a contribution to the sequencing of the mouse genome, an important step in fully understanding the molecular biology of mice, which are often used as model organisms in studies of everything from human diseases to embryonic development. The WICGR has since sequenced the genomes of Ciona savignyi (sea squirt), the pufferfish, the filamentous fungus Neurospora crassa, and multiple relatives of Saccharomyces cerevisiae, one of the most studied yeasts.

Lander was the founding editor of the Annual Review of Genomics and Human Genetics. He remained editor until 2004.

=== After Human Genome Project ===
Lander is the founding director of the Broad Institute, a collaboration between MIT, Harvard, the Whitehead Institute, and affiliated hospitals. Its goal is "to bring the power of genomics to bear on the understanding of disease and to accelerate the search for cures." In particular, Lander has discovered scientific facts in cell biology and molecular biology of cancer, as well as push precision medicine approaches. He is often credited as among the drivers for the Broad Institute's meteoric rise during the 16 years he was a director.

During the Obama presidency, Lander cochaired the Presidential Council of Advisors on Science and Technology.

=== Toast to James Watson ===
Lander toasted James Watson in 2018 for his 90th birthday, which caused controversy in the wake of Watson's widely criticized comments around intelligence and race. Lander had included a brief aside in his toast stating that Watson was flawed, but still later apologized for his toast after significant outrage from academics on Twitter. STAT News noted that other scientists had also similarly toasted Watson, but had not elicited similar outrage.

=== CRISPR-Cas 9 Controversy ===
Lander received criticism in the past for allegedly diminishing the accomplishments of Jennifer Doudna and Emmanuelle Charpentier after publishing "The Heroes of CRISPR" in Cell. Some argued that his article was misogynistic for having removed women scientists from history. Of particular note, Lander was accused of a conflict of interest, as the Broad Institute had been competing with UC Berkeley for patent rights to commercialize CRISPR. Lander responded by suggesting he had not meant "to diminish anybody" and noted that science is collaborative by nature. Some argue that criticism was particularly harsh online by other academics and biologists due to previous resentment with Lander. During questioning for his role of Science Advisor to the President, Lander admitted that he had made a mistake in understating the accomplishments of Doudna and Charpentier.

=== Science Advisor to the President ===
In 2009, Lander was appointed by President Obama as co-chair of the President's Council of Advisors on Science and Technology (PCAST), serving for the entire term (2009 to 2017).

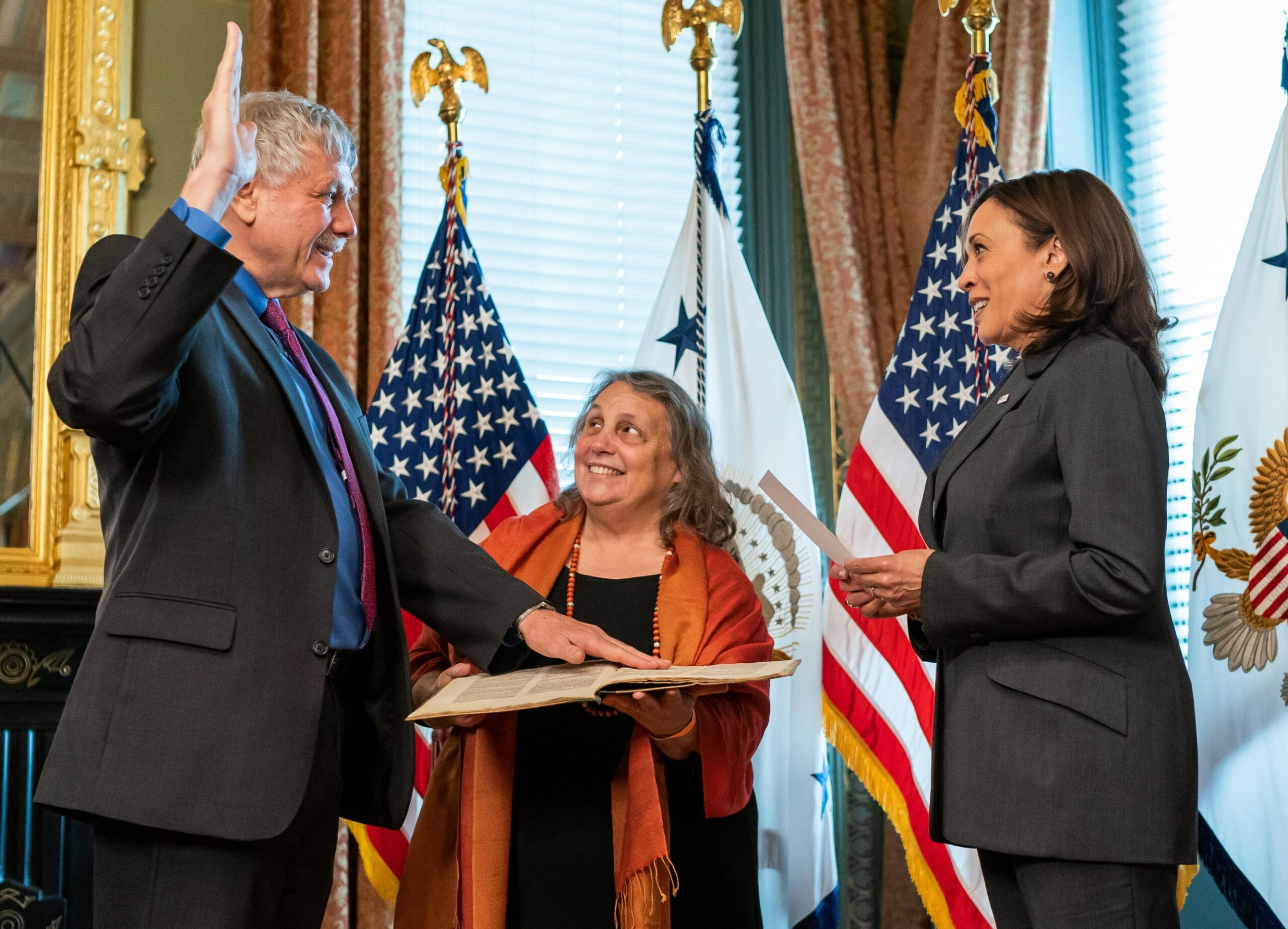
Vice President Kamala Harris swears in Lander as director of the Office of Science and Technology Policy, June 2021.

In January 2021, President-elect Joe Biden nominated Lander as Science Advisor to the President and announced that he would elevate the position to a Cabinet-level post. In January 2021, the organization "500 Women Scientists" published an editorial in Scientific American to consider naming someone else to the position, because he was well known within the scientific community for offending women. His nomination had been held up possibly due to requests for clarification about his having attended two gatherings where Jeffrey Epstein, a wealthy large-scale donor to science who was also a convicted sex offender, was present. He was also questioned about accusations of sexism and his toast to James Watson. On April 29, a confirmation hearing was held in the Senate Committee on Commerce, Science, and Transportation. On May 20, the committee voted to report favorably on the nomination, with five Republican senators voting against. On May 28, 2021, before a Memorial Day recess, his nomination was confirmed by voice vote by the full Senate. Lander was sworn in as director of the Office of Science and Technology Policy (OSTP) on June 2, 2021. He took his oath using a rare 1492 copy of the Pirkei Avot.

On February 7, 2022, Politico reported on a White House investigation in which fourteen current and former Office of Science and Technology Policy staffers accused Lander on February 4 of having bullied and demeaned his subordinates. Lander issued an apology to staff on February 4, his apology includes, "I am devastated that I caused hurt to past and present colleagues by the way in which I have spoken to them... I believe it is not possible to continue effectively in my role, and the work of this office is far too important to be hindered." He later resigned on February 7. In the following month, Politico published an analysis of Lander's connections with Eric Schmidt. Politico documented the appearance of conflicts of interest related to Schmidt's financial support for many of the employees of the OSTP.

=== After resignation ===
Since 2023, Lander has returned to his tenured professor positions at MIT and Harvard as well as the Broad Institute as a Core Institute Member and Founding Director Emeritus. While some opinion pieces argued that "Eric Lander is getting uncanceled", The Chronicle of Higher Education noted that some staffers at the Broad expressed alarm at Lander's sudden return without further discussion from their leadership. In 2023, Lander started a non-profit called Science for America focused on "moonshot" ideas such as nuclear fusion or cancer research.

==== Fusion startup ====
Lander became founding chief executive officer of Pacific Fusion in 2023 or 2024.

=== Recognition and service ===
In 1999, Lander received the Golden Plate Award of the American Academy of Achievement.

In 2004, Lander was named one of Time magazine's 100 most influential people of our time for his work on the Human Genome Project. He has appeared in numerous PBS documentaries about genetics. He was ranked number 2 on the MIT150 list of MIT's innovators and ideas.

In December 2008, Lander and Harold E. Varmus were named co-chairs of the Obama administration's Council of Advisors on Science and Technology. In 2012 he received the Dan David Prize.

Lander is a member of the advisory board to the USA Science and Engineering Festival.

In 2013, Lander was awarded the first Breakthrough Prize in Life Sciences. In 2016, Semantic Scholar AI program ranked him #1 on its list of most influential biomedical researchers.

In 2016, he received the Award for Excellence in Molecular Diagnostics from the Association for Molecular Pathology.

In 2017, Lander received an honoris causa doctorate from the Université catholique de Louvain. Also in 2017, he received the William Allan Award from the American Society of Human Genetics.

In 2019, he served on the Life Sciences jury for the Infosys Prize. In 2020, Pope Francis appointed him a member of the Pontifical Academy of Sciences. In 2021, Lander, who holds many patents, disclosed ownership of assets worth more than $45 million.

Political offices
Preceded by Kei Koizumi; Acting	Science Advisor to the President; 2021–2022	Succeeded by Francis Collins; Acting
Preceded by Kei Koizumi; Acting	Director of the Office of Science and Technology Policy; 2021–2022	Succeeded by Alondra Nelson; Acting
