= Kelvin Droegemeier =

American research meteorologist (born 1958)

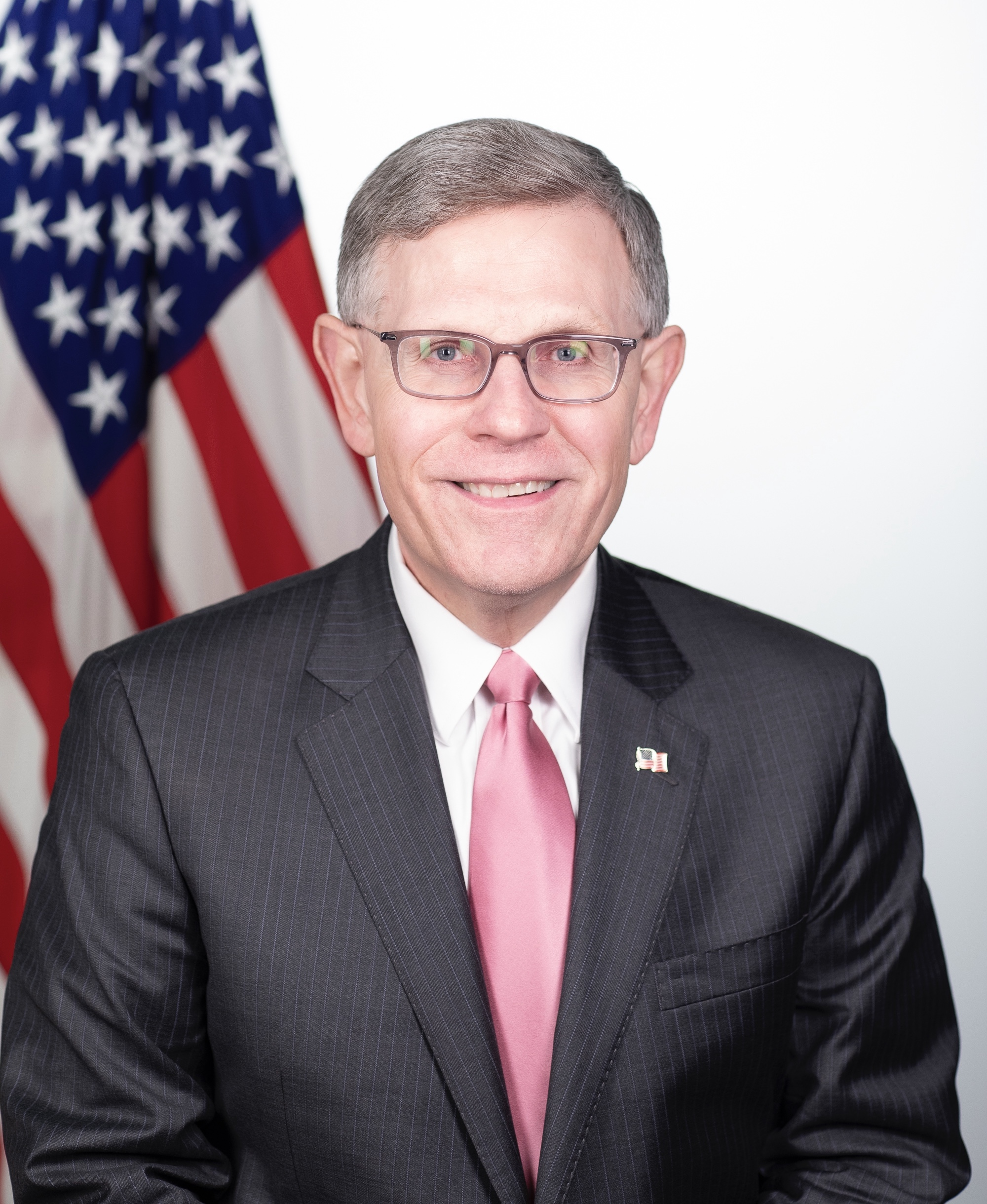
- Official portrait, 2019

10th Director of the Office of Science and Technology Policy
- In office January 11, 2019 – January 20, 2021
- President: Donald Trump
- Preceded by: Ted Wackler (acting)
- Succeeded by: Kei Koizumi (acting)

Acting Director of the National Science Foundation
- In office March 31, 2020 – June 22, 2020
- President: Donald Trump
- Preceded by: France A. Córdova
- Succeeded by: Sethuraman Panchanathan

Oklahoma Secretary of Science and Technology
- In office March 13, 2017 – January 11, 2019
- Governor: Mary Fallin
- Preceded by: Stephen McKeever
- Succeeded by: Kayse Shrum

Personal details
- Born: September 23, 1958 (age 67) Ellsworth, Kansas, U.S.
- Education: University of Oklahoma (BS); University of Illinois, Urbana-Champaign (MS, PhD)
- Scientific career
- Fields: Meteorology
- Institutions: University of Oklahoma; National Science Board; University of Illinois Urbana-Champaign
- Thesis: The Numerical Simulation of Thunderstorm Outflow Dynamics (Gust Front, Kelvin-Helmholtz Instability, Wind Shear, Microbursts) (1985)
- Doctoral advisor: Robert Wilhelmson

Kelvin Kay Droegemeier (born September 23, 1958) is an American research meteorologist, most recently having served as director of the White House Office of Science and Technology Policy. Droegemeier is known for his research in predicting the development of extreme weather events, and previously served as Oklahoma Secretary of Science and Technology and the vice president for research at the University of Oklahoma. He currently is serving as a professor and special advisor to the chancellor for science and policy at the University of Illinois Urbana-Champaign.

== Academic career ==
Droegemeier was born on September 23, 1958, in Ellsworth, Kansas. He received a B.S. in meteorology at the University of Oklahoma in 1980. He then pursued graduate studies in atmospheric science at the University of Illinois at Urbana–Champaign, earning an M.S. in 1982 and a Ph.D. in 1985. In 1985 he joined the faculty of the University of Oklahoma.

Droegemeier's academic research has focused on extreme weather events. In the 1990s, he became known for research on computer simulations of thunderstorm development, drawing on advancements in both radar and computer technology.

He went on to co-found two centers of the National Science Foundation: the Center for Analysis and Prediction of Storms in 1989, and the Engineering Research Center for Collaborative Adaptive Sensing of the Atmosphere in 2003. He also founded and directed the Sasaki Institute, a now-defunct non-profit organization at the University of Oklahoma. In 2000 he started a weather technology company. Droegemeier became Vice President for Research at the University of Oklahoma in 2009, and held this position until August 2018.

At the conclusion of his appointment at OSTP, Droegemeier returned to the University of Oklahoma, where he serves as Regents Professor of Meteorology, Roger and Sherry Teigen Presidential Professor, and Weathernews Chair Emeritus.

== Political appointments ==
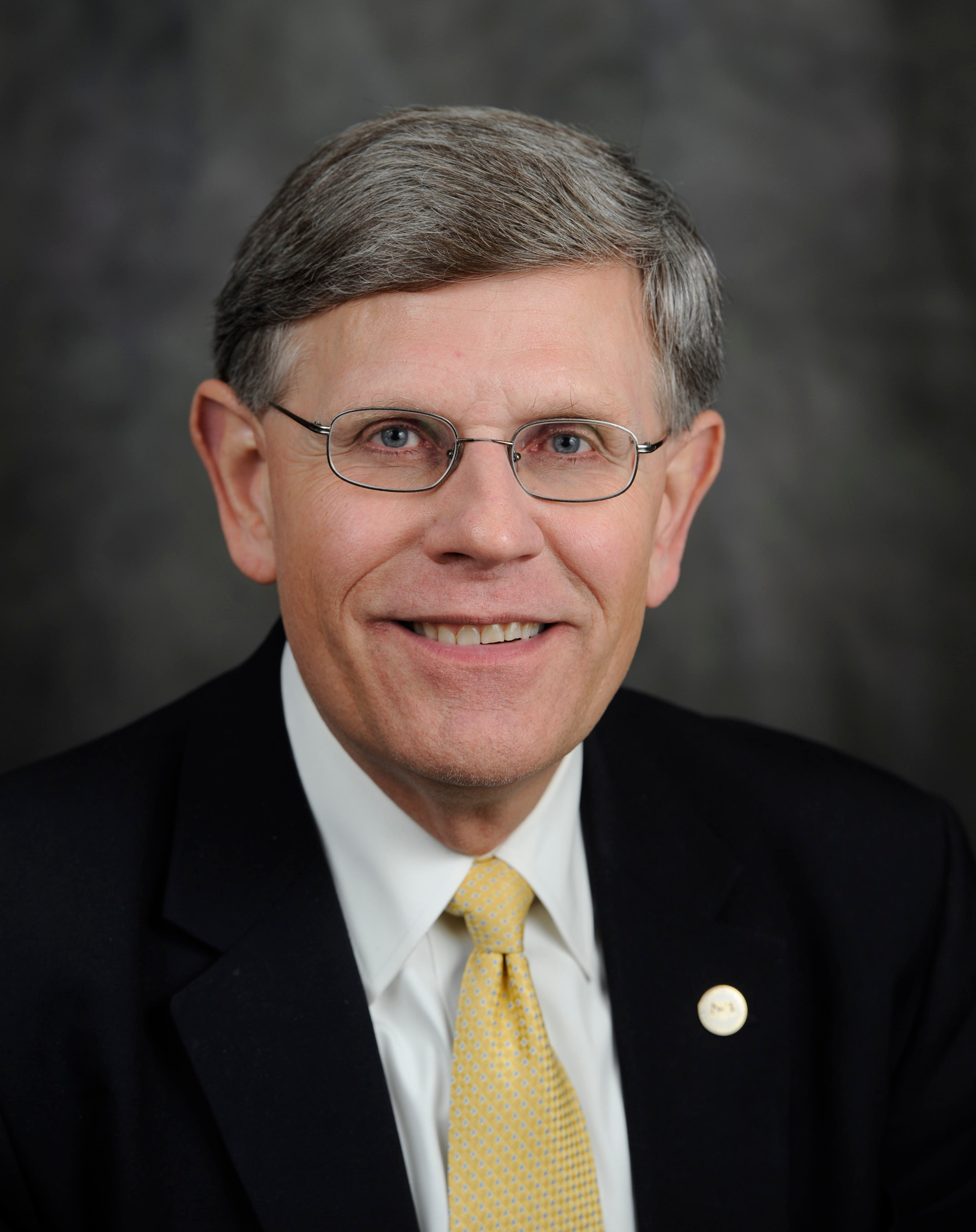
National Science Board photo (2014)

Droegemeier served on the National Science Board for 12 years during the George W. Bush and Obama administrations beginning in 2004, including as vice chairman during 2012–2016. He was appointed Oklahoma Secretary of Science and Technology in March 2017.

In August 2018, Droegemeier was nominated to be the director of the Office of Science and Technology Policy (OSTP). The position had been vacant since January 2017. He was noted for being a strong supporter of federally funded research. Droegemeier would be the first OSTP Director who is not a physicist. Reaction to the nomination from the scientific community was generally positive. Previous OSTP director John Holdren called the nomination "a solid choice", and American Association for the Advancement of Science CEO and former Democratic congressman Rush Holt expressed approval of the nomination. On September 5, 2018, the Senate Committee on Commerce, Science and Transportation voted unanimously to approve Droegemeier's nomination. Droegemeier was confirmed by the Senate on January 2, 2019, the final day of the 115th United States Congress. He was sworn in officially on January 11, 2019, and then ceremonially by Vice President Mike Pence on February 11, 2019.

On March 1, 2020, Vice President Pence and Health and Human Services Secretary Alex Azar announced the addition of Droegemeier to the White House Coronavirus Task Force. Effective March 31, 2020, he was named Acting Director of the National Science Foundation following the end of France A. Córdova's term.

Droegemeier returned to his professorships at the University of Oklahoma when President Trump left office in January 2021.

Political offices
Preceded by Ted Wackler; Acting	Director of the Office of Science and Technology Policy; 2019–2021	Succeeded by Kei Koizumi; Acting
