= John R. Campbell =

15th President of Oklahoma State University
- In office 1988–1993
- Preceded by: Lawrence L. Boger
- Succeeded by: Ray M. Bowen (Interim)

Personal details
- Born: John Roy Campbell; June 14, 1933 McDonald County, Missouri, U.S.
- Died: November 17, 2018 (aged 85) Columbia, Missouri, U.S.
- Occupation: Professor, College Administrator, Author

John Roy Campbell (June 14, 1933 – November 17, 2018) was an American dairy scientist and university administrator who was a professor of dairy science at the University of Missouri from 1960 to 1977, was professor, Associate Dean and Dean of Agriculture at the University of Illinois from 1977 to 1988, and was professor at Oklahoma State University from 1988 to 1993, serving as University President from 1988 to 1993.

== Early years ==
John Campbell was born June 14, 1933, to Carl and Helen Campbell in his maternal grandparents' home in McDonald County, Missouri near the town of Goodman. He was the first member of his immediate family to graduate from high school.

Receiving a scholarship from Sears, Roebuck & Co. inspired him to enroll in the University of Missouri-Columbia, where he earned a Bachelor of Science Degree with honors in 1955. During his time in college, he met Eunice Vieten, who had also been raised on a Missouri dairy farm.

== Career ==
=== Military service ===
Campbell had joined the Reserve Officers Training Corps (ROTC), while in college, which obligated him to a two-year stint in the regular army. Before graduation, he received a fellowship to earn a Master of Science degree in Dairy Science from the Missouri University School of Dairy Manufacturing (MU). Then he spent one year serving in the Army Reserves, before serving two years of active duty with the 7th Artillery Division of the regular army. When he completed his tour of duty, he returned to UM and earned a PhD in 1960. Campbell also joined the Army Reserves and served in the Field Artillery for the next 22 years, becoming a Lieutenant Colonel and Battery Commander. In 1983, the U.S. Army awarded him its Meritorious Service Medal.

=== Teaching ===
Campbell joined the MU faculty immediately after receiving his PhD and rose through the academic ranks even as he performed his military obligations, becoming a full professor in 1968. He remained at MU until 1977, teaching classes and writing three books. He was then successfully recruited by the University of Illinois to serve as Associate Dean and Director of Resident Instruction for its College of Agriculture. He was credited with establishing a new and aggressive program to recruit, recognize and support high-caliber students who wished to pursue careers related to agriculture and relevant professions. He named the scholarship fund, Jonathan Baldwin Turner (JBT) Agricultural Merit Scholarship Program.

Campbell was appointed Dean of the College of Agriculture at the University of Illinois in 1983. He demonstrated innovation, dedication and cooperation with people, both within the College of Agriculture and outside. He led a fund drive that raised $61.2 million to construct five new facilities, a time that his UI colleagues called "...a golden era".

=== University President ===
On August 1, 1988, Campbell was appointed as 15th President of Oklahoma State University (OSU), where his focus still featured international involvement and inter-university partnerships and expanded distance learning. There were no major initiatives during this period. He resigned the presidency in 1993, saying that he wanted to resume teaching in the College of Agriculture and writing.

=== Retirement ===
Campbell resigned from OSU in 1999 and moved back to Columbia, Missouri. He served as a Consultant-Evaluator for the Higher Learning Commission/North Central Association and also served on the National University of Natural Medicine's Board of Directors from 1998 to 2013. He even wrote a novel, hoping to improve public perceptions of higher education. Dry Rot in the Ivory Tower ... A Case for Fumigation, Ventilation, and Renewal of the Academic Sanctuarypresented his views on changes needed in the higher education system.

== Personal life ==
On August 7, 1954, Campbell married Eunice Vieten. They have two daughters and one son, who predeceased him.

Campbell died in Columbia on November 17, 2018, where he was buried with military honors. The cause of death was not given, but his obituary indicates he had been ill for several years.
