= List of Phi Beta Kappa chapters =

Phi Beta Kappa is the oldest academic honor society in the United States. It was founded at the College of William & Mary in December 1776. In the following list, active chapters are indicated in bold and inactive chapters and institutions are in italics.

Number (Note: The numbering system indicated order of charter. However, in 1922, the Catalogue of the Cornell Chapter renumbers the chapter, excluding the Alpha of Alabama which had gone extinct during the Civil War.)	Chapter	Charter date and range	Institution	Location	Status	Ref.
1	**Alpha of Virginia**	December 5, 1776 – 1780; 1851–1860; 1893	College of William & Mary	Williamsburg, Virginia	Active	
2	**Alpha of Connecticut**	November 13, 1780 – 1871; 1884	Yale University	New Haven, Connecticut	Active	
3	**Alpha Iota of Massachusetts (Note: The Alpha chapter at Harvard and the Iota chapter at Radcliffe merged as the Alpha-Iota chapter of Massachusetts at Harvard University, effective June 1995.)**	September 5, 1781	Harvard University	Cambridge, Massachusetts	Active	
4	**Alpha of New Hampshire**	August 20, 1787	Dartmouth College	Hanover, New Hampshire	Active	
5	**Alpha of New York**	May 1, 1817	Union College	Schenectady, New York	Active	
6	**Alpha of Maine**	February 22, 1825	Bowdoin College	Brunswick, Maine	Active	
7	**Alpha of Rhode Island**	July 31, 1830	Brown University	Providence, Rhode Island	Active	
8	**Beta of Connecticut**	July 2, 1845	Trinity College	Hartford, Connecticut	Active	
9	**Gamma of Connecticut**	July 7, 1845	Wesleyan University	Middletown, Connecticut	Active	
10	**Alpha of Ohio**	October 28, 1847	Case Western Reserve University	Cleveland, Ohio	Active	(Note: Established at Western Reserve College)
11	**Alpha of Vermont**	March 7, 1848	University of Vermont	Burlington, Vermont	Active	
12	**Alpha of Alabama**	June 1851–1860; 1912	University of Alabama	Tuscaloosa, Alabama	Active	(Note: Chapter was disbanded at the outbreak of the Civil War.)
13	**Beta of Massachusetts**	August 9, 1853	Amherst College	Amherst, Massachusetts	Active	
14	**Beta of Ohio**	June 29, 1858	Kenyon College	Gambier, Ohio	Active	
15	**Beta of New York**	December 23, 1858	New York University	New York City, New York	Active	
16	**Gamma of Ohio**	June 9, 1860	Marietta College	Marietta, Ohio	Active	
17	**Gamma of Massachusetts**	July 30, 1864	Williams College	Williamstown, Massachusetts	Active	
18	**Gamma of New York**	July 24, 1867	City College of New York	New York City, New York	Active	
19	**Beta of Vermont**	August 17, 1868	Middlebury College	Middlebury, Vermont	Active	
20	**Alpha of New Jersey**	February 22, 1869	Rutgers University–New Brunswick	New Brunswick, New Jersey	Active	
21	**Delta of New York**	April 22, 1869	Columbia University	New York City, New York	Active	
22	**Epsilon of New York**	May 24, 1870	Hamilton College	Clinton, New York	Active	
23	**Zeta of New York**	July 6, 1871	Hobart and William Smith Colleges	Geneva, New York	Active	
24	**Eta of New York**	June 19, 1878	Colgate University	Hamilton, New York	Active	
25	**Theta of New York**	May 28, 1882	Cornell University	Ithaca, New York	Active	
26	**Alpha of Pennsylvania**	April 13, 1887	Dickinson College	Carlisle, Pennsylvania	Active	
27	**Beta of Pennsylvania**	April 15, 1887	Lehigh University	Bethlehem, Pennsylvania	Active	
28	**Iota of New York**	April 20, 1887	University of Rochester	Rochester, New York	Active	
29	**Alpha of Indiana**	December 17, 1889	DePauw University	Greencastle, Indiana	Active	
30	**Alpha of Illinois**	February 18, 1890	Northwestern University	Evanston, Illinois	Active	
31	**Alpha of Kansas**	April 2, 1890	University of Kansas	Lawrence, Kansas	Active	
32	**Gamma of Pennsylvania**	April 5, 1890	Lafayette College	Easton, Pennsylvania	Active	
33	**Delta of Massachusetts**	November 18, 1892	Tufts University	Medford and Somerville, Massachusetts	Active	
34	**Delta of Pennsylvania**	December 9, 1892	University of Pennsylvania	Philadelphia, Pennsylvania	Active	
35	**Alpha of Minnesota**	December 13, 1892	University of Minnesota	Minneapolis and Saint Paul, Minnesota	Active	
36	**Alpha of Iowa**	September 30, 1895	University of Iowa	Iowa City, Iowa	Active	
37	**Alpha of Maryland**	October 10, 1895	Johns Hopkins University	Baltimore, Maryland	Active	
38	**Alpha of Nebraska**	December 23, 1895	University of Nebraska–Lincoln	Lincoln, Nebraska	Active	
39	**Beta of Maine**	January 3, 1896	Colby College	Waterville, Maine	Active	
40	**Kappa of New York**	February 10, 1896	Syracuse University	Syracuse, New York	Active	
41	**Epsilon of Pennsylvania**	June 9, 1896	Swarthmore College	Swarthmore, Pennsylvania	Active	
42	**Mu of New York**	April 7, 1899	Vassar College	Poughkeepsie, New York	Active	
43	**Beta of Indiana**	November 7, 1898	Wabash College	Crawfordsville, Indiana	Active	
44	**Alpha of California**	December 23, 1898	University of California, Berkeley	Berkeley, California	Active	
45	**Zeta of Pennsylvania**	January 20, 1899	Haverford College	Haverford, Pennsylvania	Active	
46	**Alpha of Wisconsin**	February 2, 1899	University of Wisconsin–Madison	Madison, Wisconsin	Active	
47	**Epsilon of Massachusetts**	February 8, 1899	Boston University	Boston, Massachusetts	Active	
48	**Delta of Ohio**	April 11, 1899	University of Cincinnati	Cincinnati, Ohio	Active	
49	**Beta of New Jersey**	June 7, 1899	Princeton University	Princeton, New Jersey	Active	
50	**Lambda of New York**	June 24, 1899	St. Lawrence University	Canton, New York	Active	
51	**Beta of Illinois**	July 1, 1899	University of Chicago	Chicago, Illinois	Active	
52	**Alpha of Tennessee**	November 5, 1901	Vanderbilt University	Nashville, Tennessee	Active	
53	**Alpha of Missouri**	December 5, 1901	University of Missouri	Columbia, Missouri	Active	
54	**Eta of Pennsylvania**	February 18, 1902	Allegheny College	Meadville, Pennsylvania	Active	
55	**Alpha of Colorado**	October 18, 1904	University of Colorado Boulder	Boulder, Colorado	Active	
56	**Zeta of Massachusetts**	October 19, 1904	Smith College	Northampton, Massachusetts	Active	
57	**Beta of California**	November 1, 1904	Stanford University	Stanford, California	Active	
58	**Alpha of North Carolina**	November 7, 1904	University of North Carolina at Chapel Hill	Chapel Hill, North Carolina	Active	
59	**Beta of Colorado**	November 11, 1904	Colorado College	Colorado Springs, Colorado	Active	
60	**Eta of Massachusetts**	November 14, 1904	Wellesley College	Wellesley, Massachusetts	Active	
61	**Epsilon of Ohio**	December 8, 1904	Ohio State University	Columbus, Ohio	Active	
62	**Theta of Massachusetts**	January 30, 1905	Mount Holyoke College	South Hadley, Massachusetts	Active	
63	**Alpha of Texas**	February 2, 1905	University of Texas at Austin	Austin, Texas	Active	
64	**Beta of Maryland**	February 24, 1905	Goucher College	Towson, Maryland	Active	
65	**Zeta of Ohio**	November 8, 1907	Oberlin College	Oberlin, Ohio	Active	
66	**Eta of Ohio**	November 9, 1907	Ohio Wesleyan University	Delaware, Ohio	Active	
67	**Gamma of Illinois**	November 11, 1907	University of Illinois at Urbana–Champaign	Urbana and Champaign, Illinois	Active	
68	**Alpha of Michigan**	November 13, 1907	University of Michigan	Ann Arbor, Michigan	Active	
69	**Theta of Pennsylvania**	January 30, 1908	Franklin & Marshall College	Lancaster, Pennsylvania	Active	
70	**Beta of Iowa**	April 11, 1908	Grinnell College	Grinnell, Iowa	Active	
71	**Beta of Virginia**	June 16, 1908	University of Virginia	Charlottesville, Virginia	Active	
72	**Alpha of Louisiana**	February 26, 1909	Tulane University	New Orleans, Louisiana	Active	
73	**Alpha of West Virginia**	December 5, 1910	West Virginia University	Morgantown, West Virginia	Active	
74	**Theta of Ohio**	January 18, 1911	Denison University	Granville, Ohio	Active	
75	**Gamma of Indiana**	January 20, 1911	Indiana University Bloomington	Bloomington, Indiana	Active	
76	**Gamma of Virginia**	May 5, 1911	Washington and Lee University	Lexington, Virginia	Active	
77	**Iota of Ohio**	June 14, 1911	Miami University	Oxford, Ohio	Active	
78	**Beta of Wisconsin**	June 19, 1911	Beloit College	Beloit, Wisconsin	Active	
79	**Gamma of Wisconsin**	February 20, 1914	Lawrence University	Appleton, Wisconsin	Active	**(Note: Gamma of Wisconsin was combined with the Delta chapter at Milwaukee-Downer College after the two schools merged in 1964)**
80	**Gamma of California**	March 7, 1914	Pomona College	Claremont, California	Active	
81	**Alpha of Georgia**	March 14, 1914	University of Georgia	Athens, Georgia	Active	
82	**Beta of Minnesota**	March 31, 1914	Carleton College	Northfield, Minnesota	Active	
83	**Alpha of Washington**	April 20, 1914	University of Washington	Seattle, Washington	Active	
84	Iota of Massachusetts	May 11, 1914	Radcliffe College	Cambridge, Massachusetts	Consolidated	
85	**Beta of Missouri**	May 13, 1914	Washington University in St. Louis	St. Louis, Missouri	Active	
86	**Alpha of North Dakota**	June 13, 1914	University of North Dakota	Grand Forks, North Dakota	Active	
87	**Delta of Illinois**	February 15, 1917	Knox College	Galesburg, Illinois	Active	
88	**Delta of Virginia**	May 5, 1917	Randolph College	Lynchburg, Virginia	Active	(Note: Chapter was formed at Randolph Macon Women's College, now Randolph College.)
89	**Gamma of Maine**	May 29, 1917	Bates College	Lewiston, Maine	Active	
90	**Beta of North Carolina**	March 29, 1920	Duke University	Durham, North Carolina	Active	
91	**Nu of New York**	February 11, 1920	Hunter College	New York City, New York	Active	
92	**Beta of Washington**	January 20, 1920	Whitman College	Walla Walla, Washington	Active	
93	**Alpha of Oklahoma**	May 24, 1920	University of Oklahoma	Norman, Oklahoma	Active	
94	**Iota of Pennsylvania**	January 11, 1923	Gettysburg College	Gettysburg, Pennsylvania	Active	
95	**Delta of Maine**	January 26, 1923	University of Maine	Orono, Maine	Active	
96	**Gamma of North Carolina**	March 1, 1923	Davidson College	Davidson, North Carolina	Active	
97	**Alpha of Oregon**	April 14, 1923	University of Oregon	Eugene, Oregon	Active	
98	**Gamma of Iowa**	April 19, 1923	Drake University	Des Moines, Iowa	Active	
99	**Delta of Iowa**	May 3, 1923	Cornell College	Mount Vernon, Iowa	Active	
100	**Alpha of Kentucky**	September 8, 1925	University of Kentucky	Lexington, Kentucky	Active	
101	**Beta of Tennessee**	March 16, 1926	Sewanee: The University of the South	Sewanee, Tennessee	Active	
102	**Beta of Georgia**	March 23, 1926	Agnes Scott College	Decatur, Georgia	Active	
103	**Alpha of South Carolina**	April 8, 1926	University of South Carolina	Columbia, South Carolina	Active	
104	**Kappa of Ohio**	April 20, 1926	College of Wooster	Wooster, Ohio	Active	
105	**Delta of California**	May 12, 1926	Occidental College	Los Angeles, California	Active	
106	**Alpha of South Dakota**	June 4, 1926	University of South Dakota	Vermillion, South Dakota	Active	
107	**Alpha of Idaho**	June 5, 1926	University of Idaho	Moscow, Idaho	Active	
108	**Beta of Texas**	March 1, 1929	Rice University	Houston, Texas	Active	
109	**Epsilon of California**	March 14, 1929	University of Southern California	Los Angeles, California	Active	
110	**Zeta of California**	March 16, 1929	Mills College at Northeastern University	Oakland, California	Active	
111	**Gamma of Georgia**	April 3, 1929	Emory University	Atlanta, Georgia	Active	
112	Gamma of Washington	April 6, 1929 – 2022	Washington State University	Pullman, Washington	Inactive	
113	**Epsilon of Virginia**	April 12, 1929	University of Richmond	Richmond, Virginia	Active	
114	**Lambda of Ohio**	April 26, 1929	Ohio University	Athens, Ohio	Active	
115	**Alpha of Arizona**	April 20, 1932	University of Arizona	Tucson, Arizona	Active	
116	**Alpha of Arkansas**	April 4, 1932	University of Arkansas	Fayetteville, Arkansas	Active	
117	**Epsilon of Illinois**	April 6, 1932	Illinois College	Jacksonville, Illinois	Active	
118	Xi of New York	May 7, 1932 – 2024	Wells College	Aurora, New York	Inactive	(Note: The college closed in 2024)
119	**Kappa of Massachusetts**	March 18, 1932	Wheaton College	Norton, Massachusetts	Active	
120	**Alpha of Utah**	January 3, 1935	University of Utah	Salt Lake City, Utah	Active	
121	**Delta of Connecticut**	February 13, 1935	Connecticut College	New London, Connecticut	Active	
122	**Alpha of Florida**	March 4, 1935	Florida State University	Tallahassee, Florida	Active	(Note: Chapter's installation was between March 4 and 5, 1935)
123	**Kappa of Pennsylvania**	October 30, 1937	Washington & Jefferson College	Washington, Pennsylvania	Active	
124	Beta of Alabama	November 26, 1937	Birmingham–Southern College	Birmingham, Alabama	Inactive	
125	**Lambda of Pennsylvania**	December 7, 1937	Pennsylvania State University	University Park, Pennsylvania	Active	
126	**Omicron of New York**	January 29, 1938	University at Buffalo	Buffalo, New York	Active	
127	**Beta of Florida**	February 17, 1938	University of Florida	Gainesville, Florida	Active	(Note: Chapter was installed between February 17 and 18, 1938.)
128	**Zeta of Virginia**	1937	Randolph–Macon College	Ashland, Virginia	Active	(Note: Originally chartered as a section of Delta of Virginia in 1923)
129	**Eta of California**	January 14, 1938	University of California, Los Angeles	Los Angeles, California	Active	(Note: Originally chartered as a section of Alpha of California.)
130	**Alpha of D.C.**	February 22, 1938	George Washington University	Washington, D.C.	Active	
131	**Beta of Oregon**	May 6, 1938	Reed College	Portland, Oregon	Active	
132	**Gamma of Minnesota**	May 17, 1938	St. Catherine University	Saint Paul, Minnesota	Active	
133	**Mu of Pennsylvania**	November 7, 1940	Bucknell University	Lewisburg, Pennsylvania	Active	
134	**Beta of Michigan**	November 8, 1940	Albion College	Albion, Michigan	Active	
135	**Gamma of Colorado**	November 25, 1940	University of Denver	Denver, Colorado	Active	
136	**Alpha of Wyoming**	November 26, 1940	University of Wyoming	Laramie, Wyoming	Active	
137	**Pi of New York**	November 29, 1940	Elmira College	Elmira, New York	Active	
138	**Delta of North Carolina**	January 13, 1941	Wake Forest University	Winston-Salem, North Carolina	Active	
139	**Beta of South Carolina**	January 14, 1941	Wofford College	Spartanburg, South Carolina	Active	
140	**Beta of D.C.**	January 15, 1941	Catholic University of America	Washington, D.C.	Active	
141	Delta of Wisconsin	January 21, 1941 – 1964	Milwaukee-Downer College	Milwaukee, Wisconsin	Consolidated	(Note: Chapter consolidated when the college merged with Lawrence University in 1964.)
142	**Delta of Minnesota**	November 4, 1949	St. Olaf College	Northfield, Minnesota	Active	
143	**Gamma of Tennessee**	December 5, 1949	Rhodes College	Memphis, Tennessee	Active	
144	**Gamma of Texas**	December 12, 1949	Southern Methodist University	Dallas, Texas	Active	
145	**Epsilon of Iowa**	December 13, 1949	Coe College	Cedar Rapids, Iowa	Active	
146	**Eta of Virginia**	December 13, 1949	Hampden–Sydney College	Hampden Sydney, Virginia	Active	
147	**Sigma of New York**	January 9, 1950	Queens College, City University of New York	Flushing, Queens, New York City, New York	Active	
148	**Rho of New York**	January 13, 1950	Brooklyn College	Brooklyn, New York	Active	
149	**Nu of Pennsylvania**	January 20, 1950	Wilson College	Chambersburg, Pennsylvania	Active	
150	**Theta of Virginia**	March 3, 1950	Sweet Briar College	Sweet Briar, Virginia	Active	
151	**Zeta of Illinois**	March 17, 1950	Augustana College	Rock Island, Illinois	Active	
152	**Epsilon of Wisconsin**	December 12, 1952	Ripon College	Ripon, Wisconsin	Active	
153	**Beta of New Hampshire**	December 16, 1952	University of New Hampshire	Durham, New Hampshire	Active	
154	**Alpha of Hawaii**	December 19, 1952	University of Hawaiʻi at Mānoa	Honolulu, Hawaii	Active	
155	**Gamma of Michigan**	January 16, 1953	Wayne State University	Detroit, Michigan	Active	
156	**Xi of Pennsylvania**	January 19, 1953	University of Pittsburgh	Pittsburgh, Pennsylvania	Active	
157	**Lambda of Massachusetts**	February 2, 1953	Clark University	Worcester, Massachusetts	Active	
158	**Eta of Illinois**	February 21, 1953	Rockford University	Rockford, Illinois	Active	
159	**Delta of Tennessee**	April 4, 1953	Fisk University	Nashville, Tennessee	Active	
160	**Gamma of D.C.**	April 8, 1953	Howard University	Washington, D.C.	Active	
161	**Epsilon of North Carolina**	February 17, 1956	University of North Carolina at Greensboro	Greensboro, North Carolina	Active	(Note: Originally chartered as a section of Alpha of North Carolina on December 12, 1934)
162	**Epsilon of Connecticut**	April 4, 1956	University of Connecticut	Storrs, Connecticut	Active	
163	**Alpha of Delaware**	April 25, 1956	University of Delaware	Newark, Delaware	Active	
164	**Delta of Michigan**	December 9, 1958	Kalamazoo College	Kalamazoo, Michigan	Active	
165	**Theta of Illinois**	February 9, 1962	Lake Forest College	Lake Forest, Illinois	Active	
166	**Iota of Virginia**	February 20, 1962	Hollins University	Hollins, Virginia	Active	
167	**Tau of New York**	March 1, 1962	Fordham University	New York City, New York	Active	
168	**Theta of California**	March 1, 1962	Scripps College	Claremont, California	Active	
169	**Mu of Massachusetts**	March 5, 1962	Brandeis University	Waltham, Massachusetts	Active	
170	**Omicron of Pennsylvania**	March 15, 1962	Chatham University	Pittsburgh, Pennsylvania	Active	
171	**Gamma of Maryland**	December 16, 1964	University of Maryland, College Park	College Park, Maryland	Active	
172	**Alpha of New Mexico**	April 6, 1965	University of New Mexico	Albuquerque, New Mexico	Active	
173	**Delta of D.C.**	April 29, 1965	Georgetown University	Washington, D.C.	Active	
174	**Delta of Indiana**	February 18, 1965	Earlham College	Richmond, Indiana	Active	
175	**Epsilon of Tennessee**	January 29, 1965	University of Tennessee	Knoxville, Tennessee	Active	
176	**Iota of California**	April 7, 1965	University of California, Riverside	Riverside, California	Active	
177	**Nu of Massachusetts**	March 30, 1965	University of Massachusetts Amherst	Amherst, Massachusetts	Active	
178	**Kappa of California**	May 14, 1968	University of California, Davis	Davis, California	Active	(Note: Originally part of the Alpha of California chapter.)
179	**Lambda of California**	1968	University of California, Santa Barbara	Santa Barbara, California	Active	
180	**Pi of Pennsylvania**	February 23, 1968	Muhlenberg College	Allentown, Pennsylvania	Active	
181	**Epsilon of Minnesota**	February 22, 1968	Macalester College	Saint Paul, Minnesota	Active	
182	**Delta of Georgia**	January 6, 1968	Morehouse College	Atlanta, Georgia	Active	
183	**Epsilon of Michigan**	February 4, 1968	Michigan State University	East Lansing, Michigan	Active	
184	**Epsilon of Indiana**	February 11, 1968	University of Notre Dame	Notre Dame, Indiana	Active	
185	**Gamma of Missouri**	August 27, 1968	Saint Louis University	St. Louis, Missouri	Active	
186	**Beta of Kentucky**	March 12, 1971	Centre College	Danville, Kentucky	Active	
187	**Chi of New York**	1971	Lehman College	Bronx, New York City, New York	Active	
188	**Epsilon of D.C.**	February 18, 1971	Trinity Washington University	Washington, D.C.	Active	
189	**Kappa of Virginia**	February 22, 1971	University of Mary Washington	Fredericksburg, Virginia	Active	
190	**Delta of Texas**	February 24, 1971	Texas Christian University	Fort Worth, Texas	Active	
191	**Lambda of Virginia**	April 26, 1971	Mary Baldwin University	Staunton, Virginia	Active	
192	**Mu of Ohio**	Spring 1971	Hiram College	Hiram, Ohio	Active	
193	**Omicron of Massachusetts**	April 6, 1971	Boston College	Chestnut Hill, Massachusetts	Active	
194	**Phi of New York**	February 20, 1971	Skidmore College	Saratoga Springs, New York	Active	
195	**Psi of New York**	May 7, 1971	Binghamton University	Vestal, New York	Active	
196	**Upsilon of New York**	February 12, 1971	Manhattan College	Bronx, New York City, New York	Active	
197	**Xi of Massachusetts**	1971	Massachusetts Institute of Technology	Cambridge, Massachusetts	Active	
198	**Zeta of Indiana**	February 23, 1971	Purdue University	West Lafayette, Indiana	Active	
199	**Zeta of Michigan**	February 13, 1971	Hope College	Holland, Michigan	Active	
200	**Zeta of Wisconsin**	1971	Marquette University	Milwaukee, Wisconsin	Active	
	**Beta of Arizona**	1973	Arizona State University	Tempe, Arizona	Active	
	**Delta of Colorado**	November 15, 1973	Colorado State University	Fort Collins, Colorado	Active	
	**Gamma of South Carolina**	December 5, 1973	Furman University	Greenville, South Carolina	Active	
	**Omega of New York**	1973	Hofstra University	Nassau County, New York	Active	
	**Zeta of Iowa**	December 19, 1973	Iowa State University	Ames, Iowa	Active	
	**Alpha Alpha of New York**	March 7, 1974	University at Albany, SUNY	Albany, New York	Active	
	**Alpha Beta of New York**	May 1974	Stony Brook University	Stony Brook, New York	Active	
	**Beta of Kansas**	February 11, 1974	Kansas State University	Manhattan, Kansas	Active	
	**Epsilon of Texas**	1974	Trinity University	San Antonio, Texas	Active	
	**Eta of Wisconsin**	1974	University of Wisconsin–Milwaukee	Milwaukee, Wisconsin	Active	
	**Mu of California**	1974	University of California, Irvine	Irvine, California	Active	
	**Nu of California**	April 27, 1974	San Diego State University	San Diego, California	Active	
	**Pi of Massachusetts**	May 8, 1974	College of the Holy Cross	Worcester, Massachusetts	Active	
	**Rho of Pennsylvania**	1974	Temple University	Philadelphia, Pennsylvania	Active	
	**Zeta of Minnesota**	April 1974	Hamline University	Saint Paul, Minnesota	Active	
	**Rho of California**	1977	California State University, Long Beach	Long Beach, California	Active	
	**Sigma of California**	May 27, 1977	University of California, San Diego	San Diego, California	Active	
	**Xi of California**	1977	University of Redlands	Redlands, California	Active	
	**Pi of California**	1977	Santa Clara University	Santa Clara, California	Active	
	**Beta of Louisiana**	1977	Louisiana State University	Baton Rouge, Louisiana	Active	
	**Zeta of Texas**	April 12, 1977	Baylor University	Waco, Texas	Active	
	**Beta of Rhode Island**	April 22, 1977	University of Rhode Island	Kingston, Rhode Island	Active	
	**Nu of Ohio**	April 27, 1977	Kent State University	Kent, Ohio	Active	
	**Mu of Virginia**	May 8, 1977	Virginia Tech	Blacksburg, Virginia	Active	
	**Omicron of California**	May 26, 1977	San Francisco State University	San Francisco, California	Active	
	**Iota of Illinois**	June 3, 1977	University of Illinois Chicago	Chicago, Illinois	Active	
	**Gamma of New Jersey**	April 26, 1980	Drew University	Madison, New Jersey	Active	
	**Eta of Michigan**	April 3, 1980	Alma College	Alma, Michigan	Active	
	**Delta of Maryland**	May 1, 1980	McDaniel College	Westminster, Maryland	Active	
	**Gamma of Florida**	November 19, 1982	Stetson University	DeLand, Florida	Active	
	**Tau of California**	1983	Claremont McKenna College	Claremont, California	Active	
	**Eta of Iowa**	April 19, 1983	Luther College	Decorah, Iowa	Active	
	**Delta of Florida**	February 5, 1983	University of Miami	Coral Gables, Florida	Active	
	**Xi of Ohio**	1983	Bowling Green State University	Bowling Green, Ohio	Active	
	**Eta of Minnesota**	April 7, 1983	Gustavus Adolphus College	St. Peter, Minnesota	Active	
	**Upsilon of California**	1986	University of California, Santa Cruz	Santa Cruz, California	Active	
	**Delta of Washington**	April 10, 1986	University of Puget Sound	Tacoma, Washington	Active	
	**Sigma of Pennsylvania**	April 13, 1986	Villanova University	Villanova, Pennsylvania	Active	
	**Eta of Texas**	1989	University of Dallas	Irving, Texas	Active	
	**Alpha of Mississippi**	March 4, 1989	Millsaps College	Jackson, Mississippi	Active	
	**Beta of Oklahoma**	May 4, 1989	University of Tulsa	Tulsa, Oklahoma	Active	
	**Omicron of Ohio**	May 5, 1992	Wittenberg University	Springfield, Ohio	Active	
	**Tau of Pennsylvania**	March 29, 1992	Ursinus College	Springfield, Ohio	Active	
	**Zeta of D.C.**	December 1, 1994	American University	Washington, D.C.	Active	
	**Zeta of Connecticut**	April 4, 1995	Fairfield University	Fairfield, Connecticut	Active	
	**Kappa of Illinois**	1995	Loyola University	Chicago, Illinois	Active	
	**Epsilon of Maryland**	1995	Loyola University Maryland	Baltimore, Maryland	Active	
	**Theta of Texas**	March 25, 1995	Southwestern University	Georgetown, Texas	Active	
	**Zeta of North Carolina**	April 17, 1995	North Carolina State University	Raleigh, North Carolina	Active	
	**Upsilon of Pennsylvania**	April 30, 1995	Carnegie Mellon University	Pittsburgh, Pennsylvania	Active	
	**Delta of Oregon**	February 1, 1998	Willamette University	Salem, Oregon	Active	
	**Beta of Arkansas**	April 15, 1998	Hendrix College	Conway, Arkansas	Active	
	**Gamma of Oregon**	1998	Lewis & Clark College	Portland, Oregon	Active	
	**Zeta of Maryland**	April 22, 1998	St. Mary's College of Maryland	St. Mary's City, Maryland	Active	
	**Eta of Maryland**	March 16, 1998	University of Maryland, Baltimore County	Catonsville, Maryland	Active	
	**Epsilon of Georgia**	February 10, 1998	Spelman College	Atlanta, Georgia	Active	
	**Theta of Michigan**	February 22, 1998	Western Michigan University	Kalamazoo, Michigan	Active	
	**Lambda of Illinois**	February 21, 2001	Illinois Wesleyan University	Bloomington, Illinois	Active	
	**Gamma of Alabama**	March 22, 2001	Auburn University	Auburn, Alabama	Active	
	**Iota of Texas**	March 30, 2001	Austin College	Sherman, Texas	Active	
	**Epsilon of Florida**	April 1, 2001	Florida International University	University Park, Florida	Active	
	**Beta of Mississippi**	April 6, 2001	University of Mississippi	Oxford, Mississippi	Active	
	**Phi of Pennsylvania**	2001	Saint Joseph's University	Philadelphia, Pennsylvania	Active	
	**Delta of Missouri**	January 31, 2001	Truman State University	Kirksville, Missouri	Active	
263	**Phi of California**	November 14, 2003	University of San Diego	San Diego, California	Active	
264	**Alpha Delta of New York**	January 16, 2004	State University of New York at Geneseo	Geneseo, New York	Active	
265	**Kappa of Texas**	February 17, 2004	Texas A&M University	College Station, Texas	Active	
266	**Zeta of Florida**	February 27, 2004	Eckerd College	St. Petersburg, Florida	Active	
267	**Nu of Virginia**	March 12, 2004	Roanoke College	Salem, Virginia	Active	
268	**Alpha Gamma of New York**	March 19, 2004	Alfred University	Alfred, New York	Active	
269	**Eta of Indiana**	April 1, 2004	Valparaiso University	Valparaiso, Indiana	Active	
270	**Gamma of Vermont**	April 16, 2004	Saint Michael's College	Colchester, Vermont	Active	
271	**Theta of Maryland**	February 23, 2007	Washington College	Chestertown, Maryland	Active	
272	**Chi of California**	March 31, 2007	University of the Pacific	Stockton, California	Active	
273	**Delta of South Carolina**	April 2, 2007	Clemson University	Clemson, South Carolina	Active	
274	**Delta of New Jersey**	April 9, 2007	The College of New Jersey	Ewing Township, New Jersey	Active	
275	**Lambda of Texas**	April 11, 2007	Texas Tech University	Lubbock, Texas	Active	
276	**Pi of Ohio**	April 22, 2007	Xavier University	Cincinnati, Ohio	Active	
277	**Theta of Indiana**	February 4, 2010	Butler University	Indianapolis, Indiana	Active	
278	**Xi of Virginia**	March 17, 2010	James Madison University	Harrisonburg, Virginia	Active	
279	**Eta of North Carolina**	April 13, 2010	Elon University	Elon, North Carolina	Active	
280	**Theta of Minnesota**	April 27, 2010	College of Saint Benedict and Saint John's University	Collegeville Township and St. Joseph, Minnesota	Active	
281	**Beta of Nebraska**	November 29, 2012	Creighton University	Omaha, Nebraska	Active	
282	**Gamma of Oklahoma**	January 17, 2013	Oklahoma State University	Stillwater, Oklahoma	Active	
283	**Omicron of Virginia**	April 17, 2013	George Mason University	Fairfax, Virginia	Active	
284	**Mu of Texas**	March 4, 2016	University of Houston	Houston, Texas	Active	
285	**Zeta of Georgia**	April 9, 2016	Mercer University	Macon, Georgia	Active	
286	**Epsilon of Oregon**	April 28, 2016	Oregon State University	Corvallis, Oregon	Active	
287	**Gamma of Mississippi**	April 2, 2019	Mississippi State University	Starkville, Mississippi	Active	
288	**Omega of California**	April 4, 2019	Loyola Marymount University	Los Angeles, California	Active	
289	**Psi of California**	April 18, 2019	Chapman University	Orange, California	Active	
290	**Eta of Florida**	April 22, 2019	University of South Florida	Tampa, Florida	Active	
291	**Theta of Florida**	March 4, 2022	Rollins College	Winter Park, Florida	Active	
292	**Theta of North Carolina**	April 20, 2022	University of North Carolina at Charlotte	Charlotte, North Carolina	Active	
293	**Gamma of Rhode Island**	April 26, 2022	Providence College	Providence, Rhode Island	Active	

== See also ==
- Honor Society
- List of college literary societies
- List of Phi Beta Kappa members
