= Oklahoma Center for the Advancement of Science and Technology =

- Great Seal of Oklahoma

Agency overview
- Formed: 1987
- Headquarters: 755 Research Parkway; Oklahoma City, Oklahoma
- Employees: 15
- Annual budget: $13.4 million
- Agency executives: Oklahoma Secretary of Science and Technology; C. Michael Carolina, Executive Director
- Website: Oklahoma Center for the Advancement of Science and Technology

The Oklahoma Center for the Advancement of Science and Technology (OCAST) is the agency of the government of Oklahoma that is responsible for technology-based economic development. Under the supervision of the Oklahoma Secretary of Science and Innovation, OCAST is responsible for fostering innovation in existing and developing business by supporting basic and applied research. The center is led by 21-member Board of Directors, each either appointed by the Governor of Oklahoma, with the approval of the Oklahoma Senate, or ex officio members.

The current Cabinet Secretary is Kayse Shrum, who was appointed by Governor Kevin Stitt in March 2019. Under the Secretary's supervision, the center's executive director is responsible for the day-to-day administration of the Center's programs.

The center was created in 1987 during the term of Governor Henry Bellmon.

== Leadership ==
The center is overseen by the Oklahoma Secretary of Science and Innovation.

=== Board of directors ===
OCAST is governed by the Oklahoma Science and Technology Research and Development (OSTRaD) Board of Directors (Title 74, Section 5060.6). This 9-member board of directors consists of the State Secretary of Science and Innovation as the OSTRaD board chair with four members appointed by the governor and two each by the state senate and house.

As of June 2026, the following are the current members of the Board:

- Deborah Moorad - Chair, Secretary of Commerce
- Blayne Arthur - Secretary of Agriculture
- Mita Bates - Principal, MAB Advisory LLC
- Thomas Kupiec - ARL / DNA Solutions / Kupiec Group
- Dan Marticello - CymSTAR, Broken Arrow
- Chris Schinnerer - Deputy Secretary of Energy and Environment
- Brenda Rolls - Frontier Electronic Systems
- Kenneth Sewell - Oklahoma State University
- Bob Warwick - Former President and CEO of Crossroads Counseling & Consultation

== Organization ==
- Cabinet Secretary
- Board of Directors
  - Executive Director
    - Director
      - Programs Division
      - Administration and Finance Division
      - Technology Information Services Division

== Programs ==
The center offers numerous programs to assist the development of the state's economy:

- Research Funding Programs
  - Oklahoma Health Research program
    - Health Research Postdoctoral Fellowship program
  - Oklahoma Applied Research Support program
    - Faculty and Student Intern Partnerships program
  - Oklahoma Plant Science (Basic) Program
- Business Assistance Programs
  - Inventors Assistance Service
  - Oklahoma Manufacturing Alliance
  - Small Business Innovation Research/Small Business Technology Transfer program
  - Oklahoma Seed Capital Fund
  - Technology Business Finance Program
  - innovation to Enterprise (i2E)

== Supporting agencies ==
- Oklahoma Applied Research Committee
- Oklahoma Health Research Committee
- Oklahoma Plant Sciences Research Advisory Committee
- Seed Capital Investment Committee
- Small Business Research Assistance Committee
- Oklahoma Science and Technology Research and Development Board
