= Edmon =

Edmon is a given name. Notable people with the name include:

- Arthur Edmon Brown, Jr., United States Army four-star general, Vice Chief of Staff of the United States Army (VCSA) from 1987 to 1989
- Edmon Colomer, Spanish conductor from Barcelona
- Isidore Louis Bernard Edmon van Dommelen, known as Lou Tellegen (1881–1934), Dutch-born stage and film actor, film director and screenwriter
- Edmon Low (1902–1983), the head librarian of the Oklahoma State University Library from 1940 to 1967
- Edmon Marukyan, Armenian lawyer, Member of National Assembly, elected three times
- Edmon López Möller, (born 1996), professional squash player who represents Spain
- Edmon Ryan (1905–1984), American theatre, film, and television actor
- Edmon Shehadeh, Palestinian poet and literary

== See also ==
- Edmon Low Library (ELL), the main library of the Oklahoma State University System
