= Edmon Low =

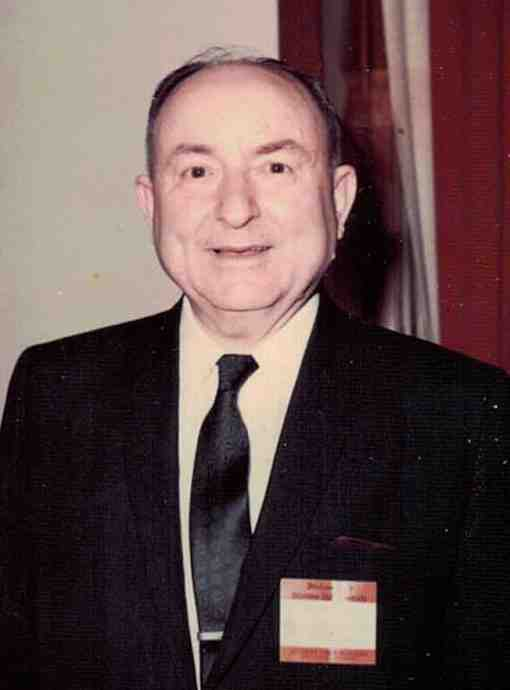
- Born: Edmon Low; January 4, 1902; Kiowa Indian Territory
- Died: December 2, 1983 (aged 81); Tulsa, OK
- Known for: Head librarian of the Oklahoma State University Library 1940-1967
- Spouse: Mayme Low
- Children: Frances Low Finch, Marc Low, and Donald Low

Edmon Low (January 4, 1902 – December 2, 1983) was the head librarian of the Oklahoma State University Library from 1940–1967. His service in this position is the longest to date. During his time at Oklahoma State, Low was strongly involved with the construction of the present Edmon Low Library building, the main library of the Oklahoma State University System, named after his contributions to the university. Low was instrumental in having the library staff elevated to faculty status at OSU. One of Low's more notable contributions to the library system was his development of the open stack approach in library service.

== Early life ==
Edmon Low was born in 1902, before Oklahoma had been granted statehood, to Foster Lafayette Low & Katherine Horton Low in Kiowa Indian Territory. He had one brother, Lee, and graduated from high school in 1920 in Tishomingo, OK. Upon graduation from high school, Low worked at a bank for a short time before enrolling at East Central State College in Ada, OK.

== Education ==
While attending East Central State College, Low worked in the campus library for a small wage while pursuing his degree in mathematics. He first desired to work in the banking profession upon graduation but his job at the library inspired him to pursue a career in professional librarianship. He graduated from East Central in 1926. For three years after graduation, Low served as the assistant librarian at East Central State College until 1929 when he enrolled at the University of Illinois. There he completed his degree in library sciences in a year. Post graduation, he returned to his job in Ada, OK and served in that position for seven years, during which he was married to Mayme Low and had three children: Frances, Marc, and Don. In 1937, after saving up enough money during the Depression, the Lows moved to Michigan where Edmon enrolled at the University of Michigan to receive his master's degree in 1938.

== Career ==
Though he intended to return to his position at East Central State College, Low accepted a job at Bowling Green State University in Ohio in 1938. He served there for two years, bringing order and innovative methods to their library. In 1940, Low applied for an opening at Oklahoma A.and M.(now Oklahoma State University) where he was soon accepted. That fall when he began working at Oklahoma A.and M., Low directed a staff of 15 professional librarians. Befriending current university president Henry G. Bennett, the two men worked together to drastically improve the campus, specifically with discussion of a new library building. Bennett knew the importance of a library in one's education. When speaking at the opening of a public library he stated, "Here one may sit awhile with the great minds of all places and all times .... We may walk and talk with the wise men of all races and all ages. We may view the stirring panorama of human striving that we call history .... Whatever our interest, whatever our mood, we shall find here its counterpart and its minister." Though he shared in the planning of the library's expansion with Low, Bennett died in a plane crash before he could see the realization of their planning. While at Oklahoma A. and M., Low inspired a number of changes in the library system and realized Bennett's dream to transform the Oklahoma Aggies into a major institution. After his retirement at OSU in 1967, Low returned to University of Michigan where he taught full-time for several more years. After his retirement from Michigan, Low and his wife moved to head the library at New College of Florida in Sarasota, FL.

=== Construction/expansion setbacks of new library building ===
The new larger library was planned as early as 1928, but suffered many financial setbacks. In 1941, the chairman of the senate appropriations committee called for funding for a new library building, referring to their current one as a "firetrap." Although money was allocated for the funding of a new library with the passing of a bill, wartime expenditures put the construction on hold yet again. During the war, Low put himself in charge of the "War information center," housed on campus. Oklahoma A. and M.'s information center was one of 140 centers kept on college campuses. After WWII, Quonset huts were erected to house certain parts of library collections as well as provide study space for 500 students. The final selected site for the construction of the library brought with it its own adversity. The construction was set back another two years due to Stillwater merchant's efforts to prevent the college from ending a major city street that went through campus. After many years of frustration, the groundbreaking ceremony was held on May 28, 1950. The building's dedication took place in May 1953.

=== Low's changes to library system ===
Low was instrumental in many changes to the library system. He is most well known for pioneering the open stack concept, one that he put into use at Oklahoma State. While at Oklahoma A. and M. Low was responsible for elevating the library staff to faculty rank, as well as developing a new system for checking out books that was utilized until computerization. Upon his arrival at the developing university, more staff members attended and held membership in the national association of librarians than was done in previous years.

== Retirement ==
Low did not retire completely, but instead took up congressional lobbying while in his 70s living in Florida. He would commute to Washington D.C. for this purpose from his home in Sarasota. Some of that legislation included helping to pass a bill that gave federal money to libraries. Finally, Low was forced to retire due to health complications and the onset of Alzheimer's disease in Mayme. The class of 1972 at the University of Michigan established the Edmon Low Award in honor of the professor upon his retirement. Low died in 1983 in Tulsa, OK and is buried in Stillwater, OK.

== Achievements ==
- Distinguished Alumni for East Central and University of Michigan
- Present for Edmon Low Library's 1 millionth volume: a replica of the Gutenberg Bible
- Joseph W. Lippincott Award, American Library Association, 1967.
- American Library Association Honorary Membership 1976.
- Named president of Association of College and Research Libraries-ACRL (1959)
- Omicron Delta Kappa spring Achievement Award (1967)

== Bibliography ==
- Low, Edmon (August 1972). "Federal Consciousness and Libraries". American Libraries. Vol. 3, no. 7. pp. 717–724.
- Low, Edmon (1966). "The Impact Of Federal Legislation On Academic Libraries". Allerton Park Institute (13th: 1966). Allerton Park Institute. hdl:2142/1531.
- Low, Edmon (June 9, 1938). A survey of the teachers college libraries of Michigan. University of Michigan. OCLC 38344602.
