= Kenneth Heidrich =

American architect

Kenneth J. Heidrich (1907–1980) was an American architect, primarily active in Pennsylvania. He specialized in school and residential architecture in Central and Western Pennsylvania as well as Ohio. In addition to K-12 school architecture, he maintained an interest in architectural education. Heidrich’s 1946 McCormick House, was one of a small number of modern designs at that time in State College, Pennsylvania. He was a proponent of the architect-designed small home, rather than mass produced plans and houses.

== Early life ==
Heidrich was born on October 7, 1907, in Elyria, Ohio, the son of Henry and Gertrude Smith Heidrich. In 1930, he received a Bachelor of Architecture degree from Carnegie Institute of Technology (now Carnegie Mellon University). Heidrich also received a diploma from Fontainebleau School of Fine Arts in France after accepting a scholarship to attend. A Master of Fine Arts degree followed in 1937 from Princeton University, where he held a Palmer Fellowship in 1936.

== Teaching and research ==
Heidrich started his teaching career at Oklahoma State University in 1930. He was an assistant professor of architecture at the School of Engineering at Oklahoma State, until he began teaching at Pennsylvania State University in 1937. At the 1947 meeting of the Association of Collegiate Schools of Architecture, he argued for the inclusion of building regulations, introductory engineering, and materials research in the drawing classes of architecture schools to complement design instruction. As chairman of the Committee on Visual Education within the Association of Collegiate Schools of Architecture, he led an effort to establish a cooperative program to provide color slides of structures and products to departments for lectures and study.

== Design career ==
Heidrich received three medals for his work from the Beaux-Arts Institute of Design. He won a First Medal at the 27th Paris Prize Competition for the project “An International Athletic Centre” while student at Carnegie Institute of Technology under the mentorship of the École des Beaux-Arts educated Camille E. Grapin. Heidrich received two Second Medal prizes while working at the Oklahoma Agricultural & Mechanical College. The first in 1931 for “A Circular Greek Temple” in the “Class ‘A & B’ Archaeology VI Projet” category. The next year his gothic revival design for “A Small Chapel for a Private House” placed in the “Interior Design IV” category.

Heidrich left Penn State to open a private practice in 1950, but he rejoined the faculty in 1962-1963. He founded Heidrich and Risheberger Associates with Jack Risheberger. The firm focused on school architecture. Heidrich and Risheberger designed the buildings of Radio Park Elementary School, Westerly Parkway Junior High School and State College Senior High School.

During World War II he worked for Carl N. Norden Company, which produced the Norden Bombsight. There he led a department designing technical manuals.

== Key designs ==
School architecture:

- Radio Park Elementary School, State College, PA, 1962
- State College Sr. High School, State College, PA, 1957
- Houserville Elementary School, State College, PA, 1958
- Westerly Parkway Jr. High School, State College, PA, 1961

Residential architecture:

- The Heidrich House I, State College, PA, 1939
- The McCormick House, State College, PA, 1946
- The Boucher House, State College, PA, 1956
- James B. Smith House II, State College, PA, 1974
