= Eskimo Joe's =

- Eskimo Joe's Sign
- Interactive map of Eskimo Joe's

Restaurant information
- Established: July 21, 1975
- Owner: Stan Clark
- Location: 501 W. Elm Street, Stillwater, Oklahoma, 74074, United States
- Coordinates: 36.12191°N 97.06419°W
- Reservations: No
- Website: Eskimo Joe's

Eskimo Joe's is a restaurant and bar located at 501 W. Elm in Stillwater, Oklahoma.

== History ==
Eskimo Joe's was opened by Steve File (who came up with the name) and Stan Clark (who later purchased File's interest and became sole owner), two graduates of nearby Oklahoma State University (OSU), on July 21, 1975. Originally, Eskimo Joe's was only a bar, but when the drinking age was raised from 18 to 21 in 1984, the business became a restaurant as well. The name came from the desire to express that Eskimo Joe's had the coldest beer in town.

The restaurant, also called "Stillwater's Jumpin' Little Juke Joint," occupies a two story building with a unique atrium dubbed the "Joe Dome" featuring a retractable glass roof, built in 1992. Eskimo Joe's is a popular hang-out for OSU students and is located across the street from the main campus. It is an extended part of "The Strip," a hang-out zone of bars centered on Washington Street, and often features concerts and other late-night attractions for the college drinking scene, such as Ladies Night or Coin Beer. In early 2003 Eskimo Joe's started a "Thirsty Thursday" promotion that charged a $5 cover and gave patrons all the domestic beer they cared to drink. This promotion has since changed to "bottomless bottles."

== Media references ==
In the season 9 episode 12 of the ABC sitcom The Middle titled "The Other Man", the character Brad mentioned to Sue at the 18 minute mark that he and Luke went down the street to Eskimo Joe's. The scene was set where Sue attends college which was in Indiana.

In 2005, Sports Illustrated's on-line magazine, SI on Campus, named Eskimo Joe's the third best collegiate sports bar in the U.S.

In 1990, during his commencement speech, President George H. W. Bush endorsed Eskimo Joe's cheese fries. In 2006, during his commencement speech, President George W. Bush followed his father's footsteps and also mentioned both the restaurant and the cheese fries.

Eskimo Joe's is referenced in season 1 episode 2 of the animated sitcom The Oblongs.

== Merchandise and mascots ==
Eskimo Joe's is also famous for its branded merchandise. The Eskimo Joe logo, featuring the smiling cartoon Eskimo Joe and his slobbering canine friend Buffy, was created in 1975 by a freshman art student at OSU, Bill Thompson. The company runs a retail outlet connected to the restaurant in Stillwater, as well as a location in Tulsa, and mail-order and online catalog businesses; around the Christmas season, several temporary stores open in malls in cities around the state.

== Restaurants ==
Eskimo Joe's is part of a chain of themed restaurants, all owned by Clark, that used to be called the "Three Amigos." In 1984, Stillwater Bay Oyster Company, a more upscale seafood and steak restaurant, opened, and in 1987, Mexico Joe's rounded out the trio. In 2000, Joseppi's, an Italian-themed restaurant, opened down the street from the relocated Mexico Joe's. The two buildings share the same antique-looking architecture and intricate interior design, and the restaurants share the same price bracket, slightly higher than the burgers and fries of Eskimo Joe's. For a brief time, the four Stan Clark restaurants were referred to as the "Fab Four" but Stillwater Bay (as its name had been shortened to by then) closed in 2005, returning the chain to the "Three Amigos" once more.

Joseppi's closed on May 24, 2014. In 2015, the building was converted to MoJo’s Rock’n’Bowl Grill, a sports bar offering American fare and a bowling alley. MoJo's closed in January 2018.

The other restaurants feature mascots – Mexico Joe's is a sombrero and poncho wearing Joe with a donkey (Bucky); Joseppi's is Joe with a twirly Sicilian mustache and chef outfit accompanied by a monkey (Peppino). However, neither version is as popular as Eskimo Joe and Buffy.

The restaurant was mentioned by Jimmy Fallon on October 6, 2009, after visiting the establishment for Orange Peel 2009.

It was mentioned again on The Late Show With Stephen Colbert in 2018 in a segment done with native Stillwater actor James Marsden.
