= Edmon Low Library =

Coordinates: 36°07′23″N 97°04′11″W

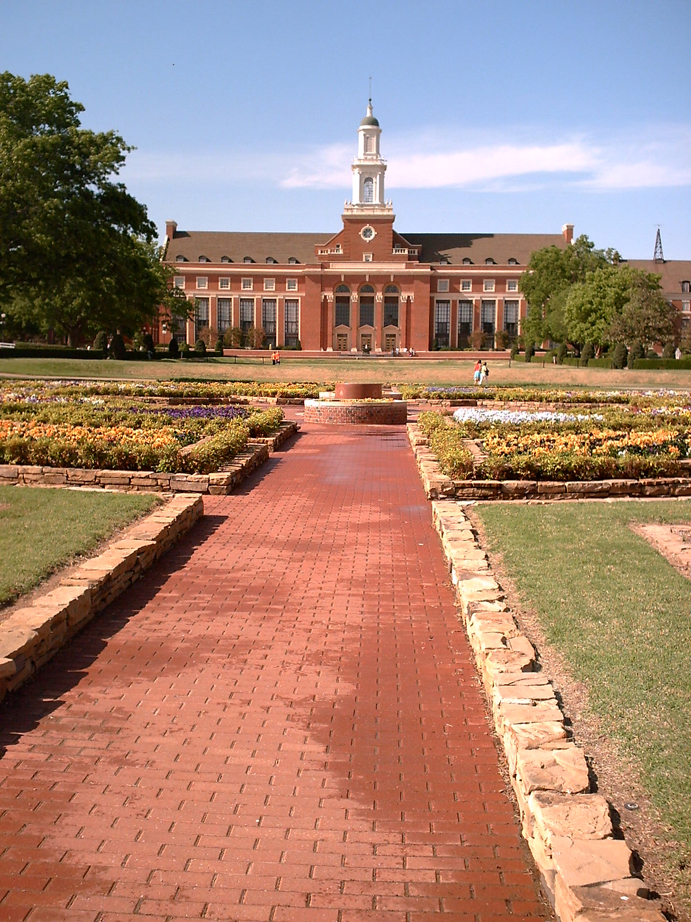
Edmon Low Library

The Edmon Low Library (ELL) is the main library of the Oklahoma State University System. It is located on the main campus of the university in Stillwater, Oklahoma.

The library holds more than 3 million volumes, and offers Internet access to online users through its expanded website and web-based catalog.

Established in 1953, the Edmon Low Library is named after Edmon Low, a former university librarian who served until his retirement in 1967. Low worked with OSU president Henry G. Bennett to build a new library building, one that would become the center of the Oklahoma State University campus following the completion of Bennett's Twenty-Five Year Plan.

== History ==
Though the Edmon Low Library building has only been on the campus of OSU - Stillwater since 1953, OSU has had a library since the establishment of the school in 1890. For many years the library collection was housed in various homes and offices of the university faculty. In 1894, the library found its first official home in Old Central. The library shared a single room with the English department.

Seven years later, the library was moved into a room on the first floor of the newly completed Williams Building. Its 1,610 square feet (150 m^{2}) seemed spacious at the time. The Williams Building was one of the first structures on campus to have electricity, giving students the opportunity to now study in the evening. In 1921, the first building devoted solely to the library was completed. It was simply called the Library Building and was located south of what is now Gundersen Hall.

President Henry G. Bennett came to campus in 1928 and developed his Twenty-Five Year Plan for campus development. The plan called for the campus to center around a new library. President Bennett worked closely with then-Library Director Edmon Low to make the plans for the new Library a reality. The pair toured other university libraries and reviewed plans for the new building as it developed. Rumors state that the two were still moving markers in the middle of the night before the ground breaking in 1950. In 1953, the Edmon Low Library, with its elegant Georgian style, opened and quickly became a focal point for campus pride.

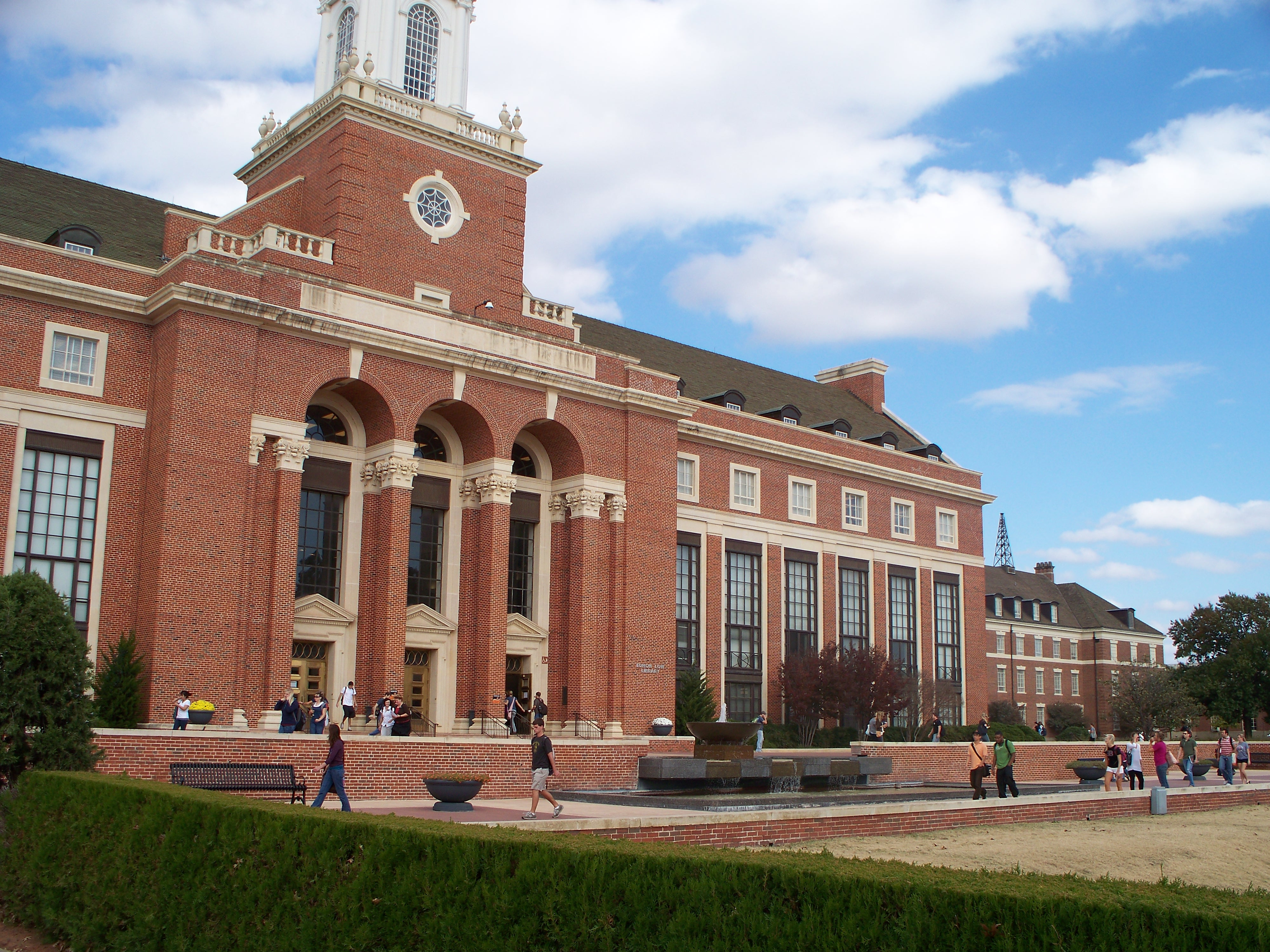
Edmon Low Library during the Fall 2008 Semester

Upon his retirement in 1967, Edmon Low was succeeded by Roscoe Rouse, Jr. as OSU librarian. Rouse brought years of experience in library administration to OSU. He is best known for bringing mechanization of library routines and information services to the library. He is also the author of A History of the Oklahoma State University Library for the OSU Centennial History Series.

Edward R. Johnson became dean of libraries in 1987 and ushered the library into the electronic age. One of the first milestones was the implementation of PETE, the library's first online information system. It provided information about the library's 1.7 million volumes and became more comprehensive with the addition of new databases. Today, the library provides Internet access to its users through an expanded web site and the new, web-based catalog. The library will be the first academic library in North America to use the Aquabrowser search front-end. Aquabrowser allows the user to "Search, Discover, and Refine" through advanced features such as the 'Word cloud'. The Oklahoma State University calls their Aquabrowser interface B.O.S.S, the Big Orange Search System.

Edmon Low Library is staffed by more than 200 faculty, staff and students who serve the needs of the campus community. The Edmon Low Library has six floors and currently holds over 2.5 million volumes.
