= Gift of a Lifetime =

Gift of a Lifetime is a canceled charity program at Oklahoma State University using life insurance on senior-aged alumni. Announced in 2007, the university's athletic department purchased 27 policies using nearly $20 million in premium dollars to Lincoln National Life Insurance Company. By the program's end, OSU Athletics Inc. had spent $33 million. Laws regarding insurance policies for charities required the university's athletic department, not the donors of the policies, to hold the rights of ownership. This prevented the donors from changing the beneficiary, and also avoided any possible tax consequences.

== Background ==
On March 1, 2007, Oklahoma State University announced it secured a life insurance policy program titled "Gift of a Lifetime," which worked with the OSU Foundation and OSU Athletics Inc. to buy life insurance on its wealthiest alumni. OSU Athletics Inc. was formerly titled "OSU Cowboy Golf" and its board members included influential booster T. Boone Pickens, who gave $165 million to OSU Athletics in January 2006, the largest gift in National Collegiate Athletic Association history. The athletic department credited Pickens with devising the idea.

The Oklahoman reported Athletic Director Mike Holder, the former golf coach and chairman of OSU Cowboy Golf, "devised the cutting edge method to raise funds" on the advice of Pickens, one of the 400 richest people in the world (according to Forbes Magazine). The Los Angeles Times reported that Pickens came up with the program idea after a doctor gave him a physical and said he was insurable for life insurance. Pickens told Playboy magazine in the January 2007 issue, "I took this physical, and my doctor called and said, 'I've got good news and bad news.' He said, 'You're going to live to be 114, but you won't be able to hear or see.'"

All 27 donors in Gift of a Lifetime are alumni required to pass a physical.

The average premium was an estimated $357,000 paid by OSU, and each policy returned $10 million upon each person's death. Larry Reece, the executive for major gifts and development at OSU, told the Associated Press that "most of the 25 in the initial pool are donors and season ticket holders. All were between the ages of 65 and 85."

"To a layperson like myself, it's amazing insurance companies make money on this, too, but they know their business," Reece told The Oklahoman.

The beneficiary initially mentioned was OSU's athletic department, but OSU Communications indicated from the beginning that the foundation intended to expand the program for academics.

Management Compensation Group in Dallas, Texas, approached OSU with the program. John Ridings Lee, the company's executive, said the company was meeting with other colleges to establish similar programs, according to The Chronicle for Higher Education.

A statute in Oklahoma allowed the program to exist. Under Title 36, Chapter 1, Article 36, Sec. 3604, part A, 1: "Any individual of competent legal capacity may procure or effect an insurable contract upon his own life or body for the benefit of any person." In part D, the statute states: "Life insurance contracts may be entered into in which the person paying the consideration for the insurance has no insurable interest in the life of the individual insured, where charitable, benevolent, educational or religious institutions, or their agencies, are designated as the beneficiaries thereof. In no event shall an individual be named as a beneficiary."

Another legal aspect to the program was Oklahoma State House Bill 1384, which grants universities the right to keep all donor information confidential. The OSU Foundation worked with the University of Oklahoma and Mark Thomas, president of the Oklahoma Press Association, to craft the legislation presented to the state house by Rep. Terry Ingmire, R-Stillwater (Okla.). Joey Senat, the state's Freedom of Information director, was against the bill, saying secrecy could lead to corruption, perhaps not with "Gift of a Lifetime," but other donations for the state's institutions of higher education.

== Controversy ==
Lionel Raff, OSU Regents professor, said "The comments I've heard range from morally bankrupt to outrageous," according to The Los Angeles Times. "It's totally inappropriate for any organization to be betting on how long its alumni will live."

In the same Times article, "Robert Lew, a life insurance agent in San Francisco who regularly looks at new insurance programs, questions whether [OSU] will get the financial windfall it expects because of the cost of borrowing the money to buy the policies and because the donors might live a long time. His studies of somewhat similar investment programs suggest that 'the money just ain't going to be there.'"

U.S. Sen. Chuck Grassley, R-Iowa, issued a press release on April 4, 2007, to include the program into an inquiry regarding tax exemptions for universities. The Congressional Quarterly reported that Grassley wanted to know more about the program.

== Program cancellation and lawsuits ==
As of February 2010, OSU and Lincoln National had filed suits against each other. The OSU suit claimed Lincoln National's agents lied and misrepresented the plan and its costs. Lincoln National's lawsuit was filed against Boone Pickens, claiming he was responsible for urging the OSU to cancel the policies. On March 9, 2012, the federal judge overseeing the lawsuit between OSU and Lincoln National sided with Lincoln National in its case with OSU.
