= Gundersen Hall =

Coordinates: 36°7′17″N 97°4′2″W

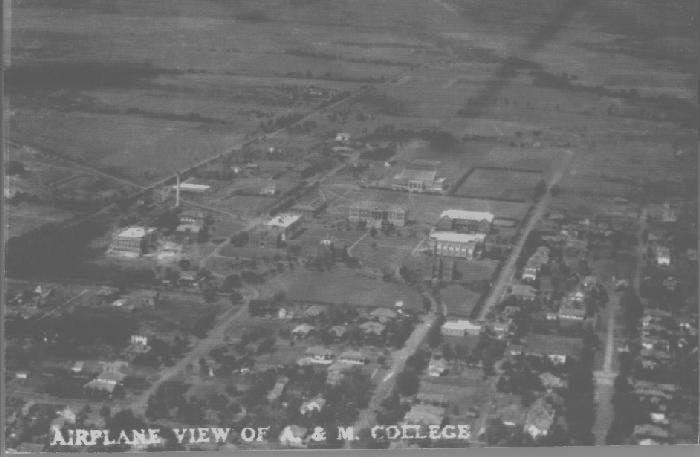
1919 photo

Gundersen Hall is a building located on the main campus of Oklahoma State University in Stillwater, Oklahoma. Construction on the facility began in the fall of 1911, after funds for the building were allocated by legislators. The old boiler house and shop buildings that existed at the site were torn down to make space for the new building. The new building was completed in November 1912, with rooms for laboratories, offices, drafting rooms, and classrooms. Originally designed for engineering students, the building now holds faculty offices, computer labs, and is the home of Online Learning for the Spears School of Business. It also houses a foreign language lab for students.
