= James E. Berry House =

- U.S. National Register of Historic Places
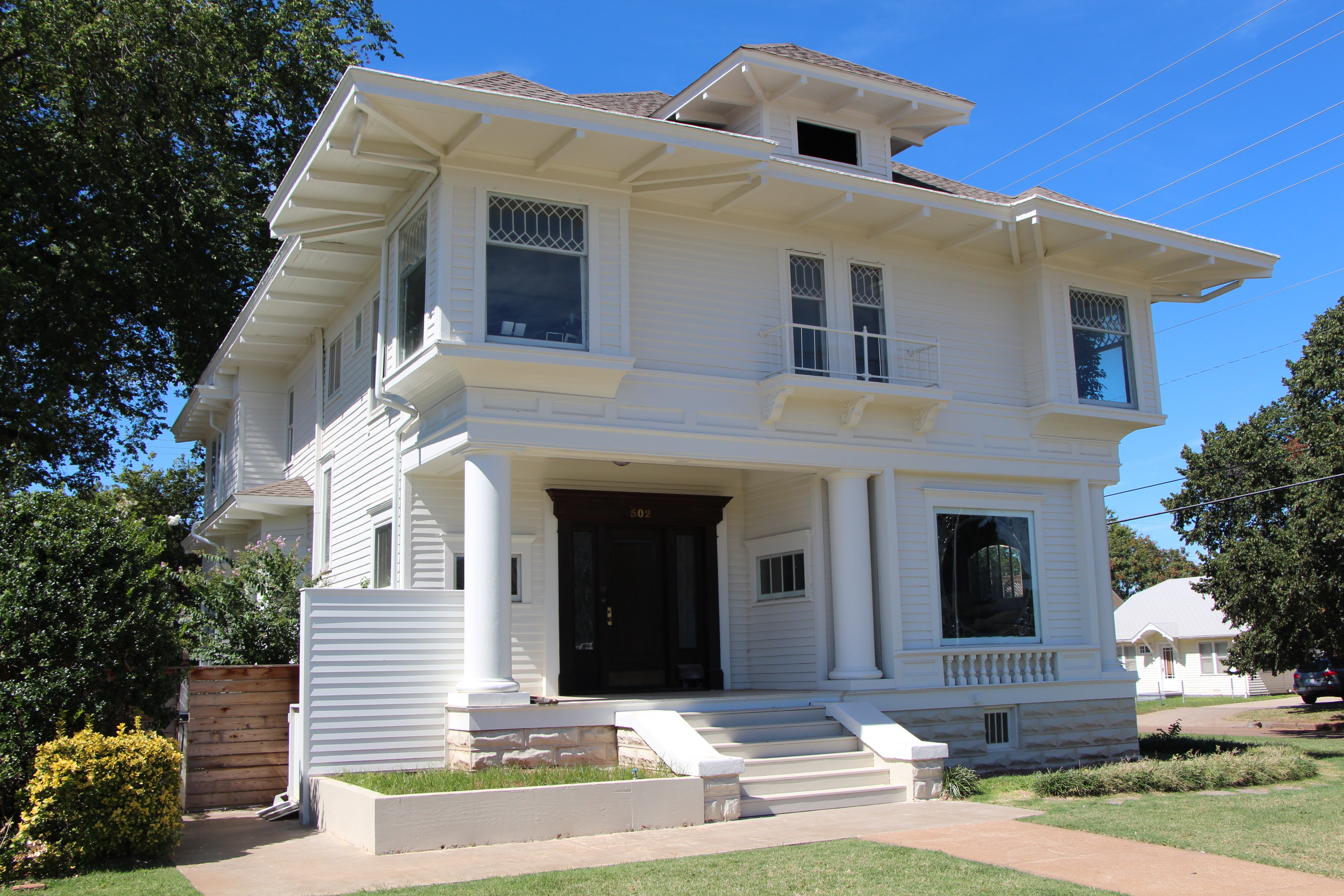

- Location within Oklahoma Location within the United States
- Location: 502 S. Duck St., Stillwater, Payne County, Oklahoma
- Nearest city: Stillwater, Oklahoma
- Coordinates: 36°6′59″N 97°3′44″W
- Area: less than one acre
- Built: 1908
- Architect: Haycraft, Lou
- Architectural style: Queen Anne
- NRHP reference No.: 80003294
- Added to NRHP: November 21, 1980

The James E. Berry Berry House was constructed in 1908. It is significant both because of its association with James E. Berry, Lieutenant Governor of Oklahoma from 1935 to 1955, but also because of its unique architectural style, described as “vaguely Italianate with a Midwestern feeling.”

The Berry House is a two-story rectangular wood frame with lapped wood siding. The front door is flanked by glass sidelights; three Tuscan columns on the front support the upper story. A bay window occurs on each side of the structure. The roof, which is double-hipped, is set off by three low dormers, one on the front and one on each side. The interior has been remodeled only slightly, and includes egg and dart molding, in-laid oak doors, stained glass, and wooden wall paneling.
