= The O'Colly =

Student-run newspaper at Oklahoma State University

- Type: Student newspaper
- School: Oklahoma State University
- Founded: May 1895
- Circulation: 10,000
- Website: ocolly.com

The O'Colly, formerly The Daily O'Collegian, is the student-run newspaper at Oklahoma State University. The O'Colly is published every weekday and distributed for free to OSU students at various points around the campus in Stillwater. The newspaper has been in distribution since May 1895. The O'Colly is ranked as one of the top college newspapers in the country, earning several honors throughout its history and has a circulation of more than 10,000.

== History ==
Though the student-run newspaper at Oklahoma State has been around almost from the beginning, it has not always been published as The Daily O'Collegian. The paper's original name, The College Mirror, was used from 1895 to 1899. The name would then change to The College Paper in 1899, The Orange and Black in 1907, and The O'Collegian in March 1924. In December 1924 The O'Collegian began daily publication, increased its circulation to 2,983, and joined the Associated Press, becoming the fifth college newspaper in the United States to do so. The only other college newspapers holding AP membership at the time were at the University of Illinois, Indiana University, the University of Iowa and Dartmouth College. In 1927, the paper's name was amended a final time, becoming The Daily O'Collegian.

The O'Colly's online edition was launched in 1995.

Starting with the fall 2014 semester, the paper cut Tuesday and Thursday edition and rebranded as The O'Colly with a new tabloid format.

The O'Colly reverted to its original broadsheet format in the fall 2020 semester.

== Awards ==
The O'Colly has received All-America honors, the highest rating given by the Associated Collegiate Press and National Scholastic Press Association, every year since 1989. In 1990, the paper produced the National SPJ Sports Photo of the year, and one of its journalists was recognized as first runner-up for College Journalist of the Year. One photographer received SPJ's Sports Photo of the Year and was a runner-up for News Photo of the Year in 2004. In 1991, The O'Colly produced the National Story of the Year from the Associated Collegiate Press and the Los Angeles Times. Also in 1991, the paper received the Distinguished Newspaper Adviser Award from College Media Advisers Inc. The O'Colly received the National Newspaper Pacemaker Award, often considered the Pulitzer Prize of college journalism, in 1995.

Additionally, the paper has been honored with other awards from the William Randolph Hearst Foundation, Society of Professional Journalists, Southwestern Journalism Congress and Oklahoma City Gridiron.

== Notable alumni ==
- Chester Gould - Created the Dick Tracy strip
- Paul Miller - Helped in the creation of the Gannett media empire; also served as president of the Associated Press
