= OSU Ag Research =

US research facility

Coordinates: 36.12404°N 97.07211°W

OSU Ag Research formerly known as the Oklahoma Agricultural Experiment Station, is a research facility located on the campus of Oklahoma State University–Stillwater (OSU), and part of its Division of Agricultural Sciences and Natural Resources. It conducts research in agriculture, natural resources, rural economies and social issues, and accounts for 37% of the research conducted at OSU.

The station was established by the Hatch Act of 1887.
