= Old Central =

- U.S. National Register of Historic Places
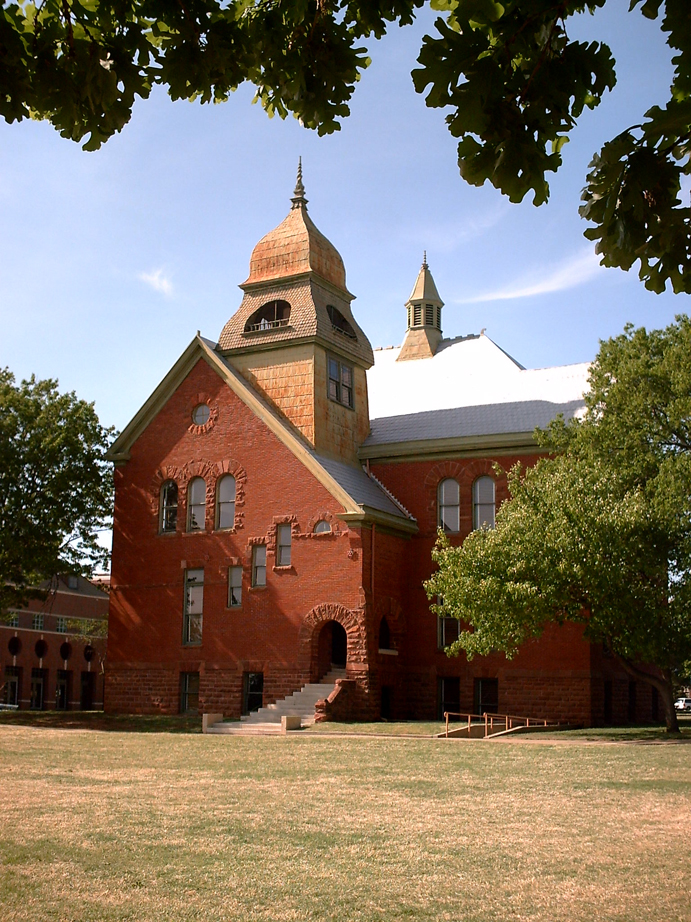
- Oklahoma State University's Old Central

- Location within Oklahoma Location within the United States
- Location: Oklahoma State University campus, Stillwater, Oklahoma
- Nearest city: Stillwater, Oklahoma
- Coordinates: 36°7′14.9874″N 97°3′59.8998″W
- Area: 0.5 acres (0.20 ha)
- Built: 1893-94
- Built by: Henderson Ryan
- Architect: Herman Hadley
- Architectural style: Richardsonian Romanesque
- NRHP reference No.: 71000672
- Added to NRHP: July 27, 1971

Old Central, historically known as the College Building, is the oldest building on the Oklahoma State University campus in Stillwater, Oklahoma. Originally built in 1894, it was the first permanent building on the Oklahoma A&M campus. Old Central's bell clapper once served as a traveling trophy in the Bedlam Series athletics rivalry between Oklahoma State University and the University of Oklahoma. The new "Bedlam Bell" is a crystal trophy modeled after Old Central's bell and is awarded to the winner of each individual athletics contest in addition to the overall series winner for each year.

== History ==
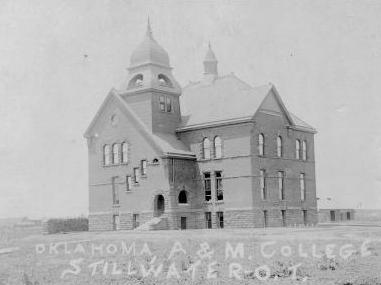
1894 photo of OSU's Old Central.

The construction contract for Old Central was awarded on June 20, 1893. Many students, wanting their own building as soon as possible, assisted the fifty-man construction crew. Students received ten cents per hour for menial jobs, such as carrying bricks and water to the masons.

Dedication ceremonies were held on June 15, 1894. Classes began in the structure on September 15, with 144 students in attendance. The College Building, as it was originally known, was the only permanent campus building until 1900. The Chemistry Department, which had occupied the basement, moved into a new building west of "The College."

Shifting red Permian clay soil and Old Central's native sandstone foundation proved to be an unfortunate combination. The shifting clay movement against the soft sandstone foundation caused serious structural cracks. In 1914 two large tie-rods were installed in an effort to stabilize the building. Condemnation of Old Central became official in 1925, but space on campus was badly needed; so the building continued to be used until early 1927 when falling plaster slightly injured a student.

Major work in 1930 put the building back into use until 1969 when the last regular classes were held. Oklahoma State University leased Old Central to the Oklahoma Historical Society in July 1971; the building was also placed on the National Register of Historic Places. Exterior restoration which began in 1973, was completed in 1989 with the installation of a metal shingle roof to duplicate the original roofing.

On October 10, 2007, a new construction project began that gave the 113-year-old building a $7 million restoration and renovation. Oklahoma state and university officials, including Oklahoma State University System CEO and Interim President Marlene Strathe and Oklahoma Historical Society Executive Director Bob Blackburn, were on hand to ring the Old Central bell to mark the start of construction. The project would give Old Central a new foundation and place students in the building once again. When the renovation was completed in July 2009, the building became the home of the OSU Honors College and continues to house the Oklahoma Museum of Higher Education. The renovation was funded by the Oklahoma State Regents of Higher Education capital lease program.
