= Oklahoma State University =

Public university in Stillwater, Oklahoma, US

- Former names: Oklahoma Agricultural and Mechanical College (1890–1957); Oklahoma State University of Agricultural and Applied Sciences (1957–1980)
- Motto: "Scholarship, Instruction, Service"
- Type: Public land-grant research university
- Established: December 25, 1890; 135 years ago
- Parent institution: Oklahoma State University System
- Accreditation: HLC
- Academic affiliations: ORAU; Space-grant; Sun-grant
- Endowment: $1.565 billion (FY2025) (system-wide)
- Budget: $1.89 billion (FY2026) (system-wide)
- President: Jim Hess
- Academic staff: 1,860 (fall 2024)
- Students: 27,241 (fall 2024)
- Undergraduates: 22,341 (fall 2024)
- Postgraduates: 4,890 (fall 2024)
- Location: Stillwater, Oklahoma, United States; 36.1224°N 97.0698°W
- Campus: 1,489 acres (6.03 km^{2}); Distant town
- Other campuses: Tahlequah; Tulsa; Online
- Newspaper: The O'Colly
- Colors: Orange and black
- Nickname: Cowboys & Cowgirls
- Sporting affiliations: NCAA Division I FBS – Big 12
- Mascot: Pistol Pete
- Website: okstate.edu

Oklahoma State University (informally Oklahoma State or OSU) is a public land-grant research university in Stillwater, Oklahoma, United States.

The university was established in 1890 under the legislation of the Morrill Act. Originally known as Oklahoma Agricultural and Mechanical College (Oklahoma A&M), the Oklahoma State University campus in Stillwater is the flagship institution of the Oklahoma State University System, which enrolls more than 34,000 students across its five institutions with an annual budget of $1.89 billion for fiscal year 2026. As of Fall 2024, 27,241 students are enrolled at the university. OSU is classified among "R1: Doctoral Universities – Very high research activity". According to the National Science Foundation, the university spent $226.5 million on research and development in 2023.

The Oklahoma State Cowboys and Cowgirls have won 57 combined national titles including 55 NCAA team championships, which ranks sixth in most NCAA team national championships after Stanford, UCLA, USC, Texas, and Penn State. As of 2021, Oklahoma State University students and alumni have won 34 Olympic medals (21 gold, 5 silver, and 8 bronze). The university has produced 48 Fulbright Scholars, an astronaut, and a billionaire.

Students spend part of the fall semester preparing for OSU's Homecoming celebration. Starting in 1913, the celebration now draws in more than 40,000 alumni and over 70,000 participants each year to the Stillwater campus. It is billed by the university as "America's Greatest Homecoming Celebration." The Oklahoma State University alumni network exceeds 250,000 graduates.

== History ==
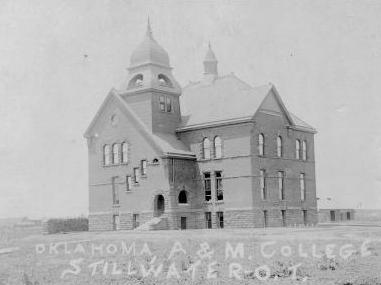
Old Central at Oklahoma A&M, 1894

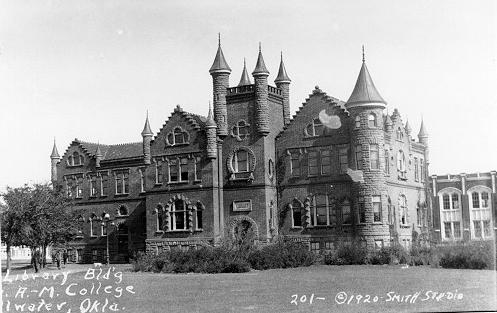
Williams Hall, the Castle of the Prairies, in 1920

On December 25, 1890, the Oklahoma Territorial Legislature approved the Oklahoma Territorial Agricultural and Mechanical (A&M) College, the land-grant institution established under the Morrill Act of 1862. The legislature specified that the college was to be within Payne County. Such an ambiguous description created a rivalry among towns in the county, with Stillwater ultimately gaining the campus. Upon statehood in 1907, "Territorial" was dropped from its title.

Oklahoma A&M seal

The first students assembled for class on December 14, 1891. For two and a half years, classes were held in local churches, until the first academic building, later known as Old Central, was constructed and dedicated on June 15, 1894, on the southeast corner of campus. It was surrounded by a flat plowed prairie.

In 1896, Oklahoma A&M held its first commencement with six male graduates. The first Library was established in Old Central in one room shared with the English Department. The first campus building to have electricity, Williams Hall, was constructed in 1900. Because of its turreted architecture, it was referred to as the "Castle of the Prairies"; It survived until 1969.

One of the earliest campus buildings was also a barn, used as part of an agricultural experiment station, which was served by a large reservoir pond created in 1895. The barn burned down in 1922, but the pond, enlarged and remodeled in 1928 and 1943, is now known as Theta Pond, a popular campus scenic landmark. In 1906, Morrill Hall was completed and became the principal building on campus. A fire gutted the building in 1914, but the outside structure survived intact, and the interior was reconstructed.

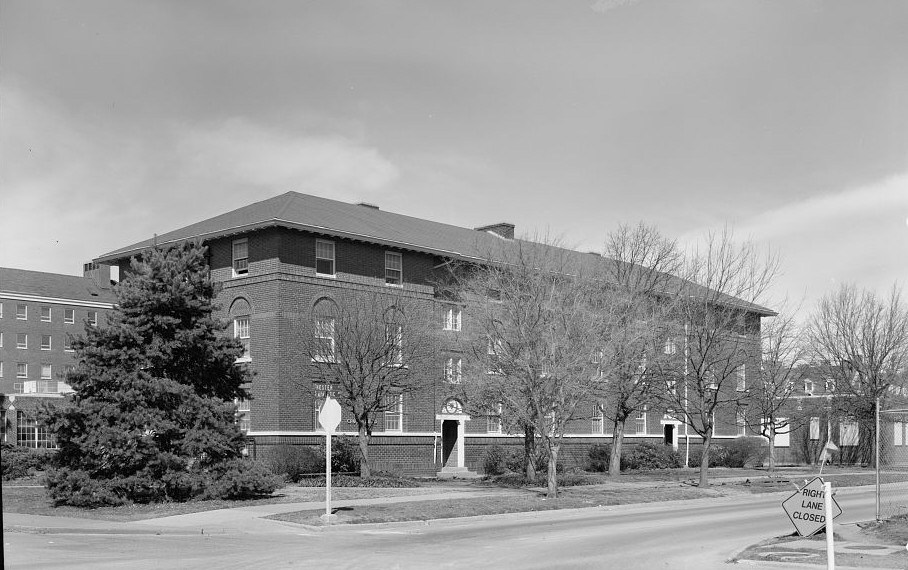
Boy's Dormitory, later Crutchfield Hall. 1933 photo

On-campus housing at Oklahoma A&M College began in 1910, with the opening of the Boys' Dormitory. Later renamed Crutchfield Hall, the Historic American Buildings Survey said it was significant as "... the first permanent boy's dormitory in Oklahoma ... [and] the sole surviving example of a pre-1930 utilitarian dormitory that is characteristic of modified Italian Renaissance Revival architecture". Crutchfield Hall later served the School of Music and the College of Engineering, Architecture, and Technology before it was ranked as outdated and demolished in 1995.

Also opened in 1910 was the Women's Building, a dorm for female students that also contained a dining hall, home economics classes, and a women's gymnasium. It was later named Garner Hall. Today it is known as the Bartlett Center for the Studio Arts and houses the Gardiner Art Gallery.

By 1919 the campus included Morrill Hall, the Central Building, the Engineering Building (now Gundersen Hall), the Women's Building, the Auditorium (replaced later by the Seretean Center for Performing Arts), the Armory-Gymnasium (now the Architecture Building) and the Power Plant.

At the beginning of World War II, Oklahoma A&M was one of six schools selected by the United States Navy to give the Primary School in the Electronics Training Program (ETP), also known as Naval Training School Elementary Electricity and Radio Materiel (NTS EE&RM). Starting in March 1942, each month a new group of 100 Navy students arrived for three months of 14-hour days in concentrated electrical engineering study. Cordell Hall, the newest dormitory, was used for housing and meals; lectures and lab sessions were held in the Engineering Building. Professor Emory B. Phillips was the Director of Instruction. ETP admission required passing the Eddy Test, one of the most selective qualifying exams given during the war years. At a given time, some 500 Navy students were on the campus, a significant fraction of the war-years enrollment. The training activity continued until June 1945 and served a total of about 7,000 students; among these was Robert B. Kamm, a future professor and president of Oklahoma State University.

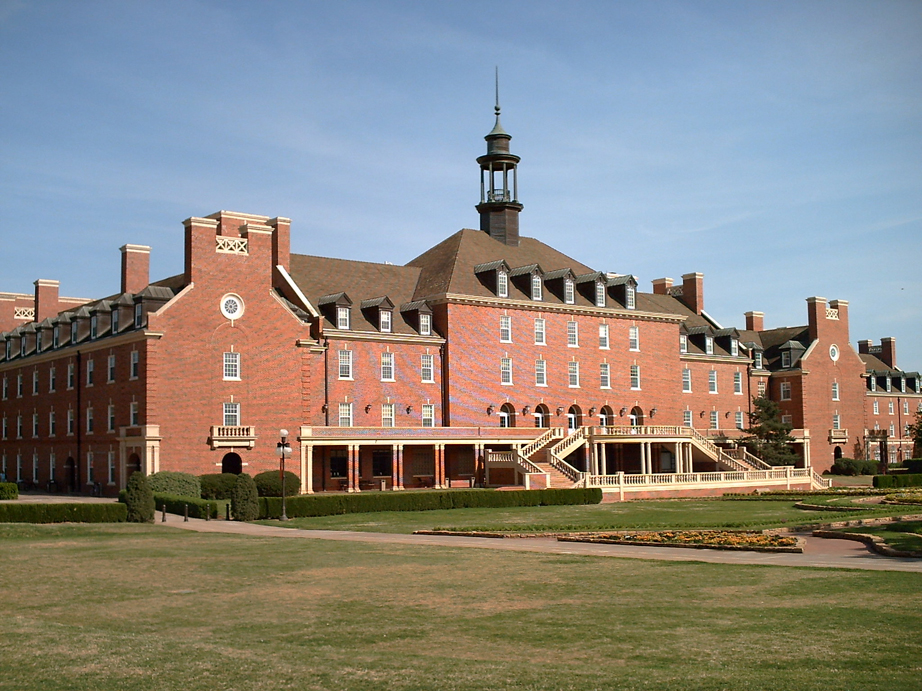
Student Union Building at OSU

Much of the growth of Oklahoma A&M and the architectural integrity of the campus can be attributed to Henry G. Bennett, who served as the school's president from 1928 to 1950. Early in his tenure, Dr. Bennett developed a strategic vision for the university campus's physical expansion. The plan was adopted in 1937, and his vision was followed for more than fifty years, including the predominant Georgian architecture style that permeates the campus. He intended the focal point to be a centrally located library building: this was the Edmon Low Library, which opened in 1953. Another major addition to the campus during the Bennett years was the Student Union, which opened in 1950. Subsequent additions and renovations have made the building one of the largest student union buildings in the world at 611,000 sq ft (56,800 m^{2}).

Oklahoma A&M's global engagement at an institutional level began in the 1950s when President Bennett was appointed in 1950 to be the first director of US President Harry Truman's "Point Four Program", a technical assistance program for developing countries. As part of the Point Four program, Oklahoma A&M College entered into an agreement in 1952 with the government of Ethiopia to establish a technical high school, an agricultural university, and an agricultural extension service there. Faculty and staff from the Stillwater campus traveled to Ethiopia and established Jimma Agricultural Technical School (now Jimma University), the Imperial Ethiopian University of Agriculture and Mechanical Arts (now Haramaya University), and an agricultural and research station at Debra Zeit. In recognition of the contributions of the OSU staff, Ethiopian Emperor Haile Selassie visited the Stillwater campus in 1954, the first foreign head of state to visit Oklahoma and the only one to visit Stillwater.

On May 15, 1957, Oklahoma A&M changed its name to Oklahoma State University of Agricultural and Applied Sciences to reflect the broadening scope of its curriculum. Oklahoma Gov. Raymond Gary signed the bill authorizing the name change passed by the 26th Oklahoma Legislature on May 15, 1957. However, the bill only authorized the Board of Regents to change the college's name, a measure they voted on at their meeting on June 6. However, the name was quickly shortened to Oklahoma State University for most purposes and the "Agricultural & Applied Sciences" name was formally dropped in 1980. Subsequently, the Oklahoma State University System was created, with the Stillwater campus as the flagship institution and several outlying branches: OSU-Institute of Technology in Okmulgee (1946), OSU-Oklahoma City (1961), OSU-Tulsa (1984), and the Center for Health Sciences also in Tulsa (1988).

In 2005, OSU announced its "Campus Master Plan", a campaign to enhance academic, athletic, and administrative facilities. Over $800 million is earmarked for campus construction and renovation over twenty years. The plan called for an "athletic village", where all of the university's athletic facilities will be located on the main campus. To accomplish this goal, the athletic department bought most of the property north of Boone Pickens Stadium up to McElroy between Knoblock and Washington streets. The city of Stillwater and property owners criticized this land gram. While the vast majority of the real estate was rental property appealing to college students, a few owners were longtime residents. A lone holdout in this parcel of land sued OSU over their right to use eminent domain to condemn and acquire their land.

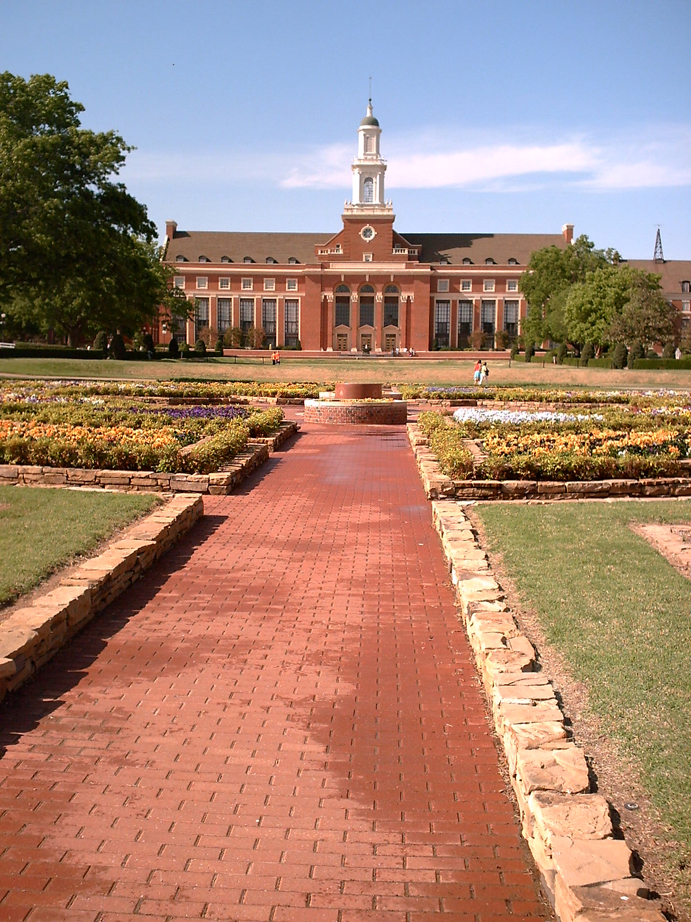
Edmon Low Library

In 2006, OSU received a gift of $165 million from an alumnus T. Boone Pickens to the university's athletic department. Two years later, Pickens donated $100 million for endowed academic chairs. It was the largest gift for academics ever given in the state. Ethical concerns have been raised by the media questioning the propriety of some of the Pickens' gifts, which were in media reports about the propriety of how some of the Pickens gifts have been made, were immediately returned to Pickens, and then placed in hedge funds owned by Pickens' companies. In February 2010, Pickens announced that he was pledging another $100 million to fund a scholarship endowment as part of a $1 billion fund-raising campaign titled "Branding Success". The pledge brought the total pledged or contributed to OSU by Pickens to over $500 million.

On October 24, 2015, during the annual homecoming parade, Adacia Chambers drove her vehicle into a crowd of people, killing 4 people and injuring 47. She faced 2nd-degree murder charges. Ten years later, on October 19, 2025, a shooting occurred at the Carreker East residence hall; three people were injured.

== Colleges ==
The medical campus has an affiliation with Oklahoma State University Medical Center for clinical training and offers residency/fellowship opportunities. Also with the medical school, OSU established a campus in Tahlequah, Oklahoma, the capital of the Cherokee Nation and the nation's first, and currently only, tribally-affiliated medical school.

In 2020, the College of Education and Human Sciences was created, which merged the College of Human Sciences and College of Education, Health, and Aviation into a single college. In August 2021, the university announced the creation of the Oklahoma Aerospace Institute for Research and Education (OAIRE).

== Admissions ==
For the class of 2023 (enrolling Fall 2019), OSU received 15,277 applications and accepted 10,691 (70.0%), with 4,200 enrolling. The middle 50% range of SAT scores for enrolling freshmen was 530–635 for evidence-based reading and writing, 510–630 for math, and 1040–1255 for the composite. The middle 50% ACT score range was 19–27 for math, 21–27 for English, and 21–28 for the composite.

== Rankings and reputation ==
Academic rankings

National
- Forbes: 200
- U.S. News & World Report: 198 (tie)
- Washington Monthly: 377
- WSJ/College Pulse: 228

Global
- ARWU: 701–800
- QS: 851–900
- THE: 601–800
- U.S. News & World Report: 747 (tie)

== Student life ==
Undergraduate demographics as of Fall 2023
Race and ethnicity	Total
White	66%
Two or more races	11%
Hispanic	10%
American Indian/Alaska Native	5%
Black	4%
Asian	2%
International student	2%
Economic diversity
Low-income (Note: The percentage of students who received an income-based federal Pell grant intended for low-income students.)	27%
Affluent (Note: The percentage of students who are a part of the American middle class at the bare minimum.)	73%

=== Housing ===
Current university-owned housing options include 31 residence halls, more than 15 dining options, and six family-first apartment complexes. In recent years, on-campus housing has been undergoing significant transformation. Student living was previously dominated by traditional residence halls; however, apartment-style buildings now comprise approximately half of the living quarters. In 2005, the high-rise Willham North and South residence halls that once dominated the Stillwater skyline were demolished and replaced with the Village suites on its site. Iba Hall, another traditional hall, was closed in 2007 but was reopened in 2011 due to an increase of incoming freshman. In 2017, Iba Hall underwent significant renovations which lasted through most of that year, before reopening in time for the Fall 2018 semester.

Iba, Parker, Wentz, and Stout Halls continue to offer traditional residence hall accommodations. In addition, three residence halls were opened in the fall of 2015, collectively known as the University Commons. North houses female students, south houses male students, and West is a co-ed facility that also houses the twenty-four-hour service desk for the area. Kerr-Drummond was slated to be closed with the opening of the University Commons, however Drummond was temporarily kept open in fall 2015 due to increased occupancy of campus housing while Kerr was closed. Drummond was then closed in 2018 due to facility issues. Kerr-Drummond is planned to be demolished sometime after Fall 2024. Apartments for single students are Bost, Davis, Morsani-Smith, Peterson-Friend, Kamm, Sitlington, and Young Halls. Housing in suite-style accommodations are provided in the named Village CASNR (College of Agricultural Science and Natural Resources), Village HS (Human Sciences), Village C, Village D, Village E and Village F. Deluxe suites are provided in Patchin & Jones, Bennett, Zink & Allen, and Stinchcomb & Booker Halls. Graduate students and families are offered accommodations in seven apartments "neighborhoods" with a variety of floor plans and amenities: Brumley, Demaree, Prosser, Stevens, West, and Williams.

=== Student Organizations ===
Oklahoma State University maintains a delegation to the Oklahoma Intercollegiate Legislature. With the delegation being one of the oldest in the organization.

== Athletics ==
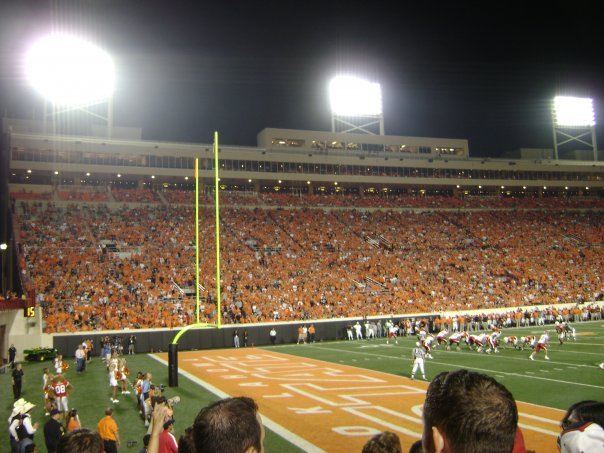
Houston Cougars vs Oklahoma State Cowboys football game at Boone Pickens Stadium in 2008

NCAA Division I-A
Conference: Big 12
Major Rivalries: University of Oklahoma Sooners
Minor Rivalries: University of Texas Longhorns, University of Kansas Jayhawks, Iowa State University Cyclones (wrestling)

NCAA Championships: 54 (#6 after Stanford, USC, UCLA, UT Austin, and Penn St.)

=== Football ===
11 conference titles – 34 bowl games played – 1945 National Champions - 1988 Heisman Trophy winner and single-season rushing record (Barry Sanders).

=== Basketball ===
Men's basketball is tradition rich at Oklahoma State. Oklahoma State made the Final Four in 1995 and 2004 and was the first ever Division 1 basketball program to win back-to-back National Championships in 1945 and 1946.

=== Wrestling ===
The Cowboy wrestling team brought home their 33rd NCAA championship in spring 2005, scoring the most points ever by an Oklahoma State wrestling team in the NCAA. OSU won their 34th overall (and 4th consecutive) title in 2006. OSU's 34 team titles are the most ever collected by a school in one sport. The Cowboys have also produced 143 individual national champions, including the sport's first-ever four-time champion, Pat Smith.

=== Other sports ===
Since the 1924 Olympics, 68 Oklahoma State University Olympians have won a total of 31 medals: 20 gold, four silver, and seven bronze.

== Fight songs ==
Notable among several songs commonly played and sung at various events such as commencement, convocation, and athletic games are: The Waving Song, Ride 'Em Cowboys (the Oklahoma State University fight song), and the OSU Chant. At the end of every sporting event win or lose, OSU student-athletes face the student section and sing the alma mater along with other students, faculty, alumni, and staff.

== Notable people ==
=== Alumni ===
Today, there are more than 200,000 living OSU alumni worldwide. Prominent alumni include billionaire business magnate and philanthropist T. Boone Pickens, actor James Marsden, "the father of the personal computer" Ed Roberts, country singers Garth Brooks and Hoyt Axton, Governor of Oklahoma Kevin Stitt, former Prime Minister of South Korea Nam Duck-woo, former Prime Minister of Jordan Adnan Badran, former U.S. Senator Tom Coburn, former Governor of Oklahoma Mary Fallin, former acting Surgeon General of the United States Robert A. Whitney, Oklahoma Supreme Court Justice Steven W. Taylor, former Central Bank of Somalia Governor Yussur A.F. Abrar, production designer and drummer K.K. Barrett, legal scholar Anita Hill, and Indian politician Ponnala Lakshmaiah. Theresa Mkandawire is a Professor of civil engineering in Malawi. Former dean of the Tecnológico de Monterrey university system David Noel Ramírez Padilla took courses at OSU in 1975.

== Campus buildings ==
Listed below are just a few of the buildings at OSU. For a complete list, visit List of Oklahoma State University buildings.

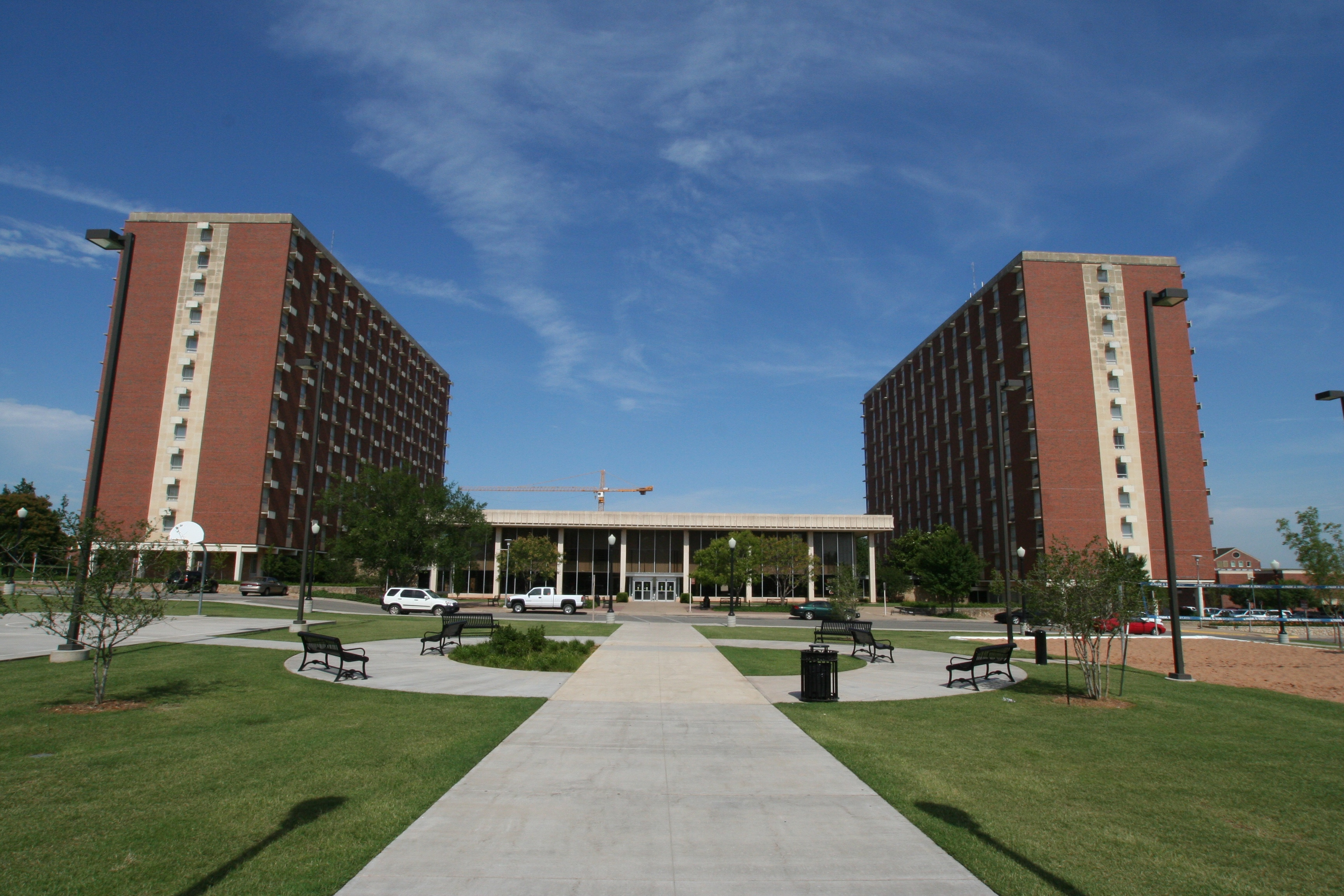
Kerr and Drummond halls

=== Other buildings ===
- O'Brate Stadium – Baseball
- Bennett Memorial Chapel
- Boone Pickens Stadium – Football stadium named after T. Boone Pickens, a billionaire business magnate, philanthropist, and alumnus of the university
- Cowgirl Stadium
- Historic Gallagher-Iba Arena – Named top collegiate venue in the United States by CBS Sportsline. It is named after Edward C. Gallagher and Henry Iba. It is home to practice facilities, weight, and locker rooms as well as the original white maple wood basketball court. The court is named Eddie Sutton Court, in honor of the former OSU Men's Basketball Coach. Sutton led the Cowboys to two Final Four appearances during his time as coach.
- National Wrestling Hall of Fame and Museum
- Student Union – Known as the largest student union in the world. Portions of the 1992 film All-American Murder were filmed at the Student Union.
- Whitehurst Hall administration building

== See also ==
- Gift of a Lifetime
- Johnny Bright incident – An incident that occurred during a football game on Saturday, October 20, 1951
- List of forestry universities and colleges
- Oklahoma Agricultural Experiment Station
