= Stillwater, Oklahoma =

- City
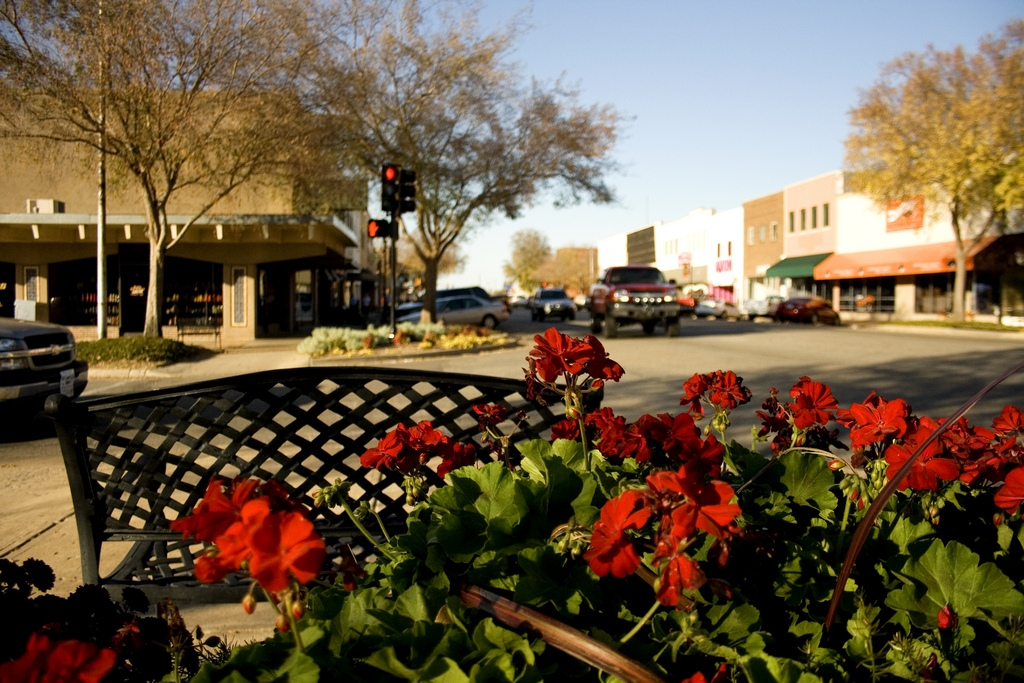
- Downtown Stillwater (2009)

- Wordmark
- Nicknames: "Stilly", "America's Friendliest College Town"
- Motto: Still Pioneering
- Location within Payne County

- Location within Oklahoma Stillwater (the United States)
- Coordinates: 36°06′58″N 97°03′32″W
- Country: United States
- State: Oklahoma
- County: Payne
- Incorporated: 1884

Government
  - Type: Council-manager
  - Mayor: Will Joyce

Area
  - Total: 30.31 sq mi (78.49 km^{2})
  - Land: 29.79 sq mi (77.15 km^{2})
  - Water: 0.51 sq mi (1.33 km^{2})
- Elevation: 948 ft (289 m)

Population (2020)
  - Total: 48,394
  - Density: 1,624.5/sq mi (627.23/km^{2})
- Time zone: UTC−6 (CST)
  - Summer (DST): UTC−5 (CDT)
- ZIP codes: 74074–74078
- Area code: 405/572
- FIPS code: 40-70300
- GNIS ID: 2411982
- Website: stillwaterok.gov

Stillwater is the tenth-largest city in the U.S. state of Oklahoma, and the county seat of Payne County. It is located in north-central Oklahoma at the intersection of U.S. Route 177 and State Highway 51. As of the 2020 census, the city population was 48,394. The Stillwater Micropolitan Statistical Area had a population of 78,399 according to the 2012 census estimate. Stillwater was part of the first Oklahoma Land Run held on April 22, 1889, when the Unassigned Lands were opened for settlement and became the core of the new Oklahoma Territory. The city charter was adopted on August 24, 1889, and the city operates under a council-manager government system.

Stillwater has a diverse economy with a foundation in aerospace, agribusiness, biotechnology, optoelectronics, printing and publishing, and software and standard manufacturing. Stillwater is home to the main campus of Oklahoma State University (the city's largest employer) as well as Northern Oklahoma College – Stillwater, Meridian Technology Center, and the Oklahoma Department of Career and Technology Education. The city is also home to the National Wrestling Hall of Fame and Museum.

== History ==
The north-central region of Oklahoma became part of the United States with the Louisiana Purchase in 1803. In 1832, author and traveler Washington Irving provided the first recorded description of the area around Stillwater in his book A Tour on the Prairies. He wrote of "a glorious prairie spreading out beneath the golden beams of an autumnal sun. The deep and frequent traces of buffalo, showed it to be a one of their favorite grazing grounds."

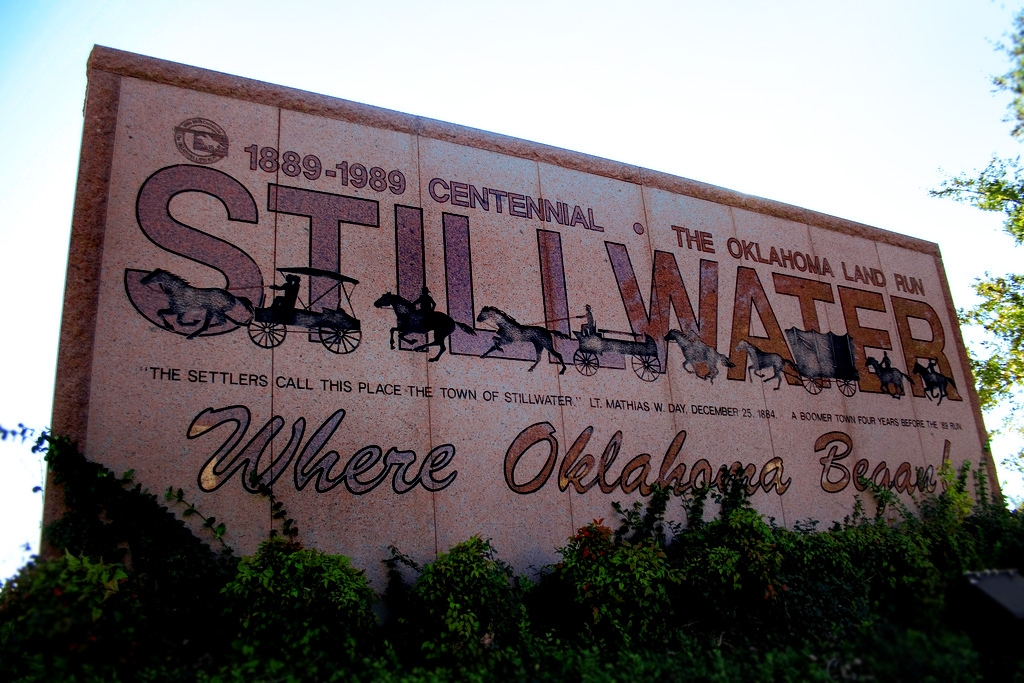
Stillwater welcome sign, 2010

According to one legend, local Native American tribes—Ponca, Kiowa, Osage, Pawnee—called the creek "Still Water" because the water was always still. A second legend states that cattlemen driving herds from Texas to railways back east always found water "still there". A third legend holds that David L. Payne walked up to Stillwater Creek and said, "This town should be named Still Water". Members of the board thought he was crazy, but the name stuck.

Stillwater Creek received its official name in 1884 when William L. Couch established his "boomer colony" on its banks. While the creek itself was tranquil, the next few years saw turmoil as pioneers sought free, fertile land and soldiers held them off while complicated legal issues and land titles with Creek and Seminole tribes were hashed out. On April 22, 1889, the cannons fired signaling the first Land Run that opened up the Unassigned Lands of the Oklahoma Territory, which included Stillwater. By the end of the day, 240 acres (0.97 km^{2}) had been claimed and designated as Stillwater Township and a tent city with a population numbering 300 had sprung up on the prairie. The Encyclopedia of Oklahoma History and Culture simply says that the name officially became Stillwater only when the post office opened on May 28, 1889.

On Christmas Eve, 1890, the legislature of Oklahoma Territory passed a bill certifying Stillwater as the land grant college site. In 1894, Oklahoma Agricultural and Mechanical College held a dedication of its first brick building, Assembly Building, later known as Old Central. Between 1889 and statehood, Stillwater grew. By statehood in 1907, downtown Stillwater was home to more than 50 buildings including several banks, churches, grocery stores, hotels, and department stores.

The first newspaper was the Stillwater Gazette; telephone and gas service arrived in 1899; and the Eastern Oklahoma Railroad arrived in 1900.

Around this time, direct descendants of Johann Sebastian Bach began to reside in Stillwater, through his eldest son Wilhelm Friedemann Bach and his illegitimate grandchild.

The population in 1917 was 3,000 and by World War II it had grown to more than 10,000. During the war, town leaders' aim was to convert Oklahoma A&M into a war training center. They succeeded in creating 12 training units that involved bringing nearly 40,000 service men and women to Stillwater. The WAVES (Women's Accepted for Volunteer Emergency Service) was the largest with 10,000 participants. Quonset huts were dotted across town and barracks occupied the site where Stillwater Medical Center and the CareerTech headquarters are now. This vast operation tided the city through the war and served as a base for a healthy economy in the postwar period. In 1952, the Industrial Foundation was established and its trustees worked to bring new industry to town: Moore Plant in 1966, Swan Hose in 1968, Mercury Marine in 1973, National Standard plant in 1988, World Color Press in 1974 and Armstrong World Industries, Inc. in 1988. The census of 2000, the population was 39,065; however, the population was adjusted to 46,156 in 2009.

== Government ==
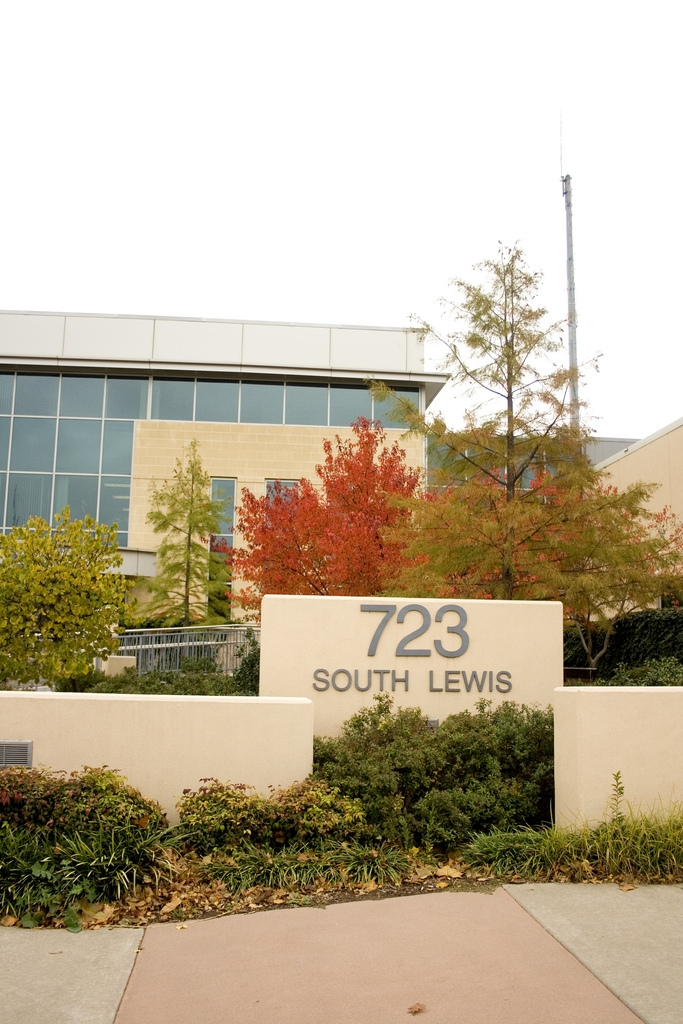
Stillwater Municipal Building

The City of Stillwater operates under a council–manager government system, in which an elected city council is responsible for making policy, passing ordinances and approving the city's budget. The council appoints a city manager who implements the policies adopted by the council.

The city council meets the first and third Monday of the month in the Council Room at the Stillwater Municipal Building, 723 S. Lewis.

Stillwater does not have city council districts; instead, it has general elections every year. The mayor and councilors are elected to three-year or four-year terms with at least one of the five seats up for election in April every year. Any person elected to the office of mayor or council member after January 1, 2017, is eligible to serve no more than 12 years on the council. Years served do not need to be consecutive. The vice mayor is elected by the council members and acts as mayor during mayor's absence.

As of July 2022, the city council consists of Mayor Will Joyce, Vice Mayor Alane Zannotti, and councilors Amy Dzialowski, Kevin Clark and Christie Hawkins.

The City of Stillwater employs approximately 500 people. The city encourages resident participation on the boards and committees, and applications are accepted year around. Commissions and authorities oversee city policies and services.

Stillwater's 2009 crime rate for serious crimes (UCR Part 1) was 3,657 per 100,000 residents compared to the 2009 national crime rate of 3,466 per crimes per 100,000 residents (FBI 2009 Crime in the United States). In 2009, Stillwater reported: 22 rapes, 15 robberies, 519 assaults, 308 burglaries, and 1,185 larcenies.

Stillwater is located in districts 33 and 34 of the Oklahoma State House of Representatives and is represented by Republican John Talley in the 33rd district and Democrat Trish Ranson in the 34th district; as of July 2022 In the Oklahoma State Senate, Stillwater is in the 21st district and is represented by Republican Tom Dugger.

In the United States House of Representatives, Stillwater is represented by Republican Frank Lucas, of the third district in Oklahoma. In the U.S. Senate, Stillwater is represented by Republicans James Lankford and Markwayne Mullin.

== Geography ==
Stillwater is located 60 miles (97 km) north-northeast of downtown Oklahoma City and 63 miles (101 km) directly west of downtown Tulsa by road. According to the United States Census Bureau, the city has a total area of 28.3 square miles (73.3 km^{2}), of which 27.9 square miles (72.1 km^{2}) is land and 0.5 square mile (1.2 km^{2}) (1.62%) is water.

=== Climate ===
Stillwater has a humid subtropical climate, and is located in the area popularly known as "Tornado Alley". During peak storm season in the spring, tornado watches and warnings are frequent, with sirens sounding to warn townsfolk to hurry to shelters when necessary. Summers are sunny, hot, and humid, with the temperature reaching or exceeding 100 (38 °C) ten times annually on average. Winters are generally sunny, mild, and dry, with an average January high temperature of 49.8 °F (9.9 °C) and an average annual snowfall of 7.5 inches (19.1 cm).

The highest recorded temperature was 115 °F (46.1 °C) on August 11, 1936, and the lowest recorded temperature was −21 °F (−29.4 °C) on February 10, 2011.

Climate data for Stillwater, Oklahoma, 1991–2020 normals, extremes 1893–present
Month	Jan	Feb	Mar	Apr	May	Jun	Jul	Aug	Sep	Oct	Nov	Dec	Year
Record high °F (°C)	82 (28)	92 (33)	98 (37)	104 (40)	101 (38)	106 (41)	113 (45)	115 (46)	110 (43)	99 (37)	89 (32)	84 (29)	115 (46)
Mean maximum °F (°C)	72.8 (22.7)	77.6 (25.3)	85.1 (29.5)	89.1 (31.7)	92.1 (33.4)	96.9 (36.1)	103.4 (39.7)	103.3 (39.6)	97.9 (36.6)	90.3 (32.4)	80.7 (27.1)	72.2 (22.3)	105.5 (40.8)
Mean daily maximum °F (°C)	49.8 (9.9)	53.6 (12.0)	63.1 (17.3)	72.7 (22.6)	79.7 (26.5)	88.3 (31.3)	93.4 (34.1)	93.2 (34.0)	85.2 (29.6)	74.5 (23.6)	61.9 (16.6)	51.4 (10.8)	72.2 (22.4)
Daily mean °F (°C)	36.6 (2.6)	40.6 (4.8)	49.9 (9.9)	59.3 (15.2)	67.9 (19.9)	77.1 (25.1)	81.6 (27.6)	80.7 (27.1)	72.4 (22.4)	60.6 (15.9)	49.0 (9.4)	39.0 (3.9)	59.6 (15.3)
Mean daily minimum °F (°C)	23.4 (−4.8)	27.6 (−2.4)	36.7 (2.6)	45.9 (7.7)	56.0 (13.3)	66.0 (18.9)	69.8 (21.0)	68.3 (20.2)	59.6 (15.3)	46.7 (8.2)	36.1 (2.3)	26.6 (−3.0)	46.9 (8.3)
Mean minimum °F (°C)	8.8 (−12.9)	11.2 (−11.6)	18.7 (−7.4)	29.6 (−1.3)	40.6 (4.8)	54.3 (12.4)	61.9 (16.6)	58.2 (14.6)	44.9 (7.2)	30.4 (−0.9)	19.9 (−6.7)	11.4 (−11.4)	3.4 (−15.9)
Record low °F (°C)	−12 (−24)	−21 (−29)	−5 (−21)	16 (−9)	29 (−2)	43 (6)	50 (10)	43 (6)	31 (−1)	12 (−11)	7 (−14)	−15 (−26)	−21 (−29)
Average precipitation inches (mm)	1.28 (33)	1.54 (39)	2.48 (63)	3.72 (94)	5.00 (127)	4.94 (125)	3.51 (89)	3.51 (89)	3.46 (88)	3.24 (82)	2.27 (58)	1.79 (45)	36.74 (932)
Average snowfall inches (cm)	1.6 (4.1)	1.0 (2.5)	2.1 (5.3)	0.0 (0.0)	0.0 (0.0)	0.0 (0.0)	0.0 (0.0)	0.0 (0.0)	0.0 (0.0)	0.0 (0.0)	0.1 (0.25)	2.7 (6.9)	7.5 (19.05)
Average precipitation days (≥ 0.01 in)	4.3	4.9	6.0	7.3	9.1	7.5	5.3	6.6	6.3	6.4	4.8	4.8	73.3
Average snowy days (≥ 0.1 in)	1.2	0.5	0.6	0.0	0.0	0.0	0.0	0.0	0.0	0.0	0.2	1.1	3.6
Source 1: NOAA
Source 2: National Weather Service

== Neighborhoods ==
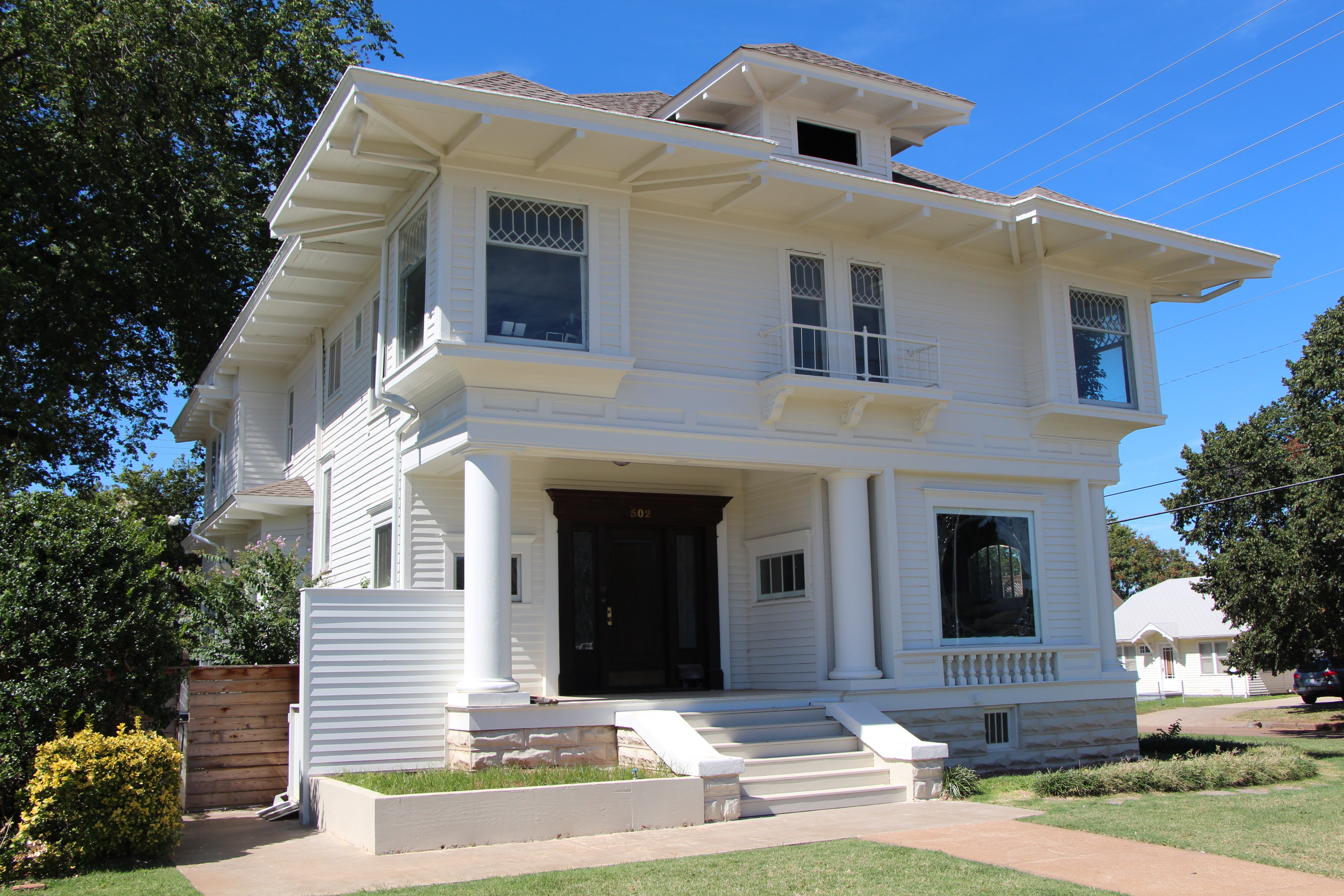
James E. Berry House, 502 S. Duck St., near Downtown Stillwater

=== Downtown ===
Downtown Stillwater is a business improvement district with Main Street as its primary thoroughfare. It is located between Duncan St. and Lowry St. from 4th Ave. to 15th Ave and includes roughly eleven blocks of businesses, storefronts, bars, and restaurants. Notable places near downtown include the Modella Art Gallery, the OSU Museum of Art, the Prairie Arts Center, the Stillwater Community Center, the Stillwater History Museum at the Sheerar, and the Stillwater Public Library.

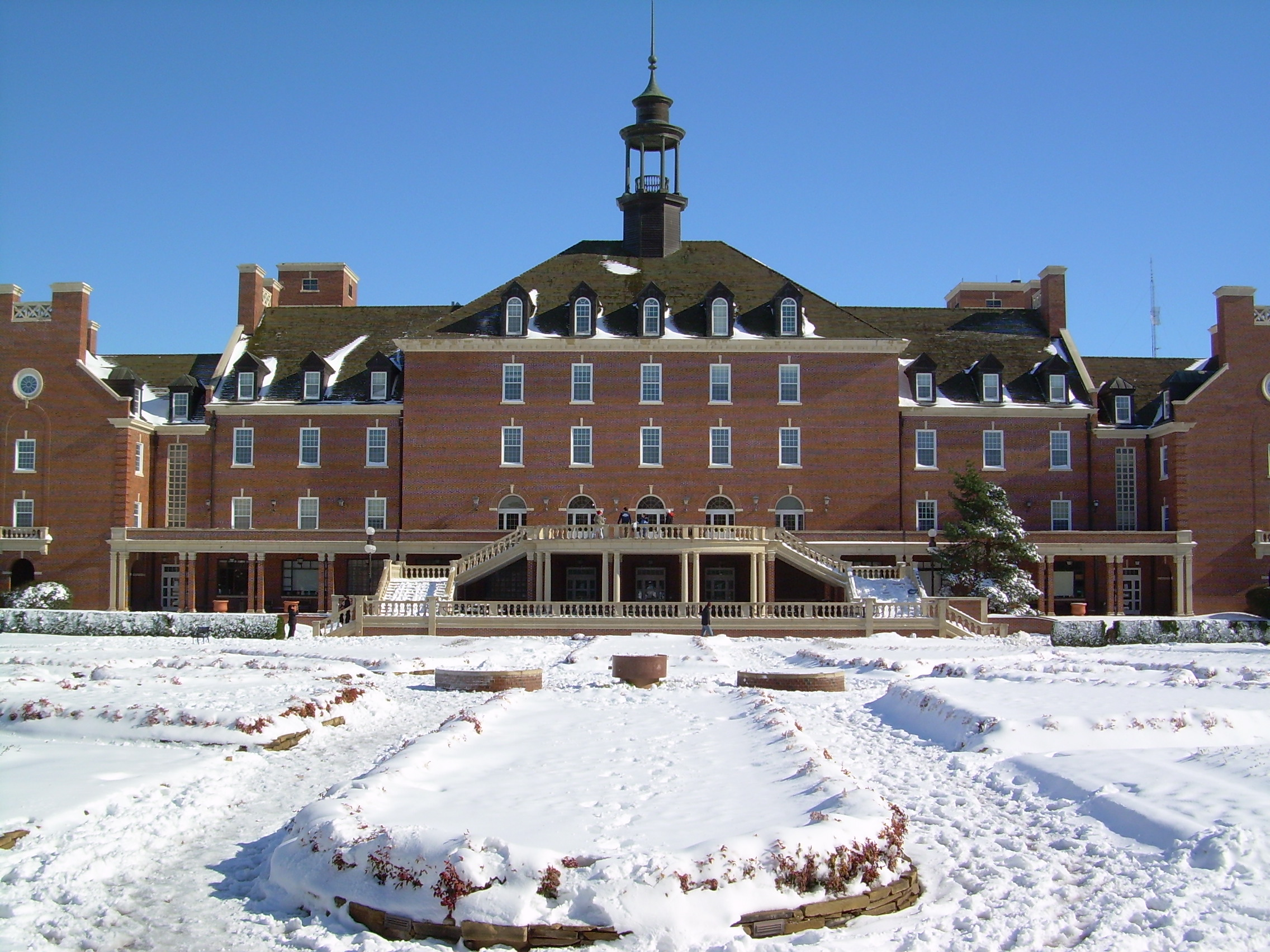
The Oklahoma State Student Union on the OSU campus

=== OSU Campus ===
The Oklahoma State University campus sits just northwest of Downtown Stillwater. Notable landmarks include Boone Pickens Stadium, the Edmon Low Library, Theta Pond, the Oklahoma State Student Union, and Old Central, the oldest building on campus.

=== Campus Corner ===
Campus Corner is a college-oriented shopping district on the Southeast corner of the OSU campus. The center of the district is the meeting point of S Knoblock St and W University Ave. It is similar to and modeled after Campus Corner on the University of Oklahoma campus in Norman, Oklahoma. The area is best known for its renowned restaurants and bars, including Eskimo Joe's, George's Stables, and the original location of Hideaway Pizza.

=== The Strip ===
The Strip is an entertainment district on Washington St, just south of the OSU campus, running from W University Ave to W 6th Ave. It is known for its nightlife and is popular among local college students and alumni. The district has many restaurants, nightclubs, pool halls, and live music venues. Notable staples on the Strip include J.R. Murphy's, Coney Island Stillwater, and The Barn, a drive-thru liquor store. The career of Garth Brooks began on the Strip after he was discovered at the bar Willie's Saloon by Dallas entertainment attorney, Rod Phelps.

== Demographics ==
Historical population
Census	Pop.	Note	%±
1890	480		—
1900	2,431		406.5%
1910	3,444		41.7%
1920	4,701		36.5%
1930	7,016		49.2%
1940	10,097		43.9%
1950	20,238		100.4%
1960	23,965		18.4%
1970	31,126		29.9%
1980	38,268		22.9%
1990	36,676		−4.2%
2000	39,065		6.5%
2010	45,688		17.0%
2020	48,394		5.9%

=== Racial and ethnic composition ===
Stillwater city, Oklahoma – Racial and ethnic composition Note: the US Census treats Hispanic/Latino as an ethnic category. This table excludes Latinos from the racial categories and assigns them to a separate category. Hispanics/Latinos may be of any race.
Race / Ethnicity (NH = Non-Hispanic)	2020	2010	2000	1990	1980
White alone (NH)	69.3% (33,550)	77% (35,170)	81.3% (31,745)	86.5% (31,718)	89.4% (34,223)
Black alone (NH)	4.5% (2,155)	4.6% (2,104)	4.3% (1,666)	3.7% (1,346)	3.7% (1,404)
American Indian alone (NH)	3.6% (1,756)	3.8% (1,744)	3.8% (1,469)	3.4% (1,242)	2.5% (939)
Asian alone (NH)	5.2% (2,516)	5.5% (2,533)	5% (1,965)	4.6% (1,688)	2% (759)
Pacific Islander alone (NH)	0.1% (34)	0.1% (27)	0% (13)		
Other race alone (NH)	0.4% (182)	0.1% (55)	0.1% (45)	0.1% (22)	0.2% (95)
Multiracial (NH)	9.5% (4,581)	4.6% (2,108)	3% (1,186)	—	—
Hispanic/Latino (any race)	7.5% (3,620)	4.3% (1,947)	2.5% (976)	1.8% (660)	2.2% (848)

=== 2020 census ===
As of the 2020 census, Stillwater had a population of 48,394. The median age was 24.4 years. 15.3% of residents were under the age of 18 and 10.8% of residents were 65 years of age or older. For every 100 females there were 97.5 males, and for every 100 females age 18 and over there were 96.6 males age 18 and over.

99.2% of residents lived in urban areas, while 0.8% lived in rural areas.

There were 18,477 households in Stillwater, of which 21.8% had children under the age of 18 living in them. Of all households, 32.0% were married-couple households, 28.2% were households with a male householder and no spouse or partner present, and 33.0% were households with a female householder and no spouse or partner present. About 36.7% of all households were made up of individuals and 8.8% had someone living alone who was 65 years of age or older.

There were 22,150 housing units, of which 16.6% were vacant. Among occupied housing units, 36.5% were owner-occupied and 63.5% were renter-occupied. The homeowner vacancy rate was 2.3% and the rental vacancy rate was 17.4%.

Racial composition as of the 2020 census
Race	Percent
White	71.8%
Black or African American	4.6%
American Indian and Alaska Native	3.8%
Asian	5.2%
Native Hawaiian and Other Pacific Islander	0.1%
Some other race	2.5%
Two or more races	12.0%
Hispanic or Latino (of any race)	7.5%

=== 2010 census ===
As of the 2010 census, there were 45,688 people, 17,941 households, and 7,920 families residing in the city. The population density was 1,547 inhabitants per square mile (597/km^{2}). The racial makeup of the city was 79.50% White, 4.71% African American, 3.93% Native American, 5.56% Asian, 0.06% Pacific Islander, 1.19% from other races, and 5.05% from two or more races. Hispanic or Latino of any race were 4.26% of the population.

=== 2000 census ===
As of the 2000 census, there were 15,604 households, out of which 20.8% had children under the age of 18 living with them, 36.1% were married couples living together, 7.7% had a female householder with no husband present, and 53.1% were non-families. 34.6% of all households were made up of individuals, and 6.9% had someone living alone who was 65 years of age or older. The average household size was 2.13 and the average family size was 2.81.

In the city, the population was spread out, with 15.2% under the age of 18, 38.2% from 18 to 24, 24.4% from 25 to 44, 13.6% from 45 to 64, and 8.7% who were 65 years of age or older. The median age was 24 years. For every 100 females, there were 102.7 males. For every 100 females age 18 and over, there were 102.4 males.

The median income for a household in the city was $25,432, and the median income for a family was $41,938. Males had a median income of $31,623 versus $22,312 for females. The per capita income for the city was $15,789. About 12.6% of families and 27.3% of the population were below the poverty line, including 18.2% of those under age 18 and 8.9% of those age 65 or over.

== Economy ==
Stillwater is home to a diverse mix of businesses and industries, from manufacturing to advanced technology. Among its export industries are printing and publishing, floor covering, wire products, software, food and kindred products, and research. Stillwater has the following economic clusters: aerospace, agribusiness, biotechnology, optoelectronics, printing and publishing, software and standard manufacturing.

Oklahoma State University plays a significant part in Stillwater's overall economy with more than 20,000 students, 5,500 personnel, and a focus on research and technology.

According to the Chamber of Commerce webpage, "Existing Industries", top employers in Stillwater are as follows:

Employer	Employees
Oklahoma State University	6,007
Stillwater Medical Center	1,031
OnCue Express	903
Stillwater Public Schools	779
City of Stillwater	585
Walmart	402
Simmons Bank	300
Oklahoma Career Technology	280
National Standard	185
Ocean Dental Headquarters	175
Kicker Audio Headquarters	127

== Education ==
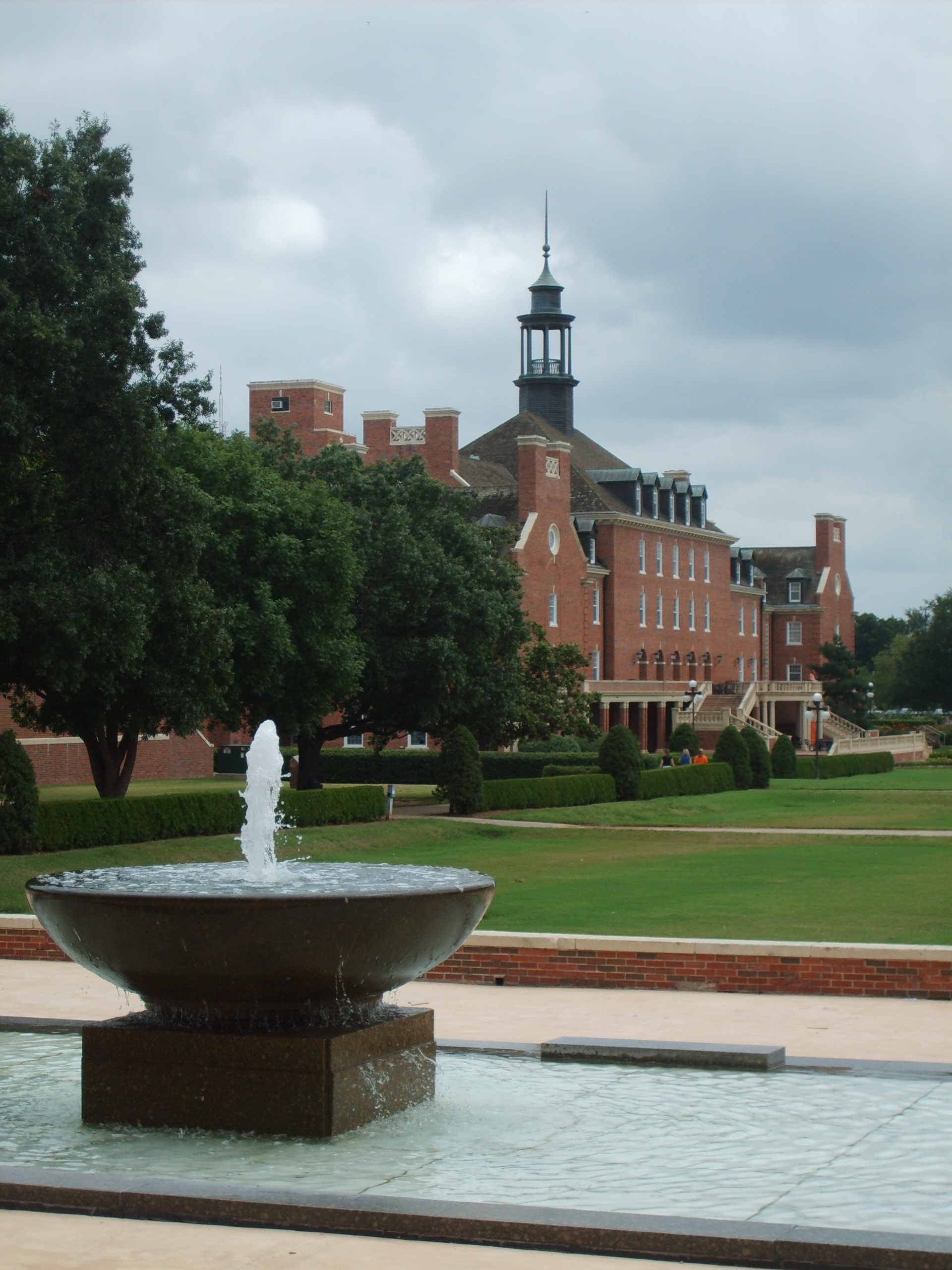
Oklahoma State University Student Union

Oklahoma State University – Stillwater is located in Stillwater.

In 2003, Northern Oklahoma College added a campus in Stillwater. Applicants who do not meet Oklahoma State University admission requirements may attend the NOC-OSU Gateway Program held on the campus.

Stillwater is home to the Meridian Technology Center and also the state agency that oversees career technology schools in Oklahoma, the Oklahoma Department of Career and Technology Education.

Stillwater Public Schools covers almost all of the territory in the city limits, and this territory includes all residential areas of the city. There are more than 5,400 students enrolled in the district. The district includes Highland Park, Richmond, Sangre Ridge, Skyline, Westwood, and Will Rogers elementary schools; Stillwater High School; Lincoln Academy (Alternative Education); Stillwater Middle School; and Stillwater Junior High.

A small piece of the city limits is in the Morrison Public Schools school district; this piece is occupied by airport property.

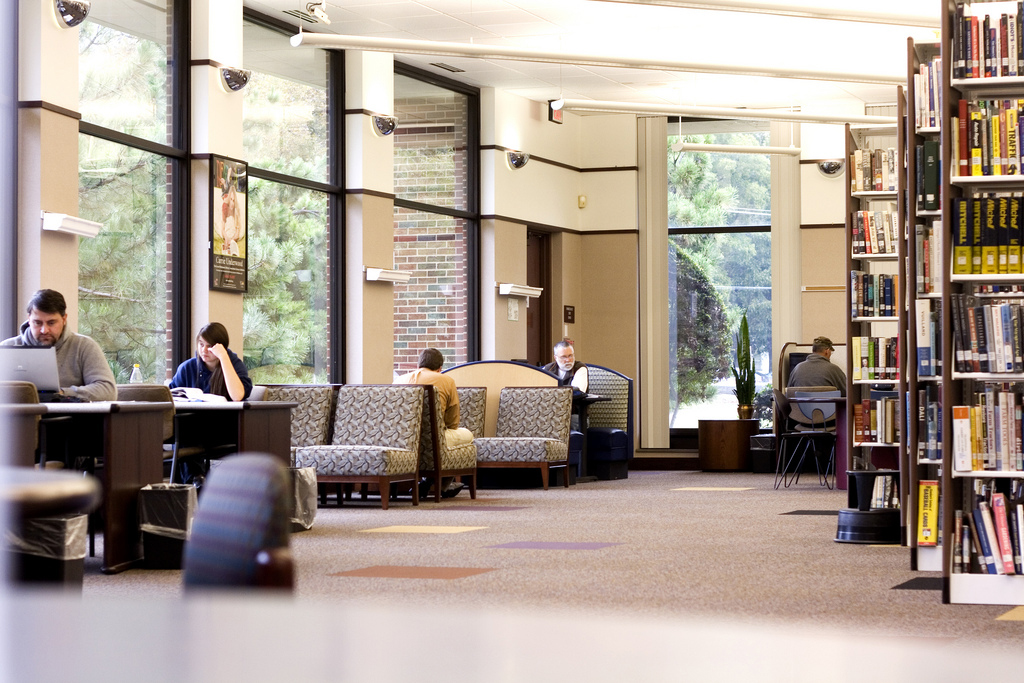
Inside the Stillwater Public Library

=== Libraries ===
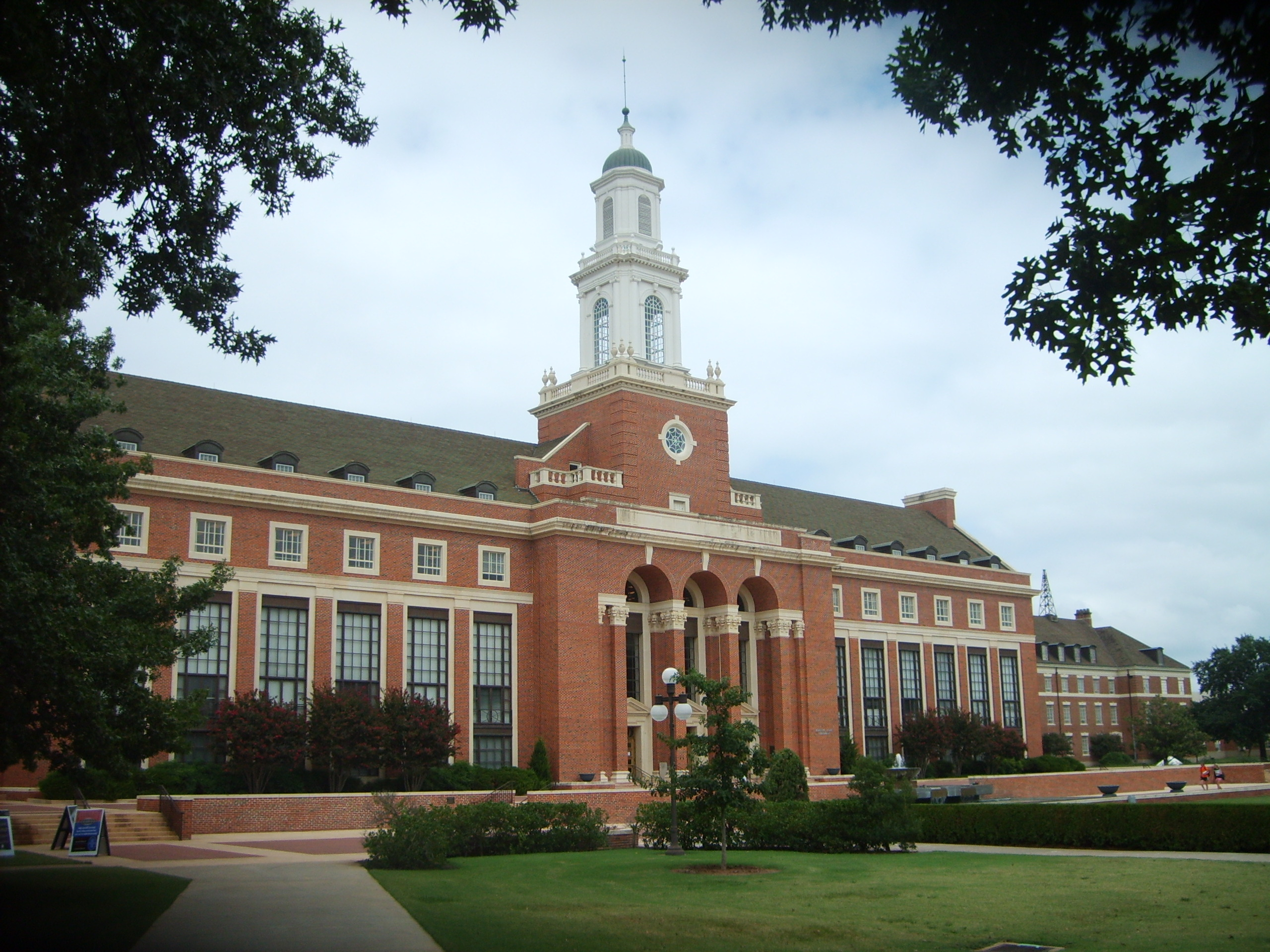
Edmon Low Library

Stillwater has been served by the Stillwater Public Library since 1922. In 1990, Stillwater voters passed a $4.98 million bond issue for the construction of a new public library at 1107 S. Duck. The Stillwater Public Library provides a core collection of more than 100,000 volumes and includes books, audio books, music CDs, DVDs, videos magazines and newspapers as well as technological services. The library is active in the community, holding events and programs, including free computer classes, children's storytimes, and scholarly databases with information on a variety of topics.

The Edmon Low Library at Oklahoma State University houses approximately 3 million volumes, 190,000 government documents, 70,000 electronic and print serials. Stillwater campus branch libraries include the Architecture Library, Curriculum Materials Library, Veterinary Medicine Library, Electronic Publishing Center, and the Library Annex. It is a federal depository library.

== Arts and culture ==
=== Performing Arts and Music ===
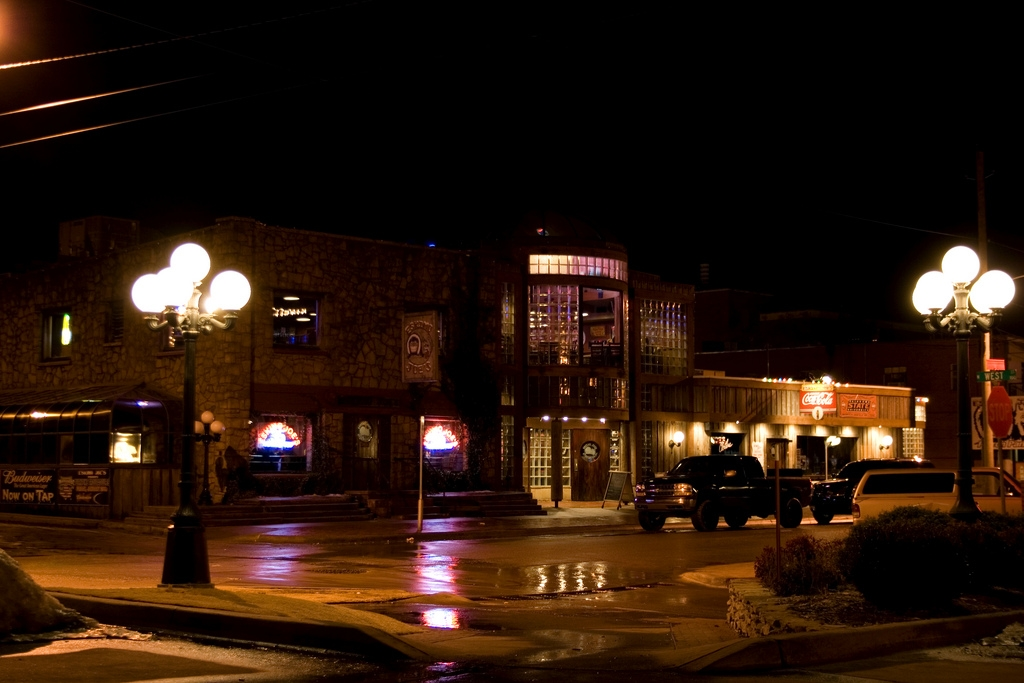
Eskimo Joe's (2010)

Stillwater is known as the home of Red Dirt music, a mixture of country, folk, blues, and rock. Notable Red Dirt artists from Stillwater include Cross Canadian Ragweed, Jason Boland & The Stragglers, the Red Dirt Rangers, The Great Divide, No Justice, Jenny Labow, the Jason Savory Band, and the father of Red Dirt, Bob Childers.

Garth Brooks, Other Lives, and The All-American Rejects launched their careers playing the local bars like Willie's Saloon and Eskimo Joe's.

Tumbleweed Dance Hall, home of the world-famous annual Calf Fry Festival, was nominated for "Dancehall of the Year" award by the Academy of Country Music.

Stillwater hosts several performing arts series, including performances at the City of Stillwater Community Center, the Town and Gown Community Theater. OSU's Allied Arts holds performances in the Seretean Center and the Jerry L. Davis Studio Theatre on the OSU-Stillwater campus. The McKnight Center, a new state-of-the-art performing arts center on campus, opened in 2019.

Stillwater is served by several voluntary organizations dedicated to providing entertainment and cultural experiences: the Stillwater Community Singers, the Stillwater Community Band and Stillwater Jazz.

=== Annual festivals and events ===
Stillwater is home to a number of annual festivals and community events held throughout the year. Residents also benefit from the many events and activities hosted by Oklahoma State University.

Since 1920, Oklahoma State University has welcomed alumni to "America’s Greatest Homecoming Celebration." Each year, more than 70,000 alumni and friends return to campus for "Walkaround" and the Homecoming Parade.

Spring kicks off with the Stillwater Public Education Foundation's A Taste of Stillwater, a fundraiser held every March. Other events include the Tumbleweed Calf Fry, the Stillwater Home Builders Association's Home and Garden Show, the Remember the 10 Run, and the OSU Jazz Festival.

The Stillwater Arts Festival is now in its third decade. The festival is a two-day, juried art show held in April that features live entertainment, artist demonstrations, and children's activities.

Since 2012, Stillwater has hosted the annual Land Run 100, a 100-mile (161 km) bicycling endurance race around north-central Oklahoma.

The Oklahoma Special Olympics’ Annual Summer Games take place every May. It is the largest amateur sporting event in Oklahoma and the largest Special Olympics event in the United States. Since 2011, Stillwater has hosted the annual Bob Childers' Gypsy Cafe, a Red Dirt music festival. Benefits from the event go to the Red Dirt Relief Fund, which supports Oklahoma musicians in crisis. In the summer, there is the Krazy Daze Shopping Extravaganza and the Payne County Fair. On Independence Day, Stillwater hosts the annual Boomer Blast, a fireworks show at Boomer Lake Park.

The fall season begins Collegefest, OSU Student Government Association's Lights on Stillwater (a trade-show style event where students learn about local organizations, shops, restaurants, and services), and the Downtown Stillwater Car Show. The annual Downtown Stillwater Halloween Festival is held the Tuesday before Halloween and includes a costume contest.

For more than twenty years, the Eskimo Joe's Juke Joint Jog 5K and Fun Run (one-mile race) has been held in the fall to benefit the Stillwater Area United Way.

The annual Red Dirt Film Festival is held every March. The independent film festival features screenings, panels, and workshops on the OSU campus.

Winter is celebrated with the Downtown Parade of Lights and the Madrigal Dinner Concert on the OSU campus.

=== Points of interest ===
The Sheerar Museum of Stillwater History is dedicated to collecting, preserving, and interpreting the history of Stillwater. The museum features exhibits on Stillwater and Payne County, including the first land run that opened Oklahoma Territory for settlement in 1889. The museum also offers a variety of temporary exhibits and programs.

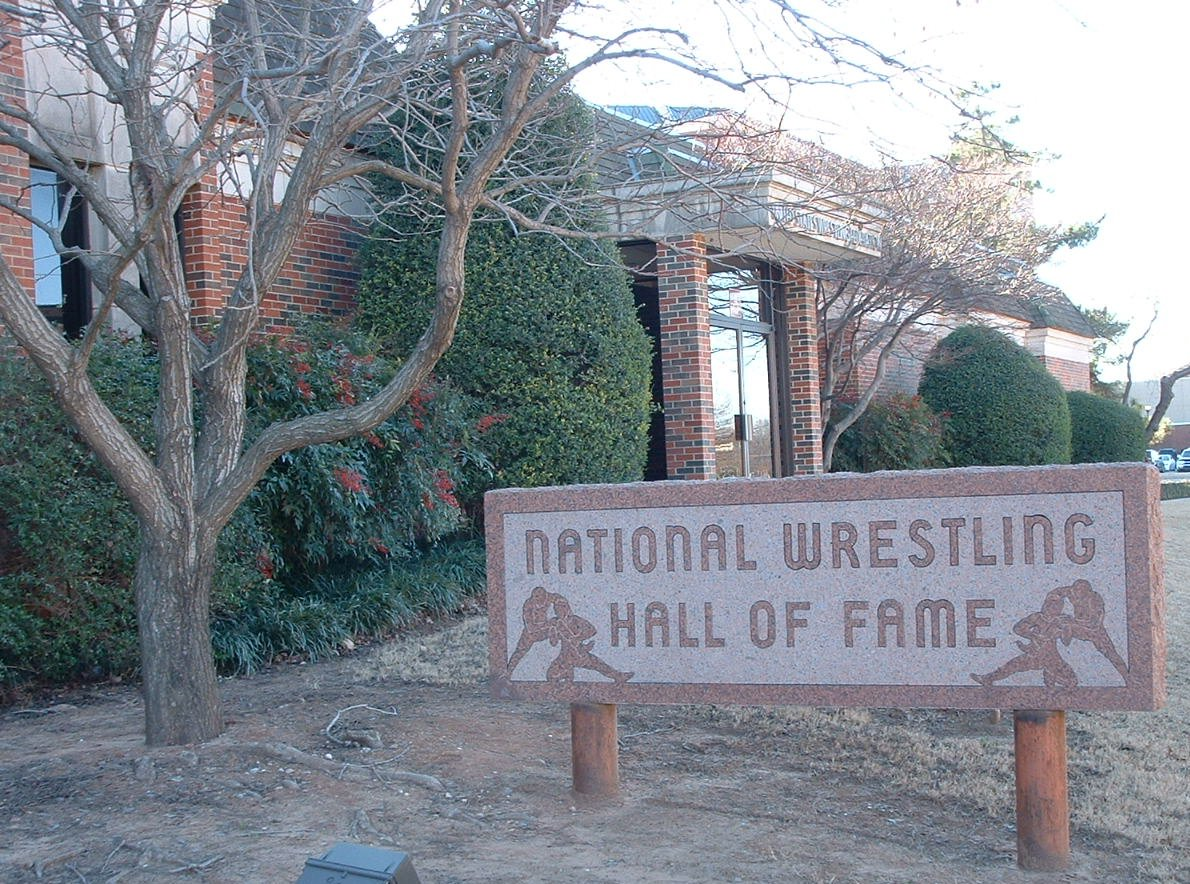
The National Wrestling Hall of Fame

The National Wrestling Hall of Fame and Museum is also located in Stillwater. It is dedicated to preserving the heritage of the sport, celebrating achievements, and encouraging young athletes.

The Washington Irving Trail and Museum, located in a rural setting, celebrates the heritage of Payne County. It is named for American writer Washington Irving who used to camp in the area. The museum features items from the famous Oklahoma boomer, David L. Payne.

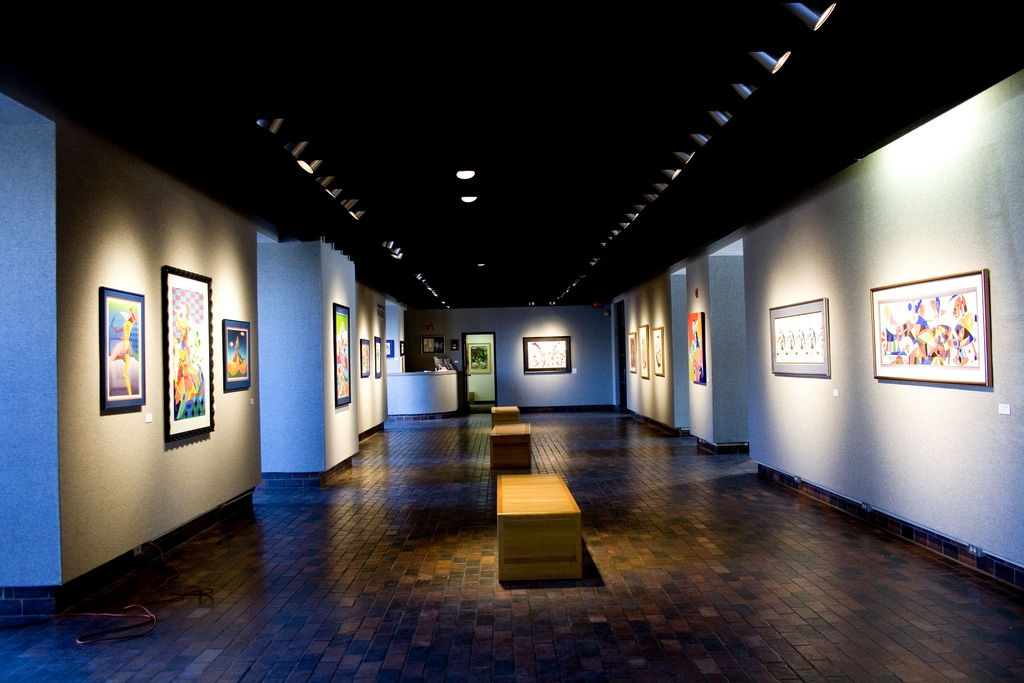
Gardiner Art Gallery

In October 2013, Oklahoma State University opened the OSU Museum of Art in the renovated Postal Plaza, a former WPA-built Federal Post Office in Downtown Stillwater. The university began collecting art in the 1930s, an endeavor initiated by the former head of the OSU Art Department, Doel Reed. The university also operates the Gardiner Art Gallery on campus in the Bartlett Center for the Visual Arts, home of the OSU Art Department. Exhibits in the gallery, which are open to the public, vary from student and faculty exhibits to national shows.

The Botanic Garden at Oklahoma State University covers more than 100 acres (0.40 km^{2}) with thousands of species of flowers, shrubs, grasses, and trees. It features specialized gardens like butterfly and organic gardens, turf and nursery research centers, and a Centennial Grove. It also has a 4.5 acres (1.8 ha) studio garden where OETA's show Oklahoma Gardening is filmed. The facility also has an authentic Japanese Tea Ceremony Garden.

The David L. Payne Memorial Monument, located in Boomer Lake Park, honors Oklahoma boomer, David L. Payne. In 1995, his body was exhumed and moved from Wellington, Kansas, to this site. Payne County, Oklahoma, is named for him.

The International Friendship Garden is located at the City of Stillwater Community Center and was built in 1997 by the Kameoka Landscape Gardeners Association to celebrate the tenth anniversary of the sister city relationship between Stillwater and Kameoka, Japan. The gardeners shipped 22 tons of materials, tools, and supplies to Stillwater from Japan. Over a two-week period, they constructed a traditional Japanese garden. They also built a small tea garden at OSU's Oklahoma Botanical Garden and Arboretum. The International Friendship Garden was dedicated on Sunday, July 26, 1998, with a delegation from Kameoka in attendance.

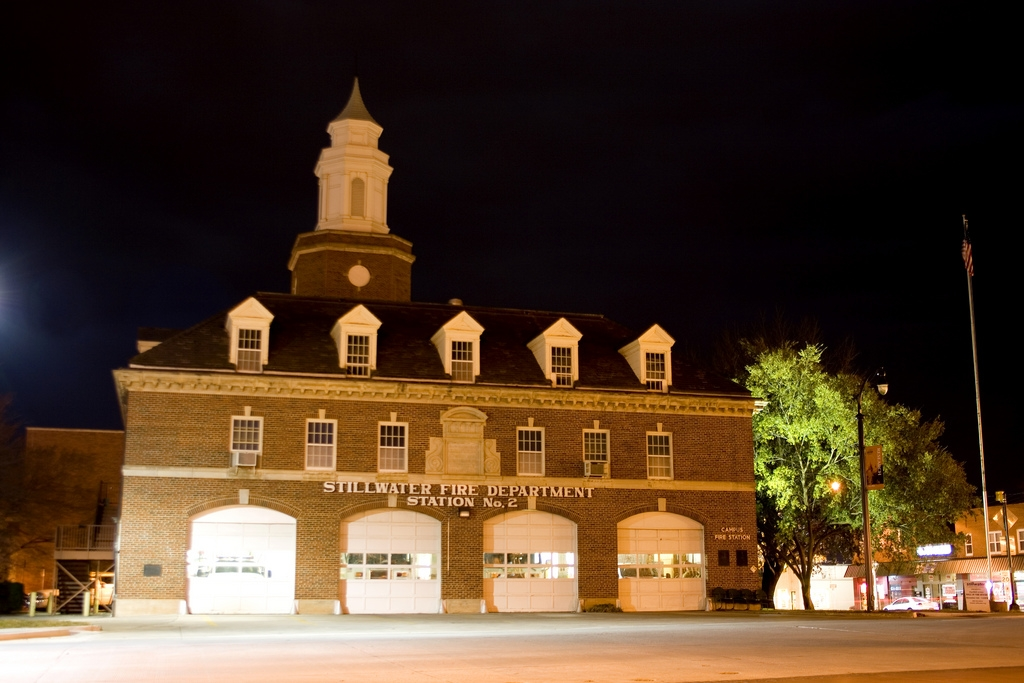
Campus Fire Station

The Stillwater Public Library dedicated a bronze statue of Oklahoma historian and author Angie Debo on November 18, 2010. Created by local artist Phyllis Mantik, the statue depicts a young Debo sitting on a rock with several books by her side. Mantik chose to depict the historian as a young woman to illustrate that, at an early age, she chose the life of a scholar. To highlight Debo's importance to Oklahoma's Native American community, the base of the statue is surrounded by the seals of Oklahoma's 38 federally recognized Native American tribes.

The first Sonic Drive-In location was opened in Stillwater in 1959 by Troy Smith of the Shawnee, Oklahoma-based Top Hat Drive-In. The restaurant, now remodeled, is at 215 N Main St, and features the original sign as well as a statue of the first franchise manager, Gene Longworth.

Payne County's Grandest Elm Tree is located in Stillwater. It has gained large attention from bystanders and neighbors of the attraction.

The Stillwater Farmers' Market operates April through October on Wednesdays and Saturdays.

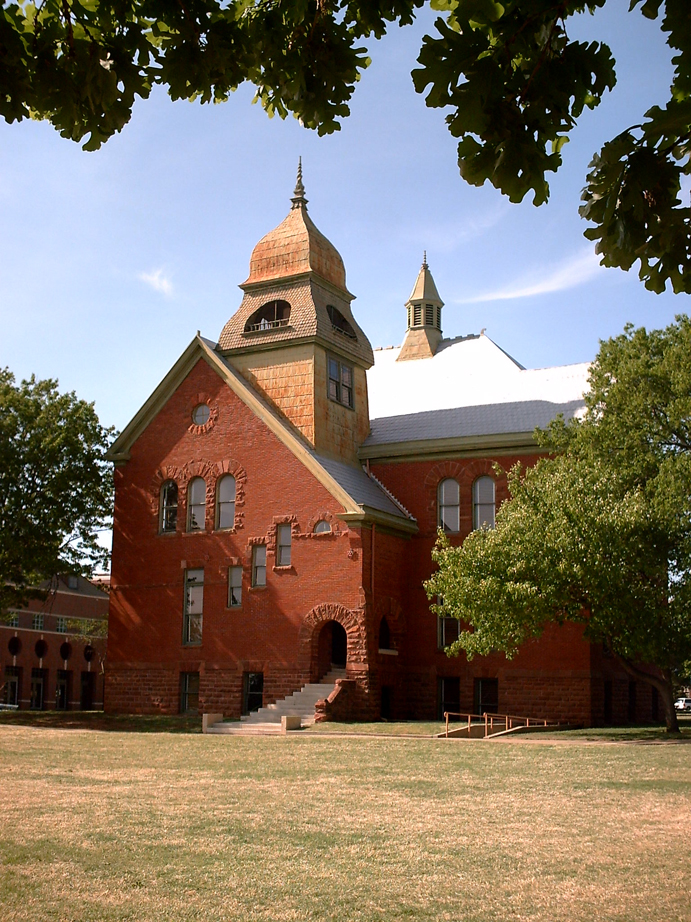
Old Central

The following Stillwater sites are listed on the National Register of Historic Places:

- James E. Berry House (502 S. Duck St.)
- Campus Fire Station (600 W. University Ave.)
- Citizens Bank Building (107 E. 9th Ave.)
- Cottonwood Community Center (N.W. of Stillwater)
- William Frick House (1016 S. West St.)
- Hoke Building (121 W. 7th Ave.)
- Josephine Reifsnyder Lustron House (2119 Sherwood)
- Magruder Plots (Oklahoma State University-Stillwater)
- Murphy House (419 S. Monroe St.)
- Oklahoma A & M College Agronomy Barn and Seed House (2902 W. 6th St. Building #610)
- Old Central (Oklahoma State University-Stillwater)
- Payne County Courthouse (606 S. Husband St.)
- Pleasant Valley School (1901 S. Sangre Rd.)
- Selph Building (119 W. 7th Ave.)
- Santa Fe Depot (400 E. 10th Ave.)
- Walker Building (117 W. 7th Ave.)

== Media ==
Stillwater's newspaper of record is the NewsPress, owned by the Community Newspaper Holdings, Inc. The community is also served by the weekly Stillwater Journal, owned and published by David and Lisa Sasser. The Daily O'Collegian has been published since 1895 as a daily paper by Oklahoma State University and is an affiliate of the College Media Network.

Stillwater is also home to several radio stations, including Stillwater Radio that broadcasts on four stations: KSPI 780 AM, 80s, 90s and 2000s Rock; KSPI 94.3 FM, 80s, 90s and 2000s Rock; KVRO 101.1 FM, classic hits and home of Stillwater High School sports; KGFY 105.5 FM, country music and the home of Perkins-Tryon High School sports (in nearby Perkins, Oklahoma), and OSU women's basketball, soccer, and softball; and KSPI 93.7 FM, adult contemporary, and the home of OSU football, baseball, men's basketball, and wrestling. KOSU 91.7 FM is owned by Oklahoma State University and is a National Public Radio station.

White Peacock Publishing publishes Stillwater Living Magazine, a full-color monthly magazine. Stillwater Scene, published by Red Productions, is a monthly print and online magazine that focuses on local entertainment.

Stillwater TV is a government-access television station airing on Suddenlink Communications’s channel 14. It broadcasts programming provided by the City of Stillwater, including live and rebroadcasts of Stillwater City Council and Planning Commission meetings.

Stillwater citizens were featured in the news for threatening fellow citizens attempting to enforce public safety regulations related to COVID-19, "just three hours [after] the rule going into effect".

== Sports ==
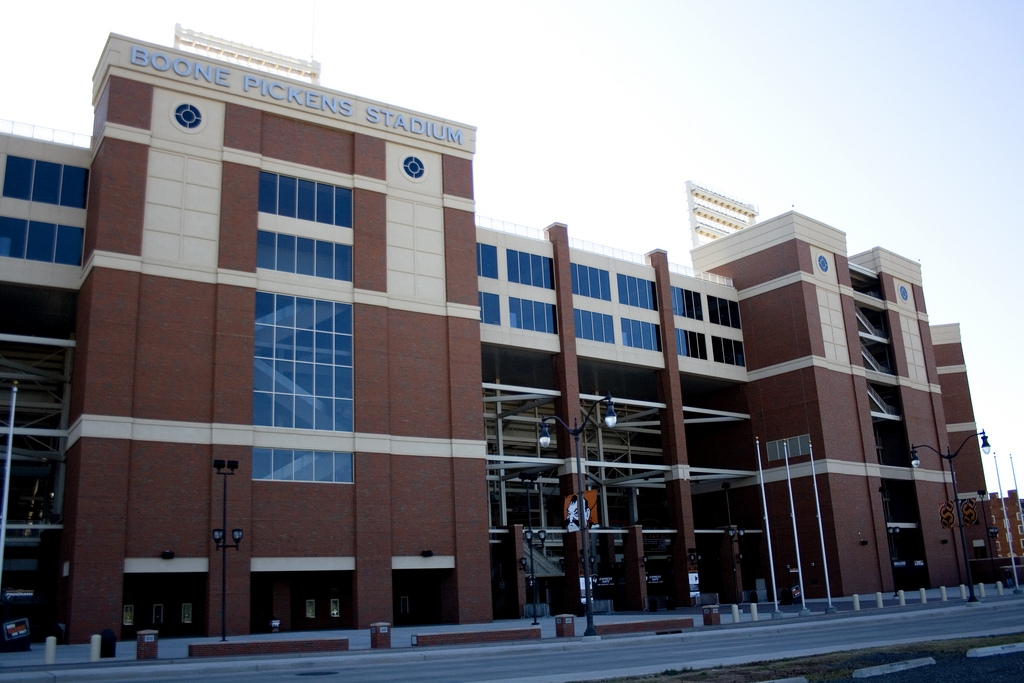
Boone Pickens Stadium

Stillwater is home to the Oklahoma State Cowboys and Cowgirls. Oklahoma State University teams have won 53 NCAA National Championships. Men's programs include baseball, basketball, football, cross country, golf, wrestling, tennis, and track and field. Women's programs include basketball, cross country, equestrian, soccer, softball, tennis, and track and field. The Oklahoma State Cowboys wrestling team is an NCAA Division I wrestling program and is one of five Big 12 Conference schools that participate in wrestling. The team has won 34 team national championships (plus an additional three, which are unofficial) and 134 individual NCAA championships, which are both NCAA records. Major sports facilities include Boone Pickens Stadium, Gallagher-Iba Arena, and O'Brate Stadium.

Stillwater High School is a 6A-2 school. The Pioneers compete in football, volleyball, softball, cross country, cheerleading, pom, wrestling, basketball, swimming, baseball, golf, tennis, and soccer.

== Parks and outdoor attractions ==
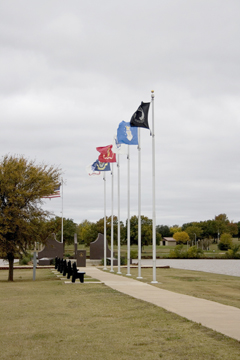
Trail around Boomer Lake

The City of Stillwater Parks and Recreation Department manages more than 5,000 acres (20 km^{2}) of parkland, including five ball complexes, ten tennis courts, two disc golf courses, four lakes, one swimming pool, 14 playgrounds, one skate and bmx bike ramp, special services centers, including the Multi Arts Center, Senior Activity Center, Community Center, Armory Gymnasium and Lakeside Golf Course.

Lake McMurtry, owned by the City of Stillwater, offers hiking and mountain-bike trails, back-to-nature camping and well-stocked reserves for fishing. Its convenience store and bait shop are open seasonal hours.

Carl Blackwell Lake is owned by Oklahoma State University. It offers camping, boat rentals, covered pavilions, and a gift shop.

Stillwater is served by a number of paved and unpaved bicycle and walking trails for non-motorized forms of transit. The Kameoka Trail Corridor includes a three-mile (5 km) loop around Boomer Lake and additional disconnected segments throughout the city. The corridor begins north at Park View Estates and runs along West Boomer Creek toward Airport Road and Boomer Lake Park, circles the lake and cuts south to Stillwater High School, crosses McElroy and continues to Hall of Fame between Main and Perkins and crosses through Hoyt Grove Park.

Other multi-use trails include an asphalt trail through Couch Park, a dirt nature trail around Sanborn Lake, bike and pedestrian trails at Lake McMurtry, and a one-mile (1.6 km) gravel screenings loop at the Oklahoma Technology & Research Park.

Four golf courses are located in Stillwater:

- The 18-hole course at the Karsten Creek Golf Club features 7,095 yards of golf from the longest tees for a par of 72. The course rating is 74.8 and it has a slope rating of 142 on Zoysia grass.
- The 18-hole Lakeside Memorial Golf Course features 6,698 yards of golf from the longest tees for a par of 70. The course rating is 71.3 and it has a slope rating of 117.
- The 18-hole course at the Stillwater Country Club features 6,524 yards of golf from the longest tees for a par of 70. The course rating is 71.0 and it has a slope rating of 125.
- The 18-hole course at The Links At Stillwater features 6,258 yards of golf from the longest tees for a par of 71.

== Transportation ==
=== Major highways ===
Stillwater has two highways running through it: Oklahoma State Highway 51, or 6th Avenue, runs east and west; and US-177, or Perkins Road, runs north and south. The city is also served by a 7.2-mile (11.6 km) spur that connects US-177 to the Cimarron Turnpike.

=== Airport ===
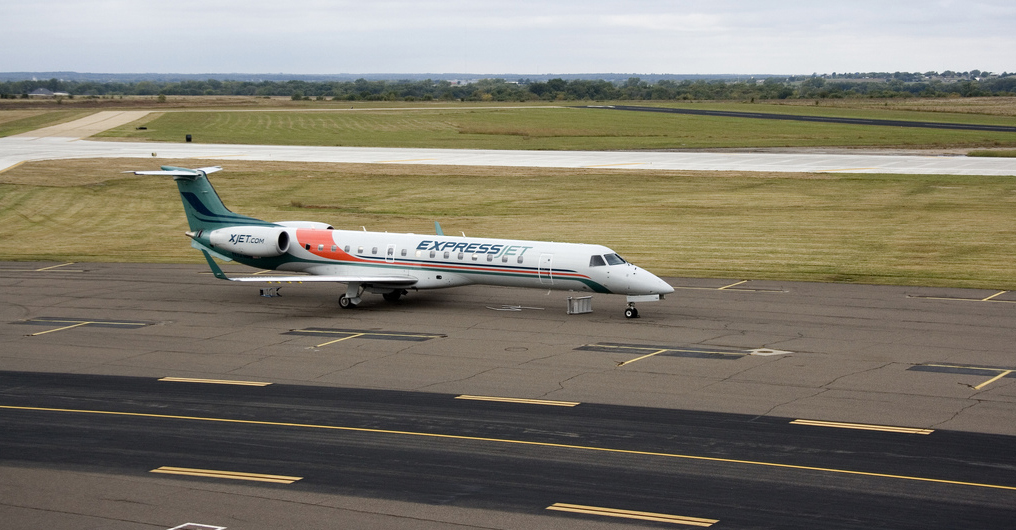
Stillwater Regional Airport

Stillwater Regional Airport (SWO) has served the city since 1917. American Airlines began service in August 2016 with two daily round trip flights to its largest hub at Dallas/Fort Worth International Airport. The flights are operated on behalf of American Airlines by their regional partner SkyWest Airlines using the 65 seat Bombardier CRJ700. Private jets also fly in and out of this airport.

=== Bus service ===
Public transportation is provided by OSU-Stillwater Community Transit. Ten bus routes are operated within Stillwater's city limits and on the OSU campus.

== Infrastructure ==
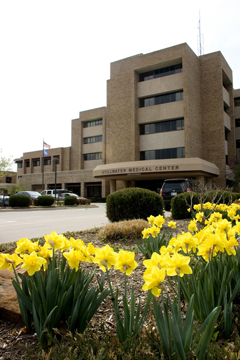
Stillwater Medical Center

=== Utilities ===
Stillwater has been a community-owned electric utility since 1907. The electric utility, now part of the Stillwater Utilities Authority, provides electric, water, wastewater and solid waste management services. A portion of the Utility Authority's revenues help to support the City of Stillwater's fire and police departments, the parks and recreation system, and other city services. Water in Stillwater is drawn from Kaw Lake and pumped approximately 40 miles (64 km) to the treatment facility.

=== Health care ===
Stillwater Medical Center is a 119-bed non-profit public trust facility. Services offered by the hospital include emergency, wound care, labor and delivery, surgery, radiology, rehabilitation, cancer care, and wellness.

The community is also served by the Stillwater Surgery Center, an outpatient surgery center, and the Stillwater Cancer Center, a physician-owned cancer treatment center. Residents who seek the full services of a teaching hospital must travel to the OSU Medical Center, about 60–70 minutes east in Tulsa.

The Payne County Health Department is also located in Stillwater and offers services such as WIC, consumer protection, health promotion, and chronic and acute disease services.

== Notable people ==
- Art Acord, (1890–1931), rodeo champion, Hollywood cowboy movie star
- Xavier Adibi, former professional football player
- Ai (or Ai Ogawa) (1947–2010), poet, recipient of the 1999 National Book Award for Poetry
- The All-American Rejects, band formed in Stillwater in 1999
- Frank K. Berry, chess administrator/organizer
- Garth Brooks, singer and songwriter
- Bob Childers, folk musician, father of red dirt music
- Ben Cline (born 1972), U.S. representative for Virginia
- Burr DeBenning (1936–2003), actor (A Nightmare on Elm Street 5: The Dream Child, Matlock, Magnum, P.I., Rockford Files, Columbo)
- Angie Debo (1890–1988), historian of Native American and Oklahoma history
- Robert DoQui (1934–1998), actor (Coffy, RoboCop)
- Julian Ewell (1915–2009), lieutenant general, U.S. Army
- Sean Patrick Flanery, actor, The Boondock Saints, Nefarious
- Wyatt Flores, country artist
- Edward C. Gallagher (1887–1940) Hall of Fame, Olympic and NCAA Champion Wrestling Coach, champion sprinter and football player.
- Willis "Blue Scuti" Gibson, classic Tetris player, first person to "beat" the game
- Chester Gould (1900–1985), cartoonist, creator of Dick Tracy
- Labron Harris Jr., pro golfer, 1962 U.S. Amateur champion
- Jackson Holliday, professional baseball player
- Josh Holliday, baseball coach
- Matt Holliday, professional baseball player
- Viktor Hovland, professional golfer
- Howard Keys, former professional football player and coach
- Brad Leftwich, old-time fiddler
- James Marsden, actor (X-Men, 30 Rock, Westworld)
- Sharron Miller, Emmy Award winning television and film director, producer, and writer
- Tyson Ritter, musician and actor, frontman of The All-American Rejects
- Jackie Shipp, professional football player and college coach
- Artie Smith, former professional football player
- Lawrence "Larry" Thompson (1911–1973), author, humor columnist at The Miami Herald
- Rex Tillerson, former U.S. Secretary of State, former chairman and CEO of ExxonMobil
- Payton Tolle, professional baseball pitcher
- Ab Wright, former Major League Baseball player

== Sister cities ==
- Kameoka, Kyoto Prefecture, Japan

Stillwater has been sister city to Kameoka since 1985. The State of Oklahoma and Kyoto Prefecture signed a sister state agreement in 1985 through the auspices of the governor's office. Kameoka requested a sister city in Oklahoma that was about one hour from the capital, agriculturally based, and home to a university. Stillwater was a perfect match. In 1985, the first delegation from Kameoka visited Stillwater, and in November of that same year a Stillwater delegation went to Kameoka. There, Mayors Calvin J. Anthony and Yoshihisa Taniguchi signed the Sister City Affiliation Agreement that officially established the sister cities relationship between the two cities.

Since 1989, the Stillwater Middle School and Taisei Junior High School in Kameoka have participated in a sister school relationship, which features an active teacher-student exchange program. In 2016, the Stillwater High School based string quintet, Penta-Strings (Jiwoo “Joseph” Sim, Aaron Park, Meghana Fathepure, Laura Deng, and Andrew Topham), played for the during the 30-year visit of the Kameoka delegation.

- Gadabay, Azerbaijan

== In popular culture ==
Stillwater was featured in the CW television show Supernatural in Season 13, Episode 12 "Various & Sundry Villains". Protagonists Sam and Dean Winchester track a pair of witches to the city to try and recover a valuable spell book.

In the 2021 film Stillwater, Matt Damon plays an oil rig worker from Oklahoma who goes to visit his daughter in prison in Marseille, France, in the hope to bring her back home to Stillwater.

Stillwater served as the filming location for the crime-thriller All-American Murder starring Christopher Walken.

Stillwater appears in the disaster film Twisters, released in 2024 as a standalone sequel to the 1996 film Twister.
