= Oklahoma State University System =

University system in Stillwater, Oklahoma, U.S.

- Type: Public university system
- Established: 1946; 80 years ago
- Endowment: $1.48 billion (FY2024)
- Budget: $1.89 billion (FY2026)
- President: James D. Hess
- Students: 36, 934 (Fall 2025)
- Location: Stillwater, Oklahoma, U.S.
- Campus: 4 Universities; 1 Health Sciences Center

Oklahoma State University System Locations

The Oklahoma State University System (OSU System) is a public university system in Oklahoma comprising five educational institutions: four general academic universities and one health sciences center. The system's flagship institution is the Oklahoma State University campus in Stillwater. As of Fall 2023, the OSU System is the largest university system in the state of Oklahoma with a total enrollment of 34,455 students.

Two state agencies, OSU Ag Research and the Oklahoma Cooperative Extension Service, are also operated by the system and administered through Oklahoma State University–Stillwater.

== Institutions ==
Institution	Location	Type	Founded	Enrollment (Fall 2023)
Oklahoma State University	Stillwater	Academic	1890	26,008 (Note: Enrollment data for OSU–Stillwater also includes the 2,648 students of OSU–Tulsa.)
Oklahoma State University Institute of Technology	Okmulgee	Academic	1946	2,483
Oklahoma State University–Oklahoma City	Oklahoma City	Academic	1961	4,140
Oklahoma State University–Tulsa	Tulsa	Academic	1999	2,648
Oklahoma State University Center for Health Sciences	Tulsa	Health	1972	1,824
