= National Register of Historic Places listings in Payne County, Oklahoma =

Location of Payne County in Oklahoma

This is a list of the National Register of Historic Places listings in Payne County, Oklahoma.

This is intended to be a complete list of the properties and districts on the National Register of Historic Places in Payne County, Oklahoma, United States. The locations of National Register properties and districts for which the latitude and longitude coordinates are included below, may be seen in a map.

There are 33 properties and districts listed on the National Register in the county.

This National Park Service list is complete through NPS recent listings posted February 27, 2026.

== Current listings ==
	Name on the Register	Image	Date listed	Location	City or town	Description
1	The Bassett House	The Bassett House	December 3, 2009 (#09000979)	1100 E. 9th Pl. 35°58′20″N 96°45′23″W	Cushing	
2	James E. Berry House	James E. Berry House	November 21, 1980 (#80003294)	502 S. Duck St. 36°06′59″N 97°03′44″W	Stillwater	
3	Luke D. Berry House	Luke D. Berry House	December 11, 2007 (#07001262)	621 E. Broadway St. 35°58′47″N 96°45′55″W	Cushing	
4	Campus Fire Station	Campus Fire Station	December 7, 2004 (#04001336)	600 W. University Ave. 36°07′12″N 97°03′54″W	Stillwater	
5	Citizens Bank Building	Citizens Bank Building	February 24, 1981 (#81000467)	107 E. 9th St. 36°06′46″N 97°03′29″W	Stillwater	
6	Cottonwood Community Center	Cottonwood Community Center	March 13, 1980 (#80004291)	Northwest of Stillwater; 36°08′43″N 97°09′29″W	Stillwater	
7	Hamilton Cross House	Hamilton Cross House	June 9, 2014 (#14000298)	1509 W. 9th 36°06′42″N 97°04′35″W	Stillwater	
8	Cushing American Legion Building	Cushing American Legion Building	June 5, 2003 (#03000514)	212 S. Noble; 35°58′41″N 96°46′10″W	Cushing	
9	Cushing Armory	Cushing Armory	May 20, 1994 (#94000480)	218 S. Little Ave. 35°58′42″N 96°46′00″W	Cushing	
10	William Frick House	William Frick House	September 8, 1980 (#80004292)	1016 S. West St. 36°06′36″N 97°03′47″W	Stillwater	
11	Gillespie Drilling Company Building	Gillespie Drilling Company Building	December 12, 2012 (#12001039)	317 W. Broadway; 35°58′47″N 96°46′33″W	Cushing	
12	Hoke Building	Hoke Building	September 12, 1983 (#83002118)	121 W. 7th Ave. 36°06′51″N 97°03′34″W	Stillwater	
13	Hopkins Sandstone House and Farmstead		May 7, 1979 (#79002017)	Northeast of Ripley; 36°02′30″N 96°51′42″W	Ripley	
14	Hotel Cushing		March 6, 2026 (#100012779)	214 East Broadway; 35°58′48″N 96°46′15″W	Cushing	
15	Irvings Castle		February 17, 1978 (#78002257)	2.5 miles (4.0 km) south of Ingalls; 36°03′46″N 96°53′33″W	Ingalls	
16	Long Branch Creek Bridge	Long Branch Creek Bridge	September 10, 2014 (#14000596)	1/8 mi. N. of jct. of N3300 & E0540; 36°13′54″N 97°06′21″W	Stillwater vicinity	
17	Lytton Building-Masonic Hall	Lytton Building-Masonic Hall	June 7, 2021 (#100006630)	907-909 South Main St. 36°06′43″N 97°03′31″W	Stillwater	
18	Magruder Plots	Magruder Plots	August 29, 1979 (#79002018)	Oklahoma State University; 36°07′01″N 97°05′15″W	Stillwater	
19	Murphy House	Murphy House	September 18, 1986 (#86002173)	419 S. Monroe; 36°07′00″N 97°04′16″W	Stillwater	
20	Oklahoma A & M College Agronomy Barn and Seed House	Oklahoma A & M College Agronomy Barn and Seed House	May 27, 2004 (#04000519)	2902 W. 6th St. Building #610; 36°07′02″N 97°05′37″W	Stillwater	
21	Oklahoma A&M College Dairy Barn		December 10, 2014 (#14001030)	2624 W. McElroy Rd. 36°07′50″N 97°05′17″W	Stillwater	
22	Old Central, Oklahoma State University	Old Central, Oklahoma State University	July 27, 1971 (#71000672)	Oklahoma State University campus 36°07′14″N 97°03′59″W	Stillwater	
23	Payne County Courthouse	Payne County Courthouse	August 23, 1984 (#84003410)	606 S. Husband St. 36°06′55″N 97°03′37″W	Stillwater	
24	Perkins Downtown Historic District	Perkins Downtown Historic District	December 28, 2000 (#00001578)	100 block of Main St. bounded by Stumbo and Thomas Sts. 35°58′24″N 97°02′01″W	Perkins	
25	Pleasant Valley School	Pleasant Valley School	January 25, 1991 (#90002182)	1901 S. Sangre Rd. 36°06′02″N 97°06′16″W	Stillwater	
26	Pruett House		September 7, 2016 (#16000622)	155 Redwood Dr. 36°07′12″N 97°04′36″W	Stillwater	
27	Josephine Reifsnyder Lustron House	Josephine Reifsnyder Lustron House	February 23, 2009 (#09000078)	2119 Sherwood; 36°07′19″N 97°05′04″W	Stillwater	
28	Selph Building	Selph Building	September 12, 1983 (#83002119)	119 W. 7th Ave. 36°06′51″N 97°03′33″W	Stillwater	
29	Stillwater Santa Fe Depot	Stillwater Santa Fe Depot	March 3, 1980 (#80004293)	400 E. 10th St. 36°06′46″N 97°03′16″W	Stillwater	
30	Jim Thorpe House	Jim Thorpe House	March 24, 1971 (#71000673)	704 E. Boston St. 36°06′49″N 96°48′38″W	Yale	As of mid-2024, a museum owned by the Thorpe family.
31	Christian K. Usher Luston House	Christian K. Usher Luston House	February 23, 2009 (#09000079)	1135 E. Moses; 35°58′52″N 96°45′21″W	Cushing	
32	Walker Building	Walker Building	September 12, 1983 (#83002120)	117 W. 7th Ave. 36°06′51″N 97°03′33″W	Stillwater	
33	White Cloud Lodge	White Cloud Lodge	September 3, 2010 (#10000619)	820 E. 146th St. 35°56′57″N 97°02′53″W	Perkins	

== See also ==
- List of National Historic Landmarks in Oklahoma
- National Register of Historic Places listings in Oklahoma
