= Payne County, Oklahoma =

County in Oklahoma, United States

- County
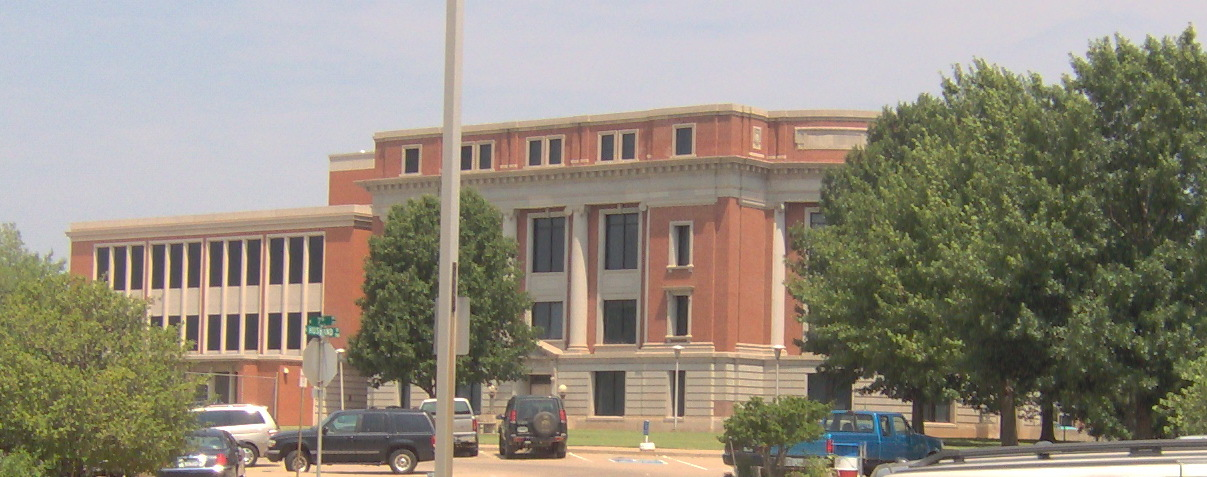
- Payne County Courthouse

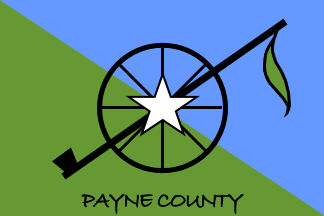
- Flag Seal

- Location within the U.S. state of Oklahoma
- Coordinates: 36°05′N 96°58′W
- Country: United States
- State: Oklahoma
- Founded: May 2, 1890
- Named for: Capt. David L. Payne
- Seat: Stillwater
- Largest city: Stillwater

Area
  - Total: 697 sq mi (1,810 km^{2})
  - Land: 685 sq mi (1,770 km^{2})
  - Water: 12 sq mi (31 km^{2})

Population (2020)
  - Total: 81,646
  - Estimate (2025): 83,889 ▲
  - Density: 119/sq mi (46.0/km^{2})
- Time zone: UTC−6 (Central)
  - Summer (DST): UTC−5 (CDT)
- Congressional district: 3rd
- Website: www.paynecounty.org

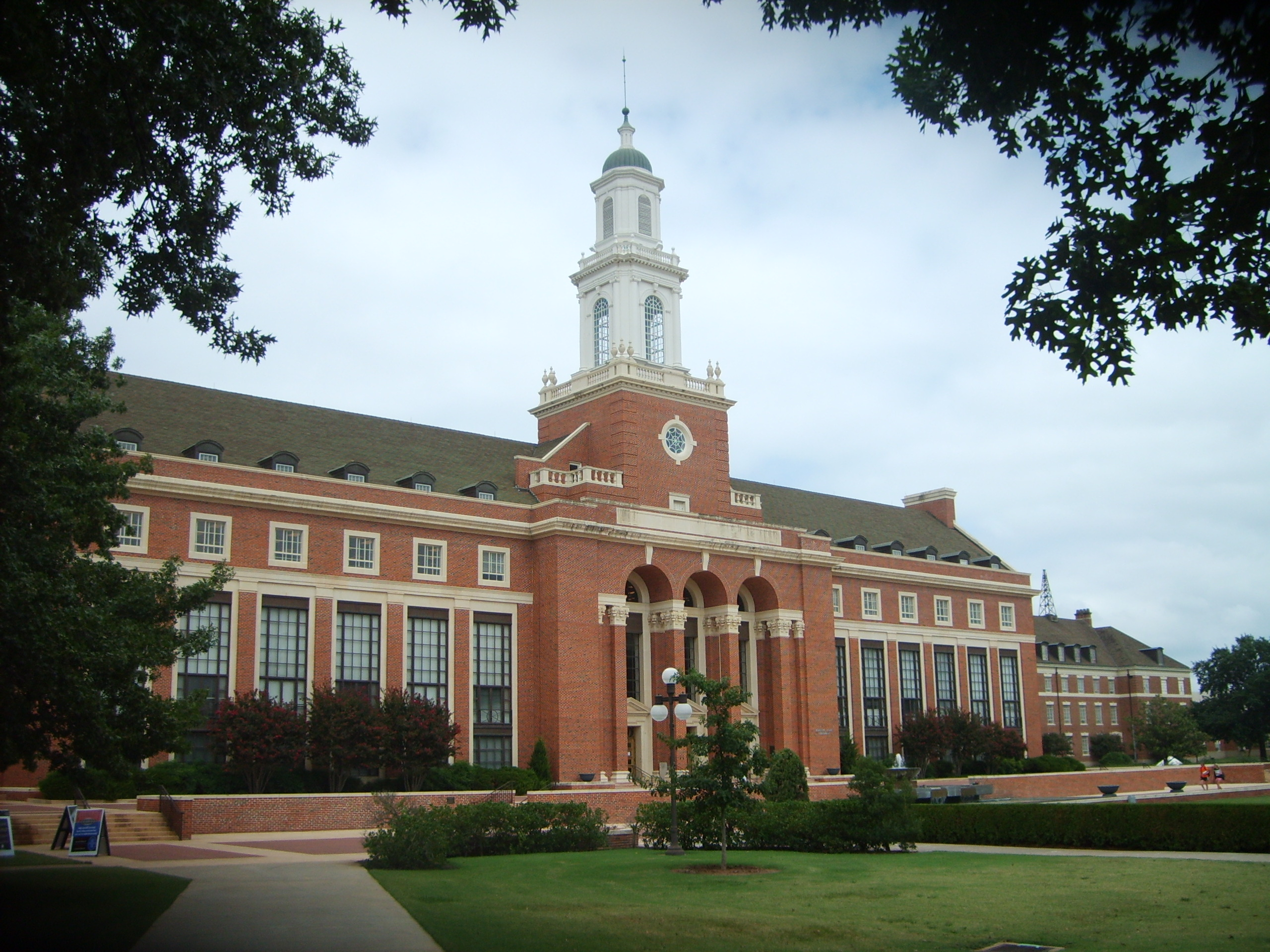
Edmon Low Library, OSU

Payne County is the eighth-most populous county located in the U.S. state of Oklahoma. As of the 2020 census, its population was 81,646. Its county seat is Stillwater. The county was created in 1890 as part of Oklahoma Territory and is named for Capt. David L. Payne, a leader of the "Boomers".

Payne County comprises the Stillwater, OK Micropolitan Statistical Area. The county lies northeast of the Oklahoma City metropolitan area although some consider it an extension of the Oklahoma City metro area due to commuter patterns and other indicators.

== History ==
This county was established and named as the Sixth County by the Oklahoma Organic Act of 1890. It included land settled during the Land Run of 1889. The Organic Act settled a dispute between the towns of Stillwater and Perkins over which should be the county seat.

Eastern Oklahoma Railway built two lines in Payne County between 1900 and 1902, then immediately leased them to the Atchison, Topeka and Santa Fe Railway. The historic civil townships of the county were abolished by 1930. One north–south line ran between Pawnee, Stillwater, Ripley and Cushing before joining another north–south line that from Newark to Shawnee. Another line was built from Guthrie along the Cimarron River to Ripley. These lines were important in getting crops from farm to market.

In 2010, the Keystone-Cushing Pipeline (Phase II) was constructed into Payne County.

== Geography ==
According to the U.S. Census Bureau, the county has a total area of 697 square miles (1,810 km^{2}), of which 685 square miles (1,770 km^{2}) is land and 12 square miles (31 km^{2}) (1.8%) is water.

Payne County is covered by rolling plains, mostly within the Sandstone Hills physiographic region, but with the western part of the county in the Red Bed plains. The county has two significant reservoirs: Lake McMurtry and Lake Carl Blackwell. The Cimarron River and Stillwater Creek drain most of the county.

=== Transit ===
- OSU-Stillwater Community Transit

=== Major highways ===
- Interstate 35
- U.S. Highway 177
- U.S. Highway 412 / Cimarron Turnpike
- State Highway 18
- State Highway 33
- State Highway 51
- State Highway 86
- State Highway 99
- State Highway 108

=== Airports ===
- KSWO - Stillwater Regional Airport, Commercial service to Dallas via American Airlines
- KCUH - Cushing Municipal Airport

=== Adjacent counties ===
- Noble County (northwest)
- Pawnee County (northeast)
- Creek County (east)
- Lincoln County (south)
- Logan County (southwest)

== Demographics ==
Historical population
Census	Pop.	Note	%±
1890	7,215		—
1900	20,909		189.8%
1910	23,735		13.5%
1920	30,180		27.2%
1930	36,905		22.3%
1940	36,057		−2.3%
1950	46,430		28.8%
1960	44,231		−4.7%
1970	50,654		14.5%
1980	62,435		23.3%
1990	61,507		−1.5%
2000	68,190		10.9%
2010	77,350		13.4%
2020	81,646		5.6%
2025 (est.)	83,889	▲	2.7%
U.S. Decennial Census; 1790–1960 1900–1990; 1990–2000 2010–2019

=== 2021 estimates ===
According to 2021 census estimates, its median household income was $43,686 with a poverty rate of 20.7%.

=== 2020 census ===
As of the 2020 census, the county had a population of 81,646.

Of the residents, 18.6% were under the age of 18 and 13.3% were 65 years of age or older; the median age was 29.2 years. For every 100 females there were 101.8 males, and for every 100 females age 18 and over there were 101.2 males.

The racial makeup of the county was 74.3% White, 3.9% Black or African American, 4.7% American Indian and Alaska Native, 3.3% Asian, 2.3% from some other race, and 11.5% from two or more races. Hispanic or Latino residents of any race comprised 6.6% of the population.

There were 30,958 households in the county, of which 26.0% had children under the age of 18 living with them and 29.1% had a female householder with no spouse or partner present. About 32.2% of all households were made up of individuals and 9.8% had someone living alone who was 65 years of age or older.

There were 36,708 housing units, of which 15.7% were vacant. Among occupied housing units, 50.8% were owner-occupied and 49.2% were renter-occupied. The homeowner vacancy rate was 2.4% and the rental vacancy rate was 16.8%.

=== 2000 census ===
As of the census of 2000, there were 68,190 people, 26,680 households, and 15,314 families residing in the county. The population density was 99 inhabitants per square mile (38/km^{2}). There were 29,326 housing units at an average density of 43 units per square mile (17/km^{2}).

The racial makeup of the county was 84.33% White, 3.63% Black or African American, 4.58% Native American, 3.00% Asian, 0.04% Pacific Islander, 0.77% from other races, and 3.64% from two or more races. 2.15% of the population were Hispanic or Latino of any race.

Of the 26,680 households, 25.90% had children under the age of 18 living with them, 45.60% were married couples living together, 8.30% had a female householder with no husband present, and 42.60% were non-families. 30.10% of all households were made up of individuals, and 8.10% had someone living alone who was 65 years of age or older. The average household size was 2.29 and the average family size was 2.90.

In the county as of 2000, the population was spread out, with 19.60% under the age of 18, 25.90% from 18 to 24, 26.20% from 25 to 44, 17.60% from 45 to 64, and 10.80% who were 65 years of age or older. The median age was 28 years. For every 100 females, there were 103.30 males. For every 100 females age 18 and over, there were 102.60 males.

According to the 2000 census, the median income for a household in the county was $28,733, and the median income for a family was $40,823. Males had a median income of $31,132 versus $21,113 for females. The per capita income for the county was $15,983. About 10.80% of families and 20.30% of the population were below the poverty line, including 16.00% of those under age 18 and 8.50% of those age 65 or over.

== Politics ==
Payne County is very conservative for a county dominated by a college town. While many such counties swung hard to the Democrats in the 1990s, Payne County has gone Republican in every election since 1968 and all but twice since 1944. Since 1968, Southerners Jimmy Carter and Bill Clinton are the only Democrats to cross the 40 percent mark.

Voter Registration and Party Enrollment as of June 30, 2023
Party	Number of Voters	Percentage
Democratic	11,814	27.46%
Republican	22,548	52.42%
Others	8,655	20.12%
Total	43,017	100%

United States presidential election results for Payne County, Oklahoma
Year	Republican		Democratic		Third party(ies)	
Year	No.	%	No.	%	No.	%
1908	2,244	48.52%	1,980	42.81%	401	8.67%
1912	1,669	41.65%	1,534	38.28%	804	20.06%
1916	1,767	36.74%	2,140	44.50%	902	18.76%
1920	4,583	54.76%	3,238	38.69%	549	6.56%
1924	4,817	48.49%	4,342	43.71%	774	7.79%
1928	7,864	72.19%	2,904	26.66%	125	1.15%
1932	3,874	33.13%	7,819	66.87%	0	0.00%
1936	4,783	37.02%	8,081	62.54%	57	0.44%
1940	6,772	46.58%	7,704	52.99%	63	0.43%
1944	6,048	51.68%	5,624	48.06%	30	0.26%
1948	5,799	43.97%	7,390	56.03%	0	0.00%
1952	10,605	62.04%	6,490	37.96%	0	0.00%
1956	9,381	59.75%	6,320	40.25%	0	0.00%
1960	9,943	63.59%	5,694	36.41%	0	0.00%
1964	7,936	47.12%	8,906	52.88%	0	0.00%
1968	9,577	53.73%	5,772	32.38%	2,475	13.89%
1972	17,019	73.77%	5,644	24.46%	407	1.76%
1976	13,481	56.43%	9,987	41.81%	420	1.76%
1980	15,955	62.10%	7,466	29.06%	2,270	8.84%
1984	20,811	72.64%	7,653	26.71%	184	0.64%
1988	16,027	59.57%	10,568	39.28%	310	1.15%
1992	13,032	42.20%	9,886	32.01%	7,962	25.78%
1996	11,686	48.07%	9,985	41.08%	2,637	10.85%
2000	15,256	61.15%	9,319	37.36%	372	1.49%
2004	19,560	65.95%	10,101	34.05%	0	0.00%
2008	18,435	63.49%	10,601	36.51%	0	0.00%
2012	16,481	64.18%	9,198	35.82%	0	0.00%
2016	16,651	59.98%	8,788	31.66%	2,321	8.36%
2020	17,813	60.09%	10,904	36.78%	926	3.12%
2024	17,962	61.35%	10,560	36.07%	757	2.59%

== Economy ==
Agriculture was the basis of the county economy for more than 50 years. The primary crops were cotton, corn and wheat.

World War II caused hundreds of students at Oklahoma A & M to leave school for military service. To offset this loss to the local economy, civic and college leaders lobbied military officials and Oklahoma Senator Mike Monroney to have the school designated as a war training center. This resulted in the establishment of twelve training programs for the Navy, with nearly 40,000 people. The wartime experience showed local political leaders that it would be essential to diversify the county's economic base. They formed an Industrial Foundation to attract manufacturing plants and industrial jobs. This effort succeeded and accelerated an increase in population.

== Education ==
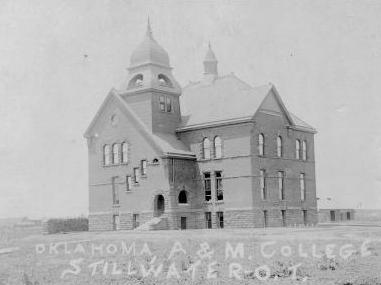
"Old Central", first building constructed for Oklahoma A&M College, c. 1894

Educational entities located in Payne County include:

- Oklahoma Department of Career and Technology Education
- Oklahoma State University-Stillwater
- Northern Oklahoma College
- Meridian Technology Center

== Communities ==
=== Cities ===
- Cushing
- Drumright (mainly in Creek County)
- Perkins
- Stillwater (county seat)
- Yale

=== Towns ===
- Glencoe
- Mulhall (mainly in Logan County)
- Orlando (partly in Logan County)
- Ripley

=== Census-designated places ===
- Ingalls
- Mehan
- Quay (partly in Pawnee County)

=== Other unincorporated communities ===
- Oak Grove
- Vinco
- Yost Lake

=== Fire Departments and Districts ===
Payne County is supported by a total of 11 fire departments, two of which are fully paid and staffed 24/7/365 (Cushing and Stillwater). All 11 departments in Payne County came together in October 2007 to sign a mutual aid agreement (Payne County Fire District Association), agreeing to support one another in times of need with manpower, equipment, and supplies. Additional automatics aid agreements have been signed by smaller groups of departments, automatically providing aid to one another for specific fire situations, such as structure fire calls, natural disasters, etc.

These departments are all supported by a portion (5%) of the Payne County 3/8 cent sales tax, which also supports the highways, a general fund, the Payne County Sheriff's Department, and Payne County Fairgrounds. This tax must be renewed every 5 years, and was last renewed in 2022.

- Coyle Volunteer Fire Department† (Coyle, OK | Volunteer)
- Cushing Fire Department (Cushing, OK | Paid Department)
- Drumright Fire‡ (Drumright, OK | Paid and Volunteer)
- Glencoe Fire Department (Glencoe, OK | Volunteer)
- Ingalls Fire District (Ingalls, OK | Volunteer)
- Mulhall Volunteer Fire Department (Mulhall,OK | Volunteer)
- Orlando Volunteer Fire Department† (Orlando, OK | Volunteer)
- Perkins Fire Department (Perkins, OK | Paid and Volunteer)
- Ripley Fire District (Ripley, OK | Volunteer)
- Stillwater Fire Department (Stillwater, OK | Paid Department)
- Yale Fire Department (Yale, OK | Volunteer)

† Primarily Located in Logan County, ‡ Primarily Located in Creek County

== NRHP sites ==
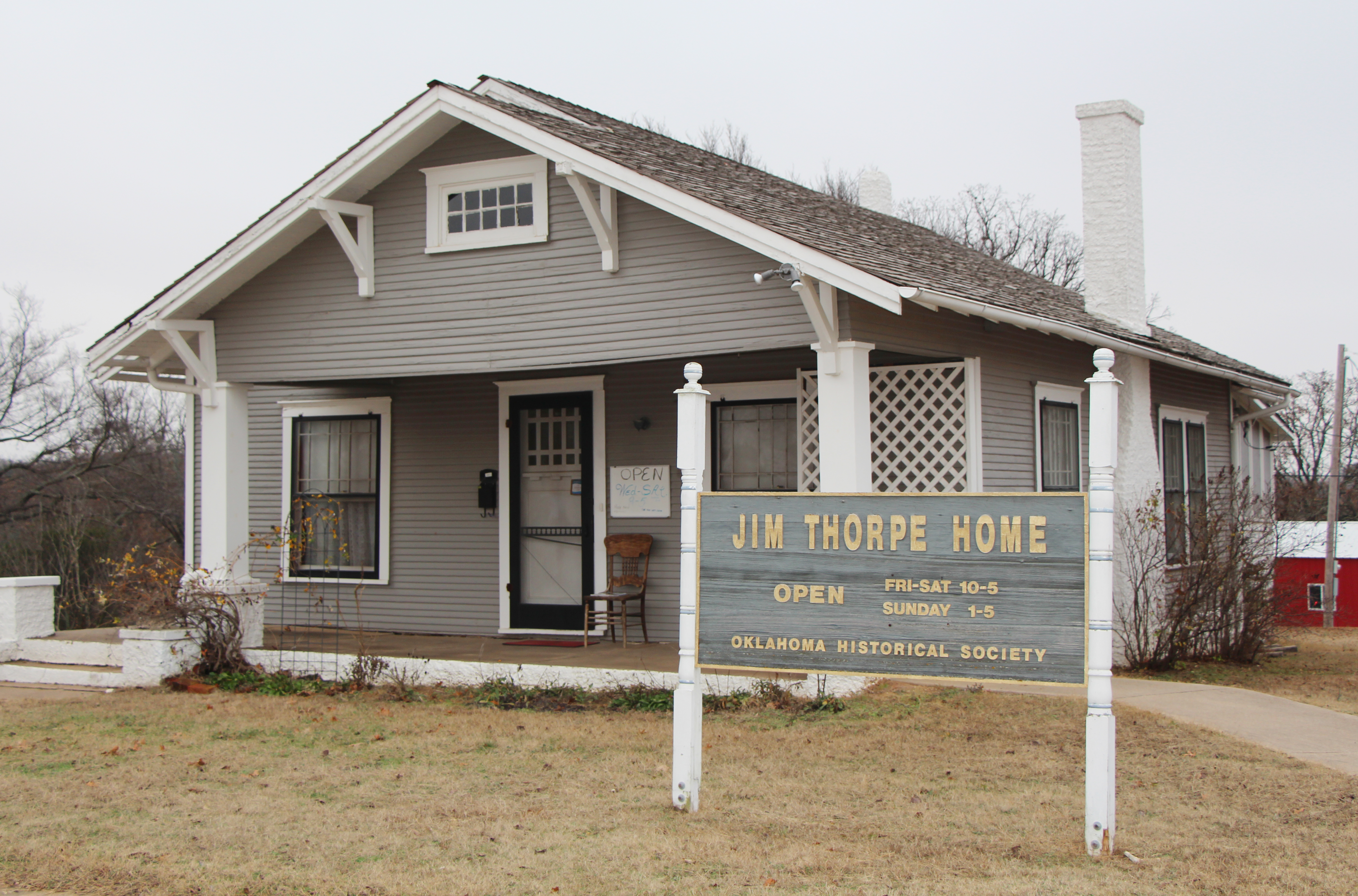
Jim Thorpe House, Yale

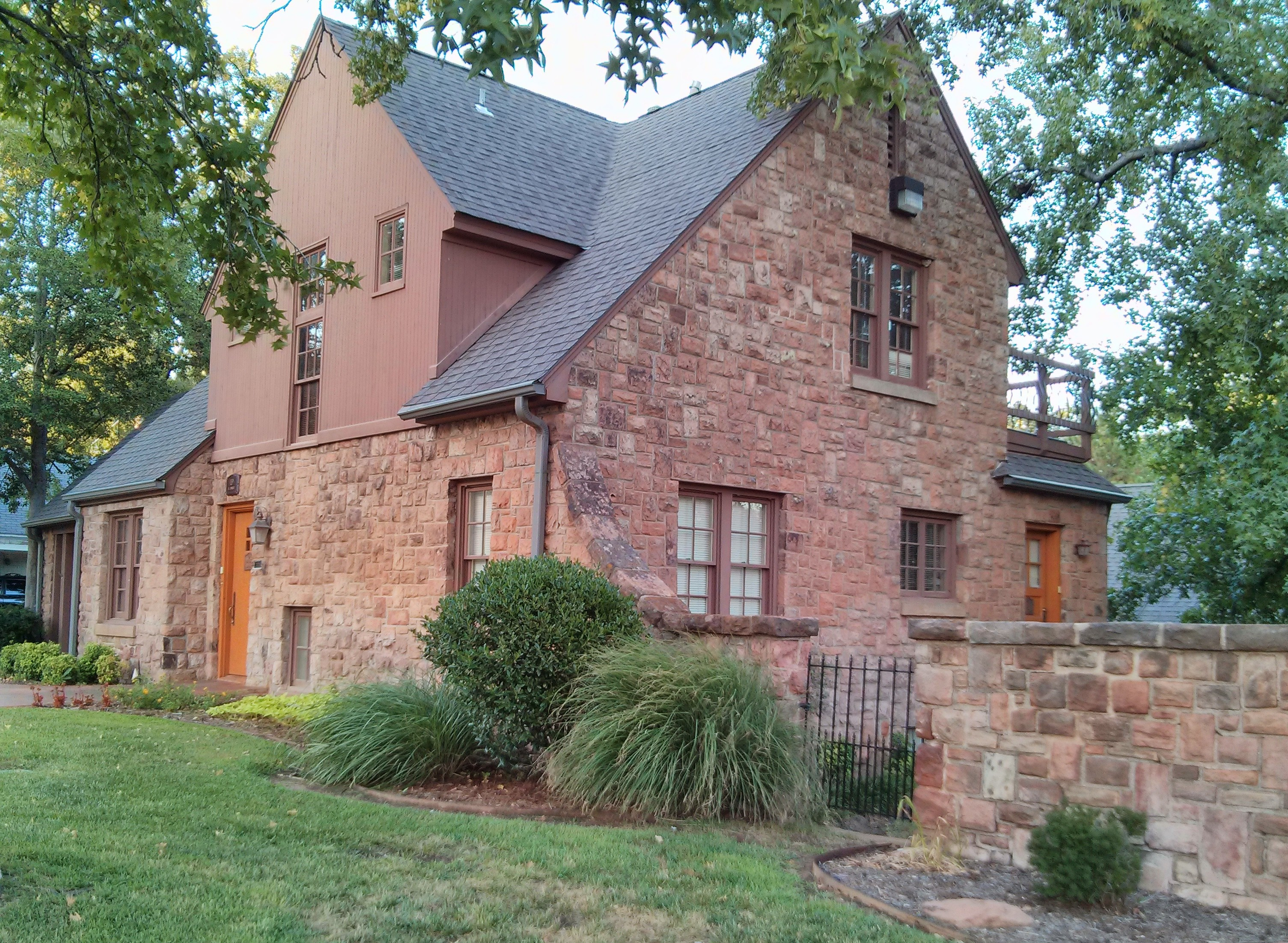
Murphy House, Stillwater

The following sites in Payne County are listed on the National Register of Historic Places:

- James E. Berry House, Stillwater
- Campus Fire Station, Stillwater
- Citizens Bank Building (Stillwater, Oklahoma), Stillwater
- Cottonwood Community Center, Stillwater
- Cushing American Legion Building, Cushing
- Cushing Armory, Cushing
- William Frick House, Stillwater
- Hoke Building, Stillwater
- Hopkins Sandstone House and Farmstead, Ripley
- Irvings Castle, Ingalls
- Josephine Reifsnyder Lustron House, Stillwater
- Magruder Plots, Stillwater
- Murphy House, Stillwater
- Oklahoma A & M College Agronomy Barn and Seed House, Stillwater
- Old Central, Oklahoma State University, Stillwater
- Payne County Courthouse, Stillwater
- Perkins Downtown Historic District, Perkins
- Pleasant Valley School, Stillwater
- Selph Building, Stillwater
- Stillwater Santa Fe Depot, Stillwater
- Jim Thorpe House, Yale
- Walker Building, Stillwater

Other landmarks include:

- Allen Williamson Bridge - Memorial bridge near Ripley, named after the Oklahoma Representative Allen Williamson.
