= Pleasant Valley School =

Pleasant Valley School may refer to:

- Pleasant Valley School (Bellvue, Colorado), listed on the NRHP in Colorado
- Pleasant Valley School (Branson, Colorado), listed on the NRHP in Colorado
- Pleasant Valley School (Kimberly, Idaho), listed on the NRHP in Idaho
- Pleasant Valley School (Stillwater, Oklahoma), listed on the NRHP in Oklahoma
- Pleasant Valley School District No. 2 (Wellsville, Kansas), listed on the NRHP in Kansas
