= Yale, Oklahoma =

- City
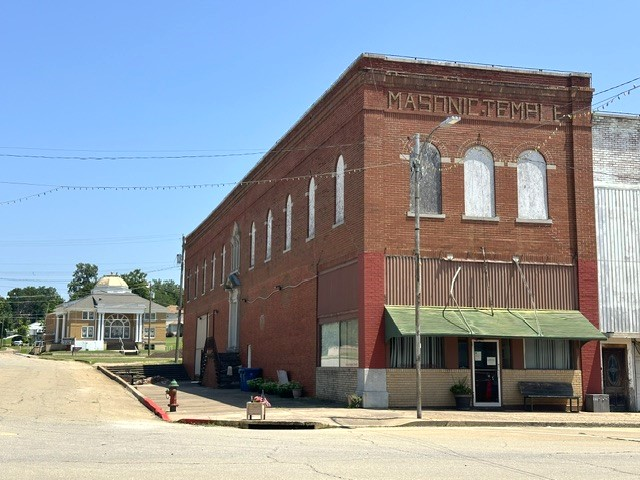
- In downtown Yale w/Masonic Temple on corner & domed First Baptist Church in background, as seen in July of 2026
- Motto: " Home Of Jim Thorpe "
- Location within Payne County and Oklahoma
- Coordinates: 36°06′55″N 96°42′04″W
- Country: United States
- State: Oklahoma
- County: Payne

Government
  - Type: Council-Manager
  - Mayor: Danea Reece (Mayor)

Area
  - Total: 0.92 sq mi (2.37 km^{2})
  - Land: 0.92 sq mi (2.37 km^{2})
  - Water: 0 sq mi (0.00 km^{2})
- Elevation: 804 ft (245 m)

Population (2020)
  - Total: 1,059
  - Density: 1,156/sq mi (446.4/km^{2})
- Time zone: UTC-6 (CST)
  - Summer (DST): UTC-5 (CDT)
- ZIP code: 74085
- Area code: 539/918
- FIPS code: 40-82500
- GNIS feature ID: 2412315
- Website: www.yaleok.org

Yale is a city in Payne County, Oklahoma, United States. The population was 1,059 at the 2020 census, a decline of 13.6 percent from the figure of 1,227 in 2010.

== History ==
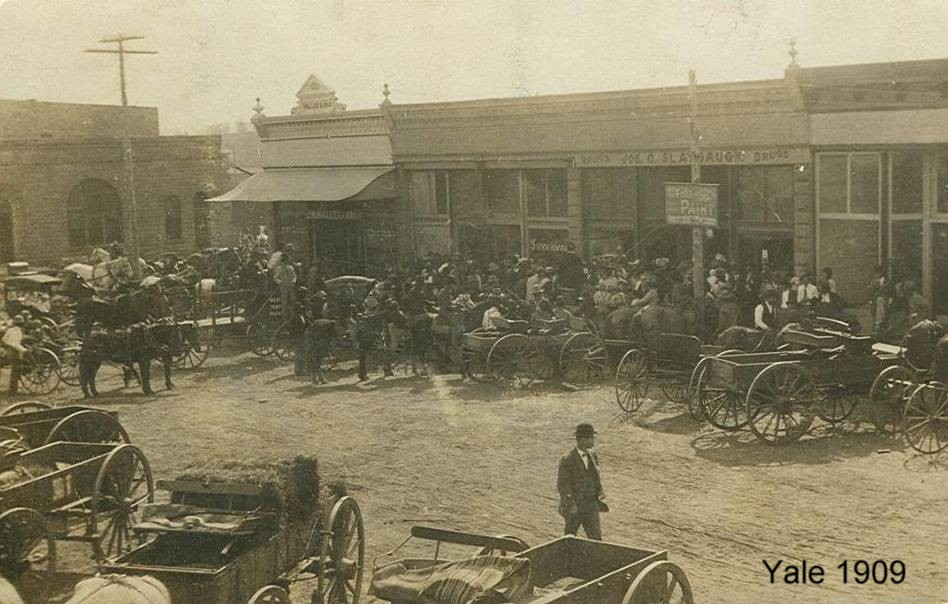
Historic Yale (1909)

Yale's founding in 1895 is attributed to a local farmer, Sterling F. Underwood, who established a post office by that name in his general store, about 1.5 miles (2.4 km) east of the present town. When the Eastern Oklahoma Railway built its line across Payne County, a group led by George W. Canfield began a different townsite also within Eagle Township that would be closer to the railroad, at its planned junction with the Missouri–Kansas–Texas Railroad. Underwood moved his store to the new site in 1902, making the new site the permanent location for the town of Yale. A 1907 map shows the town contained 230 acres surrounding the railroad junction, and to its east southeast the Underwood farm of 158 acres. By 1910, Yale had a population of 685, supported mostly by agricultural services and cotton processing.

On September 23, 1913, an oil well on the Randle farm produced a gusher. An even larger gusher began producing a month later. More discoveries followed. By the end of 1914, the combined Yale and Cushing fields were producing 220,000 barrels a day. The town boomed, attaining a population of 2,601 by the census of 1920.

The oil boom quickly deflated. Production began to decline sharply in 1915, and more dry holes were reported. Major producers began to shut down or reduce operations in the early 1920s. By 1930, the population had dropped to 1,734. In 1940, the census reported a population of 1,407. The decline continued until reaching a low of 1,239 in 1970. There was a spike by 1980, when the census recorded 1,652, but the downward trend resumed through 2010. Town officials have tried to stem the decline by promoting Yale as a retirement location.

== Geography ==
Yale is 20 miles (32 km) east of Stillwater on State Highway 51. According to the United States Census Bureau, the city has a total area of 0.9 square miles (2.3 km^{2}), all land.

The primary source of Yale's water supply is Lone Chimney Lake. The lake's level has been declining for several years because of prolonged drought conditions and high water consumption of water by Yale and other Oklahoma towns that rely on this lake as their primary source.

== Demographics ==
Historical population
Census	Pop.	Note	%±
1910	685		—
1920	2,601		279.7%
1930	1,734		−33.3%
1940	1,407		−18.9%
1950	1,359		−3.4%
1960	1,369		0.7%
1970	1,239		−9.5%
1980	1,652		33.3%
1990	1,392		−15.7%
2000	1,342		−3.6%
2010	1,227		−8.6%
2020	1,059		−13.7%
U.S. Decennial Census

=== 2020 census ===
As of the 2020 census, Yale had a population of 1,059. The median age was 34.6 years. 25.7% of residents were under the age of 18 and 16.9% of residents were 65 years of age or older. For every 100 females there were 94.3 males, and for every 100 females age 18 and over there were 88.7 males age 18 and over.

0% of residents lived in urban areas, while 100.0% lived in rural areas.

There were 427 households in Yale, of which 35.6% had children under the age of 18 living in them. Of all households, 42.4% were married-couple households, 16.6% were households with a male householder and no spouse or partner present, and 31.6% were households with a female householder and no spouse or partner present. About 28.8% of all households were made up of individuals and 13.8% had someone living alone who was 65 years of age or older.

There were 550 housing units, of which 22.4% were vacant. Among occupied housing units, 59.0% were owner-occupied and 41.0% were renter-occupied. The homeowner vacancy rate was 1.9% and the rental vacancy rate was 12.0%.

Racial composition as of the 2020 census
Race	Percent
White	79.9%
Black or African American	0.2%
American Indian and Alaska Native	6.7%
Asian	0.1%
Native Hawaiian and Other Pacific Islander	0%
Some other race	1.3%
Two or more races	11.8%
Hispanic or Latino (of any race)	4.1%

=== 2010 census ===
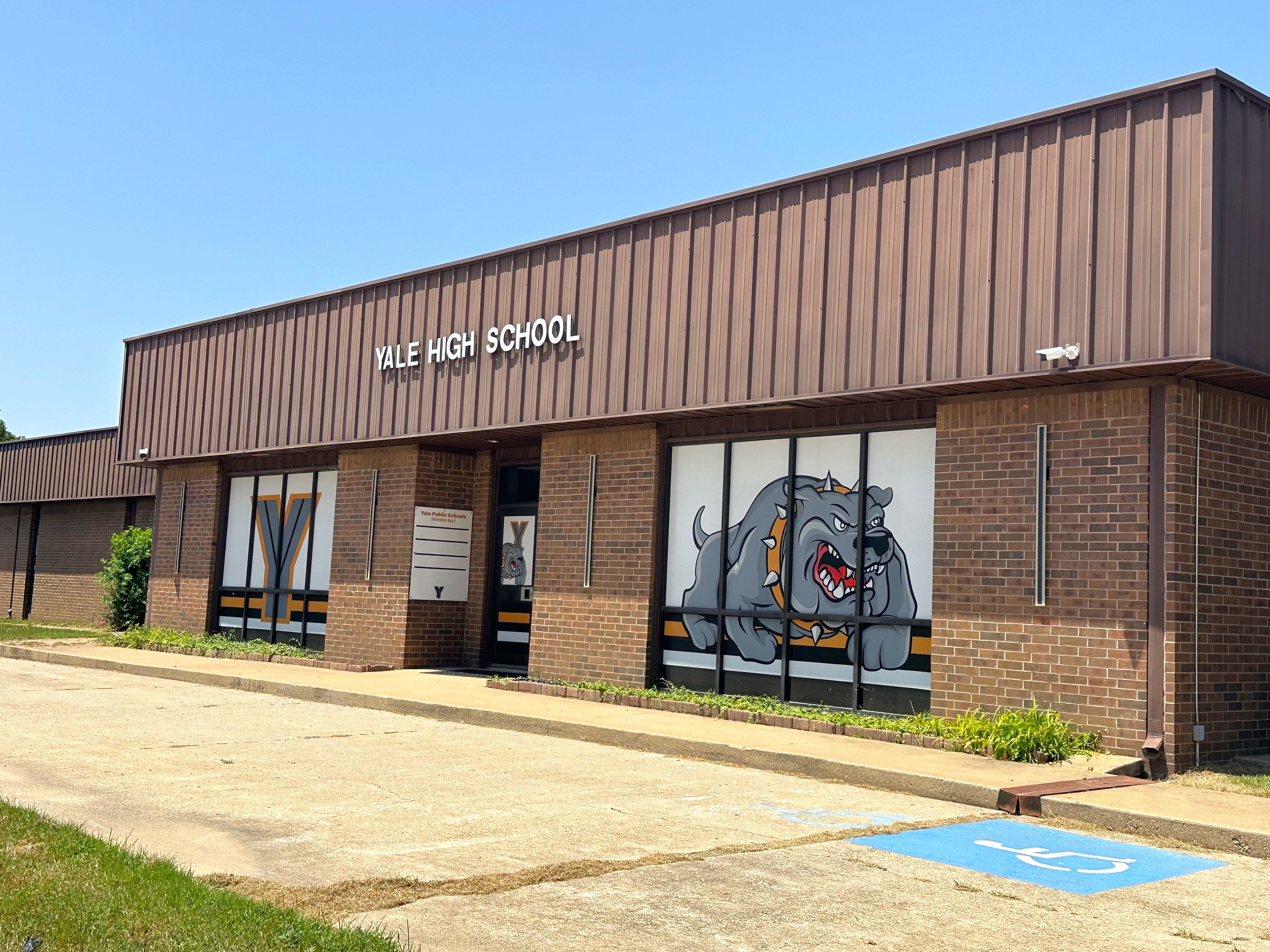
Yale High School in July of 2026

As of the 2010 census, there were 1,227 people living in the city. The population density was 1,473.3 inhabitants per square mile (568.8/km^{2}). There were 604 housing units at an average density of 670 per square mile (260/km^{2}).

There were 529 households, out of which 32.1% had children under the age of 18 living with them, 51.0% were married couples living together, 10.6% had a female householder with no husband present, and 32.1% were non-families. 30.2% of all households were made up of individuals, and 14.6% had someone living alone who was 65 years of age or older. The average household size was 2.47 and the average family size was 3.04.

In the city, the population was spread out, with 26.7% under the age of 18, 10.3% from 18 to 24, 25.6% from 25 to 44, 20.0% from 45 to 64, and 17.5% who were 65 years of age or older. The median age was 36 years. For every 100 females, there were 91.2 males. For every 100 females age 18 and over, there were 88.1 males.

The median income for a household in the city was $23,403, and the median income for a family was $30,714. Males had a median income of $26,630 versus $15,813 for females. The per capita income for the city was $11,346. About 15.7% of families and 19.5% of the population were below the poverty line, including 22.3% of those under age 18 and 13.5% of those age 65 or over.

== Government ==
Yale operates under a council–manager form of government.

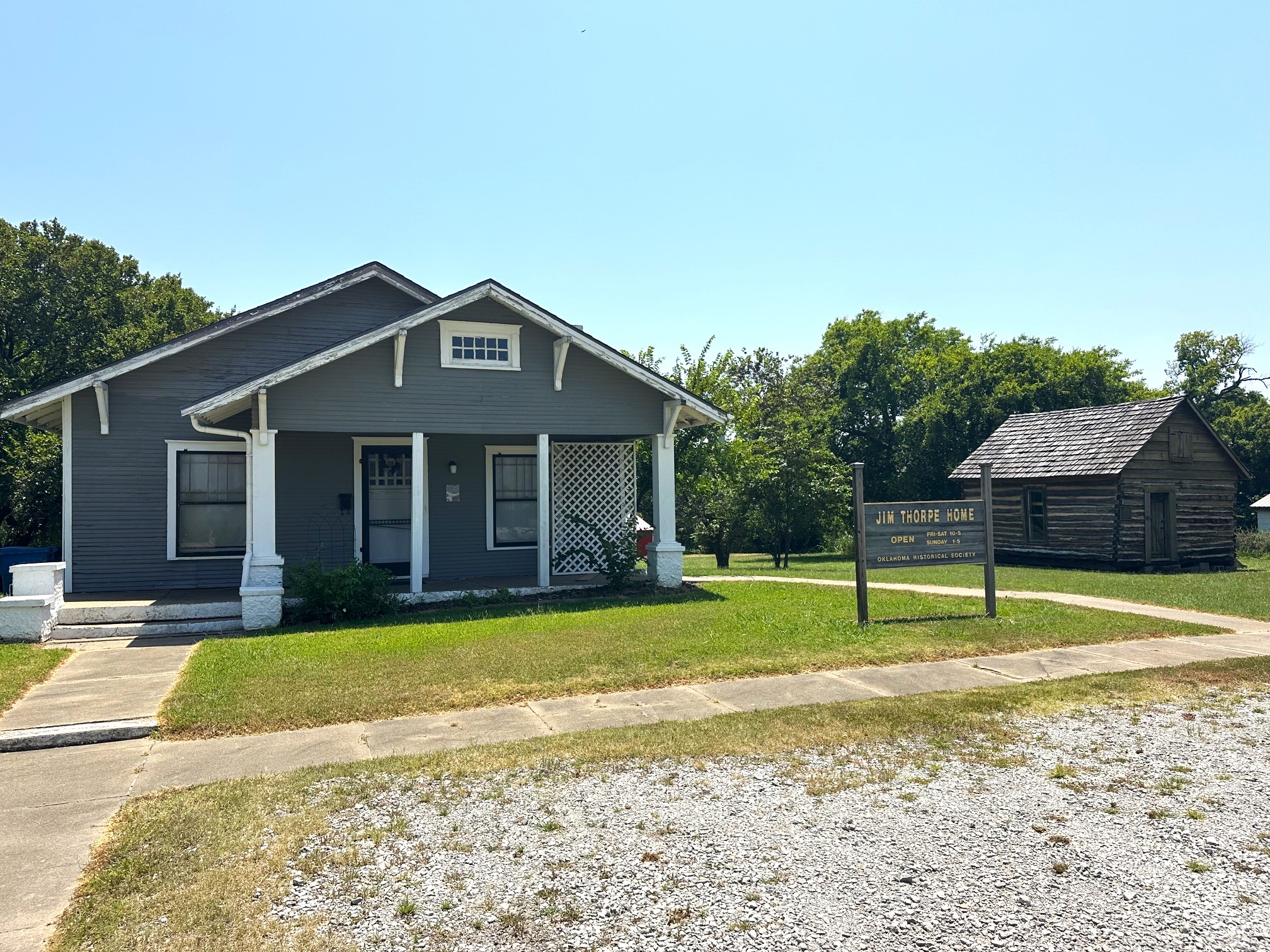
Jim Thorpe Home with cabin in Yale, during July of 2026

== Notable people ==
- Chet Baker, jazz trumpeter and vocalist, born in Yale in 1929.
- Jim Thorpe, Olympic gold medalist, lived in Yale from 1917 to 1923. The Jim Thorpe House, containing a museum owned by the Thorpe family as of mid-2024, is on the National Register of Historic Places listings in Payne County, Oklahoma.
