= Duke Township =

Duke Township may refer to:

- Duke Township, Harnett County, North Carolina
- Duke Township, Jackson County, Oklahoma - see List of Oklahoma townships
