= Glass terminal =

A glass terminal may refer to:

- a terminal building constructed in large part out of glass
- a so-called glass teletype
