= Terminal Building =

Terminal Building may refer to:

in the United States

(by state then city)

- Terminal Building (Coffeyville, Kansas), listed on the NRHP in Montgomery County
- Terminal Building, Old, Hangar and Powerhouse at Key Field, Meridian, Mississippi, listed on the NRHP in Lauderdale County
- Terminal Building (Lincoln, Nebraska), listed on the NRHP in Lancaster County
- Terminal Building (Rochester, New York), listed on the NRHP in Monroe County
- Terminal Building (Oklahoma City, Oklahoma), home of architects Tonini & Bramblet
