= Cottonwood Community Center =

- U.S. National Register of Historic Places
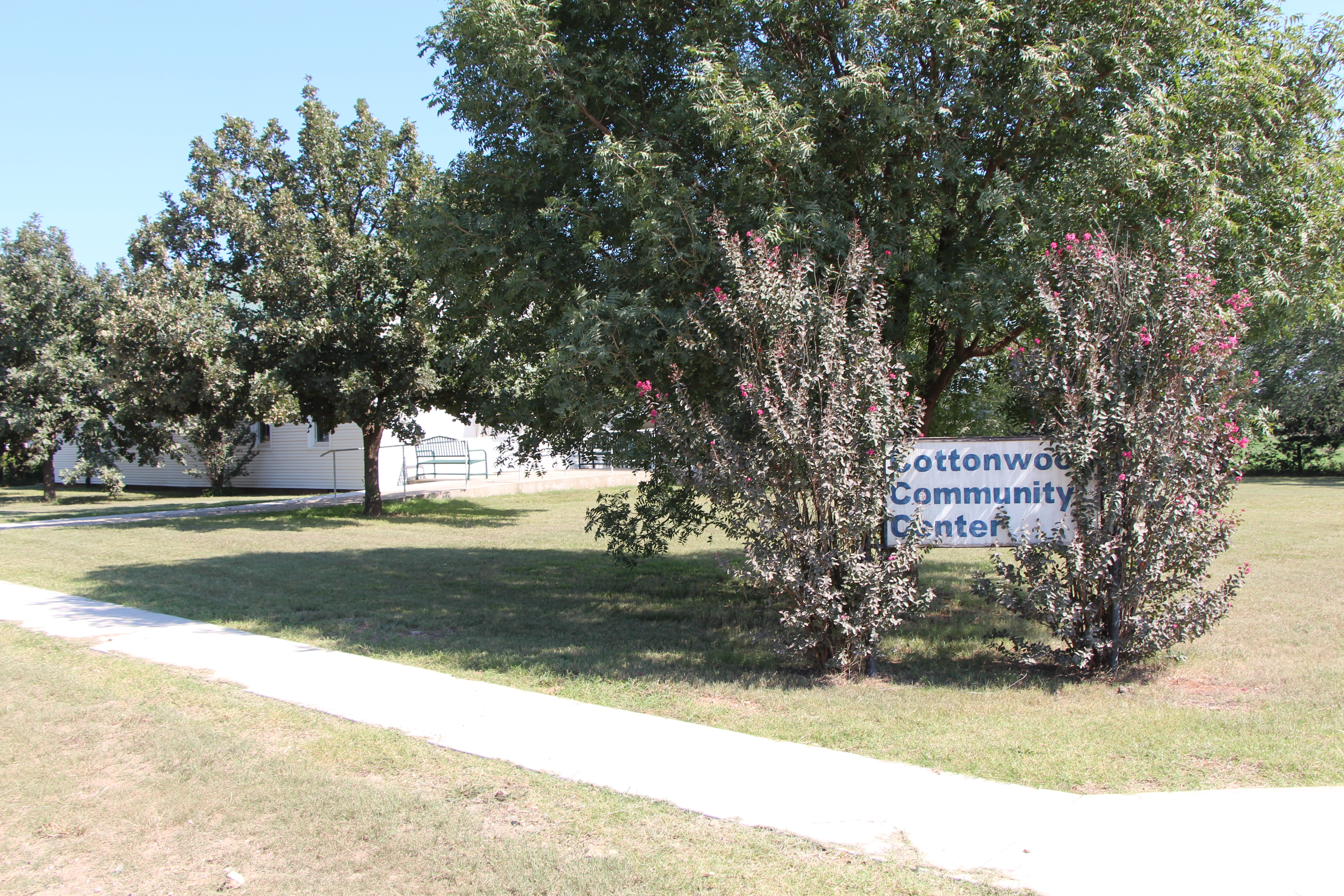

- Location within Oklahoma Location within the United States
- Location: Payne County, Oklahoma
- Nearest city: Stillwater, Oklahoma
- Coordinates: 36°8′43″N 97°4′35″W
- Area: less than one acre
- Built: 1889
- NRHP reference No.: 80004291
- Added to NRHP: March 13, 1980

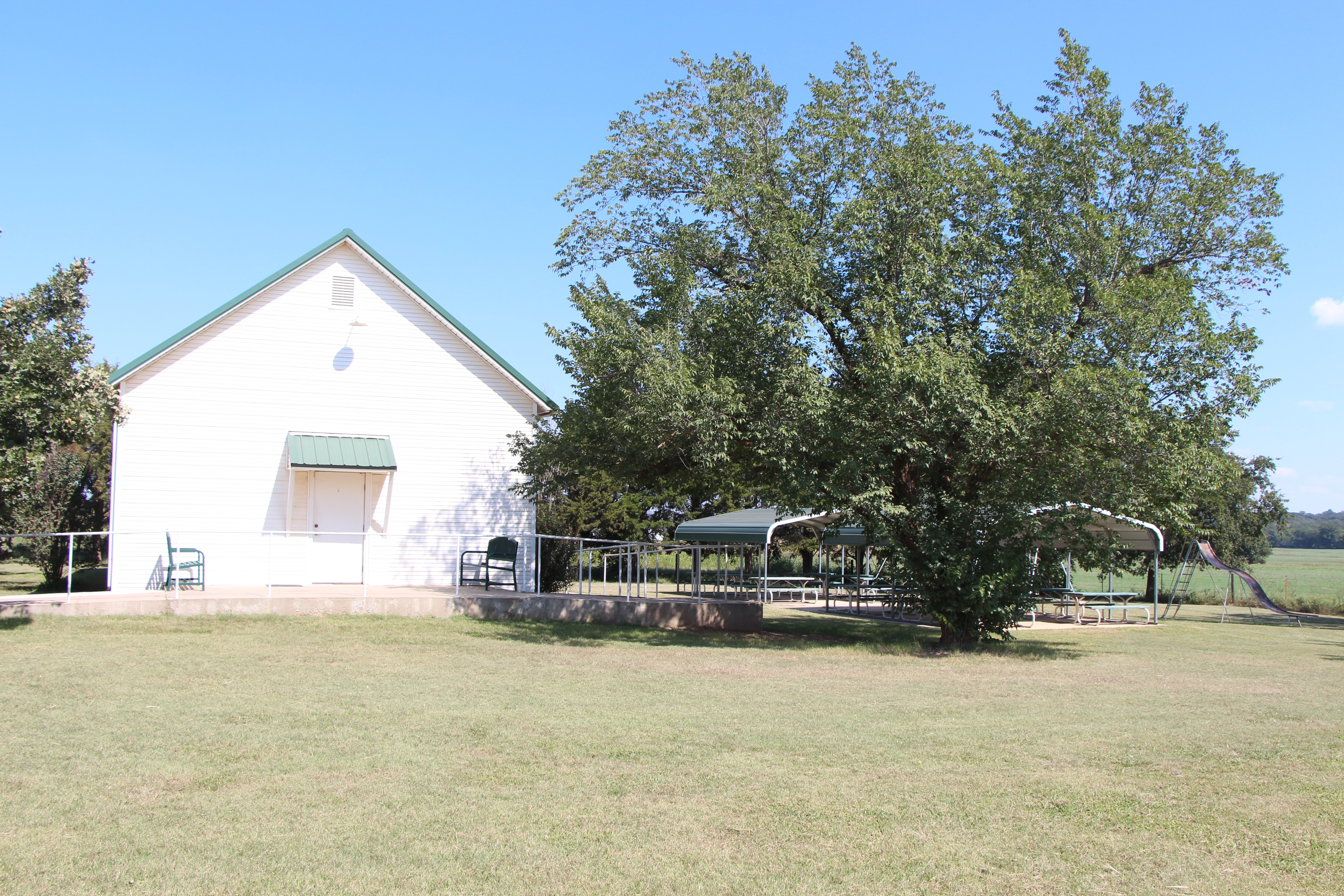
Cottonwood Community Center, south side

Cottonwood Community Center, built about 1889, is significant for its historic associations with the development of Stillwater, Oklahoma's rural agricultural community. The center is indicative of school house architecture that was popular in the late 1800s and early 1900s in the Stillwater community.

Of the four remaining one-room school structures in the Stillwater area, only the Cottonwood has been in continuous use from the time it was built to the present. It has been, and continues to be, an important focus of life for the rural community west of the town. The other one-room school house in Payne County listed as a National Historic Place is the Pleasant Valley School.

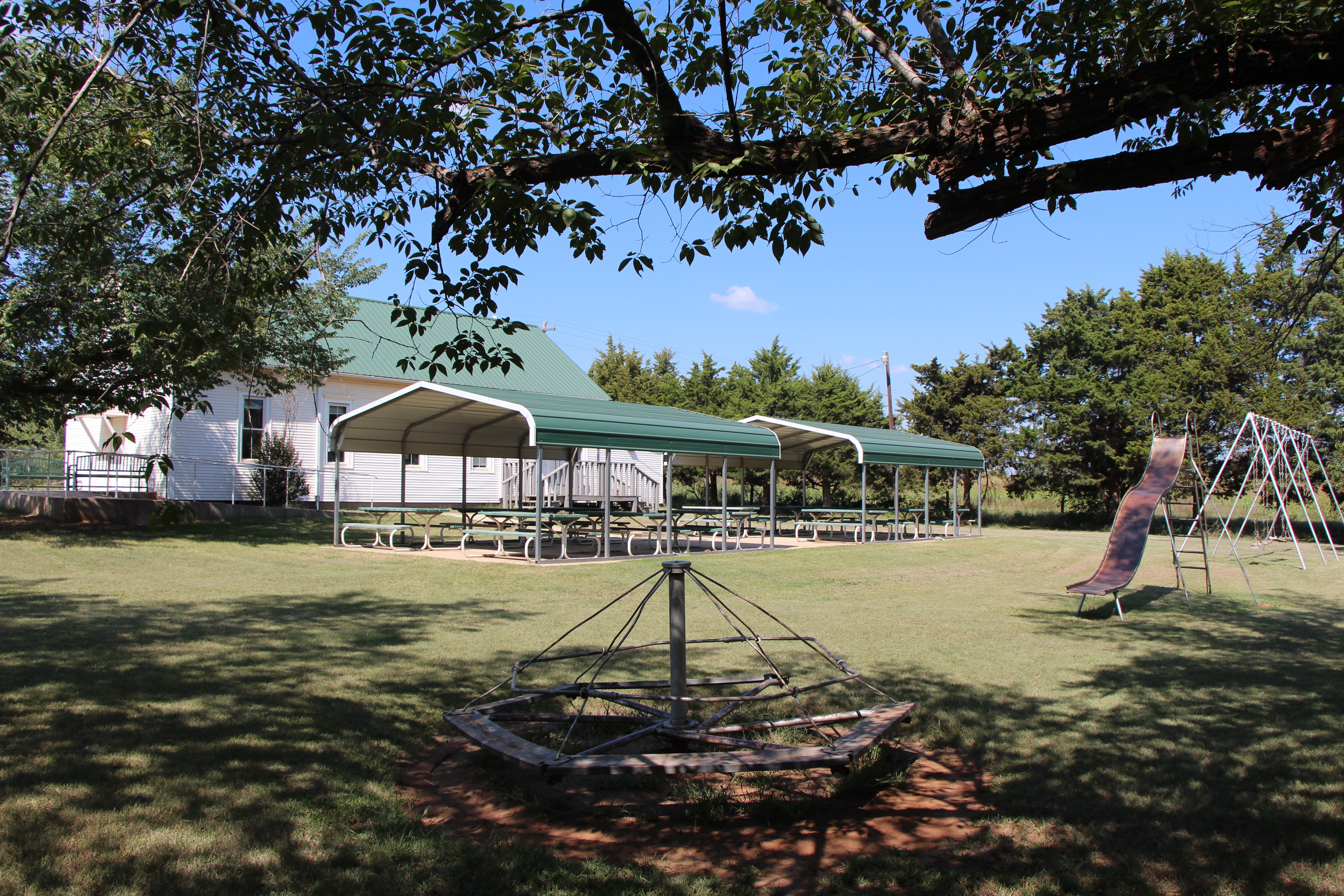
Cottonwood Community Center, east side

It was named Cottonwood because there was an abundance of cottonwood from which the center was constructed, using hand-cut wood.

The building belongs to the School District of Stillwater but the community residents do maintenance and repair. The land belongs to a corporation of community residents.
