= Terminal building =

Terminal building may refer to:

- Terminal Building (disambiguation), specific structures
- a building where one or more modes of transport terminate, including:
  - Airport terminal
  - Passenger terminal (maritime)
  - Railroad terminal
  - Bus terminal
- Container ports, also called terminals
