= White Cloud Lodge =

- U.S. National Register of Historic Places
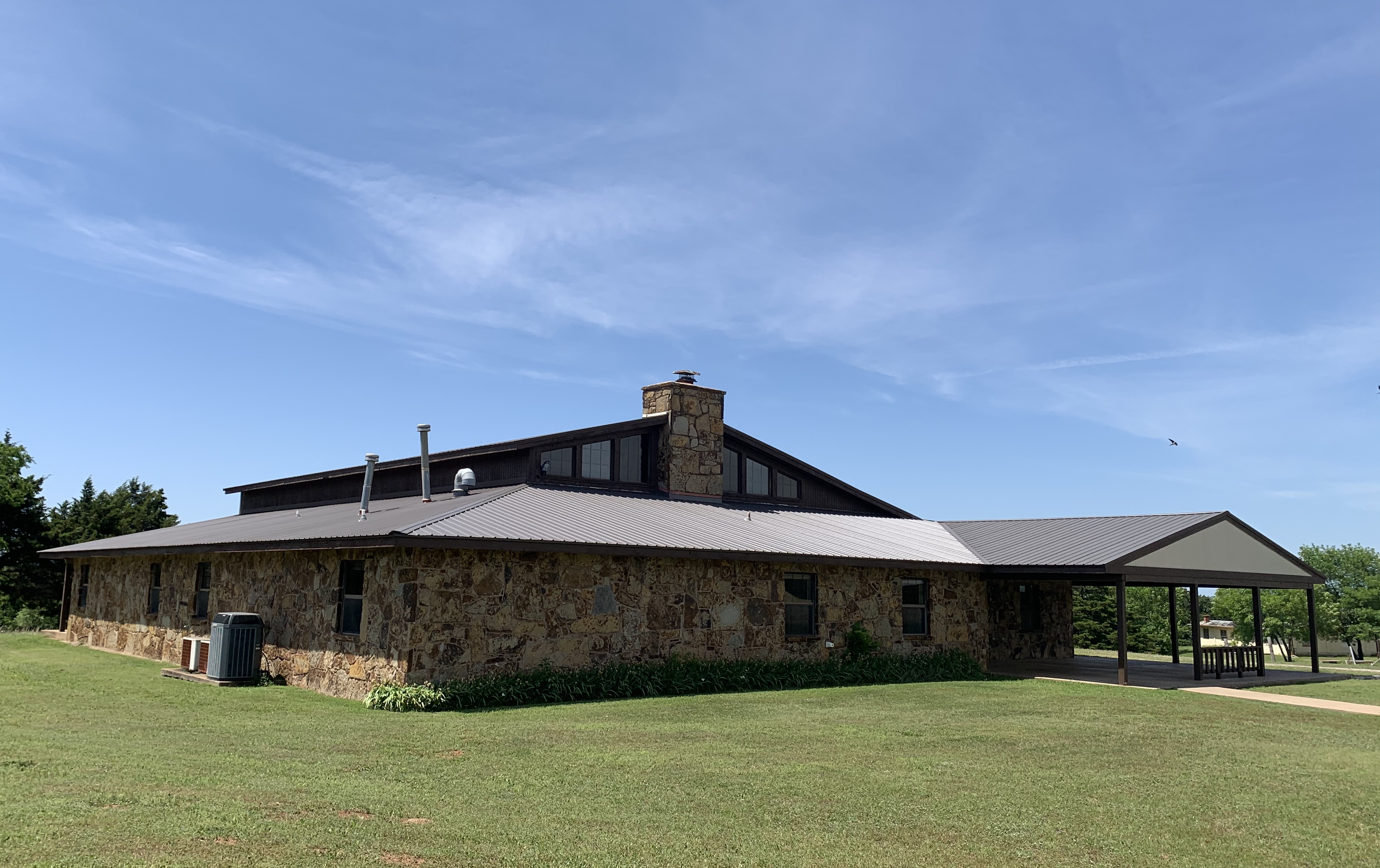

- Location within Oklahoma Location within the United States
- Location: 820 E. 146th St., Payne County, Oklahoma near Perkins, Oklahoma
- Coordinates: 35°56′57″N 97°02′53″W
- Area: 1 acre (0.40 ha)
- Built: 1966
- Built by: John Barta
- Architect: Elmira Sauberan Smyrl
- Architectural style: Contemporary
- NRHP reference No.: 10000619
- Added to NRHP: September 3, 2010

The White Cloud Lodge, in Payne County, Oklahoma near Perkins, Oklahoma, was a Contemporary-style work of architect Elmira Sauberan Smyrl. It was built in 1966 and was listed on the National Register of Historic Places in 2010.

The building is a thin shell concrete structure which she designed to serve as a "school for family living", back in 1955 as her thesis project at Oklahoma State University. The builder was John Barta.

Later the building was closed and used only for storage.
