= Major County Courthouse =

- U.S. National Register of Historic Places
- Location within Oklahoma Location within the United States
- Location: Courthouse Sq., Fairview, Oklahoma
- Coordinates: 36°16′8″N 98°28′26″W
- Area: 1 acre (0.40 ha)
- Built: 1928
- Architect: Tonini & Bramblet
- MPS: County Courthouses of Oklahoma TR
- NRHP reference No.: 84003153
- Added to NRHP: August 23, 1984

Major County Courthouse is a historic courthouse in Fairview, Oklahoma. It was built in 1928 and designed by Tonini and Bramblet, who also designed several other courthouses in Oklahoma. The four-story stone building features Tuscan columns and pilasters spanning the second and third floors. The columns are topped by a frieze reading "MAJOR COUNTY COURT HOUSE", and the building is topped by a projecting cornice and a parapet. The building's front entrance is in a Roman arch; the double doors have glass panels and a fanlight.

The courthouse was added to the National Register of Historic Places on August 23, 1984.
