= Mehan, Oklahoma =

- Census-designated place
- Location within Oklahoma Location within the United States
- Coordinates: 36°2′41″N 96°56′33″W
- Country: United States
- State: Oklahoma
- County: Payne

Area
  - Total: 0.14 sq mi (0.36 km^{2})
  - Land: 0.14 sq mi (0.36 km^{2})
  - Water: 0 sq mi (0.00 km^{2})
- Elevation: 830 ft (250 m)

Population (2020)
  - Total: 34
  - Density: 243.5/sq mi (94.03/km^{2})
- Time zone: UTC-6 (Central (CST))
  - Summer (DST): UTC-5 (CDT)
- ZIP Code: 74074 (Stillwater)
- Area codes: 405/572
- FIPS code: 40-47550
- GNIS feature ID: 2812866

Mehan is an unincorporated community and census-designated place (CDP) in Payne County, Oklahoma, United States. It was first listed as a CDP prior to the 2020 census. As of the 2020 census, Mehan had a population of 34.

The CDP is in central Payne County, on the northeast side of the valley of Stillwater Creek, a southeast-flowing tributary of the Cimarron River. Mehan is 11 miles (18 km) southeast of Stillwater, the Payne county seat, and 10 miles (16 km) northeast of Perkins.

== Demographics ==
Historical population
Census	Pop.	Note	%±
2020	34		—
U.S. Decennial Census

=== 2020 census ===
As of the 2020 census, Mehan had a population of 34. The median age was 47.0 years. 23.5% of residents were under the age of 18 and 17.6% of residents were 65 years of age or older. For every 100 females there were 112.5 males, and for every 100 females age 18 and over there were 136.4 males age 18 and over.

0.0% of residents lived in urban areas, while 100.0% lived in rural areas.

There were 11 households in Mehan, of which 0.0% had children under the age of 18 living in them. Of all households, 72.7% were married-couple households, 18.2% were households with a male householder and no spouse or partner present, and 9.1% were households with a female householder and no spouse or partner present. About 18.2% of all households were made up of individuals and 18.2% had someone living alone who was 65 years of age or older.

There were 15 housing units, of which 26.7% were vacant. The homeowner vacancy rate was 0.0% and the rental vacancy rate was 0.0%.

Racial composition as of the 2020 census
Race	Number	Percent
White	23	67.6%
Black or African American	1	2.9%
American Indian and Alaska Native	3	8.8%
Asian	1	2.9%
Native Hawaiian and Other Pacific Islander	0	0.0%
Some other race	0	0.0%
Two or more races	6	17.6%
Hispanic or Latino (of any race)	1	2.9%
