= Crawford County Courthouse (Kansas) =

- U.S. National Register of Historic Places
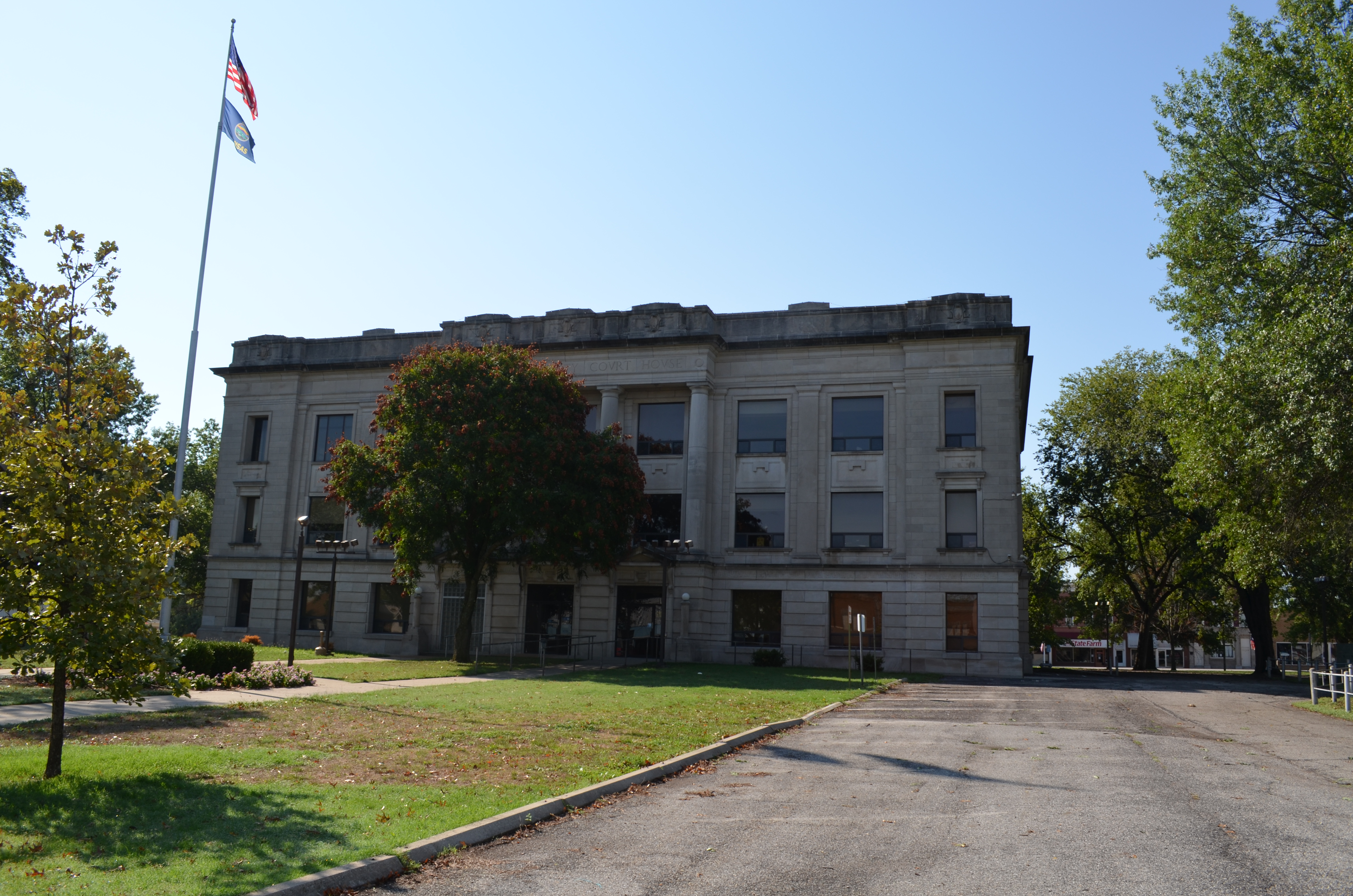
- The Crawford County Courthouse in 2012

- Location within Kansas Location within the United States
- Location: 111 E. Forest, Courthouse Square, Girard, Kansas
- Area: Less than one acre
- Built: 1922
- Architect: Tonini and Bramblet
- Architectural style: Classical Revival
- MPS: County Courthouses of Kansas MPS
- NRHP reference No.: 09000225
- Added to NRHP: April 22, 2009

The Crawford County Courthouse in Girard, Kansas, is a Classical Revival-style courthouse built in 1922. It was listed on the National Register of Historic Places in 2009.

The building is a three-story reinforced concrete building faced with stone, designed with Classical Revival symmetry, Tuscan columns, pilasters and pedimented entries. It is about 123 by 97 feet (37 m × 30 m) in plan. It was designed by architects Tonini and Bramblet.

The listing included the entire courthouse square, about 400 by 400 feet (120 m × 120 m) in size, and a gazebo as a second contributing structure. It also included three non-contributing objects: a Huey helicopter, a Vietnam War veteran's memorial, and a deer statue.
