= Josephine Reifsnyder Lustron House =

Historic house in Oklahoma, United States

- U.S. National Register of Historic Places
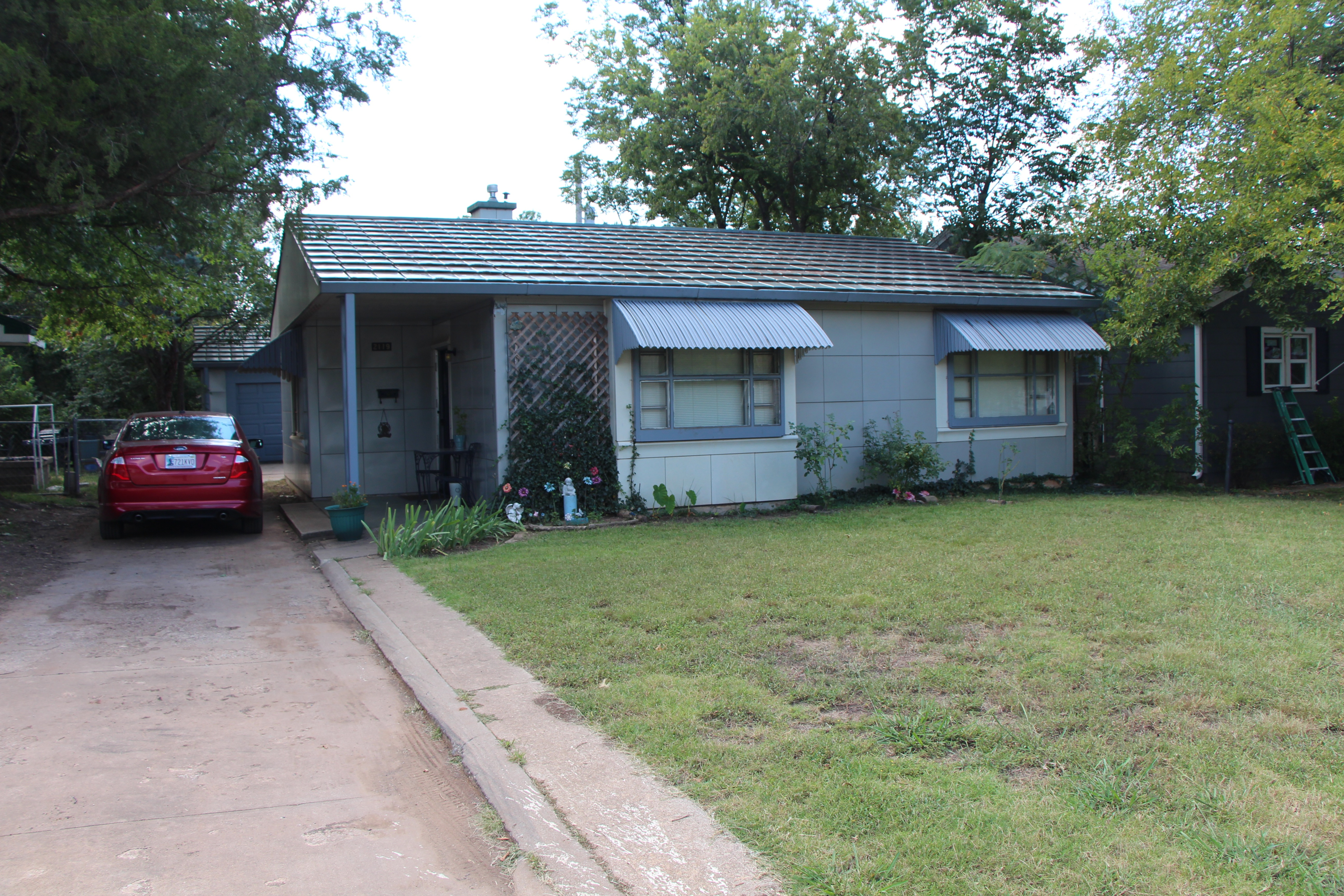

- Location within Oklahoma Location within the United States
- Location: 2119 Sherwood, Stillwater, Payne County, Oklahoma
- Nearest city: Stillwater, Oklahoma
- Coordinates: 36°7′19″N 97°5′4″W
- Built: 1949
- Built by: Hall and Abercrombie
- Architect: Blass and Beckman
- Architectural style: Lustron
- MPS: Lustron Houses of Oklahoma
- NRHP reference No.: 09000078
- Added to NRHP: February 23, 2009

The Josephine Reifsnyder Lustron House in Stillwater, Oklahoma is a historic prefabricated home. One of several Lustron houses built in Oklahoma during the post World War II housing shortage, this house is a well-preserved two-bedroom Lustron Westchester model with a detached Lustron garage.

== Background and history ==
At the end of World War II in 1945, the U.S. Government estimated that the country needed to create nearly 3 million moderate to low income houses for returning soldiers and their families as soon as possible, followed by an additional 10 million units in the next decade. It found that home builders could not supply such a demand using conventional techniques. Carl Strandlund, owner of Lustron Company, proposed a solution: use prefabricated units that could be assembled quickly and cheaply all over the United States, using local dealerships to assemble the final products.

== Description ==
The Reifsnyder house was built in 1949 by the Lustron dealership of Hall and Abercrombie of Cushing and Stillwater. Designated as the "Westchester Model," it has a living, dining and kitchen area, a bathroom and two bedrooms dimensions, providing 1,021 square feet (94.9 m^{2}) of living area in one story. on a 31 feet (9.4 m) by 35 feet (11 m) floor plan. It is constructed of steel components including interior and exterior enameled steel panels for the walls. The roof consists of porcelain enamel coated steel panels resembling roof shingles. The interior features steel cabinets and pocket doors. Hot water pipes laid in the concrete floors provided radiant heating.

This house was purchased by Josephine Reifsnyder in November 1949. The house changed hands several times between 1962 and 1983, and has been a rental property in the Oklahoma State University campus area for many years.

It was added to the National Register of Historic Places on February 23, 2009.

The dealership built two Lustrons in Cushing after constructing this first Lustron in Stillwater.

== See also ==
- Carl Strandlund
- Lustron house
- National Register of Historic Places listings in Payne County, Oklahoma
