= Tonini & Bramblet =

American architectural firm

Tonini & Bramblet was an Oklahoma City-based architectural firm which designed a number of courthouses in Oklahoma.

It was a partnership of Otto Hofman Tonini (1873-1971), who was born in Kentucky of German and Swiss immigrant parents, and of Robert (Lorn) Bramblet. Partners in 1931 no longer included Bramblet but did include T. Wyman Thompson. The firm's office was in the Terminal Building in Oklahoma City.

The firm was later named Hair, Tonini & Bramblet.

A number of the firm's works are listed on the U.S. National Register of Historic Places.

Works include (with attribution):

Oklahoma

- Alfalfa County Courthouse (1921), Grand Ave. Cherokee, Oklahoma (Tonini & Bramblet), NRHP-listed
- Cotton County Courthouse, 301 N. Broadway Walters, Oklahoma (Tonini & Bramblet), NRHP-listed
- Major County Courthouse, Courthouse Sq. Fairview, Oklahoma (Tonini & Bramblet), NRHP-listed
- Okmulgee County Courthouse, 300 W. 7th St. Okmulgee, Oklahoma (Hair, Tonini & Bramblet), NRHP-listed
- Payne County Courthouse, 606 S. Husband St. Stillwater, Oklahoma (Hair, Tonini & Bramblet), NRHP-listed
- Tillman County Courthouse, Gladstone and Main Sts. Frederick, Oklahoma (Tonini & Bramblet), NRHP-listed

Kansas

- Crawford County Courthouse, 111 E. Forest, Courthouse Square Girard, KS (Tonini and Bramlet), NRHP-listed, only Kansas building known to be designed by the firm.

The firm sued Mayes County, Oklahoma for breach of contract regarding a courthouse design for Mayes County, which was not built. The Supreme Court of Oklahoma ruled on the case in 1931.
