= Payne County Courthouse =

- U.S. National Register of Historic Places
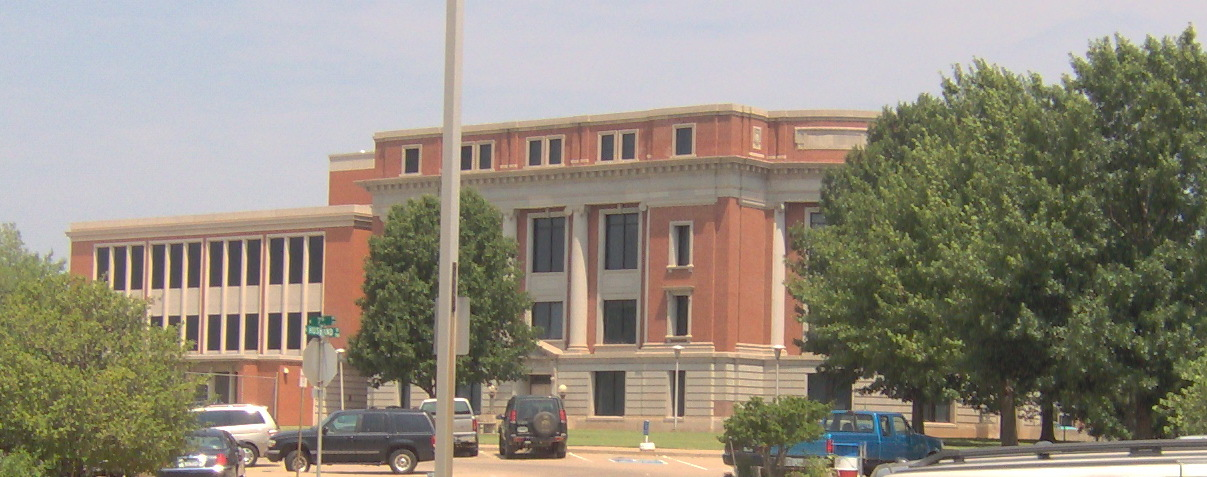
- Payne County Courthouse in July 2006

- Location within Oklahoma Location within the United States
- Interactive map showing the location of Payne County Courthouse
- Location: 606 S. Husband St., Stillwater, Oklahoma
- Coordinates: 36°6′55″N 97°3′37″W
- Area: 1 acre (0.40 ha)
- Built: 1917
- Architect: Hair, Tonini & Bramblet
- Architectural style: Late 19th And 20th Century Revivals
- MPS: County Courthouses of Oklahoma TR
- NRHP reference No.: 84003410
- Added to NRHP: August 23, 1984

The Payne County Courthouse is a historic courthouse located in Stillwater, Oklahoma, United States. Built in 1917, it is constructed of red brick and stone. It was listed on the National Register of Historic Places in 1984. Its design is similar to the Tillman County Courthouse and the Okmulgee County Courthouse, both of which are also listed in the National Register.
