= Jim Thorpe House =

Historic house in Oklahoma, United States

- U.S. National Register of Historic Places
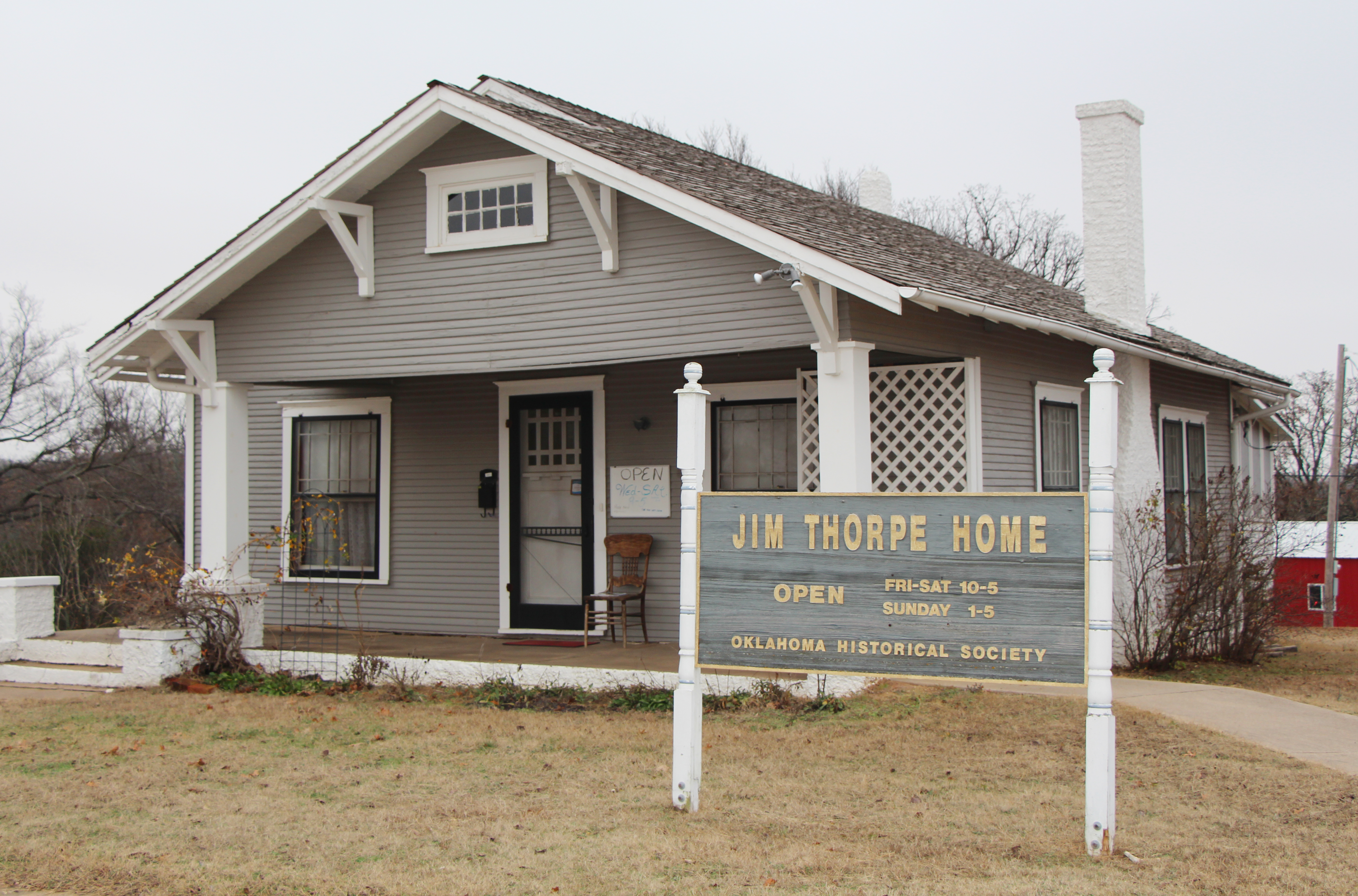
- Jim Thorpe House

- Location within Oklahoma Location within the United States
- Location: 706 East Boston Avenue, Yale, Oklahoma
- Coordinates: 36.11497°N 96.69056°W
- Built: 1916
- Architectural style: Bungalow/craftsman
- NRHP reference No.: 71000673
- Added to NRHP: March 24, 1971

The Jim Thorpe House is a historic house in Yale, Oklahoma.

In 1917, Jim Thorpe bought a small home in Yale, Oklahoma and lived there until 1923 with his wife, Iva Miller, and children, one of whom, Jim Jr., died at the age of two. The house was bought by the Oklahoma Historical Society in 1968 and is now listed in the National Register of Historic Places in Payne County, Oklahoma. The house is maintained by the Jim Thorpe Memorial Foundation as a small museum to Thorpe and contains related memorabilia. In mid-2024, the Oklahoma Historical Society sold the home to the Thorpe family, and it continues as a museum.
