= William Frick House =

Historic house in Oklahoma, United States

- U.S. National Register of Historic Places
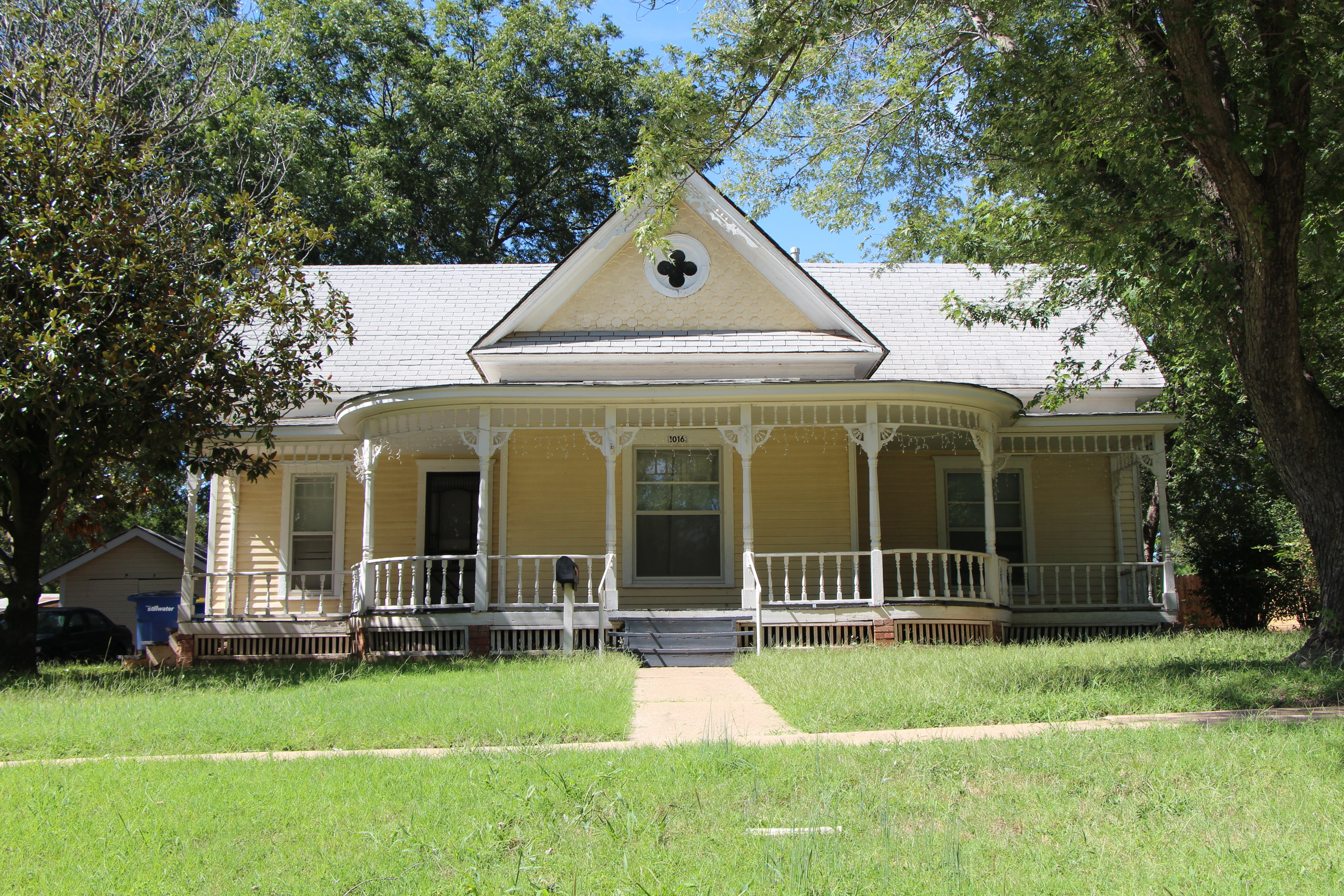

- Location within Oklahoma Location within the United States
- Location: 1016 S. West St., Stillwater, Payne County, Oklahoma
- Coordinates: 36°6′36″N 97°3′47″W
- Area: less than one acre
- Built: 1903
- Architect: William Frick
- Architectural style: Carpenter Gothic
- NRHP reference No.: 80004292
- Added to NRHP: September 18, 1980

The William Frick House (also known as the Una Faye Sexton House) is a historic house located at 1016 South West Street in Stillwater, Payne County, Oklahoma.

== Description and history ==
Built in 1903 by William Frick, owner of Stillwater's first feed store, the Frick House is one of the best remaining examples of turn of the century Victorian style cottages. It is a single-story cottage. Carpenter gothic trim and octagon cut fish-scale shingles decorate the gables. A curving porch extends the width of the front of the house. The porch is enhanced with turned posts, with supporting brackets, turned railing posts and spindle bands under the eaves. Asbestos shingles have been added to the roof, which is decorated with a dormer with small ventilating window. The woodwork of the window is cut in a quatrefoil pattern and the peak of the dormer is decorated with additional scrollwork.

The original section of the house, consisting of four rooms, has undergone very minimal alteration. Original wood paneling has been retained. The ceilings-have been lowered. The floor plan is original. In 1958, a four-room addition was added to the rear, consisting of two bedrooms, a living area, and a bath.

It was added to the National Register of Historic Places on September 18, 1980.
