= Tillman County Courthouse =

- U.S. National Register of Historic Places
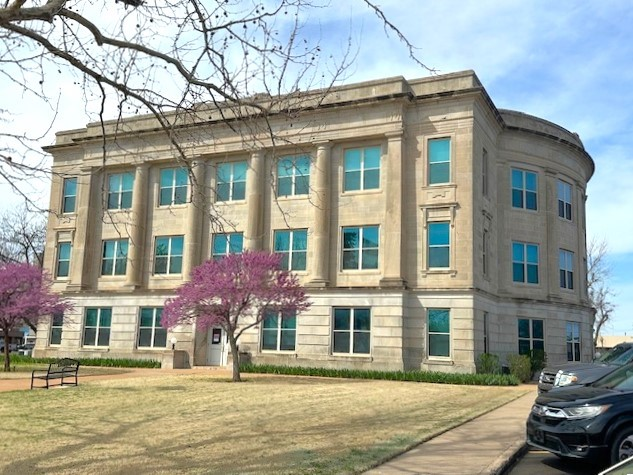
- The Courthouse in March of 2025

- Location within Oklahoma Location within the United States
- Interactive map showing the location of Tillman County Courthouse
- Location: Gladstone and Main Sts., Frederick, Oklahoma
- Coordinates: 34°23′29″N 99°01′01″W
- Area: 1 acre (0.40 ha)
- Built: 1921
- Built by: Downing, Charles
- Architect: Tonini & Bramblet
- Architectural style: Late 19th and 20th Century Revivals
- MPS: County Courthouses of Oklahoma TR
- NRHP reference No.: 84003455
- Added to NRHP: August 24, 1984

The Tillman County Courthouse, at 201 N. Main St. in Frederick, Oklahoma, was built in 1921. It was listed on the National Register of Historic Places in 1984.

It was a work of architects Tonini & Bramblet. It is a three-story concrete slab building with concrete slabs presented to resemble cut stone. Its back/north side has a curved wall projecting about 15 feet (4.6 m).
