= Oklahoma A&M College Agronomy Barn and Seed House =

- Oklahoma A & M College Agronomy Barn and Seed House
- U.S. National Register of Historic Places
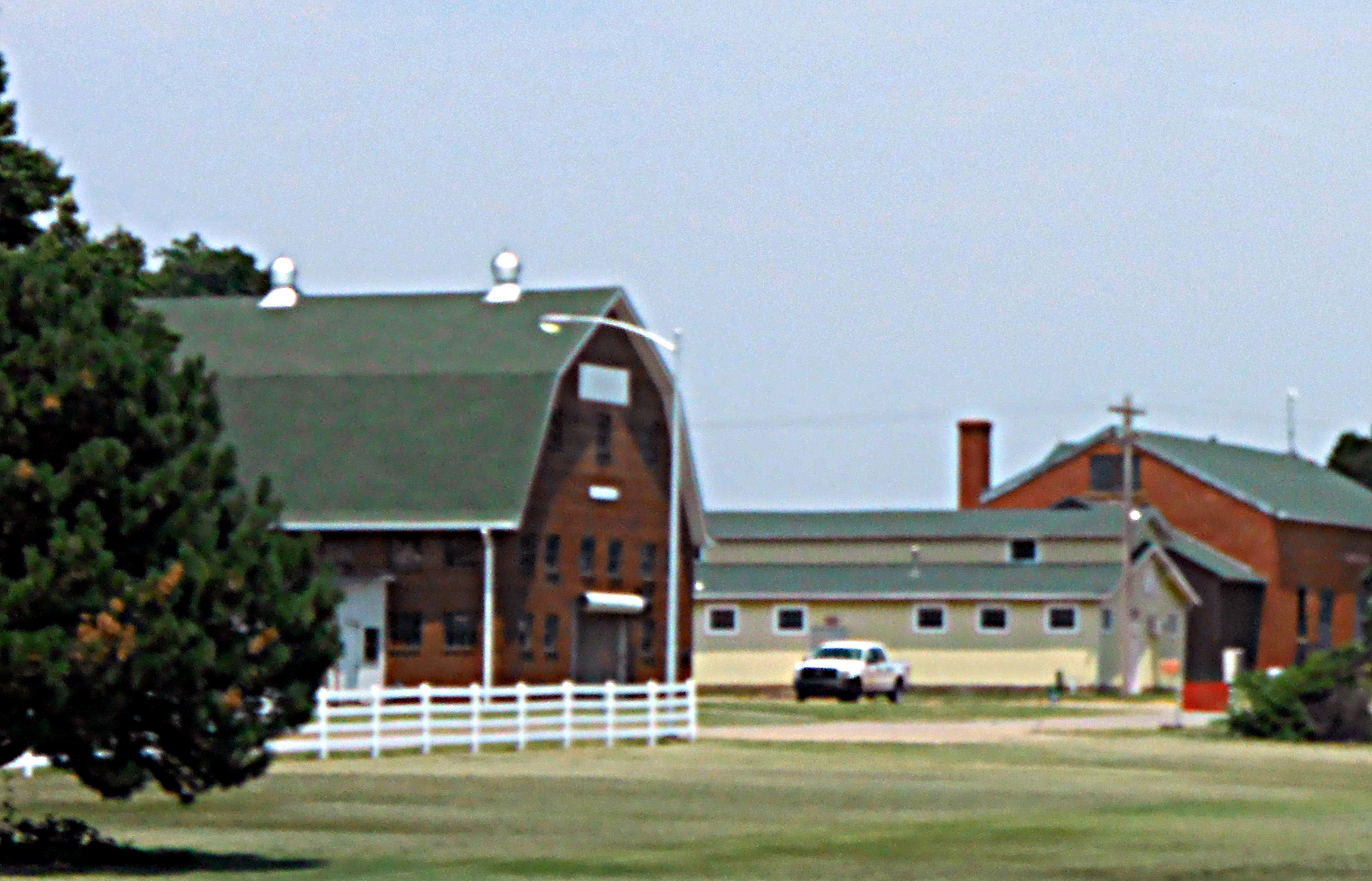

- Location within Oklahoma Location within the United States
- Location: 2902 W. 6th St. Building #610, Stillwater, Oklahoma
- Coordinates: 36°7′2″N 97°5′37″W
- Area: less than one acre
- Built: 1934
- Architect: Phillip T. Wilbur
- Architectural style: Transverse-Frame Barn
- NRHP reference No.: 04000519
- Added to NRHP: May 27, 2004

The Agronomy Barn Seed House, located on the Agronomy Research Station of Oklahoma State University, was built in 1934. It is a brick, concrete, frame barn, measuring 108 feet long, 44 feet wide, and 37 feet 9 inches high, and is distinguished by a large gambrel roof. The ground floor as well as the loft is concrete. In design it is very typical of barns of the period. The barn was designed and constructed by Oklahoma State University students, architects, professors, and engineers.
