= Campus Fire Station =

- U.S. National Register of Historic Places
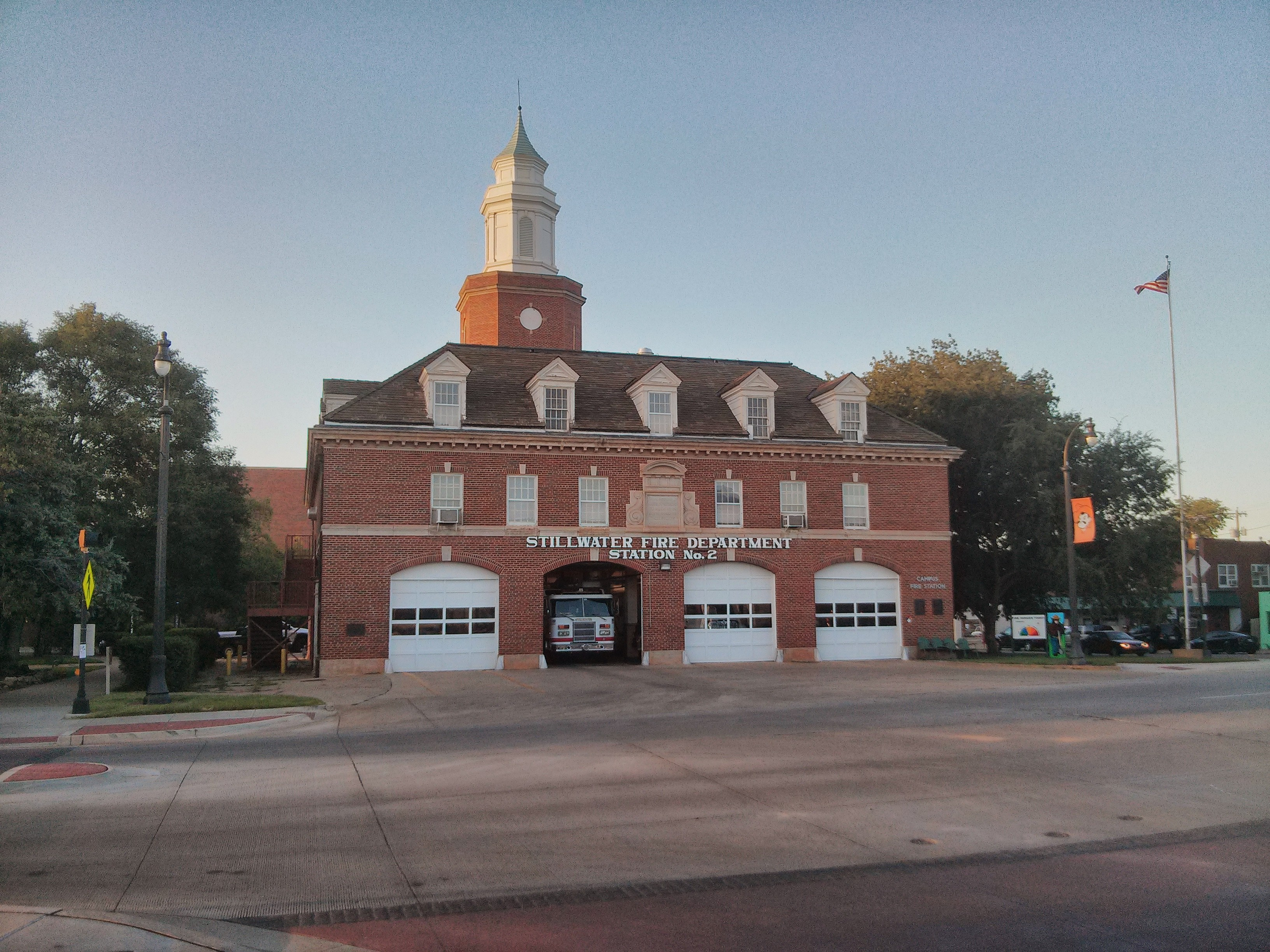
- Fire station

- Location within Oklahoma Location within the United States
- Location: 600 W. University Ave., Stillwater, Oklahoma
- Coordinates: 36°7′12″N 97°3′54″W
- Area: 1 acre (0.40 ha)
- Built: 1938
- Architect: Wilbur, Philip A.
- Architectural style: Colonial Revival
- NRHP reference No.: 04001336
- Added to NRHP: December 7, 2004

The Campus Fire Station is a working fire station and classroom facility located on the Oklahoma State University campus in Stillwater, Oklahoma. It was built as a shared facility to provide fire coverage for the city and campus, and to provide space for the first academic degree program for firefighters in the United States.

== History ==
Growing out of initiatives by fire insurance companies to improve fire protection and cut insurance losses, Oklahoma was active in the firefighter professionalization movement as early as the 1894 formation of the Oklahoma Territorial Fireman's Association. Lectures on firefighting techniques at the association's annual conventions grew into a Fire School hosted at the Oklahoma Agricultural and Mechanical College (OAMC), now the Oklahoma State University–Stillwater campus. OAMC created the Department of Firemanship Training in 1937, the first degree program for firefighters in the nation. A desire to expand training facilities, as well as the city's growth, led to the construction of a joint city fire station and fire training laboratory. The OAMC firemanship department's class of 1940, the first in the new facility, received certificates in a two-year program. Graduates have received a bachelor's degree since 1970.

== Building ==
Construction of the Campus Fire Station was started in 1938 and finished in 1939, funded jointly by the college, the city, and the federal Public Works Administration. It was designed by OAMC architect Philip A. Wilbur, and is located on the campus at Knoblock Street and College (now University) Avenue.

The fire station has a core brick rectangular building, 77 x 82 feet and three stories high, two wings, and a five-story drill tower topped by a steeple. It is in Georgian or Colonial Revival architecture style like many other buildings on the campus. The building was designed as an active fire station, and as such contains four bays and large garage doors on the lower floor with classrooms on the upper floors. The outside of the building retains much of its historic character. The interior has been updated over the years to accommodate new technologies and training requirements.

The building was added to the National Register of Historic Places in 2004 for its significance as the site of pioneering educational initiatives that contributed to the professionalization of the American fire departments, earning it the name "the West Point of the Fire Service."
