= List of Oklahoma townships =

The state of Oklahoma historically had civil townships. On August 5, 1913, voters passed the Oklahoma Township Amendment, also known as State Question 58. This allowed the creation or abolishment of townships on a county by county basis; by the mid-1930s, all Oklahoma counties had voted to abolish them. These civil township boundaries (and their names) were still used by the United States Census for counting purposes up to and including the 1960 census.

This list is exhaustive and does include some townships that were renamed or removed.

Township	County	Notes
Abilene	Caddo	
Adair	Mayes	
Adams	Harper	
Adams Creek	Wagoner	
Advance	Texas	
Afton	Ottawa	
Agency	Muskogee	
Akers	Carter	
Akins	Sequoyah	
Albany	Bryan	
Alderson	Pittsburg	
Alex	Grady	
Alfalfa	Grant	
Alfalfa	Tillman	
Aline	Alfalfa	
Allen	Murray	
Allen	Pontotoc	
Allison	Garfield	
Alluwe	Nowata	
Altona	Kingfisher	
Alva	Woods	
Amber	Grady	
Antelope	Logan	
Antlers	Pushmataha	
Arapaho	Custer	
Arapahoe	Blaine	
Armstrong	Nowata	
Ash Flat	Coal	
Athens	Ellis	
Auburn	Noble	
Austin	Ellis	
Autry	Noble	
Avard	Woods	
Avoca	Pottawatomie	
Bald Hill	Okmulgee	
Bales	Pottawatomie	
Balko	Beaver	
Ballard	Adair	
Banner	Caddo	
Banner	Dewey	
Banner	Garfield	
Banner	Grant	
Banner	Kingfisher	
Banner	Pawnee	
Bar X	Roger Mills	
Barker	Craig	reorganized and renamed
Barnard	Hughes	
Barnitz Towhship	Custer	
Barr	Grant	
Barron	Adair	
Baucum	Jackson	
Bear Creek	Logan	
Beard	Alfalfa	
Bearden	Okfuskee	
Beaty	Delaware	
Beaver	Beaver	
Beaver	Caddo	
Beaver	Cotton	
Beaver	Haskell	
Beaver	Kay	
Beaver	Osage	
Beck	McIntosh	
Beggs	Okmulgee	
Belle	Woods	
Bend	Grant	
Bennington	Bryan	
Bentley	Atoka	
Benton	Ellis	
Berlin	Roger Mills	
Bernice	Delaware	
Berry	Grant	
Berwyn	Carter	
Bessie	Washita	
Bettina	Beckham	
Big Hill	Osage	
Bigheart	Osage	
Bilby	Hughes	
Bishop	Major	
Bixby	Tulsa	
Black Bear	Noble	
Black Dog	Osage	
Black Gum	Sequoyah	
Blackburn	Jefferson	
Blackburn	Pawnee	
Blackwell	Kay	
Blaine	Garfield	
Bloomington	Greer	
Blue Grass	Beaver	
Blue Mound	Wagoner	
Bluejacket	Craig	reorganized and renamed
Bluff	Grant	
Bokchito	Bryan	
Bokoshe	Le Flore	
Boles	Tulsa	
Boone	Caddo	
Boone	Oklahoma	
Bourland	Jefferson	
Bowman	Roger Mills	
Boyd	Dewey	
Braden	Le Flore	
Bradley	Grady	
Brady	Garvin	
Brent	Sequoyah	
Bressie	Noble	
Brewer	Muskogee	
Briggs	Cherokee	
Brinton	Pottawatomie	
Bristow	Creek	
Britton	Oklahoma	
Brogden	Johnston	
Broken	Haskell	
Brown	Bryan	
Brown	Comanche	
Brown	Jefferson	
Brown	Muskogee	
Brown	Seminole	
Brown	Stephens	
Bryan	Coal	
Bryan	Cotton	
Bryan	Grant	
Bryan	Lincoln	
Bryan	Mayes	
Bryan	Okmulgee	
Bucklucksby	Pittsburg	
Buffalo	Beckham	
Buffalo	Garfield	
Buffalo	Harper	
Buffalo	Latimer	
Buffalo	Noble	
Bunch	Adair	
Bunch Creek	Noble	
Burnett	Pottawatomie	
Burney	Love	
Burnham	Pawnee	
Burton	McIntosh	
Byars	McClain	
Byron	Alfalfa	
Cache	Caddo	
Cache	Cotton	
Caddo	Bryan	
Caddo	Caddo	
Calera	Bryan	
Calumet	Canadian	
Calvin	Hughes	
Cameron	Le Flore	
Camp Keltner	Texas	
Campbell	Sequoyah	
Canadian	Blaine	
Canadian	Cleveland	
Canadian	Pittsburg	
Caney	Atoka	
Caney	Osage	
Canton	Blaine	
Cantonment	Blaine	
Carlisle	Kay	
Carlton	Blaine	
Carmel	Jackson	
Carnegie	Caddo	
Carr	Craig	reorganized and renamed
Carr	Tillman	
Carson	Noble	
Carthage	Texas	
Case	Cleveland	
Cass	Oklahoma	
Castle	Okfuskee	
Catoosa	Rogers	
Cedar	Custer	
Cedar	Logan	
Cedar	Woods	
Cedar Grove	Comanche	
Cedar Valley	Blaine	
Cedardale	Woodward	
Cement	Canadian	
Centralia	Craig	reorganized and renamed
Center	Harper	
Center	Haskell	
Center	Kingfisher	
Center	Mayes	
Center	Woodward	
Chance	Adair	
Chandler	Comanche	
Chandler	Grady	
Chandler	Lincoln	
Checotah	McIntosh	
Chelsea	Rogers	
Cherokee	Payne	
Cherokee	Wagoner	
Cheyenne	Roger Mills	
Chickasaw	Pontotoc	
Chickasha	Grady	
Choctaw	Oklahoma	
Choteau	Mayes	
Christie	Adair	
Cimarron	Blaine	
Cimarron	Kingfisher	
Cimarron	Lincoln	
Cimarron	Logan	
Cimarron	Major	
Cimarron	Pawnee	
Cimarron	Payne	
Clark	Dewey	
Clarkson	Payne	
Clay	Alfalfa	
Clayton	Payne	
Clear Creek	Payne	
Clinton	Custer	
Cleo	Major	
Cleveland	Cimarron	
Cleveland	Dewey	
Cloud	Alfalfa	
Coal Creek	Pawnee	
Coal Creek	Wagoner	
Cobb	McIntosh	
Colbert	Bryan	
Colbert	McClain	
Coldwater	Grant	
Collinsville	Rogers	
Collinsville	Tulsa	
Columbia	Kingfisher	
Connewango	Caddo	
Cookson	Cherokee	
Cooper	Kingfisher	
Cooper	Kiowa	
Cordell	Washita	
Coronado	Kingfisher	
Costley	Craig	reorganized and renamed
Council House	Ottawa	
Coweta	Wagoner	
Cowlington	Le Flore	
Coyle	Murray	
Cravens	Latimer	
Creek	Creek	
Creek	Okfuskee	
Creek	Wagoner	
Crescent	Logan	
Crittenden	Cherokee	
Crosby	Comanche	
Cross	Grady	
Cross	Kay	
Crowell	Major	
Crutcho	Oklahoma	
Dabney	Beckham	
Dague	Texas	
Dale	Ellis	
Dale	Kay	
Damon	Latimer	
Dane	Major	
Darling	Muskogee	
Darlington	Canadian	
Davis	Pottawatomie	
Dawson	Dewey	
Dawson	Tulsa	
Day	Ellis	
Deep Creek	Major	
Deep Fork	Oklahoma	
Deer Creek	Custer	
Deer Creek	Oklahoma	
Degnan	Latimer	
Delaware	Caddo	
Delhi	Beckham	
Dent	Pottawatomie	
Denton	Beaver	
Depew	Creek	
Detroit	Woodward	
Devol	Cotton	
Dewey	Dewey	
Dewey	Oklahoma	
Dewey	Roger Mills	
Deyo	Comanche	
Diamond	Haskell	
Dill	Kiowa	
Dirigo	Grant	
Dixon	Blaine	
Doby	Harper	
Dow	Pittsburg	
Downs	Kingfisher	
Doyle	Caddo	
Driftwood	Alfalfa	
Driftwood	Woods	
Dryden	Harmon	
Duke	Jackson	
Duncan	Craig	reorganized and renamed
Dustin	Hughes	
Dutton	Grady	
Eagle	McCurtain	
Eagle	Pawnee	
Eagle	Payne	
Eagle	Woods	
Eagle Chief	Alfalfa	
Earl	Jefferson	
Earlsboro	Pottawatomie	
Eason	Pottawatomie	
East McKinley	Caddo	
East Turkey Creek	Washita	
East Walnut	Canadian	
Econtuchka	Seminole	
Eden	Payne	
Edmond	Oklahoma	
El Reno	Canadian	
Elberta	Woods	
Elder	Jackson	
Eldorado	Jackson	
Elk	Beckham	
Elk	Oklahoma	
Elm Grove	Payne	
Elmore	Garvin	
Elmwood	Beaver	
Enid	Garfield	
Erick	Beckham	
Eubank	Texas	
Euchee	Creek	
Eufala	McIntosh	
Everidge	Choctaw	
Excelsior	Kingfisher	
Fairfax	Osage	
Fairview	Grant	
Fairview	Major	
Farris	Atoka	
Ferne	Caddo	
Field	Craig	reorganized and renamed
Finley	Pushmataha	
Fitzhugh	Pontotoc	
Floris	Beaver	
Flynn	Blaine	
Flynn	Garfield	
Foraker	Osage	
Forest	Kingfisher	
Forest	Pottawatomie	
Fort Cobb	Caddo	
Fowler	McCurtain	
Francis	Harmon	
Francis	Pontotoc	
Friendship	Texas	
Frisco	Canadian	
Frisco	McCurtain	
Frisco	Texas	
Fritzlen	Woods	
Fry	Tulsa	
Galena	Woods	
Gans	Sequoyah	
Garfield	Harper	
Garland	Beaver	
Garland	Garfield	
Garner	Johnston	
Garnitz	Custer	
Garrett	Cimarron	
Garrett	Johnston	
Garvey	Woodward	
Gate	Beaver	
Gatesville	Wagoner	
Gay	Choctaw	
George	Harper	
Gibbs	Johnston	
Glencoe	Payne	
Glenpool	Tulsa	
Glenrose	Noble	
Goldsby	McClain	
Good	Harper	
Goodwell	Texas	
Gore	Grant	
Gowen	Latimer	
Gracemont	Caddo	
Graham	Carter	
Grand	Ellis	
Grand Valley	Beaver	
Grand Valley	Texas	
Grandview	Caddo	
Grandview	Cherokee	
Granite	Greer	
Grant	Custer	
Grant	Dewey	
Grant	Garfield	
Grant	Kingfisher	
Grayson	Jefferson	
Greeley	Oklahoma	
Green	Craig	reorganized and renamed
Green Valley	Woods	
Greenwood	Ellis	
Greshem	Cimarron	
Grove	Delaware	
Guthrie	Logan	
Guymon	Texas	
Hackberry	Garfield	
Hackberry	Texas	
Haddon	Dewey	
Hale	Caddo	
Hamilton	Okmulgee	
Hanna	McIntosh	
Hanson	Sequoyah	
Harper	Dewey	
Harris	Craig	reorganized and renamed
Harris	Johnston	
Harris	Muskogee	
Harrison	Dewey	
Harrison	Grady	
Harrison	Kingfisher	
Harrison	Kiowa	
Hartzell	Oklahoma	
Haskell	Coal	
Haskell	Tillman	
Hazel	Tillman	
Hazlip	Creek	
Headrick	Jackson	
Heavener	Le Flore	
Helena	Alfalfa	
Hennessey	Kingfisher	
Henrietta	Coal	
Henry	Okmulgee	
Henry	Payne	
Hewitt	Carter	
Hickory	Grant	
Hickory	Love	
Hickory	Nowata	
Hickory Ridge	Okfuskee	
Highland	Caddo	
Hillsboro	Grady	
Hobart	Garfield	
Hobart	Kiowa	
Hogan	Mayes	
Holford	Marshall	
Hollis	Harmon	
Holton	Tillman	
Homestead	Blaine	
Hominy	Osage	
Hooker	Texas	
Hope	Stephens	
Hopeton	Woods	
Hopewell	Ellis	
Hopping	McClain	
House Creek	Pawnee	
Houston	Le Flore	
Howe	Le Flore	
Hulbert	Cherokee	
Hulen	Comanche	
Hulen	Cotton	
Hunter	Choctaw	
Hunter	Tillman	
Hydro	Caddo	
Indiahoma	Comanche	
Indian	Payne	
Inola	Rogers	
Iowa	Lincoln	
Iowa	Logan	
Iron Mound	Logan	
Irwin	Woodward	
Ivanhoe	Ellis	
Jackson	Coal	
Jackson	Cotton	
Jackson	Washington	
Jacobs	Hughes	
Jarvis	Grant	
Jay	Delaware	
Jefferson	Caddo	
Jefferson	Coal	
Jefferson	Cotton	
Jefferson	Ellis	
Jefferson	Washington	
Jefferson	Woods	
Jefferson	Woodward	
Jenkins	Craig	reorganized and renamed
Jenks	Tulsa	
Jester	Greer	
Jeter	Choctaw	
Johnson	Dewey	
Johnson	McClain	
Jones	Major	
Jordan Valley	Pawnee	
Karoma	Alfalfa	
Kaw	Kay	
Kaw	Osage	
Keith	Alfalfa	
Kelley	Craig	reorganized and renamed
Kellyville	Creek	
Kemp	Bryan	
Kennady	Le Flore	
Kennedy	Blaine	
Kenton	Cimarron	
Keowee	Garfield	
Kiamichi	Pushmataha	
Kickapoo	Lincoln	
Kildare	Kay	
King	Stephens	
Kingfisher	Kingfisher	
Kiowa	Harper	
Kiowa	Pittsburg	
Kiowa	Roger Mills	
Kirk	McCurtain	
Knowles	Beaver	
Kokomo	Beaver	
Konowa	Seminole	
Kosoma	Pushmataha	
Kremlin	Garfield	
Kully Chaha	Le Flore	
Lacey	Kingfisher	
Lagoon	Pawnee	
Lake	Comanche	
Lakerside	Creek	
Lamont	Grant	
Laverne	Harper	
Lawrence	Comanche	
Lawrie	Logan	
Lawton	Blaine	
Lawton	Comanche	
Lebron	Logan	
Leeper	Murray	
Lees Creek	Adair	
Lenapah	Nowata	
Lester	Okfuskee	
Lewis	Atoka	
Lexington	Cleveland	
Liberty	Blaine	
Liberty	Cleveland	
Liberty	Grant	
Liberty	Haskell	
Liberty	Pawnee	
Liberty	Woods	
Liberty	Woodward	
Lincoln	Alfalfa	
Lincoln	Blaine	
Lincoln	Caddo	
Lincoln	Comanche	
Lincoln	Dewey	
Lincoln	Garfield	
Lincoln	Okfuskee	
Lincoln	Oklahoma	
Lincoln	Seminole	
Lindsay	Garvin	
Little	Harper	
Little River	Cleveland	
Little Robe	Dewey	
Little Rome	Ellis	
Loco	Stephens	
Logan	Beaver	
Logan	Blaine	
Logan	Garfield	
Logan	Kingfisher	
Lone Grove	Carter	
Lone Mound	Caddo	
Lone Rock	Caddo	
Lone Star	Wagoner	
Long	Sequoyah	
Longwood	Kay	
Looney	Harmon	
Loveland	Tillman	
Lowance	Murray	
Lowe	Kay	
Lowe	Noble	
Lucile	Grady	
Luther	Oklahoma	
Lynn	Kingfisher	
Lynn Lane	Tulsa	
Machire	Haskell	
Madge	Harmon	
Madison	Craig	reorganized and renamed
Madison	Washington	
Maguire	Tillman	
Manchester	Grant	
Mangan	Comanche	
Mangum	Greer	
Mannford	Creek	
Maple	Canadian	
Marble	Sequoyah	
Marella	Cimarron	
Marion	Dewey	
Marshall	Garfield	
Marshall	Kiowa	
Marshall	Logan	
Martha	Jackson	
Martin	Harmon	
Martin	Muskogee	
Matoy	Bryan	
Matthewson	Canadian	
Maxwell	Pontotoc	
Mazie	Mayes	
McDaniels	McIntosh	
McElroy	Pawnee	
McKey	Sequoyah	
McKinley	Garfield	
McKinley	Lincoln	
McKinley	Woods	
McLain	Muskogee	
McMaster	Comanche	
McNeal	Woodward	
McPherson	Stephens	
Medford	Grant	
Meno	Major	
Meridian	Roger Mills	
Merritt	Beckham	
Middleberg	Grady	
Midland	Pontotoc	
Miller	Kay	
Miller	Seminole	
Mills	Craig	reorganized and renamed
Milton	Le Flore	
Monroe	Le Flore	
Moodys	Cherokee	
Moore	Cleveland	
Moore	Muskogee	
Moore	Pottawatomie	
Morgan	Carter	
Morgan	Ellis	
Morgan	Murray	
Morris	Craig	reorganized and renamed
Morris	Okmulgee	
Morrison	Noble	
Morse	Okfuskee	
Moseley	Delaware	
Moseley	Murray	
Mound	Payne	
Mound Valley	Caddo	
Mounds	Creek	
Mountain	McCurtain	
Mountain Park	Kiowa	
Mountain View	Kiowa	
Muldrow	Sequoyah	
Mulhall	Logan	
Muncrief	McClain	
Murdock	Ellis	
Murphy	Mayes	
Murray	Coal	
Muse	Le Flore	
Mustang	Canadian	
Mustang	Oklahoma	
Myrick	Johnston	
Nabisco	Beaver	
Nabisco	Texas	
Naples	Grady	
Narcissa	Ottawa	
Nash	Muskogee	
Natura	Okmulgee	
Navajo	Jackson	
Newburg	Hughes	
Newby	Creek	
Newkirk	Kay	
Ninnekah	Grady	
Nix	Craig	reorganized and renamed
Noble	Cleveland	
Noble	Garfield	
Noble	Noble	
Norman	Cleveland	
North Cement	Caddo	
North Choctaw	Lincoln	
North Cobb	Caddo	
North Creek	Lincoln	
North Elk	Washita	
North Enid	Garfield	
North Fork	Beckham	
North Fox	Lincoln	
North Keokuk	Lincoln	
North Lathram	Caddo	
North Seminole	Lincoln	
North Wichita	Lincoln	
Nowata	Nowata	
Numa	Grant	
Oak	Canadian	
Oakdale	Noble	
Oakdale	Washita	
Oakes	Choctaw	
Oakview	Logan	
O'Bryan	Woods	
Octavia	Le Flore	
Odell	Marshall	
Ogle	Muskogee	
Ohio	Ellis	
Okemah	Okfuskee	
Okfuskee	Okfuskee	
Oklahoma	Oklahoma	
Oleta	Ellis	
Olive	Creek	
Olive	Garfield	
Oliver	Ellis	
Olustee	Jackson	
Omega	Kingfisher	
Oolagah	Rogers	
Oowalah	Rogers	
Optima	Texas	
Orlando	Logan	
Osage	Lincoln	
Osborn	Garfield	
Otoe	Lincoln	
Otoe	Noble	
Otoe	Pawnee	
Ottawa	Ottawa	
Otter	Ellis	
Otter	Garfield	
Otter	Harper	
Otter	Kingfisher	
Otter Creek	Kiowa	
Owasso	Tulsa	
Owen	Kay	
Paden	Okfuskee	
Page	Le Flore	
Painter	Comanche	
Paradise	Payne	
Park	Kingfisher	
Park Hill	Cherokee	
Parkman	Ellis	
Parks	Stephens	
Parsons	Alfalfa	
Pascoe	Okmulgee	
Patterson	Garfield	
Patterson	Jefferson	
Patterson	Woods	
Paw Paw	Sequoyah	
Pawnee	Lincoln	
Pawnee	Pawnee	
Pawnee	Payne	
Peggs	Cherokee	
Penn	Woods	
Penn	Woodward	
Peoria	Ottawa	
Perkins	Payne	
Perry	Noble	
Phillips	Coal	
Pleasant View	Texas	
Poarch	Beckham	
Pocasset	Grady	
Pocola	Le Flore	
Ponca	Lincoln	
Porter	Wagoner	
Porum	Muskogee	
Poteau	Le Flore	
Pottawatomie	Oklahoma	
Prairie	Canadian	
Prairie	Grant	
Prairie Valley	Grady	
Price	Jefferson	
Prices Chapel	Sequoyah	
Pursley	Grady	
Quanah	Comanche	
Quapaw	Ottawa	
Quartz	Greer	
Quinlan	Major	
Quinton	Pittsburg	
Rainey	Washita	
Raney	Greer	
Range	Texas	
Ratliff	Johnston	
Ratliffe	Choctaw	
Rawdon	Ellis	
Red Fork	Tulsa	
Red Mound	Seminole	
Red Oak	Latimer	
Red Point	Texas	
Red River	Tillman	
Red Rock	Noble	
Redland	Sequoyah	
Reed	Garfield	
Reno	Canadian	
Rentfrow	Kay	
Reserve	Kingfisher	
Richland	Beckham	
Richland	Comanche	
Richland	Stephens	
Richland	Tillman	
Rider	Mayes	
River	Blaine	
River	Kingfisher	
River	Mayes	
Rock	Ellis	
Rock	Noble	
Rock Creek	Pottawatomie	
Rock Creek	Stephens	
Rock Falls	Kay	
Rock Island	Canadian	
Rock Island	Grant	
Rocky Mountain	Sequoyah	
Roland	Sequoyah	
Rose	Payne	
Rosehill	Logan	
Round Grove	Alfalfa	
Round Grove	Kay	
Rush Springs	Grady	
Ryals	McIntosh	
Saddle Mountain	Comanche	
Sadie	Sequoyah	
Saline	Alfalfa	
Saline	Delaware	
Saline	Harper	
Saline	Mayes	
Sallisaw	Sequoyah	
Salonia	Latimer	
Salt Fork	Grant	
Sandy Hook	Cimarron	
Sans Bois	Haskell	
Santa Fe	Noble	
Sapulpa	Creek	
Savannah	Pittsburg	
Sayre	Beckham	
Schulter	Okmulgee	
Seay	Blaine	
Seger	Washita	
Seiling	Dewey	
Severs	Okmulgee	
Seward	Logan	
Shady Point	Le Flore	
Shahan	Wagoner	
Shannon	Creek	
Shannon	Wagoner	
Sheldon	Ellis	
Sheridan	Garfield	
Sheridan	Major	
Sherman	Kingfisher	
Shirley	Grady	
Sickle	Dewey	
Sickles	Caddo	
Simpson	Dewey	
Simpson	McIntosh	
Skedee	Pawnee	
Skeleton	Garfield	
Skeleton	Kingfisher	
Sledgeville	Texas	
Snow Creek	Nowata	
South Cement	Caddo	
South Choctaw	Lincoln	
South Creek	Lincoln	
South Elk	Washita	
South Fox	Lincoln	
South Keokuk	Lincoln	
South Lathram	Caddo	
South Seminole	Lincoln	
South Wichita	Lincoln	
Speairs	Bryan	
Speermoore	Harper	
Speers	Craig	reorganized and renamed
Spiro	Le Flore	
Spring	Alfalfa	
Spring	Woods	
Spring Creek	Logan	
Spring Creek	Oklahoma	
Springer	Logan	
Springer	Oklahoma	
Springvale	Logan	
St. Louis	Pottawatomie	
Starr	Grady	
Stella	Alfalfa	
Stella	Cleveland	
Stephens	Tillman	
Stillwater	Payne	
Stilwell	Adair	
Stone	Major	
Stone Bluff	Muskogee	
Stonewall	Pontotoc	
Stratford	Garvin	
Stratton	Texas	
Strauss	Cotton	
Straight	Texas	
Streeter	Roger Mills	
Strike Axe	Osage	
Stringtown	Atoka	
Stuart	Hughes	
Sulphur	McCurtain	
Summerfield	Le Flore	
Sumner	Garfield	
Sunny Slope	Creek	
Supply	Woodward	
Sutton	Muskogee	
Tabler	Grady	
Talahina	Le Flore	
Talala	Rogers	
Taliaferro	Marshall	
Taloga	Dewey	
Taloka	Haskell	
Tatums	Carter	
Taylor	Cleveland	
Tepee	Texas	
Texas	Cotton	
Texas	Washita	
Texhoma	Texas	
Texola	Beckham	
Thomas	Johnston	
Thornton	Craig	reorganized and renamed
Ti	Pittsburg	
Tiger	Creek	
Tiger	Okmulgee	
Tilly	Greer	
Todd	Craig	reorganized and renamed
Tohee	Lincoln	
Tonkawa	Caddo	
Tonkawa	Kay	
Township Number 1	Craig	
Township Number 2	Craig	
Township Number 3	Craig	
Township Number 4	Craig	
Township Number 5	Craig	
Township Number 6	Craig	
Township Number 7	Craig	
Township Number 8	Craig	
Township Number 9	Craig	
Township Number 10	Craig	
Trail	Dewey	
Tullahassee	Wagoner	
Turkey	Texas	
Turnbull	McClain	
Turner	Carter	
Turner	McIntosh	
Tuskahoma	Pushmataha	
Tuttle	Grady	
Tyler	Craig	reorganized and renamed
Union	Canadian	
Union	Garfield	
Union	Grady	
Union	Kingfisher	
Union	Lincoln	
Union	Payne	
Union	Washita	
Union	Woodward	
Valley	Canadian	
Valley	Grant	
Valley	Pawnee	
Valley	Woods	
Van	Major	
Vann	Muskogee	
Verdigris	Rogers	
Vernon	Kay	
Vian	Sequoyah	
Victor	McClain	
Vincent	Grady	
Waconda	Caddo	
Wakita	Grant	
Waldron	Grady	
Walker	Garvin	
Wall	Stephens	
Walnut	Caddo	
Walnut	Noble	
Walnut Grove	Woods	
Waltham	Kay	
Ware	Grant	
Warr Acres	Oklahoma	
Warren Valley	Noble	
Washington	Garfield	
Washington	Grady	
Washington	Love	
Washita	Custer	
Washita	Roger Mills	
Watkins	Noble	
Watonga	Blaine	
Watova	Nowata	
Wauhillau	Adair	
Waukomis	Garfield	
Wayne	McClain	
Waynoka	Woods	
Webb	Dewey	
Webster	Woodward	
Wekiwa	Tulsa	became city of Sand Springs
Welch	Craig	reorganized and renamed
Weleetka	Okfuskee	
Wells	Blaine	
Wellston	Lincoln	
West McKinley	Caddo	
West Turkey Creek	Washita	
West Walnut	Canadian	
Weston	Kay	
Westville	Adair	
Wetumka	Hughes	
White	McCurtain	
White Bread	Caddo	
White Rock	Noble	
Whitehead	Garvin	
Whitehorse	Woods	
Wichita	Comanche	
Wilcox	Roger Mills	
Wilis	Craig	reorganized and renamed
Willis	Marshall	
Willow Bar	Cimarron	
Willow	Caddo	
Willow	Greer	
Willow Springs	Tulsa	
Wilson	Atoka	
Wilson	Carter	
Wilson	Choctaw	
Wilson	Harper	
Wilson	McCurtain	
Wireless	Cimarron	
Wister	Le Flore	
Wolfe	Craig	reorganized and renamed
Wolk	Seminole	
Wood	Garfield	
Woodall	Craig	reorganized and renamed
Woodland	Logan	
Woodrow	Ellis	
Woodward	Woodward	
Wray	Jefferson	
Wright	Jefferson	
Wyandotte	Ottawa	
Yeager	Hughes	
Yellowstone	Woods	
Yukon	Canadian	
Zella	Comanche	

== See also ==
- List of counties in Oklahoma
- List of municipalities in Oklahoma
