= Pleasant Valley School (Stillwater, Oklahoma) =

- U.S. National Register of Historic Places
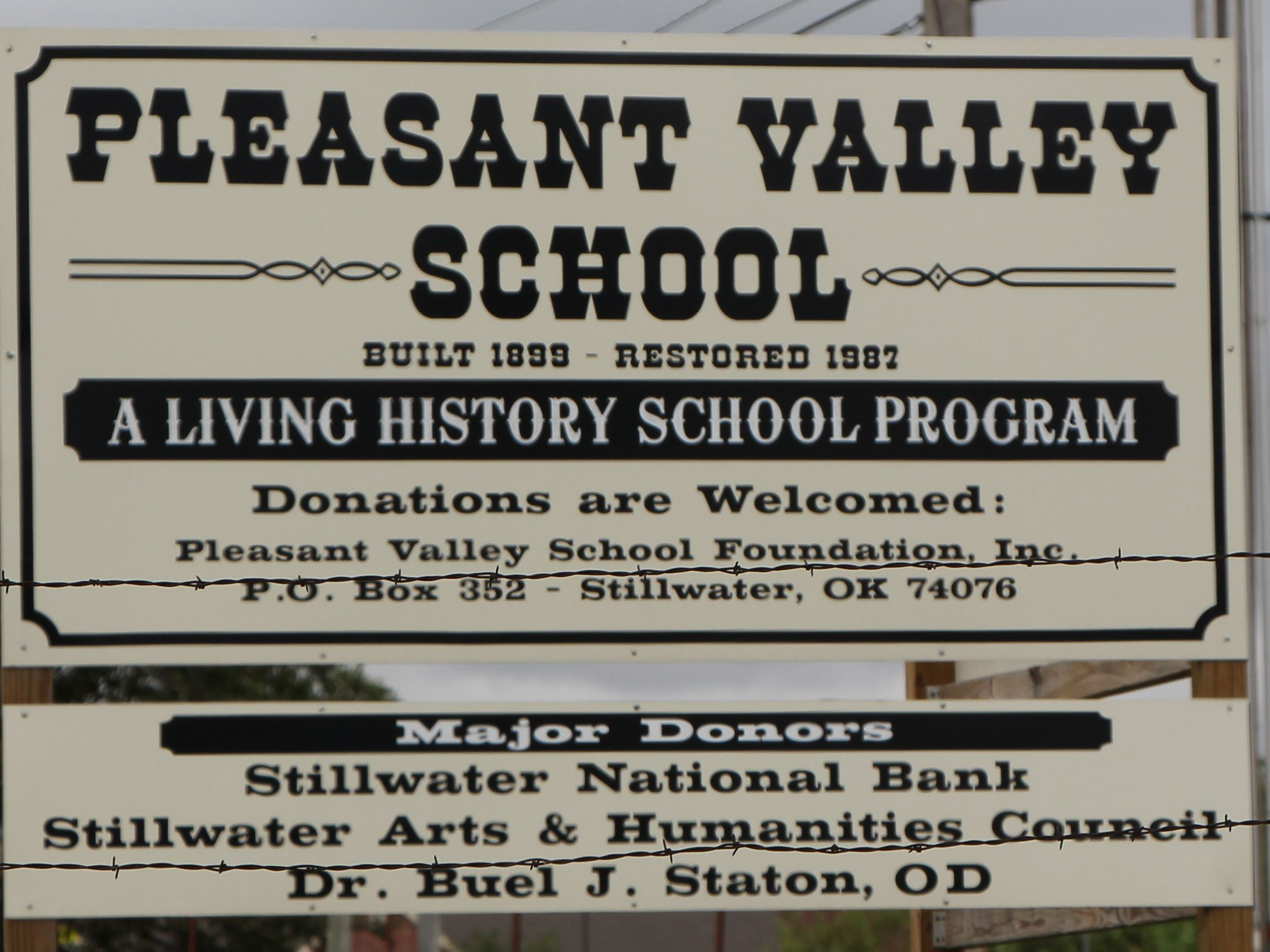
- Pleasant Valley School sign

- Location within Oklahoma Location within the United States
- Location: 1901 S. Sangre Rd., Payne County, Stillwater, Oklahoma
- Coordinates: 36°6′2″N 97°6′16″W
- Area: 1.5 acres (0.61 ha)
- Built: 1899
- NRHP reference No.: 90002182
- Added to NRHP: January 25, 1991

The Pleasant Valley School building is an example of a one-room country school that was common throughout Oklahoma during the late 1800s and early 1900s. The building was built in 1899 and continued to function as a one-room school until 1941. It remains the only extant one-room, frame school building in Payne County. It is one of the very few in Oklahoma still located on its original site and still playing the role of an educational and social center.

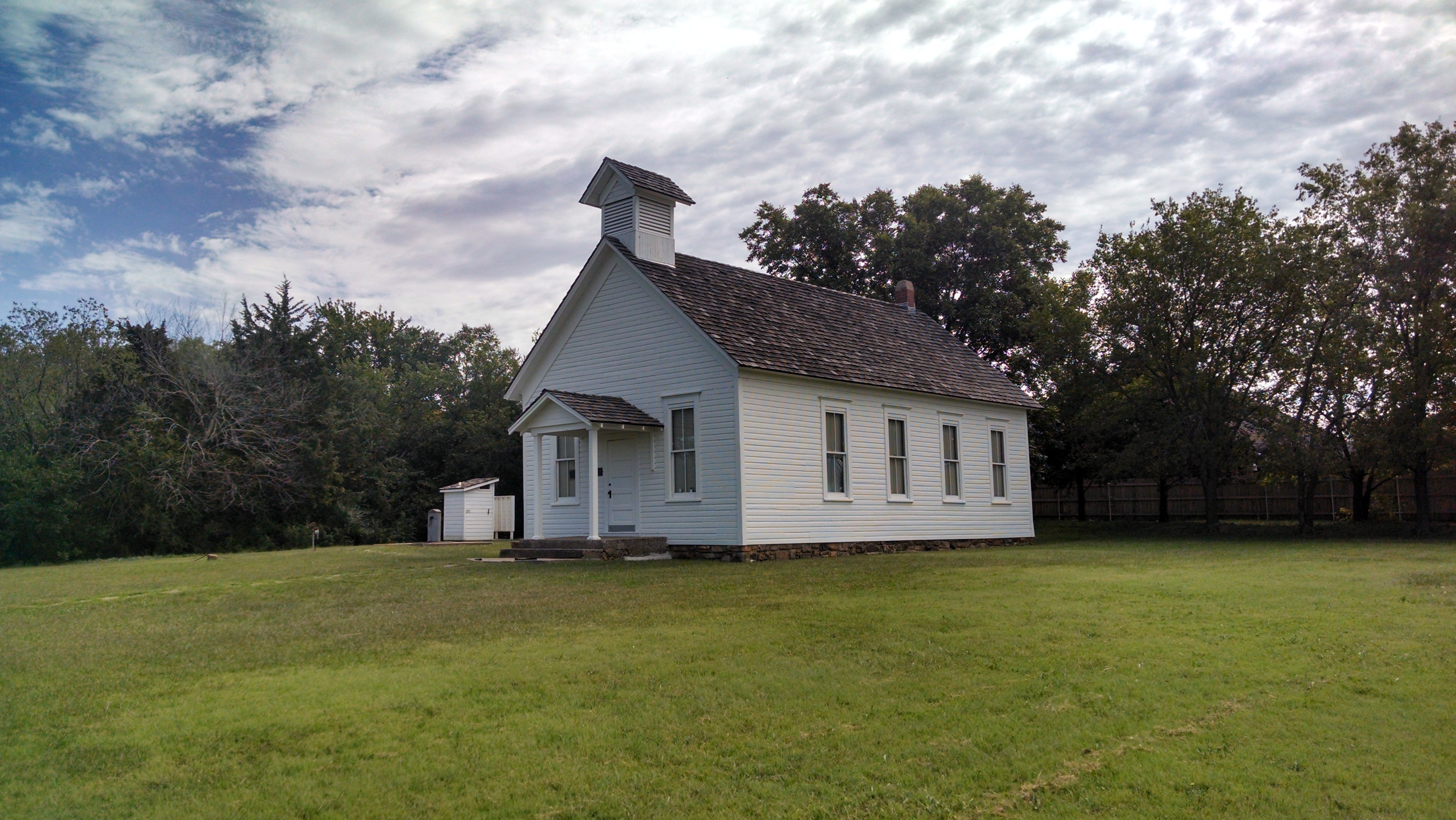
Pleasant Valley School

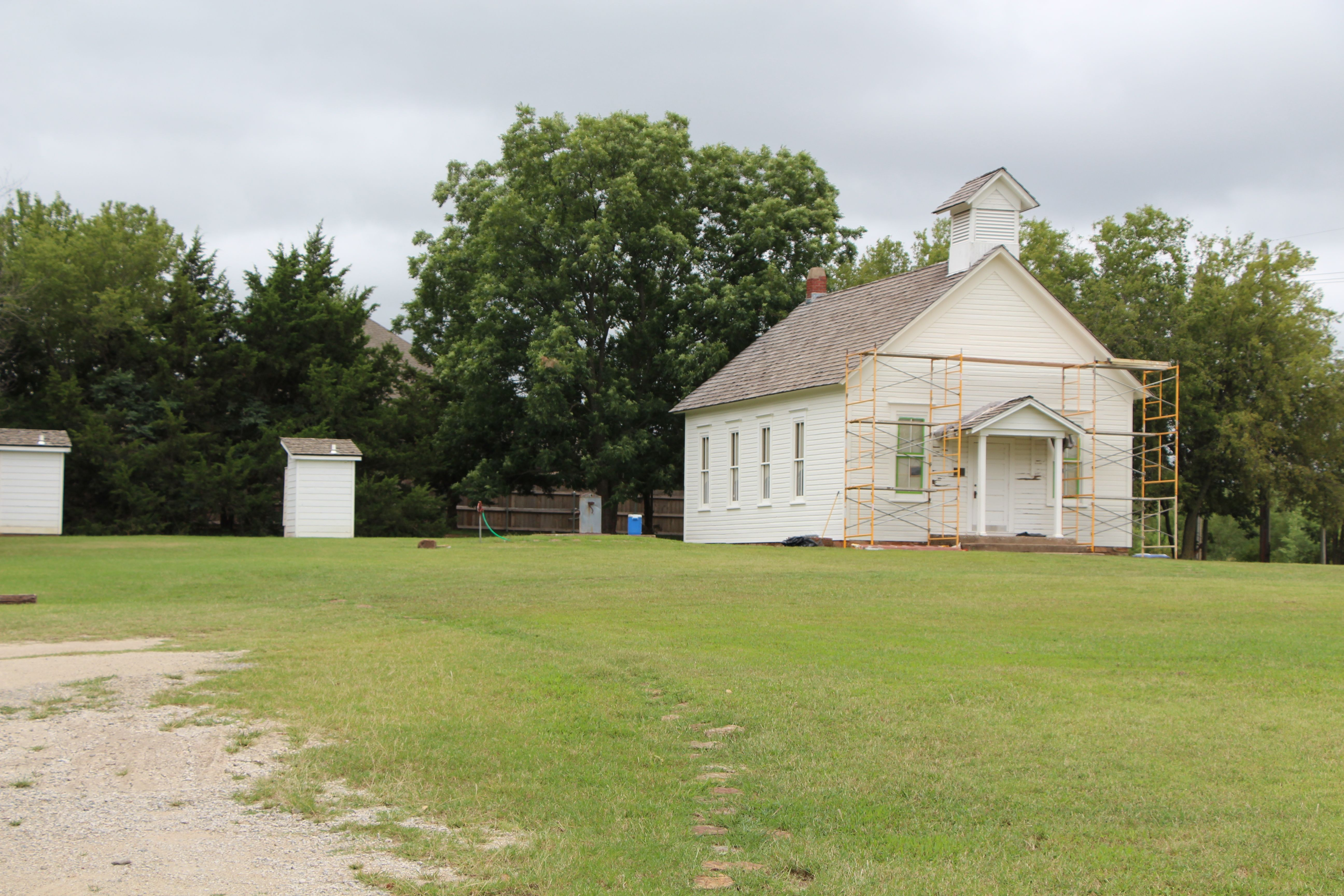
Pleasant Valley School, Stillwater, Oklahoma
