= List of members of the Oklahoma Territorial Legislature =

Members of the Oklahoma Territorial Legislature served in one of eight legislative sessions between 1890 and 1905. The following list of legislators for Oklahoma Territory are listed below by legislative session from Joseph Bradfield Thoburn's 1916 A Standard History of Oklahoma.

== First legislature ==
The first legislative assembly served between 1890 and 1891.

=== Council ===
- First District: Charles Brown, John Foster, and John F. Linn
- Second District: James L. Brown, John W. Howard, and Leander G. Pitman
- Third District: Robert J. Nisbitt
- Fourth District: Joseph Smelset
- Fifth District: Mort L. Bixler
- Sixth District: Daniel Harrady and W. A. McCartney
- Seventh District: George Gardenhire
- Eight District: Charles F. Grimmer

=== House ===
- First District: Robert J. Barker, William H. Campbell, Samuel M. Lewis, William H. Merten, William S. Robertson, and James L. Smith
- Second District: Moses Neal, Charles G. Jones, Samuel D. Pack, D. W. Peery, and Hugh G. Trosper
- Third District: William C. Adair, James M. Stovall, and Thomas R. Waggoner
- Fourth District: Arthur N. Daniels, Demetrius W. Talbot, and John H. Wimberly
- Fifth District: Green Currin, Darius C. Farnsworth, Joseph C. Post, and Edward G. Tritt
- Sixth District: Samuel W. Clark, James L. Mathews, and Ira N. Terrill
- Seventh District: Elisha H. Long
- Eight District: A. M. Colson

== Second legislature ==
The second legislative assembly served in 1893.

=== Council ===
- First District: John M. Cannon
- Second District: C. H. Carswell
- Third District: J. W. Clevenger
- Fourth District: O. R. Fegan
- Fifth District: J. P. Lane
- Sixth District: J. C. Pringley
- Seventh District: L. G. Pitman
- Eight District: Leslie P. Ross
- Ninth District: William A. McCartney
- Tenth District: Hugh McCredie
- Eleventh District: F. S. Pulliam
- Twelfth District: J. J. Shaffer
- Thirteenth District: C. J. Wrightsman

=== House ===
- First District: Talcott Ormsbie
- Second District: J. M. Johnson
- Third District: W. B. Stone
- Fourth District: R. C. Brennon
- Fifth District: John H. Wimberly
- Sixth District: C. H. Allen
- Seventh District: M. L. Stanley
- Eight District: J. M. Faris
- Ninth District: John Pfaff
- Tenth District: John W. Ozmun
- Eleventh District: John W. Beatty
- Twelfth District: D. W. Peery
- Thirteenth District: John C. Carrington
- Fourteenth District: Thomas R. Waggoner
- Fifteenth District: J. M. Stovall
- Sixteenth District: John W. Moyle
- Seventeenth District: B. J. Clardy
- Eighteenth District: W. A. Scott
- Nineteenth District: J. J. Merrick
- Twentieth District: O. P. Rathbun
- Twenty-first District: Jasper K. Allen
- Twenty-second District: David J. Wallace
- Twenty-third District: W. B. Stone
- Twenty-fourth District: Harper S. Cunningham
- Twenty-fifth District: Frank Hilton Greer
- Twenty-sixth District: Jasper J. McDaniel

== Third legislature ==
The third legislative assembly served in 1895.

=== Council ===
- First District: James E. Doom
- Second District: John S. Allan
- Third District: Angelo C. Scott
- Fourth District: J. H. Pitzer
- Fifth District: A. H. Boles
- Sixth District: E. H. Spencer
- Seventh District: O. B. Fegan
- Eight District: B. B. Tankersley
- Ninth District: C. T. Prouty
- Tenth District: J. P. Gandy
- Eleventh District: H. D. Baker
- Twelfth District: George D. Orner
- Thirteenth District: R. J. Ray

=== House ===
- First District: N. B. DeFord
- Second District: Charles Brown
- Third District: S. A. Waite
- Fourth District: R. J. Nesbitt
- Fifth District: H. C. St. John
- Sixth District: James Brown
- Seventh District: A. N. Spencer
- Eight District: H. A. Todd
- Ninth District: G. W. Sutton
- Tenth District: William T. Little
- Eleventh District: W. A. Hogan
- Twelfth District: Robert Lowery
- Thirteenth District: W. H. Mason
- Fourteenth District: C. M. Barnes
- Fifteenth District: J. S. Wade
- Sixteenth District: W. A. Knipe
- Seventeenth District: M. P. McCoy
- Eighteenth District: G. W. Posten
- Nineteenth District: R. H. Walling
- Twentieth District: G. W. Vickers
- Twenty-first District: C. G. Elliott
- Twenty-second District: W. H. Smith
- Twenty-third District: T. T. Boyer
- Twenty-fourth District: G. S. Stine
- Twenty-fifth District: G. W. Bradfield
- Twenty-sixth District: W. F. Hendrix

== Fourth legislature ==
The fourth legislative assembly served in 1897.

=== Council ===
- First District: J. W. Lynch
- Second District: Henry S. Johnston
- Third District: H. S. Hanner
- Fourth District: Charles N. Brown
- Fifth District: A. W. Fisher
- Sixth District: J. W. Johnson
- Seventh District: C. W. Gould
- Eight District: D. B. Learned
- Ninth District: J. D. DeBois
- Tenth District: Erastus J. Clark
- Eleventh District: William Garrison
- Twelfth District: D. S. Randolph
- Thirteenth District: D. P. Marum

=== House ===
- First District: Jacob W. May
- Second District: D. S. Rose
- Third District: Thomas H. Doyle
- Fourth District: John Hogan
- Fifth District: Dale Lytton
- Sixth District: E. E. Olson
- Seventh District: M. E. Ferguson
- Eight District: W. Christian
- Ninth District: J. M. Stovall
- Tenth District: E. B. Allen
- Eleventh District: William James Gault
- Twelfth District: James K. Graves
- Thirteenth District: Ben F. Wilson
- Fourteenth District: J. C. Tousley
- Fifteenth District: R. B. Shannon
- Sixteenth District: Thomas E. Willis
- Seventeenth District: C. M. Barnes
- Eighteenth District: W. L. Sullivan
- Nineteenth District: William R. Berry
- Twentieth District: Albert H. Ellis
- Twenty-first District: T. J. Woodmansee
- Twenty-second District: L. M. St. Clair
- Twenty-third District: George W. Vickers
- Twenty-fourth District: J. P. D. Mouriquand
- Twenty-fifth District: G. P. Cherry
- Twenty-sixth District: J. E. George

== Fifth legislature ==
The fifth legislative assembly served in 1899.

=== Council ===
- First District: George H. Brett
- Second District: A. J. Biddison
- Third District: Frank A. Hutto
- Fourth District: Hugh McCreadie
- Fifth District: B. P. Magness
- Sixth District: Sidney Clarke
- Seventh District: George W. Bellamy
- Eight District: Felix L. Winkler
- Ninth District: Abram H. Huston
- Tenth District: Harrison E. Havens
- Eleventh District: William Garrison
- Twelfth District: James P. Gandy
- Thirteenth District: Charles M. Thacker

=== House ===
- First District: John H. Smith
- Second District: James Wilkin
- Third District: Thomas H. Doyle
- Fourth District: Houston A. Thomas
- Fifth District: E. F. Clarke
- Sixth District: W. F. Malley
- Seventh District: John W. Scott
- Eight District: J. D. Combs
- Ninth District: E. Duffy
- Tenth District: J. C. Wails
- Eleventh District: Charles G. Jones
- Twelfth District: C. W. Olmstead
- Thirteenth District: J. W. Hadley
- Fourteenth District: Thomas R. Reid
- Fifteenth District: D. H. VanKirk
- Sixteenth District: Walter C. Stevens
- Seventeenth District: W. H. Merten
- Eighteenth District: J. M. Holliday
- Nineteenth District: Virgil A. Wood
- Twentieth District: C. F. McElrath
- Twenty-first District: Fred S. Sherer
- Twenty-second District: J. M. Hay
- Twenty-third District: E. E. Hartshorn
- Twenty-fourth District: Philip Koch
- Twenty-fifth District: J. D. Ballard
- Twenty-sixth District: J. C. Williamson

== Sixth legislature ==
The sixth legislative assembly served in 1901.

=== Council ===
- First District: H. C. R. Brodboll
- Second District: James P. Woolsey
- Third District: Freeman E. Miller
- Fourth District: J. F. Todd
- Fifth District: E. Duffy
- Sixth District: Sidney Clarke
- Seventh District: George W. Bellamy
- Eight District: Felix L. Winkler
- Ninth District: John C. Foster
- Tenth District: R. E. P. Messall
- Eleventh District: George H. Coulson
- Twelfth District: A. G. Updegraff
- Thirteenth District: George B. Harrison

=== House ===
- First District: W. M. Ferguson
- Second District: James Wilkin
- Third District: John A. Oliphant
- Fourth District: Houston A. Thomas
- Fifth District: James L. Mathews
- Sixth District: William H. Scott
- Seventh District: John Embry
- Eight District: Robert E. Woods
- Ninth District: B. F. Nisbett
- Tenth District: Walter L. Phelps
- Eleventh District: Charles G. Jones
- Twelfth District: John W. Comp
- Thirteenth District: James W. Hadley
- Fourteenth District: Thomas R. Reid
- Fifteenth District: D. H. VanKirk
- Sixteenth District: Walter C. Stevens
- Seventeenth District: Cyrus E. Seeley
- Eighteenth District: Miles W. Allen
- Nineteenth District: Ret Millard
- Twentieth District: Frank R. Rogers
- Twenty-first District: John H. Decker
- Twenty-second District: Henry M. Brewer
- Twenty-third District: August T. Sniggs
- Twenty-fourth District: John H. Campbell
- Twenty-fifth District: Frank Mathews
- Twenty-sixth District: Charles R. Alexander

== Seventh legislature ==
The seventh legislative assembly served in 1903.

=== Council ===
- First District: James P. Woolsey
- Second District: John P. Hickam
- Third District: John Calvin Foster
- Fourth District: R. M. Campbell
- Fifth District: John O. Blakeney
- Sixth District: Herbert H. Champlin
- Seventh District: Felix L. Winkler
- Eight District: Alva G. Updegraff
- Ninth District: George T. Webster
- Tenth District: Charles R. Alexander
- Eleventh District: Thomas P. Gore
- Twelfth District: Sam Massingale
- Thirteenth District: Frank Mathews

=== House ===
- First District: James Wilkin
- Second District: William M. Bowles
- Third District: Herbert W. Williams
- Fourth District: James L. Mathews
- Fifth District: James J. Merrick
- Sixth District: Edgar W. Jones
- Seventh District: John Threadgill
- Eight District: Fred L. Wagoner
- Ninth District: B. F. Nisbett
- Tenth District: William T. James
- Eleventh District: John H. Decker
- Twelfth District: S. Grimes Sproat
- Thirteenth District: J. P. Cummins
- Fourteenth District: William A. Maxwell
- Fifteenth District: A. McTaggart
- Sixteenth District: Jonathan C. Major
- Seventeenth District: Thomas J. Ballew
- Eighteenth District: Evert J. Murphy
- Nineteenth District: Thomas P. Braidwood
- Twentieth District: Jesse H. Jones
- Twenty-first District: Dyke Ballinger
- Twenty-second District: Joseph K. Tuttle
- Twenty-third District: Joseph A. Jester
- Twenty-fourth District: James W. Harrison
- Twenty-fifth District: W. P. Francis
- Twenty-sixth District: T. M. Robinson

== Eighth legislature ==
The eighth legislative assembly served in 1905.

=== Council ===
- First District: Joel R. Scott
- Second District: John P. Hickam
- Third District: Leslie G. Niblack
- Fourth District: John Threadgill
- Fifth District: E. L. Cralle
- Sixth District: John H. Decker
- Seventh District: Felix L. Winkler
- Eight District: A. L. Sharrock
- Ninth District: Evert J. Murphy
- Tenth District: Charles R. Alexander
- Eleventh District: James Menefee
- Twelfth District: B. N. Woodson
- Thirteenth District: W. P. Francis

=== House ===
- First District: J. B. Norton
- Second District: Wesley Taylor
- Third District: J. T. Craig
- Fourth District: W. N. Walker
- Fifth District: Frank Pouty
- Sixth District: Isaac B. Levy
- Seventh District: R. R. Fuller
- Eight District: John J. Gayman
- Ninth District: Milton Bryan
- Tenth District: J. D. Lydick
- Eleventh District: J. P. Becker
- Twelfth District: John Ingmire
- Thirteenth District: W. W. Noffsinger
- Fourteenth District: W. A. Maxwell
- Fifteenth District: C. E. Wood
- Sixteenth District: A. J. Ross
- Seventeenth District: A. McBride
- Eighteenth District: B. B. Bone
- Nineteenth District: J. P. Gandy
- Twentieth District: W. W. Daniels
- Twenty-first District: Dyke Ballinger
- Twenty-second District: Scott Ferris
- Twenty-third District: J. A. Jester
- Twenty-fourth District: O. J. Logan
- Twenty-fifth District: David Hogg
- Twenty-sixth District: T. W. Robinson

== Works cited ==
Thoburn, Joseph B. (Joseph Bradfield) (1916). A Standard History of Oklahoma. Chicago, New York: The American Historical Society. pp. 915–922.
