= List of Oklahoma State University buildings =

== Academic facilities ==
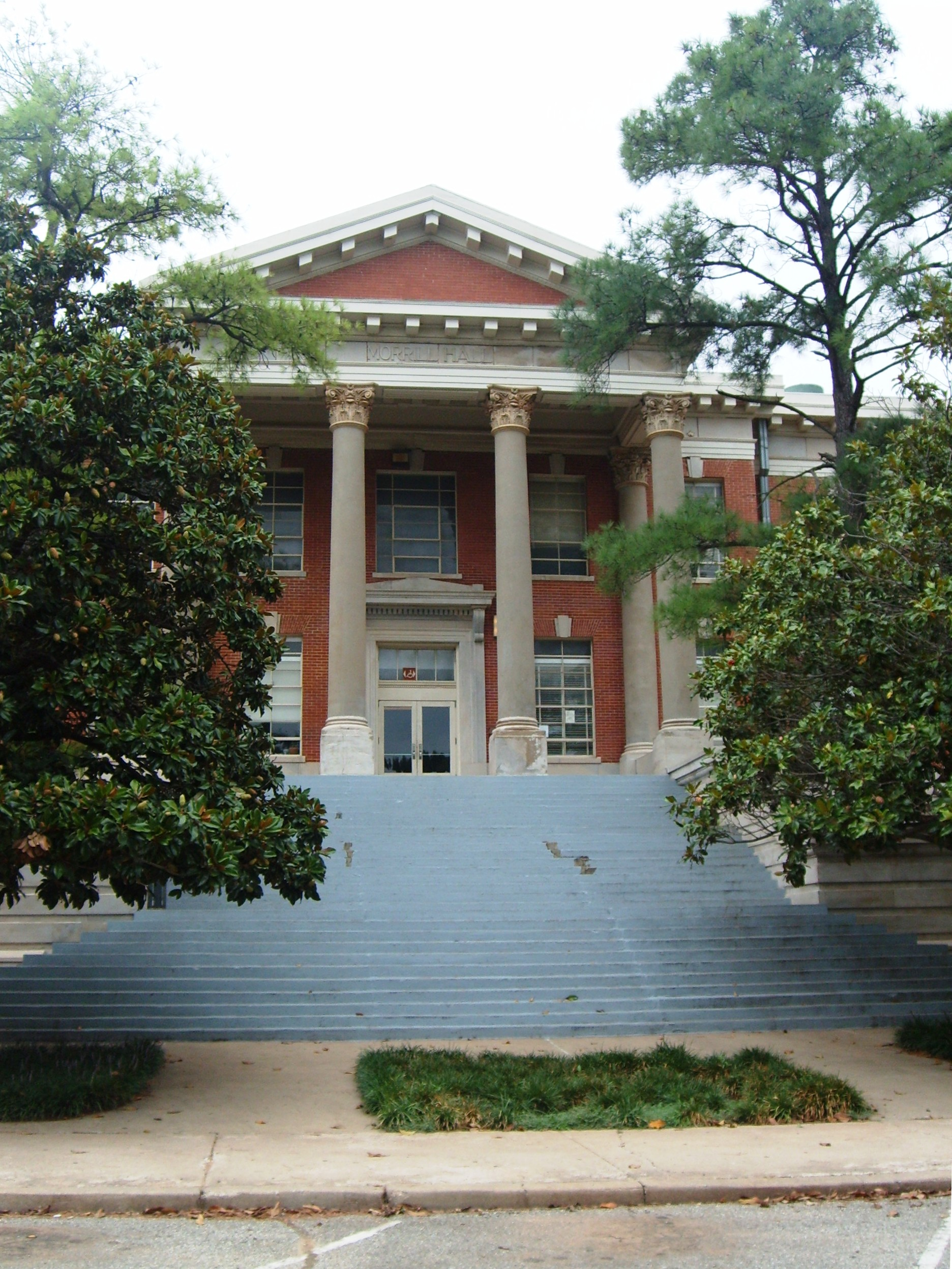
Morrill Hall

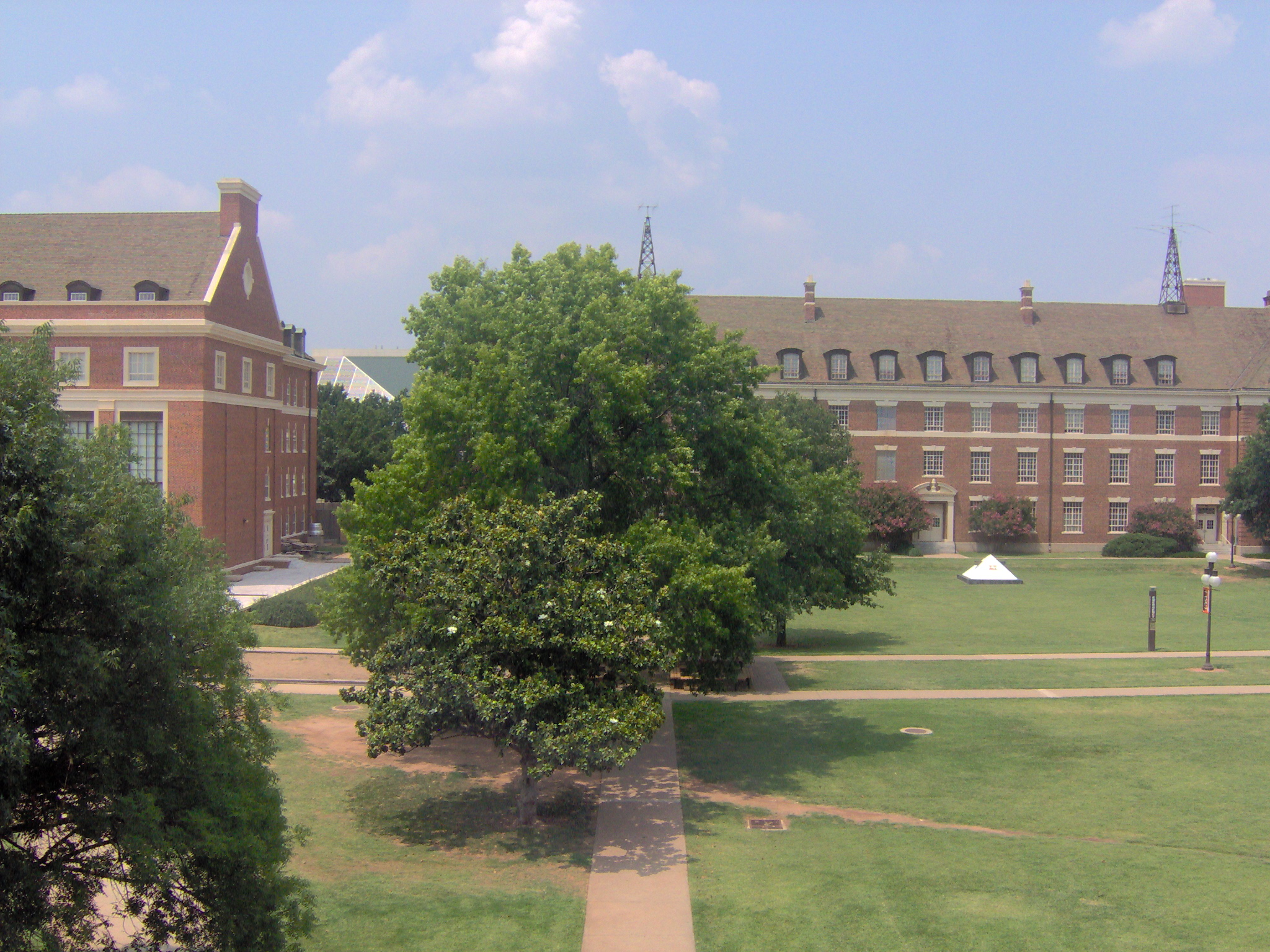
Engineering South and Edmon Low Library – view from classroom building

- Advanced Technology Research Center
- Agricultural Center Offices
- Agricultural Hall
- Animal Disease Diagnostic Laboratory
- Animal Sciences
- Architecture Building
- Bartlett Center for the Visual Arts
- BioSystems and Agricultural Engineering Laboratory
- Boren Veterinary Medicine Teaching Hospital
- Business Building
- Civil Engineering Laboratory
- Classroom Building
- Controlled Environmental Research Laboratory
- Cordell Hall
- Edmon Low Library
- Electronics Laboratory
- Engineering North
- Engineering South
- Fire Protection and Safety Technology Laboratory
- Food and Agricultural Products Research and Technology Center
- Greenhouses
- Gundersen Hall
- Hanner Hall
- Hazardous Reaction Laboratory
- Human Environmental Sciences
- Human Environmental Sciences West
- Library Annex
- Life Sciences East
- Life Sciences West
- MAE Research Laboratory
- Math Sciences
- McElroy Hall
- Morrill Hall
- Noble Research Center
- North Classroom Building (finished late 2008)
- Paul Miller Journalism and Broadcasting Building
- Physical Sciences
- Scott Hall
- Seretean Center For the Performing Arts
- Social Sciences and Humanities (formerly known as Murray Hall)
- Thatcher Hall
- Visual Arts Annex
- Willard Hall

== Athletic facilities ==
- Allie P. Reynolds Stadium
- Boone Pickens Stadium
- Cowboy Tennis Complex
- Cowgirl Soccer Stadium
- Cowgirl Softball Complex
- Equestrian Center
- Gallagher-Iba Arena
- Indoor Hitting Facility
- K. B. Droke Track Center
- National Wrestling Hall of Fame and Museum
- Michael and Anne Greenwood Tennis Center
- Sherman E. Smith Training Center

== Residential facilities ==
=== Traditional halls ===
- Iba Hall
- Kerr-Drummond Hall (closed)
- Scott Hall (closed)
- Parker Hall
- Stout Hall
- University Commons
- Wentz Hall
- Willham Hall (tore down)
- Hubble Hall

=== Suite-style halls ===
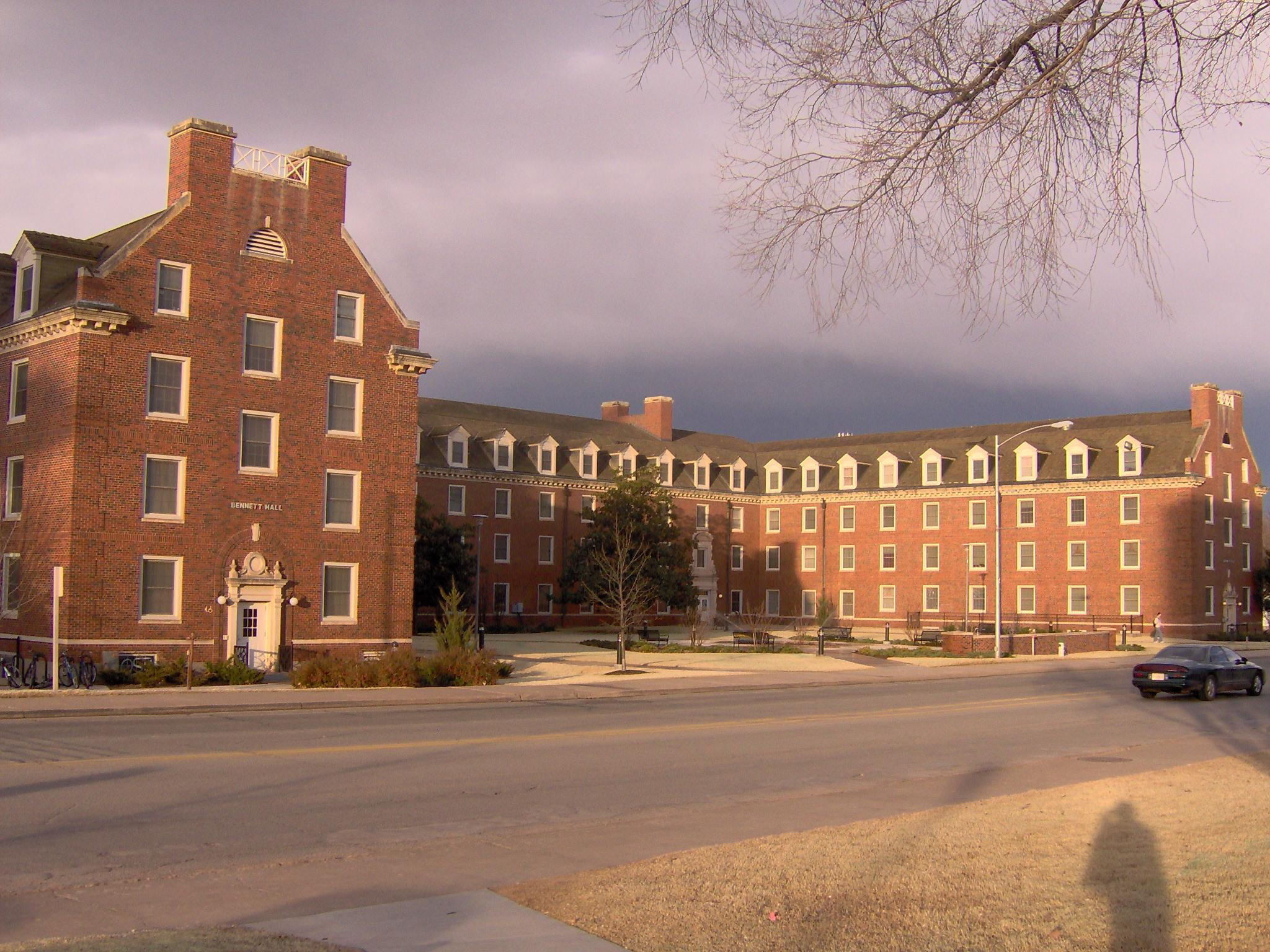
Bennett Hall

- Bennett Hall
- Booker-Stichcomb Hall
- Patchin-Jones Hall
- Village A-F Suites
- Zink-Allen Hall

=== Apartments ===
- Bost Hall
- Brumley Apartments
- Davis Hall
- Demaree Apartments
- Kamm Hall
- McPherson Hall
- Morsani-Smith Hall
- Morrison Apartments
- Peterson-Friend Hall
- Prosser Apartments
- Sitlington Hall
- Stevens Apartments
- West Apartments
- Williams Apartments
- Young Hall

== Student life and Administrative services ==
- Willham House (President's Residence)
- 4-H Youth Development
- Bennett Memorial Chapel
- Central Dining Services
- Colvin Center Annex
- Colvin Recreation Center
- Conoco Philips Alumni Center
- Family Resource Center
- Fire Station
- Griffith Community Center
- Intramural Fields
- Kerr Drummond Mezzanine
- Laundry Married Student Housing
- Patillo's Community Center
- Physical Plant Services
- Power Plant
- Public Information Office (PIO)
- Scott Pasker Wentz Café
- Seretean Wellness Center
- Student Union
- Telecommunications Center
- The Market
- Transportation Services
- University Health Services
- USDA Building
- Vocational Technology Print Shop
- Wes Watkins Center
- Whitehurst Hall administration building

== Facilities under construction or renovation ==
- Intermodal Transportation Facility (starting Spring 2007)
- McKnight Center for the Performing Arts (finishing in October 2019)
- Old Central (renovation starting Summer 2007)
- South Murray Hall (renovation starting Summer 2007)
- Oklahoma Animal Disease Diagnostic Laboratory
- University Printing Services

== Notable buildings demolished ==
- Williams Hall, demolished 1969, nicknamed the Castle of the Prairies
- Home Economics/Geography building, demolished 2005
- Library Building
- Willham Hall complex, demolished 2005
- Ceramics
- Dairy Building
- Cordell Hall, demolished 2018

== See also ==
- Oklahoma State University–Stillwater
