= David J. Wallace (Oklahoma politician) =

African American politician and attorney (1850 to 1928)

Member of the Oklahoma Territorial Legislature from the 22nd district
- In office 1893–1895
- Preceded by: District created
- Succeeded by: W. H. Smith

Personal details
- Born: c. 1850 South Carolina
- Died: September 13, 1928 Okmulgee, Oklahoma
- Education: Wiley University

David J. Wallace (ca. 1850– September 13, 1928) was an African American politician, attorney, and community leader in Oklahoma. Born in South Carolina, Wallace was among a number of African Americans who moved to pre-statehood Oklahoma in search of opportunity.

In 1893, he was elected to represent the 22nd district in the second session of the Oklahoma Territorial Legislature, becoming the second African American who served in the body.

== Early life and education ==
Wallace was born into slavery circa 1850 in South Carolina. Following the Civil War, he and his family moved to Nacogdoches, Texas. He graduated from Wiley University in Marshall, Texas.

== Career in Langston ==
In 1891, Wallace and his family migrated to the Oklahoma Territory, settling in Langston, one of Oklahoma's all-black towns. He worked at the Langston Herald and became the city's first licensed attorney, and was Langston's city attorney.

In 1893, he was elected to the second session of the Oklahoma Territorial Legislature. He was the second African American to serve in the body after Green Currin, who was elected in 1891. Wallace and Currin, along with Langston city founder Edward P. McCabe and Republican alternate delegate George Napier Perkins, were described as the only African Americans not "shut out of territorial politics".

== Later life and death ==
Wallace went on to work as a secretary at the Oklahoma Colored Immigration Bureau. In 1903, he moved to Enid, Oklahoma, where he was a school principal. He later moved to Okmulgee, Oklahoma, where he helped found the law firm of Stephens and Wallace.

As an attorney, he led a successful lawsuit in 1920 that led to increase funding for Black schoolchildren in Okmulgee. He died in 1928.

== See also ==
- African American officeholders from the end of the Civil War until before 1900
- List of African-American officeholders (1900–1959)
