= Economic Club of New York =

Nonprofit in New York, US

- Formation: 1907
- Founder: J. W. Beatson
- Purpose: Study and discussion of social, economic and political questions
- Headquarters: New York, NY
- Chair: Dambisa Moyo
- President & CEO: Barbara M. Van Allen
- Website: www.econclubny.org

The Economic Club of New York is a U.S. nonprofit and non-partisan membership organization dedicated to promoting the study and discussion of social, economic and political questions.

== History ==
Founded in 1907, the Economic Club of New York is a forum for discussion on a wide range of issues facing New York City, the United States, and the world. The club welcomes preeminent thought leaders from across the globe and from the public and private sectors to speak on complex issues ranging from public policy and economic regulation to tech disruption. Nonpolitical, nonpartisan, and nonprofit, the Club promotes no agenda and takes no sides on issues, encouraging speakers and members to engage openly in thoughtful discussions.

The Club comprises individual memberships, drawing from senior leadership of the many corporate and financial organizations based in the Metropolitan area. It has hosted speakers who are experts in their respective fields and are driving the conversations that shape the future world. Past speakers include leaders of Fortune Global 500 companies, multiple U.S. presidents, and many other innovators, luminaries, and statesmen.

During the 1910s, the club hosted speakers regarding the hotly debated topic of a U.S. income tax and the movement for women’s suffrage. The 1920s were a time of discussion on post-WWI Europe, free speech, and the role of business as a source of good in the community. During the 1930s, the Club's speakers gave voice to the events in Europe and America’s role in what would become World War II. In the 1940s, the future of Europe’s economy and the continuation of America’s prosperity was debated. The economic impact of the Atomic Age of the 1950s, the societal changes and the space race of the 1960s, the energy crisis of the 1970s were all discussed from the club's dais.

The Club has also had the honor of hosting presidents of the United States, including: Woodrow Wilson, William H. Taft, Herbert Hoover, Dwight D. Eisenhower, John F. Kennedy, Richard Nixon, Ronald Reagan, George H. W. Bush, and Donald Trump as well as International heads of state such as Winston Churchill, Mikhail Gorbachev, Indira Gandhi, Margaret Thatcher, Yitzhak Rabin, Corazon Aquino, and Zhu Rongji.

== Operation ==
The main activity of the Economic Club of New York is to regularly host guest speakers at its member (and their guests)-only dinners and luncheons. However, these presentations are open to the news media to help foster public discussion of issues important to the general public as well those in business and public life. These speaker programs are the focal point of large dinner meetings, or occasionally luncheons, in the ballroom of a major hotel in Manhattan. The format is geared to serious discussion. There is no entertainment, no presentations, and no extraneous business. The focus is on the Guest of Honor and the speaking program. As defined by the Club's founders, the issues for discussion were ones of "live and practical interest" and speakers were to be of national reputation.

== Speakers ==
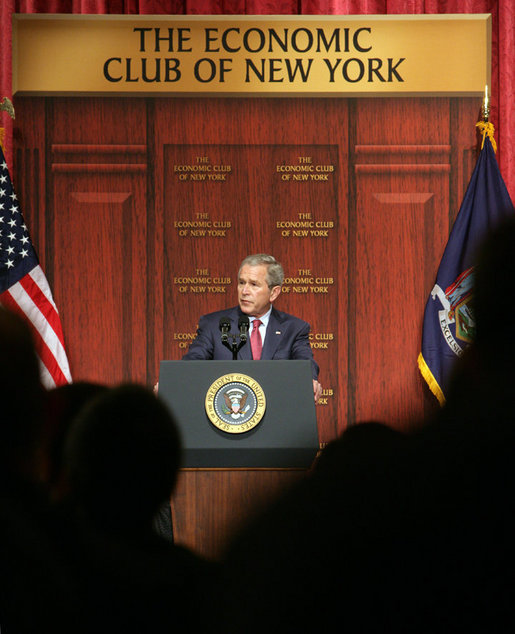
President George W. Bush delivers remarks to the Economic Club of New York in March 2008

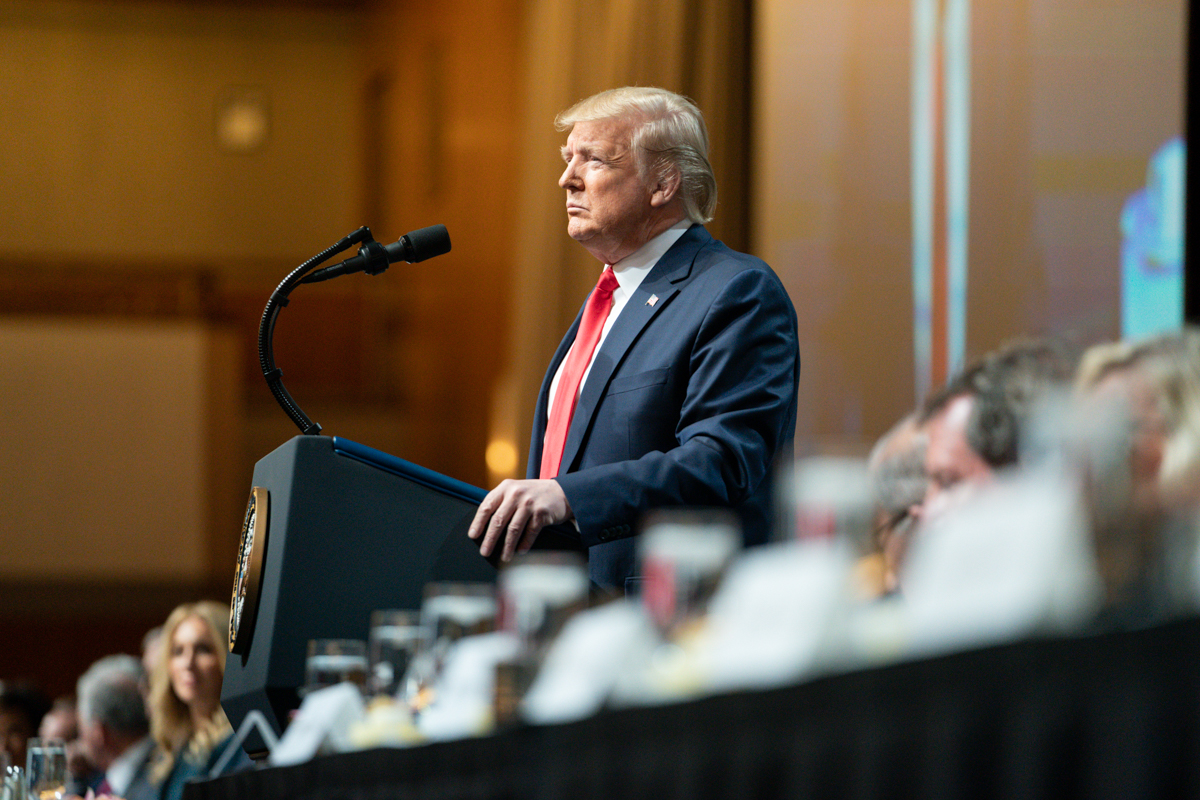
President Donald Trump delivers remarks to the Economic Club of New York in November 2019

The Club has been host to more than 1,200 speakers and the stature, caliber, and variety of speakers has become a guiding principle. The audiences have heard from current, and past presidents of the United States including Woodrow Wilson, William H. Taft, Herbert Hoover, Dwight D. Eisenhower, John F. Kennedy, Richard Nixon, Ronald Reagan, George H. W. Bush, and Donald Trump. Among the many distinguished foreign leaders to address the Club have been Winston Churchill, Mikhail Gorbachev, Indira Gandhi, Margaret Thatcher, Yitzak Rabin, Corizon Aquino, and Zhu Rongji.

Other Guests of Honor have included central bankers, justices of the Supreme Court, secretaries-general of the United Nations, governors and heads of international business enterprises, as well as many key cabinet members, military leaders, ambassadors, and scientists.

Presentations are followed by a questions period in which Club members, selected in advance and seated on the dais, will query the speaker. There are no constraints placed on what speakers may say during their presentation. Questioners are not constrained either.

	Honor Roll of Speakers	
Over the years, the Club has been host to over 1,000 prominent leaders and figures on the national and international stage. A partial listing from their honor roll of speakers follows:
King Abdullah, III	Dag Hammarskjold	George A. Papandreou
Dean Acheson	Phillip Hammond	George Pataki
Giovanni Agnelli	Stephen Harper	Henry M. Paulson Jr.
Corazon C. Aquino	W. Averell Harriman	Peter G. Peterson
Sheila C. Bair	William Randolph Hearst	General (Ret) David H. Petraeus
James A. Baker, III	Felipe Calderon Hinojosa	Harvey L. Pitt
Steve Ballmer	Reid Hoffman	Karl Otto Pohl
Menachem Begin	Herbert C. Hoover	Ruth Porat
Lloyd Bentsen	Charles Evans Hughes	Ian Read
Ben S. Bernanke	Edward L. Hyman	Ronald Reagan
Jeff Bezos	Jeffrey R. Immelt	Donald Regan
Lloyd Blankfein	Robert Kaplan	Walter P. Reuther
Alan S. Blinder	Margaret Keane	Condoleezza Rice
Michael R. Bloomberg	Anthony M. Kennedy	Elliot L. Richardson
Roger Blough	John F. Kennedy	Edward V. Rickenbacker
John A. Boehner	Robert F. Kennedy	David Rockefeller
Clare Boothe	Nikita S. Khrushchev	John D. Rockefeller, III
Erskine Bowles	Mervyn A. King	Nelson Rockefeller
Bill Bradley	Jeanne J. Kirkpatrick	Ginni Rometty
Lael Brainard	Henry Kissinger	Eric S. Rosengren
Louis D. Brandeis	Edward I. Koch	Wilbur L. Ross Jr.
William Jennings Bryan	Lawrence Kudlow	Robert E. Rubin
Zbigniew Brzezinski	Christine Lagarde	David M. Rubenstein
James L. Buckley	Fiorello H. LaGuardia	Dean Rusk
Warren E. Burger	Melvin Laird	Paul Ryan
George H. W. Bush	Arthur Levitt	Anwar Sadat
George W. Bush	Jacob J. Lew	Carlos Salinas de Gortari
Nicholas Murray Butler	Walter Lippman	Paul Sarbanes
Michel Camdessus	Li Keqiang	Antonin Scalia
Fernando Henrique Cardoso	Henry R. Luce	Mary L. Schapiro
Andrew Carnegie	Jack Ma	Eric Schmidt
Mark J. Carney	John Major	Dan Schulman
Robert J. Carr	David Malpass	Brent Scowcroft
Jimmy Carter	Paul Martin	William W. Scranton
Stephen Case	William McChesney Martin Jr.	Yitzhak Shamir
William J. Casey	Larry Merlo	Masaaki Shirakawa
Richard B. Cheney	William G. McAdoo	George Shultz
Brian Chesky	John McCain	Ben Silbermann
Jacques Chirac	William J. McDonough	Adam Silver
Jean Chretien	Doug McMillon	Alan Simpson
Winston Churchill	Robert S. McNamara	Alfred P. Sloan Jr.
Mark Clark	Anastas Mikoyan	Jan Smets
Lucius D. Clay	G. William Miller	John W. Snow
William Colby	Francois Mitterrand	John W. Snyder
John B. Connally	Walter Mondale	Gene B. Sperling
Felipe Calderon	Henry Morgenthau	Herbert Stein
Jay Clayton	Daniel Patrick Moynihan	George M. Steinbrenner
Hillary Clinton	Robert S. Mueller, III	Randall Stephenson
Charlie Cook	Brian Mulroney	Robert S. Strauss
Michael Corbat	Edmund S. Muskie	Lawrence H. Summers
Francesco Cossigna	Richard B. Myers	William H. Taft
Christopher Cox	Satya Nadella	John A. Thain
Mario Cuomo	Richard E. Neal	U Thant
Carlos Salinas de Gortari	B.K. Nehru	Margaret Thatcher
Douglas Dillon	Adam Neumann	Peter Thiel
Jamie Dimon	Enrique Peña Nieto	Craig Thompson
Barry Diller	Richard Nixon	Hans Tietmeyer
Elizabeth Dole	Paul H. O'Neill	Juan T. Trippe
Valdis Dombrovskis	Thomas P. "Tip" O'Neill Jr.	Jean-Claude Trichet
Robert J. Dole	Michael Oxley	Pierre Elliott Trudeau
William H. Donaldson		Justin P.J. Trudeau
Alec Douglas-Home		Donald Trump
Mario Draghi		C. H. Tung
William C. Dudley		Stansfield Turner
Willem F. Duisenberg		Peter V. Uberroth
John Foster Dulles		Paul A. Volcker
Dwight D. Eisenhower		Caspar Weinberger
Ludwig Erhard		Mary Jo White
David Farr		Christine Todd Whitman
Martin S. Feldstein		John C. Williams
Gerald R. Ford		Wendell L. Willkie
Henry H. Fowler		Harold Wilson
Stuart Fraser		Woodrow Wilson
Kenneth C. Frazier		James D. Wolfensohn
J. William Fulbright		Janet L. Yellen
Indira Gandhi		Lee Kuan Yew
Gao Xiqing		Ernesto Zedillo
Timothy F. Geithner		Zhu Rongji
Newt Gingrich		
Rudolph Giuliani		
Arthur J. Goldberg		
Barry Goldwater		
Mikhail Gorbachev		
Roger Goodell		
J. Peter Grace		
Phil Gramm		
Alan Greenspan		

== Chairs ==
The Chairman of the Board is the chief executive officer of the Club and presides at meetings of the Club and the Board, and has general charge of the business and affairs of the Club. The first chairman was A. Barton Hepburn, who served from 1907 to 1909. Hepburn was U.S. Comptroller of the Currency from 1892 to 1893 and later president of the Chase National Bank. Other notable chairmen included: Wendell L. Willkie (1938 to 1940), the Republican Party nominee for president in 1940; radio and television pioneer David Sarnoff (1940-1942); James P. Warburg (1934 to 1936), financial advisor to President Franklin D. Roosevelt; Rand V. Araskog (1987 to 1990), former CEO of ITT Corp.; Edmund T. Pratt Jr. (1979 to 1980), former CEO and President of Pfizer, Inc. for whom the Duke University engineering school is named and Barbara H. Franklin (2003-2007), one of the first women graduates of Harvard Business School. She also served as s United States Secretary of Commerce under President George H. W. Bush. William C. Dudley, President & Chief Executive Officer of the Federal Reserve Bank of New York, served as chair from 2010-2016. Proceeding Dudley, from 2016-2018 was Terry J. Lundgren, retired President and Chairman of Macys, Inc.

The organization is chaired by Baroness Dambisa Moyo, who, in June 2026, succeeded John C. Williams, President and CEO of the Federal Reserve Bank of New York, who, in turn, had succeeded Marie-Josée Kravis, Senior Fellow at the Hudson Institute.

== Presidents ==
The president is the chief operating officer of the Club. The Club has had only six presidents since its founding over a century ago. They are: Robert Erskine Ely; Edwin A. Locke Jr.; Raymond K. Price Jr.; Paul W. Bateman; Jan Hopkins, and the current President, Barbara M. Van Allen.

Barbara Van Allen is the current President and CEO of the Economic Club of New York. Immediately prior to becoming President, she ran her own boutique consulting firm specializing in strategic communications, stakeholder outreach and government affairs. Over the course of her career, she served in senior leadership roles in the non-profit, trade association, corporate and government sectors based in New York, NY, Washington, DC and San Francisco, CA.

While working in Washington, DC she served as senior director of communications and stakeholder relations for an association representing the audit profession (CAQ); as senior vice president of marketing and communications for the Mortgage Bankers Association, and as chief marketing officer for SourceAmerica.

Earlier in her career she served in senior management positions in New York with ITT Corporation and Cushman & Wakefield. She began her career on Capitol Hill where she rose to become senior legislative adviser to former Rep. Beverly B. Byron of Maryland while attending graduate school at night.

Van Allen graduated with honors from the University of North Carolina-Chapel Hill. She holds an MBA in marketing from New York University and a master's degree in legislative affairs from George Washington University. Ms. Van Allen has served on various nonprofit boards and committees in New York City and Washington, DC and currently serves on the Governing Board of the Bishop John T. Walker School for Boys in Anacostia, Washington, DC. She is a member of the YWCA Academy of Women Achievers and is listed in Who's Who in America and Who's Who of American Women. She and her husband Peter C. Van Allen have two children, Caroline K. Van Allen and Peter C. Van Allen Jr.
