= Arthur Daniels =

Arthur Daniels may refer to:

- Arthur Daniels (rugby league) (1922–2001), Welsh rugby league footballer
- Arthur Daniels (footballer) (fl. 1920s–1930s), English footballer
- Arthur N. Daniels (1860–1903), speaker of the Oklahoma Territorial Legislature

== See also ==
- A. G. Daniells (Arthur Grosvenor Daniells, 1858–1935), American Seventh-day Adventist minister and administrator
