= Morrill Hall =

Morrill Hall may refer to (all are buildings named for Justin Smith Morrill):

- Morrill Hall (Cornell University), the building at Cornell University
- Morrill Hall, a campus building located at the University of Illinois at Urbana–Champaign
- Morrill Hall (Iowa State University)
- Morrill Hall (University of Maryland)
- Morrill Hall, an administration building located on the Twin Cities campus of the University of Minnesota
- Morrill Hall (University of Nevada, Reno)
- Morrill Hall, a campus building located at North Dakota State University
- Morrill Hall (Oklahoma State University)
- Morrill Hall, a residence hall located at the University of Tennessee, Knoxville campus
- Morrill Hall (University of Vermont)
- Morrill Hall, a building at Washington State University
- University of Nebraska State Museum, also known as Morrill Hall
