= Lola May Smeltzer Scott =

- Born: Lola May Smeltzer circa. 1870; Frederick, Maryland, United States
- Died: December 28, 1955; Oklahoma City, Oklahoma, United States
- Education: New England Conservatory
- Known for: President of the Oklahoma and Indian Territory Federation of Women's Clubs
- Spouse: Angelo C. Scott (m. 1894)

Lola May Smeltzer Scott (1870 – December 28, 1955) was an American woman active in the women's club movement in Oklahoma. She was married to Angelo C. Scott.

== Biography ==
Lola May Smeltzer Scott was born in 1870 near Frederick, Maryland, to D. B. Smeltzer and Elizabeth Smeltzer. As a child she moved to Iola, Kansas, with her father before spending two years at the New England Conservatory. She married Angelo C. Scott on May 31, 1894, and moved to Oklahoma Territory. Her husband was elected to the Oklahoma Territorial Legislature in 1894. The family settled in Stillwater, Oklahoma, in 1898 after Angelo Scott was appointed president of Oklahoma State University. Lola Scott was active with the women's club movement. In 1901, she was the secretary of the Oklahoma and Indian Territory Federation of Women's Clubs, and from 1904 to 1906 she served as the organization's president. She wrote to the territorial legislature advocating for child welfare and the creation of a juvenile detention center. In 1908, the couple moved to Oklahoma City. Lola Scott died on December 28, 1955 in Oklahoma City.
