= Dambisa Moyo, Baroness Moyo =

Zambian-born economist (born February 1969)

The Right Honourable The Baroness Moyo
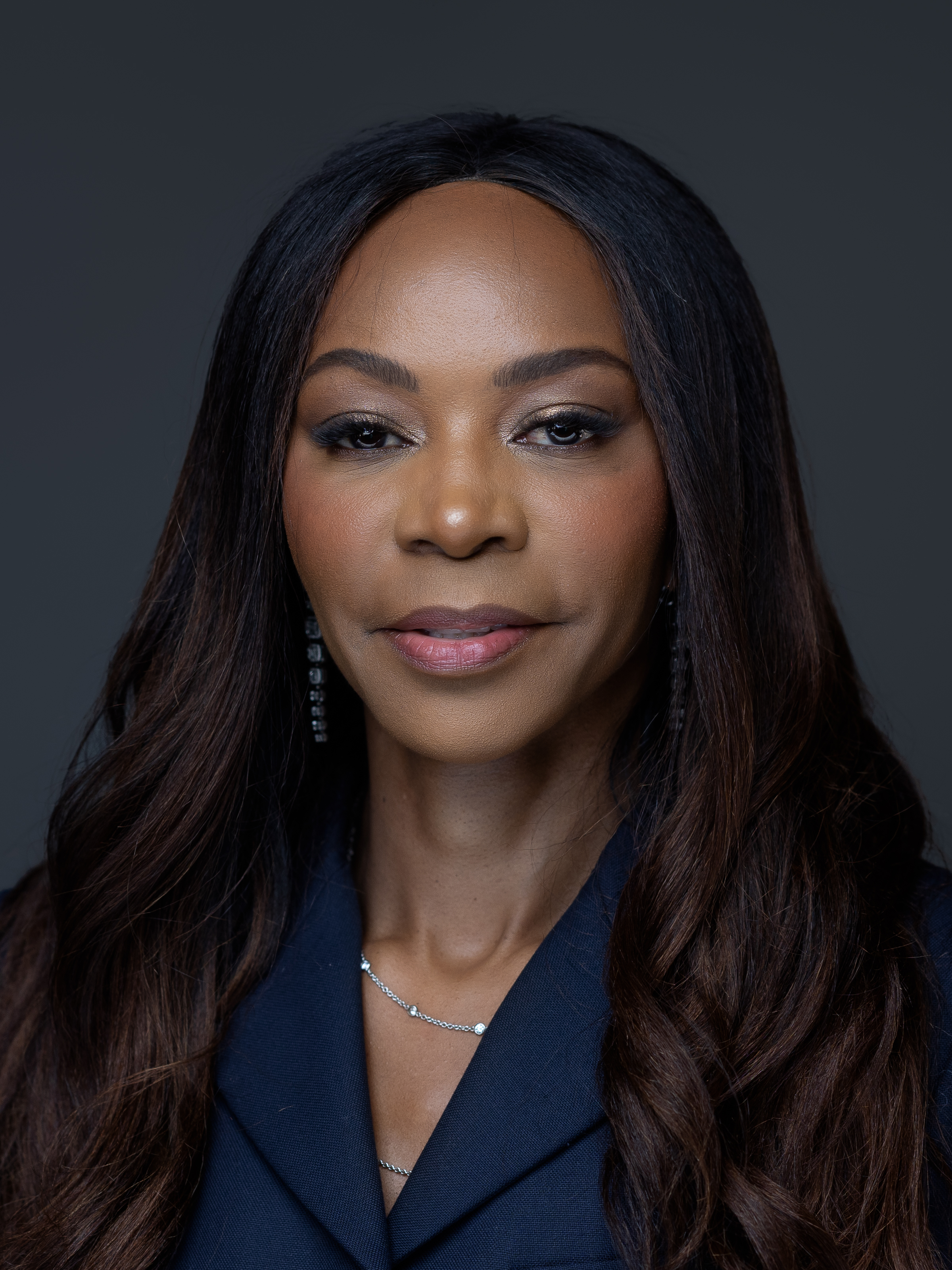
- Moyo in 2024
- Born: Dambisa Felicia Moyo; 2 February 1969 (age 57); Lusaka, Zambia
- Education: University of Zambia; American University (BS, MBA); Harvard University (MPA); St Antony's College, Oxford (DPhil)
- Occupations: Economist; author
- Known for: Economic theories on macroeconomics, global affairs, international development
- Notable work: Dead Aid (2009); How the West Was Lost (2011); Winner Take All (2012); Edge of Chaos (2018); How Boards Work (2021)
- Political party: Non-affiliated (since 2024); Conservative (2022-2024)
- Spouse: Jared Smith

Member of the House of Lords
- Lord Temporal
- Life peerage 8 November 2022

Dambisa Felicia Moyo, Baroness Moyo (born 2 February 1969) is a Zambian-born economist and author, known for her analysis of macroeconomics and global affairs. She has written five books, including four New York Times bestsellers: Dead Aid: Why Aid Is Not Working and How There Is a Better Way for Africa (2009), How the West Was Lost: Fifty Years of Economic Folly – And the Stark Choices that Lie Ahead (2011), Winner Take All: China's Race for Resources and What It Means for the World (2012), Edge of Chaos: Why Democracy Is Failing to Deliver Economic Growth – and How to Fix It (2018), and How Boards Work: And How They Can Work Better in a Chaotic World (2021).

== Early life and education ==
Moyo was born in 1969 in Lusaka, Zambia. She spent some of her childhood in the United States, while her father was pursuing his post graduate education, then returned to Zambia.

She studied chemistry at the University of Zambia, and completed her BS in chemistry in 1991 at American University in Washington, D.C. via a scholarship. She received an MBA in finance from the university in 1993.

She acquired a Master of Public Administration (MPA) degree at Harvard University's John F. Kennedy School of Government in 1997. In 2002 she received a DPhil in economics from St Antony's College, Oxford University, where she was elected an Honorary Fellow in 2026.

== Career ==
=== World Bank and Goldman Sachs ===
Following her MBA, Moyo worked at the World Bank from May 1993 to September 1995. She was a consultant in the bank's Europe, Central Asia and Africa departments, and was one of the 20 contributing authors to the World Bank's 1994 annual World Development Report.

After pursuing her MPA and PhD, Moyo joined Goldman Sachs as a research economist and strategist in 2001. She was with the company until November 2008, working mainly in debt capital markets, hedge funds coverage, and global macroeconomics. Part of her tenure at Goldman Sachs was spent advising developing countries on the issuing of bonds on the international market. She was also head of economic research and strategy for sub-Saharan Africa.

=== Board memberships ===
After leaving Goldman Sachs, Moyo joined the board of directors of the international brewer SABMiller in 2009. She is also a former board member of Barclays Bank, the international mining company Barrick Gold, 3M, and data storage company Seagate Technology.

As of 2025, she is on the boards of directors of National Geographic, Chevron Corporation, Condé Nast. and the Starbucks Corporation.

Moyo is also a former board member of the charities Lundin for Africa and Room to Read.

She is a member of the World Economic Forum's Global Agenda Council on Global Economic Imbalances, The Trilateral Commission, and the Bretton Woods Committee.

In June 2026, Moyo was named Chair of The Economic Club of New York.

=== Journalism and public speaking ===
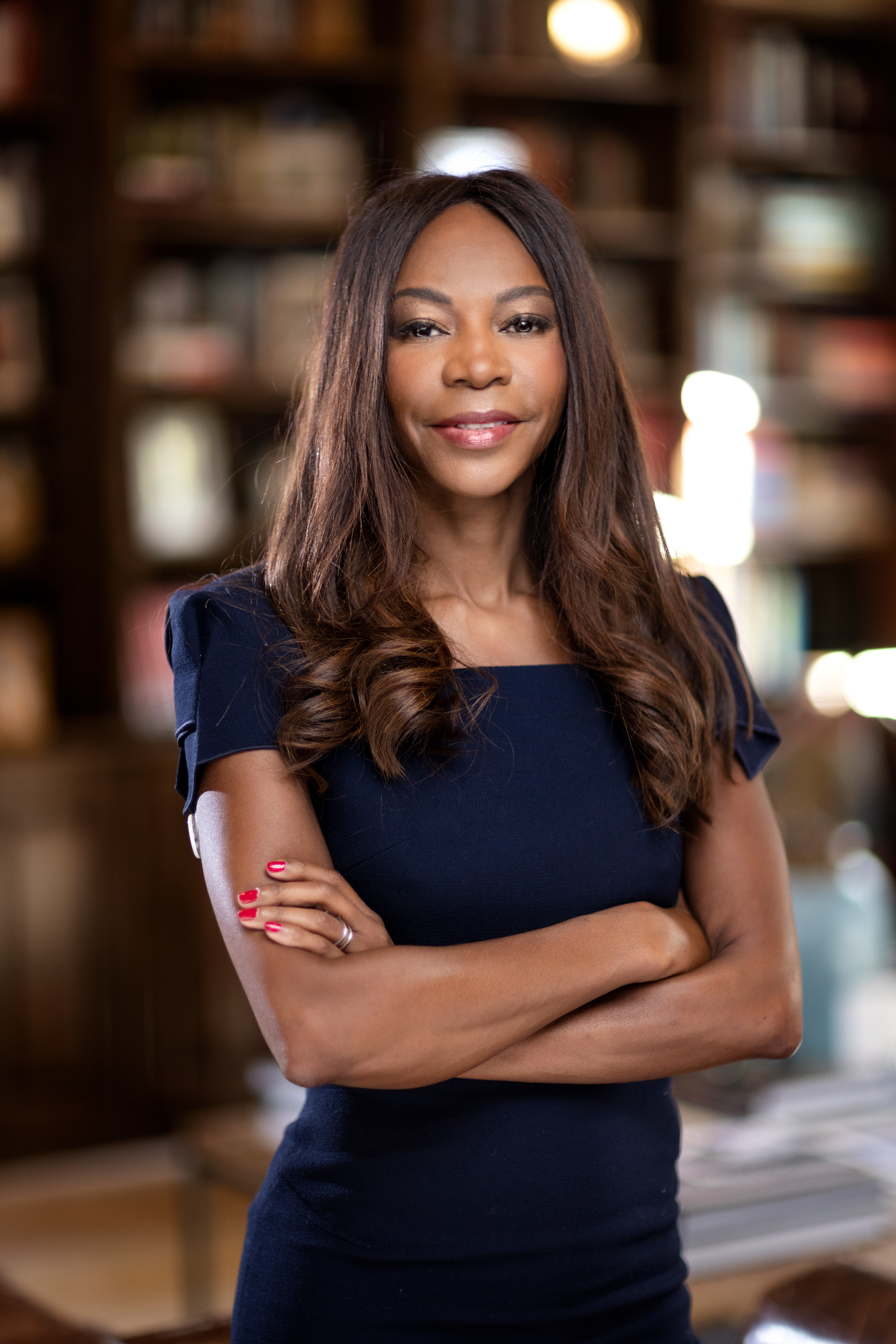
Moyo in 2019.

Moyo is a public speaker, commentator, and columnist. She has written for international financial and economic journals, periodicals, and publications, including The Wall Street Journal, Financial Times, The New York Times, and Time.

She has lectured at financial and economic summits, forums, and conferences, including the annual World Economic Forum conference in Davos, the Council on Foreign Relations, the American Enterprise Institute, the annual Bilderberg Conference, the Peterson Institute for International Economics, the Organisation for Economic Co-operation and Development (OECD), the Aspen Institute, and the Ambrosetti Forum. She also speaks at venues including TEDTalks and BBC's HARDtalk, and is a commentator on business-news television networks.

== Awards and honors ==
On 8 November 2022, she was created Baroness Moyo, of Knightsbridge in the City of Westminster, receiving a life peerage in the 2022 Special Honours. Initially introduced as a Conservative peer, since 2024 she has sat as a non-affiliated peer.

She was also elected to the American Academy of Arts & Sciences in 2022, and as an Honorary Fellow of Queens' College, Cambridge in 2023.

Recognition includes:

- World Economic Forum Young Global Leader (2009)
- Time 100 (2009)
- Oprah Winfrey's O's First-Ever Power List (2009)
- Hayek Lifetime Achievement Award (2013)
- GQ and Editorial Intelligence's The 100 Most Connected Women (2014)
- Handelsblatt's 25 Great Thinkers (2015)
- Evening Standard: London's Most Influential People (2015), (2016), (2017)

== Books ==
=== Dead Aid ===
Moyo's first book, Dead Aid: Why Aid Is Not Working and How There is Another Way for Africa (2009), became a New York Times bestseller. It argues that government-to-government foreign aid has harmed Africa and should be phased out. In the book she states that in the past 50 years, more than $1 trillion in development-related aid has been transferred from rich countries to Africa, and questions whether anything has changed.

The book suggests that official development assistance (ODA), as opposed to humanitarian aid, perpetuates the cycle of poverty and hinders economic growth in Africa. It offers developing countries proposals for financial development instead of relying on foreign government-to-government aid. The Financial Times summarized the book's argument, stating "Limitless development assistance to African governments, [Moyo] argues, has fostered dependency, encouraged corruption and ultimately perpetuated poor governance and poverty." Moyo's solution is to cut poor countries off from aid in five to ten year to force them to instead borrow from international bond markets while touting Chinese foreign direct investment in Africa - an approach many called reckless and harmful.

While a bestseller, the book was poorly received by critics and widely derided in reviews for its poor use of evidence, oversimplification and the repackaging of old ideas previously articulated (such as by Peter Bauer and William Easterly) but without their nuance. The Guardian wrote that the book "is Moyo at her weakest; she is an economist by training and her grasp of the political economy of Africa is lamentable" and called the book "an erratic, breathless sweep through aid history and current policy options for Africa, sprinkled with the odd statistic." In Finance and Development, Clemens wrote that "the book needed a better fact checker and contains numerous unfortunate mistakes" and that it "stumbles as a policy blueprint because it does not come close to offering sufficient evidence that the sweeping changes it recommends in finance mechanisms will greatly improve development outcomes." Paul Collier argued that Moyo, "exaggerates the opportunity for alternative finance and underestimates the difficulties African societies face".

=== How the West Was Lost ===
Moyo's second book, How the West Was Lost: Fifty Years of Economic Folly – And the Stark Choices that Lie Ahead (2011), became a New York Times bestseller, debuting at No. 6.

In a review in The Observer, Paul Collier wrote that "her diagnosis of the recent disasters in financial markets is succinct and sophisticated". The Guardian stated, "How the West Was Lost is more interesting, wider in scale and more important than Dead Aid." It went on to state, "Moyo is a very orthodox thinker, unable to consider a world beyond free markets and underpriced resources and blind to the social effects of what she proposes and celebrates"."

Similarly, Alan Beattie of the Financial Times wrote, "The challenges it identifies are for the most part real, if not original. But the huge flaws of the emerging economies are ignored." The Economist said "these arguments need much better supporting material than the book provides".

=== Winner Take All ===
Moyo's third book, Winner Take All: China's Race for Resources and What It Means for the World (2012), examines global commodity dynamics over the next several decades, specifically China's massive global rush for natural resources including hard commodities (metals and minerals) and soft commodities (timber and food). It predicts the financial and geopolitical implications of a world of diminishing resources, and argues that China is already well on the way to gaining the upper hand in world economic dominance.

Winner Take All became a New York Times bestseller. A review in the Financial Times stated that "If Dambisa Moyo is right, the demands of the world's most populous state are bad news for the rest of us. ... One cannot accuse Moyo of failing to do her homework." The Telegraph commented "Moyo thinks [China's impact on the global commodity market] will go on and on, powered by an unstoppable Chinese economy. Perhaps she is right, but the grounds for doubting whether the future will be a straight line from the past deserve a hearing."

=== Edge of Chaos: Why Democracy Is Failing to Deliver Economic Growth – and How to Fix It ===
In Edge of Chaos, the author crafts an argument that "the global failure to achieve sustained, inclusive growth underpins the rampant political turmoil" increasingly prevalent in the 21st century. Moyo identifies improvements to worker efficiency as key to economic growth, and discusses the need to overhaul democratic capitalism, with potential solutions. The book outlines a 10-point "Blueprint for a New Democracy", designed to encourage the growth of capitalism.

=== How Boards Work: And How They Can Work Better in a Chaotic World ===
Moyo's fifth book, How Boards Work: And How They Can Work Better in a Chaotic World was released in 2021. It provides an insider's perspective of corporate boards, reassesses the three-part board mandate, and calls for more transparent, knowledgeable, and diverse boards to steer companies through 21st-century challenges. The Financial Times stated that the book would be "highly instructive for aspiring non-executives" and provided "thoughtful analysis and reform proposals against which boardroom sophisticates can usefully test their assumptions".

== Personal life ==
In December 2020 Moyo married billionaire Jared Smith, co-founder of Utah-based cloud computing company Qualtrics.

== Bibliography ==
- Dead Aid: Why Aid Is Not Working and How There Is a Better Way for Africa (2009) ISBN 978-0374139568
- How the West Was Lost: Fifty Years of Economic Folly – And the Stark Choices that Lie Ahead (2011) ISBN 978-0374533212
- Winner Take All: China's Race for Resources and What It Means for the World (2012) ISBN 978-0465028283
- Edge of Chaos: Why Democracy Is Failing to Deliver Economic Growth – and How to Fix It (2018) ISBN 978-0465097463
- How Boards Work: And How They Can Work Better in a Chaotic World (2021) ISBN 978-0349128405
