= Edge of Chaos (book) =

2018 economics book

- First edition
- Author: Dambisa Moyo
- Language: English
- Series: 2
- Subject: Economics
- Genre: Non Fiction
- Publisher: Little, Brown (UK); Basic Books (US)
- Publication date: 2018
- Publication place: United States
- Media type: paperback
- Pages: 356
- ISBN: 978-1408710890

The Edge of Chaos is a 2018 non-fiction book by Zambian writer Dambisa Moyo. The writer discusses economies that are on the edge of chaos, requiring economic overhaul to thrive.

== Synopsis ==
In Edge of Chaos, Moyo outlines a societal need to overhaul democratic capitalism in order to insulate from systemic failures that diminish economic growth, and discusses potential solutions. Presented as a 10-point "Blueprint for a New Democracy" designed to encourage the growth of capitalism, Moyo outlines arguments on both sides of her proposals, most of which focus on strengthening democratic functions in the U.S. A compelling argument is made that "the global failure to achieve sustained, inclusive growth underpins the rampant political turmoil" increasingly prevalent in the 21st century.

The author identifies improvements to worker efficiency as key to economic growth, and proposes removing money from political contests, along with suggesting literacy tests for future voters. The book also addresses threats to free-market capitalism, including protectionism, a decrease in global trade, and the short-sighted political myopia of both governments and the public. Moyo argues for policy makers to adopt a wider view, aided by longer terms for elected officials, to facilitate longer-term planning and treaties.

== Reception ==
Edge of Chaos was listed on The New York Times Best Seller list in October 2018, where it appeared for three weeks. It was reviewed in The Wall Street Journal, The New York Times, Bloomberg, and in various other publications.

In May 2018, Human Rights Foundation chairman and Russian chess grandmaster Garry Kasparov lectured on Edge of Chaos with Moyo at the New York Public Library.
