= Angelo C. Scott =

Academic and politician

Angelo Scott

President of Oklahoma State University
- In office 1899–1908
- Preceded by: George E. Morrow
- Succeeded by: John H. Connell

Member of the Oklahoma Territorial Council from the 3rd district
- In office 1894–1897
- Preceded by: J. W. Clevenger
- Succeeded by: H. S. Hanner

United States Commissioner for Oklahoma Territory
- In office 1891–1892

Personal details
- Born: Angelo Cyrus Scott; September 25, 1857 Franklin, Indiana
- Died: February 6, 1949 (aged 91) Oklahoma City, Oklahoma
- Resting place: Highland Cemetery in Iola, Kansas
- Spouse: Lola May Smeltzer Scott (m. 1894)
- Education: University of Kansas; George Washington University

Angelo Cyrus Scott (September 25, 1857 – February 6, 1949) was an American educator, politician, lawyer, and businessman who served as a key leader of Oklahoma Territory and later the state of Oklahoma.

Originally from Indiana and educated in Kansas, Scott migrated to Oklahoma during the Land Rush of 1889. He was an early peace-keeper in the city of Oklahoma City acting as a mediator of land disputes following the chaos of the Land Run. He was the appointed United States Commissioner for Oklahoma Territory by President Benjamin Harrison in 1890 serving in that role until 1892. He was elected to the Oklahoma Territorial Legislature's upper house in 1894 but lost reelection in 1897. While serving in his political roles he also ran a law firm, hotel, and Oklahoma's first newspaper The Oklahoma Times.

He retired from politics after losing reelection and accepted a professorship at the Oklahoma State University, then called Oklahoma A&M. He later served as the university's president between 1899 and 1908. He continued in academia after 1908 serving as a professor at both The University of Oklahoma and Oklahoma City University.

== Early years ==
Scott was born outside of Franklin, Indiana. Shortly after his birth, the family moved to Iola, Kansas. He was educated in Iola both through the public education system and private tutors. He attended the University of Kansas in Lawrence, Kansas where he graduated with a Bachelor of Arts degree in 1877 and a Master of Arts in 1880. He worked as a school teacher for three years and was elected court clerk of Allen County, Kansas. He later moved to Washington, D.C. to attend George Washington University where he earned two law degrees. He returned briefly to Iola to practice law before moving to Oklahoma Territory during the Land Run of 1889.

== Years in Early Oklahoma ==
When Scott arrived in Oklahoma Territory, an ongoing feud with the Boomers, then led by William Couch, and the settlers who followed the rules of the Land Run was reaching a fever pitch. Couch and the Boomers snuck into Oklahoma Territory before the legal date of settlement and divided the land that would become Oklahoma City to fit their vision. This caused disputes between the heavily armed Boomers and the legal settlers of Oklahoma Territory, which started on the evening of April 22, 1889. Scott settled many of these disputes by gathering settlers together for civil discussion as opposed to bloodshed. In one such instance, Scott paid several young boys to run around the town with bells attached to their belts gaining the attention of settlers and leading them toward a town meeting. Thousands of settlers would gather in attendance. The meeting resulted in the creation of a committee, led by Scott. The committee settled land disputes and created outlines for roads and alleys. President Benjamin Harrison officially appointed Scott to a board in charge of settling land disputes in 1890.

After his initial peace keeper days, Scott turned his focus to his law firm, hotel, and the newspaper he founded with his brother, The Oklahoma Times. He also helped organize the Oklahoma City Chamber of Commerce, was a charter member of the First Presbyterian Church, and founded the Oklahoma Institute of Arts and Sciences. In 1893, Governor Abraham J. Seay appointed him as Oklahoma's executive commissioner to the World's Columbian Exposition in Chicago. Scott was elected to the Oklahoma Territorial Legislature's upper house in 1894 subsequently losing reelection in 1897. Scott was known for his progressive thinking in early Oklahoma, one such story recounted Scott stopping a group of white teenagers from abusing a black teenager. Scott soon employed this black teenager as well as other members of his family while serving as a mentor to further his education.

== President of Oklahoma State University ==
Scott first came to Oklahoma State University in 1897 after he was offered an English professorship. He accepted the position of the president of Oklahoma State University only two years after joining the university. He soon realized that the main mission of the university was to fulfill the educational and research needs of the agricultural and engineering industries in Oklahoma. His main contribution to the university was expanding the breadth of studies offered by introducing majors in liberal arts. The campus of the university was expanded greatly during his nearly decade-long tenure which coincided with the faculty doubling. One of these buildings, Morrill Hall, is one of the oldest on campus and still serves as the home of the university's English department. He is also responsible for creating many traditions including writing the university's fight song. He also invested heavily into the athletic program. His wife, Lola May Smeltzer Scott, was a key figure in the university's early history as she established the music department and other social clubs.

== Later Years and Death ==
After leaving Oklahoma State University in 1908, he officially retired from politics just as Oklahoma was officially brought into the Union as a state. He returned to his law practice in Oklahoma City which is where the modern-day headquarters of the petroleum company Continental Resources now stands. Soon after returning to Oklahoma City, Scott accepted a role as the head of the English department at the University of Oklahoma. Before he could assume duties, however, he accepted an offer from Oklahoma City University to serve as the head of the graduate school. He eventually made his way to the University of Oklahoma after leaving Oklahoma City University in 1913 to head OU's extension programs. After serving in that post for ten years, Scott returned to Oklahoma City University to chair the English department until he retired in 1931. Scott lived in a house that he and his wife Lola built on N.W. 16th Street in the illustrious Heritage Hills neighborhood from 1915 until his death in 1949.
