= Point Four Program =

Foreign aid program established by U.S. President Harry Truman in 1949

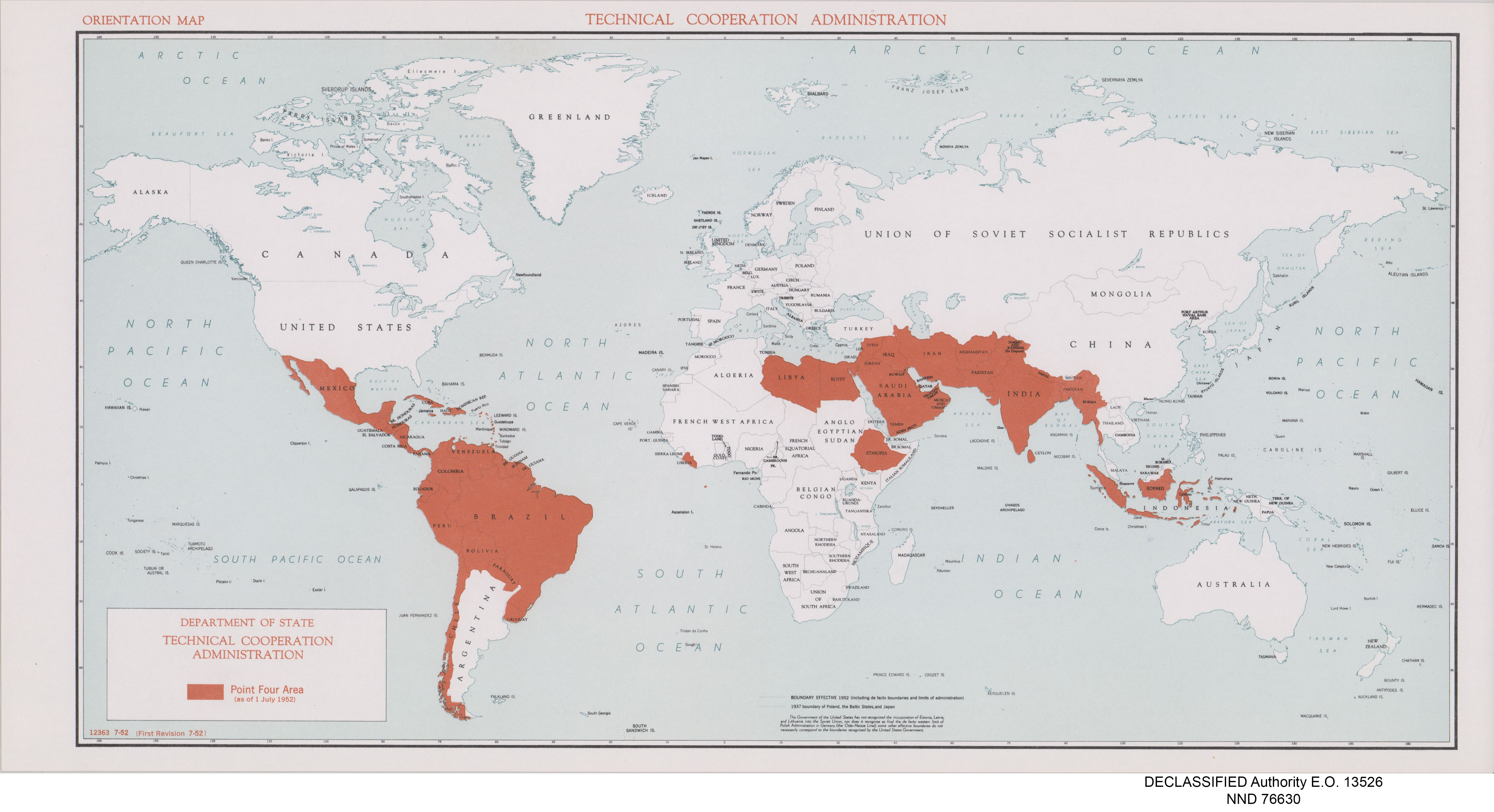
- Countries in the Point Four Program as of 1 July 1952
- Leader: Harry S. Truman
- Chairman: Henry G. Bennett (First Administrator)
- Founder: Harry S. Truman
- Founded: January 20, 1949 (Announced in Inaugural Address)
- Dissolved: August 1, 1953 (Merged into Foreign Operations Administration)
- Headquarters: Washington, D.C., United States
- Ideology: Anti-communism; International development; Technical assistance; Human rights

The Point Four Program was a technical assistance program for "developing countries" announced by United States President Harry S. Truman in his inaugural address on January 20, 1949. It took its name from the fact that it was the fourth foreign policy objective mentioned in the speech.

== Background ==
President Harry S. Truman's first term saw the start of the Cold War, Soviet domination of the Eastern Bloc, and a communist victory in the Chinese Civil War. The United States sought to contain communism and prevent its expansion into the Third World. A significant amount of American aid to Greece and Turkey in 1947 was technical assistance.

Clark Clifford requested aid from the United States Department of State in making Truman's inaugural address "a democratic manifesto". Benjamin Hardy suggested offering technical assistance for economic development to countries; Hardy believed it would create a "democratic campaign to repulse Communism". Under Secretary of State Robert A. Lovett disagreed with the idea, but George Elsey, Clifford's assistant, presented it to Clifford and it was incorporated into Truman's address. On January 20, 1949, Truman detailed four main foreign policy goals in his inaugural address which reiterated support for the United Nations and the Marshall Plan. The fourth point in his list called for the United States to provide scientific and industrial aid to underdeveloped areas. David E. Lilienthal, chair of the Tennessee Valley Authority, viewed the program as "the most potent weapon ever devised, a weapon that makes the atomic bomb seem a firecracker by comparison".

No clear vision for the Point Four Program was established at the time of Truman's address. White House advisors were critical of a State Department report in March 1949 as they had "no idea of what we are actually going to do". On June 24, Truman requested that the United States Congress pass legislation for the program and recommended $45 million for it. A State Department pamphlet in December anticipated a budget of $85.6 million, with half being allocated to agriculture, forestry, health, and education while the remainder would be spent on industrial development, transportation, social services, and public administration.

Truman denied that this was a colonial venture to dominate other countries. Rather, he insisted, "The old imperialism—exploitation for foreign profit—has no place in our plans. What we envisage is a program of development based on the concepts of democratic fair-dealing. All countries, including our own, will greatly benefit from a constructive program for the better use of the world’s human and natural resources."

This was not a call for economic aid—on the order of the Marshall Plan, ⁣⁣but for the US to share its "know-how" and help nations develop with technical assistance. There was bipartisan support, led by Republican Congressman Christian A. Herter of Massachusetts.

Point Four was the first global U.S. foreign aid program, yet it drew some inspiration from the nation's wartime Office of the Coordinator of Inter-American Affairs (OCIAA), which extended technical assistance to Latin American countries. Nelson Rockefeller, the administrator of the OCIAA, strongly supported the establishment of Point Four in congressional hearings.

According to the US Secretary of State Dean Acheson, it was the initiative of the then legal counsel to the president Clark Clifford, who suggested to president Truman to initiate an assistance on a worldwide basis, and to include the issue in his inaugural address. According to Robert Schlesinger's book, White House Ghosts, it was Chief Public Affairs Officer Benjamin H. Hardy who first came up with the concept. After the suggestion was as good as lost in the foggy miasma of the State Department's bureaucracy, Hardy decided to bring the idea to the attention of Truman aide, George Elsey. Elsey and Clifford went on to herald the abstraction into policy. Hardy eventually left the Department of State and became the new Technical Cooperation Administration's Chief Information Officer.

== Implementation ==
John Kee, chair of the United States House Committee on Foreign Affairs, proposed legislation for technical assistance while U.S. Representative Christian Herter proposed legislation to protect American investment. No action was taken on either of these bills and a compromise bill was created as part of the Foreign Economic Assistance Act. Congress allocated $35 million to the technical assistance program in the Title IV of the Foreign Economic Assistance Act, which was signed into law by Truman on June 5, 1950. In September, Congress allocated $26.9 million to the Point Four Program, compared to the $2.25 billion for the Marshall Plan. Truman promoted the program as practical and inexpensive and later promotion material touted that the program cost less than one battleship. Describing the new program, Truman noted that, "Communist propaganda holds that the free nations are incapable of providing a decent standard of living for the millions of people in under-developed areas of the earth. The Point Four program will be one of our principal ways of demonstrating the complete falsity of that charge."

After Congressional approval on October 27, 1950, the Technical Cooperation Administration (TCA) was established within the Department of State to run the Point Four program and the OCIAA became incorporated into the new organization. Henry G. Bennett, the president of Oklahoma State University (OSU) since 1928, was the first TCA administrator from 1950 to 1951. Congress allocated $147.9 million to the TCA in 1952, and $155.6 million in 1953.

Bennett and Hardy died in a plane crash near Tehran in December 1951 while conducting work on the Point Four Program.

The program was carried out with the countries whose governments concluded bilateral agreements with the US government regarding aid under the program, and the TCA established field missions within those countries, which worked to improve agricultural output and distributed technical know-how on improving the economy in general. The first government to do so was the government of Iran, on October 19, 1950.

President Dwight Eisenhower replaced the TCA with the Foreign Operations Administration (FOA) in June 1953, and then into the International Cooperation Administration (ICA) in 1955. Its successor agency is the Agency for International Development.

Syria and Egypt rejected technical assistance from the United States and Gamal Abdel Nasser viewed it as attempted colonialism.

=== University involvement ===
In 1951, Nelson Rockefeller, who worked on American technical assistance programs in Latin America, was asked by Truman to create an advisory board to coordinate the Point Four Program with business, philanthropic, and education leaders. Rockefeller's nineteen member board included seven academics. Harold Stassen, president of the University of Pennsylvania, led the TCA from 1953 to 1955, and promoted university involvement in the program citing OSU's activities in Ethiopia and Michigan State University's activities in Colombia and India.

Around 1,500 technicians worked for the TCA in 1953, and they were present in 35 countries. Around 20% of the technical assistance personnel working abroad by 1953 were from university contracts. There were 80 Point Four contracts with 56 universities by 1958.

John B. Hollister replaced Stassen as head of the ICA and viewed the university contracts as disappointing. He faulted poor organization and the universities failing to provide support for these results. University contracts were terminated under his tenure.

== Contributions ==
The Point Four Program was different from other programs in that it was not confined to any specific region; it was extended to countries such as Pakistan, Israel, and Jordan. The American University of Beirut (AUB) also received funding from the Point Four program to expand its operations.

=== Africa ===
Bennett went to Ethiopia in 1950 to initiate an agreement in which OSU would help Ethiopia set up an agricultural school similar to an American land-grant university.

=== India ===
Among the first nations to gain extensive technical assistance was India. From 1950 to 1951 India saw the implementation of a penicillin plantation, an increase in schools and medical research facilities as well as dam construction. In addition to economic assistance, India also agreed to maintain a democratic government. U.S. Officials hoped this would prevent India forming alliances with the Soviet Union and China.

Home economists were sent by the University of Tennessee to eight Indian colleges and universities to develop curricula and applied research in nutrition. The The Allahabad Agricultural Institute had its education programs modernized by the University of Illinois Urbana-Champaign.

=== Iran ===
Brigham Young University (BYU), University of Utah (UoU), and Utah State University (USU) contributed to the Point Four Program and its continuing programs in Iran. BYU sent advisers to help modernize Iranian education from 1951 to 1955, and 1957 to 1961. Public health advisers were sent by UoU from 1951 to 1956.

== Criticism ==
U.S. Senator Robert A. Taft, an isolationist, opposed the program and viewed it as a "global Works Progress Administration". The Wall Street Journal and Chicago Tribune were critical of the financial cost of the program.

Economist John Kenneth Galbraith questioned if development aid actually reached those who needed it and noted that it was foolish to rely on private investment in unstable regions.

Justice William O. Douglas criticized the program as only shoring up corrupt, reactionary, and feudal systems. India's delegation to the United Nations criticized the program as a means to ship raw materials to industrialized nations.

== Legacy ==
The Point Four Program was the first US plan designed to improve social, economic and political conditions in 'underdeveloped' nations. It marked the promotion of international development policy to the center of the U.S. Foreign Policy framework. The post-war climate and rising threat of communism alongside lack of investment from both congress and American businessmen led to the faltering of the Point Four Program.

== See also ==
- Locke Mission

== Works cited ==
- Garlitz, Richard (2018). Mission for Development: Utah Universities and the Point Four Program in Iran. Utah State University Press. ISBN 9781607327530.
- Paterson, Thomas (1972). "Foreign Aid under Wraps: The Point Four Program". Wisconsin Magazine of History. 56 (2). Wisconsin Historical Society: 119–126. doi:10.2307/4634774. JSTOR 4634774.
