= The Oklahoma Times =

American newspaper (1889-1984)

- Type: Daily newspaper
- Format: Broadsheet
- Owner: Oklahoma Publishing Company (OPUBCO)
- Founded: May 9, 1889
- Ceased publication: 1984

The Oklahoma Times was a newspaper published in Oklahoma City.

== History ==
On May 9, 1889, Angelo C. Scott and his brother Winfield W. Scott published the first issue of The Oklahoma Times. The paper was soon forced to change its name to The Oklahoma Journal due to a conflict with Hamlin W. Sawyer's The Oklahoma City Times. Later, J. J. Burke and E.E. Brown bought the Journal and the Times, merging them to form the Times-Journal. In 1916, the struggling paper was purchased by Edward K. Gaylord's Oklahoma Publishing Company (OPUBCO) and operated under the name The Oklahoma Times as the evening counterpart to OPUBCO's The Daily Oklahoman until 1984, when it was incorporated into The Daily Oklahoman and ceased publication.
