= Thomas P. Braidwood =

Territorial Oklahoma politician

Member of the Oklahoma Territorial Legislature from the 19th district
- In office 1903–1905
- Preceded by: Ret Millard
- Succeeded by: J. P. Gandy

Personal details
- Died: January 3, 1929 (aged 73) Beaver, Oklahoma, United States

Thomas P. Braidwood was an American politician who served in the Oklahoma Territory Legislature from 1903 to 1905.

== Biography ==
Thomas P. Braidwood moved to the Oklahoma Panhandle in 1877, when it was known as No Man's Land. He helped organized Cimarron Territory and served as the unrecognized government's secretary of state and as the provisional mayor of Beaver. In 1903, he was elected to the 7th Oklahoma Territorial Legislature from the 19th district. He died on January 3, 1929, in Beaver.
