= George Gardenhire =

American politician

President Arthur N. Daniels

Member of the Oklahoma Territorial Council representing the 7th district
- In office 1890–1893
- Preceded by: Position established
- Succeeded by: L. G. Pitman

Personal details
- Born: Marion County, Tennessee
- Party: People's Party

George W. Gardenhire (October 4, 1841 – December 19, 1905) was the first president of the Senate in the Oklahoma Territorial Legislature and a member of the Oklahoma's People's Party.

== Early life ==
Born in 1841 in Marion County, Tennessee, Gardenhire moved to Lawrence County, Arkansas with his family when he was 10.

Gardenhire served in the Civil War for several years and returned to Arkansas where he married Rebecca James in 1866. He moved to Cowley County, Kansas in 1869. He moved to Payne County, Oklahoma in 1889.

== Political career ==
Gardenhire is best known for pushing through a compromise bill that set up what would become Oklahoma State University - Stillwater.

Gardenhire was a Populist Party legislator, the only one on the council of the first Oklahoma Territorial Legislature. However, he was elected president, due to the division of the legislature among Republicans and Democrats.

Gardenhire also helped organize the Farmer's Alliance in Kansas during his time there.
