= Morrill Hall (Oklahoma State University) =

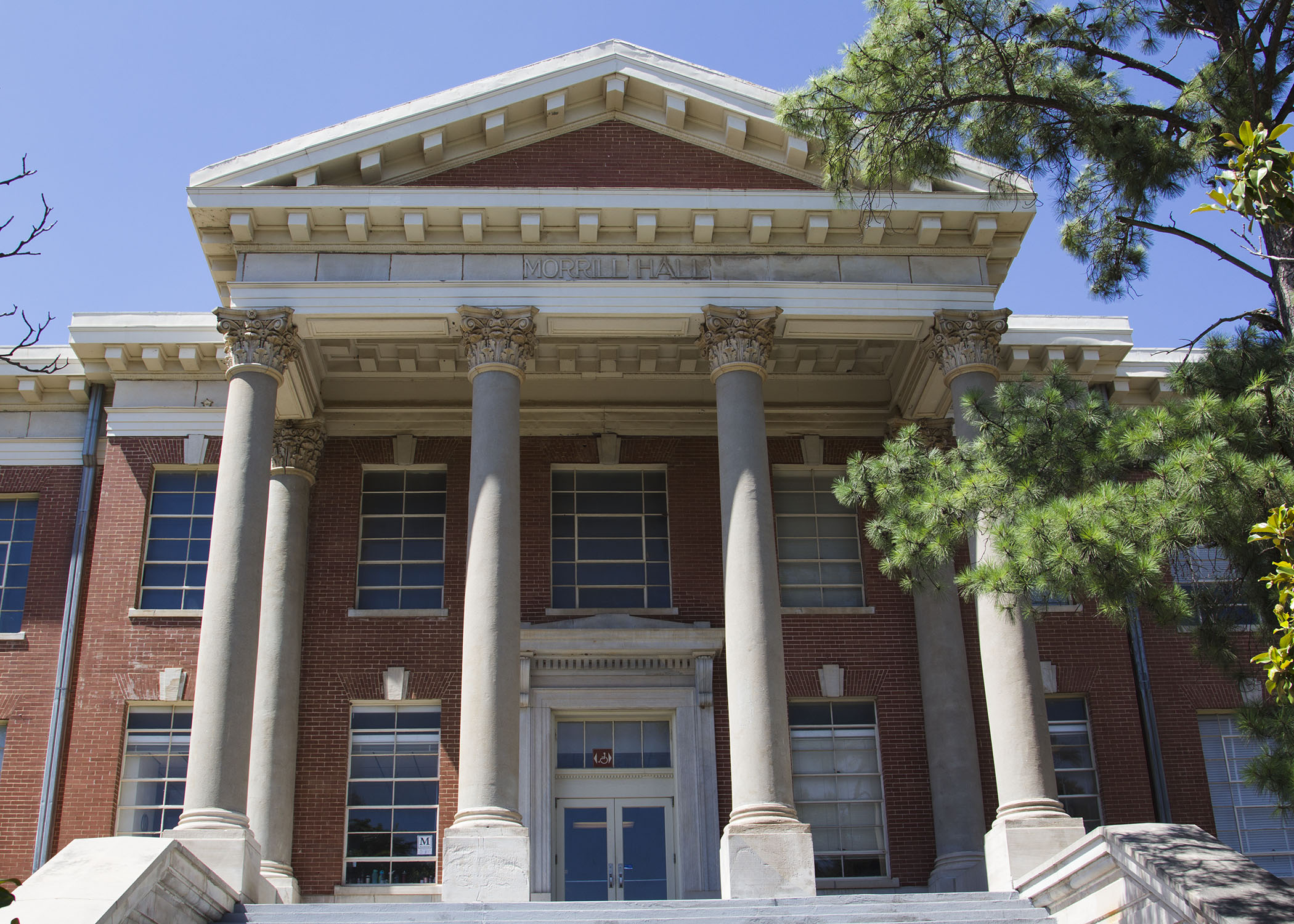
- South side
- Interactive map of Morrill Hall
- Location: Stillwater, Oklahoma
- Coordinates: 36°07′20″N 97°03′59″W
- Owner: Oklahoma State University
- Type: Classroom

Construction
- Opened: 1906
- Renovated: 1915
- Cost: $78,000

Website
- http://english.okstate.edu/

Morrill Hall has been the home of various academic departments at Oklahoma State University. Constructed in 1906, it originally housed the agricultural college, administrative offices and the experiment station. In 1914, it was devastated by fire, but was reconstructed in 1915. Today, it houses the OSU English Department.

== History ==
In 1902, Oklahoma Agricultural and Mechanical College (OAMC) President Angelo C. Scott, who served from 1899 – 1908, proposed the construction of a main building that would house departments in agriculture, administration, and the experiment station. At the time, political maneuvers to keep the capital in Guthrie prohibited any funds from being used for construction of new buildings at a public institution. President Scott traveled to Washington D.C. in January 1905 to acquire a Congressional exception to this new rule. In his discussions, he referred to the new building as Morrill Hall. The homage to Justin Morrill’s Act, which established the land-grant system, influenced members in Congress. U.S. President Theodore Roosevelt signed the Scott-Fields bill on February 16, 1905, to provide funds for the new building at OAMC.

=== Construction ===
President Scott afterwards persuaded Oklahoma assembly members to allocate $100,000 for an agricultural building, engineering building and a gymnasium. Proposals for the construction of Morrill Hall were presented at the board of regents meeting on October 30, 1905. $78,000 of the appropriation monies were to be used for the building. However, further political issues postponed the construction. On January 15, 1906, a ceremony was held to lay the first cornerstone. After nine months of construction, Morrill Hall was completed in mid-October 1906. Consisting of three floors, its original dimensions measured 76 ft. in width and 160 ft. in length. Its stone and brick design, as well as its columns, would become a popular architectural feature with future construction on the OAMC campus.

=== The Fire of 1914 ===
Tragedy struck the seven-year-old building in the early morning of August 7, 1914. At 2 a.m. a fire was reported on the top floor of the building and a fire whistle rang through the night. Efforts were made to save records and items from the lower floors. However, as volunteer firefighters battled the blaze, water pressure was lost and the water supply eventually exhausted due to a dry summer. The fire, unhindered, then progressed to the first floor. After the fire gutted the building, the floors collapsed, leaving only the exterior walls standing. No injuries were reported.

OAMC President Lowry Lewis assured the college that classes would open in September as scheduled. Departments and classes that were displaced by the Morrill Fire were relocated to different locations across campus. Only ten weeks after the Morrill Hall fire, the Women’s Building (now known as the Bartlett Center) caught fire during the annual Harvest Carnival on October 16. Damages on the two buildings amounted to more than $50,000. Morrill Hall was renovated and reconstructed by September 1915. Departments within Morrill returned by the fall of 1915.

While the causes of the fires were undetermined, it was believed to be the result of faulty electrical wiring. The fires were partly responsible for the formation of Boomer Lake and OSU’s fire training program.

=== Throughout the Years ===
By 1919, Morrill Hall was occupied by the college’s administration, agricultural division, the extension service, and several other departments. The administrative and agricultural offices moved into Whitehurst Hall after its opening in the summer of 1926. In 1928, the schools of commerce and education and the departments of foreign languages, physics and correspondence were all located in Morrill. The art department settled into the fourth floor in 1938.

== Present Day ==
Today, Morrill Hall houses the OSU English Department.
