= Bennett Memorial Chapel =

- Interactive map of Bennett Memorial Chapel
- Location: Stillwater, Oklahoma
- Coordinates: 36.12002°N 97.067704°W
- Owner: Oklahoma State University
- Capacity: 125
- Type: Chapel

Construction
- Built: 1954-57
- Opened: December 14, 1957
- Cost: $150,000

The Bennett Memorial Chapel is a building on the campus of Oklahoma State University located in Stillwater, Oklahoma. The interdenominational chapel serves as a memorial to honor students from Oklahoma A&M College (now Oklahoma State University), who were killed during World War I and World War II and to honor Henry G. Bennett, president of Oklahoma A&M College, and his wife Vera, who died in a plane crash in Iran in 1951.

== History ==
The idea of a campus chapel began in 1944 when members of Oklahoma A&M College's (OAMC) Blue Key fraternity wanted to build a chapel to memorialize OAMC students who died during World War II. Fundraising, with a goal of $200,000, began, but was stopped by an influenza outbreak on the campus.

The idea for the chapel would resurface in 1946, and then sporadically came up until November 1948, when the president of Purina Mills, William F. Danforth, said that he would be willing to donate $5,000 towards the construction of an interdenominational chapel if the students could raise the remaining money. Henry G. Bennett, president of the college, approved of the idea, and envisioned a 500-seat chapel with a cost of $500,000, located near the Student Union.

After Bennett's death in 1951, Oklahoma Governor Johnston Murray signed a plan to create a foundation, known as the Henry G. Bennett Memorial Foundation, to receive funds to build a memorial chapel to honor both the Bennetts and the college's war dead. This foundation was the first formal entity on campus to receive funds, endowments, and gifts from donors.

The location for the chapel became available in the fall of 1954 when the old President's house was removed from campus. 1954 also marked the year when there were enough funds available to begin construction on the chapel. Manhattan Construction Company, the same company that built the Student Union, Bennett Hall, the Library, and other campus units, was awarded the contract to build the chapel. Construction moved at a slow pace as the available funds were insufficient to complete the building.

The Henry G. Bennett Memorial Foundation transferred the title of the incomplete chapel to the college in September, 1956. While there was no debt attached to the chapel, it still lacked furnishings, air conditioning, and stained glass windows. The foundation still had $32,500 in uncollected pledges, that, if they were collected, would be turned over to the college to finish the memorial.

On October 23, 1957, OAMC President Oliver S. Willham declared that funds would be borrowed in order to complete the chapel. He held to an earlier promise that no state funds would be used to complete the project.

At 5,440 square feet and with a 125-seat capacity, the Bennett Memorial Chapel was dedicated on December 14, 1957, the same date as Bennett's birth date, and three years after construction began. Former Oklahoma Governor William J. Holloway gave the commemorative address.

== Fundraising ==
Fundraising for the chapel began in 1944 with $400 that had been raised by campus organizations after plans for the chapel were announced. An initial goal of $20,000 was set and a statewide campaign began in November 1944, but a severe influenza outbreak on campus brought fundraising to a halt. After the formation of the Henry G. Bennett Memorial Foundation, the OAMC class of 1952 announced that the chapel would receive their graduation gift. Other campus organizations also gave their receipts to the foundation. Governor Murray also declared April 1952 to be Henry G. Bennett Memorial Month in an effort to raise funds. By 1954, enough funds had been raised to start construction on the chapel, but only $150,000 of the needed $500,000 was available. Fundraising was made more difficult in that the state itself was very young and did not have generations of wealth to donate money to the college. In addition, the college itself was not familiar with raising money from private donors.

In an effort to raise more funds, the Student Senate declared December 14, 1955 as "Bennett Memorial Chapel Day" and hosted various events to raise money. Guided tours were given, and a dance was sponsored by the Veterans' Club to raise money. A 1956 model car was given as a door prize at the dance, and raised between $1,800-$2,000 of the money needed for the stained glass windows, whose cost was estimated at $5,600.

No state funds were used or requested for the chapel's construction. Pledges from the foundation and a $23,000 loan was borrowed to finish the chapel in time for its dedication on December 14, 1957.

== Design ==
The chapel was designed by John Rex Cunningham, a professor of architecture at Oklahoma A&M College, from which he graduated in 1926. Because the Bennetts loved to visit Bruton Parish Church in Williamsburg, Virginia, Cunningham originally envisioned the chapel to resemble the Bruton Parish Church. Two designs were drawn by Cunningham: the first was a modified-Georgian style to match the style of existing campus buildings, and the second was the more contemporary design that was ultimately chosen. Cunningham's watercolors of these two designs can be viewed in the Donald W. Reynolds School of Architecture at Oklahoma State University.
