= Whitehurst Hall =

Administrative building at Oklahoma State University, US

- Whitehurst
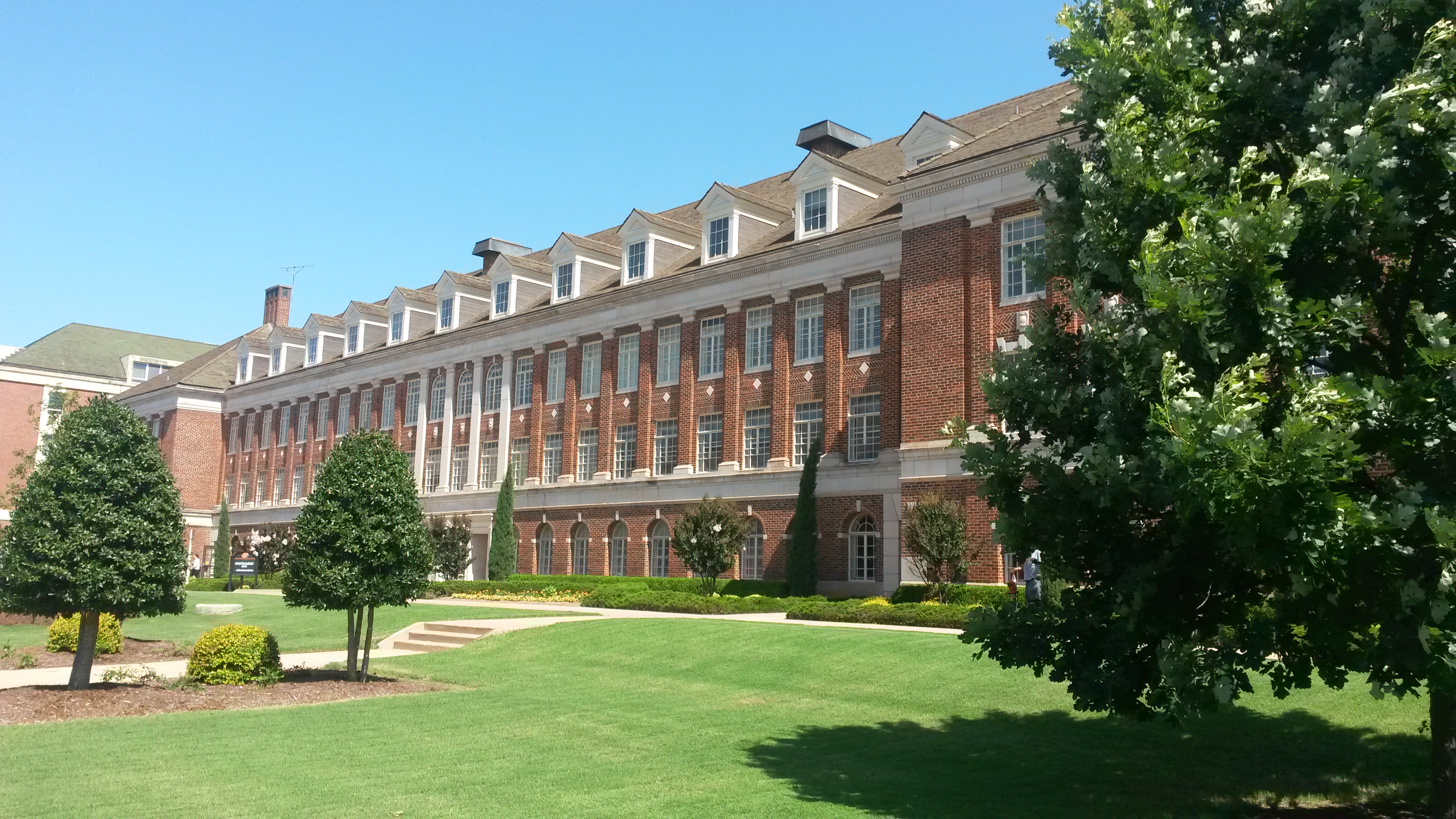
- Whitehurst Hall, Oklahoma State University (2015)
- Interactive map of Whitehurst Hall
- Location: Stillwater, Oklahoma
- Coordinates: 36°07′19″N 97°04′14″W
- Owner: Oklahoma State University
- Type: administrative building

Construction
- Built: 1926

Website
- https://statemagazine.okstate.edu/history_whitehurst

Whitehurst Hall is an administrative building at Oklahoma State University. It was built in 1926 and named after John A. Whitehurst, president of the Oklahoma Board of Agriculture from 1918 to 1926.

== History ==
The building originally housed the office for Oklahoma State University President Henry G. Bennett, his staff, the library, departments of agricultural school and other administrative offices. At the time it was built, it was one of the few structures west of Washington Street, not far from agricultural fields, experimental plots, stockyards, chicken coops and barns. Located near the site of the old brick College Barn. In 1926 the construction of Whitehurst Hall was the largest building project attempted at the college.

=== Construction ===
The groundbreaking for construction of Whitehurst Hall began in September 1925. Scaffolding for the walls and structural work was installed in early November, and the crews began erecting the reinforced concrete and steel structure. Whitehurst stands three stories tall with reinforced concrete floors, a flat roof and brick walls. There were 240 windows and steam lines running from the college power plant about 100 yards east provided heat. The outside dimensions of Whitehurst Hall were 262 by 80 feet, with roughly 17,500 square feet of floor space on each of the facility's three floors. The total area in the building surpassed 52,000 square feet. A basement, used mostly for utility connections and equipment, was located beneath the structure. Three doors were located at the center of the south face, which would be considered the front of the building, and the other entrances were at the northeast and northwest corners of the main building where it attached to the modified wings. Open stairwells from the first to third floors were situated near the doors on the north side of the structure. Total cost of construction reached over $250,000.

=== Renovations ===
Renovations to Whitehurst Hall were made in 1936, including the addition of the fourth floor, after damage to the building occurred and repairs were already necessary. Once additional building renovations were approved following the damage, including the addition of the new fourth floor, the renovation project total reached $75,000 (about $1.25 million in 2013).

=== Significant Event ===
On Friday the 13th, 1936 there was an explosion in a 3½-square-foot tunnel below the 6 inch concrete floor, which ran inside foundation walls and around the building. Natural gas, which leaked into the tunnel system, was ignited after an accidental spark was introduced during routine maintenance for a clogged drain. The first damage estimate was for $5,500 (equivalent to about $91,500 in 2013) to fix floors, replace windows, install new ventilators and gas lines, and repair and replace furniture.

== Present ==
In 2015, Whitehurst Hall is an administrative building, continuing to host the President's office, in addition to other administrative offices.
