= Henry G. Bennett =

American academic (1886-1951)

Assistant Secretary of State
- In office November 1950 – December 22, 1951 (his death)

Personal details
- Born: Henry Garland Bennett; December 14, 1886 Nevada County, Arkansas, U.S.
- Died: December 22, 1951 (aged 65) Tehran, Iran
- Spouse: Vera Pearl Connell (m. January 27, 1913–December 22, 1951)
- Children: 5 children
- Education: Ouachita Baptist College (BA); University of Oklahoma (MA); Columbia University (PhD)
- Profession: Educator, public official

Henry G. Bennett (December 14, 1886 – December 22, 1951) was a prominent educational figure in Oklahoma. He served as the president of both Southeastern Oklahoma State University and Oklahoma State University. He was appointed by President Harry S. Truman as the first director of the Point Four Program, a technical assistance program for developing nations.

== Early life and education ==
Henry Garland Bennett was born in Nevada County, Arkansas on December 14, 1886, to Baptist preacher Thomas Jefferson and Mary Elizabeth Bright Bennett. He had three sisters. Although his family moved to Texas before he was one year old, he returned to Arkadelphia, Arkansas before school age. Bennett attended Ouachita Baptist College and obtained a Bachelor of Arts Degree in 1907.

== Career ==
After earning his bachelor's, he accepted a position at a business college in Texarkana, Arkansas. He eventually quit to become a textbook salesman, and in 1906, he moved to Boswell, Oklahoma to become a teacher. He became a superintendent of Choctaw County in 1909 and a superintendent of Hugo Public schools in 1910.

=== Southeastern Oklahoma State presidency ===
He remained as superintendent of Hugo schools until 1919 when he accepted a presidency offer from Southeastern Oklahoma State University. Under his presidency, the university expanded from a campus with one main building to one with four education buildings, a gymnasium, and a library; enrollment also tripled from 1921 to 1928. Later, while working as a visiting summer professor in Durant, Oklahoma, he met his future-wife Vera Pearl Connell, whom he married on January 27, 1913; they had five children.

=== Oklahoma A&M College presidency ===
Bennett was nominated to serve as president of Oklahoma A&M College (now Oklahoma State University) on June 1, 1928, and served till his death. When he became president, Bennett inherited a small, academically weak school with an enrollment less than four thousand. He launched a "Twenty-five Year Plan" to transform the institution at the start of his presidency, and by 1951, the school had more than $50 million in renovations and enrollment had burgeoned to more than twelve thousand. Later in 1946, Bennet gained approval to open a technical branch at Okmulgee and increased academic programs at the school to include doctoral degrees.

While in office, he continued his education, earning a master's degree from Oklahoma University in 1924 and a PhD from Columbia University in 1928.

== Federal appointment and Point Four Program ==
In November 1950, Bennett was appointed as the first Director of the Point Four Program, a technical assistance program for developing nations. Bennett is generally credited with the creation of the method of using specialists from American colleges and universities to teach people in other countries on how to improve food production, housing, health, and education with available resources. During his time with the program, he travelled to 33 nations, establishing around 105 projects.

The Point Four Program was later subsumed into the newly created U.S. Agency for International Development (USAID).

== Death ==
Bennett died in a plane crash near Tehran, Iran, while serving on an official visit to discuss U.S. technical aid with Iranian officials. His wife was also with him and was killed in the crash. Bennett was returning to a student event at Oklahoma State University. Secretary of State Dean Acheson spoke at a memorial event in Washington D.C for Bennett. He was interred at Highland Cemetery, Durant, Oklahoma. The Bennett Memorial Chapel at Oklahoma State University serves as a memorial to Bennett and his wife, and to the students of Oklahoma A&M College who were killed in World War I and World War II.
