= Locke Mission =

U.S. attempt to create a Near East regional office

The Locke Mission refers to the 1951–1953 attempt by the administration of Harry S Truman to create a regional office for the Near East (encompassing much of the modern day Middle East) in Beirut, Lebanon. This office operated under the guidance of Edwin A. Locke Jr. to coordinate all aspects of United States economic policy toward the region, with a particular focus on U.S. aid. In 1951, this aid was primarily provided to Arab refugees through the United Nations Relief and Works Administration and to specific nations and social classes through the Mutual Security Program and the Technical Cooperation Administration. A variety of factors doomed the mission, the office was quickly closed down, and today the Locke Mission is primarily noteworthy as one of the first examples of a drift from bilateralism toward regionalism in the Near East.

== Origins ==
Immediately after World War II, U.S. policy regarding displaced refugees (both for those created by the war as well as by the formation of Israel) was focused on settlement within existing nations, financial assistance, and general economic development in the region. Toward this end, the Economic Survey Mission was launched in 1949, the UNRWA came to Beirut in 1950, and the Point Four program was created. President Truman soon found that the many organizations in the Near East produced “too many plans and too much talk and not enough action.” This frustration with the bureaucracy served as the catalyst for the Locke Mission, commenced in December 1951.

== Overview ==
From the beginning, Locke used his ambassador status and central office in Beirut as assets in his attempt to steamroll his wishes into policy. In the beginning, this was helped by the generous funding Locke received from Truman. However, the U.S. Point Four team in the region began to feel alienated by Locke's vision of investing in the business class of the region which contradicted the Point Four philosophy which leaned more toward providing grass-roots aid. The failure of Locke and Point Four to work together became more consequential when Locke's plan of a $100 million “Arab Development Plan” was not approved by Congress. Locke returned to the United States on a mission to convince President Truman of the plan's merits, but was sent back to Beirut with a different set of goals.

President Truman told Locke to deemphasize Point Four participation in the Near East while simultaneously increasing the activity of UNWRA in the region. The former was not difficult. This success, however, was offset by the challenges posed by UNWRA with its budget deficit and seeming inability to make headway on the Arab refugee crisis. Locke was forced to investigate UNWRA for corruption, but his investigation revealed none. Locke's frustrations were multiplied by his poor relationship with his American UNWRA counterpart John Blandford. Locke resigned after Blanford negotiated a program with Syria in October 1952 that provided only $30 million in funding. To Locke, this was not enough to make any impact. As Locke confided to President Truman, the “UNRWA… is doing a pretty awful job… No one believes in it anymore, especially in the Near East and least of all the refugees themselves.”

== Significance ==
The failure of the Locke Mission led to decreased willingness in the Truman administration and subsequent Presidencies to proactively engage in the Middle East with regard to economic and refugee affairs. However, the mission was one of the first examples of a policy of regionalism whereby the United States concentrated on developing the entire Near East rather than interacting with specific countries.

Of further significance, U.S.- British relations were improved when the British moved their regional council to Lebanon.

== Sources ==
- Fuchs, J. R. "Oral History Interview With Edwin A. Locke"
- Paul W.T. Kingston, "The 'Ambassador for the Arabs': The Locke Mission and the Unmaking of U.S. Development Diplomacy in the Near East, 1952-1953"
- Peter L. Hahn, "Caught in the Middle East: U.S. Policy Towards the Arab-Israeli Conflict" p. 107-110
- Statement by the President on the Appointment of Gordon R. Clapp as Chairman of an Economic Survey Mission to the Near East.
- Annual Budget Message to the Congress: Fiscal Year 1952
- http://www.trumanlibrary.org/hstpaper/lockeeajr.htm
