= Green Currin =

American politician

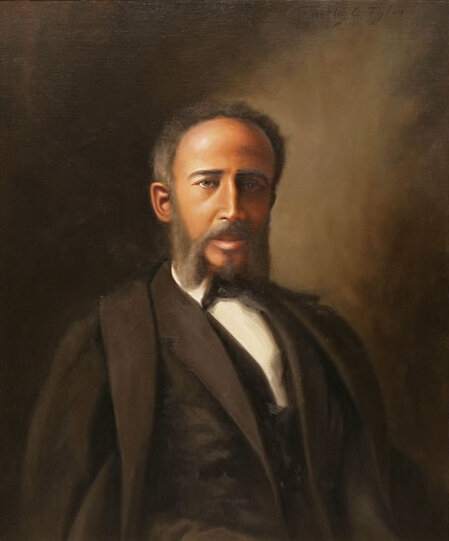

Member of the Oklahoma Territorial House from the 5th district
- In office August 27, 1890 – 1893
- Preceded by: Position established
- Succeeded by: J. P. Lane

Personal details
- Born: 1840s Tennessee
- Died: October 21, 1918 Dover, Oklahoma
- Party: Republican

Green I. Currin (October 20, 1842 or 1844 – October 21, 1918) was the first African American to serve in the Oklahoma Territorial Legislature that existed before statehood in 1907. He was the author of the Oklahoma Territory's first civil rights legislation, a proposal to penalize racial violence, that failed by one vote.

Currin participated in the Land Run of 1889 and served as the Grand Master of the St. John Grand Lodge of Oklahoma, Prince Hall Freemasonry.

== Early life ==
There is conflicting information about Currin's birth, which is listed as October 20, 1842, in Tennessee, in a published obituary and as 1844 in a 1900 U.S. Census for Oklahoma Territory.

After living in Nashville, Tennessee and Kansas, Currin participated in the Land Run of 1889 in Kingfisher County, Oklahoma Territory.

== Political career ==
A Republican, Currin, was one of five delegates elected to the Oklahoma Territorial House of Representatives from Kingfisher County, taking his seat August 27, 1890.

Due to an incident in Kingfisher in which three white men clubbed and injured an African American man, Currin authored House Bill 119, which penalized racial violence. After receiving approval in the Territorial House of Representatives, it failed by one vote in the Territorial Senate.

Currin did not run for re-election after his first term.

== Masonic career ==
Currin, like many African Americans of his time, was involved in African American fraternal orders, serving as the Grand Master of the St. John Grand Lodge of Oklahoma. He was elected in 1901 as the new Grand Master after a schism occurred within Prince Hall freemasonry in Oklahoma with arguments over whether there should be two separate Grand Lodges for the Oklahoma and Indian Territory, as there were national discussions about Indian Territory becoming a separate state. Currin and several others split off and formed a new Grand Lodge of Oklahoma (not including the lodges in Indian Territory) where he became Grand Master.

Not long before his death, a Masonic temple was built in Boley, Oklahoma.

== Later life ==
Currin served as a deputy U.S. marshal and on the board of regents for the Colored Agricultural and Normal College known today as Langston University.

Currin was alive for Oklahoma statehood in 1907 and the election of A. C. Hamlin to the Oklahoma Legislature. He was also alive for the constitutional amendment intended to block potential black voters from registering and the 1915 case, Guinn v. United States, that struck it down. The "grandfather clause" was responsible for an exodus of African Americans from Oklahoma to Canada.

== Death and legacy ==
Currin died at his home in Dover, Oklahoma on October 21, 1918, and was buried in Burns cemetery. In 2007, a portrait dedicated to Currin was unveiled at the Oklahoma State Legislature.

== See also ==
- Oklahoma Territory
- Oklahoma Legislature
- A. C. Hamlin, Oklahoma legislator who was African American
- African American officeholders from the end of the Civil War until before 1900
- List of African-American officeholders (1900–1959)
