= Arthur N. Daniels =

American politician

Speaker Arthur N. Daniels

Member of the Oklahoma Territorial House from the 4th district
- In office 1890–1893 Serving with Demetrius W. Talbot and John H. Wimberly
- Preceded by: Position established
- Succeeded by: O. R. Fegan

Personal details
- Born: Illinois
- Party: Oklahoma People's Party
- Education: Knox College

Arthur N. Daniels (October 31, 1860 – January 1, 1903) was the first House speaker of the Oklahoma Territorial Legislature and a member of the Oklahoma People's Party.

An Illinois native, Daniels arrived in Oklahoma Territory and took part in the Land Run of 1889. He was elected to the First Territorial Legislature of 1890 and chosen by fellow lawmakers to serve as the speaker of the Territorial House of Representatives. As a leader of a coalition of Populists, Democrats, and renegade Republicans, Daniels helped locate what would become Oklahoma State University in Stillwater.

== Early life ==
Daniels was born in Illinois and graduated from Knox College in 1880. He arrived in Oklahoma Territory in 1889, the year of the land run. He owned a homestead in what at the time was Canadian County, but today is Kingfisher County.

== Political career ==
Daniels was able to secure votes for his election to the First Territorial Legislature by promising to make Frisco, Oklahoma the county seat of Canadian County. He joined the Territorial House of Representatives in 1890 and was elected the youngest speaker of the house in the nation. He represented District 4, along with two other legislators.

Daniels was a member of The People's Party, which rose during the Territorial era. Many Populist legislators were simple farmers and Daniels seldom wore socks. There were only four Populists legislators out of 39 in 1890, but they led through a coalition of Populists, Democrats, and renegade Republicans. Daniels and the coalition were responsible for the location of what would become Oklahoma State University in Stillwater.

After his term, he continued to be active as a lobbyist until his death in Guthrie in 1903.
