= Oklahoma Territorial Legislature =

Former legislative branch of Oklahoma

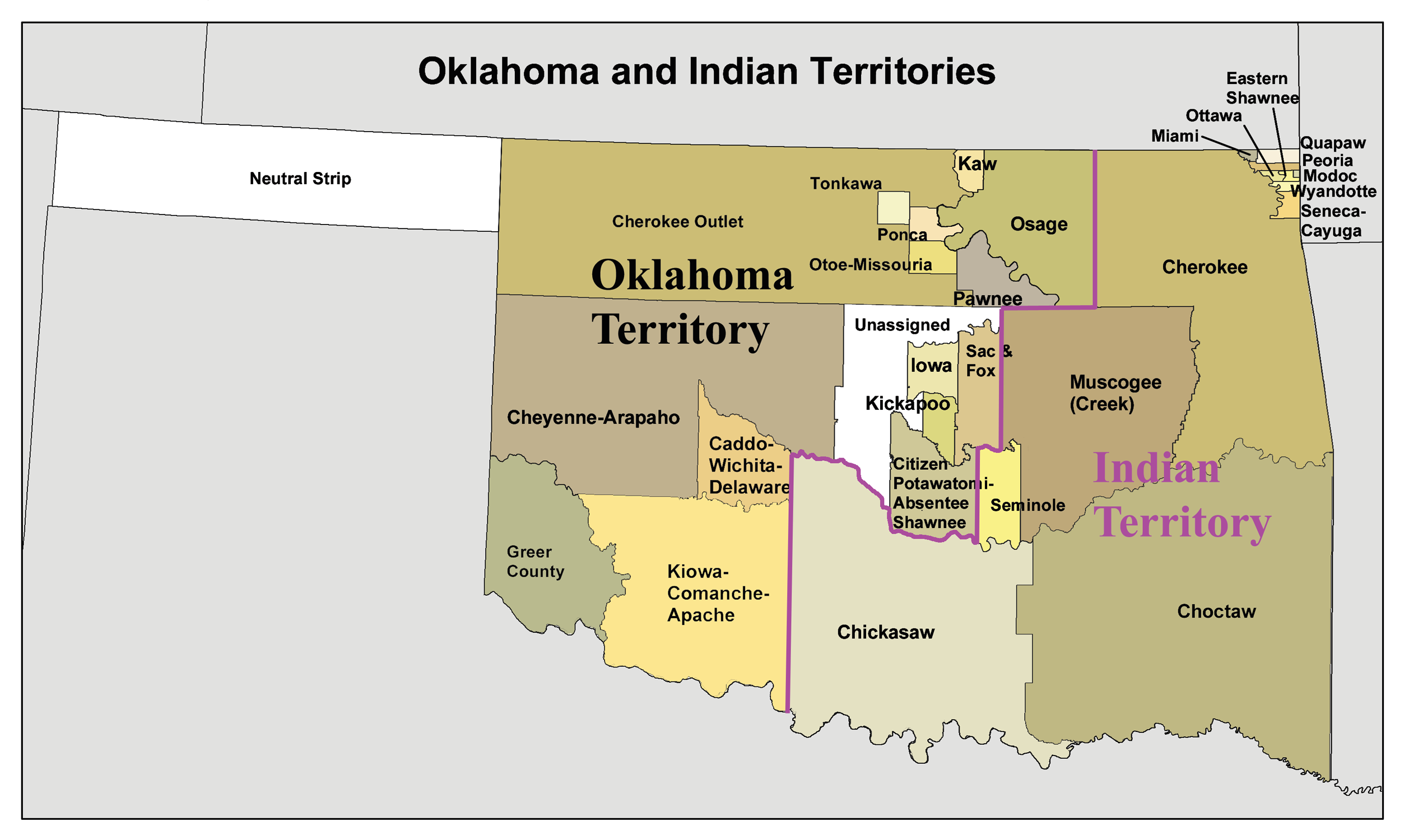

Type
- Type: Bicameral
- Houses: Oklahoma Territorial Council; Oklahoma Territorial House of Representatives
- Term limits: 12 years

Structure
- Authority: Oklahoma Organic Act of 1890

Meeting place
- Guthrie, Oklahoma

The Oklahoma Territorial Legislature was the legislative branch of the government of the Oklahoma Territory. It was organized as a bicameral legislature with a territorial council and a territorial house of representatives. They met for 120-day sessions in Guthrie, Oklahoma.

George W. Steele of Indiana, the first Oklahoma territorial governor, scheduled the election of the first legislature for August 5, 1890. The elected lawmakers met for the first time later that year. The Oklahoma Territorial Legislature met for the last time in 1905.

The territorial legislature was responsible for establishing higher education institutions in the region.

== Politics ==
The People's Party rose during the Territorial era and voters sent several Populist candidates to the legislature. A large majority of Populist legislators were farmers. Populists elected five of 39 territorial legislators in 1890, but led through a coalition of Populists, Democrats, and renegade Republicans. They were responsible for the location of what would become Oklahoma State University in Stillwater. George Gardenhire served as the First Territorial Senate President and Arthur N. Daniels as Territorial House Speaker.

The question of where the capitol would be located was what drove the coalition that wrested power away from Republicans. Generally, the Democrats were in favor of Oklahoma City while the Republicans favored Guthrie, but the two Republicans who joined the coalition of Democrats and Populists were from Oklahoma City. With 14 Democratic lawmakers, five Populists, and two Republicans, the coalition had 21 of the 39 seats. However, a veto by the territorial governor blocked the 1890 effort to relocate the capitol.

Democrats and Populists again gained control of the legislature in 1893, despite a Republican majority in the council and a Democratic defection in the House. Republican W.A. McCartney was elected Council President by Democratic and Populist votes while T.R. Waggoner was elected Speaker of the House when a Republican tired of tied votes and changed sides to move the process along.

Only one Democrat was elected to the 1895 council and voted with the seven Republicans against the five Populists to make J.H. Pitzer the council's president. Republicans also took control of the House, but lost some power due to the Democratic governor's veto. Republicans took control of the legislature only one more time during the territorial era; Populists lost in the election of 1902 and thereafter.

== Actions ==
=== Contributions to Education ===
The Oklahoma Organic Act required that educational institutions be created within the state. Governor George Washington Steele legally approved the creation of University of Oklahoma in Norman, Oklahoma on December 19, 1890, and the Oklahoma Agricultural and Mechanical College in Stillwater, Oklahoma and Oklahoma Normal School for Teachers located in Edmond, Oklahoma on December 25, 1890. In 1897, Colored Agricultural and Normal University in Langston, Oklahoma Normal School for Teachers in Alva, Oklahoma, were created. In 1901, Normal School for Teachers in Weatherford, Oklahoma, and the Oklahoma University Preparatory School in Tonkawa, Oklahoma, were also established.

In 1901, the territorial legislature appropriated funds to establish the University Preparatory School at Tonkawa, Oklahoma.

=== Rights of Women and Minorities ===
The First Territorial Legislature voted to allow each county to opt for either mixed or segregated schools. Ultimately, the 1897 Oklahoma Territorial Legislature banned racial mixing in schools after the 1896 Plessy v. Ferguson decision. The First Territorial Legislature also discussed the right of women to vote.

== Districts ==
The Oklahoma Territorial Legislature began with eight districts in 1890. The first district consisted of County One, present day Logan County, and included Guthrie, Oklahoma. The three members of the Oklahoma Territorial Council and six members of the Oklahoma Territorial House of Representatives came from Logan County in 1890. All nine were Republicans. The second district consisted of Oklahoma County and sent three council members and five representatives to Guthrie in 1890. The fourth district represented Canadian County. The seventh district represented Payne County, Oklahoma.

Membership of the 1890 Oklahoma Territorial Council by district:

1. Charles Brown, John Foster, and John F. Lynn
2. James L. Brown, John W. Howard, and Leander G. Pitman
3. Robert J. Nesbit
4. Joseph Smelser
5. Mort L. Bixler
6. Daniel Harady and W. A. McCartney
7. George Gardenhire
8. Charles F. Grimmer

Membership of the 1890 Oklahoma Territorial House of Representatives by district:

1. Robert J. Barker, William. H. Campbell, Samuel L. Lewis, William H. Merten, William S. Robertson, and James L. Smith
2. Moses Neal, Charles G. Jones, Samuel D. Pack, Daniel W. Perry, and Hugh G. Trosper
3. William C. Adair, James M. Stovall, and Thomas R. Waggoner
4. Arthur N. Daniels, D. W. Talbot, and John H. Wimberly
5. Green J. Currin, D. C. Farnsworth, Joseph C. Post, and Edward C. Tritt
6. Samuel W. Clark, James L. Mathews, and Iran N. Territll
7. Elisha A. Long
8. A. M. Colson
