= List of Kappa Kappa Psi and Tau Beta Sigma national conventions =

1947 convention, held at Oklahoma A&M

Kappa Kappa Psi National Honorary Band Fraternity is an honorary fraternity for college and university band members in the United States. Tau Beta Sigma Honorary Band Sorority is a co-educational recognition and service sorority for college and university band members. Tau Beta Sigma became the sister organization of Kappa Kappa Psi 1947. The two organizations hold joint national conventions every two years in odd-numbered years.

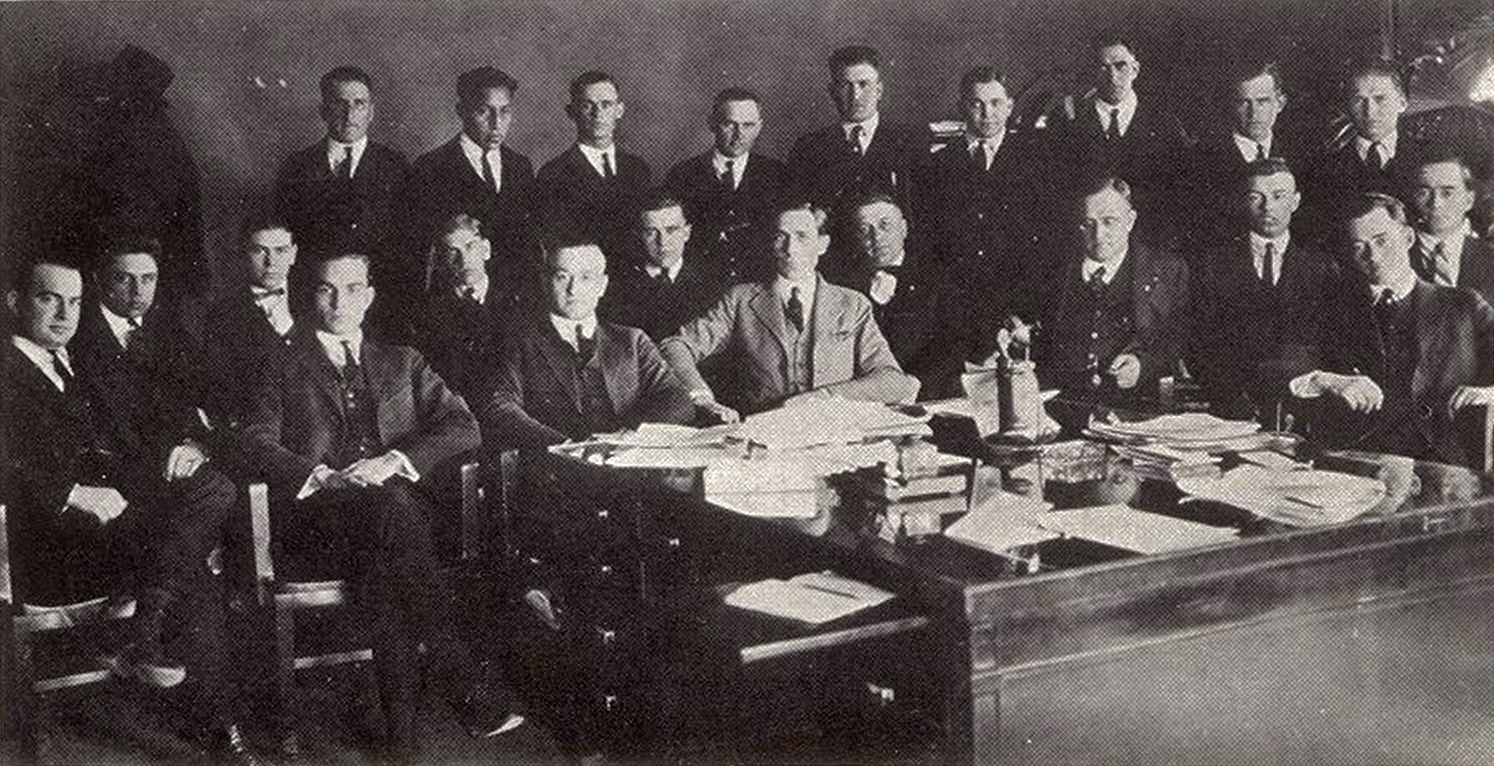
1922 convention, held at Oklahoma A&M

The national convention serves as the governing body of each respective organization. National conventions are called to order in joint sessions, then recessed to allow the two organizations to hold separate business sessions before returning to a final joint session to end the convention. Each organization elects its national officers during the convention. In addition, the conventions features a performance of the National All American Intercollege Band, featuring members of college and university bands from across the United States.

The first national convention of Kappa Kappa Psi was held in 1922, on the campus of Oklahoma A&M College in Stillwater, Oklahoma. The next several conventions were held in Oklahoma City. Beginning in 1939, conventions were held at various college campuses around the country until 1995 when the size of the delegations of Kappa Kappa Psi and Tau Beta Sigma were so large that the organizations were forced to move to convention centers and hotels.

The first national convention of Tau Beta Sigma was held in 1946 on the campus of Texas Tech University, home of the Beta chapter. Since that first convention, each national convention of Tau Beta Sigma has been held concurrently with Kappa Kappa Psi national conventions.

== Kappa Kappa Psi national conventions ==
Following is a list of the national conventions of Kappa Kappa Psi.

Convention number	Dates	Location	References
1	Jan 2, 1922	Oklahoma A&M College (Stillwater, Oklahoma)	
2	December 30, 1923 – December 31, 1923	Huckins Hotel (Oklahoma City, Oklahoma)	
3	June 14, 1926 – June 16, 1926	Huckins Hotel (Oklahoma City, Oklahoma)	
4	December 30, 1927	Huckins Hotel (Oklahoma City, Oklahoma)	
5	December 30, 1929 – December 31, 1929	Huckins Hotel (Oklahoma City, Oklahoma)	
	1931	Not held	
6	July 15, 1932 – July 16, 1932	Huckins Hotel (Oklahoma City, Oklahoma)	
7	July 6, 1935 – July 8, 1935	Claypoole Hotel (Indianapolis, Indiana)	
8	July 27, 1937 – July 28, 1937	Cosmopolitan Hotel (Denver, Colorado)	
9	August 1939	Gibson Hotel and University of Cincinnati (Cincinnati, Ohio)	
10	August 26, 1941 – August 28, 1941	Oregon State University (Corvallis, Oregon)	
	1943	Not held (World War II)	
	1945	Not held (World War II)	
11	March 6, 1947 – March 8, 1947	Oklahoma A&M College (Stillwater, Oklahoma)	
12	August 19, 1949 – August 22, 1949	University of Colorado (Boulder, Colorado)	
13	July 26, 1951 – July 29, 1951	Indiana University (Bloomington, Indiana)	
14	June 25, 1953 – June 28, 1953	Texas Tech University (Lubbock, Texas)	
15	August 4, 1955 – August 7, 1955	Ohio State University (Columbus, Ohio)	
16	August 20, 1957 – August 24, 1957	University of Utah (Salt Lake City, Utah)	
17	August 19, 1959 – August 22, 1959	Florida State University (Tallahassee, Florida)	
18	August 23, 1961 – August 24, 1961	Wichita State University (Wichita, Kansas)	
19	August 28, 1963 – August 31, 1963	University of Arizona (Tucson, Arizona)	
20	August 10, 1965 – August 14, 1965	Indiana University (Bloomington, Indiana)	
21	August 27, 1967 – September 1, 1967	Texas Christian University (Fort Worth, Texas)	
22	August 17, 1969 – August 22, 1969	Oklahoma State University (Stillwater, Oklahoma)	
23	August 22, 1971 – August 27, 1971	University of Michigan (Ann Arbor, Michigan)	
24	August 5, 1973 – August 11, 1973	University of Connecticut (Storrs, Connecticut)	
25	August 4, 1975 – August 6, 1975	University of Houston (Houston, Texas)	
26	August 6, 1977 – August 13, 1977	University of California, Los Angeles (Los Angeles, California)	
27	August 8, 1979 – August 11, 1979	Georgia Institute of Technology (Atlanta, Georgia)	
28	1981	University of Cincinnati (Cincinnati, Ohio)	
29	July 31, 1983 – August 6, 1983	Texas Tech University (Lubbock, Texas)	
30	July 27, 1985 – August 3, 1985	University of Kansas (Lawrence, Kansas)	
31	July 31, 1987	University of Michigan (Ann Arbor, Michigan)	
32	1989	Oklahoma State University (Stillwater, Oklahoma)	
33	July 31, 1991	University of Maryland (College Park, Maryland)	
34	August 1, 1993 – August 8, 1993	Purdue University (West Lafayette, Indiana)	
35	August 1, 1995 – August 5, 1995	Hilton Walt Disney World (Orlando, Florida)	
36	July 29, 1997	Camelback Inn (Scottsdale, Arizona)	
37	July 28, 1999 – August 1, 1999	Renaissance Hotel (St. Louis, Missouri)	
38	July 24, 2001 – July 29, 2001	Omni Bayfront Hotel (Corpus Christi, Texas)	
39	July 22, 2003 – July 26, 2003	Norfolk Waterside Marriott (Norfolk, Virginia)	
40	July 26, 2005 – July 31, 2005	Lexington Center (Lexington, Kentucky)	
41	July 24, 2007 – July 29, 2007	Wyndham Hotel and Resort (Orlando, Florida)	
42	July 21, 2009 – July 26, 2009	Arizona Biltmore Hotel (Phoenix, Arizona)	
43	July 19, 2011 – July 24, 2011	Crowne Plaza Hotel (Colorado Springs, Colorado)	
44	July 23, 2013 – July 28, 2013	Marriott Springfield (Springfield, Massachusetts)	
45	July 28, 2015 – August 2, 2015	Hyatt Regency Lexington (Lexington, Kentucky)	
46	July 18, 2017 – July 22, 2017	Hilton Orlando Lake Buena Vista (Orlando, Florida)	
47	July 16, 2019 – July 20, 2019	Oklahoma State University–Stillwater (Stillwater, Oklahoma)	
48	July 13, 2021 – July 16, 2021	Amway Grand Plaza Hotel (Grand Rapids, Michigan)	
49	July 11, 2023 – July 14, 2023	Caribe Royal Resort (Orlando, Florida)	
50	July 15, 2025 – July 18, 2025	Central Bank Center (Lexington, Kentucky)	

== Tau Beta Sigma conventions ==
Following is a list of the national conventions of Tau Beta Sigma.

Convention number	Dates	Location	References
1	May 4, 1946	Texas Tech University	
2	March 6, 1947 – March 8, 1947	Oklahoma A&M College (Stillwater, Oklahoma)	
3	August 19, 1949 – August 22, 1949	University of Colorado (Boulder, Colorado)	
4	July 26, 1951 – July 29, 1951	Indiana University (Bloomington, Indiana)	
5	June 25, 1953 – June 28, 1953	Texas Tech University (Lubbock, Texas)	
6	August 4, 1955 – August 7, 1955	Ohio State University (Columbus, Ohio)	
7	August 20, 1957 – August 24, 1957	University of Utah (Salt Lake City, Utah)	
8	August 19, 1959 – August 22, 1959	Florida State University (Tallahassee, Florida)	
9	August 23, 1961 – August 24, 1961	Wichita State University (Wichita, Kansas)	
10	August 28, 1963 – August 31, 1963	University of Arizona (Tucson, Arizona)	
11	August 10, 1965 – August 14, 1965	Indiana University (Bloomington, Indiana)	
12	August 27, 1967 – September 1, 1967	Texas Christian University (Fort Worth, Texas)	
13	August 17, 1969 – August 22, 1969	Oklahoma State University (Stillwater, Oklahoma)	
14	August 22, 1971 – August 27, 1971	University of Michigan (Ann Arbor, Michigan)	
15	August 5, 1973–August 11, 1973	University of Connecticut (Storrs, Connecticut)	
16	August 4, 1975 – August 6, 1975	University of Houston (Houston, Texas)	
17	August 1977	University of California, Los Angeles (Los Angeles, California)	
18	August 8, 1979 – August 11, 1979	Georgia Institute of Technology (Atlanta, Georgia)	
19	1981	University of Cincinnati (Cincinnati, Ohio)	
20	July 31, 1983 – August 6, 1983	Texas Tech University (Lubbock, Texas)	
21	July 27, 1985–August 3, 1985	University of Kansas (Lawrence, Kansas)	
22	July 31, 1987	University of Michigan (Ann Arbor, Michigan)	
23	1989	Oklahoma State University (Stillwater, Oklahoma)	
24	July 31, 1991	University of Maryland (College Park, Maryland)	
25	August 1, 1993 – August 8, 1993	Purdue University (West Lafayette, Indiana)	
26	August 1, 1995 – August 5, 1995	Hilton Walt Disney World (Orlando, Florida)	
27	July 29, 1997	Camelback Inn (Scottsdale, Arizona)	
28	July 28, 1999 – August 1, 1999	Renaissance Hotel (St. Louis, Missouri)	
29	July 24, 2001 – July 29, 2001	Omni Bayfront Hotel (Corpus Christi, Texas)	
30	July 22, 2003 – July 26, 2003	Norfolk Waterside Marriott (Norfolk, Virginia)	
31	July 26, 2005 – July 31, 2005	Lexington Center (Lexington, Kentucky)	
32	July 24, 2007 – July 29, 2007	Wyndham Hotel and Resort (Orlando, Florida)	
33	July 21, 2009 – July 26, 2009	Arizona Biltmore Hotel (Phoenix, Arizona)	
34	July 19, 2011 – July 24, 2011	Crowne Plaza Hotel (Colorado Springs, Colorado)	
35	July 23, 2013 – July 28, 2013	Marriott Springfield (Springfield, Massachusetts)	
36	July 28, 2015 – August 2, 2015	Hyatt Regency Lexington (Lexington, Kentucky)	
37	July 18, 2017 – July 22, 2017	Hilton Orlando Lake Buena Vista (Orlando, Florida)	
38	July 16, 2019 – July 20, 2019	Oklahoma State University- Stillwater (Stillwater, Oklahoma)	
39	July 13, 2021 – July 16, 2021	Amway Grand Plaza Hotel (Grand Rapids, Michigan)	
40	July 11, 2023 – July 14, 2023	Caribe Royal Resort (Orlando, Florida)	
41	July 15, 2025 – July 18, 2025	Central Bank Center (Lexington, Kentucky)	
