= Selph Building =

- U.S. National Register of Historic Places
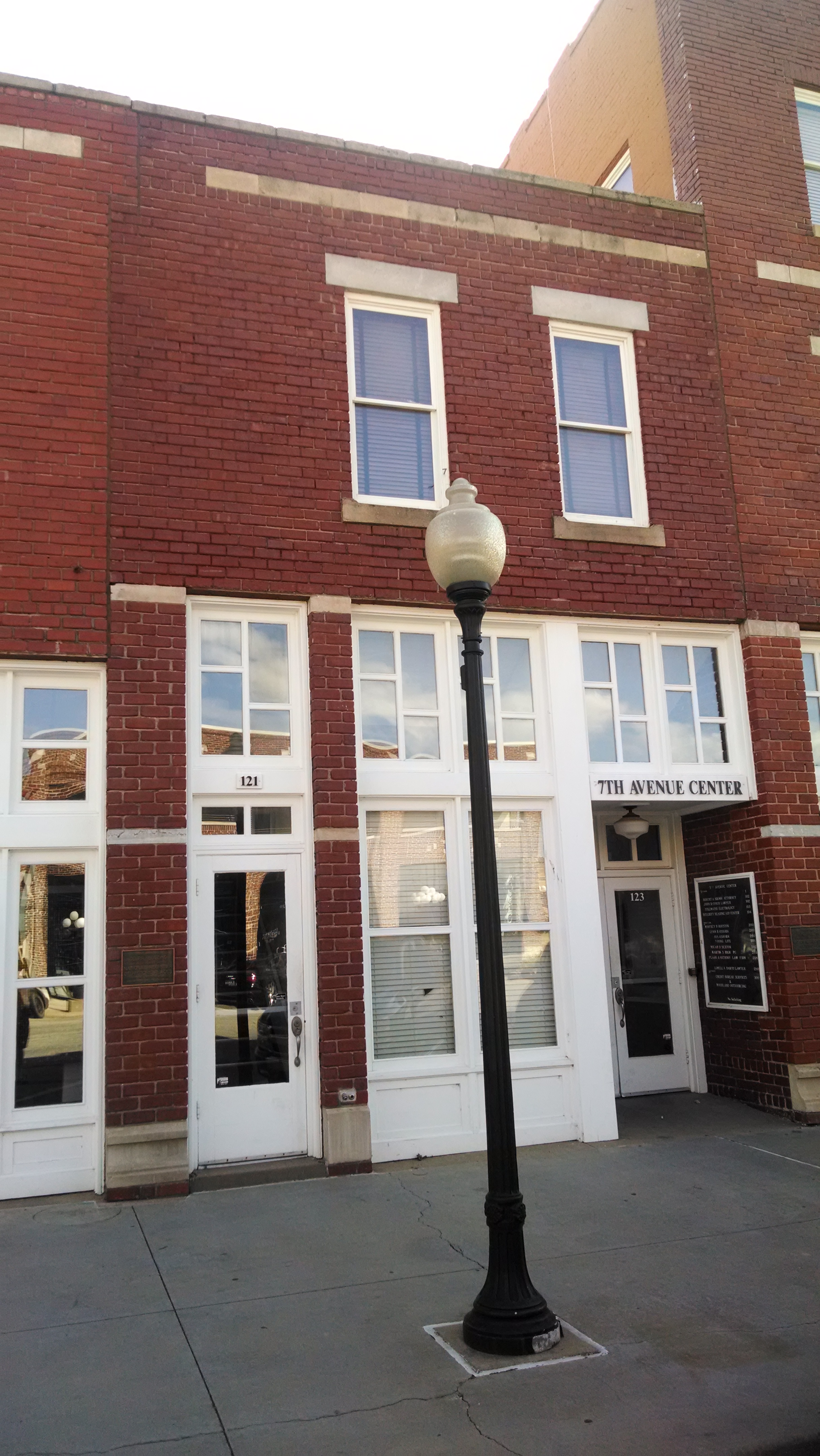
- Selph Building

- Location within Oklahoma Location within the United States
- Location: 119 W. 7th Ave., Stillwater, Oklahoma
- Coordinates: 36°6′51″N 97°3′34″W
- Area: less than one acre
- Built: 1913
- NRHP reference No.: 83002119
- Added to NRHP: September 12, 1983

The Selph Building is one of the first commercial buildings to be built in the downtown area of Stillwater, Oklahoma.

== Description and history ==
The structure was built in 1913, and was originally designed to house a physician's office on its second floor. The first floor was used for various commercial enterprises including a shoe repair shop and cafe. The Selph was one of the first buildings to provide for a public restroom.

The Selph is an 18-foot storefront, 85 ft (26 m) deep on the first floor, with a second floor 30 ft (9.1 m) deep. The building is of red brick with limestone trim. On the south facade there is a brick outhouse. Other nearby historic buildings include the Santa Fe Depot, the Citizens Bank Building, the Hoke Building, the Walker Building, and the Courthouse.

The building was added to the National Register of Historic Places on September 12, 1983.
