= Hoke Building =

Hoke Building may refer to the following places:

- Hoke Building (Hutchinson, Kansas), listed on the National Register of Historic Places
- Hoke Building (Stillwater, Oklahoma), listed on the National Register of Historic Places
