= Citizens Bank Building (Stillwater, Oklahoma) =

- U.S. National Register of Historic Places
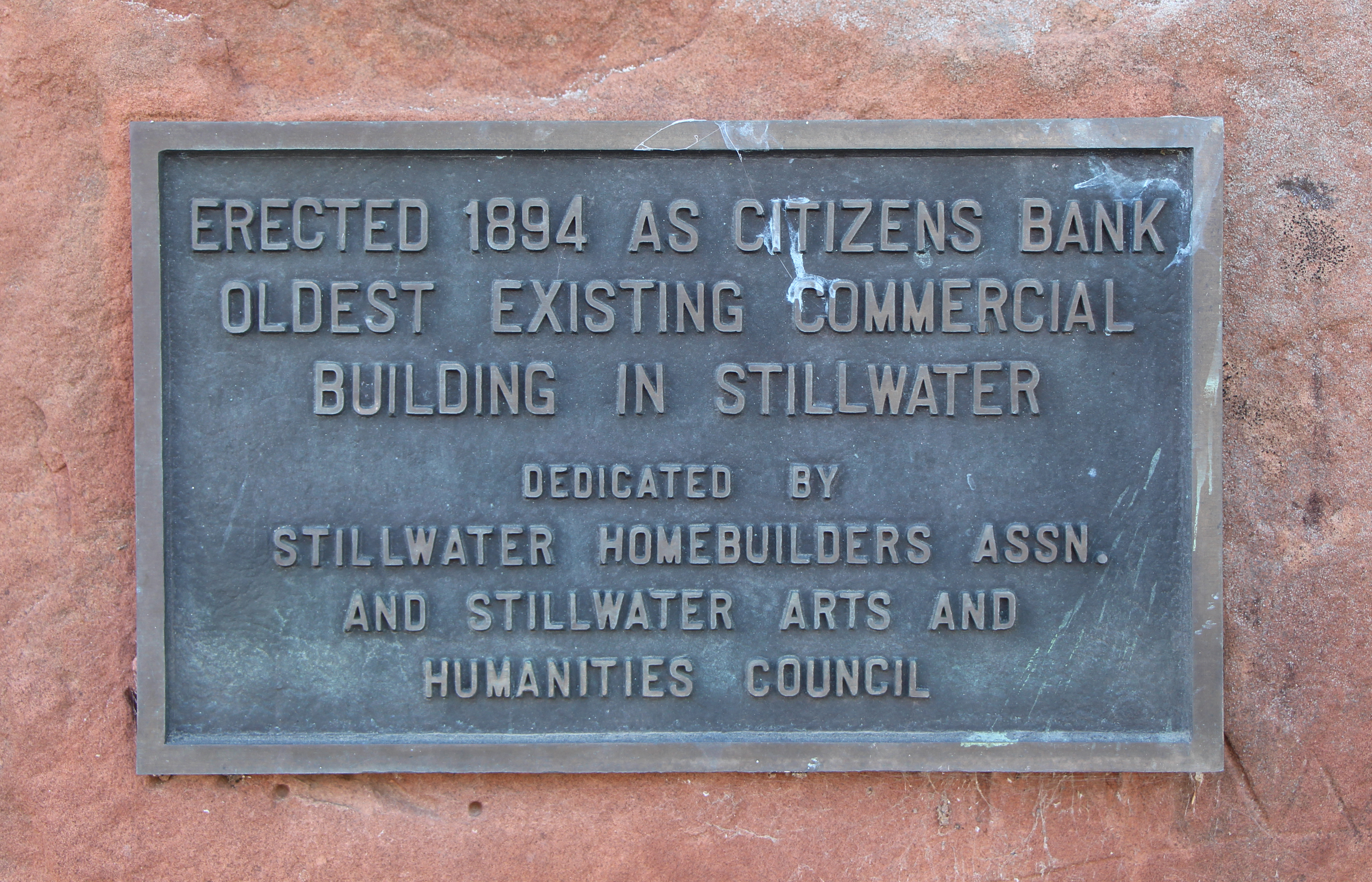
- Citizens Bank Building

- Location within Oklahoma Location within the United States
- Location: Payne County, Oklahoma
- Nearest city: Stillwater, Oklahoma
- Coordinates: 36°6′46″N 97°3′29″W
- Area: less than one acre
- Built: 1894
- Architectural style: Romanesque
- NRHP reference No.: 81000467
- Added to NRHP: February 24, 1981

Citizens Bank is one of the original buildings in the downtown area (the Santa Fe Depot; the Hoke Building, the Selph Building, the Walker Building, the Courthouse) of Stillwater and only one of two buildings in the town with this early architectural style of the Nineteenth Century.

It was constructed in 1894. Citizens Bank moved out in 1900, and a series of businesses have occupied the space to the present. These have included a harness and bridle shop (which later sold automobile tops), a barber shop with Stillwater's first beauty shop, a cafe, a justice of the peace who at various times ran a pawn shop, real estate office, insurance business, a feed store, bakery, clothing store and saloon. From 1936 to 1978 the building served as a shoe repair shop.

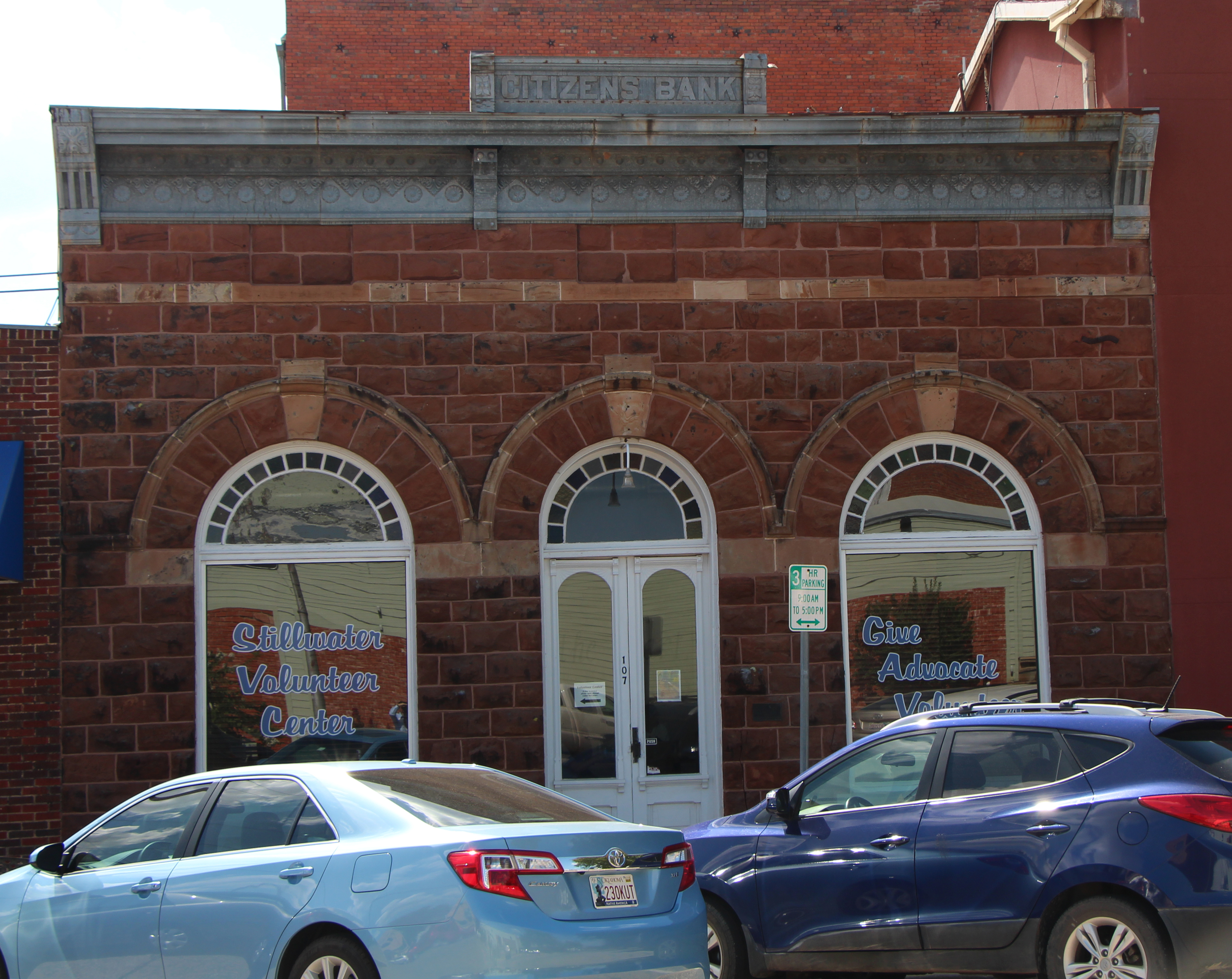
Citizens Bank Building, front

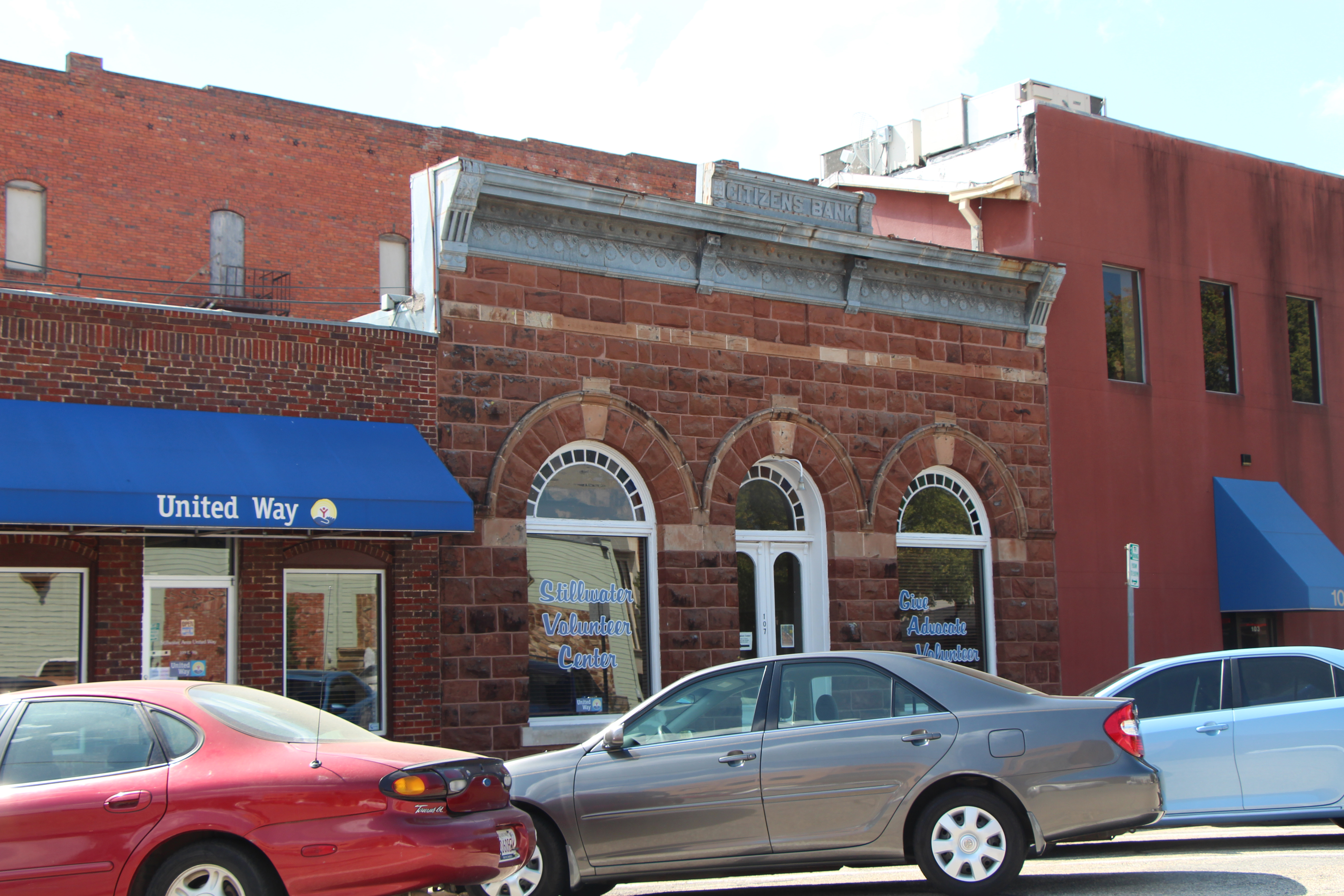
Citizens Bank Building, east side
