= Walker Building (Stillwater, Oklahoma) =

- U.S. National Register of Historic Places
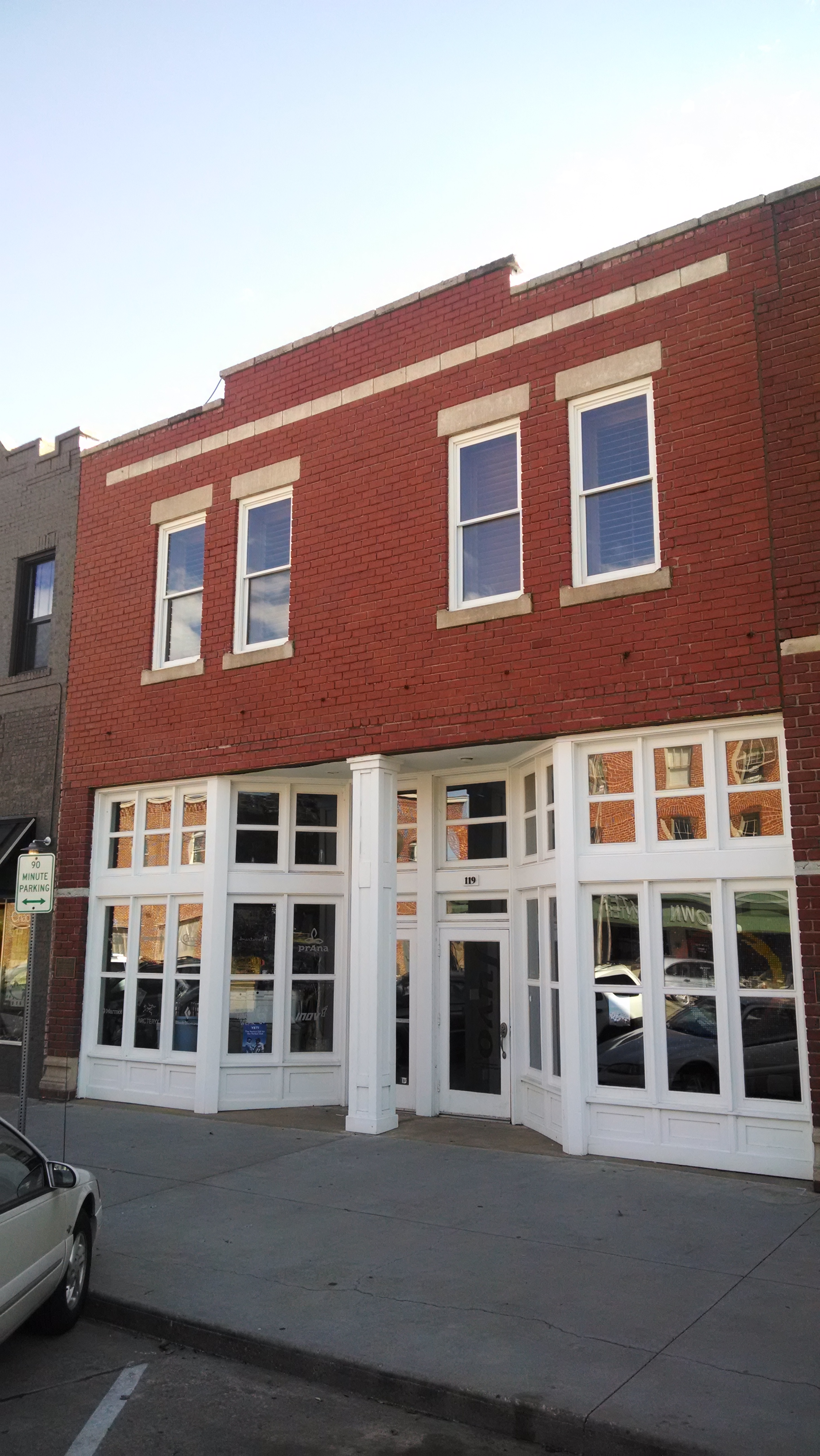
- Location: 117 W. 7th Ave., Stillwater, Oklahoma, Payne County, Oklahoma
- Coordinates: 36°6′51″N 97°3′33″W
- Area: less than one acre
- Built: 1914
- NRHP reference No.: 83002120
- Added to NRHP: September 12, 1983

The Walker Building is one of the original buildings in the downtown area (others are the Santa Fe Depot; the Hoke Building, the Selph Building, the Citizens Bank Building, the Courthouse) in Stillwater. Built in 1914, it is a two-story red brick, 32 feet wide. The ground floor is 88 feet deep with a 10-foot passageway in the rear covered by a loft and a second story which is 100 feet deep.

The Walker was originally a grocery, active for about 30 years.
