= Wava Banes Henry =

American teacher and sorority founder

- Born: Wava Banes; March 14, 1920; Cleveland, Oklahoma, US
- Died: October 16, 2012 (aged 92); Grand Junction, Colorado, US
- Education: Texas Tech College
- Occupation: Teacher
- Known for: Founding Tau Beta Sigma

Wava Banes Henry (March 14, 1920 – October 16, 2012), also known as Wava Banes and Wava Turner, was an American teacher and the founder of Tau Beta Sigma, National Honorary Band Sorority.

== Biography ==
Wava Banes was born on March 14, 1920, in Cleveland, Oklahoma. Her parents were Disa (née Reser) and Harry Banes. In 1937, she began her studies at Texas Tech College, where she graduated with a degree in band music. During her time at Texas Tech, she was one of the first female members in the band, and the first female to graduate with a master's degree in music. Additionally, she was motivated by a desire for women to have the same opportunities as men, and founded the Tau Beta Sigma Club in 1939. In 1946, the club became Tau Beta Sigma, National Honorary Band Sorority.

In 1941 she graduated from college and married her first husband, Jack Turner, who was a member of the Alpha Omicron chapter of Kappa Kappa Psi. Following her graduation, she also taught band in the state of Texas. Following her husband's death in March 1958, she returned to school to receive certification in counseling and mathematics. Eventually, she moved to Aspen, Colorado, in 1961, where she taught in the school system.

While teaching she ceased to be involved with the activities of Tau Beta Sigma, although she attended the 1971 National Convention, and continued to attend conventions until her death.

On March 1, 1981 she married Reese Henry in Aspen, Colorado, adopting the name Wava Banes Henry. On October 16, 2012, she died of natural causes in Grand Junction, Colorado, and was survived by her husband and her daughter Sandra Turner.
