= Hoke Building (Stillwater, Oklahoma) =

- U.S. National Register of Historic Places
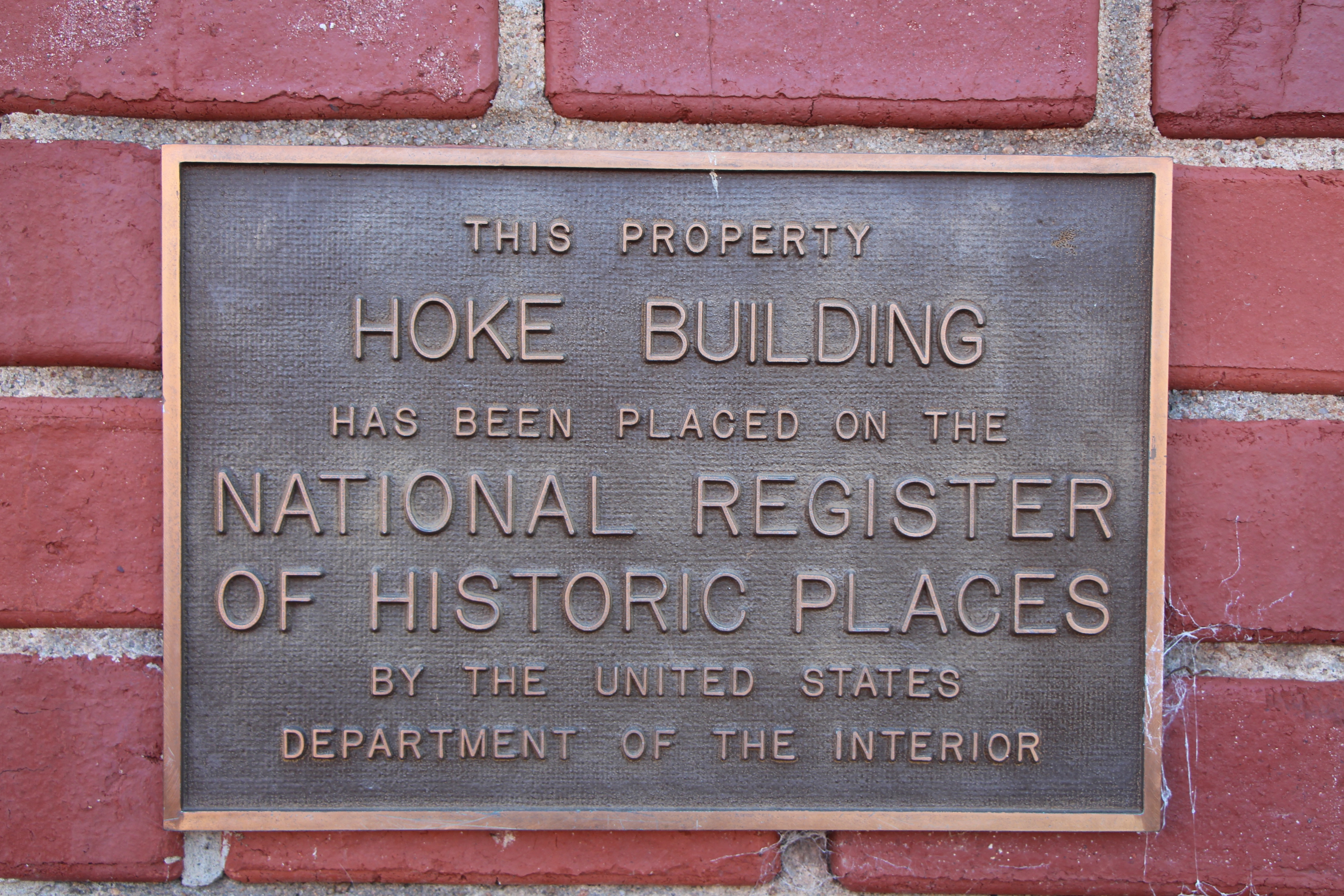

- Location within Oklahoma Location within the United States
- Location: Payne County, Oklahoma
- Nearest city: Stillwater, Oklahoma
- Coordinates: 36°6′51″N 97°3′34″W
- Built: 1915
- NRHP reference No.: 83002118
- Added to NRHP: November March 3, 1980

The Hoke Building is one of the original commercial buildings in the downtown area of Stillwater (the Santa Fe Depot; the Citizens Bank Building, the Selph Building, the Walker Building, the Courthouse). It provided easy access to the Courthouse, and has housed attorneys, judges, dentists, insurance companies, and an abstract company. Space was provided to students at Oklahoma State University for dances and other activities.

The original structure was two stories in height, measuring 40 feet x 90 feet. In 1922 a third floor and a second-floor addition were made, adding 10 feet to its depth. The building is made of brick, and has limestone lintels and window sills.
