= List of Tau Beta Sigma chapters =

Tau Beta Sigma is a co-educational recognition and service sorority for collegiate band members. It was founded at the Texas Technological College (now Texas Tech University) as a recognitions society for women band members in 1946.

== Districts ==
District map of Tau Beta Sigma: North Central District Northeast District Midwest District Southeast District Southwest District Western District

Tau Beta Sigma organizes its chapters and colonies into seven districts, six of which are named for the geographical region of the United States that they represent. The U.S. districts include:

- North Central District: Indiana, Illinois, Kentucky, Michigan, Ohio, and Wisconsin
- Northeast District: Connecticut, Delaware, District of Columbia, Maine, Maryland, Massachusetts, New Hampshire, New Jersey, New York, Pennsylvania, Rhode Island, Vermont, Virginia, and West Virginia
- Midwest District: Colorado, Iowa, Kansas, Minnesota, Missouri, Montana, Nebraska, North Dakota, South Dakota, and Wyoming
- Southeast District: Alabama, Florida, Georgia, Mississippi, North Carolina, South Carolina, and Tennessee
- Southwest District: Arkansas, Louisiana, New Mexico, Oklahoma, and Texas
- Western District: Alaska, Arizona, California, Hawaii, Idaho, Nevada, Oregon, Utah, and Washington

The seventh district is a de jure "International District" which would contain any chapter located outside of the United States, but there are no international chapters. Each chapter is automatically a member of the district in which its state is located, unless it appeals to the National Council to join a neighboring district.

== Chapters ==
Following is a list of Tau Beta Sigma chapters, with active chapters indicated in bold and inactive chapters are in italics.

Number	Chapter	Charter date and range	Institution	Location	District	Status	Ref.
1	**Alpha**	March 26, 1946	Oklahoma State University	Stillwater, Oklahoma	Southwest	Active	
2	**Beta**	May 4, 1946	Texas Tech University	Lubbock, Texas	Southwest	Active	
3	Gamma	October 27, 1946	University of Colorado Boulder	Boulder, Colorado	Midwest	Inactive	
4	**Delta**	April 28, 1946	University of Oklahoma	Norman, Oklahoma	Southwest	Active	
5	**Epsilon**	July 7, 1946 – 19xx ?; April 2, 1977	Butler University	Indianapolis, Indiana	North Central	Active	
6	Zeta	May 24, 1947	Stetson University	DeLand, Florida	Southeast	Inactive	
7	Eta	May 19, 1947	Phillips University	Enid, Oklahoma	Southwest	Inactive	
8	**Theta**	May 31, 1947	University of Cincinnati	Cincinnati, Ohio	North Central	Active	
9	**Iota**	February 14, 1948	Baylor University	Waco, Texas	Southwest	Active	
10	Kappa	May 9, 1948 – 19xx ?; September 28, 1997	University of Texas at El Paso	El Paso, Texas	Southwest	Inactive	
11	**Lambda**	May 18, 1948	University of Michigan	Ann Arbor, Michigan	North Central	Active	
12	Mu	September 9, 1948	University of Denver	Denver, Colorado	Midwest	Inactive	
13	Nu	February 11, 1949	Long Island University	Brooklyn, New York	Northeast	Inactive	
14	**Xi**	May 7, 1949	West Texas A&M University	Canyon, Texas	Southwest	Active	
15	**Omicron**	April 30, 1949 – 19xx ?; October 5, 2003	University of Utah	Salt Lake City, Utah	Western	Active	
16	Pi	April 23, 1949	Nebraska Wesleyan University	Lincoln, Nebraska	Midwest	Inactive	
17	**Rho**	November 19, 1949 – 19xx ?; April 13, 1975	Indiana University Bloomington	Bloomington, Indiana	North Central	Active	
18	**Sigma**	November 12, 1949	Arizona State University	Tempe, Arizona	Western	Inactive	
19	**Tau**	March 25, 1950	University of Houston	Houston, Texas	Southwest	Active	
20	Upsilon	April 28, 1950	Eastern New Mexico University	Portales, New Mexico	Southwest	Inactive	
21	Phi	April 30, 1950	Drury University	Springfield, Missouri	Midwest	Inactive	
22	**Chi**	April 29, 1950	Ohio State University	Columbus, Ohio	North Central	Active	
23	**Psi**	November 11, 1950	University of Arkansas	Fayetteville, Arkansas	Southwest	Active	
24	**Omega**	May 14, 1950	University of Arizona	Tucson, Arizona	Western	Active	
25	Alpha Alpha	May 12, 1950	University of Northern Colorado	Greeley, Colorado	Midwest	Inactive	
26	Alpha Beta	February 4, 1951	University of Tulsa	Tulsa, Oklahoma	Southwest	Inactive	
27	**Alpha Gamma**	February 25, 1951 – 19xx ?; March 12, 2006	Kent State University	Kent, Ohio	North Central	Active	
28	**Alpha Delta**	July 28, 1951	Ohio University	Athens, Ohio	North Central	Active	
29	Alpha Epsilon	May 5, 1951	Midwestern State University	Wichita Falls, Texas	Southwest	Inactive	
30	Alpha Zeta	May 12, 1951	Southern Methodist University	Dallas, Texas	Southwest	Inactive	
31	Alpha Eta	May 17, 1951	Abilene Christian University	Abilene, Texas	Southwest	Inactive	
32	**Alpha Theta**	June 4, 1951	North Dakota State University	Fargo, North Dakota	Midwest	Active	
33	**Alpha Iota**	February 2, 1952 – 19xx ?; June 2, 1990	University of Minnesota	Minneapolis, Minnesota	Midwest	Active	
34	Alpha Kappa	May 3, 1952	Brigham Young University–Idaho	Rexburg, Idaho	Western	Inactive	
35	Alpha Lambda	May 10, 1952	Louisiana State University	Baton Rouge, Louisiana	Southwest	Inactive	
36	Alpha Mu	May 4, 1952	Wichita State University	Wichita, Kansas	Midwest	Inactive	
37	Alpha Nu	May 22, 1952	Oklahoma Panhandle State University	Goodwell, Oklahoma	Southwest	Inactive	
38	**Alpha Xi**	November 7, 1952	Bowling Green State University	Bowling Green, Ohio	North Central	Active	
39	**Alpha Omicron**	November 21, 1952	Sam Houston State University	Huntsville, Texas	Southwest	Active	
40	Alpha Pi	March 21, 1953	Wayne State College	Wayne, Nebraska	Midwest	Inactive	
41	Alpha Rho	March 21, 1953	University of South Dakota	Vermillion, South Dakota	Midwest	Inactive	
42	Alpha Sigma	May 31, 1953	Case Western Reserve University	Cleveland, Ohio	North Central	Inactive	
43	Alpha Tau	February 28, 1954	University of Wyoming	Laramie, Wyoming	Midwest	Inactive	
44	**Alpha Upsilon**	March 18, 1954	Lamar University	Beaumont, Texas	Southwest	Active	
45	Alpha Phi	April 3, 1954	Colorado State University	Fort Collins, Colorado	Midwest	Inactive	
46	**Alpha Chi**	May 9, 1954	Northern Arizona University	Flagstaff, Arizona	Western	Active	
47	Alpha Psi	May 16, 1954	Doane College	Crete, Nebraska	Midwest	Inactive	
48	**Alpha Omega**	May 14, 1955	Florida State University	Tallahassee, Florida	Southeast	Active	
49	Beta Alpha	March 17, 1956	Sul Ross State University	Alpine, Texas	Southwest	Inactive	
50	Beta Beta	April 21, 1956	New Mexico State University	Las Cruces, New Mexico	Southwest	Inactive	
51	**Beta Gamma**	March 8, 1957	University of Texas at Austin	Austin, Texas	Southwest	Active	
52	**Beta Delta**	February 9, 1957	Texas Christian University	Fort Worth, Texas	Southwest	Active	
53	Beta Epsilon	April 6, 1957	Lycoming College	Williamsport, Pennsylvania	Northeast	Inactive	
54	**Beta Zeta**	May 1, 1957	Stephen F. Austin State University	Nacogdoches, Texas	Southwest	Active	
55	**Beta Eta**	April 14, 1957	University of Maryland, College Park	College Park, Maryland	Northeast	Active	
56	Beta Theta	April 28, 1957	University of Science and Arts of Oklahoma	Chickasha, Oklahoma	Southwest	Inactive	
57	Beta Iota	November 17, 1957	Ohio Wesleyan University	Delaware, Ohio	North Central	Inactive	
58	Beta Kappa	May 17, 1957	University of Southern Mississippi	Hattiesburg, Mississippi	Southeast	Inactive	
59	Beta Lambda	May 18, 1957	University of New Mexico	Albuquerque, New Mexico	Southwest	Inactive	
60	Beta Mu	November 17, 1957	Baldwin-Wallace College	Berea, Ohio	North Central	Inactive	
61	**Beta Nu**	March 14, 1958	Arkansas Tech University	Russellville, Arkansas	Southwest	Active	
62	**Beta Xi**	April 12, 1958	University of Florida	Gainesville, Florida	Southeast	Active	
63	**Beta Omicron**	April 12, 1958 – 19xx ?; May 3, 2002	Texas Southern University	Houston, Texas	Southwest	Active	
64	Beta Pi	May 6, 1958	Samford University	Birmingham, Alabama	Southeast	Inactive	
65	Beta Rho	May 18, 1958	Texas Woman's University	Denton, Texas	Southwest	Inactive	
66	**Beta Sigma**	April 12, 1959	Purdue University	West Lafayette, Indiana	North Central	Active	
67	Beta Tau	April 19, 1959	University of Mississippi	Oxford, Mississippi	Southeast	Inactive	
68	Beta Upsilon	April 23, 1960	Montana State University	Bozeman, Montana	Midwest	Inactive	
69	**Beta Phi**	May 26, 1960 – 19xx ?; November 22, 1970 – xxxx ?; February 12, 2011 – 201x ?; April 29, 2018	Florida A&M University	Tallahassee, Florida	Southeast	Active	
70	Beta Chi	March 19, 1961	Cornell University	Ithaca, New York	Northeast	Inactive	
71	Beta Psi	May 14, 1961 – xxxx ?; May 16, 2010 – 20xx ?	South Dakota State University	Brookings, South Dakota	Midwest	Inactive	
72	Beta Omega	May 9, 1961	University of Nevada	Reno, Nevada	Western	Inactive	
73	Gamma Alpha	May 31, 1961	Pittsburg State University	Pittsburg, Kansas	Midwest	Inactive	
74	Gamma Beta	August 25, 1961	Eastern Washington University	Cheney, Washington	Western	Inactive	
75	Gamma Gamma	January 6, 1962	Humboldt State University	Arcata, California	Western	Inactive	
76	Gamma Delta	January 8, 1962	University of Charleston	Charleston, West Virginia	Northeast	Inactive	
77	**Gamma Epsilon**	February 17, 1962 – 19xx ?; December 3, 1977	University of Miami	Coral Gables, Florida	Southeast	Active	
78	Gamma Zeta	April 6, 1962	Emporia State University	Emporia, Kansas	Midwest	Inactive	
79	**Gamma Eta**	May 5, 1962 – 19xx ?; January 23, 1993 – 19xx ?; February 7, 2009	Mississippi Valley State University	Itta Bena, Mississippi	Southeast	Active	
80	Gamma Theta	May 30, 1962	Stanford University	Palo Alto, California	Western	Inactive	
81	Gamma Iota	April 21, 1963	New Mexico Highlands University	Las Vegas, New Mexico	Southwest	Inactive	
82	**Gamma Kappa**	May 17, 1964	University of Connecticut	Storrs, Connecticut	Northeast	Active	
83	Gamma Lambda	May 16, 1964	Adams State College	Alamosa, Colorado	Midwest	Inactive	
84	**Gamma Mu**	May 17, 1964	Ohio Northern University	Ada, Ohio	North Central	Active	
85	**Gamma Nu**	March 28, 1965	University of Texas at Arlington	Arlington, Texas	Southwest	Active	
86	**Gamma Xi**	May 14, 1965	Arkansas State University	Jonesboro, Arkansas	Southwest	Active	
87	**Gamma Omicron**	February 12, 1966 – 19xx ?; May 6, 2001	Southern Arkansas University	Magnolia, Arkansas	Southwest	Active	
88	Gamma Pi	May 22, 1966	Ferris State University	Big Rapids, Michigan	North Central	Inactive	
89	**Gamma Rho**	February 12, 1967	Eastern Michigan University	Ypsilanti, Michigan	North Central	Active	
90	Gamma Sigma	February 17, 1967	University of Arkansas at Little Rock	Little Rock, Arkansas	Southwest	Inactive	
91	Gamma Tau	February 17, 1967	University of Central Arkansas	Conway, Arkansas	Southwest	Active	
92	Gamma Upsilon	April 20, 1968	Western State College	Gunnison, Colorado	Midwest	Inactive	
93	**Gamma Phi**	September 29, 1968	Southwestern Oklahoma State University	Weatherford, Oklahoma	Southwest	Active	
94	**Gamma Chi**	October 6, 1968	Mansfield University of Pennsylvania	Mansfield, Pennsylvania	Northeast	Active	
95	Gamma Psi	February 23, 1969	Northeastern State University	Tahlequah, Oklahoma	Southwest	Inactive	
96	**Gamma Omega**	April 19, 1969 – 197x ?; March 9, 1975 – 19xx ?; November 1, 1987	University of Pittsburgh	Pittsburgh, Pennsylvania	Northeast	Active	
97	**Delta Alpha**	May 4, 1969 – 19xx ?; December 5, 1999 – 20xx ?; March 26, 2021	Langston University	Langston, Oklahoma	Southwest	Active	
98	Delta Beta	April 20, 1969	West Virginia University	Morgantown, West Virginia	Northeast	Inactive	
99	Delta Gamma	April 26, 1969	Western Oregon University	Monmouth, Oregon	Western	Inactive	
100	**Delta Delta**	May 16, 1969	University of Massachusetts Amherst	Amherst, Massachusetts	Northeast	Active	
101	**Delta Epsilon**	December 5, 1969	Miami University	Oxford, Ohio	North Central	Active	
102	Delta Zeta	February 22, 1970	Oregon State University	Corvallis, Oregon	Western	Inactive	
103	**Delta Eta**	March 1, 1970	Texas A&M University–Kingsville	Kingsville, Texas	Southwest	Active	
104	**Delta Theta**	March 21, 1970 – xxxx ?; March 20, 2004	Alabama State University	Montgomery, Alabama	Southeast	Active	
105	Delta Iota	March 22, 1970	Wagner College	Staten Island, New York	Northeast	Inactive	
106	**Delta Kappa**	April 4, 1970	Kansas State University	Manhattan, Kansas	Midwest	Active	
107	Delta Lambda	April 11, 1970	California State University, Sacramento	Sacramento, California	Western	Inactive	
108	Delta Mu	April 25, 1970	Oral Roberts University	Tulsa, Oklahoma	Southwest	Inactive	
109	**Delta Nu**	May 9, 1970	University of Maine	Orono, Maine	Northeast	Active	
110	**Delta Xi**	May 9, 1970	Missouri University of Science and Technology	Rolla, Missouri	Midwest	Active	
111	**Delta Omicron**	May 16, 1970	Clarion University of Pennsylvania	Clarion, Pennsylvania	Northeast	Active	
112	**Delta Pi**	November 15, 1970	University of Arkansas at Pine Bluff	Pine Bluff, Arkansas	Southwest	Active	
113	Delta Rho	November 21, 1970	Missouri State University	Springfield, Missouri	Midwest	Inactive	
114	Delta Sigma	December 12, 1970	University of Louisiana at Monroe	Monroe, Louisiana	Southwest	Inactive	
115	Delta Tau	January 23, 1971	Angelo State University	San Angelo, Texas	Southwest	Inactive	
116	**Delta Upsilon**	April 24, 1971	Howard Payne University	Brownwood, Texas	Southwest	Active	
117	**Delta Phi**	March 21, 1971	Texas Lutheran University	Seguin, Texas	Southwest	Active	
118	Delta Chi	April 25, 1971	University of Tampa	Tampa, Florida	Southeast	Inactive	
119	Delta Psi	May 3, 1971	Southwest Baptist University	Bolivar, Missouri	Midwest	Inactive	
120	Delta Omega	May 16, 1971	Bloomsburg University of Pennsylvania	Bloomsburg, Pennsylvania	Northeast	Inactive	
121	**Epsilon Alpha**	December 4, 1971	University of South Carolina	Columbia, South Carolina	Southeast	Active	
122	**Epsilon Beta**	January 16, 1972	Texas A&M University–Commerce	Commerce, Texas	Southwest	Active	
123	Epsilon Gamma	May 18, 1972	Lane College	Jackson, Tennessee	Southeast	Inactive	
124	Epsilon Delta	December 3, 1972	Marshall University	Huntington, West Virginia	Northeast	Inactive	
125	Epsilon Epsilon	January 20, 1973	Kutztown University of Pennsylvania	Kutztown, Pennsylvania	Northeast	Inactive	
126	Epsilon Zeta	April 23, 1973	Oklahoma Baptist University	Shawnee, Oklahoma	Southwest	Inactive	
127	Epsilon Eta	May 5, 1973 – xxxx ?; January 20, 2006	Tyler Junior College	Tyler, Texas	Southwest	Inactive	
128	**Epsilon Theta**	May 12, 1973	Georgia Institute of Technology	Atlanta, Georgia	Southeast	Active	
129	**Epsilon Iota**	May 27, 1973	University of Akron	Akron, Ohio	North Central	Active	
130	**Epsilon Kappa**	June 2, 1973	University of California, Los Angeles	Los Angeles, California	Western	Active	
131	**Epsilon Lambda**	February 9, 1974 – 19xx ?; March 21, 1993	North Carolina Central University	Durham, North Carolina	Southeast	Active	
132	Epsilon Mu	March 20, 1974	University of Arkansas at Monticello	Monticello, Arkansas	Southwest	Inactive	
133	Epsilon Nu	May 11, 1974	VanderCook College of Music	Chicago, Illinois	North Central	Inactive	
134	**Epsilon Xi**	May 18, 1974	Troy University	Troy, Alabama	Southeast	Active	
135	Epsilon Omicron	June 2, 1974	University of Southern California	Los Angeles, California	Western	Inactive	
136	Epsilon Pi	November 24, 1974	Cameron University	Lawton, Oklahoma	Southwest	Inactive	
137	**Epsilon Rho**	February 1, 1975 – 19xx ?; July 8, 2000	Virginia State University	Petersburg, Virginia	Northeast	Active	
138	**Epsilon Sigma**	May 3, 1975 – 19xx ?; April 28, 1991	Norfolk State University	Norfolk, Virginia	Northeast	Active	
139	Epsilon Tau	May 19, 1975	Weber State University	Ogden, Utah	Western	Inactive	
140	Epsilon Upsilon	October 19, 1975	Lock Haven University of Pennsylvania	Lock Haven, Pennsylvania	Northeast	Inactive	
141	Epsilon Phi	November 23, 1975	Western Carolina University	Cullowhee, North Carolina	Southeast	Inactive	
142	Epsilon Chi	December 5, 1975	South Carolina State University	Orangeburg, South Carolina	Southeast	Inactive	
143	**Epsilon Psi**	January 24, 1976 – 19xx ?; January 29, 1983	Prairie View A&M University	Prairie View, Texas	Southwest	Active	
144	**Epsilon Omega**	April 24, 1976	Morgan State University	Baltimore, Maryland	Northeast	Active	
145	**Zeta Alpha**	May 9, 1976	Illinois State University	Normal, Illinois	North Central	Active	
146	**Zeta Beta**	October 30, 1976	Tuskegee University	Tuskegee, Alabama	Southeast	Active	
147	Zeta Gamma	April 16, 1977	Eastern Illinois University	Charleston, Illinois	North Central	Inactive	
148	**Zeta Delta**	May 7, 1977	University of Kansas	Lawrence, Kansas	Midwest	Active	
149	**Zeta Epsilon**	February 19, 1977	Michigan State University	East Lansing, Michigan	North Central	Active	
150	Zeta Zeta	December 3, 1977	Southern University	Baton Rouge, Louisiana	Southwest	Inactive	
151	Zeta Eta	January 21, 1978	Colorado School of Mines	Golden, Colorado	Midwest	Inactive	
152	Zeta Theta	April 9, 1978	Nicholls State University	Thibodaux, Louisiana	Southwest	Inactive	
153	**Zeta Iota**	May 6, 1978	Jackson State University	Jackson, Mississippi	Southeast	Active	
154	**Zeta Kappa**	May 20, 1978 – 19xx ?; August 23, 1997 – xxxx ?; April 25, 2021	Albany State University	Albany, Georgia	Southeast	Active	
155	Zeta Lambda	May 6, 1978	University of West Alabama	Livingston, Alabama	Southeast	Inactive	
156	**Zeta Mu**	October 22, 1978	Grambling State University	Grambling, Louisiana	Southwest	Active	
157	**Zeta Nu**	March 3, 1979	University of Northern Iowa	Cedar Falls, Iowa	Midwest	Active	
158	**Zeta Xi**	December 16, 1979	San Diego State University	San Diego, California	Western	Active	
159	**Zeta Omicron**	April 7, 1979	Virginia Polytechnic Institute and State University	Blacksburg, Virginia	Northeast	Active	
160	**Zeta Pi**	September 30, 1979 – xxxx ?; March 23, 2022	Tennessee State University	Nashville, Tennessee	Southeast	Active	
161	**Zeta Rho**	March 7, 1981 – 19xx ?; September 9, 1990	Kentucky State University	Frankfort, Kentucky	North Central	Active	
162	Zeta Sigma	April 5, 1981	Xavier University	Cincinnati, Ohio	North Central	Inactive	
163	**Zeta Tau**	December 12, 1981	Valdosta State University	Valdosta, Georgia	Southeast	Active	
164	**Zeta Upsilon**	November 22, 1981	West Chester University	West Chester, Pennsylvania	Northeast	Active	
165	**Zeta Phi**	April 17, 1982	Louisiana Tech University	Ruston, Louisiana	Southwest	Active	
166	Zeta Chi	April 25, 1982	Allegheny College	Meadville, Pennsylvania	Northeast	Inactive	
167	**Zeta Psi**	August 22, 1982	University of Central Florida	Orlando, Florida	Southeast	Active	
168	**Zeta Omega**	September 11, 1982	University of Missouri	Columbia, Missouri	Midwest	Active	
169	**Eta Alpha**	December 4, 1982	Syracuse University	Syracuse, New York	Northeast	Active	
170	**Eta Beta**	May 15, 1983	University of North Alabama	Florence, Alabama	Southeast	Active	
171	**Eta Gamma**	February 11, 1984	Boston University	Boston, Massachusetts	Northeast	Active	
172	**Eta Delta**	February 19, 1984	Howard University	Washington, D.C.	Northeast	Active	
173	Eta Epsilon	February 25, 1984	Texas State University	San Marcos, Texas	Southwest	Inactive	
174	**Eta Zeta**	October 6, 1984	University of Kentucky	Lexington, Kentucky	North Central	Active	
175	**Eta Eta**	November 18, 1984	Central State University	Wilberforce, Ohio	North Central	Active	
176	Eta Theta	April 20, 1985 – 19xx ?; April 22, 2001	Lincoln University of Missouri	Jefferson City, Missouri	Midwest	Inactive	
177	**Eta Iota**	September 8, 1985 – xxxx ?; November 16, 2003-xxxx?; March 28, 2026	Delaware State University	Dover, Delaware	Northeast	Active	
178	Eta Kappa	December 15, 1985	Southeastern Oklahoma State University	Durant, Oklahoma	Southwest	Inactive	
179	**Eta Lambda**	February 21, 1986 – 19xx ?; June 5, 1999	University of Alabama at Birmingham	Birmingham, Alabama	Southeast	Active	
180	Eta Mu	March 2, 1986	Baker University	Baldwin City, Kansas	Midwest	Inactive	
181	**Eta Nu**	March 13, 1986	Tarleton State University	Stephenville, Texas	Southwest	Active	
182	Eta Xi	September 28, 1986	Georgia Southern University	Statesboro, Georgia	Southeast	Inactive	
183	**Eta Omicron**	October 19, 1986 – 19xx ?; December 14, 1996	Johnson C. Smith University	Charlotte, North Carolina	Southeast	Active	
184	**Eta Pi**	February 8, 1987	Northwestern State University	Natchitoches, Louisiana	Southwest	Active	
185	**Eta Rho**	March 21, 1987	James Madison University	Harrisonburg, Virginia	Northeast	Active	
186	**Eta Sigma**	March 22, 1987 – xxxx ?; November 23, 2008	Towson University	Towson, Maryland	Northeast	Active	
187	Eta Tau	November 15, 1987	Navarro College	Corsicana, Texas	Southwest	Inactive	
188	Eta Upsilon	November 15, 1987	Georgia Southwestern State University	Americus, Georgia	Southeast	Inactive	
189	**Eta Phi**	December 5, 1987	Vanderbilt University	Nashville, Tennessee	Southeast	Active	
190	**Eta Chi**	April 9, 1988	University of Rhode Island	Kingston, Rhode Island	Northeast	Active	
191	**Eta Psi**	April 25, 1988	Virginia Union University	Richmond, Virginia	Northeast	Active	
192	**Eta Omega**	April 30, 1988	California State University, Fresno	Fresno, California	Western	Active	
193	**Theta Alpha**	September 18, 1988	Fayetteville State University	Fayetteville, North Carolina	Southeast	Active	
194	Theta Beta	October 22, 1988 – xxxx ?; December 8, 2001	Ouachita Baptist University	Arkadelphia, Arkansas	Southwest	Inactive	
195	**Theta Gamma**	February 4, 1989 – xxxx ?; November 4, 2007 – 20xx ?; April 14, 2024	Alcorn State University	Lorman, Mississippi	Southeast	Active	
196	**Theta Delta**	April 1, 1989	Washington State University	Pullman, Washington	Western	Active	
197	Theta Epsilon	February 1, 1990	University of the Cumberlands	Williamsburg, Kentucky	North Central	Inactive	
198	**Theta Zeta**	February 24, 1990	North Carolina A&T State University	Greensboro, North Carolina	Southeast	Active	
199	Theta Eta	April 13, 1990	Utah State University	Logan, Utah	Western	Inactive	
200	**Theta Theta**	September 9, 1990	Henderson State University	Arkadelphia, Arkansas	Southwest	Active	
201	Theta Iota	October 14, 1990	Alabama A&M University	Normal, Alabama	Southeast	Inactive	
202	Theta Kappa	April 25, 1992	Morris Brown College	Atlanta, Georgia	Southeast	Inactive	
203	**Theta Lambda**	May 24, 1992	Auburn University	Auburn, Alabama	Southeast	Active	
204	**Theta Mu**	December 5, 1993	University of Nebraska at Kearney	Kearney, Nebraska	Midwest	Active	
205	Theta Nu	February 19, 1994	Clark Atlanta University	Atlanta, Georgia	Southeast	Inactive	
206	**Theta Xi**	March 19, 1994	Iowa State University	Ames, Iowa	Midwest	Active	
207	**Theta Omicron**	March 23, 1996	Livingstone College	Salisbury, North Carolina	Southeast	Active	
208	**Theta Pi**	June 18, 1997 – xxxx ?; September 26, 2010 – 20xx ?; April 27, 2025	Bowie State University	Bowie, Maryland	Northeast	Active	
209	**Theta Rho**	December 6, 1997	Bethune-Cookman University	Daytona Beach, Florida	Southeast	Active	
210	**Theta Sigma**	July 26, 1998 – xxxx ?; April 28, 2015	Miles College	Birmingham, Alabama	Southeast	Active	
211	Theta Tau	Aug 9, 1998	McNeese State University	Lake Charles, Louisiana	Southwest	Inactive	
212	**Theta Upsilon**	March 28, 1999	Winston-Salem State University	Winston-Salem, North Carolina	Southeast	Active	
213	**Theta Phi**	June 26, 1999	Hampton University	Hampton, Virginia	Northeast	Active	
214	**Theta Chi**	July 14, 2000-xxxx?; April 19, 2026	Stillman College	Tuscaloosa, Alabama	Southeast	Active	
215	Theta Psi	November 5, 2000	University of Louisville	Louisville, Kentucky	North Central	Inactive	
216	**Theta Omega**	February 24, 2001 – xxxx ?; October 27, 2024	Claflin University	Orangeburg, South Carolina	Southeast	Active	
217	**Iota Alpha**	April 21, 2001	Marist College	Poughkeepsie, New York	Northeast	Active	
218	Iota Beta	February 16, 2003	East Texas Baptist University	Marshall, Texas	Southwest	Inactive	
219	**Iota Gamma**	January 11, 2004 – 20xx ?; April 19, 2024	Fort Valley State University	Fort Valley, Georgia	Southeast	Active	
220	Iota Delta	April 25, 2004	University of West Georgia	Carrollton, Georgia	Southeast	Inactive	
221	**Iota Epsilon**	April 8, 2005	Capital University	Columbus, Ohio	North Central	Active	
222	**Iota Zeta**	April 29, 2006 – 20xx ?; May 14, 2011	Savannah State University	Savannah, Georgia	Southeast	Active	
223	Iota Eta	September 10, 2006	Coahoma Community College	Clarksdale, Mississippi	Southeast	Inactive	
224	**Iota Theta**	April 20, 2007 – 20xx ?; November 10, 2024	Edward Waters University	Jacksonville, Florida	Southeast	Active	
225	Iota Iota	April 28, 2007	Paul Quinn College	Dallas, Texas	Southwest	Inactive	
226	**Iota Kappa**	April 13, 2008	University of Virginia	Charlottesville, Virginia	Northeast	Active	
227	**Iota Lambda**	April 19, 2008	University of North Carolina at Chapel Hill	Chapel Hill, North Carolina	Southeast	Active	
228	**Iota Mu**	September 27, 2009	University of Memphis	Memphis, Tennessee	Southeast	Active	
229	**Iota Nu**	October 10, 2009	East Carolina University	Greenville, North Carolina	Southeast	Active	
230	Iota Xi	October 24, 2009	Elon University	Elon, North Carolina	Southeast	Inactive	
231	**Iota Omicron**	January 29, 2010	Benedict College	Columbia, South Carolina	Southeast	Active	
232	Iota Pi	April 16, 2010	Lincoln University	Lincoln, Pennsylvania	Northeast	Inactive	
233	Iota Rho	April 30, 2010	Spelman College	Atlanta, Georgia	Southeast	Inactive	
234	Iota Sigma	May 23, 2010	Huntingdon College	Montgomery, Alabama	Southeast	Inactive	
235	Iota Tau	February 18, 2012	University of Texas at San Antonio	San Antonio, Texas	Southwest	Inactive	
236	Iota Upsilon	March 21, 2014	Saint Augustine's University	Raleigh, North Carolina	Southeast	Inactive	
237	**Iota Phi**	May 4, 2014	Elizabeth City State University	Elizabeth City, North Carolina	Southeast	Active	
238	**Iota Chi**	March 31, 2015	University of South Florida	Tampa, Florida	Southeast	Active	
239	**Iota Psi**	April 22, 2015	Kennesaw State University	Kennesaw, Georgia	Southeast	Active	
240	**Iota Omega**	May 16, 2020	Chicago State University	Chicago, Illinois	North Central	Active	
241	**Kappa Alpha**	Jan 15, 2021	Slippery Rock University	Slippery Rock, Pennsylvania	Northeast	Active	
242	**Kappa Beta**	April 11, 2023	Florida Memorial University	Miami Gardens, Florida	Southeast	Active	
243	**Kappa Gamma**	April 23, 2023	University of Georgia	Athens, Georgia	Southeast	Active	
244	**Kappa Delta**	October 19, 2025	Wilberforce University	Wilberforce, Ohio	North Central	Active	
