= Hilton Orlando Lake Buena Vista =

Hotel at Walt Disney World

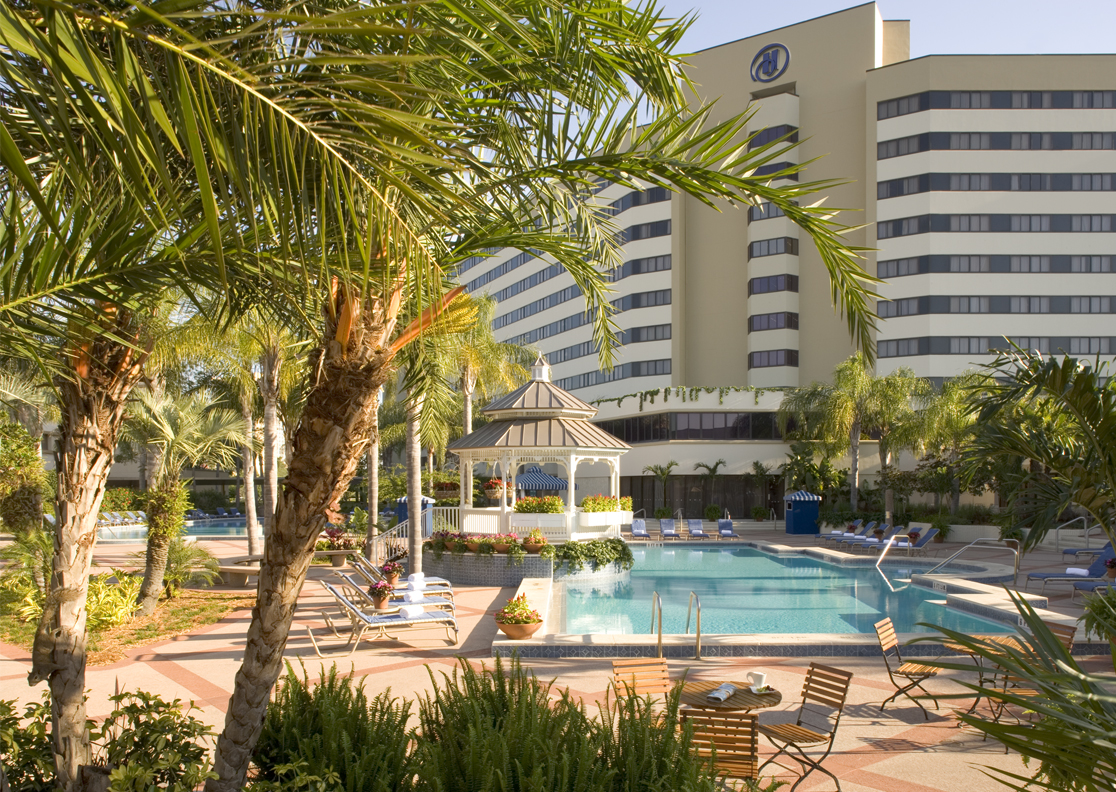
- Interactive map of the Hilton Orlando Lake Buena Vista area

General information
- Location: Walt Disney World, 1751 Hotel Plaza Boulevard; Lake Buena Vista, Florida; United States
- Coordinates: 28°22′21″N 81°30′39″W
- Opening: November 23, 1983
- Management: Hilton Worldwide

Technical details
- Floor count: 10

Design and construction
- Developer: Tischman

Other information
- Number of rooms: 814
- Number of restaurants: 4
- Parking: Ground

Website
- hilton.com/en/hotels/orldwhh-hilton-orlando-lake-buena-vista

The Hilton Orlando Lake Buena Vista is a hotel located adjacent to the Disney Springs complex located on Walt Disney World Resort property in Lake Buena Vista, Florida. The 23-acre (9.3 ha) hotel, which opened on November 23, 1983, is among seven hotels that make up the Disney Springs Resort Area. The Disney Springs Resort Area Hotels are located on the property of the Walt Disney World Resort in Lake Buena Vista, Florida, but are not operated by Disney.

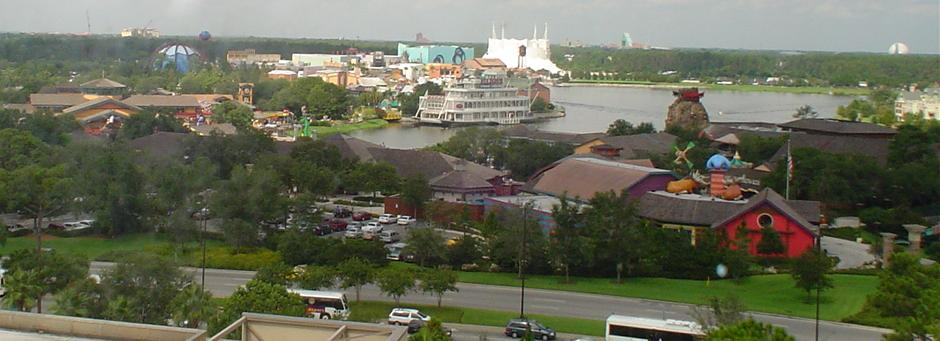
An afternoon view of Disney Springs from a guestroom.

The hotel houses 787 standard guest rooms (605 with double-double beds) and 27 suites. Many guest rooms overlook Disney Springs.

The Hilton is primarily a business/convention hotel and has 75,000 square feet (7,000 m^{2}) of meeting/banquet space, a landscaped outdoor pool area, a fitness center, game room, several shops and seven restaurants.

Every year this hotel hosts the Florida DECA State Career Development Conference.

The hotel is the site for regular training by the tax and audit firm KPMG.

The Hilton Orlando Lake Buena Vista was owned by Tishman Hotel Corporation, however, it is managed by the Hilton Hotels Corporation.

== Renovation ==
The Hilton completed a major overhaul in 2001 but has made significant upgrades since, including replacing the carpeting within its interior corridors, upgrading the Executive Towers Lounge and rooms, overhauling and replacing several restaurants and adding to its convention/banquet space by building an addition across from the pool.

== Gallery ==
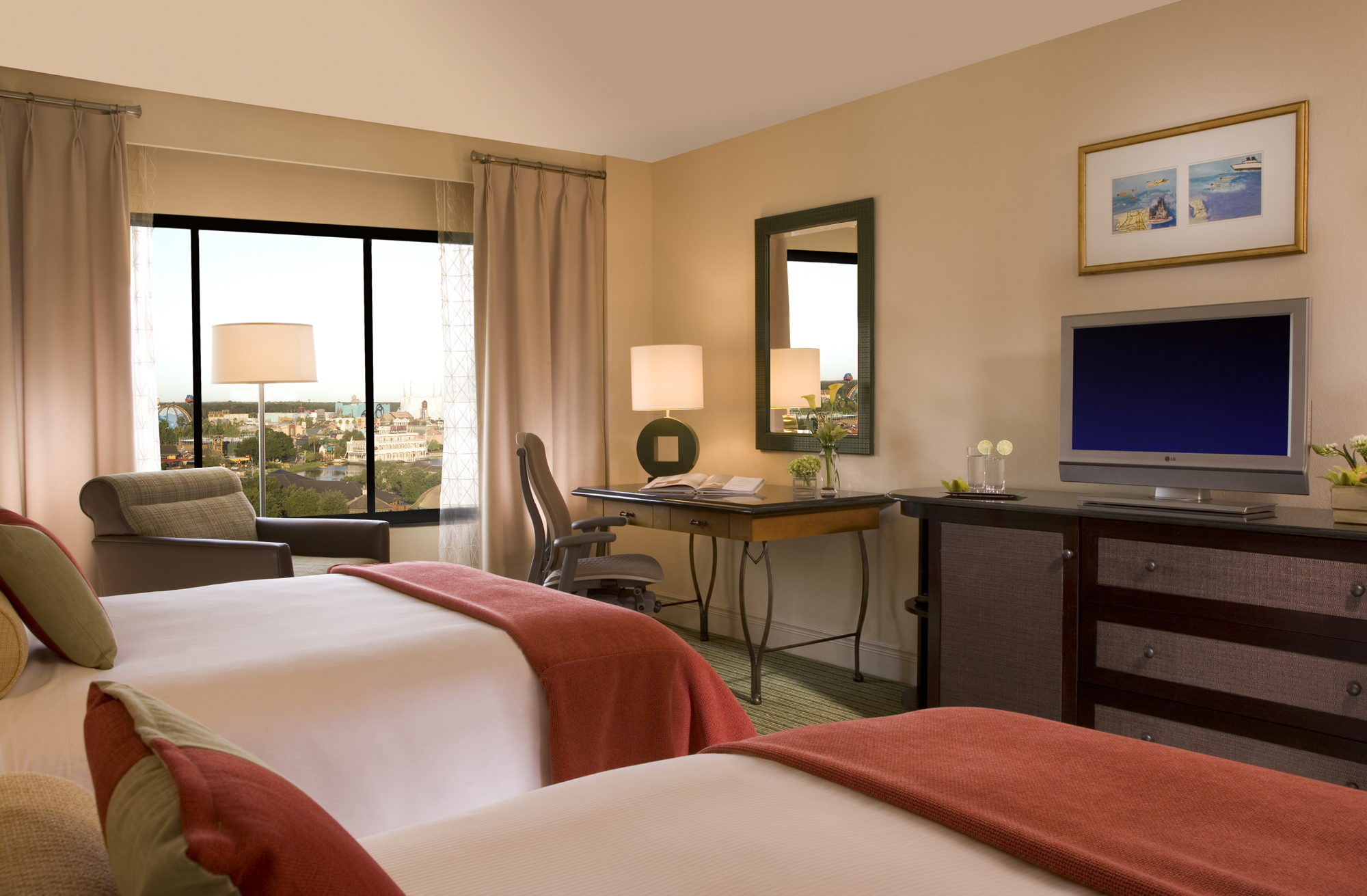
Deluxe Double Guestroom

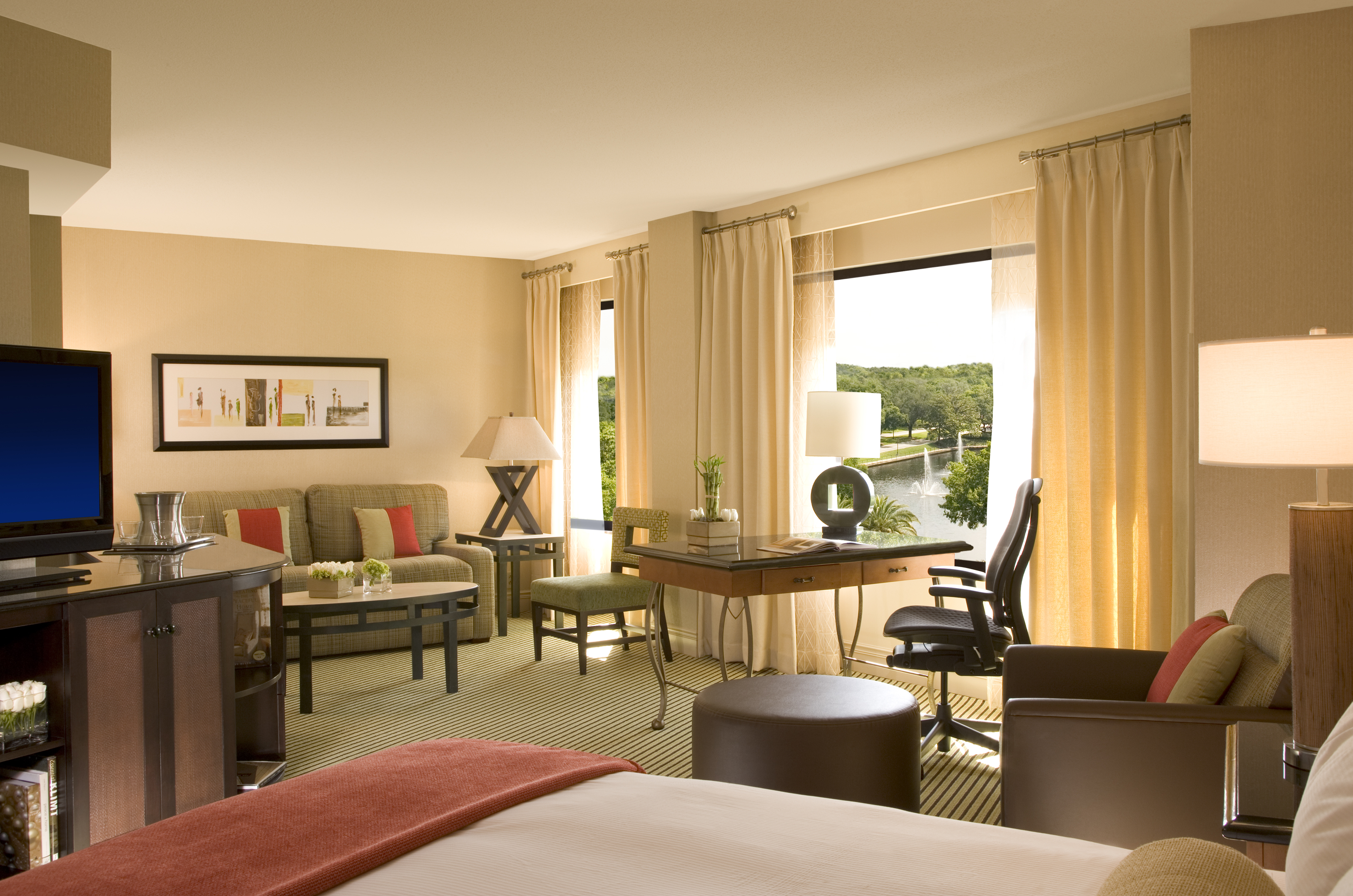
Junior Suite

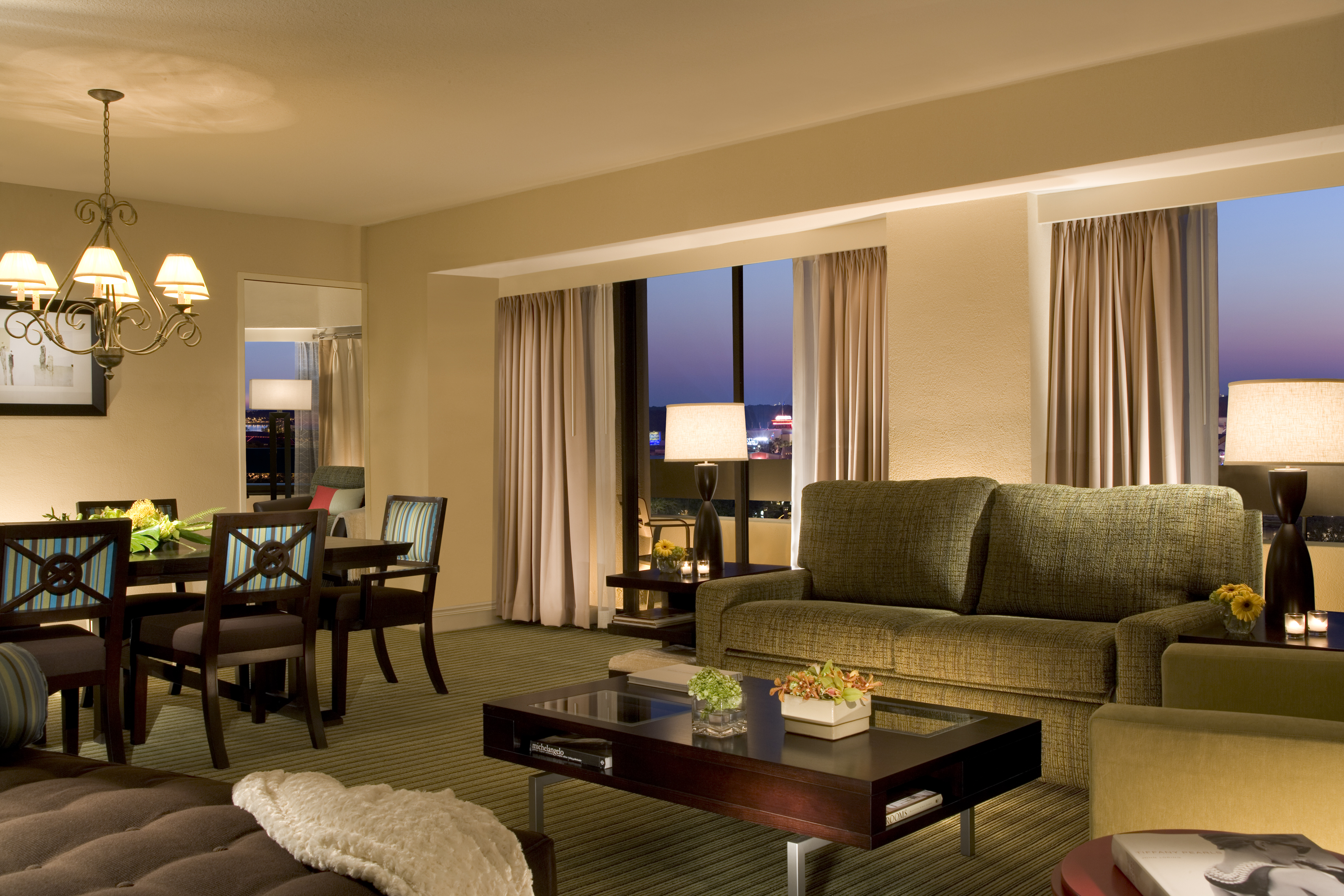
Parlor Suite

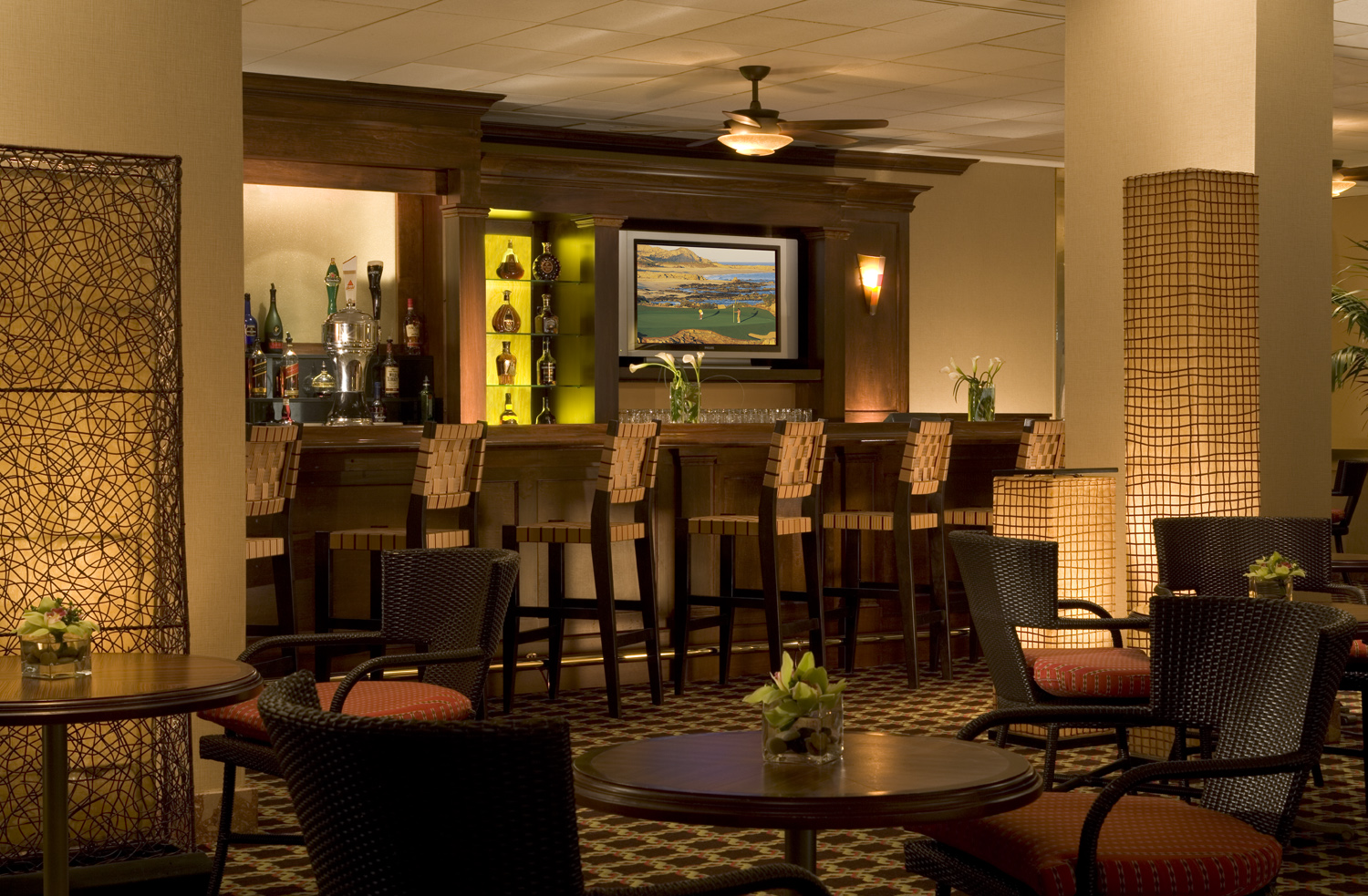
John T's Lounge

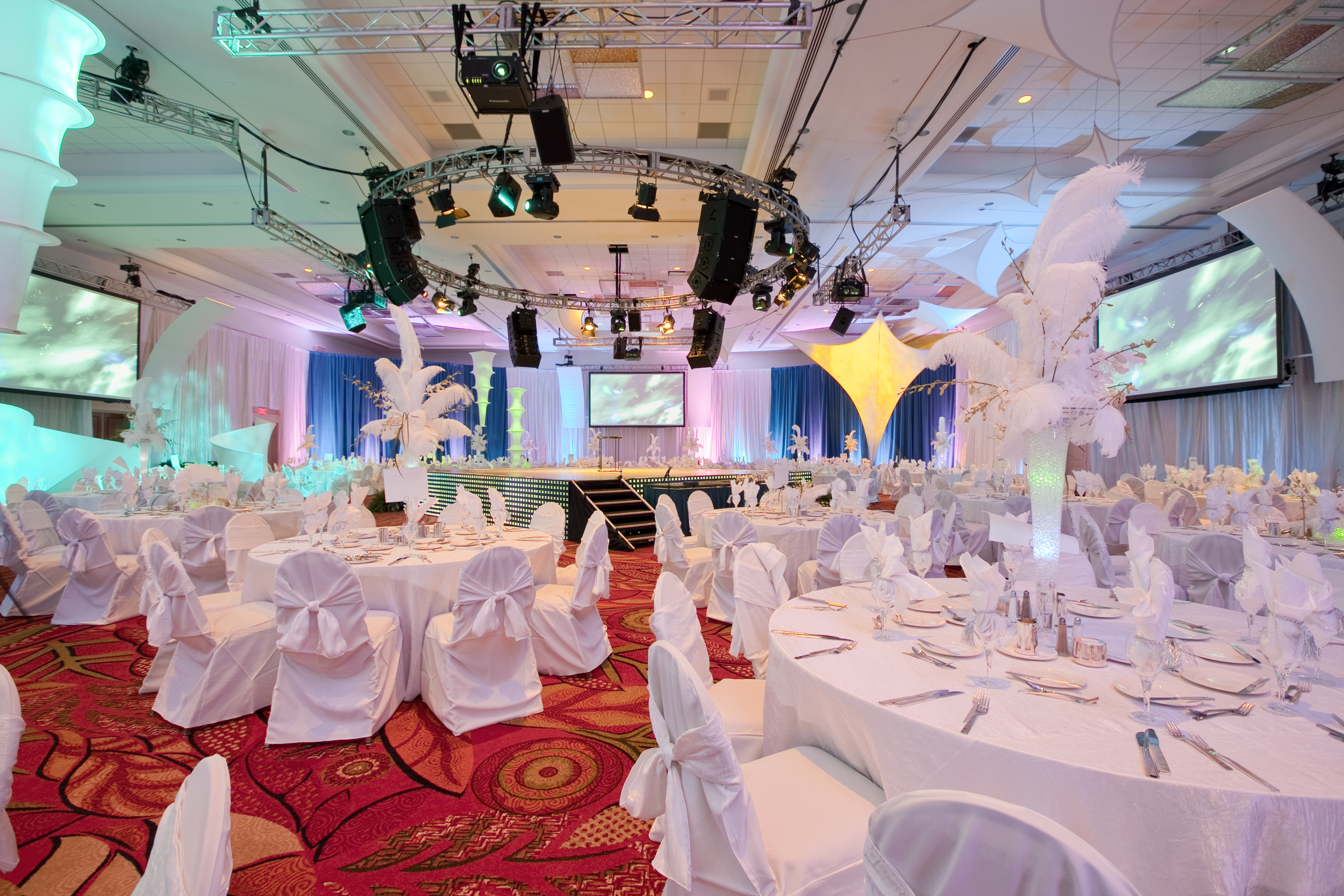
Event in Palm Ballroom
