= Tau Beta Sigma =

Co-educational service sorority

- ΤΒΣ
- Founded: March 26, 1946; 80 years ago Texas Tech University
- Type: Recognition, Service
- Affiliation: PFA; National Interfraternity Music Council (NIMC)
- Status: Active
- Emphasis: Collegiate band
- Scope: National (US)
- Motto: "Tau Beta Sigma for Greater Bands"
- Colors: White and Blue
- Flower: The "American Beauty" Red Rose, long-stemmed
- Publication: The Podium
- Chapters: 120 active, 243 chartered
- Members: 3,800 active 47,000+ lifetime
- Headquarters: 401 East 9th Avenue; Stillwater, Oklahoma 74074; United States
- Website: www.tbsigma.org

Tau Beta Sigma Honorary Band Sorority (ΤΒΣ, colloquially referred to as TBSigma or TBS) is a co-educational recognition and service sorority for collegiate band members. It was established at Texas Technological College in 1946. The sorority has over 3,800 active members in 120 active chapters, and over 40,000 alumni.

Since 1946, Tau Beta Sigma has been recognized by Kappa Kappa Psi as "an equal affiliated organization with a parallel purpose, function, and role in the college and university band setting", and the two organizations hold joint conventions. The two organizations contribute to a national publication called The Podium.

== History ==
=== Overview ===
Tau Beta Sigma was founded at Texas Technological College (now Texas Tech University) in the fall of 1939. Its founders was Wava Banes (Turner Henry). It was established to be a women's version of Kappa Kappa Psi, a music recognition society for band men. The sorority's purpose is "to promote band work among women college students, to encourage musical ability and co-operation in musical organizations, and to help new members of the band to adjust themselves to new environments when entering college."

Due to corporation laws in the state of Texas at the time, however, the Texas Tech sisters surrendered their name, ritual, jewelry, constitution and Alpha chapter designation in January 1946 to the local band sorority at Oklahoma State University. The Alpha chapter of Tau Beta Sigma was installed at Oklahoma State University on March 26, 1946. This had the additional effect of locating both of the Alpha chapters of Tau Beta Sigma and Kappa Kappa Psi at the same school. The founding members of the Alpha chapter were Rosemary Wright, Frances Martin, Ebba Jensen, Mary Belle Reece, Margaret Stanffer, Bernice Friend, and Maribeth Crist. On May 4, 1946, the Beta chapter of Tau Beta Sigma was founded at Texas Tech.

=== Sorority beginnings ===
The first practical idea for establishing a “band sorority” for college and university band women came about during the spring semester of 1939. Wava Banes, along with two of her classmates (Emily SoRelle and Ruth La Nell Williams), took the idea to director D. O. Wiley of the Texas Technological College Band. The idea, patterned after Kappa Kappa Psi, began to come together the following semester and resulted in the campus organization Tau Beta Sigma. Much like the fraternity, Tau Beta Sigma's purpose at Tech was to serve as an honorary service and leadership recognition society, but was designed especially to provide the important additional social, educational, and other positive experiences needed by women in the band. The fledgling organization petitioned for recognition as an official campus organization from Dean of Women Mary Doak in the spring of 1940.

During these initial meetings of 1939–40, the women elected officers and began work on sorority crests and jewelry. The first officers of the organization were president Wava Banes, vice-president Emily SoRelle, secretary Lillian Horner, treasurer Nita Furr, reporter Barbara Griggs, and faculty sponsor D. O. Wiley. SoRelle provided all of the sketch work on the emblem and shield that were adopted as the official emblems of the sorority. However, two of the founding members, Wava and Emily, graduated at the end of the spring 1940 term. As band enrollment changed due to participation in World War II, the girls of the Tech Bands continued to develop the fledgling organization. By October 1941, TBS had begun communications with the national executive secretary of Kappa Kappa Psi for assistance in becoming a national organization.

In June 1943, the Tech women petitioned the Grand Council of Kappa Kappa Psi to become an auxiliary part of the national fraternity as an active chapter. Accepting the group under these circumstances, however, would have entailed a complete revision of the Kappa Kappa Psi constitution. With World War II in progress, it was unsure as to when the national chapter would hold their next convention where the issue could be brought to debate. Rather than postponing action on the women's request indefinitely, the women at Texas Tech approached A. Frank Martin, Grand Executive Secretary of Kappa Kappa Psi, in January 1946 to assist in forming their national organization, just as the National Fraternity had done in 1919. Until a national convention of Kappa Kappa Psi could be held and the matter clarified, Tau Beta Sigma could be considered the “sister organization” of the fraternity. The Grand Council of Kappa Kappa Psi agreed that Tau Beta Sigma could share in all fraternal publications.

Through the assistance of A. Frank Martin, the ritual and national constitution were completed. Likewise, the Balfour Company completed designs for the sorority badge and pledge pin. When applying for a national charter, D. O. Wiley and the girls at Texas Tech again turned to A. Frank Martin and offered to turn over their work and the name Tau Beta Sigma to the women's band sorority at Oklahoma A&M, known as Kappa Psi, to submit the articles of incorporation in Oklahoma. Through this act, the chapter at Oklahoma A&M would become the Alpha chapter. As part of this agreement, the chapter at Texas Tech, Beta, would be known as the founding location of the sorority and the members stipulated that Wava Banes would be known as the founder, the agreement also specified that the first national president would be from the Beta chapter.

Similar women's organizations at Colorado University and the University of Oklahoma submitted petitions to join with the Texas Tech and O.A.M.C. chapter before the official charter was received. On March 26, 1946, a charter was granted by the Department of State for the State of Oklahoma legally establishing Tau Beta Sigma, National Honorary Band Sorority, later amended to Tau Beta Sigma. On May 4, 1946, the members of the Alpha chapter traveled to Lubbock, Texas, to officially install the women of Texas Tech as the Beta chapter of the national sorority.

Since that time, Tau Beta Sigma has expanded to over 230 campuses across the United States. Originally located on the campus of Oklahoma State University, the National Headquarters of Tau Beta Sigma is housed in Stillwater Station, the retired Stillwater Santa Fe Depot in Stillwater, Oklahoma.

=== Ties to other organizations ===
In addition to the close relationship with Kappa Kappa Psi, Tau Beta Sigma has historical and current relationships with several other organizations. One such relationship is with Sigma Alpha Iota, an international fraternity for women with a strong interest in music.

In 1999, joint statements were issued by the leadership of Tau Beta Sigma and Sigma Alpha Iota, along with Kappa Kappa Psi and Phi Mu Alpha Sinfonia, affirming "that there are equally important roles for Phi Mu Alpha Sinfonia, Sigma Alpha Iota, Kappa Kappa Psi, and Tau Beta Sigma to fulfill on any campus where our chapters mutually exist, now or in the future. Each organization possesses a distinct mission and, as a result, fulfills a unique and vital role in the musical environment of a college campus" and "A member of Phi Mu Alpha Sinfonia or Sigma Alpha Iota can hold simultaneous membership in Kappa Kappa Psi or Tau Beta Sigma, subject to his/her own interests and the eligibility requirements of the other organizations. The same holds true for a member of Kappa Kappa Psi or Tau Beta Sigma about membership in Phi Mu Alpha Sinfonia or Sigma Alpha Iota."

== Symbols ==
Tau Beta Sigma's motto is "Tau Beta Sigma for Greater Bands". Its colors are white and blue. Its flower is the American Beauty red rose. Its publication was originally called The Baton, but became The Podium in 1947.

The sorority's badge is a black enamel lozenge-shape with the Greek letters "ΤΒΣ" in its center in gold, with a lyre above and a five-pointed star below. It may be encircled with pearls or other jewels. Its pledge pin is a white enamel rectangle with a treble clef and two notes in gold.

== Activities ==
=== National programs ===
The Focus on Five campaign was introduced by 2013–2015 NVPSP Jonathan Markowski in 2014. The program was designed to promote participation in national programs and has since expanded to include highlighting important chapter operations and district initiatives. Each year, five simple actions related to the National Programs are presented, which each chapter can undertake to "earn" parts of the Tau Beta Sigma flag (stripes and lyre pieces).

The Women in Music Speaker Series engages members of Tau Beta Sigma by providing them with the opportunity to meet and talk with women in various aspects of the music profession. This includes professional performers, music therapists, music educators, and more. The program aims to promote women's voices in the music field by offering them a platform to share their experiences. It was launched in 1997 during the district convention season, and notable speakers in recent years have included performer Cora Coleman-Dunham, composer Julie Giroux, and Captain Michelle Rakers, the assistant director of "The President's Own" Marine Band.

Other national programs include the Crescendo youth initiative and the Bandswomen Networking Program. Tau Beta Sigma also administers an alumni association open to members and friends of both organizations.

=== Programs with Kappa Kappa Psi ===
==== National Intercollegiate Band ====
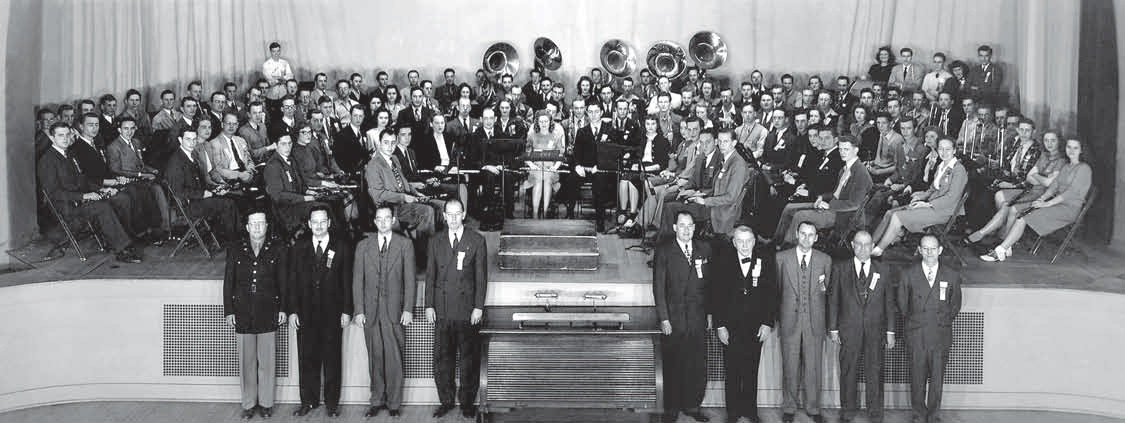
First National Intercollegiate Band, 1947

The National Intercollegiate Band (NIB) is a concert band, sponsored by honorary band fraternity and sorority Kappa Kappa Psi and Tau Beta Sigma, that performs every two years at the national convention of the two organizations. Organized in 1947, the NIB is the oldest national intercollegiate band in the United States and is open to all collegiate band members regardless of membership in Kappa Kappa Psi or Tau Beta Sigma.

==== Commissioning program ====
Since 1953, Kappa Kappa Psi and Tau Beta Sigma have commissioned a new work for wind band to be premiered at almost every National Intercollegiate Band concert. This program was begun to add to the wind repertoire under the direction of Grand President Hugh McMillen, and is the longest-running commissioning project in the United States. A number of these commissioned compositions have garnered national acclaim, including Robert Russell Bennett's Symphonic Songs for Band and Karel Husa's Concerto for Trumpet and Wind Orchestra. In the years following the start of the national commissioning program, local chapters have begun to commission new band works themselves, such as Frank Ticheli's An American Elegy, in memory of the Columbine High School massacre.

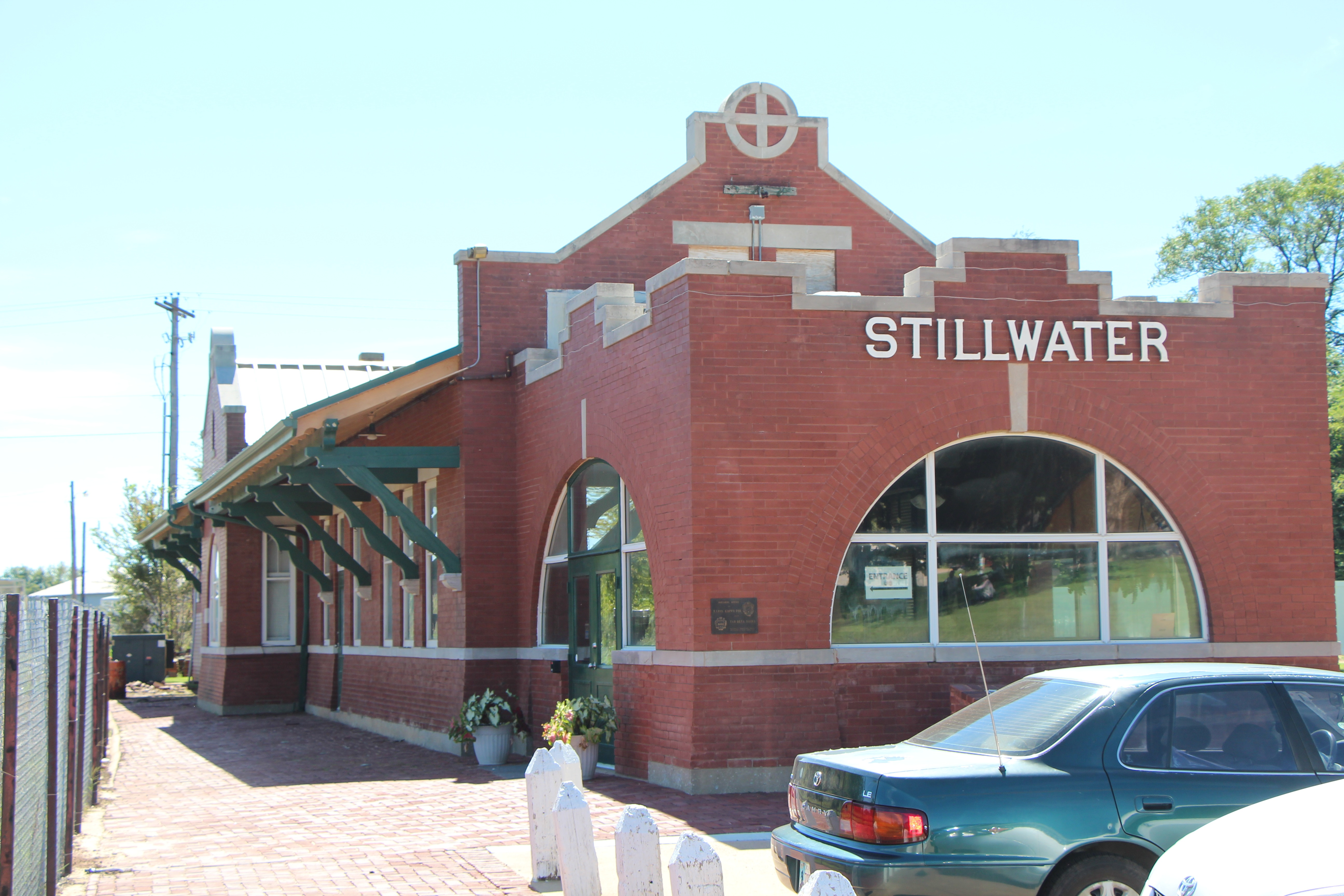
National headquarters at the Santa Fe Stillwater Depot

== Governance ==
The sorority is governed by its national council that is elected at biennial national conventions. Its main officers include the national president, national first vice president, national second vice president, national secretary, and national treasurer. The headquarters staff, led by the executive secretary, carries out the day-to-day operations of the sorority. The sorority's headquarters at the historic Stillwater Santa Fe Depot in Stillwater, Oklahoma.

District map of Tau Beta Sigma

== Chapters ==
The sorority is divided into three basic levels - national, district, and chapter.

The districts are as follows:

| District | Location |
|---|---|
| Midwest | Colorado, Iowa, Kansas, Minnesota, Missouri, Montana, Nebraska, North Dakota, South Dakota, Wyoming |
| North Central | Illinois, Indiana, Kentucky, Michigan, Ohio, Wisconsin |
| Northeast | Connecticut, Delaware, Washington, D.C., Maine, Maryland, Massachusetts, New Hampshire, New Jersey, New York, Pennsylvania, Rhode Island, Vermont, Virginia, West Virginia |
| Southeast | Alabama, Florida, Georgia, Mississippi, North Carolina, South Carolina, Tennessee |
| Southwest | Arkansas, Louisiana, New Mexico, Oklahoma, Texas |
| Western | Alaska, Arizona, California, Hawaii, Idaho, Nevada, Oregon, Utah, Washington |
| International | Outside USA |

== Notable members ==
Notable members of Tau Beta Sigma include:

- Debra Dene Barnes (Gamma Alpha), Miss America 1968
- William "Count" Basie, musician
- Beth Brown, astrophysicist
- Velvet Brown (Honorary, Eta Delta), tubist
- Karen Carpenter, singer
- Richard Carpenter, singer
- John Denver, singer
- Deesha Dyer, White House social secretary
- Sheila E. (Honorary, Eta Delta), percussionist
- Maynard Ferguson, musician
- Roberta Flack (Honorary, Eta Delta), singer
- Lizzo, singer
- Queen Latifah, actress, rapper
- Wynton Marsalis, musician
- Pauline Oliveros, composer, founding member of Tau chapter
- Alfred Reed, composer
- Carl "Doc" Severinsen, musician
- Red Skelton, entertainer
- Erica D. Smith, North Carolina Senator
- Dionne Warwick, singer
- Dianna Williams, dance instructor and star of Lifetime's Bring It!

== See also ==
- Kappa Kappa Psi
- List of works commissioned by Kappa Kappa Psi or Tau Beta Sigma
- List of Kappa Kappa Psi and Tau Beta Sigma national conventions
