= Stillwater station =

Stillwater
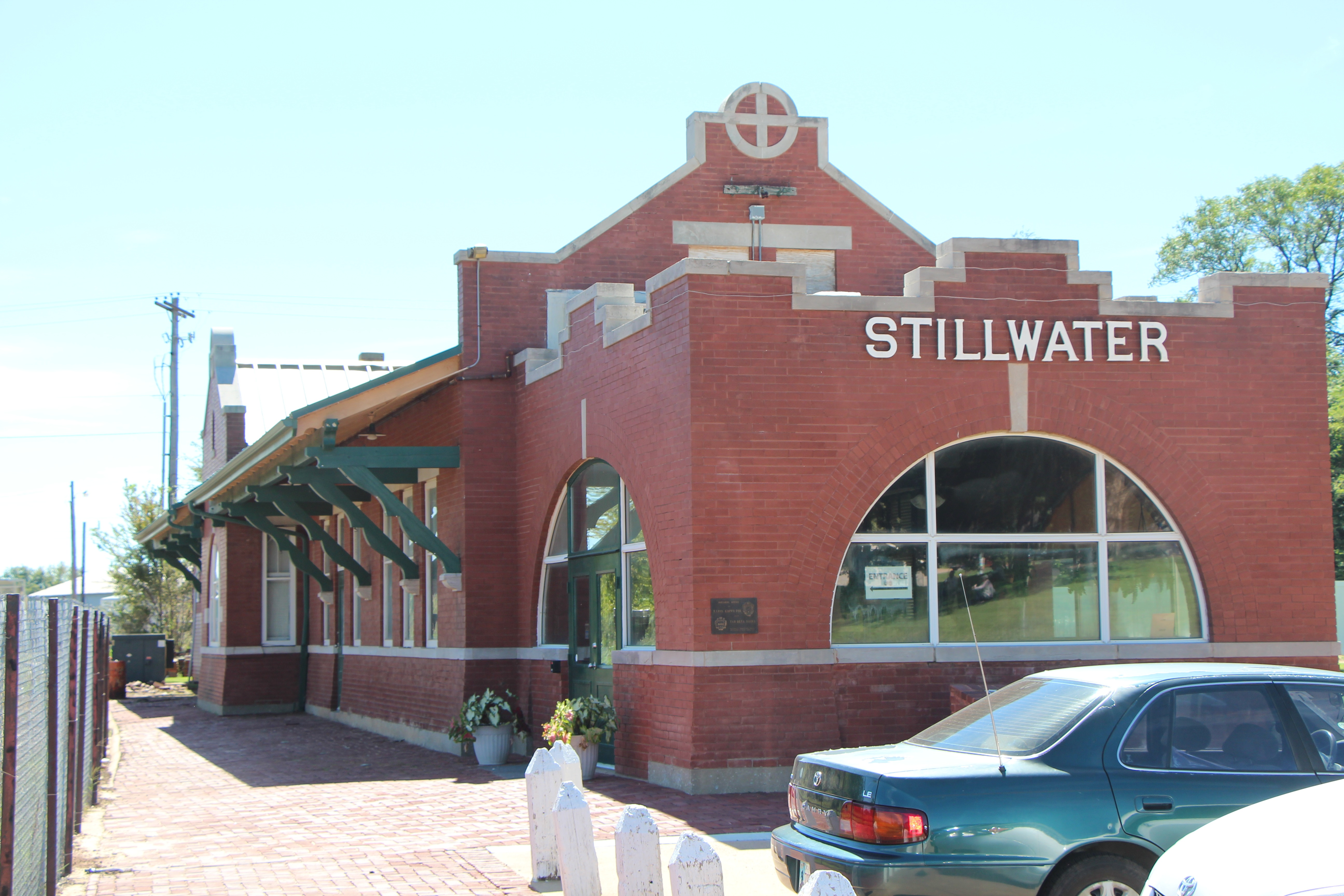

General information
- Location: 401 East 9th Avenue, Stillwater, Oklahoma
- System: Former AT&SF passenger rail station
- Platforms: 1 side platform
- Tracks: 2

Construction
- Structure type: at-grade

History
- Opened: c. 1900
- Closed: 1958
- Rebuilt: 1915

Former services
Preceding station	Atchison, Topeka and Santa Fe Railway	Following station
Yost toward Arkansas City	Arkansas City – Shawnee	Mehan toward Shawnee
- Santa Fe Depot-Stillwater
- U.S. National Register of Historic Places
- Location within Oklahoma Location within the United States
- Location: Payne County, Oklahoma
- Nearest city: Stillwater, Oklahoma
- Coordinates: 36°6′41″N 97°3′17″W
- Area: less than one acre
- Built: 1915
- Built by: Santa Fe Railway Co.
- NRHP reference No.: 80004293
- Added to NRHP: March 3, 1980
Location

The Stillwater Santa Fe Depot is a former railroad station located at 400 East 10th Street in Stillwater, Oklahoma. It served as a rail depot for the Santa Fe Railroad from 1900 until 1958. Now listed on the National Register of Historic Places, it is an example of adaptive re-use of a historic building, serving as the national headquarters for the Kappa Kappa Psi fraternity and Tau Beta Sigma sorority.

== History ==
On April 22, 1889, the day of the Land Rush of 1889, Stillwater, Oklahoma became a populous community for the first time. The town was designated as the county seat of the newly created Payne County, Oklahoma, effective on the day of the rush. The Government Land Office for the Unassigned Lands, where participants in the rush were required to register their land claims had also been established there.

However, it was at least 20 miles (32 km) from the nearest railroad track. Soon, a group of leading residents realized that it would be essential for Stillwater to be located on the railroad if it were to survive, let alone thrive. The need was accentuated after the Territorial legislature selected Stillwater as the site for the new Territorial Agricultural & Mechanical University (now Oklahoma State University.) The legislators began considering selecting another city with better access to rail transportation. The Stillwater supporters began a campaign to get the Eastern Oklahoma Railway Company, a subsidiary of the Atchison, Topeka & Santa Fe Railway Company, to build a line to the town. By March 1900, the railway had been laid into town.

From 1915 until the end of World War II in 1945, both freight and passenger traffic grew substantially. By 1950, passenger demand decreased substantially, as potential riders switched to using their private automobiles. In 1953, the Santa Fe stopped offering passenger service to Stillwater. By 1958, long distance freight hauling had converted to road transport. Petroleum and its bulk derivatives increasingly moved through pipelines. In that year, the Santa Fe ceased moving freight to and from Stillwater, and closed the depot permanently.

== Building description ==
The oldest section of the building is a 20 foot (6.1 m) by 75 foot (23 m) frame structure, that served as both freight office and passenger depot. On the east side, facing the railroad track, were four doors, two windows, plus a bay window with three glass panes, The exterior was covered with horizontal wood panels. The roof had three gables and wooden shingles, two brick chimneys, and valleys over the bay window.

The railroad constructed an adjoining depot building in 1915. This building was 100 feet (30 m) by 20 feet (6.1 m), with exterior walls covered by red brick, with masonry and wood trim. The north end of the new structure was left open, serving as an open-air waiting room. The new structure also has a gable roof, covered with green-glazed terra cotta shingles, and eaves that extend beyond the walls.

Concurrently with the new construction, the 1900 building was modified by replacing the bay window with a double door, while the ticket window and door were covered with siding.

A brick sidewalk surrounds the entire building and extends 200 feet (61 m) farther north. The bricks are the same as used for the walls of the 2015 structure.

The entire depot complex sits on a plot less than one acre in size. The street address is 400 East 10th Street.

== Present status ==
Long-time Stillwater resident Leon Wood read an article in the Stillwater News-Press in 1991 reporting that the old station would soon be auctioned to the highest bidder. He recruited four other residents and persuaded them to help him raise funds to buy the property. They approached the city commissioners, asking them to buy the depot temporarily until they located someone who take permanent ownership and preserve the building. The city commission declined to make such an offer.

The consortium secured a meeting with an official of BancFirst, and made the same proposal. The banker authorized a temporary loan that would meet their needs and told them to go ahead and submit a bid, which was accepted. Within two weeks, Wood and his consortium had met with officials of Kappa Kappa Psi (KKPsi) & Tau Beta Sigma (TBS) - respectively a national band fraternity, and a national band sorority. The two organizations, which shared office space in a building on the Oklahoma State University campus, were already searching for a site off campus for their national headquarters. Only minor internal remodeling was necessary to convert the station into suitable office space. A deal was quickly made that relieved Wood and his consortium of their financial obligation. KKPsi and TBS still occupy the old depot.

== See also ==
- Land Rush of 1889
