= Scott v. Bradford =

- Court: Oklahoma Supreme Court
- Full case name: Norma Jo Scott and Dale M. Scott, Appellants, v. Vance A. Bradford, Appellee.
- Decided: November 28, 1979
- Citation: 606 P.2d 554

Court membership
- Judges sitting: Robert E. Lavender, Pat Irwin, Ralph B. Hodges, Don Barnes, Robert D. Simms, Marian P. Opala, John B. Doolin, Rudolph Hargrave, Norman E. Reynolds (Note: Special Justice)

Case opinions
- Decision by: Doolin
- Concurrence: Lavender, Hodges, Hargrave, Opala
- Concur/dissent: Barnes, Irwin, Simms, Reynolds

Keywords
- Informed consent; Medical malpractice

Scott v. Bradford, 606 P.2d 554 (1979) is a Supreme Court of Oklahoma case.

== Facts ==
Mrs. Scott, the plaintiff, sought treatment from Dr. Bradford. She was diagnosed with several uterine fibroids. She signed a routine consent to surgery form prior to the hysterectomy. Afterward she was experiencing problems with incontinence, and she visited another doctor. She was found to have a fistula between her bladder and vagina which allowed urine to leak from her bladder into her vagina. She underwent three additional surgeries to correct her problem. She claimed the fistula was caused by the doctor's negligence during surgery. The doctor responded that this was a known complication of the surgery. Mrs. Scott said she was never informed of this risk.

== Reasoning ==
The duty to disclose is the first element. Then proof that patient would have chosen no treatment or a different course of treatment had the alternatives and risks been made known, thus establishing a causation. If the patient would have elected to proceed the element of causation is missing, and so too negligence. A causal connection between the patient's injury and the doctor's breach of a duty to disclose exists only when the disclosure of material risks would have resulted in a decision against it. The final element is that of an injury. The risk must have actually materialized, AND pl must have been injured as a result of submitting to the treatment.

=== Exceptions ===
There is no need to disclose risks that either ought to be known by everyone or are already known to the patient; or if the disclosure would alarm an emotionally upset patient; or where there is an emergency and the patient is in no condition to determine for himself whether the treatment should be administered.

== See also ==
- Informed consent (medical procedures)
