= Yvonne Kauger =

American judge (born 1937)

Associate Justice of the Oklahoma Supreme Court
- In office March 11, 1984 – December 1, 2024
- Appointed by: George Nigh
- Preceded by: Ralph B. Hodges
- Succeeded by: Travis Jett

Chief Justice of the Oklahoma Supreme Court
- In office January 1997 – January 1999
- Preceded by: Alma Wilson
- Succeeded by: Hardy Summers

Personal details
- Born: August 3, 1937 (age 89) New Cordell, Oklahoma, U.S.
- Education: Southwestern Oklahoma State University (BA); Oklahoma City University (JD)

Yvonne Kauger (born August 3, 1937) is an American attorney and judge who served as a justice of the Oklahoma Supreme Court from 1984 to 2024. She is the third longest serving Oklahoma Supreme Court justice and served as chief justice from 1997 to 1998. She was appointed by Governor George Nigh.

She was born in New Cordell, Oklahoma, and grew up in Colony, Oklahoma, and is an honorary member of the Cheyenne and Arapaho Tribes. Kauger founded the Gallery of the Plains Indian in Colony, Oklahoma, and is the co-founder of the Red Earth organization. Kauger also serves as Symposium Coordinator of the annual Sovereignty Symposium.

== Early life ==
Kauger was born in New Cordell, Oklahoma, on August 3, 1937, to John and Alice Kauger. She grew up on her family's farm in Colony, Oklahoma. Her father was close friends with Cheyenne artist Archie Blackowl. Upon getting her driver's license, Kauger accepted a summer job at a small law firm and she played basketball in high school. She was the valedictorian of her graduating class at Colony High School in 1955. Her sister died in a plane crash when she was young.

=== Education ===
Kauger attended Southwestern Oklahoma State University where she majored in biology and minored in both chemistry and English. She graduated in three years and worked as a medical technician at a medical arts lab for five years after graduating from an internship program at Saint Anthony Hospital. Kauger used this profession to fund her dream of becoming a lawyer. Kauger received her Juris Doctor degree at Oklahoma City University School of Law in 1969, where she graduated first in her law school class.

Starting in 1972, Kauger worked as a staff attorney for Justice Ralph B. Hodges until she was appointed to succeed him on the Oklahoma Supreme Court.

== Oklahoma Supreme Court ==
Kauger was appointed to the Court by Governor George Nigh in 1984, and was the second woman appointed to the Oklahoma Supreme Court after Alma Wilson. She served as chief justice from January 1997 to January 1999. After losing her retention election in November 2024, she announced she would retire on December 1, 2024. She was the first justice of the Oklahoma Supreme Court to lose a retention election and, including both her service as justice and staff attorney, is the longest serving attorney in the court's history with 52 years of service. She is the third longest serving Oklahoma Supreme Court Justice after Robert E. Lavender and Denver Davison.

In 1984, Kauger was adopted by the Cheyenne and Arapaho Tribes, the first non-Native American adopted by the tribe since statehood.

In 1986, Chief Justice John B. Doolin appointed Kauger to establish and coordinate the Sovereignty Symposium, which has become an annual two-day event sponsored by the Oklahoma Supreme Court. The Symposium was first held in 1988 in the renovated Judicial Center building in Oklahoma City. The symposium attracts national and international experts and tribal leaders to discuss topics connected to art, law and history. Such issues can be exchanged in a scholarly, non-adversarial environment. In 1987, she co-founded Red Earth, an organization focused on Native American culture.

Kauger received the Herbert Harley Award from the American Judicature Society in 1999 and was inducted into the Washita County Hall of Fame. She was inducted into the Oklahoma Women's Hall of Fame in 2001, Oklahoma Hall of Fame, and twice received the Governor's Arts Award.

After the Judicial Center renovation was complete, Kauger decorated the building with 70 pieces of Native American art works that she found in the Oklahoma History Center archives. She then collaborated with writer Gayleen Rabakukk and photographer Neil Chapman, while she served as editor herself.

=== Notable cases ===
On March 21, 2023, Kauger was in a 5–4 majority to declare the constitutional right to abortion in the state of Oklahoma. Kauger wrote a concurrence, discussing how women had the right to abortion even when they lacked many other rights such as the right to vote. Kauger wrote that because of doctors' reluctance to perform even emergency abortions, "the draconian law which allows no exception, in the absence of a medical emergency to preserve the life of the mother, may be a death sentence".

On May 31, 2023, Kauger was in a 6–3 majority striking down 2 Oklahoma abortion laws, one banning abortion after a fetal heartbeat without exceptions and the other being a total ban with some exceptions.

On November 14, 2023, by the original 5–4 vote, the Oklahoma Supreme Court maintained the "life of mother" exception for the abortion ban. Kauger wrote a three sentence concurrence:

One of the dissents states: "Any analysis of an abortion statute that proceeds under the proposition that the life of the unborn is unworthy of consideration is defective."

Any analysis of an abortion statute that proceeds under the proposition that the life of the mother is unworthy of consideration is defective."

In June 2024, Kauger authored a unanimous opinion which struck down a McCurtain County lodging tax election for failing to follow a state statute requiring the county to publish the ballot question "at least four weeks" in a county newspaper.

== Electoral history ==
Retain Yvonne Kauger, 2024
Choice	Votes	%
For	717,063	49.76
Against	723,931	50.24
Total	1,440,994	100.00

== See also ==
- List of female state supreme court justices

Legal offices
Preceded by Ralph B. Hodges	Justice of the Oklahoma Supreme Court; 1984–2024	Succeeded by Travis Jett
Preceded by Alma Wilson	Chief Justice of the Oklahoma Supreme Court; 1997–1999	Succeeded by Hardy Summers
