= Robert D. Simms =

American judge (1926–2008)

Justice of the Oklahoma Supreme Court
- In office October 2, 1972 – September 30, 1999
- Preceded by: Rooney McInerney
- Succeeded by: Daniel J. Boudreau

Chief Justice of the Oklahoma Supreme Court
- In office 1985–1987
- Preceded by: Don Barnes
- Succeeded by: John B. Doolin

Judge of the Oklahoma Court of Criminal Appeals
- In office December 1, 1971 – October 2, 1972
- Preceded by: Kirksey M. Nix
- Succeeded by: C. F. June Bliss Jr.

District Court Judge for Tulsa County
- In office February 19, 1962 – December 1, 1971
- Preceded by: F. S. Nelson
- Succeeded by: Floyd L. Martin

Tulsa County District Attorney
- In office 1958 – February 19, 1962
- Preceded by: J. Howard Edmondson
- Succeeded by: David Hall

Personal details
- Born: February 6, 1926 Sand Springs, Tulsa County, Oklahoma
- Died: January 31, 2008 (aged 81) Sapulpa, Creek County, Oklahoma

Robert D. Simms (February 6, 1926 – January 31, 2008) was a justice of the Oklahoma Supreme Court from 1972 to 1999. He served as chief justice in 1985 to 1986.

Robert D. Simms was born in Sand Springs, Tulsa County, Oklahoma on February 6, 1926 in Tulsa. Son of Matthew Scott and Bessie L. (Moore) Simms. He attended Milligan College, Phillips University and got a Bachelor of Laws at Tulsa University. Served with United States Navy, 1943–1946.

== Early life ==
Simms was a native of Sand Springs and graduated from Sand Springs High School in 1943. (Note: Although all sources agree that Simms graduated from Sand Springs High School, sources are divided on whether he was born in Sand Springs or Tulsa. Those reporting that he was born in Tulsa may have either misread or misinterpreted official documents shown on Ancestry.com which were issued by county offices located in the City of Tulsa.) He won the Craftsman Award given to an outstanding senior boy. He then attended Milligan College, a church related liberal arts college in eastern Tennessee, and Phillips University, another church-related school, in Enid, Oklahoma. Judge Simms received his law degree from the University of Tulsa College of Law in 1950.In 1975 he received a TU College of Law Annual Faculty and Alumni Award for his outstanding service to the legal profession.

== Career in law ==
Starting in 1950 he began private law practice in Sand Springs. He became Assistant Tulsa County Attorney (1953–1954), Chief Prosecutor in County Attorney's office (1955–1958) Tulsa County Attorney (1958–1962), and judge of the Oklahoma District Court, District 14, (1962–1971), Oklahoma Court Criminal Appeals (1971–1972) and justice of the Oklahoma Supreme Court, (1985–2000). Member Oklahoma Crime Commission.

He spent one year on the state Court of Criminal Appeals before his appointment to the Oklahoma Supreme Court in 1972. He served as the chief justice in 1985 and 1986. He retired in October 1999. Governor Frank Keating appointed Daniel J. Boudreau to fill the vacancy created by Simms' retirement.

== Post-retirement Multicounty Grand Jury ==
In 2001, after Robert Simms had retired from the bench, his judicial talents were summoned again for a special service. The Oklahoma Supreme Court, in October 2001, and the Oklahoma Attorney General had authorized the empaneling of a Multicounty Grand Jury (MGJ) to investigate a variety of offenses in all seventy-seven counties of the state. Simms was named as presiding judge of the MGJ. (Note: The scope of any MGJ investigation is limited to offenses that affect two or more counties. Offenses that affect only a single county are excluded from MGJ purview.) The list of offenses that the MGJ investigated was extremely wide-ranging, including "... murder, rape, bribery, extortion, arson, perjury, fraud, embezzlement, violations of the Uniform Controlled Dangerous Substances Act, organized crime, public corruption, securities violations, and crimes involving the sale or purchase of goods or services by state and local subdivisions."

The MGJ's activities resulted in 10 indictments, containing 115 separate counts against 17 individuals. These were delivered to the state Attorney General for prosecution or further investigation. The MGJ also recommend certain changes in state laws to clarify the requirements of agency employees.

In its conclusion, the final report stated that the MGJ stated, "...the Multicounty Grand Jury is an essential and invaluable tool for law enforcement in the State of Oklahoma. Information and evidence were obtained, and cases solved, that would likely not have been otherwise due to the use of the subpoena and investigatory powers of the Multicounty Grand Jury. We believe it is a process which should be continued, funded and fully supported by the citizens, Legislature, Governor, judiciary and law enforcement community of the State.

== Family ==
Simms married Patricia J. Cook in Sand Springs, Tulsa County, Oklahoma on February 12, 1951. They had one son, Robert Simms, Jr., who is married and has two sons.
