= M. John Kane IV =

American judge (born 1962)

John Kane

Chief Justice of the Oklahoma Supreme Court
- In office January 1, 2023 – January 1, 2025
- Preceded by: Richard Darby
- Succeeded by: Dustin Rowe

Justice of the Oklahoma Supreme Court
- Incumbent
- Assumed office September 17, 2019
- Appointed by: Kevin Stitt
- Preceded by: John F. Reif

Personal details
- Born: Pawhuska, Oklahoma, U.S.
- Spouse: Cyndi Kane
- Relatives: Matthew John Kane (great-grandfather)
- Education: Oklahoma State University, Stillwater (BS); University of Oklahoma (JD)

Matthew John Kane IV is an American attorney serving as a justice of the Oklahoma Supreme Court. Kane was appointed the state's highest court by Governor Kevin Stitt in 2019. He served a two year term as chief justice from January 1, 2023 to January 1, 2025. He had previously served as the vice chief justice from 2021 to 2022.

== Education ==
Chief Justice Kane graduated from Pawhuska High School. Kane earned a Bachelor of Science from Oklahoma State University where he was recognized as one of the Top Ten Graduating Senior Men. Chief Justice Kane was awarded his Juris Doctor degree from the University of Oklahoma College of Law.

== Career ==
Kane began his career practicing law with his father and grandfather's law firm, Kane, Kane & Kane Law Offices, P.C. in Pawhuska, Oklahoma. He served as an assistant district attorney and later as an administrative law judge for the Oklahoma Department of Human Services Child Support Division.

=== State judicial service ===
From 2005 to 2019, Kane served as district judge for the 10th Judicial District in Osage County. He served as the Presiding Judge for Northeast Oklahoma, and as the Presiding Judge for the Court on the Oklahoma Judiciary at various times.

On September 17, 2019, Governor Kevin Stitt announced the appointment of Kane to the Oklahoma Supreme Court to the seat vacated by Justice John F. Reif. He began a term as Vice Chief Justice on January 1, 2021. Kane served as Chief Justice of the Oklahoma Supreme Court for 2023-2024.

== Personal life ==
Kane is the great-grandson of Matthew John Kane, a member of Oklahoma's first Supreme Court. He is married to Cyndi "Hyacinth" Kane, author, entrepreneur and friend of Ree Drummond.

Legal offices
Preceded by John F. Reif	Justice of the Oklahoma Supreme Court; 2019–present	Incumbent
Preceded by Richard Darby	Chief Justice of the Oklahoma Supreme Court; 2023–2025	Succeeded by Dustin Rowe
