= Dustin Rowe =

American judge (born 1975)

Chief Justice of the Oklahoma Supreme Court
- Incumbent
- Assumed office January 1, 2025
- Preceded by: M. John Kane IV

Justice of the Oklahoma Supreme Court
- Incumbent
- Assumed office November 20, 2019
- Appointed by: Kevin Stitt
- Preceded by: Patrick Wyrick

Personal details
- Born: September 23, 1975 (age 51) Ada, Oklahoma, U.S.
- Education: East Central University (BA); University of Oklahoma (JD)

Dustin Rowe (born September 23, 1975) is an American attorney from Oklahoma who has served as a justice of the Oklahoma Supreme Court since 2019. He is a former city attorney and one-time city councilman. From 1994 to 1999, he was mayor of Tishomingo, a city of about 3,000 people in the U.S. state of Oklahoma.

== Education ==
Rowe earned his Bachelor of Arts with honors from East Central University in 1998 and his Juris Doctor from the University of Oklahoma College of Law where he was named a Lee B. Thompson Scholar in 2001

== Career ==
In October 1993, upon the resignation of a city councilor, Rowe was appointed to the Tishomingo, Oklahoma city council at the age of 18 while still a junior in high school. He was elected to the council in April 1994 and then the city council elected him mayor. He became the youngest mayor in Oklahoma history making him one of the youngest mayors in United States history. He served as mayor for two terms.

He was the city attorney for Tishomingo, and was a judge with the Chickasaw Nation.

=== Potential congressional run in 2012 ===
In 2011, Rowe formed an exploratory committee to decide whether to run for Oklahoma's 2nd congressional district after sitting Congressman Dan Boren (D-Muskogee) announced his retirement in the 2012 election. Rowe's 2012 run was unsuccessful, as he finished in fourth place with only 10 percent of the vote.

=== Appointment to Oklahoma Supreme Court ===
On November 20, 2019, Governor Kevin Stitt appointed Rowe to the Oklahoma Supreme Court to fill the vacancy left by Patrick Wyrick who was confirmed as a federal district court judge.

== See also ==
- List of Native American jurists

Legal offices
Preceded by Patrick Wyrick	Justice of the Oklahoma Supreme Court; 2019–present	Incumbent
Preceded by M. John Kane IV	Chief Justice of the Oklahoma Supreme Court; 2025–present	Incumbent
