= Patrick Wyrick =

American judge (born 1981)

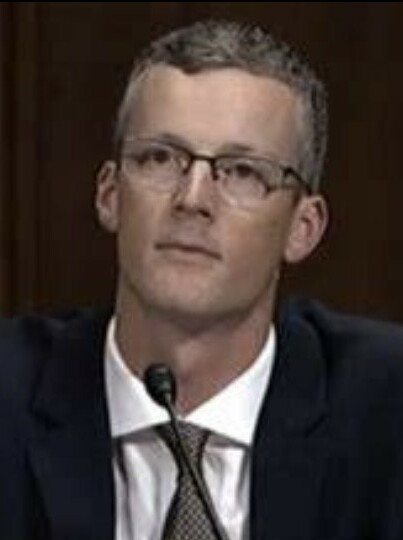

Judge of the United States District Court for the Western District of Oklahoma
- Incumbent
- Assumed office April 10, 2019
- Appointed by: Donald Trump
- Preceded by: David Lynn Russell

Vice Chief Justice of the Oklahoma Supreme Court
- In office January 1, 2019 – April 10, 2019
- Preceded by: Noma Gurich
- Succeeded by: Richard Darby

Associate Justice of the Oklahoma Supreme Court
- In office February 9, 2017 – April 10, 2019
- Appointed by: Mary Fallin
- Preceded by: Steven W. Taylor
- Succeeded by: Dustin Rowe

Solicitor General of Oklahoma
- In office 2011–2017
- Attorney General: Scott Pruitt
- Preceded by: Position established
- Succeeded by: Mithun Mansinghani

Personal details
- Born: Patrick Robert Wyrick; March 11, 1981 (age 45) Denison, Texas, U.S.
- Education: University of Oklahoma (BA, JD)

Patrick Robert Wyrick (born March 11, 1981) is a United States district judge of the United States District Court for the Western District of Oklahoma and a former Associate Justice of the Oklahoma Supreme Court.

Wyrick previously served as Solicitor General in the Office of the Oklahoma Attorney General from 2011 to 2017.

== Education and early career ==
Wyrick was born in Denison, Texas, and raised in Atoka, Oklahoma, where he graduated from Atoka High School. He earned a Bachelor of Arts degree from the University of Oklahoma in 2004, majoring in sociology and criminology, and received a Juris Doctor degree from the University of Oklahoma College of Law in 2007. Wyrick clerked for Judge James H. Payne of the United States District Court for the Eastern District of Oklahoma from 2007 to 2008.

Wyrick was an associate at the Oklahoma City law firm GableGotwals from 2008 to 2011, when he was hired by the office of Oklahoma Attorney General Scott Pruitt to become the state's first solicitor general. Wyrick argued on behalf of the state in numerous cases before the Oklahoma Supreme Court and in federal courts. Notably, he argued before the U.S. Supreme Court in the lethal injection case Glossip v. Gross (2015), where the court ruled in Oklahoma's favor by a 5–4 vote. Justices Sonia Sotomayor and Elena Kagan questioned Wyrick "forcefully" and "intensely" during oral arguments in the case.

== State judicial service ==
Oklahoma Supreme Court justice Steven W. Taylor retired on December 31, 2016. The Oklahoma Judicial Nominating Commission submitted three names of potential nominees to replace Taylor to Governor Mary Fallin. Wyrick and two Oklahoma district court judges, Mark Campbell and Jonathan Sullivan, were nominated by the commission. Fallin selected Wyrick for the vacancy, and he was appointed on February 9, 2017. He was elected Vice Chief Justice on November 15, 2018, for a term starting January 1, 2019. His tenure as an associate justice ended on April 10, 2019, when he received his commission as a federal district judge.

The American Civil Liberties Union (ACLU) of Oklahoma, acting on behalf of two Oklahoma residents, filed a lawsuit challenging Wyrick's appointment, arguing that he did not meet residency requirements for his judgeship. The Oklahoma Supreme Court dismissed the lawsuit on the grounds that the two residents lacked standing to sue.

On November 17, 2017, Wyrick was named by President Donald Trump as a potential nominee to the Supreme Court of the United States.

Wyrick ran in the retention election in November 2018 for a new six-year term. He was retained, with 62% of voters voting to retain him.

== Federal judicial service ==
On April 10, 2018, President Donald Trump nominated Wyrick to serve as a United States District Judge of the United States District Court for the Western District of Oklahoma. He was nominated to the seat vacated by Judge David Lynn Russell, who assumed senior status on July 7, 2013. On May 23, 2018, a hearing on his nomination was held before the Senate Judiciary Committee. During his confirmation hearing, Democratic Senator Sheldon Whitehouse questioned him about an exchange he had with U.S. Supreme Court Justice Sonia Sotomayor during a 2015 death penalty case before the court. On June 14, 2018, his nomination was reported out of committee by an 11–10 vote.

On January 3, 2019, his nomination was returned to the President under Rule XXXI, Paragraph 6 of the United States Senate. On January 23, 2019, President Trump announced his intent to renominate Wyrick for a federal judgeship. His nomination was sent to the Senate later that day. On February 7, 2019, his nomination was reported out of committee by a 12–10 vote. On April 9, 2019, the Senate invoked cloture on his nomination by a 53–46 vote. He was confirmed later that day by a 53–47 vote. He received his judicial commission on April 10, 2019.

=== Notable rulings ===
On February 3, 2023, he dismissed an indictment against a man who was charged with violating the federal ban on marijuana users possessing a firearm, ruling that the ban was unconstitutional in the wake of New York State Rifle and Pistol Association v. Bruen.

== Memberships ==
He has been a member of the Federalist Society since approximately 2011.

== Electoral history ==
2018

Oklahoma Supreme Court – District 2 – Retain Patrick Wyrick, November 6, 2018
| Party | Candidate | Votes | % |
|---|---|---|---|
| Nonpartisan | Yes | 635,334 | 61.65% |
| Nonpartisan | No | 395,216 | 38.35% |
| Majority | | 240,118 | 23.30% |
| Total votes | | 1,030,550 | 100.00% |

== See also ==
- Donald Trump Supreme Court candidates
- Donald Trump judicial appointment controversies

Legal offices
| New office | Solicitor General of Oklahoma; 2011–2017 | Succeeded by Mithun Mansinghani |
| Preceded by Steven W. Taylor | Associate Justice of the Oklahoma Supreme Court; 2017–2019 | Succeeded by Dustin Rowe |
| Preceded by David Lynn Russell | Judge of the United States District Court for the Western District of Oklahoma; 2019–present | Incumbent |
