= Steven W. Taylor =

American judge

Chief Justice of the Oklahoma Supreme Court
- In office 2011–2013
- Preceded by: James E. Edmondson
- Succeeded by: Tom Colbert

Justice of the Oklahoma Supreme Court
- In office September 24, 2004 – December 31, 2016
- Appointed by: Brad Henry
- Preceded by: Ralph B. Hodges
- Succeeded by: Patrick Wyrick

District Court Judge of Pittsburg County, Oklahoma
- In office 1984–2004

Mayor of McAlester, Oklahoma
- In office 1982–1984

Personal details
- Born: June 7, 1949 (age 77) Henryetta, Oklahoma, U.S.
- Spouse: Mary Taylor
- Children: 1 son
- Education: Oklahoma State University (B.A., 1971); University of Oklahoma College of Law (J.D., 1974)
- Profession: Attorney, Judge

Military service
- Branch/service: United States Marine Corps
- Years of service: 1970-1978
- Rank: Major

Steven W. Taylor (born June 7, 1949) is a former Chief Justice of the Oklahoma Supreme Court. He is a former mayor of McAlester, Oklahoma. As a state district court judge, Taylor was the presiding judge in the state trial of the Oklahoma City bombing.

== Early life ==
Steven Taylor was born in Henryetta, Oklahoma. In 1967 he graduated McAlester High School in McAlester, Oklahoma. He earned a B.A. in political science from Oklahoma State University, and a Juris Doctor from the University of Oklahoma College of Law.

== Career ==
From 1970 to 1978, Taylor served in the United States Marine Corps. Following his training as an infantry platoon commander, he served as a prosecutor, defense counsel, and ultimately as a Special Court Martial Judge. He became the youngest judge in the U.S. armed forces at the age of 28. He was later promoted to the rank of Major. In 1978, he married public school teacher Mary E. B. Taylor. They have one son, Wilson Taylor, who is the Director of Logistics for the Oklahoma City Thunder NBA team. Following a two-year stint on the McAlester City Council, he served as the city's youngest mayor from 1982 to 1984. In 1983, he was named one of the "Three Outstanding Young Oklahomans. In 1985, the City of McAlester named its new industrial park the "Steven W. Taylor Industrial Park" in recognition of his economic development efforts as mayor. In 1999, Taylor was recognized as "Citizen of the Year" in McAlester. The Oklahoma Bar Association granted him the "Award of Judicial Excellence" in 2003.

Taylor was inducted into the Oklahoma State University Hall of Fame in 2007. The University of Oklahoma presented Justice Taylor its Regents Alumni Award in 2009; with this award, he became the only person ever to receive the highest alumni recognition of both Oklahoma State University and the University of Oklahoma. Taylor served for several years on the Board of Visitors of the University of Oklahoma College of Law and was named to the OU College of Law Hall of Fame in 2017. He is the co-author of University of Oklahoma College of Law: A Centennial History a book published in 2009 detailing the 100-year history of the OU law school. In April 2019 Governor Kevin Stitt appointed Justice Taylor to a nine-year term on the Oklahoma State Regents for Higher Education and the Oklahoma Senate confirmed the appointment in May 2019.

Taylor is a board member of the Oklahoma Hall of Fame. He also serves on the board of directors of the Oklahoma Medical Research Foundation and is a past Chairman of the Oklahoma City National Memorial. He is Chairman of The Puterbaugh Foundation in McAlester, Oklahoma.

In 2007, Oklahoma's centennial year, OKLAHOMA magazine named Justice Taylor as one of "100 Who Shaped Us" - a list of past and living Oklahomans who influenced the state's first 100 years.

In 2009, Taylor received the highest recognition given to an Oklahoman, induction into the Oklahoma Hall of Fame.

== Judicial career ==
From 1984 to 1994, Taylor served as Associate District Judge in the 18th Judicial District. In 1991 he was the first Associate District Judge ever to be elected President of the Oklahoma Judicial Conference. From 1994 to 2004, he served as Chief Judge of the 18th Judicial District, which encompasses Pittsburg and McIntosh Counties. In his over 20 years as a trial judge, he presided over more than 500 jury trials, including numerous murder trials. Most notably, he presided over the state trial of the Oklahoma City bombing case. That historic trial of 161 counts of first degree murder against Terry Nichols was conducted in McAlester, Oklahoma after a change of venue from Oklahoma City was ordered. In 2025, a book, Oklahoma Justice: The State Trial of Terry Nichols by Bob Burke and Nolan Clay was published. Governor Brad Henry appointed Taylor to the Oklahoma Supreme Court in September 2004. He served a term as chief justice from January 2011 until January 2013. Oklahomans voted to retain him in the 2006 and 2010 general elections. Justice Taylor retired from the Supreme Court on December 31, 2016 after 33 years of judicial service. After his retirement and in recognition of his long public service, the Pittsburg County Court buildings in McAlester, Oklahoma were named "The Justice Steven W. Taylor Courthouse Complex".
