= Rudolph Hargrave =

American judge (1925–2014)

Justice of the Oklahoma Supreme Court
- In office October 10, 1978 – December 31, 2010
- Appointed by: David L. Boren
- Preceded by: Denver Davison
- Succeeded by: Doug Combs

Chief Justice of the Oklahoma Supreme Court
- In office 2001–2003
- Preceded by: Hardy Summers
- Succeeded by: Joseph M. Watt
- In office 1989–1991
- Preceded by: John B. Doolin
- Succeeded by: Marian P. Opala

District Judge, Seminole County, Oklahoma
- In office 1969–1978

Personal details
- Born: February 15, 1925 Shawnee, Oklahoma
- Died: April 1, 2014 (aged 89) Ada, Oklahoma
- Spouse: Madeline Shipley Hargrave
- Children: 3
- Education: East Central State University; University of Oklahoma

Rudolph Hargrave (February 15, 1925 – April 1, 2014) was an American Judge who served as a justice of the Oklahoma Supreme Court from 1978 until his retirement on December 31, 2010. Before being elevated to the highest court, he was a superior court and district judge for Seminole County from 1969 to 1978.

== Early life and education ==
Born February 15, 1925, in Shawnee, Oklahoma, Rudolph Hargrave resided in Wewoka for most of his life. His parents were John Hubert Hargrave and Daisy (Holmes) Hargrave. He attended Wewoka public schools, East Central State University in Ada, Oklahoma, and the University of Oklahoma, where he received his law degree in 1949. He was a member of Delta Theta Phi legal fraternity.

== Career ==
He began in private practice in Wewoka after graduation. In 1964, he was elected County Judge for Seminole County, Oklahoma until 1967. From 1967 to 1969, Hargrave was a superior court judge and then a district judge from 1969 to 1978, both in the same county.

On October 10, 1978, Hargrave was appointed to the Oklahoma Supreme Court by Governor David L. Boren, replacing Denver Davison, who had been serving since 1937 as the District 8 justice. Hargrave was retained in 1989, 1986, and 1992 by the voters for six-year terms. He was elected Chief Justice on January 1, 1989. During his term as Chief, he was elected by the National Conference of Chief Justices as its vice-president, the only Oklahoma justice serve in that position. He was also a member of the Seminole County Bar Association, Oklahoma Bar Association, American Bar Association and the Oklahoma Judicial Conference. Hargrave retired from the court effective December 31, 2010. Governor Brad Henry announced that Judge Douglas L. Combs would replace Hargrave on January 1, 2011.

== Personal ==
Hargrave and his wife, Madeline, had three children, Cindy Keefer of Ada, Oklahoma, John Robert Hargrave of Wewoka, Oklahoma, and Jana Howard of Ardmore, Oklahoma. (Note: Madeline's maiden name was Shipley.)

Hargrave was a 32nd Degree Mason and belonged to the United Methodist Men's Group.

== Death ==
Hargrave died on April 1, 2014. He was buried in Oakwood Cemetery in Wewoka.

== Honors ==
- Hargrave received the Distinguished Alumnus Award in 1969 from ECU.
- The Sovereignty Symposium’s writing awards, the Hargrave Prizes, are named in his honor.
- In August, 2013, a moot courtroom in the new ECU Chickasaw Business and Conference Center was named for Judge Hargrave.
