= John B. Harrison =

American judge (1861–1947)

- Born: John Buntin Harrison; April 10, 1861; Anderson County, Kentucky
- Died: April 12, 1947 (aged 86); Oklahoma City
- Occupations: School teacher, attorney, judge
- Years active: 1891-1936
- Known for: Justice of the Oklahoma Supreme Court from 1927 to 1929.
- Notable work: Resolved constitutional eligibility of Lieutenant Governor to succeed impeached governor in Oklahoma.

John B. Harrison (1861 – 1947) was a justice of the Oklahoma Supreme Court from 1927 to 1929.

== Early life ==
Born in Anderson County, Kentucky on 10 April 1861, he was the son of William Garrett Harrison and his wife, Mary Lucretia (Buntin) Harrison. He attended the common schools of Anderson County, but moved to Texas, where he went to high schools in Gainesville and Whitesboro, and an academy at Paris, Texas. After finishing his schooling, John went to West Texas to work on cattle ranches and later to teach school, until he was admitted to the bar in Greer County, Texas. (Note: Since his biography does not mention attending any law schools, it seems reasonable to believe that his legal training consisted solely of "reading the law" with an experienced attorney until he could pass the state bar exam.) As a licensed attorney, he became County Judge in Wheeler, Texas.

== Career in law ==
In 1891, Harrison moved to that part of Greer County that the U. S. Supreme Court would award to Oklahoma. (Note: The boundary change became effective on May 4, 1896.) In 1894, Harrison moved to the newly created Roger Mills County, Oklahoma, (Note: When Harrison moved to this area in 1891 and settled in the community of Cheyenne, it was known as Day County, Oklahoma Territory, which it remained until statehood on November 16, 1907. Immediately upon statehood, Day County was abolished and Roger Mills County replaced it.) where he became County Attorney from 1894 to 1898.

In 1911, he was appointed as a judge on the Supreme Court Commission. He resigned in 1914, to accept an appointment as an Assistant Attorney General of Oklahoma, serving under Attorney General Sargent Prentiss Freeling. His term expired on February 1, 1915,

The Harrisons continued to live in Oklahoma City after his resignation from the Supreme Court in 1928. He practiced law privately until his death in 1947.

== Personal ==
John B. Harrison married Henrietta (née) Wallach on April 30, 1891, at Mangum, Oklahoma Territory. They had six children, four sons and two daughters. (Note: One child died at the age of six years.)

He had belonged to the following organizations:

- Christian Church; Memberships
- Oklahoma Bar Association
- Democratic party
- Oklahoma Hall of Fame

== See also ==
Reading the law
