= Tom Colbert =

American judge

Chief Justice of the Oklahoma Supreme Court
- In office January 4, 2013 – January 3, 2015
- Preceded by: Steven W. Taylor
- Succeeded by: John F. Reif

Associate Justice of the Oklahoma Supreme Court
- In office October 7, 2004 – February 1, 2021
- Appointed by: Brad Henry
- Preceded by: Daniel J. Boudreau
- Succeeded by: Dana Kuehn

Personal details
- Born: December 30, 1949 (age 76) Oklahoma City, Oklahoma
- Education: Eastern Oklahoma State College; Kentucky State University (BS); Eastern Kentucky University (MA); University of Oklahoma College of Law (JD)

Tom Colbert (born December 30, 1949) is a former Associate Justice of the Oklahoma Supreme Court. He was appointed to the Court's District 6 seat in 2004, by Governor Brad Henry, becoming the first African-American to serve on the court. On January 4, 2013, he was sworn in as Chief Justice of the Supreme Court, and served In that post until January 2015. After completing his two-year term as Chief Justice, he resumed his previous position on the court as Associate Justice representing the 6th Judicial District. On January 19, 2021, Colbert's retirement was announced by the Oklahoma Supreme Court, effective February 1 of the same year.

== Early life ==
Colbert was born in Oklahoma City, Oklahoma, and graduated from high school in Sapulpa, Oklahoma. His educational background includes an associate degree from Eastern Oklahoma State College, and a Bachelor of Science degree from Kentucky State University in 1973. After completing his service in the U.S. Army, he enrolled in Eastern Kentucky University, where he earned a master's degree in Health Education, then moved to Chicago to begin teaching in the public schools.

He soon moved back to Oklahoma, where he entered the University of Oklahoma College of Law, and earned and a Juris Doctor degree in 1982. He was then hired as assistant dean at Marquette University Law School, where he worked until 1984.

== Career in law ==
In between his attendance at EKU and OU, Colbert served in the Criminal Investigation Division of the United States Army. Following graduation from law school in 1982, he moved to Milwaukee, Wisconsin in order to accept the post of Assistant Dean of Marquette University Law School, serving until 1984. Returning to Oklahoma in 1984, he was appointed as an Assistant District Attorney in Oklahoma County, serving in that capacity until 1986. He entered private law practice in Oklahoma City in 1986. Over the next decade, he alternated between private practice and service as an attorney with the Oklahoma Department of Human Services. (Note: He worked at the private firm Miles-LaGrange & Colbert, where his partner was Vicki Miles-LaGrange, who later became chief judge of the U.S. District Court for the Western District of Oklahoma. In 1989, the firm was renamed Colbert and Associates.) Between 1986 and 2000 he also served as assistant general counsel for the Oklahoma Department of Human Services. From 1999 to 2004, he served as a Judge on the Oklahoma Court of Civil Appeals and was the first African-American to serve on that Court. (Note: Governor Frank Keating appointed Colbert to the Court of Civil Appeals.) Colbert briefly served as Chief Judge of the Oklahoma Court of Civil Appeals prior to his appointment to the Oklahoma Supreme Court District 6 seat in 2004, by Governor Brad Henry, becoming the first African-American to serve on the court. On January 4, 2013, he was sworn in as Chief Justice of the Supreme Court, replacing former Chief Justice Steven W. Taylor. After serving his two-year term as Chief Justice, he returned to his former status on the Supreme Court representing the 6th Judicial District. On January 19, 2021, Colbert's retirement was announced by the Oklahoma Supreme Court, effective February 1 of the same year.

== Professional associations ==
Colbert is a member of the Tulsa Bar Association, the Oklahoma Bar Association, the American Bar Association, and the National Bar Association.

== Honors ==
- Colbert received the Tulsa Community College Service award in 2004.
- In 2005, he was inducted in the Eastern Oklahoma State College Hall of Fame, and received the Thurgood Marshall Award of Excellence and the OU Black Alumni Society—Trailblazer Award.
- In 2013, he received the Oklahoma City/ County Historical Society – Pathmaker Award and the Ada Lois Sipuel Fisher Diversity Award.
- He was recognized by the University of Oklahoma College of Law as a Distinguished Alumnus at its March 2016 Order of the Owl Hall of Fame annual ceremony.
- He was inducted into the Oklahoma Hall of Fame on November 16, 2017.

== Personal ==
Colbert is married to Dorthea (née Guion) and has three adult children. He was raised by a single mother, Edith Colbert, of Sapulpa.

During his swearing-in ceremony as chief justice in 2013, Colbert told the assembled guests that he had once considered resigning from the Oklahoma Supreme Court to pursue a more remunerative career as a private lawyer. He said that his wife and mother talked him out of the idea, saying that he would be letting down so many other people who had made sacrifices so that he could attain such an influential position.

== See also ==
- List of African American jurists

== Notes ==
Legal offices
Preceded by Daniel J. Boudreau	Associate Justice of the Oklahoma Supreme Court; 2004–2021	Succeeded by Dana Kuehn
Preceded by Steven W. Taylor	Chief Justice of the Oklahoma Supreme Court; 2013–2015	Succeeded by John F. Reif
