= John F. Reif =

American judge

Chief Justice of the Oklahoma Supreme Court
- In office January 1, 2015 – December 1, 2016
- Preceded by: Tom Colbert
- Succeeded by: Douglas L. Combs

Justice of the Oklahoma Supreme Court
- In office October 22, 2007 – April 30, 2019
- Appointed by: Brad Henry
- Preceded by: Robert E. Lavender
- Succeeded by: M. John Kane IV

Personal details
- Born: June 19, 1951 (age 75) Skiatook, Oklahoma
- Spouse: Aylo Brewer Reif (m. 1973; died 2008)
- Education: University of Tulsa

John F. Reif (born June 19, 1951) is a former justice of the Oklahoma Supreme Court, serving from 2007 until he retired in 2019. Previously, he had served for 20 years on the Oklahoma Court of Civil Appeals.

== Early life and career ==
Reif was born in Skiatook, Oklahoma, in 1951. He attended Cascia Hall Preparatory School, a Roman Catholic school in Tulsa, and graduated as valedictorian of his class in 1969. Reif earned both his bachelor's degree (in Criminal Justice) and his J.D. degree from the University of Tulsa, in 1973 and 1977, respectively.

Reif worked as a police officer in Owasso, Oklahoma, from 1973 to 1975 and as a Planner and Grants Specialist for the Law Enforcement Assistance Administration of the Indian Nations Council of Governments (INCOG) from 1974 to 1977. After finishing law school, Reif was an assistant district attorney for Tulsa County, Oklahoma, from 1978 until his appointment as a Special District Judge for Oklahoma's Fourteenth Judicial District in Tulsa County, Oklahoma, in 1981.

Reif served as a Special District Judge from 1981 to 1984, when he was appointed to the Oklahoma Court of Civil Appeals. He spent more than 20 years on that court until his appointment to the Oklahoma Supreme Court in 2007, twice serving as both Vice Chief Judge (1993 and 2001) and Chief Judge (1994 and 2002).

Throughout his time on the Court of Civil Appeals, Reif also worked as an adjunct professor of business law at Oral Roberts University.

== Supreme Court Justice ==
Reif was appointed to the Oklahoma Supreme Court by Governor Brad Henry on October 22, 2007, filling a vacancy created by the retirement of Justice Robert E. Lavender.

Reif served a two-year term as Chief Justice of the Oklahoma Supreme Court in 2015 and 2016 and was replaced in that position by Justice Douglas Combs, who had served as his Vice Chief Justice. In March 2019 Reif announced his voluntary retirement from the court, effective April 30, 2019.

== Personal life ==
Reif was married to the former Aylo Brewer for 35 years from 1973 until her death in 2008.

== Awards ==
- Oral Roberts University, President's Distinguished Service Award, 1995
- Oklahoma Bar Association (OBA), Earl Sneed Award, in recognition of annual presentations at OBA-sponsored continuing legal education and community education programs over the previous 30 years, 2010

== Professional organizations ==
- Oklahoma Bar Association, 1978 to present

Legal offices
Preceded by Robert Lavender	Justice of the Oklahoma Supreme Court; 2007-2019	Succeeded by M. John Kane IV
