= Daniel J. Boudreau =

American judge (born 1947)

Justice of the Oklahoma Supreme Court
- In office 1999–2004
- Preceded by: Robert D. Simms
- Succeeded by: Tom Colbert

Personal details
- Born: May 10, 1947 (age 79) Natick, Massachusetts

Daniel J. Boudreau (born 1947), a native of Massachusetts and a graduate of the University of Tulsa College of Law, is an Oklahoma attorney who was a justice of the Oklahoma Supreme Court from 1999 to 2004. After retiring from the Supreme Court, he is now in private practice as a specialist in Alternative Dispute Resolution, which he has also taught at the University of Tulsa College of Law.

== Early life and educational background ==
Daniel J. Boudreau was born in Natick, Massachusetts on May 10, 1947. He received his higher education at Boston College (B.A., 1969); Rutgers University (M.S.W., 1972) and University of Tulsa College of Law (J.D., 1976). He was admitted to the Oklahoma bar in 1976.

== Judicial experience ==
=== Lower courts ===
In 1990, Governor George Nigh appointed Boudreau to the Tulsa County District Court, where he spent about two years. On March 18, 1992, Governor David Walters selected Boudreau to fill a vacancy on the Oklahoma Court of Civil Appeals. Boudreau had spent the previous nine years as a District Judge in Tulsa, presiding over civil disputes.

=== Supreme Court of Oklahoma ===
Governor Frank Keating appointed Boudreau as a justice of the Oklahoma Supreme Court on October 12, 1999, replacing retiring Justice Robert Simms, who had been the previous chief justice. On November 2, 1999, Boudreau was sworn in as Chief Justice by Justice Hardy Summers. The new Chief Justice's first official act was to swear in Jerry Goodman, Boudreau's replacement as vice chief justice on the Court of Civil Appeals.

As a Supreme Court Justice, Boudreau participated on the Appellate Division of the Oklahoma Court of the Judiciary, a separate constitutional court whose role was to address judicial misconduct issues.

Justice Boudreau sent a letter of resignation to Governor Brad Henry in July 2004, the resignation was effective on September 1, 2004. In the letter, Boudreau said that he had an opportunity to teach law at his alma mater, the University of Tulsa College of Law. He also told the governor that he was considering other opportunities in the area of alternative dispute resolution. At the time, Boudreau was presiding judge of the Sixth Judicial District, which covered Tulsa County.

== Dispute resolution consulting ==
In 2005, Boudreau joined Dispute Resolution Consultants (DRC), where he remains at present. He had been specifically interested in this area before retiring from the court, having earned a Mediator's certificate in 2003 and an Alternative Dispute Resolution Certificate in 2004 from the National Judicial College.

In 2016, Boudreau was retained to arbitrate a dispute between the Citizen Tribe Potowatami (CTP) and the state of Oklahoma. The dispute arose in 2014, when the Potowatami nation claimed $27 million in state tax exemptions for an 8.5 percent sales tax on alcoholic drinks served to its casino patrons who were not members of the tribe. After auditing the CPT, the state revoked alcoholic beverage permits for both of CPN's casinos and threatened to close the casinos, as well as other tribal businesses for failing to report all sales tax receipts. Bordeau, then with the American Arbitration Association, ruled in favor of CTP, saying that the state could not collect the taxes in question. Oklahoma immediately appealed to the 10th Circuit Court, claiming that the arbitration itself was an error and asking that the lower court's judgment be overturned.

On October 5, 2017, the Oklahoma Bar Association (OBA) Alternative Dispute Resolution Section presented Boudreau with its first Peter Bradford Award for Distinguished Achievement in Alternative Dispute Resolution.

== Professional affiliations ==
- National Academy of Distinguished Neutrals (NADN);
- Oklahoma Supreme Court Standing Committee to Monitor, Update and Revise the Oklahoma Civil Jury Instructions;
- American Inns of Court - Hudson-Hall Wheaton Chapter;
- Alumni Association of the University of Tulsa College of Law;
- Legal Services of Eastern Oklahoma.
- Oklahoma Bar Association

== Personal and family life ==
Daniel Boudreau (or Danny, as he was known during his college days) met Faith in the library elevator at Rutgers University on an October night in 1970, when both were 23 years old. After talking for a few hours that night, Faith said in a subsequent interview that she called her mother that night and told her that she had just met the man she wanted to marry. Faith said she and Danny began dating steadily the next day, but waited two years before marrying.

In 1973, the couple moved to Tulsa, where Daniel enrolled in the University of Tulsa Law School. They have lived in Oklahoma ever since and have two children, one boy and one girl, who were born in Oklahoma. The Boudreau family kept their home in Tulsa even while Daniel worked at jobs in Oklahoma City and commuted to Tulsa every weekend. Faith looked after the children and worked as a school counselor during the week. In 2003, she was diagnosed with Stage IV non-Hodgkin’s lymphoma. Having this illness led her to become a co-founder of "...Celebrating the Art of Healing, an annual educational symposium for cancer survivors, their caregivers, adult family members and others,”
