= Alma Wilson =

American judge

Justice of the Oklahoma Supreme Court
- In office February 17, 1982 – July 27, 1999
- Appointed by: George Nigh
- Preceded by: Ben T. Williams
- Succeeded by: James R. Winchester

Personal details
- Born: Alma Dorothy Bell; May 25, 1917 Pauls Valley, Oklahoma
- Died: July 27, 1999 (aged 82) Oklahoma City, Oklahoma
- Spouse: William Allan Wilson (m. 1948)
- Occupation: attorney, judge
- Known for: First woman justice on the Oklahoma Supreme Court

Alma Dorothy Bell Wilson (May 25, 1917 – July 27, 1999) was an Oklahoma attorney who was appointed as the second female district judge in the state of Oklahoma in 1975. In 1982, she was elevated as the first woman to serve on the Oklahoma Supreme Court and between 1995 and 1997 was the first woman chief justice. Wilson was honored by many awards in her lifetime including induction into the Oklahoma Women's Hall of Fame, the Oklahoma Hall of Fame and was named Appellate Judge of the Year in both 1986 and 1989.

== Early life ==
Alma Bell and her twin sister Wilma were born on May 25, 1917, in Pauls Valley, Oklahoma to Anna and William R. Bell. From age eight, Bell had decided to become a lawyer and after graduating as valedictorian of the class of 1935 from Pauls Valley High School, she attended Principia College in Elsah, Illinois, completing her BA degree. Bell then attended Oklahoma City University where she obtained her Bachelor of Laws before enrolling at the University of Oklahoma College of Law. She was one of six women in a class of 100 students, who graduated with a Juris Doctor in 1941.

== Career ==
After law school, Bell returned to Pauls Valley and began her practice as a tax attorney. After World War II ended, she met a veteran, who was also a practicing attorney in Pauls Valley. She and Bill Wilson married in 1948 and had their daughter Lee Ann in 1951. After taking a few years to raise Lee Ann and earn her pilot's license, Wilson returned to the court in 1960 with an eye to pursuing a judgeship. Her first appointment was as a municipal judge in Pauls Valley, but she also continued to practice law in both Oklahoma City and Pauls Valley.

In 1969, when the Oklahoma Court System was reorganized and both county judges and justices of the peace were abolished in favor of a district trial system, Wilson was appointed as the Special Judge in charge of minor cases for Garvin County. In 1975, she was appointed as the second woman District Judge in the state, when Governor David Boren appointed her to serve for the 21st District, encompassing Cleveland, Garvin, and McClain Counties. Judge Margaret Lamm McCalister, of Tulsa County was the first female district judge and simultaneously with Wilson's appointment, Judge Patricia M. Hoebel was appointed for District 15, which included Pawnee and part of Tulsa Counties. Wilson also served on the Court of Tax Review for six years and was an appointee by the governor to the Commission on the Status of Women.

Wilson was appointed by Governor George Nigh in 1982 as the first woman justice on the Oklahoma Supreme Court, becoming the first female chief justice in the state in 1995. She served until 1997 as chief justice and also served the presiding judge of the Appellate jurisdiction of the judiciary. Though she was involved in many notable cases, like the Southwestern Bell rate refund case, legislative appropriations and school funding, one of Wilson's special interests was juvenile justice. In 1998, she co-founded the Seeworth Preparatory Academy in Oklahoma City to help 6th- through 9th-graders, overcome issues like poverty or dysfunctional family situations which impact children's ability to learn. Wilson died after a short illness at her home in Oklahoma City, on July 27, 1999.

== Legacy ==
Wilson received numerous awards and honors both during her lifetime and posthumously. In 1974, she received the Guy Brown Award to recognize outstanding alumni from the University of Oklahoma and the following year inducted into the OU Hall of Fame. She was inducted into the Oklahoma Women's Hall of Fame in 1983 for her service as president of the Oklahoma Association of Women Lawyers, as well as her appointment to the Oklahoma Supreme Court. Wilson was recognized with the Pioneer Woman award in 1985 and named Appellate Judge of the Year in both 1986 and 1989. In 1994, she was named Woman of the Year and in 1996 she was inducted into the Oklahoma Hall of Fame. The Oklahoma Bar Association annually awards the Alma Bell Wilson citation to bar members who have made contributions to improve children's lives. In 2001, Bob Burke and Louise Painter published Justice Served: The Life of Alma Bell Wilson, the biography of Wilson's life.

== See also ==
- List of female state supreme court justices
