= Travis Jett =

American judge (born 1984)

Justice of the Oklahoma Supreme Court
- Incumbent
- Assumed office April 14, 2025
- Appointed by: Kevin Stitt
- Preceded by: Yvonne Kauger

Personal details
- Born: November 1, 1984 (age 42) Slapout, Oklahoma, U.S.
- Party: Republican
- Education: Oklahoma State University, Stillwater (BA); Georgetown University (JD)

Travis V. Jett is an American attorney and judge who has served on the Oklahoma Supreme Court since 2025.

== Early life and career ==
Travis Jett grew up in Slapout, Oklahoma, and graduated from Laverne Public Schools. While attending Oklahoma State University, he served as the Future Farmers of America state and national president. After graduating from Oklahoma State, he attended Georgetown University Law Center where he was the editor in chief of the Georgetown Journal of Law and Public Policy from 2010 to 2011.

Jett started his legal career interning for Crowe & Dunlevy and later worked for Fellers Snider, GableGotwals, and the Hodgden Law Firm. He is a member of the Republican Party.

== Oklahoma Supreme Court ==
Jett was appointed to the Oklahoma Supreme Court by Governor Kevin Stitt on April 14, 2025, to succeed Yvonne Kauger.

Legal offices
| Preceded by Yvonne Kauger | Justice of the Oklahoma Supreme Court; 2025–present | Incumbent |
