= James Waddey Clark =

American judge (1877–1939)

Justice of the Oklahoma Supreme Court
- In office 1924–1933
- Preceded by: F. L. Warren
- Succeeded by: Orel Busby

Personal details
- Born: December 8, 1877 Allisona, Williamson County, Tennessee
- Died: February 24, 1939 (aged 61) Denison, Texas

James Waddey "J.W." Clark (December 8, 1877 – February 24, 1939) was a justice of the Oklahoma Supreme Court from 1925 to 1933. He was born in Allisona, Williamson County, Tennessee to Joseph Poindexter and Cora Belle Waddey. After finishing public school, James became a traveling salesman, then went into the mercantile business, and finally went into business for himself. He took a course in law in 1907 and 1908, then enrolled in Cumberland University (Lebanon, Tennessee) in 1909. (Note: Although Thoburn's account is not specific on the details, it suggests that James Clark graduated from Cumberland with a law degree and almost immediately moved to Oklahoma. However, Harlow's version of Clark's biography states that he came to Oklahoma in 1906, initially settled in Atoka, Oklahoma, then received his LL B degree from Cumberland in 1909. He then spent four years in Caney, Oklahoma (1909-1912)) By 1910, he had opened a law practice and won election to the Oklahoma legislature. (Note: Thoburn states that Judge Clark was one of several prospective lawyers that trained under Judge John Linebaugh in Atoka, Oklahoma and who went on to great success in their legal careers.) In 1912, he was elected County Attorney for Atoka County, Oklahoma and was reelected after his first two-year term expired. In 1917, he returned to private law practice in Atoka, where he remained until he won election to the Oklahoma Supreme Court in 1924, filling a vacancy and taking office in 1925. He was reelected for a full 6-year term in 1926.

In 1929, the Oklahoma House impeached Clark, passing eleven articles of impeachment against Clark alleging corruption. However, in his Impeachment trial, he was acquitted by one vote in the Oklahoma Senate, and served out the remainder of his term. After returning to private practice for a time, Clark again ran for a seat on the court in 1938, but was not elected.

== Personal and family life ==
Justice Clark married Anna Paullin in Durant, Oklahoma on May 1, 1917. They had four children: Ann Virginia (b. September 27, 1917); Jim (b. November 6, 1920); Mary Louise (b. October 1, 1924); John Marshall (b. October 12, 1926).

Clark died in Denison, Texas, where he had been hospitalized for a kidney ailment.
