= Orel Busby =

American lawyer (1890–1965)

Justice of the Oklahoma Supreme Court
- In office 1933–1937
- Preceded by: James Waddey Clark
- Succeeded by: D. N. Davidson

Personal details
- Born: February 6, 1890 Batesville, Arkansas
- Died: 1965 Oklahoma City
- Occupation: Teacher, Attorney, Judge

Orel Busby (1890-1965) was an American lawyer. He was born in Batesville, Arkansas on February 6, 1890. He arrived in Indian Territory communities of Allen and Ada with his parents when he was about 10 years old, and finally settled in the community of Konawa, Oklahoma. His parents were G. C. Busby and E.C. (née Pegg). The father was reportedly a native of Alabama and a very successful farmer and rancher after moving to Indian Territory in 1901. He later quit farming and ranching to open a mercantile business at Allen. Harlow wrote that Orel Busby was born in Batesville, Arkansas, and that he lived in Allen from 1901 to 1906 and in Konowa from 1906 to 1912. (Note: Thoburn's History of Oklahoma, however said that the Busby family moved from Arkansas to Indian Territory when the boy was less than one year old (i.e. 1889).)

== Education and early career in teaching ==
Thoburn added that Busby entered high school at Ada, then moved to Konawa, where he graduated from high school. Busby attended the University of Oklahoma (OU) for two years, then transferred to East Central Normal School at Ada, Oklahoma. (Note: East Central Normal School, then simply a teacher's college, later became East Central University.) In 1910, he graduated and was hired as a school principal in Konawa. During the school term, he was elected both justice of the peace and mayor of Konawa, Oklahoma. He then began teaching in Seminole County schools, and was serving as principal of the Konawa school, when he was admitted to the bar in 1913, decided to return to OU and graduated with the LLB degree in 1914.

== Career in law ==
In 1911, while still a student at OU, Busby organized a number of students into a Democratic Club, and was elected president. This was considered the first meeting of the future organization, League of Young Democrats (LYD) in America. A group of these members attended the 1912 Democratic State Party convention, which received official status from the party. Busby was also elected President of the LYD.

Busby was elected as Pontotoc County, Oklahoma Judge in 1916. His term expired in 1920. He then served as District Judge from 1926 to 1932. Governor William H. Murray appointed Busby as Associate Justice of the Oklahoma State Supreme Court in 1932, representing Judicial District 8 and succeeding Justice James W. Clark. Busby resigned in 1937 and was replaced on the court by Denver Davison. He also served as a member of the Oklahoma University Board of Regents in 1926–27.

According to his biography at the Oklahoma Hall of Fame, Busby died in 1965.

== Organizations ==
Busby was a member of:

- Ada Commercial Club
- Knights of Pythias Lodge of Konawa
- Elks Lodge of Ada
- Pontotoc County State Bar Association
- Oklahoma State Bar Association
- American Bar Association
- University of Oklahoma Board of Regents
- President, Oklahoma Heritage Foundation (now the Oklahoma Hall of Fame).

== Additional sources ==
- Thoburn, Joseph B. A Standard History of Oklahoma.vol. 3, p. 1054. American Historical Society. Chicago and New York. 1916. Available on Google Books.
