= Leedey, Oklahoma =

- Town
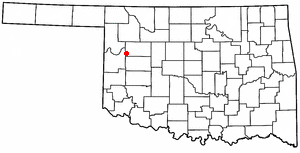
- Location of Leedey, Oklahoma
- Coordinates: 35°52′07″N 99°20′42″W
- Country: United States
- State: Oklahoma
- County: Dewey

Area
  - Total: 0.45 sq mi (1.17 km^{2})
  - Land: 0.45 sq mi (1.17 km^{2})
  - Water: 0 sq mi (0.00 km^{2})
- Elevation: 2,057 ft (627 m)

Population (2020)
  - Total: 415
  - Density: 922.2/sq mi (356.05/km^{2})
- Time zone: UTC-6 (Central (CST))
  - Summer (DST): UTC-5 (CDT)
- ZIP code: 73654
- Area code: 580
- FIPS code: 40-42050
- GNIS feature ID: 2412886

Leedey is a town in Dewey County, Oklahoma, United States. The population was 415 at the 2020 census.

== History ==
The town was named for Amos Leedey, an early settler. The post office opened January 6, 1900, with Amos Leedey as the first postmaster. Leedey became a railroad town when the Wichita Falls and Northwestern Railway (later part of the Missouri, Kansas and Texas Railroad) completed a line in from Elk City in 1911, and the town incorporated that same year. Both petroleum and agriculture contributed to the town’s growth.

On May 31, 1947, Leedey was hit by an F5 tornado. The tornado killed 7 people and heavily damaged the town.

== Geography ==
Leedey is located approximately 34 miles north of Interstate 40 at Exit 41, the Elk City turnoff, via Oklahoma State Highway 34.

According to the United States Census Bureau, the town has a total area of 0.4 square miles (1.0 km^{2}), all land.

== Demographics ==
Historical population
Census	Pop.	Note	%±
1920	468		—
1930	646		38.0%
1940	574		−11.1%
1950	558		−2.8%
1960	451		−19.2%
1970	465		3.1%
1980	499		7.3%
1990	468		−6.2%
2000	345		−26.3%
2010	435		26.1%
2020	415		−4.6%
U.S. Decennial Census

=== 2020 census ===
As of the 2020 census, Leedey had a population of 415. The median age was 39.5 years. 26.0% of residents were under the age of 18 and 14.5% of residents were 65 years of age or older. For every 100 females there were 100.5 males, and for every 100 females age 18 and over there were 106.0 males age 18 and over.

0.0% of residents lived in urban areas, while 100.0% lived in rural areas.

There were 153 households in Leedey, of which 35.3% had children under the age of 18 living in them. Of all households, 62.1% were married-couple households, 17.6% were households with a male householder and no spouse or partner present, and 16.3% were households with a female householder and no spouse or partner present. About 26.1% of all households were made up of individuals and 11.1% had someone living alone who was 65 years of age or older.

There were 220 housing units, of which 30.5% were vacant. The homeowner vacancy rate was 11.9% and the rental vacancy rate was 17.3%.

Racial composition as of the 2020 census
Race	Number	Percent
White	353	85.1%
Black or African American	0	0.0%
American Indian and Alaska Native	24	5.8%
Asian	0	0.0%
Native Hawaiian and Other Pacific Islander	0	0.0%
Some other race	3	0.7%
Two or more races	35	8.4%
Hispanic or Latino (of any race)	29	7.0%

== Notable people ==
- Darla Hood of the "Our Gang" series was born in Leedey on November 4, 1931.
- Pat Irwin (1921–1999), Justice of the Oklahoma State Supreme Court.
