= Ben T. Williams =

American judge (1910–1982)

- Born: January 20, 1911; Grandview, Texas
- Died: January 11, 1982 (aged 70); Oklahoma City, Oklahoma
- Occupations: Attorney, Judge
- Years active: 1934 – 1982

Ben T. Williams (January 20, 1911 – January 11, 1982) was a justice of the Oklahoma Supreme Court from 1953 to 1982. He served as chief justice twice, in 1961-62 and in 1975–76. He lived in Oklahoma City, and also maintained a home in Pauls Valley, Oklahoma.

== Life and career ==
The son of John Thorald Williams and Lela Alvia Moore, Ben Thompson Williams was born in Grandview, Texas on January 20, 1911. He later moved to Garvin County, Oklahoma. He earned a bachelor's degree from the University of Oklahoma, then earned his law degree from the University of Oklahoma College of Law. (Note: A May 1935 article from Sooner Magazine shows Ben T. Williams received his undergraduate degree in 1931, and his graduate degree in 1933.) After receiving his law degree, he became the city attorney for Stratford, Oklahoma, then became the Garvin County judge for four years. He was elected District Judge in 1938, a position he held for 14 years, before he was appointed Associate Justice of the Oklahoma Supreme Court in 1952, and served two terms as chief justice. He also was a part-time instructor at the Oklahoma City University School of Law.

Williams was on the bench when an infamous corruption scandal broke in July 1964. A U.S. attorney alleged that he had a witness who had witnessed a payoff of Oklahoma Supreme Court justices in 1957. The Oklahoma Bar Association investigated the allegation, and completely exonerated Williams and six other justices. Disciplinary action was recommended against two other justices.

Williams had announced in December 1981 that he would retire on January 31, 1982, but died on January 11, 1982. He had been hospitalized for 48 days at Baptist Medical Center in Oklahoma City. He was survived by his widow, Ruth, and son, Ben T. Williams Jr.

Williams' widow, Ruth T. Williams (née Turner) died on June 23, 1991, in Dallas, Texas. Her obituary named her surviving son and daughter-in-law, Ben Jr. and Jane Williams, and three grandsons, as well as another son, Laurence Thompson Williams, who had predeceased her.

== Notes ==
Political offices
Preceded by	Justice; 1953–1982	Succeeded by Alma Wilson
