= American Indian Law Review =

- Discipline: Legal studies
- Language: English
- Edited by: J. Santana Spangler-Day

Publication details
- History: 1973-present
- Publisher: University of Oklahoma College of Law (United States)
- Frequency: Biannually

Standard abbreviations
- Bluebook: Am. Indian L. R.
- ISO 4: Am. Indian Law Rev.

Indexing
- ISSN: 0094-002X
- JSTOR: 0094002X

Links
- Journal homepage

The American Indian Law Review (AILR) is a student-run biannual law review affiliated with the University of Oklahoma College of Law. The American Indian Law Review serves as a nationwide scholarly forum for analysis of developments in legal issues pertaining to Native Americans and Indigenous peoples worldwide.

AILR circulates in-depth articles by legal scholars, attorneys and other expert observers. In addition, AILR provides comments and notes written by student members and editors on a variety of Indian law-related topics.

Every spring AILR hosts one of the nation's largest symposia on Native American law, often in partnership with the University of Oklahoma's Native American studies department and the Native American Law Students Association.

AILR also hosts an annual American Indian Law Writing Competition for law students that are enrolled in any American Bar Association accredited law school in the United States and Canada. The article winning first place is published in the review and the top three entries receive cash prizes.

AILR was founded in 1973 by students. Approximately 50 OU Law students participate in AILR each academic year.
