= Rebecca Cryer =

Native American attorney from Oklahoma, U.S. (1946–2020)

Rebecca Alice Cryer (née Schoemann; October 9, 1946 – September 29, 2020) was a Native American attorney, tribal officer, and Oklahoma judge who survived the bombing of the Alfred P. Murrah Federal Building in 1995.

== Early life and education ==
Born Rebecca Alice Schoemann in Shawnee, Oklahoma, Cryer was a citizen of the Citizen Potawatomi Nation. She was raised in the small town of Wanette, Oklahoma, where she met David Cryer while in high school; they married when she was 18. Due to her husband's military service, they moved frequently for the first several years of their marriage, but then settled in Norman, Oklahoma. Cryer received her undergraduate degree from the University of Oklahoma in 1973, followed by a J.D. from the University of Oklahoma College of Law in 1977. She passed the bar examination that same year, and served as the Tribal Administrator for the Citizen Potawatomi Nation from 1977 to 1978.

== Legal and judicial career ==
Cryer became an Assistant District Attorney for Cleveland and McClain Counties in 1982, and a trial attorney in the Enforcement Division of the Oklahoma Department of Securities in 1989. While working in that position on April 19, 1995, she was in a building across the street from the Alfred P. Murrah Federal Building on the day of the Oklahoma City bombing. The building she was in was caught in the blast, and Cryer was seriously injured, with cuts requiring 100 stitches and dust inhalation that required her to be re-hospitalized several days after the incident. Due to Cryer's injuries, her husband had to close his caramel corn shop at the Sooner Fashion Mall; he later worked in the clerk's office of the Cleveland County District Court.

In October 2015, Chief Gary Batton of the Choctaw Nation of Oklahoma appointed Cryer Special District Judge of the Choctaw Nation District Court, where Cryer remained until her death.

== Death ==
Cryer contracted COVID-19 in September 2020, during the COVID-19 pandemic in Oklahoma. Despite this, she continued working on cases from her hospital bed. She died a week before turning 74, and was survived by her husband and their two sons and one daughter. Following her death, flags were flown at half-staff across the Choctaw Nation in Oklahoma.
