= Oklahoma Judicial Center =

- Oklahoma Historical Society Building
- U.S. National Register of Historic Places
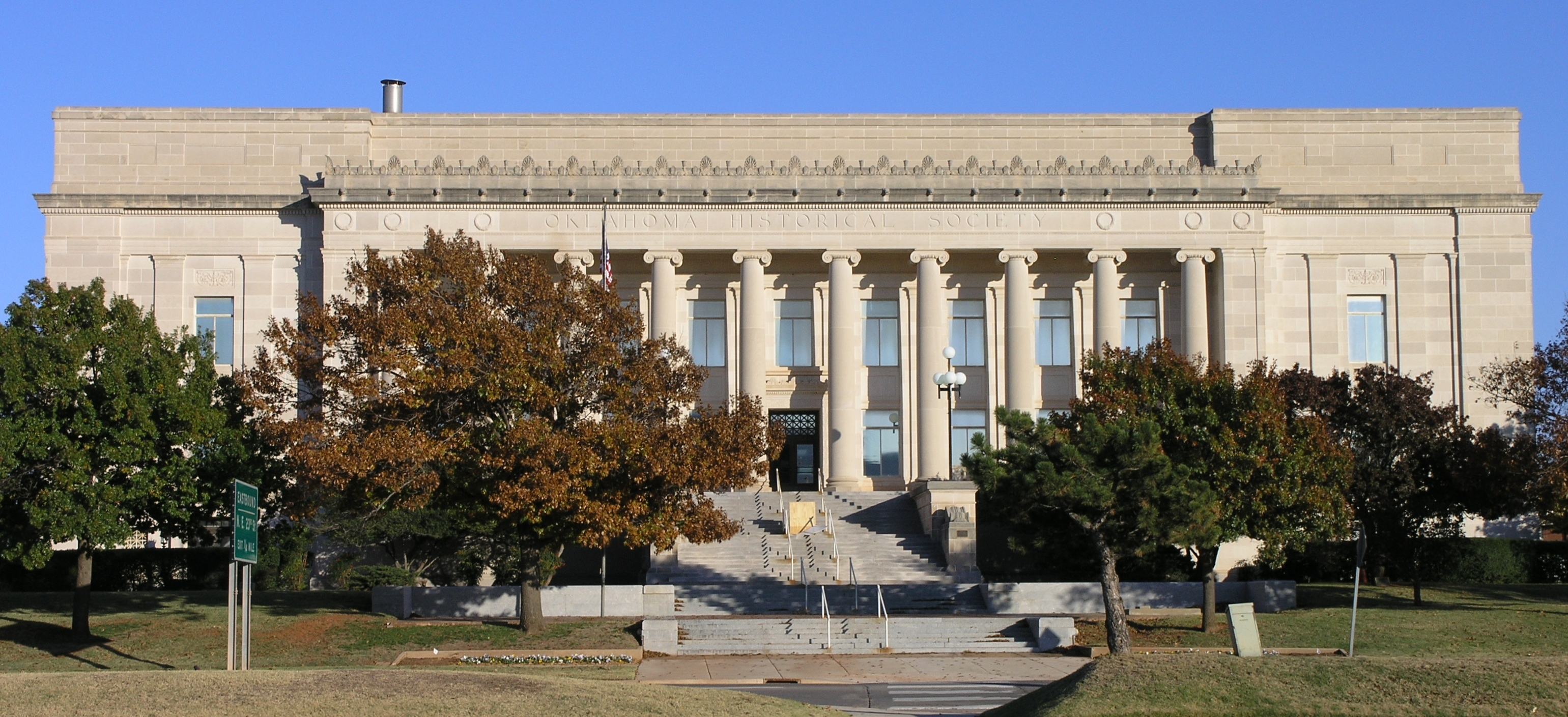
- Oklahoma Historical Society Building in 2006

- Location within Oklahoma Location within the United States
- Location: 2100 N. Lincoln Blvd. Oklahoma City, Oklahoma
- Coordinates: 35°29′25″N 97°30′7″W
- Area: 3.4 acres (1.4 ha)
- Built: 1929-1930
- Built by: Holmboe Construction Co.
- Architect: Layton, Hicks & Forsyth
- Architectural style: Classical Revival
- NRHP reference No.: 90000124
- Added to NRHP: February 21, 1990

The Oklahoma Judicial Center is the headquarters of the Oklahoma Supreme Court, the Oklahoma Court of Criminal Appeals, and the Judiciary of Oklahoma. Situated near the Oklahoma State Capitol, the original structure, designed by the architectural firm Layton, Hicks & Forsyth, was built between 1929-1930 as the home of the Oklahoma Historical Society and was listed on the National Register of Historic Places as the Oklahoma Historical Society Building in 1990. The society moved to the nearby Oklahoma History Center when it opened in 2005. An annex was completed in 2011.

== Description ==
The Oklahoma Judicial Center comprises the 68,156-square-foot (6,331.9 m^{2}) former Oklahoma Historical Society Building, also known as the Wiley Post Historical Building, and a newer 77,362-square-foot (7,187.2 m^{2}) adjacent annex located on the Capitol Park grounds of the Oklahoma State Capitol complex giving the center a combined floor space of 145,518 square feet (13,519.1 m^{2}). The Judicial Center occupies a 3.4-acre (1.4 ha) lot bound between N. Lincoln Blvd. to the west and N. Lindsay Ave. to the east from NE 19th St. to NE 21st St. The Judicial Center annex is immediately adjacent facing N. Lindsay Ave. The Oklahoma State Capitol is located across N. Lincoln Blvd. to the northwest. The center is bounded to the south and east by the Capitol-Lincoln Terrace Historic District located across N. Lindsay Ave. and NE 19th St.

=== Exterior ===
The original Historical Society Building is a three-story structure with a full basement. The exterior features a facade of Indiana limestone with the base and steps composed of Georgia granite designed in Classical Revival style. The building is elevated six feet above Lincoln Blvd. which runs in front of the main entrance. Ten two-story tapered columns with Ionic capitals are aligned along the front facade between two square limestone end columns. The columns uphold an entablature inscribed with Oklahoma Historical Society in the center with three wreathes, symbolic of academic buildings, on each side. Above these along the lower edge of the cornice are dentils combined with egg and dart moulding as part of a frieze that includes lion masks. Atop the entablature lies the antefix featuring floral anthemions, one of the building's common motifs.

A shallow porch with a beamed ceiling lies behind the Ionic columns. A porch rail is composed of short stone balustrades connecting the columns. Opposite the stairs leading to the porch are two centrally placed bronze entrance doors with a decorative iron grille clerestory. Alongside the entrance are vertical stone relief panels supporting an entablature and antefix resembling those on the front facade. Floral medallions alternate with vertebrate leaf bands to decorate the relief panels. From the porch, the granite steps descend in two wide flights separated by a small brick plaza. Three-dimensional volutes are on each side of the lower flight.

Bays extend from the north and south ends of the building. The single, steel casement windows on the first and second floors alternate with plain stone pilasters along all elevations. On the front elevation, an intricate medallion design is located above first floor windows while second floor windows are adorned above with a scrolling foliage design. Windows on the side elevations are not decorated. Around the building is a belt course composed of a single row of dentils. On the front facade, each wing holds secondary entrances designed as simpler versions of the main entrance. These entrances are topped with simple entablatures with dentils and have windows on each side with exterior grilles resembling the clerestory over the main entrance. Light fixtures on each side of the secondary entrances complement the grilles and anthemions. The building's cornerstone is located on the northwest corner. The rear facade of the original building holds multi-pane windows larger than those along the other elevations.

=== Interior ===
A dominant interior feature of the Historical Society Building is the asymmetric central marble staircase and an intricate iron balustrade. The interior holds plaster walls decorated with elaborate friezes and parquet floors of marble, oak, and walnut. The halls of each of the unique floors are adorned with plaster pilasters with elaborate capitals and decorative friezes. These long corridors are laid with patterned marble with borders. The marble is added to the walls approximately a foot high as floor molding. The marble stairs have marble wainscotting on all levels. The stairway's iron balustrade incorporates a scrolling foliage design and a walnut banister. This foliage design at every level wraps a marble newel post. Despite the building's Neoclassical style, Art Deco light fixtures are employed at all levels. Seventeen- by seventeen-foot light courts illuminate the halls and service rooms of the upper floors and the former first floor library room.

The basement contains beamed, coffered ceilings pronounced with dentils and a repeated vertical anthemion pattern. This level also is accented with intricate friezes, marble floors, and oak doors holding leaded oval glass and leaded clerestories. Located within the basement is a 400-seat auditorium including a stage decorated with swags and a false entablature, walls adorned with classical motifs, and large Art Deco chandeliers.

Within the bronze main entrance doors are a second pair of brass-trimmed wooden doors with a stained glass Art Deco clerestory. In between these two door sets is a small entry vestibule laid with Tennessee and Tavernelle marble floors. The vestibule includes a frieze decorated with a scrolling foliage design and dentils. On the first floor between the vestibule and the central stairway is a reception area topped with an arched, vaulted ceiling. The pilastered first floor hallway features a frieze incorporating a wavescroll.

On the second floor, the hall has beamed ceilings and pilasters capped with flattened Corinthian capitals. This floor has the most elaborate frieze composed of plaster festoons with a ribbon-wrapped design of leaves and flowers. This hallway is also adorned with egg and dart molding, dentils, and a secondary Art Deco design.

The third floor hallway holds a plain beamed ceiling and pilasters with Corinthian capitals similar to those on the second floor. A special feature of the third floor is the wall paintings of eight Native American figures, the works by Kiowa artists Monroe Tsatoke and Spencer Asah, funded in the 1930s by the Civil Works Administration. The artists, members of the Kiowa Six, contributed their art to several state and federal buildings in Oklahoma. The third floor was originally constructed to be utilized as gallery space with the ceilings, holding skylights, curved to meet the walls. A small metal staircase on the south end of the hall climbs upward toward mechanical space.

=== Surrounding grounds ===
The front lawn of the building near the main entrance stairway holds a replica of the Liberty Bell, a cannon, and the architectural relic of a previously demolished downtown building. To the north of the original building is the Oklahoma American Legion War Memorial. This memorial features an eternal flame and four separate sculptures honoring veterans of World War I, World War II, the Korean War, and the Vietnam War.

== History ==
The Oklahoma Historical Society, previously located since 1917 within the Capitol building, faced increasing competition for space in the Capitol from its own growth and that of other state agencies. Robert L. Williams, a judge and former state governor, promoted a bill in the Oklahoma Legislature to fund a new building for the society. Gov. William J. Holloway approved the legislation on March 1, 1929 resulting in construction commencing before the year ended. Under the new law, $500,000 was allocated for the construction of the building funded from the sale of school lands in the former Cherokee Outlet. Williams became chairman of the Building Committee tasked with selecting architectural and construction firms. After touring several cities around the country, the committee selected the Minnesota Historical Society Building in Saint Paul as a prototype.

During the committee's fact-finding national tour, the committee was accompanied by architect Solomon Andrew Layton whose firm, Layton, Hicks & Forsyth, served as the building's architect as well as for several other properties on the National Register including the nearby Capitol building. Holmboe Construction Co. built the structure under the supervision of Edward P. Boyd. Construction was completed in 1930.

Decorative lighting was installed around 1960 at the top of the front entrance steps on each side. Exhibit structures formerly on the property during the historical society's tenure included a capped oil well and other petroleum industry artifacts also installed around 1960 and an exhibit shop put in place in 1982. The war memorial site was dedicated on November 11, 1969 with the memorial constructed in 1986. The building's auditorium underwent restoration in 1982-1983.

The Oklahoma Historical Society Building was added to the National Register of Historic Places (NRHP) on February 21, 1990. Resources listed within the NRHP registration include the building itself as the sole contributing property while the non-extant exhibit shed and oil well were non-contributing resources. The registration's statement of significance cites the building's long-time role as a repository of the state's history and as an important example of the architectural works of Layton, Hicks & Forsyth.

The Oklahoma Historical Society relocated to the Oklahoma History Center in 2005. In 2011, following a $35 million program involving the historic rehabilitation of the original building and the construction of the adjacent annex designed by TAP Architecture, the building reopened as the Oklahoma Judicial Center.

== See also ==
- National Register of Historic Places listings in Oklahoma County, Oklahoma
