= Don Barnes (judge) =

American attorney and judge

Justice of the Oklahoma Supreme Court
- In office 1972–1985
- Preceded by: W. H. Blackbird
- Succeeded by: Hardy Summers

Personal details
- Born: W. Don Barnes; December 25, 1924 Tulsa, Oklahoma
- Died: March 3, 2011 (aged 86)

Don Barnes (1924–2011) was a long-time attorney and judge in Oklahoma. Born in Tulsa, he first became a judge in 1954, when he was elected superior court judge in Okmulgee, Oklahoma. He was given the nickname "The Praying Judge," because he began each court session over which he presided with a prayer. In 1972, Oklahoma Governor David Hall appointed him as an associate justice of the state supreme court. Barnes remained on the court until he retired as chief justice in January 1985.

== Early years ==
Barnes was born to Smith and Ann Barnes in Tulsa on December 25, 1924. He was raised in that city and graduated from Central High School in 1942, after which he enrolled in the University of Oklahoma (OU), where he intended to major in engineering. He also joined the Naval Reserve. Eighteen months later he was activated to full-time duty and assigned to the naval base at Guantanamo Bay, Cuba.

After WWII ended, Barnes returned to OU in 1946, and resumed his studies in engineering. An avid fan of the Sooner football team, he soon met a like-minded coed named Jean Merrill. Their first date was for an OU football game. They married on July 26, 1946, five days after he received his formal discharge papers from the Navy. (Note: Jean happened to be the daughter of OU law professor Maurice Merrill and his wife, Orpha, both of whom are OU alumni ('19) and ('54). respectively.) Barnes changed his major from engineering to law, and received his degree from OU in 1949.

== Career ==
After his graduation, Barnes and his wife moved to Sulphur, Oklahoma, where he opened a private law practice. (Note: His wife also began her teaching career in Sulphur.) In 1951, he became the county attorney of Murray County, Oklahoma. Two years later, they moved to Okmulgee, Oklahoma, where he again established a private practice. He was also elected judge of the superior court, being reelected until 1972. He opened the first session with a prayer, and continued the practice as long as he held the office. He was soon known by the nickname "the Praying Judge".

=== Supreme Court Service ===
In 1972, then governor David Hall named Barnes as an associate justice of the Oklahoma State Supreme Court. The judge remained on the court for the next 30 years. Shortly after his appointment, Barnes and his family moved to Edmond, Oklahoma, where they would live until after his death in 2011.

Barnes became quite notable in 1984, when he intervened in a legal action against Wagoner County Associate District Judge, Paul E. Simmons. A number of complaints had been filed against Judge Simmons for his unprofessional behavior towards defendants and other individuals who happened in to be in his courtroom. Justice Barnes, offended by these behaviors, filed a petition with the state Court on the Judiciary, seeking Simmons' removal from his position. Barnes also requested the immediate suspension of Judge Simmons until the Judiciary Court could decide on the appropriate punishment.

Justice Barnes was vice-president of the Council of State Court Representatives for the National Center for State Courts and served on its board of directors from 1972 until his retirement from the Supreme Court.

=== Post Supreme Court ===
Barnes retired from the Supreme Court in 1985, but soon became "of counsel" with the Stack and Barnes law firm. Robert Barnes, the junior partner in the firm, was the elder Barnes' nephew. Don Barnes retired from private practice in 1992, and became active as a retired judge, as director of the Oklahoma Supreme Court Settlement Conference, and as an arbitrator. Meantime, he earned his 50-year membership pin in the Oklahoma Bar Association. Fully retired, Barnes spent much of his time at the Oak Tree Country Club, where he was named a marshal.

=== Civic and professional activities ===
- President of the Okmulgee Junior Chamber of Commerce
- President of the United Fund for Okmulgee
- President of the Okmulgee Recreation Council
- Board of Directors of the OU Alumni Association
- Board of Directors of Spanish Cove Retirement Village, Yukon, OK
- President of the Judicial Conference of Oklahoma
- President of the Okmulgee County Bar Association
- Presiding judge of the East Central Administrative District
- Presiding judge of the Appellate Division, Court on the Judiciary
- Member of the Phi Alpha Delta legal fraternity
- Member of the Phi Kappa Psi social fraternity

== Death and survivors ==
Judge Don Barnes died on March 3, 2011. He was survived by his wife, Jean, a son, Brent (whose wife was named Brenda), who lived in Norman, Oklahoma; another son, Ron (whose wife was named Debbie), who lived in Tulsa; a daughter, Beth (who was married to Steve Hall and lived in Edmond). (Note: Ron's wife had also become a well-known attorney and served as a judge of the Oklahoma Court of Civil Appeals.) Don and Jean also had seven grandchildren and five great grandchildren. Don was also survived by one brother, Jerry Barnes, who lived in Michigan with his wife Michelle. His other brother, Bill, had predeceased Don. A memorial service was held on March 11, 2011, at the First Christian Church, Disciples of Christ, in Edmond, in which Don and Jean had been very active since they moved to Edmond. (Don Barnes had served as an elder in this church.)

== See also ==
- Deborah Barnes
