= Rooney McInerney =

American judge (1930–1978)

Chief Justice of the Oklahoma Supreme Court
- In office 1966–1972

Justice of the Oklahoma Supreme Court

Personal details
- Born: May 20, 1930
- Died: May 1, 1978 (aged 47) Oklahoma City, Oklahoma

Rooney McInerney (May 20, 1930 – May 1, 1978) was an American judge who served as Justice of the Oklahoma Supreme Court, serving from 1966 until 1972.
