= University of Oklahoma College of Law =

Law school in Norman, Oklahoma, US

Coordinates: 35°11′46″N 97°26′47″W

- Motto: Ministri iuris fideles
- Established: 1909
- School type: Public law school
- Dean: Anna Carpenter
- Location: Norman, Oklahoma, USA
- Enrollment: 509
- Faculty: 31 (full-time)
- USNWR ranking: 51st (2024)
- Bar pass rate: 95%
- Website: law.ou.edu

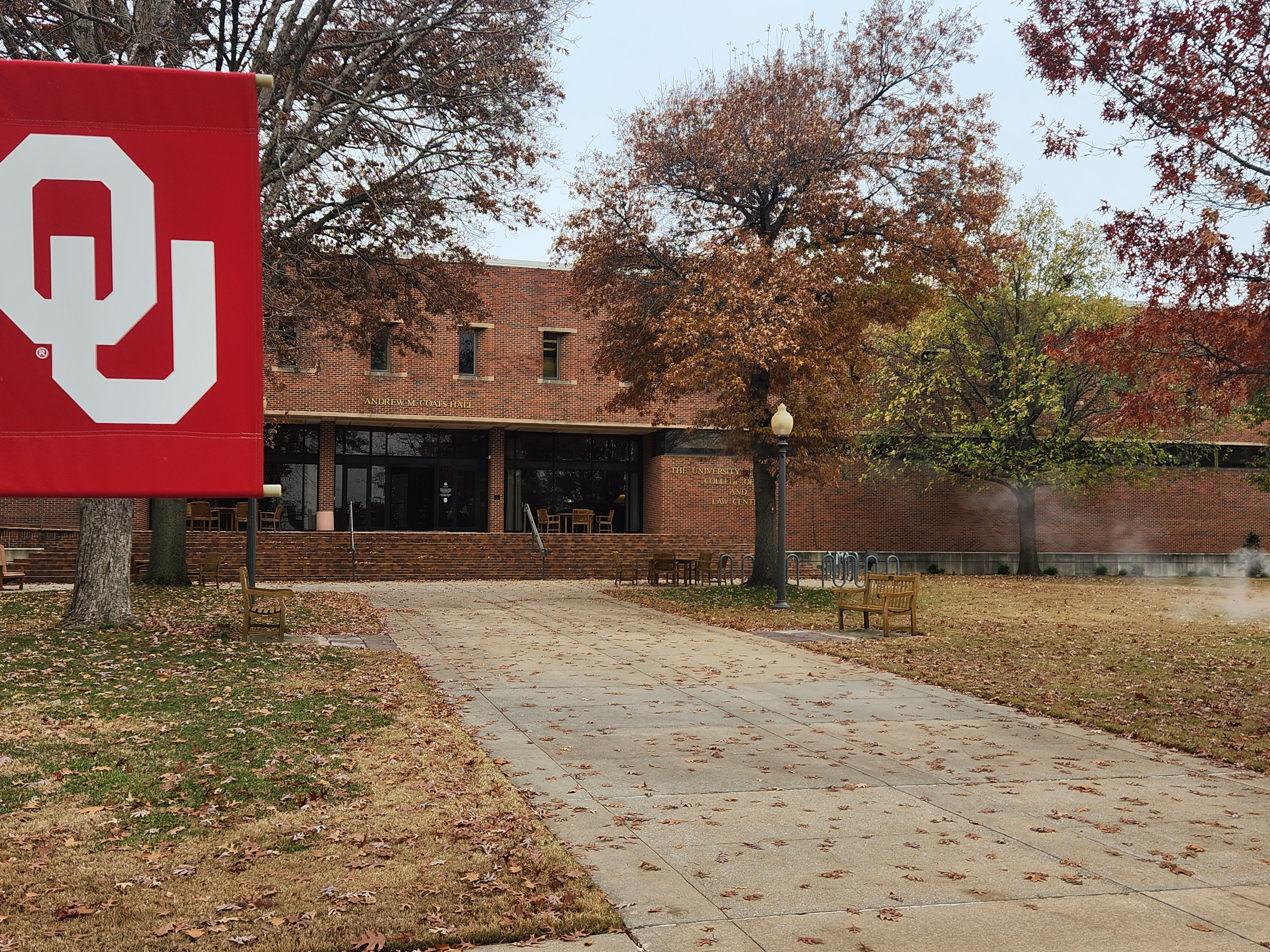
Andrew M. Coats Hall (2023)

The University of Oklahoma College of Law is the law school of the University of Oklahoma. It is located on the University's campus in Norman, Oklahoma. The College of Law was founded in 1909 by a resolution of the OU Board of Regents.

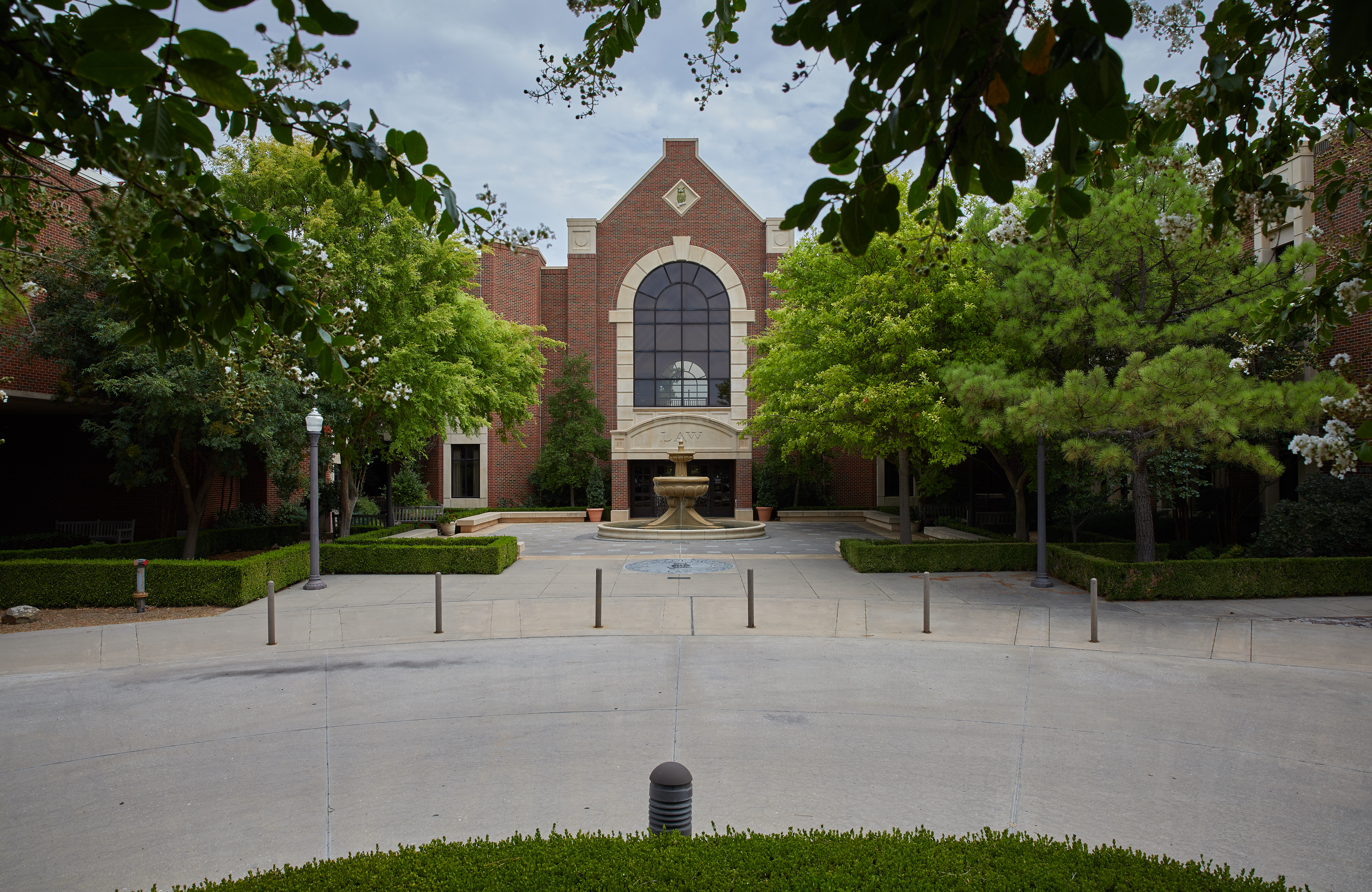
The William J. Ross Courtyard at the University of Oklahoma College of Law.

According to OU Law's 2016 ABA-required disclosures, 83.9% of the Class of 2016 obtained full-time, long-term positions for which bar passage was required (75.5%) or for which a J.D. was an advantage (8.39%) nine months after graduation.

== History ==
The College of Law was founded by Julien C. Monnet in 1909. From its beginnings of Dean Monnet, two faculty members, and 47 students, the College of Law has grown. The College of Law initially shared space in the Science Building before moving to the basement of the Carnegie Building.

In 1914, after extensive lobbying by students, the college moved into its first permanent home, Monnet Hall. The "47,000-square-foot Law Barn," as it was known, was home to the college for 62 years. As the home of the College of Law, it was witness to many events in Oklahoma history, including the admission of then-future OU Regent Ada Lois Sipuel Fisher, the first black woman admitted to the College of Law, in 1948.

Despite the additional square footage built onto the rear of Monnet Hall, the Law Center, which the College of Law and its associated entities came to be called in 1971, outgrew the building, forcing a relocation to its current home on Timberdell Road in 1976. Adding the American Indian Law Review to complement the established Oklahoma Law Review, expanding clinical legal education, and generally striving to meet the increasing demands of legal education in the late 20th century caused OU Law to once again outgrow its facilities.

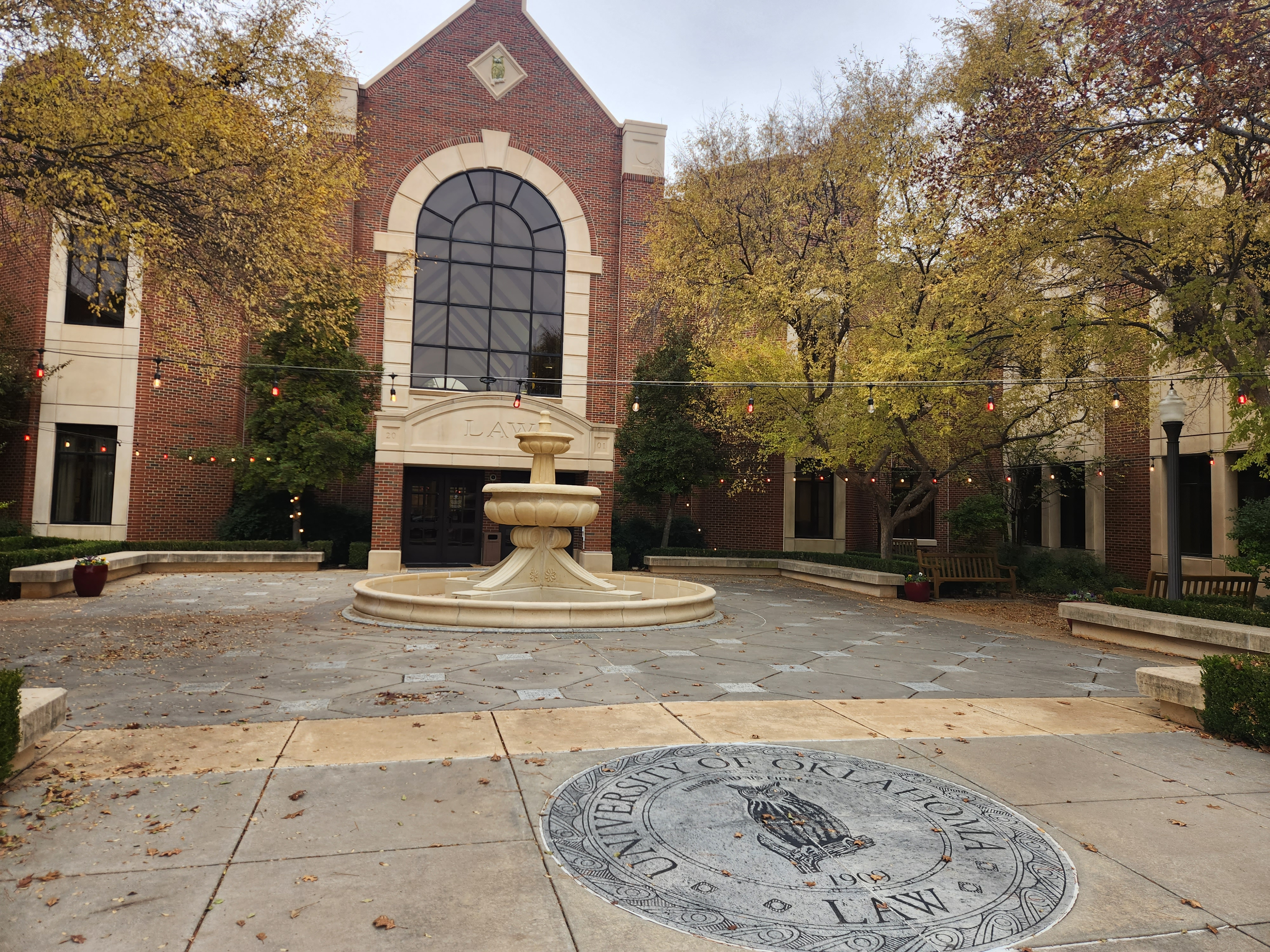
College of Law (2023)

In 1989, Anita Hill became the first African-American to receive tenure from the school. In the wake of her accusations against then-Supreme Court nominee Clarence Thomas, Conservative Oklahoma state legislators reacted by demanding Hill's resignation from the university, then introducing a bill to prohibit the university from accepting donations from out-of-state residents, and finally attempting to pass legislation to close down the law school. Certain officials at the university attempted to revoke Hill's tenure. After five years of pressure, Hill resigned. The University of Oklahoma College of Law defunded the Anita F. Hill professorship in May 1999, without the position having ever been filled.

=== Andrew M. Coats Hall ===
In October 1999, ground was broken on a $19 million construction and renovation project which ultimately added 80,000 square feet to the facility. Named in honor of then-Dean Andrew M. Coats, the facility features the 58,000-square-foot Donald E. Pray Law Library and the 250-seat Dick Bell Courtroom. The new library features the Chapman Reading room, modeled after the reading room in Monnet Hall, with a parquet floor reminiscent of the floors in the Louvre. The Donald E. Pray Law Library, which is open to the public, boasts the largest law collection, public or private, in the state.

The Bell Courtroom has hosted appellate cases from both the Oklahoma Court of Criminal Appeals (including a death penalty appeal) and the U.S. Court of Appeals for the 10th Circuit, as well as civil trials from the U.S. District Court for the Western District of Oklahoma.

On July 1, 2010, Joseph Harroz became the 12th Dean of the University of Oklahoma College of Law and 7th Director of the OU Law Center. In May 2019, Harroz became interim president of the entire University of Oklahoma and OU law professor Kathleen Guzman was appointed interim dean of the college. Kathleen Guzman stepped down from her position in 2024 and Anna E. Carpenter became dean of the University of Oklahoma College of Law immediately thereafter.

=== Digital Initiative ===
In August 2014, OU Law became the first law school in the nation to launch a college-wide Digital Initiative. OU Law Digital Initiative is built around three core elements:

- the common platform of iPad Pro with Apple Pencil, given to all students at no cost, for hand-writing notes and annotating documents;
- a digital training curriculum that educates OU Law students to use technology for productivity in law school and in practice; and
- the Inasmuch Foundation Collaborative Learning Center, which opened in September 2016, is an 8,000-square-foot space that allows students to become familiar with how technology can be used to collaborate on projects.

In May 2017, OU Law celebrated the Class of 2017's graduation, marking the first year an OU Law class collectively completed the school’s Digital Initiative programming, and making the college the first law school in the nation to do so. In November 2017, OU Law launched the OU Law Center for Technology and Innovation in Practice, formally bringing together and expanding the elements of the college's Digital Initiative. In January 2018, OU Law was named an Apple Distinguished School for 2017-2019 in recognition of its Digital Initiative.

== Academics ==
OU Law enrolls more than 700 students annually in its Juris Doctor (J.D.), Master of Laws (LL.M.), and Master of Legal Studies (M.L.S.) degree programs. The University of Oklahoma Law Center is home to the Legal Assistant Education Program.

== Notable alumni ==
Notable graduates include former U.S. Senator and former OU President David L. Boren, business executive and former OU President James L. Gallogly, former Oklahoma Governors Frank Keating, Brad Henry, and Leon C. Phillips, Oklahoma State University President V. Burns Hargis, president of Oklahoma City University and former 10th Circuit Judge Robert Harlan Henry, New Mexico Governor Susana Martinez, former Congressman and Under Secretary of Defense for Personnel and Readiness Brad Carson, former Ambassador to Saudi Arabia Robert W. Jordan, Oklahoma attorney general Michael Hunter, Director of the Oklahoma Administrative Office of the Courts and former Oklahoma Lieutenant Governor Jari Askins, former mayor of Tulsa Kathy Taylor, Denver Broncos owner Pat Bowlen, civil rights pioneer Ada Lois Sipuel Fisher, and former Oklahoma state senator Gene Stipe.

Alumni serving in the judiciary include Oklahoma Supreme Court Justices Ben Arnold, David Boren, Orel Busby, Tom Colbert, Richard Darby, Denver Davison, J. Howard Edmondson, Noma Gurich, Brad Henry, Frank Keating, Steven W. Taylor, Ben T. Williams and Patrick Wyrick; Oklahoma Court of Criminal Appeals Judges Robert L. Hudson, Gary Lumpkin, and David B. Lewis; Choctaw tribal judge Rebecca Cryer; and former 10th Circuit Judge Alfred P. Murrah.

Oklahoma attorney general Mac Q. Williamson also graduated from the Oklahoma University College (OUC) of Law.

== Bar Passage ==
According to OU Law's 2025 ABA-required disclosures, 88.77% of students graduating in the calendar year of 2024 passed the bar exam on their first attempt.

== Employment ==
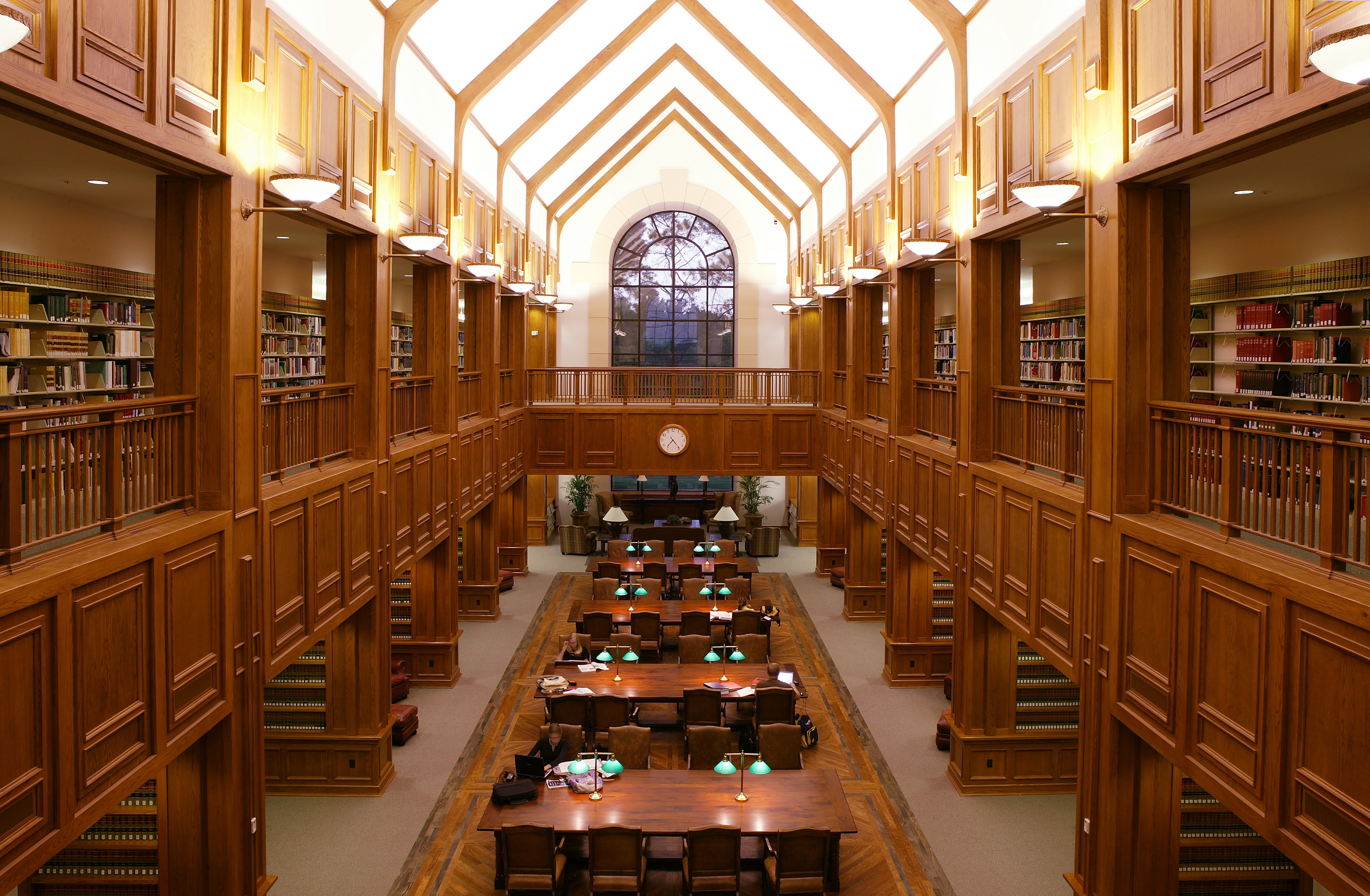
The Donald E. Pray Law Library at the University of Oklahoma College of Law.

According to OU Law's 2024 ABA-required disclosures, 92.7% of the Class of 2024 obtained long-term positions for which bar passage was required (89.1%) or for which a J.D. was an advantage (3.6%) nine months after graduation. This is above the national average of 88%.

== Pro bono and public service law ==
=== Pro Bono Pledge ===
Every year at orientation, OU Law asks every student in the incoming 1L class to sign a voluntary Pro Bono and Public Service Pledge. Students can choose to pledge either 50 hours or 100 hours of pro bono and public service over the course of their law school career. In the Class of 2020, a record 100% of the students signed the Pro Bono and Public Service Pledge and nearly two-thirds of those students pledged 100 hours.

In the 2017-2018 academic year, OU Law students completed a record-breaking 24,024 hours of pro bono and public service.

=== Legal clinics ===
Through the OU College of Law Civil Clinic and Criminal Defense Clinic, students represent clients from Cleveland and McClain counties who would not otherwise be able to afford counsel. Operating under the close supervision of faculty attorneys, student interns face many of the same situations and practice demands they will encounter as attorneys while being directly responsible for representation of clients as licensed legal interns practicing under the Oklahoma Supreme Court Student Practice Rules.

== List of Deans ==
The Deans for the University of Oklahoma College of Law and their years of service are included below:

Name	Beginning of Service	End of Service
Julien Charles Monnet	1909	1941
John Gaines Hervey	1941	1945
W. Page Keeton	1946	1950
Earl Sneed, Jr.	1950	1965
Eugene O. Kuntz	1965	1970
Robert R. Wright, III	1970	1976
James E. Westbrook	1976	1980
Wayne E. Alley	1981	1985
David Swank	1986	1993
C. Peter Goplerud, III	1993	1996
Andrew M. Coats	1996	2010
Joseph Harroz Jr.	2010	2021
Kathleen Guzman	2021	2024
Anna E. Carpenter	2024	Present

== Costs ==
The total cost of attendance (indicating the cost of tuition and fees) at OU Law for the 2023-2024 academic year is $23,554.00 for Oklahoma residents and $37,819.00 for non-residents.

== Publications ==
- Oklahoma Law Review
- American Indian Law Review
- Oil and Gas, Natural Resources, and Energy Journal (ONEJ)
- Sooner Lawyer Archive
