= Pat Irwin (Oklahoma judge) =

American judge (1921–1999)

- Born: June 12, 1921; Leedey, Oklahoma, U.S.
- Died: October 21, 1999 (aged 78); Edmond, Oklahoma, U.S.
- Occupations: Attorney, judge
- Years active: 1949–1991
- Known for: Justice of the Oklahoma State Supreme Court

Pat Irwin (June 12, 1921 – October 21, 1999) was a judge in Oklahoma. He served as a Justice on the Oklahoma Supreme Court from 1958 to 1983, including two terms as Chief Justice (1969–1970) and (1981–1982).

He was born June 21, 1921, in Leedey, Oklahoma to Marvin J. and Olive D. Irwin. Irwin studied at Southwestern State College , (Note: since renamed as Southwestern Oklahoma State University (SWOSU)) (Note: He remained at Southwestern for only three years (1939–1942), when he enlisted in the U. S. Marine Air Corps, and was sent to the South Pacific with the rank of captain from 1943 to 1946. After the end of World War II, he attended Oklahoma University, where he earned the LL.B. and later an LLD.) He served as the County Attorney for Dewey County, Oklahoma in 1949–1950, then served in the Oklahoma Senate from 1950 through 1954. He also served as Secretary of the Oklahoma School Land Commission and as a member of the Western States Land Commission between 1955 and 1958.

Irwin was appointed as a justice on the Oklahoma State Supreme Court, where he served from 1959 to 1983, representing District 4, including two terms as Chief Justice (1969–1970 and 1981–1982). Retiring from the Oklahoma Supreme Court in 1983, he was appointed magistrate for the United States District Court for the Western District of Oklahoma. In early 1990, he was listed as one of the ex officio, non-voting members in a report to the court authorities in Washington, D. C. He retired from this magistrate judge position on September 1, 1999.
