= Richard Darby =

American judge (born 1958)

Chief Justice of the Oklahoma Supreme Court
- In office January 1, 2021 – December 31, 2022
- Preceded by: Noma Gurich
- Succeeded by: M. John Kane IV

Justice of the Oklahoma Supreme Court
- Incumbent
- Assumed office April 5, 2018
- Appointed by: Mary Fallin
- Preceded by: Joseph M. Watt

Personal details
- Born: 1958 (age 67–68) Duke, Oklahoma, U.S.
- Spouse: Dana Darby
- Children: 2
- Education: Southwestern Oklahoma State University (BS); University of Oklahoma (JD)

Richard Darby (born 1958) is an American lawyer and the former chief justice of the Oklahoma Supreme Court. On April 5, 2018, Governor Mary Fallin appointed Darby to the Oklahoma Supreme Court to fill the vacancy created by the retirement of Joseph M. Watt.

In his new position, Darby represents the 9th Judicial District, which includes Harmon, Greer, Jackson, Kiowa, Tillman, Cotton, Comanche, Caddo and Canadian counties. Prior to this new appointment, Darby had served as District Judge for the 3rd Judicial District covering Jackson, Kiowa, Tillman, Greer and Harmon counties. That assignment began in 1994. Before that, he had been a special judge and an associate district judge for Jackson County. He became Chief Judge on January 1, 2021.

== Education ==
Darby earned his Bachelor of Science in political science from Southwestern Oklahoma State University and his Juris Doctor from the University of Oklahoma College of Law.

== Legal career ==
Prior to his appointment to the Supreme Court, Richard Darby was a state district court judge in the 3rd Judicial District for 24 years from 1994 to 2018. (Note: The 3rd Judicial District covered Jackson, Kiowa, Tillman, Greer and Harmon counties.) Darby presided over both civil and criminal cases, as well as assigning cases to six other judges in the district. He also managed a staff consisting of a secretary, a bailiff and 5 court reporters. In 2014, he ran unopposed for retention, so he was returned to the district court without appearing on the ballot. Before that, he served as a special judge and an associate district judge in Jackson County, Oklahoma.

== Personal ==
Darby has been married to Dana Darby, Ph.D, who is superintendent of Altus Christian Academy. They have two sons: Ben, a communications officer for the Oklahoma Highway Patrol and Jonathan, a student at Universal Technical Institute in Irving, Texas.

== Notes ==
Legal offices
| Preceded by Joseph M. Watt | Justice of the Oklahoma Supreme Court; 2018–present | Incumbent |
| Preceded by Noma Gurich | Chief Justice of the Oklahoma Supreme Court; 2021–2022 | Succeeded by M. John Kane IV |
