= Robert E. Lavender =

American judge (1926–2020)

Chief Justice of the Oklahoma Supreme Court
- In office 1979–1981

Justice of the Oklahoma Supreme Court
- In office June 24, 1965 – August 1, 2007
- Appointed by: Henry Bellmon
- Preceded by: Napoleon B. Johnson
- Succeeded by: John F. Reif

Personal details
- Born: July 19, 1926 Muskogee, Oklahoma
- Died: March 23, 2020 (aged 93) Oklahoma City, Oklahoma
- Spouse: Maxine Knight (m. 1945–2010)
- Education: University of Tulsa College of Law (LL.B.)

Military service
- Allegiance: United States
- Branch/service: United States Navy
- Years of service: 1944–1946
- Battles/wars: World War II

Robert Eugene Lavender (July 19, 1926 – March 23, 2020) was an American judge who served as Justice of the Oklahoma Supreme Court, serving from 1965 until 2007. He served as the Court's Chief Justice from 1979 to 1981. Lavender died on March 23, 2020, at the age of 93.

== Early life and education ==
Robert E. Lavender was born in Muskogee, Oklahoma, and grew up first in Tulsa and then on a farm in Catoosa, outside of Tulsa, where he graduated from high school in 1944. Immediately enlisting in the United States Navy, he spent the final year of World War II, on reserve duty in the South Pacific. In 1953, he earned a Bachelor of Laws from the University of Tulsa College of Law.

== Career in law ==
While earning his law degree, Lavender worked as an assistant court clerk in the Tulsa County District and Common Pleas courts. Following graduation from law school, he became Assistant City Attorney in Tulsa, before joining a private practice in Claremore, Oklahoma.

Lavender was still in private practice when Governor Henry Bellmon appointed him to fill a vacancy on the Oklahoma Supreme Court on June 24, 1965, representing the 1st District. The vacancy was caused by the impeachment of Justice Napoleon B. Johnson. The next year, he was elected to hold that same seat for a full six-year term, ending in 1972, and he was subsequently retained in 1972, 1978, 1984, 1990, 1996, and 2002. While on the Supreme Court, Lavender authored an opinion abrogating state sovereign immunity (Vanderpool v. State, 1983).

He retired from the Oklahoma Supreme Court, effective August 1, 2007. A retirement ceremony was held in his office on July 23, 2007, where his family, friends, and present and former Supreme Court colleagues honored him for his 42 years of service on the court, longer than any other justice in the history of the Oklahoma Supreme Court. Then-Governor Brad Henry read a quote that Lavender had made when he first took office. "My sole ambition as a member of this court is to study the cases, work hard, and so conduct my personal life as to inspire confidence and earn the trust of the people in this court as an institution. It is my opinion that a strong and independent judiciary composed of men of unimpeachable integrity is an absolute essential to the continuation of our society.”

Governor Henry subsequently appointed John F. Reif to succeed Justice Lavender.

== Personal life ==
Lavender married Maxine Knight on December 22, 1945. The couple had met while both were attending Catoosa High School. Lavender's wife worked as a child development specialist and as a consultant for blind and visually-impaired students in nearby school districts. They were married until her death on March 5, 2010.
