= Oklahoma Supreme Court =

One of the two highest judicial bodies in the U.S. state of Oklahoma

Coordinates: 35.492282°N 97.503372°W

- Interactive map of Oklahoma Supreme Court
- Established: 1907
- Jurisdiction: Oklahoma
- Location: Oklahoma City, Oklahoma
- Composition method: Gubernatorial appointment with non-partisan statewide retention
- Authorised by: Oklahoma Constitution
- Appeals to: Supreme Court of the United States
- Judge term length: Life, renewable every 6 years
- Number of positions: 9
- Website: Official website

Chief Justice
- Currently: Dustin Rowe
- Since: January 1, 2025

The Supreme Court of Oklahoma is a court of appeal for non-criminal cases, one of the two highest judicial bodies in the U.S. state of Oklahoma, and leads the judiciary of Oklahoma, the judicial branch of the government of Oklahoma.

The Oklahoma Supreme Court meets in the Oklahoma Judicial Center, having previously met in the Oklahoma State Capitol until 2011. The court consists of nine justices nominated by a state commission and appointed by the governor.

Members of the court are required to be nonpartisan and are prohibited from a number of political activities including making or soliciting campaign contributions.

== History ==
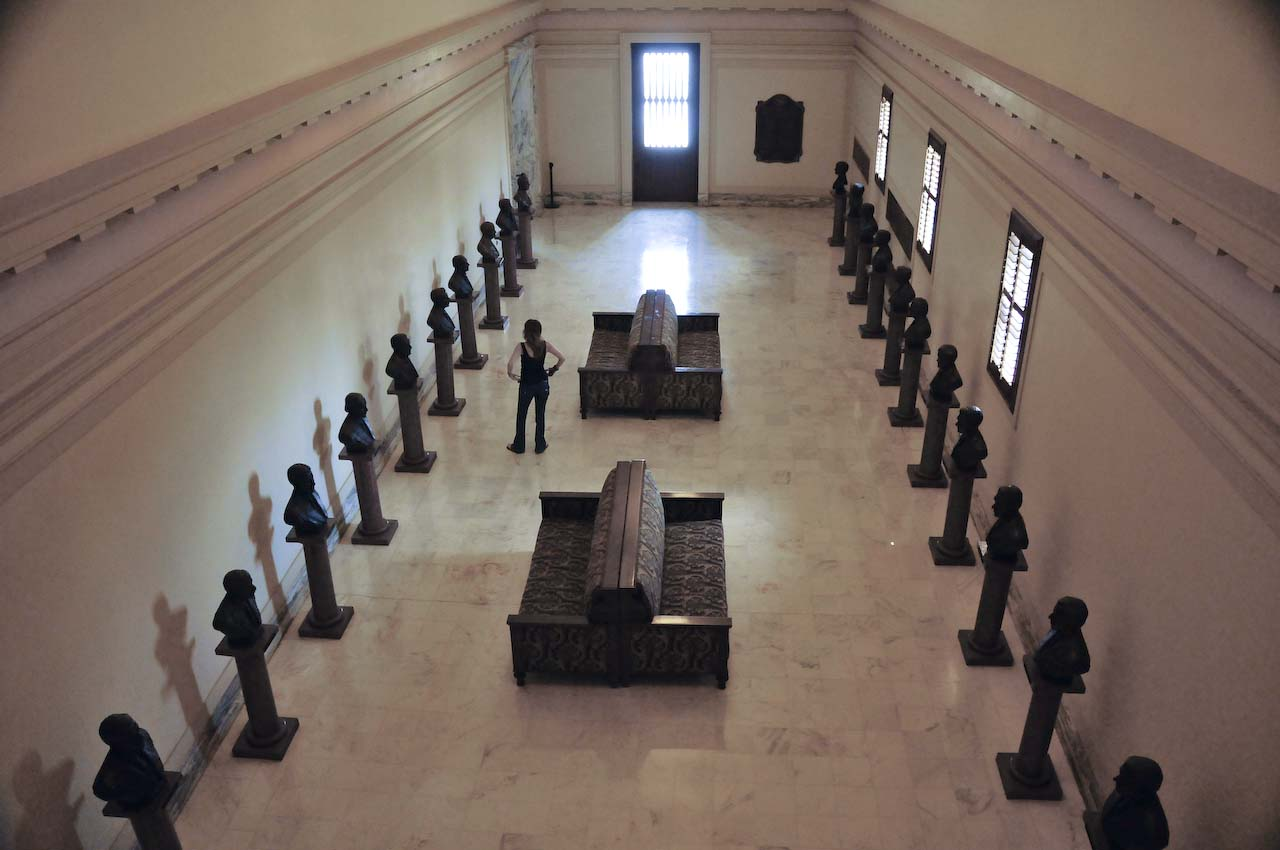
Hall leading to the Oklahoma Supreme Court when it met in the Oklahoma State Capitol.

The Oklahoma Supreme Court was created by the ratification of the Oklahoma Constitution in 1907.

After construction on the Oklahoma State Capitol, which was completed in 1917, the Oklahoma Supreme Court offices and chamber were housed in the building. Plans to move the offices began in 2006. In 2011, the Oklahoma Supreme Court moved its offices from the Oklahoma State Capitol to the Oklahoma Judicial Center.

== Composition ==
The Oklahoma Supreme Court consists of a chief justice, a vice-chief justice, and seven associate justices, who are nominated by the Oklahoma Judicial Nominating Commission and are appointed by the governor. After appointment, the justices serve until the next general state election. At that time, they must face a retention election. If retained, they begin a six-year term. After their first term, justices must file for direct election by the people of Oklahoma to retain their position.

The Oklahoma Constitution specifies the size of the Oklahoma Supreme Court; however, it also grants the state legislature the power to change the number of justices by statute. According to Article VII, section 2, of the Oklahoma Constitution, the court shall consist of nine justices, one justice from each of the nine judicial districts of the state.

== Qualification, appointment process and tenure ==
Each justice, at the time of election or appointment, must be at least thirty years old, a registered voter in the Supreme Court judicial district they represent for at least one year before filing for the position and a licensed practicing attorney or judge (or both) in Oklahoma for five years before appointment. The potential justice must maintain certification as an attorney or judge while in office in order to remain in their position.

Qualified nominees must submit their names to the Oklahoma Judicial Nominating Commission to verify that they will serve if appointed. In the event of a vacancy on the court, after reviewing potential justices, the commission must submit three names to the governor, of whom the governor appoints one to the Supreme Court to serve until the next general state election. If the governor fails to appoint a justice within sixty days, the chief justice may appoint one of the nominees, who must certify their appointment to the Oklahoma Secretary of State.

Elected justices serve six years in office with a term beginning on the second Monday in January following the general election. Justices appointed to fill vacancies take office immediately and continue to serve in their appointed posts until the next general election. To be eligible to stand for reelection, justices must, within sixty days before the general election, submit their desire to stand for reelection to the Secretary of State.

The justice is then put to election by the people of Oklahoma. If the majority votes to maintain the justice, the justice will serve for another six-year term. However, if the justice declines reelection or the voters vote the justice down, the seat on the Supreme Court shall be considered vacant at the end of the current term and the Judicial Nominating Commission must search for a potential replacement. Justices who have failed to file for reelection or were not retained by the people in the general election are not eligible to immediately succeed themselves.

Retention in office may be sought for successive terms without limit as to number of years or terms served in office.

== Jurisdiction and powers ==
Section 4 of Article VII of the Oklahoma Constitution outlines the jurisdiction of the Supreme Court of Oklahoma. The appellate jurisdiction of the Supreme Court is co-extensive with that of the state's borders. The court's jurisdiction applies to all cases "at law and in equity," except criminal cases, in which the Oklahoma Court of Criminal Appeals has exclusive appellate jurisdiction. If there is a conflict in determining which court has jurisdiction, the Oklahoma Supreme Court is granted the power to determine which court has jurisdiction, with no appeal from the court's determination.

Along with Texas, Oklahoma is one of two states to have two courts of last resort; the Oklahoma Supreme Court decides only civil cases, and the Oklahoma Court of Criminal Appeals decides criminal cases. The Oklahoma Supreme Court has only immediate jurisdiction with respect to new first-impression issues, important legal issues, and cases of great public interest. In addition to appeals from the trial courts, the Oklahoma Supreme Court has jurisdiction over all lower courts, excluding the Oklahoma Court on the Judiciary, and the Oklahoma Senate, when that body is sitting as a Court of Impeachment. Judgments of the Oklahoma Supreme Court with respect to the Oklahoma Constitution are considered final.

The court's authority includes the power to temporarily reassign judges. The Oklahoma Supreme Court also maintains the power to appoint an administrative director and staff. The director serves at the pleasure of the court to assist the chief justice in his administrative duties and to assist the Oklahoma Court on the Judiciary when it calls upon the office's administrative powers.

The court has the power to issue, hear and determine writs of habeas corpus, mandamus, quo warranto, certiorari, prohibition and other remedial writs provided in statute and can be given further authority through statute. A justice of the court can issue the writ of habeas corpus to individuals held in custody if petitioned. Writs can be made to appear before any judge in the state.

Aside from hearing cases, the court is also responsible for administering the state's entire judicial system, establishing rules of operation for the state's other courts. The Oklahoma Supreme Court formulates the rules for the practice of law, which govern the conduct of attorneys, and it administers discipline in appropriate cases. Many of the justices make personal appearances to speak to members of the bar, civic clubs, and educational groups. These appearances are made to help citizens understand the court's workings and decision-making process. Justices are also called upon to administer official oaths of office to public officials.

== Ethics restrictions ==
Judicial officers are charged with maintaining the integrity and independence of the judiciary. Justices are required to be nonpartisan and are prohibited from using their office or powers to promote or assist any private interest. Justices may not hold offices in political parties, make speeches for candidates, or contribute to campaigns for political office.

Justices are also forbidden from campaigning for their own re-election unless there is active opposition to their retention in office. Even if justices or judges are actively campaigning for retention, they can not personally raise funds for their campaign.

== Membership ==
=== Current justices ===
The Justices of the Oklahoma Supreme Court are:

District	Name	Born	Start	Chief term	Term ends	Appointer	Law school
2	Dustin Rowe, Chief Justice	September 23, 1975 (age 51)	November 20, 2019	2025–present	2028	Kevin Stitt (R)	Oklahoma
6	Dana Kuehn, Vice Chief Justice	January 1, 1971 (age 55)	July 26, 2021	–	2032	Kevin Stitt (R)	Tulsa
5	James R. Winchester	March 23, 1952 (age 74)	January 4, 2000	2007–2008	2028	Frank Keating (R)	Oklahoma City
7	James E. Edmondson	March 7, 1945 (age 81)	December 3, 2003	2009–2010	2030	Brad Henry (D)	Georgetown
8	Doug Combs	October 17, 1951 (age 75)	November 5, 2010	2017–2018	2028	Brad Henry (D)	Oklahoma City
3	Noma Gurich	September 26, 1952 (age 74)	January 7, 2011	2019–2020	2030	Brad Henry (D)	Oklahoma
9	Richard Darby	January 1, 1958 (age 68)	April 5, 2018	2021–2023	2032	Mary Fallin (R)	Oklahoma
1	M. John Kane IV	April 8, 1962 (age 64)	September 17, 2019	2023–2025	2032	Kevin Stitt (R)	Oklahoma
4	Travis Jett	November 1, 1984 (age 42)	April 14, 2025	–	2030	Kevin Stitt (R)	Georgetown

This graphical timeline depicts the length of each current Supreme Court justice's tenure (but not seniority) on the Court:

=== Chief Justice ===
The Chief Justice of the Oklahoma Supreme Court is the highest ranking judicial officer in the State and is tasked with administering the state judiciary. Unlike the Supreme Court of the United States where one justice is specifically appointed to be chief, the office of Chief Justice rotates among the justices. The justice elect from among their members a chief justice and a vice chief justice to serve a two-year term. There are no term limits or age restrictions on the position.

The Senior Justice of the Oklahoma Supreme Court is the current serving justice with the longest tenure on the court. As most of the day-to-day activities of the court are based upon seniority of the justices, the position is the third highest ranking on the court, behind the Chief Justice and the Vice Chief Justice. As the role of Chief Justice rotates among the justices, the Senior Justice represents the institutional memory of the court.

Chief Justice
Williams	1907–1909
Kane (1st time)	1909–1910
Dunn	1910–1911
Turner	1911–1913
Hayes	1913–1915
Kane (2nd time)	1915–1917
Sharp	1917–1919
Hardy	1919
Owen	1919–1920
Rainey	1920–1921
Harrison	1921–1923
Pitchford	1923
Johnson	1923–1924
N. McNeil	1924–1925
Nicholson	1925–1927
Branson	1927–1929
Mason	1929–1931
Lester	1931–1933
Riley	1933–1935
E. McNeil	1935–1937
Osborn	1937–1939
Bayless	1939–1941
Welch (1st time)	1941–1943
Corn	1943–1945
Gibson	1945–1947
Hurst	1947–1949
Davison (1st time)	1949–1951
Arnold	1951–1953
Halley (1st time)	1953–1955
Johnson	1955–1957
Welch (2nd time)	1957–1959
Davison (2nd time)	1959–1961
Williams (1st time)	1961–1963
Blackbird	1963–1965
Halley (2nd time)	1965–1967
Jackson	1967–1969
Irwin (1st time)	1969–1971
Berry	1971–1973
Davison (3rd time)	1973–1975
Williams (2nd time)	1975–1977
Hodges (1st time)	1977–1979
Lavender	1979–1981
Irwin (2nd time)	1981–1983
Barnes	1983–1985
Simms	1985–1987
Doolin	1987–1989
Hargrave (1st time)	1989–1991
Opala	1991–1993
Hodges (2nd time)	1993–1995
Wilson	1995–1997
Kauger	1997–1999
Summers	1999–2001
Hargrave (2nd time)	2001–2003
Watt	2003–2007
Winchester	2007–2009
Edmondson	2009–2011
Taylor	2011–2013
Colbert	2013–2015
Reif	2015–2017
Combs	2017–2019
Gurich	2019–2021
Darby	2021–2023
Kane	2023–2025
Rowe	2025–present

Senior Justice
Turner	1907–1919
Kane	1919–1923
Harrison	1923–1929
Mason	1929–1931
Riley	1931–1949
Welch	1949–1965
Davison	1965–1978
Williams	1978–1983
Hodges	1983–2005
Lavender	2005–2008
Hargrave	2008–2011
Kauger	2011–2025
Winchester	2025–present

=== Retired justices ===
There are currently seven living retired justices of the Oklahoma Supreme Court: Daniel J. Boudreau, Steven W. Taylor, Joseph M. Watt, Patrick Wyrick, John Reif, Tom Colbert, and Yvonne Kauger. As retired justices, they no longer participate in the work of the Supreme Court.

Name	Start	End	Appointer
Daniel J. Boudreau	1999	2004	Frank Keating
Steven W. Taylor	2004	2016	Brad Henry
Joseph M. Watt	1992	2017	David Walters
Patrick Wyrick	2017	2019	Mary Fallin
John Reif	2007	2019	Brad Henry
Tom Colbert	2003	2021	Brad Henry
Yvonne Kauger	1984	2024	George Nigh

=== Seating ===
Many of the internal operations of the court are organized by seniority of justices, with the chief justice is considered the most senior member of the court followed by the vice-chief justice, regardless of the length of their service. The other justices are then ranked by the length of their service. During the sessions of the court, the justices sit according to seniority, with the Chief Justice in the center, the Vice-Chief Justice to chief's immediate right, and the most senior Justice to the chief's immediate left. The remaining justices alternate sides, with the most junior justice being to the chief's furthest left.

As of 2026, with the retirement of Justice Yvone Kauger, from the perspective of the audience, the justices sit as follows:

Justice	Justice	Justice	Vice Chief Justice	Chief Justice	Senior Justice	Justice	Justice	Justice
John Kane	Noman Gurich	James Edmondson	Dana Kuehn	Dustin Rowe	James Winchester	Douglas Combs	Richard Darby	Travis Jett

=== Succession of seats ===
The court has nine seats for active justices, numbered in the order in which they were filled. Justices who retire have no role in the operations of court except as authorized by the court itself. That seat is filled by the next justices appointed by the governor.

Seat 1
Seat established in 1907
Seat filled by partisan election until 1968
Seat filled by non-partisan governor appointment after 1968
District made concurrent with 2nd Congressional district in 2020
J.B. Turner	Democratic	1907–1918
J.H. Pitchford	Democratic	1918–1923
C.W. Mason	Democratic	1923–1931
J.H. Langley	Democratic	1931-1931
W.H. Kornegay	Democratic	1931–1933
W.W. Bayless	Democratic	1933–1949
N.B. Johnson	Democratic	1949–1965
R.E. Lavender	Republican	1965–2007
J.F. Reif	Nonpartisan	2007–2019
M.J. Kane IV	Nonpartisan	2019–present

Seat 2
Seat established in 1907
Seat filled by partisan election until 1968
Seat filled by non-partisan governor appointment after 1968
District made at-large in 2020
R.L. Williams	Democratic	1907–1914
S.H. Russell	Democratic	1914-1914
W. R. Bleakmore	Democratic	1914-1914
S.T. Hardy	Democratic	1914–1919
R.W. Higgins	Democratic	1919–1920
C. H. Elting	Republican	1920–1922
C.B. Cochrane	Democratic	1922–1924
James H. Gordon	Democratic	1924-1924
E.F. Lester	Democratic	1924–1933
S.E. Welch	Democratic	1933–1965
R.B. Hodges	Democratic	1965–2004
S.W. Taylor	Nonpartisan	2004–2016
P.R. Wyrick	Nonpartisan	2017–2019
D. Rowe	Nonpartisan	2019–present

Seat 3
Seat established in 1907
Seat filled by partisan election until 1968
Seat filled by non-partisan governor appointment after 1968
District made concurrent with 5th Congressional district in 2020
M.J. Kane	Democratic	1908–1924
J.D. Lydick	Democratic	1924-1924
J.I. Phelps	Democratic	1924–1929
J.B. Cullison	Republican	1929–1935
J.I. Phelps	Democratic	1935–1938
H.L. Danner	Democratic	1938–1940
S. Neff	Democratic	1940-1940
B. Arnold	Democratic	1940–1955
A.C. Hunt	Democratic	1955–1956
W.A. Carlile	Democratic	1956–1959
W.A. Berry	Democratic	1959–1978
M.P. Opala	Nonpartisan	1978–2010
N.D. Gurich	Nonpartisan	2010–present

Seat 4
Seat established in 1907
Seat filled by partisan election until 1968
Seat switched with Seat 5 in 1917
Seat filled by non-partisan governor appointment after 1968
District made concurrent with 3rd Congressional district in 2020
J.J. Dunn	Democratic	1907–1913
R.H. Loofbourrow	Democratic	1913–1914
J. F. Sharp	Democratic	1914–1917
C.M. Thacker	Democratic	1917–1918
B.L. Tisinger	Democratic	1918-1918
J.B. Harrison	Democratic	1918–1929
C. Swindall	Republican	1929–1935
N.S. Corn	Democratic	1935–1959
P. Irwin	Democratic	1959–1983
Y. Kauger	Nonpartisan	1984–2024
T. Jett	Nonpartisan	2025–present

Seat 5
Seat established in 1907
Seat filled by partisan election until 1968
Seat switched with Seat 4 in 1917
Seat filled by non-partisan governor appointment after 1968
District made concurrent with 4th Congressional district in 2020
S.W. Hayes	Democratic	1907–1914
F. E. Riddle	Democratic	1914-1914
G. A. Brown	Democratic	1914–1915
C.M. Thacker	Democratic	1915–1917
J. F. Sharp	Democratic	1917–1919
Frank M. Bailey	Democratic	1919–1921
G.M. Nicholson	Republican	1921–1927
R.A. Hefner	Democratic	1927–1933
M. Osborn	Democratic	1933–1947
J.E. Luttrell	Democratic	1947–1951
G. Bingaman	Democratic	1951–1952
B.T. Williams	Democratic	1952–1982
A. Wilson	Nonpartisan	1982–1999
J.R. Winchester	Nonpartisan	2000–present

Seat 6
Seat established in 1917
Seat filled by partisan election until 1968
Seat filled by non-partisan governor appointment after 1968
District made concurrent with 1st Congressional district in 2020
J.H. Miley	Democratic	1917–1918
N.E. McNeil	Democratic	1918–1925
A.C. Hunt	Democratic	1925–1931
E.R. McNeill	Democratic	1931–1937
T.S. Hurst	Democratic	1937–1949
H.L.S. Halley	Democratic	1949–1967
R. McInerney	Democratic	1967–1972
R.D. Simms	Nonpartisan	1972–1999
D.J. Boudreau	Nonpartisan	1999–2004
T. Colbert	Nonpartisan	2004–2021
D. Kuehn	Nonpartisan	2021–present

Seat 7
Seat established in 1917
Seat filled by partisan election until 1968
Seat filled by non-partisan governor appointment after 1968
District made at-large in 2020
T.H. Owen	Democratic	1917–1920
G.S. Ramsey	Republican	1920-1920
W.A. Collier	Democratic	1920-1920
J.R. Miller	Republican	1920–1923
F.P. Branson	Democratic	1923–1929
T.G. Andrews	Republican	1929–1935
T.L. Gibson	Democratic	1935–1953
W.H. Blackbird	Democratic	1953–1965
W.H. Blackbird	Democratic	1965–1971
D. Barnes	Nonpartisan	1972–1985
E.H. Summers	Nonpartisan	1985–2004
J.E. Edmondson	Nonpartisan	2004–present

Seat 8
Seat established in 1917
Seat filled by partisan election until 1968
Seat filled by non-partisan governor appointment after 1968
District made at-large in 2020
R.M. Rainey	Democratic	1917–1921
F.E. Kennamer	Republican	1921–1924
F.L. Warren	Democratic	1924-1924
J.W. Clark	Democratic	1924–1933
Orel Busby	Democratic	1933–1937
D.N. Davison	Democratic	1937–1978
R. Hargrave	Nonpartisan	1978–2010
D.L. Combs	Nonpartisan	2011–present

Seat 9
Seat established in 1917
Seat filled by partisan election until 1968
Seat filled by non-partisan governor appointment after 1968
District made at-large in 2020
R. Brett	Democratic	1917–1919
J.T. Johnson	Democratic	1919–1925
F.S. Riley	Democratic	1925–1949
C.T. O'Neal	Republican	1949–1955
F.L. Jackson	Democratic	1955–1973
J.B. Doolin	Nonpartisan	1973–1992
J.M. Watt	Nonpartisan	1992–2017
R. Darby	Nonpartisan	2017–present

=== Timeline of justices ===
==== Since 1968 ====
Beginning in 1968 with an amendment to the Oklahoma Constitution approved in 1967, seats on the Supreme Court ceased being filled by partisan election and instead were filled by non-partisan appointment by the Governor of Oklahoma upon nomination by the Oklahoma Judicial Nominating Commission. Justices serve until the next general election following their appointment at which they are retained or rejected. If retained, they serve for an additional six-years until the next retention election.

Note 1: The blue vertical line denotes November 2026.
Note 2: Justices Lavender and Hodges were both appointed by Republican Governor Henry Bellmon in 1965 prior to the adoption of the new appointment method. Justice Lavender was a registered Republican while Justice Hodges was a registered Democrat.
Note 3: Justices Berry, Irwin, Williams, McInerney, Blackbird, Davison, and Jackson were elected as Democrats prior to the adoption of the new appointment method.
Bar key: Democratic appointee Republican appointee

==== Current court ====
The Winchester Court is the time since 2025 during which the Oklahoma Supreme Court has been led by Senior Justice James R. Winchester, who was appointed by Governor Frank Keating in 2000. Justice Winchester assumed the role of Senior Justice upon the retirement of Justice Yvonne Kauger.

Note: The blue vertical line denotes "now" (November 2026).
Bar key: Frank Keating appointee Brad Henry appointee Mary Fallin appointee Kevin Stitt appointee

== Notable cases ==
=== Prescott v. Oklahoma Capitol Preservation Commission ===
In Prescott v. Oklahoma Capitol Preservation Commission, Oklahoma citizens challenged the placement of a Ten Commandments Monument on the grounds of the Oklahoma State Capitol under Article 2, Section 5 of the Oklahoma Constitution. The court ruled, "We hold that the Ten Commandments Monument violates Article 2, Section 5 of the Oklahoma Constitution, is enjoined, and shall be removed". The 7–2 ruling overturns a decision by a district court judge who determined the monument could stay. It prompted calls by a handful of Republican lawmakers for impeachment of the justices who said the monument must be removed. Since the original monument was erected in 2012, several other groups have asked to put up their own monuments on the Capitol grounds. Among them is a group that wants to erect a 7-foot-tall statue that depicts Satan as Baphomet, a goat-headed figure with horns, wings and a long beard. A Hindu leader in Nevada, an animal rights group, and the Church of the Flying Spaghetti Monster also have made requests.
