= Denver Davison =

American judge (1891–1983)

- Born: October 9, 1891; Rich Hill, Missouri, U.S.
- Died: April 28, 1983 (aged 91); Oklahoma City, Oklahoma, U.S.
- Occupations: Attorney, Judge, Justice of the Oklahoma Supreme Court
- Years active: 1915-1958
- Known for: Served three terms as Chief Justice of the Oklahoma Supreme Court (more than any other person)

Denver Norton Davison (October 9, 1891 – April 28, 1983) was an American jurist from Oklahoma. Born in Rich Hill, Missouri, he moved to the Choctaw Nation in Indian Territory in 1906 to work in the coal mines there. He earned a law degree from the University of Oklahoma in 1915, and entered private practice, until he was appointed to the Oklahoma Supreme Court in 1937. When he died at age 91 on April 28, 1983, he had served for over 41 years, longer on the Oklahoma Supreme Court than any other justice until that time. He had also served an unprecedented three terms as chief justice. (Note: Davison had been appointed on August 7, 1937, replacing Justice Orel Busby, who had previously resigned.)

== Education and early career ==
Davison reportedly attended high school in Kansas City, Missouri, then studied at the University of Missouri for two years. (Note: One report stated that he graduated from University of Missouri in 1911.) During this time, he also worked in Kansas coal mines until he moved to Bokoshe, Oklahoma, in 1906, where it was said that he was paid $1.07 per day. (Note: Davison lived in Bokoshe from 1908 to 1913.)During World War I, he served for 18 months in the Army Signal Corps. After discharge, he became a charter member of the Coalgate American Legion Post.

He received a law degree from Oklahoma University (OU) in 1915. After graduating from OU, he moved to Lehigh, Oklahoma, where he practiced law and published the Lehigh News. Later he moved to Coalgate, Oklahoma. He practiced law there for 12 years and also served as county attorney. He then moved to Ada, where he practiced law for another 10 years.

== Oklahoma Supreme Court ==
Davison was appointed as an associate justice of the Oklahoma Supreme Court by Governor E. W. Marland on August 7, 1937. During his tenure, he was retained five times to serve as a Justice. (Note: As of 2019, he is the only person who has served as chief justice as many as three times.)

Justice Davison retired from the court in 1978. Judge Rudolph Hargrave was appointed to succeed him.

== Organization memberships ==
- Alpha Tau Omega, legal fraternity, Coalgate, Oklahoma
- B.P.O.E. (Elks); Coalgate
- Oak Hills Country Club; Ada
- American Legion (Ada Post)

== Death ==
Davison died on April 29, 1983. Survivors included his second wife, Lillian (née Wright); (Note: Davison married his first wife, Barbara Wilhelm, on September 7, 1916.) daughter-in-law, Susan N. Cason, grandchildren, Denver N. Davison and Trigg Yerby (all of Ada), Celeste Barringer ( of Ardmore)and Robert Cason (of Norman). His only son, Captain Denver B. Davison, was killed in WWII.

Davison's funeral was held at Crown Heights United Methodist Church in Oklahoma City, and he was interred at Rosedale Cemetery in Ada.

== Legacy ==
- Davison was an original member of the Will Rogers Memorial Commission and is credited with obtaining the Rogers family's approval of the memorial building.
- An office building constructed on the Oklahoma City capitol complex has been named for Denver Davison.
