= Hardy Summers =

American judge (1933–2012)

Edward Hardy Summers

Justice of the Oklahoma Supreme Court
- In office 1985–2004
- Preceded by: Don Barnes
- Succeeded by: James E. Edmondson

Personal details
- Born: Edward Hardy Summers; July 15, 1933 Muskogee, Oklahoma
- Died: September 12, 2012 (aged 79) Oklahoma City

Edward Hardy Summers (July 15, 1933 – September 12, 2012) was a justice of the Oklahoma Supreme Court from 1985 to 2003. Born in Muskogee, Oklahoma, he earned degrees in government and law at the University of Oklahoma. After graduation, he enlisted in the Judge Advocate General division of the U. S. Air Force. When he was discharged, he returned to Muskogee, where he served as Assistant County Attorney, before joining a private law firm, Fite, Robinson and Summers. In 1976, Governor David Boren appointed him District Judge for the 15th Judicial District. In 1985, Governor George Nigh appointed him to the Oklahoma Supreme Court. He served as chief justice from 1999 to 2000, and retired from the court in 2004. He died in Oklahoma City on September 12, 2012.

== Early life ==
Hardy Summers (Note: Summers hardly ever used his first name.) was born in Muskogee, Oklahoma on July 15, 1933. He was educated in public schools there. After finishing high school in 1951, he went to the University of Oklahoma, where he earned a B. A. degree in 1955 and the L. L. B. degree in 1957. He was note editor of the Oklahoma Law Review and admitted to the Order of the Coif. After the University, he enlisted in the U. S. Air Force, where he served three years in the Judge Advocate General division.

== Judicial career ==
In 1960, he returned to Muskogee, where he was hired as Assistant County Attorney. He joined the law office of Fite, Robinson and Summers in Muskogee in 1962, and worked there until 1974. Governor David Boren appointed him as Judge for the 15th Judicial District in 1976. As District Judge until 1985, he held court in Muskogee, Wagoner, Cherokee, Adair and Sequoyah counties. During that time, he was unopposed for reelection. Summers was elected president of the Oklahoma Judicial Conference in 1984. He served on the Court of Tax Review, the Committee for Uniform Civil Jury Instructions and chaired the Committee for Recodification of the Criminal Law and Procedure. In 1985, Governor George Nigh appointed him to fill a vacancy on the Oklahoma Supreme Court. He served as chief justice in 1999-2000, then remained as Associate Justice until he retired in 2004.

== Death ==
Summers died at his Oklahoma City home on September 12, 2012. He was buried on September 27, 2012 in Muskogee. A memorial service was held at First Unitarian Universalist Church in Oklahoma City on September 20, 2012.

== Honors ==
- He served as president of the Luther Bohanon American Inn of Court.
- In 2000 he was named "Distinguished Alumnus" by the OU College of Law.
