= Ralph B. Hodges =

American judge

Chief Justice of the Oklahoma Supreme Court
- In office 1977 – 1978, 1993 – 1994

Personal details
- Born: August 4, 1930 Anadarko, Oklahoma, United States
- Died: January 16, 2013 (aged 82) Oklahoma City

Ralph B. Hodges (August 4, 1930 – January 16, 2013) was born and raised in Anadarko, Oklahoma. He earned his J. D. degree from the University of Oklahoma. After serving as Bryan County Attorney and as District Judge, Hodges was appointed to the Oklahoma Supreme Court by Governor Henry Bellmon on April 19, 1965, as Associate Justice, where he would serve until his retirement from the Court in 2004. During that time he also served as Chief Justice of the Oklahoma Supreme Court from 1977 to 1978 and 1993–1994.

== Early life and education ==
Born in Anadarko, Oklahoma, to Dewey and Pearl Hodges on August 4, 1930, Hodges graduated from Anadarko High School in 1948, where he lettered in football and baseball. Hodges received his Bachelor of Arts from Oklahoma Baptist University in 1952 and his Juris Doctor from the University of Oklahoma in 1954.

== Career in law ==
After graduating from law school Hodges was in private practice in Durant, Oklahoma, from April 1954 until January 1957. From 1957 to 1959 Hodges served as the Bryan County Attorney before he was elected District Judge in 1958 and re-elected in 1962. (Note: In 1958, Hodges became the youngest man elected a District Judge in Oklahoma's history as a state.) (Note: During the years 1958-1962, Hodges employed a young woman named Deborah Barnes as staff attorney who had recently received a law degree from Oklahoma University. She was appointed to the Oklahoma Supreme Court as an associate justice in 2008.)

On April 19, 1965, Oklahoma Governor Henry Bellmon appointed Hodges as a justice of the Oklahoma Supreme Court. At the time of his appointment to the Court, Hodges was 34 years old, becoming the youngest Justice to serve on the Oklahoma Supreme Court since statehood. Hodges was retained (re-elected) to the Court in 1966, 1968, 1974, 1980, 1986, and 1992; serving two terms as chief justice from 1977–1978 and 1993–1994.

== "English-only petition" ==
In 2002, Justice Hodges wrote the majority opinion for Initiative Petition No. 366, which would have required that all official state business be conducted only in English. If passed at a general election, it would have banned using "...state money from being spent on translations for public documents or providing services in a different language." The majority opinion rejected the petition as an unconstitutional limitation on freedom of speech as well as infringing the rights of non English speaking citizens to interact with their government. As stated in Hodges' written opinion, "Restricting all governmental communications to English prevents citizens who are of limited English proficiency from effectively communicating with their government."

The proposed initiative could not be put on the general election ballot.

== Awards and honors ==
- In 1977, Justice Hodges was named Outstanding State Appellate Jurist by The Association of Trial Lawyers of America;
- Hodges served on the Board of Trustees for Oklahoma Baptist University from 1968 until 1971;
- In 1982, he received the first Media and Society Award given by the H.H. Herbert School of Journalism and Mass Communications at the University of Oklahoma. (Note: The Herbert School was later renamed the Gaylord School of Journalism and Mass Communications) for his work to allow cameras and microphones in Oklahoma courtrooms.

== Other activities ==
- As an active member of the First Baptist Church of Durant, Oklahoma, he was Chairman of the Board of Deacons in 1964-1965;
- He was a 33rd Degree Scottish Rite Mason;
- He was a former president of the Durant Kiwanis Club
- He was a former president of the Durant Junior Chamber of Commerce;
- He was a member of the Putnam City Baptist Church in Oklahoma City.

== Death ==
Justice Hodges died on January 16, 2013, at Bellevue Nursing Center. Family members who preceded him in death were his parents, his wife Janelle and his son Randy. He was survived by his six children (a son and a daughter he had from a previous marriage and Janelle's four daughters from a previous marriage) and twelve grandchildren. He was interred at Resurrection Memorial Cemetery in Oklahoma City.
