= John B. Doolin =

American judge

- Born: May 25, 1918; Alva, Oklahoma
- Died: March 16, 1993 (aged 74); Edmond, Oklahoma
- Occupations: Attorney, Judge
- Years active: 1947-1991
- Known for: Justice of the Oklahoma Supreme Court
- Notable work: Initiated concept of "Sovereignty Symposium"

John B. Doolin (May 25, 1918 – March 16, 1993) was an attorney in Oklahoma who served as a justice of the Oklahoma Supreme Court from 1972 until he retired May 1, 1991. Born and raised in Alva, Oklahoma, he graduated from Alva High School, then attended Northwestern Oklahoma State University and Culver College before spending four years at the University of Oklahoma, where he earned a degree in Business Administration. He then enlisted in the U.S. Army field artillery during World War II, becoming a captain and fighting in Southeast Asia.

After being discharged from military service, Doolin earned degrees in law from Colorado University and Oklahoma University. He had a private law practice in Alva from 1947 to 1963, then moved his practice to Lawton, Oklahoma, where he worked until Governor David Hall appointed him to fill a vacancy on the Oklahoma Supreme Court in 1973.

== Early life and education ==
Doolin was born in Alva, Oklahoma on May 25, 1918, where he graduated from the local high school. He attended Northwestern Oklahoma State University at Alva for a year and then spent one year at Culver Military Academy. He enrolled in the University of Oklahoma (OU) from 1937 to 1941, where he earned the Bachelor of Arts degree in Business Administration. Early in World War II, Doolin enlisted in the U. S. Army, attaining the rank of captain in the field artillery and fighting in the China/Burma Theater. After being discharged from military service, Doolin attended the University of Colorado, where he earned a Bachelor of Science degree, then transferred to University of Oklahoma, where he earned a law degree (LLB) in 1947.

Doolin had a private law practice in Alva until 1963, then moved to Lawton, where he remained until 1972, when Governor David Hall named him to fill a vacancy on the state supreme court. He replaced the retiring Floyd L. Jackson.

== Service on the Oklahoma Supreme Court ==
Doolin served for twenty years as a justice of the Oklahoma State Supreme Court, including his service as Chief Justice during 1987–89. He represented District 9, which includes Caddo, Canadian, Comanche, Cotton, Greer, Harmon, Jackson, Kiowa and Tillman counties.

== Death ==
John B Doolin died of a heart attack on March 16, 1993, in Edmond, Oklahoma. His survivors included the following children: John W. "Bill" Doolin of Lawton, Mary Louise Tremblay, Colleen Doolin, Martha Gillilan, all of Oklahoma City, Katherine "Kit" Doolin of Chicago and Carole Kyle of Edmond. He also had four stepchildren: Louis, John, Kris and Kathy; and 20 grandchildren. He was married twice, to Katherine and Marilyn, both of whom preceded him in death. His son, Tom, and a granddaughter also died before him.
