= Oklahoma Bar Association =

Bar Association

- Type: Legal Society
- Headquarters: Oklahoma City, OK
- Location: United States
- Members: 16,417 in 2012; 3,724 out of state)
- Website: http://www.okbar.org/

The Oklahoma Bar Association (OBA) is the integrated (mandatory) bar association of the U.S. state of Oklahoma.

== History ==
The Oklahoma Territory Bar Association and the Indian Territory Bar Association merged in 1904 to form the Oklahoma Bar Association. After statehood in November 1907, the Oklahoma Legislature recognized the Association; however, it repealed the enacting legislation in 1938. In 1939 the Oklahoma Supreme Court reorganized the association and made membership mandatory to practice law in Oklahoma.

== Structure ==
The Oklahoma Bar Association is governed by a 17-member Board of Governors, whose members are lawyers elected by OBA members and meet monthly. Day-to-day operations are managed by an Executive Director and a staff of both attorneys and non-attorneys.

OBA enforces the rule that Oklahoma lawyers must complete 12 credits of Continuing Legal Education every year.

The monthly Oklahoma Bar Journal, established in 1930, is OBA's official member publication, and is distributed 10 months out of the year.

Although an arm of the Oklahoma Supreme Court, OBA does not receive any appropriations from the Oklahoma Legislature or other public or tax-related revenues.

== See also ==
- Oklahoma District Attorneys Council
