= List of justices of the Oklahoma Supreme Court =

Following is a list of justices of the Oklahoma Supreme Court. The court was established when Oklahoma achieved statehood in 1907, and was initially composed of five justices, with the state divided into a corresponding number of judicial districts. In 1917, the court was expanded to nine justices, with the judicial districts being redrawn accordingly, and with the seats for the fourth and fives judicial districts being switched.

== Current membership ==
The justices of the Oklahoma Supreme Court are:

Justice	District	Appointed	Governor	Law school	Birth city
James R. Winchester	5th	2000	Frank Keating	Oklahoma City University	Clinton, Oklahoma
James E. Edmondson	7th	2003	Brad Henry	Georgetown University	Kansas City, Missouri
Doug Combs	8th	2010	Brad Henry	Oklahoma City University	Shawnee, Oklahoma
Noma Gurich	3rd	2011	Brad Henry	University of Oklahoma	South Bend, Indiana
Richard Darby	9th	2018	Mary Fallin	University of Oklahoma	Altus, Oklahoma
Dustin Rowe	2nd	2019	Kevin Stitt	University of Oklahoma	Ada, Oklahoma
M. John Kane IV	1st	2019	Kevin Stitt	University of Oklahoma	Pawhuska, Oklahoma
Dana Kuehn	6th	2021	Kevin Stitt	University of Tulsa	Owasso, Oklahoma
Travis Jett	4th	2025	Kevin Stitt	Georgetown University	Slapout, Oklahoma

== List of former justices ==
Judge	Began active service	Ended active service	District	Notes
John B. Turner	1907	1918	District 1	
Robert L. Williams	1907	1914	District 2	first Chief Justice (1908–1913); Resigned 3-10-1914; Later third Governor of Oklahoma
Matthew John Kane	1908	1923	District 3	Chief Justice 1909–12; died January 2, 1924
Jesse James Dunn	1907	1913	District 4	Resigned September 1, 1913
Samuel W. Hayes	1907	1914	District 5	Resigned April 7, 1914.
Robert H. Loofbourrow	1913	1915	District 4	Appointed September 1, 1913
Stillwell H. Russell	1914	1914	District 2	died May 16, 1914
W. R. Bleakmore	1914	1914	District 2	appointed May 26, 1914
Summers T. Hardy	1914	1919	District 2	Elected to an unexpired term; resigned May 1, 1919
J. F. Sharp	1914	1919	District 4/5	resigned October 1, 1919
F. E. Riddle	1914	1914	District 5	Appointed April 7, 1914
G. A. Brown	1914	1915	District 5	Died October 25, 1915
Charles M. Thacker	1915	1918	District 5/4	Appointed November 2, 1915; died February 17, 1918
J. H. Miley	1917	1918	District 6	Appointed March 31, 1917
Thomas H. Owen	1917	1920	District 7	Appointed March 31, 1917, elected 1918, resigned May 1, 1920
Robert M. Rainey	1917	1920	District 8	Appointed March 31, 1917; Chief Justice 1920–21
Rutherford Brett	1917	1918	District 9	Appointed March 31, 1917.
John H. Pitchford	1918	1923	District 1	Died March 2, 1923
B. L. Tisinger	1918	1918	District 4	appointed March 5, 1918
John B. Harrison	1918	1928	District 4	
Neil E. McNeil	1918	1924	District 6	
Frank M. Bailey	1919	1920	District 5	Appointed October 1, 1919
John T. Johnson	1919	1925	District 9	Chief Justice 1923 & 1925; presided over impeachment of Governor Walton in 1922
R. W. Higgins	1919	1920	District 2	Appointed May 7, 1919
Franklin Elmore Kennamer	1920	1924	District 8	Appointed to Oklahoma Supreme Court in 1920. Resigned April 1, 1924 to become Federal Judge for Northern District of Oklahoma
C. H. Elting	1920	1922	District 2	Died December 3, 1922
George M. Nicholson	1920	1926	District 5	Chief Justice 1925–27
George S. Ramsey	1920	1920	District 7	Appointed May 1, 1920; resigned November 5, 1920
John R. Miller	1920	1922	District 7	Elected to an unexpired term
William A. Collier	1920	1920	District 7	Appointed November 5, 1920
Fred P. Branson	1922	1929	District 7	Chief Justice 1927–29
Charles B. Cochrane	1922	1924	District 2	Appointed December 6, 1922; resigned May 1, 1924
Charles W. Mason	1923	1931	District 1	Appointed; Chief Justice 1929–31
J. D. Lydick	1924	1924	District 3	Appointed January 7, 1924
Frank L. Warren	1924	1924	District 8	Appointed April 1, 1924
Eugene Lester	1924	1931	District 2	Elected to an unexpired term; Chief Justice, 1931
Albert C. Hunt	1924; 1955	1931; 1956	District 6 District 3	Elected to Supreme Court in 1924; Appointed October 14, 1955 to replace the late Justice Ben Arnold; died August 26, 1956
Fletcher S. Riley	1924	1948	District 9	
James H. Gordon	1924	1932	District 2	Appointed May 1, 1924.
James I. Phelps	1925–29	1935	District 3	Elected to an unexpired term
James Waddey Clark	1925	1933	District 8	
Robert A. Hefner	1926	1932	District 5	
James B. Cullison	1928	1934	District 3	
Charles Swindall	1928	1934	District 4	
James B. Cullison	1929	1931	District 3	
Thomas G. Andrews	1929	1935	District 7	
J. H. Langley	1930; 1933	1931; 1934	District 1	Resigned after serving 1 month in first term; won election in 1933
W. H. Kornegay	1931	1932	District 1	Appointed February 2, 1931
Edwin R. McNeill	1931	1937	District 6	Chief Justice 1936–37
J. H. Langley	1931	1931	District 1	Resigned February 2, 1931
Samuel Earl Welch	1932	1965	District 2	Resigned in 1965
Wayne W. Bayless	1932	1948	District 1	Elected to an unexpired term of J. H. Langley
Monroe Osborn	1932	1947	District 5	Died June 20, 1947
Orel Busby	1932	1937	District 8	Resigned August 7, 1937
N. S. Corn	1934	1958	District 4	Impeached; convicted of bribery and sent to prison
Thomas L. Gibson	1934	1952	District 7	
Denver Davison	1937	1978	District 8	Appointed August 7, 1937, replacing Justice Orel Busby; retired August 8, 1978, replaced by Justice Douglas Combs;
Harris L. Danner	1938	1940	District 3	Appointed December 1, 1938, resigned October 10, 1940
Sam Neff	1940	1956	District 3	Appointed October 10, 1940
Ben Arnold	1941	1953	District 3	Chief Justice 1951–1953; died September 30, 1955
John E. Luttrell	1947	1951	District 5	Appointed July 1, 1947; resigned August 13, 1951
Napoleon B. Johnson	1948	1965	District 1	Impeached by a Special Court of Impeachment, May 13, 1965; replaced by Judge Robert E. Lavender.
Harry L. S. Halley	1948	1966	District 6	
George Bingaman	1951	1952	District 5	Appointed August 13, 1951
W. H. Blackbird	1952	1972	District 7	Retired December 1, 1971
Ben T. Williams	1952	1982	District 5	Appointed in 1952; died in office January 11, 1982. Served 2 terms as
Floyd L. Jackson	1954	1973	District 9	Retired January 8, 1973
W. A. Carlile	1956	1958	District 3	Appointed September 17, 1956
William A. Berry	1958	1978	District 3	Resigned November 20, 1978
Pat Irwin	1958	1983	District 4	Chief Justice (1969–70) and (1981–82); Retired December 1983; appointed Magistrate of U.S. District Court for Western Oklahoma (1983–1991); died in Edmond, OK; 1993
Ralph B. Hodges	1965	2004	District 2	Appointed April 20, 1965; Chief Justice 1977–1978 and 1993–1994 (2 terms)
Robert E. Lavender	1965	2007	District 1	Chief Justice 1979 – 1981 Retired from Court in 2007; replaced by Justice John F. Reif;
Rooney McInerney	1966	1972	District 6	Resigned September 1, 1972; replaced by Judge Robert D. Simms.
Don Barnes	1972	1985	District 7	Appointed January 4, 1972; retired January 1985
Robert D. Simms	1972	1999	District 6	Appointed October 2, 1972; Chief Justice 1985 – 1986
John B. Doolin	1973	1992	District 9	Appointed January 8, 1973, replacing Justice Floyd L. Jackson; served as chief justice 1987-8; retired May 1, 1992
Marian P. Opala	1978	2010	District 3	Appointed November 21, 1978; Chief Justice 1991–1992; died in office October 10, 2010
Rudolph Hargrave	1978	2010	District 8	Appointed October 10, 1978, replacing Justice Davison; Chief Justice 1979 – 1981; retired effective December 31, 2010; Replaced by Douglas L. Combs
Alma Wilson	1982	1999	District 5	Appointed February 9, 1982; Chief Justice 1995–1997
Yvonne Kauger	1984	2024	District 4	Appointed March 11, 1984; Chief Justice 1997–1999; first justice ever defeated in retention election (November 5, 2024)
Hardy Summers	1985	2003	District 7	Appointed February 1, 1985, replacing Justice Don Barnes; Chief Justice 1999–2000
Joseph M. Watt	1992	2017	District 9	Appointed June 1, 1992; Chief Justice 2003–2007; replaced by Judge Richard Darby in April, 2018
Daniel J. Boudreau	1999	2004	District 6	Resigned after serving 5 years to teach law at University of Tulsa law school
Steven W. Taylor	2004	2016	District 2	Chief Justice 2011–2013
Tom Colbert	2004	2021	District 6	Chief Justice 2013–2015
John F. Reif	2007	2019	District 1	Chief Justice 2015–2016; retired in April 2019
Patrick Wyrick	2017	2019	District 2	Appointed February 9, 2017, Resigned to become federal judge on April 10, 2019

== Table ==
Year	Seat 1	Seat 2	Seat 3	Seat 4	Seat 5	Seat 6	Seat 7	Seat 8	Seat 9
1907	John B. Turner	Robert L. Williams	Matthew John Kane	Jesse James Dunn	Samuel W. Hayes	No Seat	No Seat	No Seat	No Seat
1908	John B. Turner	Robert L. Williams	Matthew John Kane	Jesse James Dunn	Samuel W. Hayes	No Seat	No Seat	No Seat	No Seat
1909	John B. Turner	Robert L. Williams	Matthew John Kane	Jesse James Dunn	Samuel W. Hayes	No Seat	No Seat	No Seat	No Seat
1910	John B. Turner	Robert L. Williams	Matthew John Kane	Jesse James Dunn	Samuel W. Hayes	No Seat	No Seat	No Seat	No Seat
1911	John B. Turner	Robert L. Williams	Matthew John Kane	Jesse James Dunn	Samuel W. Hayes	No Seat	No Seat	No Seat	No Seat
1912	John B. Turner	Robert L. Williams	Matthew John Kane	Jesse James Dunn	Samuel W. Hayes	No Seat	No Seat	No Seat	No Seat
1913	John B. Turner	Robert L. Williams	Matthew John Kane	Jesse James Dunn	Samuel W. Hayes	No Seat	No Seat	No Seat	No Seat
1914	John B. Turner	Robert L. Williams	Matthew John Kane	J. F. Sharp	Samuel W. Hayes	No Seat	No Seat	No Seat	No Seat
1915	John B. Turner	Summers T. Hardy	Matthew John Kane	J. F. Sharp	G. A. Brown	No Seat	No Seat	No Seat	No Seat
1916	John B. Turner	Summers T. Hardy	Matthew John Kane	J. F. Sharp	Charles M. Thacker	No Seat	No Seat	No Seat	No Seat
1917	John B. Turner	Summers T. Hardy	Matthew John Kane	Charles M. Thacker	J. F. Sharp	J. H. Miley	Thomas H. Owen	Robert M. Rainey	Rutherford Brett
1918	John B. Turner	Summers T. Hardy	Matthew John Kane	Charles M. Thacker	J. F. Sharp	J. H. Miley	Thomas H. Owen	Robert M. Rainey	Rutherford Brett
1919	John H. Pitchford	Summers T. Hardy	Matthew John Kane	John B. Harrison	J. F. Sharp	Neil E. McNeil	Thomas H. Owen	Robert M. Rainey	John T. Johnson
1920	John H. Pitchford	R. W. Higgins	Matthew John Kane	John B. Harrison	Frank M. Bailey	Neil E. McNeil	Thomas H. Owen	Robert M. Rainey	John T. Johnson
1921	John H. Pitchford	C. H. Elting	Matthew John Kane	John B. Harrison	Frank M. Bailey	Neil E. McNeil	John R. Miller	Franklin Elmore Kennamer	John T. Johnson
1922	John H. Pitchford	C. H. Elting	Matthew John Kane	John B. Harrison	George M. Nicholson	Neil E. McNeil	John R. Miller	Franklin Elmore Kennamer	John T. Johnson
1923	John H. Pitchford	Charles B. Cochrane	Matthew John Kane	John B. Harrison	George M. Nicholson	Neil E. McNeil	Fred P. Branson	Franklin Elmore Kennamer	John T. Johnson
1924	Charles W. Mason	Charles B. Cochrane	James I. Phelps	John B. Harrison	George M. Nicholson	Neil E. McNeil	Fred P. Branson	Franklin Elmore Kennamer	Fletcher S. Riley
1925	Charles W. Mason	Eugene Lester	James I. Phelps	John B. Harrison	George M. Nicholson	Albert C. Hunt	Fred P. Branson	James Waddey Clark	Fletcher S. Riley
1926	Charles W. Mason	Eugene Lester	James I. Phelps	John B. Harrison	George M. Nicholson	Albert C. Hunt	Fred P. Branson	James Waddey Clark	Fletcher S. Riley
1927	Charles W. Mason	Eugene Lester	James I. Phelps	John B. Harrison	Robert A. Hefner	Albert C. Hunt	Fred P. Branson	James Waddey Clark	Fletcher S. Riley
1928	Charles W. Mason	Eugene Lester	James I. Phelps	John B. Harrison	Robert A. Hefner	Albert C. Hunt	Fred P. Branson	James Waddey Clark	Fletcher S. Riley
1929	Charles W. Mason	Eugene Lester	James I. Phelps	John B. Harrison	Robert A. Hefner	Albert C. Hunt	Fred P. Branson	James Waddey Clark	Fletcher S. Riley
1930	Charles W. Mason	Eugene Lester	James B. Cullison	Charles Swindall	Robert A. Hefner	Albert C. Hunt	Thomas G. Andrews	James Waddey Clark	Fletcher S. Riley
1931	J. H. Langley	Eugene Lester	James B. Cullison	Charles Swindall	Robert A. Hefner	Edwin R. McNeill	Thomas G. Andrews	James Waddey Clark	Fletcher S. Riley
1932	W. H. Kornegay	Samuel Earl Welch	James B. Cullison	Charles Swindall	Robert A. Hefner	Edwin R. McNeill	Thomas G. Andrews	James Waddey Clark	Fletcher S. Riley
1933	J. H. Langley	Samuel Earl Welch	James B. Cullison	Charles Swindall	Monroe Osborn	Edwin R. McNeill	Thomas G. Andrews	Orel Busby	Fletcher S. Riley
1934	J. H. Langley	Samuel Earl Welch	James B. Cullison	Charles Swindall	Monroe Osborn	Edwin R. McNeill	Thomas G. Andrews	Orel Busby	Fletcher S. Riley
1935	Wayne W. Bayless	Samuel Earl Welch	James B. Cullison	Charles Swindall	Monroe Osborn	Edwin R. McNeill	Thomas G. Andrews	Orel Busby	Fletcher S. Riley
1936	Wayne W. Bayless	Samuel Earl Welch	James I. Phelps	N. S. Corn	Monroe Osborn	Edwin R. McNeill	Thomas L. Gibson	Orel Busby	Fletcher S. Riley
1937	Wayne W. Bayless	Samuel Earl Welch	James I. Phelps	N. S. Corn	Monroe Osborn	Edwin R. McNeill	Thomas L. Gibson	Denver Davison	Fletcher S. Riley
1938	Wayne W. Bayless	Samuel Earl Welch	James I. Phelps	N. S. Corn	Monroe Osborn	T. H. Hurst	Thomas L. Gibson	Denver Davison	Fletcher S. Riley
1939	Wayne W. Bayless	Samuel Earl Welch	Harris L. Danner	N. S. Corn	Monroe Osborn	T. H. Hurst	Thomas L. Gibson	Denver Davison	Fletcher S. Riley
1940	Wayne W. Bayless	Samuel Earl Welch	Harris L. Danner	N. S. Corn	Monroe Osborn	T. H. Hurst	Thomas L. Gibson	Denver Davison	Fletcher S. Riley
1941	Wayne W. Bayless	Samuel Earl Welch	Ben Arnold	N. S. Corn	Monroe Osborn	T. H. Hurst	Thomas L. Gibson	Denver Davison	Fletcher S. Riley
1942	Wayne W. Bayless	Samuel Earl Welch	Ben Arnold	N. S. Corn	Monroe Osborn	T. H. Hurst	Thomas L. Gibson	Denver Davison	Fletcher S. Riley
1943	Wayne W. Bayless	Samuel Earl Welch	Ben Arnold	N. S. Corn	Monroe Osborn	T. H. Hurst	Thomas L. Gibson	Denver Davison	Fletcher S. Riley
1944	Wayne W. Bayless	Samuel Earl Welch	Ben Arnold	N. S. Corn	Monroe Osborn	T. H. Hurst	Thomas L. Gibson	Denver Davison	Fletcher S. Riley
1945	Wayne W. Bayless	Samuel Earl Welch	Ben Arnold	N. S. Corn	Monroe Osborn	T. H. Hurst	Thomas L. Gibson	Denver Davison	Fletcher S. Riley
1946	Wayne W. Bayless	Samuel Earl Welch	Ben Arnold	N. S. Corn	Monroe Osborn	T. H. Hurst	Thomas L. Gibson	Denver Davison	Fletcher S. Riley
1947	Wayne W. Bayless	Samuel Earl Welch	Ben Arnold	N. S. Corn	John E. Luttrell	T. H. Hurst	Thomas L. Gibson	Denver Davison	Fletcher S. Riley
1948	Wayne W. Bayless	Samuel Earl Welch	Ben Arnold	N. S. Corn	John E. Luttrell	T. H. Hurst	Thomas L. Gibson	Denver Davison	Fletcher S. Riley
1949	Napoleon B. Johnson	Samuel Earl Welch	Ben Arnold	N. S. Corn	John E. Luttrell	Harry L. S. Halley	Thomas L. Gibson	Denver Davison	C. T. O'Neal
1950	Napoleon B. Johnson	Samuel Earl Welch	Ben Arnold	N. S. Corn	John E. Luttrell	Harry L. S. Halley	Thomas L. Gibson	Denver Davison	C. T. O'Neal
1951	Napoleon B. Johnson	Samuel Earl Welch	Ben Arnold	N. S. Corn	George Bingaman	Harry L. S. Halley	Thomas L. Gibson	Denver Davison	C. T. O'Neal
1952	Napoleon B. Johnson	Samuel Earl Welch	Ben Arnold	N. S. Corn	Ben T. Williams	Harry L. S. Halley	W. H. Blackbird	Denver Davison	C. T. O'Neal
1953	Napoleon B. Johnson	Samuel Earl Welch	Ben Arnold	N. S. Corn	Ben T. Williams	Harry L. S. Halley	W. H. Blackbird	Denver Davison	C. T. O'Neal
1954	Napoleon B. Johnson	Samuel Earl Welch	Ben Arnold	N. S. Corn	Ben T. Williams	Harry L. S. Halley	W. H. Blackbird	Denver Davison	Floyd L. Jackson
1955	Napoleon B. Johnson	Samuel Earl Welch	Ben Arnold	N. S. Corn	Ben T. Williams	Harry L. S. Halley	W. H. Blackbird	Denver Davison	Floyd L. Jackson
1956	Napoleon B. Johnson	Samuel Earl Welch	Albert C. Hunt	N. S. Corn	Ben T. Williams	Harry L. S. Halley	W. H. Blackbird	Denver Davison	Floyd L. Jackson
1957	Napoleon B. Johnson	Samuel Earl Welch	W. A. Carlile	N. S. Corn	Ben T. Williams	Harry L. S. Halley	W. H. Blackbird	Denver Davison	Floyd L. Jackson
1958	Napoleon B. Johnson	Samuel Earl Welch	W. A. Carlile	N. S. Corn	Ben T. Williams	Harry L. S. Halley	W. H. Blackbird	Denver Davison	Floyd L. Jackson
1959	Napoleon B. Johnson	Samuel Earl Welch	William A. Berry	N. S. Corn	Ben T. Williams	Harry L. S. Halley	W. H. Blackbird	Denver Davison	Floyd L. Jackson
1960	Napoleon B. Johnson	Samuel Earl Welch	William A. Berry	Pat Irwin	Ben T. Williams	Harry L. S. Halley	W. H. Blackbird	Denver Davison	Floyd L. Jackson
1961	Napoleon B. Johnson	Samuel Earl Welch	William A. Berry	Pat Irwin	Ben T. Williams	Harry L. S. Halley	W. H. Blackbird	Denver Davison	Floyd L. Jackson
1962	Napoleon B. Johnson	Samuel Earl Welch	William A. Berry	Pat Irwin	Ben T. Williams	Harry L. S. Halley	W. H. Blackbird	Denver Davison	Floyd L. Jackson
1963	Napoleon B. Johnson	Samuel Earl Welch	William A. Berry	Pat Irwin	Ben T. Williams	Harry L. S. Halley	W. H. Blackbird	Denver Davison	Floyd L. Jackson
1964	Napoleon B. Johnson	Samuel Earl Welch	William A. Berry	Pat Irwin	Ben T. Williams	Harry L. S. Halley	W. H. Blackbird	Denver Davison	Floyd L. Jackson
1965	Napoleon B. Johnson	Samuel Earl Welch	William A. Berry	Pat Irwin	Ben T. Williams	Harry L. S. Halley	W. H. Blackbird	Denver Davison	Floyd L. Jackson
1966	Robert E. Lavender	Ralph B. Hodges	William A. Berry	Pat Irwin	Ben T. Williams	Harry L. S. Halley	W. H. Blackbird	Denver Davison	Floyd L. Jackson
1967	Robert E. Lavender	Ralph B. Hodges	William A. Berry	Pat Irwin	Ben T. Williams	Rooney McInerney	W. H. Blackbird	Denver Davison	Floyd L. Jackson
1968	Robert E. Lavender	Ralph B. Hodges	William A. Berry	Pat Irwin	Ben T. Williams	Rooney McInerney	W. H. Blackbird	Denver Davison	Floyd L. Jackson
1969	Robert E. Lavender	Ralph B. Hodges	William A. Berry	Pat Irwin	Ben T. Williams	Rooney McInerney	W. H. Blackbird	Denver Davison	Floyd L. Jackson
1970	Robert E. Lavender	Ralph B. Hodges	William A. Berry	Pat Irwin	Ben T. Williams	Rooney McInerney	W. H. Blackbird	Denver Davison	Floyd L. Jackson
1971	Robert E. Lavender	Ralph B. Hodges	William A. Berry	Pat Irwin	Ben T. Williams	Rooney McInerney	W. H. Blackbird	Denver Davison	Floyd L. Jackson
1972	Robert E. Lavender	Ralph B. Hodges	William A. Berry	Pat Irwin	Ben T. Williams	Rooney McInerney	Don Barnes	Denver Davison	Floyd L. Jackson
1973	Robert E. Lavender	Ralph B. Hodges	William A. Berry	Pat Irwin	Ben T. Williams	Robert D. Simms	Don Barnes	Denver Davison	John B. Doolin
1974	Robert E. Lavender	Ralph B. Hodges	William A. Berry	Pat Irwin	Ben T. Williams	Robert D. Simms	Don Barnes	Denver Davison	John B. Doolin
1975	Robert E. Lavender	Ralph B. Hodges	William A. Berry	Pat Irwin	Ben T. Williams	Robert D. Simms	Don Barnes	Denver Davison	John B. Doolin
1976	Robert E. Lavender	Ralph B. Hodges	William A. Berry	Pat Irwin	Ben T. Williams	Robert D. Simms	Don Barnes	Denver Davison	John B. Doolin
1977	Robert E. Lavender	Ralph B. Hodges	William A. Berry	Pat Irwin	Ben T. Williams	Robert D. Simms	Don Barnes	Denver Davison	John B. Doolin
1978	Robert E. Lavender	Ralph B. Hodges	William A. Berry	Pat Irwin	Ben T. Williams	Robert D. Simms	Don Barnes	Rudolph Hargrave	John B. Doolin
1979	Robert E. Lavender	Ralph B. Hodges	Marian P. Opala	Pat Irwin	Ben T. Williams	Robert D. Simms	Don Barnes	Rudolph Hargrave	John B. Doolin
1980	Robert E. Lavender	Ralph B. Hodges	Marian P. Opala	Pat Irwin	Ben T. Williams	Robert D. Simms	Don Barnes	Rudolph Hargrave	John B. Doolin
1981	Robert E. Lavender	Ralph B. Hodges	Marian P. Opala	Pat Irwin	Ben T. Williams	Robert D. Simms	Don Barnes	Rudolph Hargrave	John B. Doolin
1982	Robert E. Lavender	Ralph B. Hodges	Marian P. Opala	Pat Irwin	Alma Wilson	Robert D. Simms	Don Barnes	Rudolph Hargrave	John B. Doolin
1983	Robert E. Lavender	Ralph B. Hodges	Marian P. Opala	Pat Irwin	Alma Wilson	Robert D. Simms	Don Barnes	Rudolph Hargrave	John B. Doolin
1984	Robert E. Lavender	Ralph B. Hodges	Marian P. Opala	Yvonne Kauger	Alma Wilson	Robert D. Simms	Don Barnes	Rudolph Hargrave	John B. Doolin
1985	Robert E. Lavender	Ralph B. Hodges	Marian P. Opala	Yvonne Kauger	Alma Wilson	Robert D. Simms	Don Barnes	Rudolph Hargrave	John B. Doolin
1986	Robert E. Lavender	Ralph B. Hodges	Marian P. Opala	Yvonne Kauger	Alma Wilson	Robert D. Simms	Hardy Summers	Rudolph Hargrave	John B. Doolin
1987	Robert E. Lavender	Ralph B. Hodges	Marian P. Opala	Yvonne Kauger	Alma Wilson	Robert D. Simms	Hardy Summers	Rudolph Hargrave	John B. Doolin
1988	Robert E. Lavender	Ralph B. Hodges	Marian P. Opala	Yvonne Kauger	Alma Wilson	Robert D. Simms	Hardy Summers	Rudolph Hargrave	John B. Doolin
1989	Robert E. Lavender	Ralph B. Hodges	Marian P. Opala	Yvonne Kauger	Alma Wilson	Robert D. Simms	Hardy Summers	Rudolph Hargrave	John B. Doolin
1990	Robert E. Lavender	Ralph B. Hodges	Marian P. Opala	Yvonne Kauger	Alma Wilson	Robert D. Simms	Hardy Summers	Rudolph Hargrave	John B. Doolin
1991	Robert E. Lavender	Ralph B. Hodges	Marian P. Opala	Yvonne Kauger	Alma Wilson	Robert D. Simms	Hardy Summers	Rudolph Hargrave	John B. Doolin
1992	Robert E. Lavender	Ralph B. Hodges	Marian P. Opala	Yvonne Kauger	Alma Wilson	Robert D. Simms	Hardy Summers	Rudolph Hargrave	Joseph M. Watt
1993	Robert E. Lavender	Ralph B. Hodges	Marian P. Opala	Yvonne Kauger	Alma Wilson	Robert D. Simms	Hardy Summers	Rudolph Hargrave	Joseph M. Watt
1994	Robert E. Lavender	Ralph B. Hodges	Marian P. Opala	Yvonne Kauger	Alma Wilson	Robert D. Simms	Hardy Summers	Rudolph Hargrave	Joseph M. Watt
1995	Robert E. Lavender	Ralph B. Hodges	Marian P. Opala	Yvonne Kauger	Alma Wilson	Robert D. Simms	Hardy Summers	Rudolph Hargrave	Joseph M. Watt
1996	Robert E. Lavender	Ralph B. Hodges	Marian P. Opala	Yvonne Kauger	Alma Wilson	Robert D. Simms	Hardy Summers	Rudolph Hargrave	Joseph M. Watt
1997	Robert E. Lavender	Ralph B. Hodges	Marian P. Opala	Yvonne Kauger	Alma Wilson	Robert D. Simms	Hardy Summers	Rudolph Hargrave	Joseph M. Watt
1998	Robert E. Lavender	Ralph B. Hodges	Marian P. Opala	Yvonne Kauger	Alma Wilson	Robert D. Simms	Hardy Summers	Rudolph Hargrave	Joseph M. Watt
1999	Robert E. Lavender	Ralph B. Hodges	Marian P. Opala	Yvonne Kauger	Alma Wilson	Daniel J. Boudreau	Hardy Summers	Rudolph Hargrave	Joseph M. Watt
2000	Robert E. Lavender	Ralph B. Hodges	Marian P. Opala	Yvonne Kauger	James R. Winchester	Daniel J. Boudreau	Hardy Summers	Rudolph Hargrave	Joseph M. Watt
2001	Robert E. Lavender	Ralph B. Hodges	Marian P. Opala	Yvonne Kauger	James R. Winchester	Daniel J. Boudreau	Hardy Summers	Rudolph Hargrave	Joseph M. Watt
2002	Robert E. Lavender	Ralph B. Hodges	Marian P. Opala	Yvonne Kauger	James R. Winchester	Daniel J. Boudreau	Hardy Summers	Rudolph Hargrave	Joseph M. Watt
2003	Robert E. Lavender	Ralph B. Hodges	Marian P. Opala	Yvonne Kauger	James R. Winchester	Daniel J. Boudreau	James E. Edmondson	Rudolph Hargrave	Joseph M. Watt
2004	Robert E. Lavender	Ralph B. Hodges	Marian P. Opala	Yvonne Kauger	James R. Winchester	Tom Colbert	James E. Edmondson	Rudolph Hargrave	Joseph M. Watt
2005	Robert E. Lavender	Steven W. Taylor	Marian P. Opala	Yvonne Kauger	James R. Winchester	Tom Colbert	James E. Edmondson	Rudolph Hargrave	Joseph M. Watt
2006	Robert E. Lavender	Steven W. Taylor	Marian P. Opala	Yvonne Kauger	James R. Winchester	Tom Colbert	James E. Edmondson	Rudolph Hargrave	Joseph M. Watt
2007	Robert E. Lavender	Steven W. Taylor	Marian P. Opala	Yvonne Kauger	James R. Winchester	Tom Colbert	James E. Edmondson	Rudolph Hargrave	Joseph M. Watt
2008	John F. Reif	Steven W. Taylor	Marian P. Opala	Yvonne Kauger	James R. Winchester	Tom Colbert	James E. Edmondson	Rudolph Hargrave	Joseph M. Watt
2009	John F. Reif	Steven W. Taylor	Marian P. Opala	Yvonne Kauger	James R. Winchester	Tom Colbert	James E. Edmondson	Rudolph Hargrave	Joseph M. Watt
2010	John F. Reif	Steven W. Taylor	Marian P. Opala	Yvonne Kauger	James R. Winchester	Tom Colbert	James E. Edmondson	Rudolph Hargrave	Joseph M. Watt
2011	John F. Reif	Steven W. Taylor	Noma Gurich	Yvonne Kauger	James R. Winchester	Tom Colbert	James E. Edmondson	Doug Combs	Joseph M. Watt
2012	John F. Reif	Steven W. Taylor	Noma Gurich	Yvonne Kauger	James R. Winchester	Tom Colbert	James E. Edmondson	Doug Combs	Joseph M. Watt
2013	John F. Reif	Steven W. Taylor	Noma Gurich	Yvonne Kauger	James R. Winchester	Tom Colbert	James E. Edmondson	Doug Combs	Joseph M. Watt
2014	John F. Reif	Steven W. Taylor	Noma Gurich	Yvonne Kauger	James R. Winchester	Tom Colbert	James E. Edmondson	Doug Combs	Joseph M. Watt
2015	John F. Reif	Steven W. Taylor	Noma Gurich	Yvonne Kauger	James R. Winchester	Tom Colbert	James E. Edmondson	Doug Combs	Joseph M. Watt
2016	John F. Reif	Steven W. Taylor	Noma Gurich	Yvonne Kauger	James R. Winchester	Tom Colbert	James E. Edmondson	Doug Combs	Joseph M. Watt
2017	John F. Reif	Patrick Wyrick	Noma Gurich	Yvonne Kauger	James R. Winchester	Tom Colbert	James E. Edmondson	Doug Combs	Joseph M. Watt
2018	John F. Reif	Patrick Wyrick	Noma Gurich	Yvonne Kauger	James R. Winchester	Tom Colbert	James E. Edmondson	Doug Combs	Richard Darby
2019	M. John Kane IV	Dustin Rowe	Noma Gurich	Yvonne Kauger	James R. Winchester	Tom Colbert	James E. Edmondson	Doug Combs	Richard Darby
2020	M. John Kane IV	Dustin Rowe	Noma Gurich	Yvonne Kauger	James R. Winchester	Tom Colbert	James E. Edmondson	Doug Combs	Richard Darby
2021	M. John Kane IV	Dustin Rowe	Noma Gurich	Yvonne Kauger	James R. Winchester	Dana Kuehn	James E. Edmondson	Doug Combs	Richard Darby
2022	M. John Kane IV	Dustin Rowe	Noma Gurich	Yvonne Kauger	James R. Winchester	Dana Kuehn	James E. Edmondson	Doug Combs	Richard Darby
2023	M. John Kane IV	Dustin Rowe	Noma Gurich	Yvonne Kauger	James R. Winchester	Dana Kuehn	James E. Edmondson	Doug Combs	Richard Darby
2024	M. John Kane IV	Dustin Rowe	Noma Gurich	Yvonne Kauger	James R. Winchester	Dana Kuehn	James E. Edmondson	Doug Combs	Richard Darby
2025	M. John Kane IV	Dustin Rowe	Noma Gurich	Travis Jett	James R. Winchester	Dana Kuehn	James E. Edmondson	Doug Combs	Richard Darby
2026	M. John Kane IV	Dustin Rowe	Noma Gurich	Travis Jett	James R. Winchester	Dana Kuehn	James E. Edmondson	Doug Combs	Richard Darby

== Justices of the Oklahoma Territory Supreme Court ==
- Edward B. Green, Chief Justice (1890–1893)
- John G. Clark, Associate Justice (1890–1903), Chief Justice
- Abraham Jefferson Seay 1890–92
- John H. Burford 1892–1906, Chief Justice 1898–1903
- A.G.C. Bierer 1894–98
- John L. McAtee 1898–1902
- Henry W. Scott (judge) (1892–1896), Chief Justice 1895–1896
- James R. Keaton 1896–98
- John C. Tarsney 1896–99
- Frank Dale 1893–1898
- Bayard T. Hainer 1898–1907
- Clinton F. Irwin 1899–1907
- Joseph A. Gill 1899 – 1907
- J. L. Pancoast 1902–1907
- Milton C. Garber 1906–07
- James K. Beauchamp 1902–1906
- Frank E. Gillette 1902–1907
