= Wayne W. Bayless =

American attorney and politician

Chief Justice of the Oklahoma Supreme Court
- In office 1939–1941
- Preceded by: Monroe Osborn
- Succeeded by: Earl Welch

Justice of the Oklahoma Supreme Court
- In office 1933–1949
- Preceded by: W. H. Kornegay
- Succeeded by: Napoleon B. Johnson

Personal details
- Born: Wayne Winton Bayless; August 27, 1895 Cassville, Missouri
- Died: December 17, 1975 (aged 80) Claremore, Oklahoma
- Occupation: Banker; attorney; judge; politician

Wayne W. Bayless (1895-1975) (less commonly known as Wayne Winton Bayless) was an attorney and politician from Claremore, Oklahoma, who served as a justice on the Oklahoma Supreme Court between 1932 and 1948. A member of the Democratic party, he had served previously in the Oklahoma House of Representatives, a candidate for the U.S. House of Representatives in 1924 and as a District Judge in 1926–1929.

Wayne W. Bayless was born to John Melville Bayless (1851-1907) (Note: According to Harlow, John M. Bayless was a "banker and financier.") and Mary (née Stubblefield) (1856-1928) on August 27, 1895, in Cassville, Missouri. In 1907, Wayne and his family moved to Oklahoma, where they settled in Claremore. He attended the Oklahoma University School of Law, where he earned the LL.B., then was admitted to the Oklahoma Bar in 1920.

Bayless was elected as a member of the 9th Oklahoma Legislature in 1932. In 1924, he received the Democratic nomination for Representative to the U.S. Congress. Although he lost in the general election, the margin was only 143 votes out of 93,000 cast.

He was elected Judge of the 2nd Judicial District in 1926, then was re-elected to that position in 1930. He was named an associate justice of the Oklahoma Supreme Court in 1932, then retained his seat in the 1936 election. He is known for upholding racially restrictive covenant in 1944. He had announced that he would run for reelection again in 1948.

Bayless died December 17, 1975, at the age of 80. He was interred in Woodlawn Cemetery at Claremore.

== Notes ==
Political offices
Preceded by J.T. Johnson	Justice of the Oklahoma Supreme Court; 1927–1931	Succeeded by Cecil Talmage O'Neal
