= Fred P. Branson =

American judge (1881–1960)

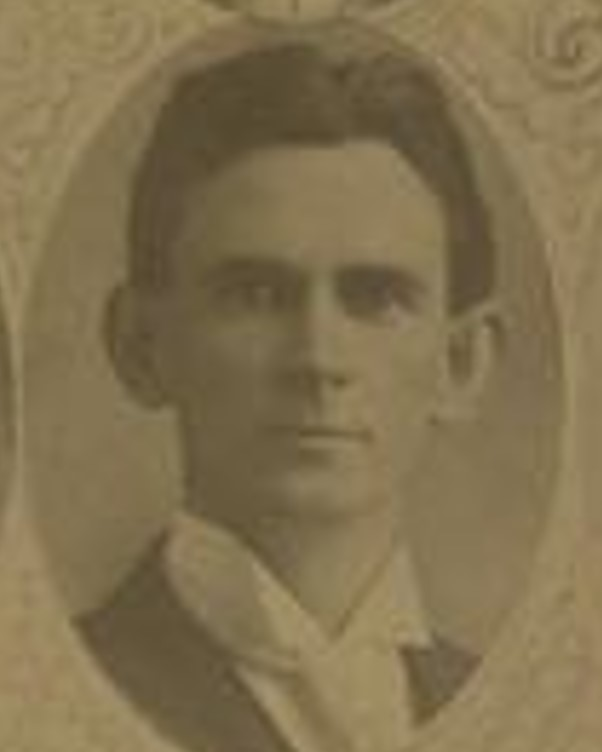
- Branson in 1907

Chief Justice of the Oklahoma Supreme Court
- In office 1927–1929
- Preceded by: George M. Nicholson
- Succeeded by: Charles W. Mason

Justice of the Oklahoma Supreme Court
- In office 1923–1929
- Preceded by: J. R. Miller
- Succeeded by: Thomas G. Andrews

Personal details
- Born: Frederick Page Branson; March 1, 1881 Rockmart, Georgia
- Died: October 5, 1960 (aged 79) Tulsa, Oklahoma
- Education: Mercer College (LLB)
- Occupation: Attorney; Justice of the Oklahoma Supreme Court (1926-29); Chief Justice Oklahoma Supreme Court (1927-29); businessman
- Known for: Ruling regarding attempted impeachment of Oklahoma Governor Henry Johnston

Frederick Page Branson (March 1, 1881 – October 5, 1960) was a justice of the Oklahoma Supreme Court from 1926 to 1929, serving as chief justice from 1927 to 1929.

Branson was born in Rockmart, Georgia, on March 1, 1881, to Levi Branson and Rhoda Page Mull. Rhoda had an older son, Joseph Mull, from her marriage to the late Harrison Mull. The Mulls had moved to Arkansas, but after her first husband died, she and Joseph moved back to the small town of Cass Station, Georgia, where she met and married Levi Branson, a widower who already had 13 children from his previous marriage. Levi and Rhoda Mull Branson had two sons besides Branson, and one daughter.

== Early life ==
It is unclear when Rhoda and her surviving children relocated from Cass Station to Rockmart, then located primarily in Polk County, Georgia, where Fred began receiving his first exposure to public education in the so-called "field schools". One condition for states who had left the Union to join the Confederate States of America to rejoin the Union was to provide "separate but equal" schools for black and white children. The State quickly responded by making elementary education the responsibility of the individual counties, but without providing any individual funding sources.

== Education ==
In 1889, the Piedmont Institution was established in Rockmart by the North Georgia Methodist Conference to provide more than an elementary education. (Note: Georgia historically defined elementary education as ending at the level of eighth grade.) Branson attended Piedmont for at least two years. In 1912, Piedmont closed. Cass County bought the building and reopened it as the first high school in the Cass County School District.

After high school, Branson enrolled at Emory University in Atlanta, then at the Mercer College School of Law of Mercer College in Macon, Georgia, where he obtained a law degree on June 11, 1903. He was admitted to the Georgia Bar on the same day, then went home on vacation.

== Career ==
=== Initial career ===
After law school, he travelled to Oklahoma Territory, stopping briefly in Oklahoma City, before going to McAlester, then in Indian Territory, where he began working for a year in a private law office. He then worked as Deputy Clerk of the United States Court for the Indian Territory.

On August 4, 1904, he married Eula Jeans, a native Tennessean who was then living in McAlester. By September 15, 1904, he and Jeans had moved to Muskogee, Oklahoma, where he had accepted a position as a law clerk for the Dawes Commission. He also worked for the commissioner of the Five Civilized Tribes. He thereafter opened his own law office in Muskogee.

=== Political and judicial career ===
Fred discovered a love for politics while a youth in Georgia. (Note: Oklahoma historian Thobaugh wrote that Branson first ran for a seat in the House of Representatives of the First Legislature of the State of Oklahoma in 1907. He won the nomination and beat the favored Republican candidate on his first attempt, then served one year term with distinction, but declined to run for re-election. It was enough to impress the local Democratic power brokers.) In 1907 he won a term in the Oklahoma House of Representatives in the First Oklahoma Legislature, but declined to run again. In the summer of 1908, he was nominated as a representative to the State Democratic Committee as representative for Muskogee County, where he served until 1912, including three years as committee chairman. He resigned both positions after the party scored impressive wins in the 1912 elections. In April 1914, he was appointed to fill the unexpired term of R. C. Allen, who had earlier resigned as the judge of the Third Judicial District. He was thereafter elected County Attorney of Muskogee County, for two terms. Then he was appointed District Judge for the Judicial District comprising Muskogee and Wagoner County. Afterward, he ran for the Oklahoma Supreme Court, and was elected for a 6-year term. He served two of the six years as Chief Justice of the Oklahoma Supreme Court.

While serving as chief justice, the Oklahoma House of Representatives voted to impeach Governor Henry Johnston on December 12, 1927. By the next morning, the House had also voted to impeach the chief justice, who had already ruled that the impeachment session had no legal standing, because the governor had not called for the special session and the Oklahoma constitution did not give the legislative body the power to call itself into session.

=== Later career ===
After leaving the Oklahoma Supreme Court, Branson moved to Texas, where he became very successful investing in oil leases that made him very wealthy. Oklahoma Governor Roy J. Turner appointed Branson president of the Grand River Dam Authority (GRDA), where he remained until 1959. After GRDA, he went back into elective politics. He made two tries to become the Democratic candidate for U. S. House of Representatives, but neither succeeded. He then announced his intention to run for governor, but withdrew after former governor Turner announced his own candidacy.

== Personal life ==
He married Eula Jeans in 1904, who preceded him in death. No children were born to them. Eula Jeans Branson died January 27, 1960, in Muscogee, Oklahoma, and was buried in the Branson Mausoleum in Myrtle Hill Cemetery in Rome, Georgia.

He was a member of:

- Saint Paul Methodist Church of Muskogee;
- Masonic Lodge No. 28 of Muskogee;
- Chapter Three of Royal Arch Masons,
- Muskogee Commandery No. 2 of the Knights Templar;
- Bedouin Temple of the Nobles of the Mystic Shrine;
- Life member of Lodge 517 of BPOE. He was a member of the Muskogee County and Oklahoma Bar Associations and a member of the Democratic party of Oklahoma. He was the first State Chairman of the Democratic party of Oklahoma.

== Death ==
Judge Branson died on October 5, 1960, in a Tulsa Hospital, after an illness that had lasted for a year. His funeral service was conducted by Dr. Wilford Jones, minister of Saint Paul Methodist Church of Muskogee, Oklahoma, and interment was in the Branson mausoleum at Myrtle Hill Cemetery, Rome, Georgia.
