= Justice Phelps =

Justice Phelps may refer to:

- James Phelps (congressman) (1822–1900), judge of the Connecticut Supreme Court of Errors and Appeals
- James I. Phelps (1875–1947), associate justice of the Oklahoma Supreme Court
- Marlin T. Phelps (1881–1964), associate justice of the Arizona Supreme Court
- Samuel S. Phelps (1793–1855), associate justice of the Vermont Supreme Court
