= Edwin R. McNeill =

American judge (1880–1962)

Edwin R. McNeill, Jr.
- Born: Edwin R. McNeill; January 5, 1880; Onawa, Iowa
- Died: 1962; Pawnee, Oklahoma
- Other name: Edwin Ruthven McNeill
- Occupations: Teacher, attorney, judge
- Known for: Justice of the Oklahoma Supreme Court (1931)

Edwin Ruthven McNeill, Jr. (January 5, 1880 – September 22, 1962) was a justice of the Oklahoma Supreme Court from 1931 to 1937, representing District 6. He also served as chief justice from 1934 to 1936.

== Early life and education ==
Edwin R. McNeill, Jr. was born January 5, 1880 to Edwin Ruthven McNeill, Sr. (1842-1907) and his wife, Louisa Irene Younkin, (1847-1925), who had married on May 5, 1868, and settled near Onawa, Monona County, Iowa. Edwin, Sr. and Louisa had eleven children. (Note: Ten of the children were boys. The eleventh was a girl, who died before her parents could give her a name. One of his brothers was Neal E. McNeill, who also became a judge in Oklahoma and served on the Supreme Court. Neal McNeil served on the Oklahoma Supreme Court from 1918 to 1924, also representing District 6.)

Edwin Jr. was employed as a teacher in Monona County's Ashton Township in 1900. He received a bachelor's degree from the University of Minnesota in 1905, then earned a degree in law from Chicago-Kent College of Law. On September 3, 1913, he married Louise Clark. Edwin and Louise had no children. The couple moved to Pawnee County, Oklahoma in 1916. When the U.S. became involved with World War I, Edwin was named chairman of the Pawnee County Draft Board. His wife was appointed chairwoman of the Military Relief Committee.

== Career in law ==
Edwin ran for, and was elected to, two terms as judge for the Pawnee and Tulsa County District, serving from 1923 to 1931. During his tenure, he helped establish the Pawnee County Law Library and set up a policy allowing visitors and out-of-town lawyers to use it without charge. In 1923 he was assigned to Redfearn v. American Central Insurance Company, an action in the Tulsa race massacre. In 1931, he was appointed as Justice of the Oklahoma Supreme Court, serving through 1937. From 1934 to 1936, he served as chief justice.

== Death ==
McNeill died in Pawnee, Oklahoma from an apparent heart attack at the age of 82.

== Notes ==
Political offices
Preceded by Albert C. Hunt	Justice of the Oklahoma Supreme Court; 1931–1937	Succeeded by
