= Matthew John Kane =

American judge (1863–1924)

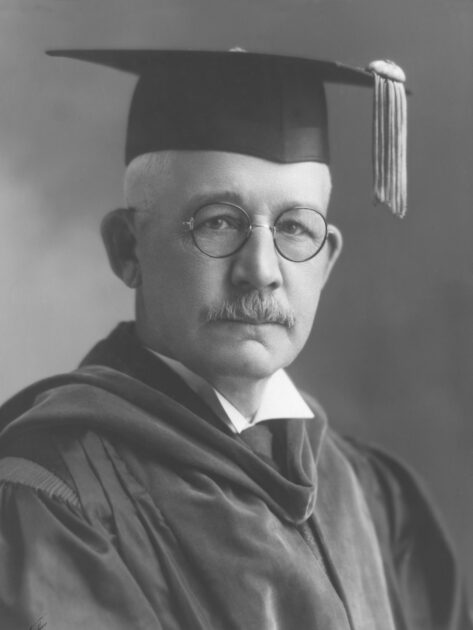

2nd and 6th Chief Justice of the Oklahoma Supreme Court
- In office 1909 – January 11, 1910
- Preceded by: Robert L. Williams
- Succeeded by: Jesse James Dunn
- In office 1915–1917
- Preceded by: Samuel W. Hayes
- Succeeded by: J. F. Sharp

Justice of the Oklahoma Supreme Court
- In office November 16, 1907 – 1923
- Preceded by: Position established
- Succeeded by: J.D. Lydick

Personal details
- Born: November 28, 1863; Niagara County, New York, US
- Died: January 2, 1924 (aged 60); Oklahoma City, US
- Relatives: M. John Kane IV (great-grandson)

Matthew John Kane (November 28, 1863 – January 2, 1924) was a justice of the Oklahoma Supreme Court from 1907 to 1923, serving as chief justice from 1909 to 1911. A native of New York state, he earned a law degree at Georgetown University. Joining the Land Run of 1889 in Indian Territory, he settled in Kingfisher, Oklahoma.

== Biography ==
=== Early life ===
Matthew John Kane was born to Anthony and Mary (Dunn) Kane of Niagara County, New York on November 28, 1863. He was the eldest of seven siblings. He graduated from Georgetown University in the class of 1886 with a law degree, (Note: Georgetown awarded Kane the Doctor of Laws degree in 1917.) Kane then went west to Wichita and to Harper, Kansas, before joining the Land Run of 1889 in Indian Territory. After the run, he settled in Kingfisher, Oklahoma, and soon became chief deputy for Patrick S. Nagle, the U.S. Marshal in Oklahoma.

=== Political career in Oklahoma ===
Kane became a delegate to the Oklahoma Constitutional Convention, shortly before the granting of statehood. He was also a delegate to the Universal Congress of Lawyers and Jurists, in St. Louis, 1904.

=== Service on the Supreme Court ===
After Oklahoma officially became a state on November 16, 1907, Kane was one of the judges elected to the first session of the Oklahoma Supreme Court. Jesse James Dunn was elected at the same time. Since both had the same seniority and would have represented the same judicial district, they agreed that Dunn should serve during the first term (1908-9) while Kane should serve during the second (1910–11). The issue was permanently resolved when Dunn resigned the seat in 1913 to move to California.

A brief summary of Justice Kane's life on the Oklahoma Supreme Court indicate that he established important precedents for the state in his arguments concerning taxation and the descent and distribution of Indian lands.

== Family ==
Kane married Miss Kathleen Reagan (1883–1968) of St. Paul County, Kansas on June 9, 1908. They had three children: Matthew John, Jr., Kathleen and Anthony Reagan Kane. Justice Kane's great-grandson Matthew John Kane IV followed in his footsteps, being appointed to the Oklahoma Supreme Court by Governor Kevin Stitt in September 2019.

== Matthew John Kane award ==
The Knights of Columbus in Oklahoma presents its Matthew John Kane public service award to individuals who have performed significant service to the Catholic Church and Oklahoma. Its namesake was the first Roman Catholic to become a justice on the Oklahoma Supreme Court. (Note: Oklahoma recipients include Gov. Mary Fallin, Frank Lucas, Don Nickles, Frank Keating, David Walters and Dan Webber, educators Burns Hargis and James Halligan, national commentator Deal Hudson and Kansas U.S. Sen. (now Gov.) Sam Brownback.)

== Electoral history ==
1907 Oklahoma Supreme Court District 3 election
Party	Candidate	Votes	%	±%
Democratic	Matthew John Kane	132,433	57.0	New
Republican	John H. Cotterall	99,655	42.9	New
Democratic gain from		Swing	N/A	

== Notes ==
Political offices
Preceded by Newly created seat	Justice, Oklahoma Supreme Court; 1909–1924	Succeeded by Charles W. Mason
