= John T. Johnson =

John T. Johnson may refer to:

- John Telemachus Johnson (1788–1856), U.S. Representative from Kentucky
- John T. Johnson (Oklahoma judge) (1856–1935), associate justice of the Oklahoma Supreme Court

== See also ==
- John Johnson (disambiguation)
