= Matthew Kane =

Matthew Kane may refer to:

- Matthew Kane, a character in the video game Quake 4
- Matthew Robert Kane (born 1991), British actor
- Matthew John Kane (1863–1924), justice of the Oklahoma Supreme Court
