= William A. Berry (judge) =

American judge (1915–2004)

Justice of the Oklahoma Supreme Court
- In office 1958-1978
- Preceded by: W. A. Carlile
- Succeeded by: Marian P. Opala

Personal details
- Born: William Aylor Berry; December 28, 1915 Ripley, Oklahoma, US
- Died: June 16, 2004 (aged 88) Oklahoma City, Oklahoma, US
- Resting place: Rose Hill Burial Park, Oklahoma City, Oklahoma, US; 35°31′53.0″N 97°32′12.8″W
- Spouse: Carolyn Berry
- Children: 2
- Parents: Thomas Nelson Berry; Harriet Virginia Berry
- Education: Missouri Military Academy
- Alma mater: Oklahoma State University; University of Oklahoma College of Law
- Known for: Exposed Oklahoma Supreme Court scandal during 1960s

Military service
- Allegiance: United States
- Branch/service: United States Navy
- Rank: Ensign
- Battles/wars: World War II: Asiatic-Pacific Theater (POW)

William A. Berry (born William Aylor Berry; December 28, 1915 – June 16, 2004) was a Justice of the Oklahoma Supreme Court from 1958 to 1978. During World War II, Berry survived 33 months as a prisoner of war in Japan. While serving on the supreme court, he revealed corruption that became a major political scandal.

== Biography ==
Berry was born in Ripley, Oklahoma, to Thomas Nelson Berry and Harriet Virginia (née Patton) Berry, as a young man, he graduated from the Missouri Military Academy in 1930, and earned degrees from Oklahoma State University and the University of Oklahoma School of Law. He was County Attorney for Payne County, but after the U. S. became involved in WWII, he joined the U. S. Naval Intelligence Service with the rank of Ensign. Stationed in Manila, he was captured by the Japanese in 1942 and incarcerated as a prisoner of war. He escaped from confinement once, but was recaptured, tried and given a sentence of death. However, the sentence was never carried out. He was liberated from Bilibid Prison by American forces during the liberation of the Philippines in 1945.

== Post-war career ==
He ended his military service with the rank of lieutenant commander and had earned the Purple Heart, the Bronze Star, two Presidential Unit Citations and two Battle Stars, including a Philippine Defense Citation. Returning to civilian life, he moved to Stillwater, Oklahoma, where he began a private law practice in 1947, and became Assistant District Attorney for the Western District of Oklahoma. He resigned that post in 1950 to run for a seat in the legislature, a race that he lost. Moving to Oklahoma City, he ran for County Judge, Division 2, a newly created opening. Assigned to handle all juvenile cases coming before the County Court, he was in a position to persuade officialdom and voters that the county needed a juvenile detention facility. The facility was approved, funded, and opened in 1959. It was subsequently named "Berry House."

== 1965 supreme court scandal ==
A scandal affecting the Oklahoma Supreme Court erupted into public view on April 8, 1964, when a Federal Grand Jury indicted Justice Earl Welch and semi-retired Justice N. S. Corn on charges of income tax evasion. (Note: Justice Corn, a former vice chief justice, had retired from the court in 1959, when he was 75 years old, and had been on semi-retired status, presiding on special assignments and drawing three-fourths of his former pay.) Welch allegedly evaded $13,364 in income taxes for 1957 through 1961, and Corn allegedly evaded $11,063 in 1957 through 1959. Corn did not contest the charge and was sentenced to 18 months in prison and was fined $11,250. The U.S. Attorney told the court that he had a witness who would testify that he gave Corn $150,000 for a favorable decision in a corporate case coming up before the Oklahoma Supreme Court, and had receipts showing the money was delivered to Corn in cash via armored car. The witness had also told the district attorney that Corn told him the money was to "...assist himself and other members of the Supreme Court in meeting campaign expenses."

Berry, a relative newcomer to the Supreme Court, was not involved in any of the scandalous behavior. He was one of the people who first learned of the scandal, was morally outraged by the details and helped bring it to public attention. Afterward, assisted by James E. Alexander, he related the affair in a book: Justice for Sale: Shocking Scandal of the Oklahoma Supreme Court. (Note: James E. Alexander was Berry's co-author of Prisoner of the Rising Sun, which related Berry's experiences as a prisoner of the Japanese during World War II.) The book documented the bribes that were the downfall of Corn and Welch, but similar behavior over a long time, and helped build pressure for changing the way Oklahoma selects and monitors the behavior of its judges.

== Post-retirement ==
After retiring from the Supreme Court, Berry practiced as a private attorney and as a director, president and chairman of the board of the Thomas N. Berry Company, his family's oil and gas business, which was headquartered in Stillwater.

== Death ==
Berry died on June 16, 2004, in Oklahoma City. A funeral service for the judge was held on June 18 at the Church of Jesus Christ of Latter Day Saints of Oklahoma City. His widow, Carolyn (1925-2013), died on October 18, 2013. The Berrys were survived by two children, five grandchildren, and three great-grandchildren.

== Legacy ==
Berry has been credited with starting the Oklahoma County Juvenile Detention home in June 1953, when he was the Oklahoma County Juvenile Judge. He brought together a number of disparate supporters who shared an interest in creating such a facility. These included: the Juvenile Council of Oklahoma City, county officials, United Church Women, PTA groups, as well as professional groups of social workers, psychologists, and members of the bar and medical professions. Prodded by these efforts, a bill was passed in the Oklahoma Legislature to allow Oklahoma County to fund construction of a home for delinquent young people, under 18 years old. Construction began in March, 1958, and the first child was admitted December 20, 1958. (Note: The original facility had 21 beds. It was replaced in September, 1986 by a 42-bed facility. In 1996, another 38 beds, three classrooms, staff offices and a multipurpose room were added.) On February 8, 1960, the Oklahoma County Commissioners Court officially named the facility "Berry House," in honor of Judge Berry.

== See also ==
- List of justices of the Oklahoma Supreme Court
