= James H. Gordon =

American lawyer and judge (1868–1936)

Justice of the Oklahoma Supreme Court
- In office 1924–1924
- Preceded by: C. B. Cochrane
- Succeeded by: Eugene Lester

Personal details
- Born: October 3, 1868; Locust Dale, Virginia, U.S.
- Died: October 23, 1936 (aged 68); McAlester, Oklahoma, U.S.

James Herndon Gordon (October 3, 1868 – October 23, 1936) was an American judge who was the Justice of the Oklahoma Supreme Court in 1924.

== Early life and education ==
James H. Gordon was born on October 3, 1868, in Locust Dale, Virginia, to Andrew James Gordon and Lucy Herndon Willis Gordon. He was educated at the Suffolk Military Academy and attended the University of Virginia, where he received a degree of Bachelor of Law in 1890.

== Career ==
In 1890, he moved to Indian Territory and formed the law firm Stuart, Lewis and Gordon. In 1895, He was appointed Master In Chancery of the United States Court. He was appointed Justice of the Oklahoma Supreme Court to fill in a vacancy in 1924. He died on October 23, 1936, in McAlester, Oklahoma.
