= James B. Cullison =

American judge (1857–1936)

Justice of the Oklahoma Supreme Court
- In office 1929–1935
- Preceded by: James I. Phelps
- Succeeded by: James I. Phelps

Personal details
- Born: James Buchanan Cullison; September 21, 1857 New London, Henry County, Iowa
- Died: 1936 (aged 78–79)
- Relatives: William Otjen (son-in-law)

James Buchanan Cullison (September 21, 1857 – September 11, 1936) was a justice of the Oklahoma Supreme Court from 1929 to 1931.

== Early life ==
Born in New London, Henry County, Iowa on September 21, 1857, Cullison was the son of Elisha and Matilda (McCabe) Cullison. At the start of the Civil War, Elisha moved his family to a farm near Kirkville, where he died in 1865. Matilda Cullison died in 1870, leaving James B. as an orphan. He finished his primary education in Kirksville.

== Life after Kirkville ==
The Enid Daily Eagle article indicated that Cullison was elected superintendent of schools in Ononoway, (sic) Iowa soon after finishing school in Kirksville, but that he had to give up school teaching in 1884 because of unspecified health problems, and moved to Cullison, Kansas in the same year. In 1885, he moved to Hugoton, Kansas. (Note: He had been admitted to the bar, "... after years of intermittent study") He began practicing law in Hugoton, was appointed justice; then became the first deputy superintendent of public instruction, and served two years as clerk of the district court. Cullison moved to what would become Kingfisher, Oklahoma. (Note: In 1892, Kingfisher was part of Oklahoma Territory)

== Another version ==
A different source presents a different account of Cullison's life between leaving Kirksville and arriving in what would become Oklahoma. He attended Valparaiso (Indiana) Normal School, 1881–1882, and Kirksville (Missouri) State Normal School, 1882. He taught in public schools from 1875 to 1882, and was admitted to the Kansas state bar in 1888. He was the Register in the United States Land Office in Enid, Oklahoma from 1897 to 1902.

== Life in Oklahoma ==
He was Probate Judge and County Judge in Garfield County, Oklahoma, 1904–1911. District judge, 21st Oklahoma District, 1911–1929. Elected Associate Justice of the Supreme Court of Oklahoma, January 14, 1929, for term ending January 1935.

Cullison moved to Garfield County, Oklahoma as soon as it was opened to settlement by non-Indians, and settled a farm about 6 miles (9.7 km) east of Enid, where he lived until President William McKinley appointed him as register of the U.S. Land Office in Enid in November 1897.

After statehood went into effect, James B. Cullison was named the first County Judge of Garfield County. He was elected District Judge in 1911.

== Personal ==
James B. Cullison married May Mary Sharp on July 30, 1882. Their marriage was in Wayne, Iowa.

His daughter, June B. Cullison, married William Otjen.

The United States Census for 1900, 1910, 1920, 1930 show him as head of household in Enid, Garfield County, Oklahoma during this period. James died in 1936 in Enid, Oklahoma. His wife died in 1948, according to tombstone inscriptions.
