= 1942 Oklahoma gubernatorial election =

- November 3, 1942
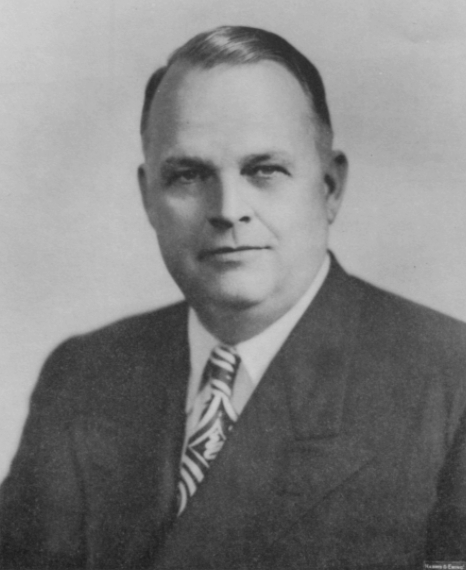

Nominee	Robert S. Kerr	William Otjen
Party	Democratic	Republican
Popular vote	196,565	180,454
Percentage	51.89%	47.64%
- County results Kerr: 50–60% 60–70% 70–80% 80–90% Otjen: 50–60% 60–70% 70–80%
Governor before election
Leon C. Phillips
Democratic
Elected Governor
Robert S. Kerr
Democratic

The 1942 Oklahoma gubernatorial election was held on November 3, 1942, and was a race for Governor of Oklahoma. Democratic nominee Robert S. Kerr defeated Republican nominee William Otjen. Edward W. Fickinger was also on the ballot representing the Prohibition Party. Gomer Griffith Smith and Robert Burns unsuccessfully sought the Democratic nomination.

== Primary election ==
=== Democratic party ===
Businessman Robert S. Kerr narrowly defeated Gomer Smith and Frank P. Douglass in a three-way race for the Democratic nomination.

==== Candidates ====
- Robert Burns, former Lieutenant Governor of Oklahoma (1931-1935)
- Frank P. Douglass, district judge in Oklahoma County
- Herbert Hodge
- James H. Johnson
- Robert S. Kerr, businessman and founder of Kerr-McGee
- S. D. Lynch
- Gomer Smith, former representative from Oklahoma's 5th congressional district

==== Results ====
Democratic primary results
Party	Candidate	Votes	%
Democratic	Robert S. Kerr	147,169	37.32%
Democratic	Gomer Smith	136,842	34.70%
Democratic	Frank P. Douglass	99,221	25.16%
Democratic	Robert Burns	5,399	1.37%
Democratic	James H. Johnson	3,235	0.82%
Democratic	Herbert Hodge	1,414	0.36%
Democratic	S. D. Lynch	1,112	0.28%
Total votes		394,392	100.00%

=== Republican party ===
==== Candidates ====
- Ernest G. Albright
- W. N. Dannenburg
- William Otjen, former member of Oklahoma Senate

==== Results ====
Republican primary results
Party	Candidate	Votes	%
Republican	William Otjen	17,067	47.51%
Republican	Ernest G. Albright	9,661	26.90%
Republican	W. N. Dannenburg	9,193	25.59%
Total votes		35,921	100.00%

=== Prohibition party ===
Edward W. Fickinger was nominated without opposition.

== General election ==
=== Results ===
1942 Oklahoma gubernatorial election
Party	Candidate	Votes	%	±%
Democratic	Robert S. Kerr	196,565	51.89%	−18.14%
Republican	William Otjen	180,454	47.64%	+18.33%
Prohibition	Edward W. Fickinger	1,762	0.47%	−0.04%
Total votes		378,781	100.00%	
Majority		16,111	4.25%	
Democratic hold		Swing	-36.47%	

=== Results by county ===
Wagoner County voted Republican for the first time since 1907.

County	Robert S. Kerr Democratic		William Otjen Republican		Edward W. Fickinger Prohibition		Margin		Total votes cast
County	#	%	#	%	#	%	#	%	Total votes cast
Adair	2,368	51.67%	2,205	48.11%	10	0.22%	163	3.56%	4,583
Alfalfa	1,454	37.27%	2,414	61.88%	33	0.85%	-960	-24.61%	3,901
Atoka	1,499	68.86%	669	30.73%	9	0.41%	830	38.13%	2,177
Beaver	1,385	53.91%	1,160	45.15%	24	0.93%	225	8.76%	2,569
Beckham	1,279	61.88%	773	37.40%	15	0.73%	506	24.48%	2,067
Blaine	1,112	31.21%	2,426	68.09%	25	0.70%	-1,314	-36.88%	3,563
Bryan	3,194	80.43%	767	19.32%	10	0.25%	2,427	61.12%	3,971
Caddo	3,444	52.11%	3,136	47.45%	29	0.44%	308	4.66%	6,609
Canadian	2,201	41.41%	3,075	57.86%	39	0.73%	-874	-16.44%	5,315
Carter	3,627	75.77%	1,147	23.96%	13	0.27%	2,480	51.81%	4,787
Cherokee	2,740	55.01%	2,225	44.67%	16	0.32%	515	10.34%	4,981
Choctaw	2,138	77.07%	624	22.49%	12	0.43%	1,514	54.58%	2,774
Cimarron	632	56.08%	485	43.03%	10	0.89%	147	13.04%	1,127
Cleveland	2,351	60.73%	1,499	38.72%	21	0.54%	852	22.01%	3,871
Coal	969	76.42%	295	23.26%	4	0.32%	674	53.15%	1,268
Comanche	2,911	67.60%	1,379	32.03%	16	0.37%	1,532	35.58%	4,306
Cotton	1,302	66.36%	649	33.08%	11	0.56%	653	33.28%	1,962
Craig	2,528	54.72%	2,076	44.94%	16	0.35%	452	9.78%	4,620
Creek	4,532	44.82%	5,538	54.77%	42	0.42%	-1,006	-9.95%	10,112
Custer	1,609	53.10%	1,407	46.44%	14	0.46%	202	6.67%	3,030
Delaware	2,107	52.17%	1,909	47.26%	23	0.57%	198	4.90%	4,039
Dewey	1,491	48.89%	1,534	50.30%	25	0.82%	-43	-1.41%	3,050
Ellis	703	42.92%	916	55.92%	19	1.16%	-213	-13.00%	1,638
Garfield	3,736	30.83%	8,308	68.55%	75	0.62%	-4,572	-37.73%	12,119
Garvin	2,602	69.41%	1,137	30.33%	10	0.27%	1,465	39.08%	3,749
Grady	2,730	58.22%	1,946	41.50%	13	0.28%	784	16.72%	4,689
Grant	1,456	38.17%	2,321	60.84%	38	1.00%	-865	-22.67%	3,815
Greer	1,010	72.40%	377	27.03%	8	0.57%	633	45.38%	1,395
Harmon	623	75.79%	199	24.21%	0	0.00%	424	51.58%	822
Harper	874	47.27%	964	52.14%	11	0.59%	-90	-4.87%	1,849
Haskell	2,231	62.34%	1,345	37.58%	3	0.08%	886	24.76%	3,579
Hughes	2,764	63.89%	1,556	35.97%	6	0.14%	1,208	27.92%	4,326
Jackson	1,324	74.26%	452	25.35%	7	0.39%	872	48.91%	1,783
Jefferson	1,534	71.95%	580	27.20%	18	0.84%	954	44.75%	2,132
Johnston	1,110	71.02%	443	28.34%	10	0.64%	667	42.67%	1,563
Kay	4,210	40.59%	6,060	58.43%	101	0.97%	-1,850	-17.84%	10,371
Kingfisher	1,440	36.24%	2,509	63.14%	25	0.63%	-1,069	-26.90%	3,974
Kiowa	1,383	62.02%	831	37.26%	16	0.72%	552	24.75%	2,230
Latimer	1,625	70.26%	670	28.97%	18	0.78%	955	41.29%	2,313
Le Flore	3,345	68.87%	1,499	30.86%	13	0.27%	1,846	38.01%	4,857
Lincoln	3,048	40.85%	4,377	58.67%	36	0.48%	-1,329	-17.81%	7,461
Logan	2,261	41.21%	3,190	58.15%	35	0.64%	-929	-16.93%	5,486
Love	861	83.27%	168	16.25%	5	0.48%	693	67.02%	1,034
Major	607	22.29%	2,096	76.97%	20	0.73%	-1,489	-54.68%	2,723
Marshall	992	75.49%	315	23.97%	7	0.53%	677	51.52%	1,314
Mayes	2,052	51.83%	1,895	47.87%	12	0.30%	157	3.97%	3,959
McClain	1,353	65.81%	697	33.90%	6	0.29%	656	31.91%	2,056
McCurtain	2,548	84.96%	439	14.64%	12	0.40%	2,109	70.32%	2,999
McIntosh	1,633	53.63%	1,406	46.17%	6	0.20%	227	7.45%	3,045
Murray	1,425	75.64%	452	23.99%	7	0.37%	973	51.65%	1,884
Muskogee	5,137	57.22%	3,825	42.61%	15	0.17%	1,312	14.62%	8,977
Noble	1,381	38.12%	2,227	61.47%	15	0.41%	-846	-23.35%	3,623
Nowata	1,691	44.01%	2,117	55.10%	34	0.88%	-426	-11.09%	3,842
Okfuskee	1,939	60.88%	1,235	38.78%	11	0.35%	704	22.10%	3,185
Oklahoma	19,085	54.81%	15,605	44.81%	133	0.38%	3,480	9.99%	34,823
Okmulgee	4,862	54.20%	4,081	45.50%	27	0.30%	781	8.71%	8,970
Osage	2,971	45.70%	3,482	53.56%	48	0.74%	-511	-7.86%	6,501
Ottawa	3,098	50.76%	2,983	48.88%	22	0.36%	115	1.88%	6,103
Pawnee	1,900	39.87%	2,843	59.65%	23	0.48%	-943	-19.79%	4,766
Payne	3,470	46.75%	3,919	52.80%	34	0.46%	-449	-6.05%	7,423
Pittsburg	3,123	73.81%	1,097	25.93%	11	0.26%	2,026	47.88%	4,231
Pontotoc	3,530	73.08%	1,282	26.54%	18	0.37%	2,248	46.54%	4,830
Pottawatomie	4,311	55.12%	3,478	44.47%	32	0.41%	833	10.65%	7,821
Pushmataha	1,344	76.58%	404	23.02%	7	0.40%	940	53.56%	1,755
Roger Mills	1,258	64.98%	660	34.09%	18	0.93%	598	30.89%	1,936
Rogers	1,870	47.55%	2,046	52.02%	17	0.43%	-176	-4.47%	3,933
Seminole	3,782	59.88%	2,512	39.77%	22	0.35%	1,270	20.11%	6,316
Sequoyah	2,963	63.56%	1,691	36.27%	8	0.17%	1,272	27.28%	4,662
Stephens	3,073	63.57%	1,723	35.64%	38	0.79%	1,350	27.93%	4,834
Texas	1,523	63.86%	852	35.72%	10	0.42%	671	28.13%	2,385
Tillman	1,329	73.87%	462	25.68%	8	0.44%	867	48.19%	1,799
Tulsa	14,767	37.09%	24,982	62.75%	63	0.16%	-10,215	-25.66%	39,812
Wagoner	2,114	41.06%	2,944	57.18%	91	1.77%	-830	-16.12%	5,149
Washington	3,249	42.70%	4,327	56.87%	33	0.43%	-1,078	-14.17%	7,609
Washita	1,218	54.47%	1,009	45.13%	9	0.40%	209	9.35%	2,236
Woods	1,764	44.11%	2,198	54.96%	37	0.93%	-434	-10.85%	3,999
Woodward	1,460	42.77%	1,930	56.53%	24	0.70%	-470	-13.77%	3,414
Totals	196,565	51.89%	180,454	47.64%	1,762	0.47%	16,111	4.25%	378,781

==== Counties that flipped from Republican to Democratic ====
- Beaver
- Texas

==== Counties that flipped from Democratic to Republican ====
- Blaine
- Canadian
- Creek
- Dewey
- Ellis
- Garfield
- Grant
- Harper
- Kay
- Kingfisher
- Lincoln
- Logan
- Noble
- Nowata
- Osage
- Pawnee
- Payne
- Rogers
- Tulsa
- Wagoner
- Washington
- Woods
- Woodward
