= John B. Turner =

American attorney and judge

4th Chief Justice of the Oklahoma Supreme Court
- In office 1911–1913
- Preceded by: Jesse James Dunn
- Succeeded by: Samuel W. Hayes

Justice of the Oklahoma Supreme Court
- In office November 16, 1907 – 1918
- Preceded by: Position established
- Succeeded by: John H. Pitchford

Personal details
- Born: August 13, 1860; Robertson County, Tennessee
- Died: 1937; Adams, Tennessee

John B. Turner (1860–1937) was an American attorney and one of the first justices appointed to the Oklahoma Supreme Court after statehood was granted in 1907. He was named as Chief Justice and represented the First District (headquartered in Vinita, Oklahoma). Turner, a resident of Vinita, was to serve on the court until 1913. His annual salary was set at $4,000. He did not stand for re-election in 1914.

== Early life ==
Justice Turner was born in Robertson County, Tennessee on August 13, 1860. Educated at the Tennessee State University in Knoxville, Tennessee, he was admitted to the bar in Linn County, Missouri June 19, 1883. In 1889, Turner moved to Fort Smith, Arkansas, where he lived for the next six years. In 1894, he moved to Vinita (then in Indian Territory).

== Career ==
Little has been published about Turner's decisions or activities while serving on the court. However, one news article noted that he had written a court opinion establishing that lands allotted by the government to former slaves (freedmen) in the Chickasaw nation were exempt from taxation. (Note: The land had been purchased specifically to compensate the former slaves under the Atoka Agreement of 1902.) However, another case brought by freedmen of Garvin County to enjoin the collection of taxes on their allotments resulted in a claim that the government never actually allotted the land and, moreover, did not intend to compensate freedmen in the same way as their former owners. The Garvin judge awarded a demurrer based on this claim. By then (1914), Justice W. R. Bleakmore agreed with the Garvin judge and reversed Turner's earlier ruling.

== Retirement and death ==
Justice Turner and his wife, Flora Belle, retired to Adams, Tennessee in 1930. (Note: See note and citation on Talk page.)

== Electoral history ==
1907 Oklahoma Supreme Court District 1 election
Party	Candidate	Votes	%	±%
Democratic	John B. Turner	132,821	57.2	New
Republican	Ralph E. Campbell	99,302	42.7	New
Democratic gain from		Swing	N/A	
