= Fletcher Riley =

American judge (1893–1966)

Justice of the Oklahoma Court of Civil Appeals

Personal details
- Born: January 29, 1893 Greenville, Texas
- Died: December 1966 Bethany, Oklahoma
- Party: Democratic
- Spouse: Caroline (née Duffy)
- Education: Oklahoma University
- Occupation: attorney, judge
- Profession: Law

Fletcher S. Riley (January 29, 1893 – December 1966) was a justice of the Oklahoma Supreme Court for 24 years, from 1924 to 1948. He died in December 1966 in Bethany, Oklahoma.

== Early life and education ==
Born January 29, 1893, in Greenville, Texas, Riley moved with his family to Oklahoma in 1898 and lived in Davis, Oklahoma until 1901, when he moved to Lawton, graduating from high school there. He received a bachelor's degree from the University of Oklahoma College of Law in 1916. He continued for one more year, but left to join the U.S. Army in World War I.

== Military service ==
During World War I, Fletcher belonged to the 10th Field Artillery, 3rd Division of the American Expeditionary Force, which fought in France. His highest rank was First Lieutenant. After discharge, he returned to Lawton and joined the Lowery Post of the American Legion.

== Judicial career ==
Riley was first elected to the Oklahoma Supreme Court in 1924, and was successively re-elected in 1930, 1936, and 1942. In 1933, Riley made a speech in favor of President Roosevelt's National Recovery Act, stating that Oklahoma "stood alone in this field, i .e ., the conservation of natural resources, and served as a laboratory to try social and economic experiments without risk to the nation", which were then copied by other states and the federal government. In 1935 Justice Riley invalidated a regulation passed by Oklahoma City that prohibited whites and African Americans from living on the same streets.

One source has claimed that Riley was a successful candidate of the Ku Klux Klan, and in a 1947 case supported segregation as "... a member of the court that denied Ada Lois admission to the University of Oklahoma School of Law". Riley attempted to run for reelection in 1948, while simultaneously running for a seat in the United States Senate, but the state Democratic Party would not allow this dual candidacy, and instead nominated Hobart, Oklahoma lawyer J.H. Hughes to the court seat. Riley lost his Senate bid, and the Democrats lost his seat on the court to Republican Cecil Talmage O'Neal.

=== Role in Curtailing Oral Argument in Appellate Court ===
In 1998, two professors at the University of Oklahoma College of Law, Joseph T. Thai and Andrew M. Coats, published their research into the decline of oral argument in state appellate courts, compared to its use in earlier times. They found that the move towards total reliance on written documents might be producing adverse effects on the quality of decisions and on public confidence in the outcomes.

Thai and Coats write that by the end of the 1920s, the Oklahoma Supreme Court faced a near-overwhelming backlog of untried cases. They quote former Chief Justice Fletcher Riley as blaming this on the increasing number of property claims arising out of the discovery of oil. (Note: Over ten thousand new cases had been filed with the Supreme Court in the decade leading up to 1933.) They describe him as being the instigator of a move by the court to save time during each trial by restricting or even eliminating oral argument among the judges. Until 1933, a Supreme Court rule established oral argument as a matter of right.

Fletcher disagreed with the sanctity and value of oral argument in the judicial arena, and wrote a number of legal books and papers that are cited by Thai and Coats. He believed that the positive arguments for oral argument were a waste of time and contributed almost nothing to the outcome. Instead the judges should read written briefs by the opposing attorneys, then vote their opinions straightaway, thus saving the hour that was customarily reserved for oral argument. Riley was evidently persuasive, because in 1933, the court changed its own rule to state that, “...[n]o oral argument will be granted as a matter of right." In 1977, the rule for was strengthened and made the exceptions granting of exceptions even more difficult. (Note: On August 9, 1934, the Plattemouth Semi-Weekly Journal, a Nebraska newspaper, ran an article stating that Chief Justice Fletcher Riley had hired "...several hundred prominent attorneys" to act as temporary justices "...preparing temporary injunctions for review and approval or rejection at the court.")

Thai and Coats are proud supporters of the belief that oral argument increases openness of the judicial process. They cite noted jurists from John Marshall to the late Justice Rehnquist to support their arguments.Their article seems not to blame Justice Riley (many nearby states adopted very similar restrictive practices in order to control their own backlogs), but does cast an implied criticism at more recent Oklahoma Chief Justices for failing to relax these restrictions once the immediate crisis had abated (as several of those same states have done). They even note that the U.S. Supreme Court has continued its old policy of allowing open debate in almost every case it hears.

== Death ==
The Social Security Death Index (SSDI) lists Fletcher Riley as having died in Bethany, Oklahoma in December, 1966.

== Notes ==
Political offices
Preceded by J.T. Johnson	Justice of the Oklahoma Supreme Court; 1927–1931	Succeeded by Cecil Talmage O'Neal
