= Jesse James Dunn =

American jurist (1867–1926)

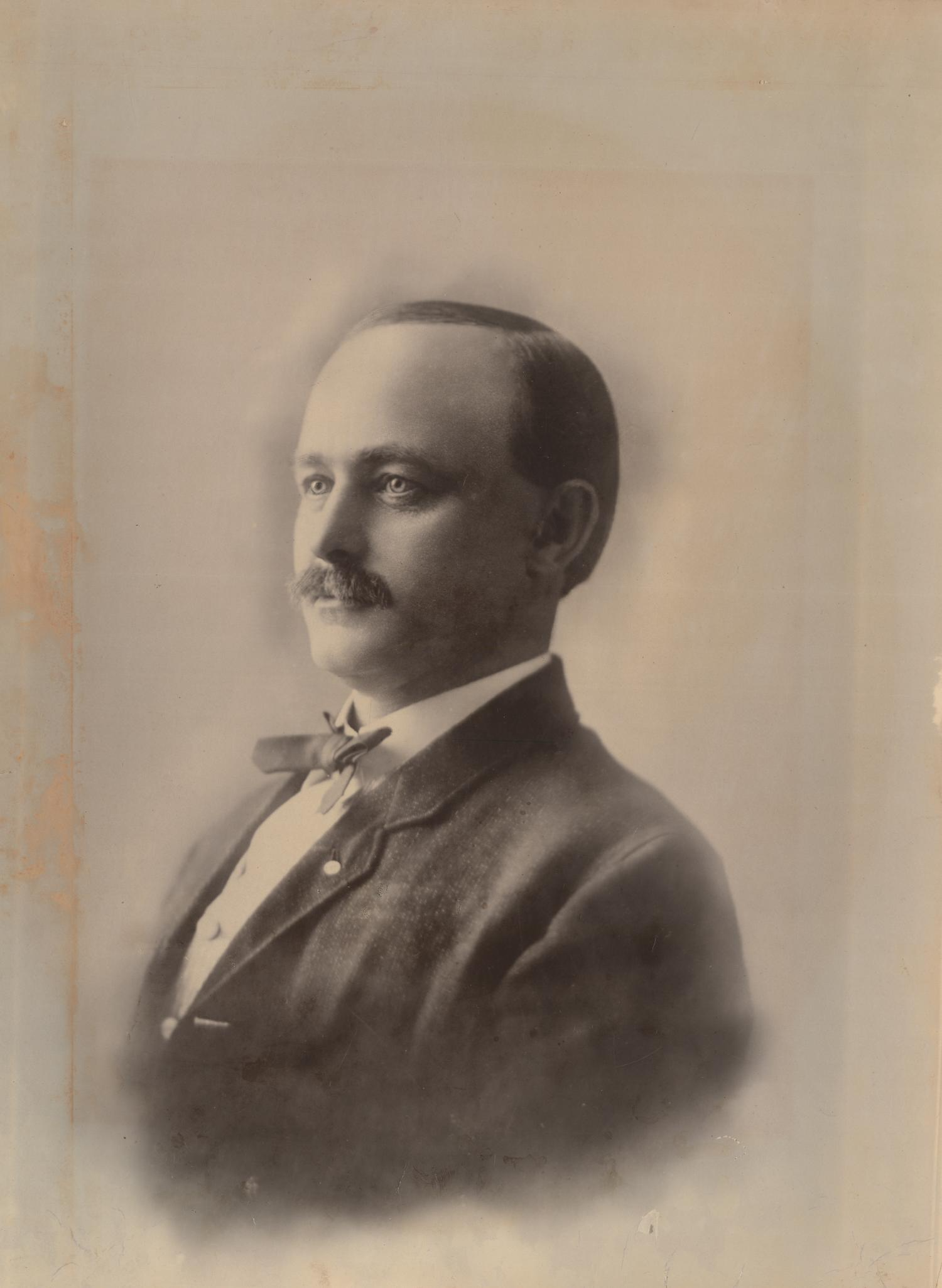

3rd Chief Justice of the Oklahoma Supreme Court
- In office January 11, 1910 – January 1911
- Preceded by: Matthew John Kane
- Succeeded by: John B. Turner

Justice of the Oklahoma Supreme Court
- In office November 16, 1907 – September 1, 1913
- Preceded by: Position established
- Succeeded by: Robert H. Loofbourrow

Personal details
- Born: October 2, 1867 Channahon, Illinois, United States
- Died: July 28, 1926 (aged 58) Oakland, California, United States
- Relatives: Catherine Heller Keating (great-niece)

Jesse James Dunn (1867-1926) was a judge on the Oklahoma Supreme Court.

== Early life and education ==
Dunn was born on October 2, 1867, at Channahon, Will County, Illinois to James McCann and Alta Fiorina (née Lewis) Dunn. In 1857, James McCann Dunn worked for a contractor delivering freight to the new Fort Leavenworth, Kansas, but in 1858, he returned to his parents' home and went into some unspecified business, until he enlisted in the Union Army, then was assigned to Company A, 97th Regiment Illinois Infantry, later transferred to Company D, 37th Regiment Illinois Infantry, and on detached service in the ambulance corps after October 16, 1864. He was honorably discharged August 15, 1865, at New Orleans, Louisiana.

When J. J. was only three years old, his parents took him to Noxubee County, Mississippi, where the three of them lived with J. M.'s parents for six years. (Note: The source document spelled the county name as "Noxuby", but some other sources indicate the official spelling is "Noxubee.") Then they moved to El Paso in Woodford County, Illinois, where they lived until 1885. They moved on to Garden City in Finney County, Kansas, where J. J. went to work in a store owned by his father, as well as working as a farmhand. (Note: Thoburn's History of Oklahoma asserted that Dunn also attended Illinois State Normal School (renamed as Illinois State University at Normal in 1965) and the Garden City (Kansas) Business College before enrolling in the University of Kansas. Thorburn did not give any details about Dunn's fields of studies, dates of attendance or whether he graduated at either of these schools.)

He had begun reading law in 1889 in the Garden City, Kansas office of George Lynn Miller. In 1892, Jesse enrolled in the University of Kansas Law School, and graduated with a Bachelor of Laws Degree on June 7, 1893.

== Life in Oklahoma ==
Jesse James Dunn and his father James McCann Dunn came to Oklahoma Territory in time to participate in the 1893 Land Run, leaving the rest of the family at home in Garden City, Kansas.

On September 16, 1893, Jesse made the run and was successful in finding a site in the new community of Alva, Oklahoma Territory where he settled down and opened a law partnership with George Lynn Miller, who later married Jesse's eldest sister.

In 1894, Jesse Dunn became a candidate for the Populist Party to become the County Judge of Woods County in Oklahoma Territory. He came within three votes of winning the nomination. He gained sufficient public exposure to win both the party nomination and the general election in 1896. (Note: Thereafter, the biography by Williams refers to him as Judge Dunn, apparently to distinguish him from his father.) He was reelected in 1898. Dunn resigned the position in 1901, after completing his second term. (Note: Thoburn wrote that Dunn was the Woods County Attorney from 1896 to 1900.) He returned to practice law in Alva, where he now formed a partnership with Francis Marion Cowgill. Meanwhile, the Populist Party continued to decline, so Dunn affiliated with the Democratic Party under William Jennings Bryan's leadership.

Dunn was elected President of the Oklahoma Territory Bar Association in 1903, (serving through 1903-4). He was also unanimously elected chairman of the Oklahoma Territory Democratic Committee. In this new position, he managed the party's strategy to win the next election for the Territory's single representative to the U. S. Congress. Although the Democrats did not win that election, it did not cost Dunn any credibility with party officials. He was made the manager for the campaign to elect delegates to the 1906 Oklahoma Constitutional Convention. The resulting delegation was composed of 99 Democrats,1 Independent and 12 Republicans. His skill and ability as a leader and organizer were confirmed.

Williams credits Judge Dunn with unifying the remaining Populists with the regular Democrats in and after the 1906 election. In 1909, the newly constituted Oklahoma Supreme Court adopted a rotation plan for choosing a chief justice. It was agreed that Justice Matthew John Kane and Judge Dunn were equally eligible, so the court decided that Kane should serve the first year of the 1909-11 term, and Dunn should serve the second. On the second Monday of January 1911, John B. Turner was elected as Chief Justice, replacing Dunn.

== Move to California ==
Dunn resigned his seat, effective September 1, 1913 and announced that he planned to move to Oakland, California, where he and Judge John Yule, an uncle of Mrs. Dunn, had formed a partnership to practice law. Their firm was known as Dunn, White and Aiken from March 1, 1914 until it was dissolved by the surviving partners on December 31, 1938. (Note: Although Dunn had died on July 28, 1926, the partners decided that his name was so valued in the profession that they wished to keep it in their firm after his demise. The body of Williams' article incorrectly gave the death date as July 27, but the author corrected his own mistake in his note 10, saying that the Associated Press and the Dunn Family had confirmed that July 28 is correct.)

== Death ==
Dunn died at Livermore Sanitarium in Oakland on July 28, 1926. Biographer Robert Williams did not identify the cause of death. He did report that the judge was survived by his widow, Saidee (née Matson), and three children: Claud, who was married but had no children, Constance (Mrs. J. M. Rutherford), who had two young sons, and Dorothea (Mrs. D. G. White), who had no children.

== Legacy ==
In 1935, The Administration Building of the Northwestern State Teachers' College at Alva, Oklahoma burned down. After it was replaced, the new building was named by the Oklahoma Legislature as "Jesse Dunn Hall." His great-niece, Catherine Heller Keating, served as the First Lady of Oklahoma during her husband Frank Keating's tenure as Governor of Oklahoma.

== Electoral history ==
1907 Oklahoma Supreme Court District 5 election
Party	Candidate	Votes	%	±%
Democratic	Jesse James Dunn	130,050	56.5	New
Republican	D.A. Crafton	99,869	43.4	New
Democratic gain from		Swing	N/A	
