= William Otjen =

American politician (1879–1973)

Member of the Oklahoma Senate from the 8th district
- In office November 1924 – November 1932
- Preceded by: Harry O. Glasser
- Succeeded by: George A. Hutchinson

Member of the Oklahoma House of Representatives from the Garfield County district
- In office November 1922 – November 1924
- Preceded by: L. G. Gossett
- Succeeded by: William J. Ryan

Personal details
- Born: October 19, 1879 Labette County, Kansas, U.S.
- Died: May 22, 1973 (aged 93) Enid, Oklahoma, U.S.
- Party: Republican
- Relatives: James B. Cullison (father-in-law)
- Education: Tri-State Business College; Valparaiso University; Northwestern University

William J. Otjen was an American politician who served in the Oklahoma Senate representing the 8th district from 1924 to 1932 and in the Oklahoma House of Representatives representing Garfield County from 1922 to 1924.

== Early life, family, and education ==
William J. Otjen was born on October 19, 1879, in Labette County, Kansas, to John Christian Otjen and Sophia Nuhfer. He served in the Spanish-American War and fought in the Philippines campaign. He attended Tri-State Business College, Valparaiso University, and Northwestern University, and was admitted to the Oklahoma Bar Association in 1905. On June 15, 1907, he married June B. Cullison, the daughter of James B. Cullison, and the couple had four children. He was the city attorney for Enid, Oklahoma, from 1912 to 1914 and worked for the Oklahoma Attorney General's office in 1915.

== Oklahoma Legislature ==
Otjen served in the Oklahoma House of Representatives as a member of the Republican Party representing Garfield County from 1922 to 1924. He was preceded in office by L. G. Gossett and succeeded in office by William J. Ryan. He later served in the Oklahoma Senate representing the 8th district from 1924 to 1932. He was preceded in office by Harry O. Glasser and succeeded in office by George A. Hutchinson. He was the Republican nominee in the 1942 Oklahoma gubernatorial election and the 1944 United States Senate election in Oklahoma. He died on May 22, 1973, in Enid, Oklahoma.
