= Frank M. Bailey =

American attorney and judge from Oklahoma

Justice of the Oklahoma Supreme Court
- In office October 1, 1919 – 1921
- Preceded by: J. F. Sharp
- Succeeded by: George M. Nicholson

Judge for the 15th judicial district of Oklahoma
- In office 1907–1915

Personal details
- Born: September 27, 1876 Missouri
- Died: November 9, 1958 (aged 82) Chickasha, Oklahoma
- Party: Democratic Party

Frank M. Bailey was an American attorney and judge from the U.S. state of Oklahoma who served on the Oklahoma Supreme Court between 1919 and 1921.

== Biography ==
Frank M. Bailey was born on September 27, 1876, in Mississippi. At 27, he moved to Chickasha, Oklahoma and began practicing law. He served as the judge for the 15th judicial district between 1907 and 1915 and as a justice of the Oklahoma Supreme Court between 1919 and 1921. A member of the Democratic Party, he lost his re-election campaign in 1921 to the Republican nominee, George M. Nicholson. He was twice president of the Oklahoma Bar Association in 1917 and 1937. He died on November 9, 1958. He was inducted into the Oklahoma Hall of Fame in 1932.
