= J. F. Sharp =

American lawyer

Justice of the Oklahoma Supreme Court
- In office January 11, 1915 – 1919
- Preceded by: Charles M. Thacker
- Succeeded by: Frank M. Bailey

Oklahoma Supreme Court Commissioner
- In office September 11, 1911 – January 11, 1915
- Appointed by: Oklahoma Supreme Court

Personal details
- Born: James Fletcher Sharp; March 2, 1865; Adams County, Illinois, U.S.
- Died: March 9, 1927; Rochester, Minnesota, U.S.

James Fletcher Sharp (1865-1927) was a Justice of the Supreme Court of Oklahoma. He was born on a farm on March 2, 1865, in Adams County, Illinois to James and Permelia Jane (née Bates) Sharp. He was the first of four boys in the family and one of two who survived to adulthood. (Note: James Baxter was the other survivor, while Marvin Bates died at the age of nine and William died in infancy.) Although he grew up on a farm, he got his primary education in public schools. Then he spent four years at Craddock College in Quincy, Illinois. He then enrolled in Missouri State University where he earned an LL.B. in 1889. He was promptly admitted to practice in Howard County, Missouri.

== Career in Oklahoma ==
A week after graduation, Sharp traveled to Indian Territory, where he attended the first session of the newly created United States court at Muskogee. He then moved on to Purcell, (Note: Now known as Purcell, Oklahoma) where he settled and opened his own law office. His first major public act on behalf of the town was to deliver the welcoming address at the joint meeting to organize the Indian Territory and Oklahoma Press Association on April 30, 1899.

According to Thoburn, Sharp was considered a lifelong member of the Democratic Party. He was very involved in organizing the party and serving as a leader at the organizing convention at Muskogee in 1892. From then until statehood, Sharp was a member of the Indian Territory Democratic Executive Committee. In 1900, he was one of two at-large delegates from Indian Territory to the national party convention in Kansas City. Concurrent with his party work, Sharp built up a law practice that was territory-wide in extent and importance. He also joined an association of men from 1895 to 1898 that were engaged in promoting and building the Oklahoma Central Railroad from Lehigh to Chickasha.

Thoburn then wrote that Sharp was appointed a member of the Oklahoma Supreme Court Commission on September 1, 1911, remarking that neither he nor any of his friends had solicited the nomination, and remained a member until January 11, 1915. Then he resigned from the commission to qualify as an associate justice of the Supreme Court. (Note: He had been elected to the position in November, 1914, with the provision that he would resign from the commission.) He was elected vice chief justice when the court went through its biennial reorganization in January, 1915.

== Personal and family ==
Sharp married Miss Bessie C. Pickerel of Arkansas City, Kansas on November 23, 1892. (Note: She was a native of Knox County, Illinois.) Thoburn was evidently quite impressed with her, for he wrote that she was, "... a woman of broad culture and should be credited with an important share in her husband's advancement to eminence in Oklahoma's affairs." The couple had two children, a daughter and a son.

== Death ==
Sharp died at the age of 62 in Rochester, Minnesota on March 9, 1927. His body was returned to Oklahoma City, where a funeral service was held at St. Paul's Episcopal Church. He was then interred in the mausoleum at Fairlawn Cemetery. He was predeceased by his wife, Bessie and survived by his son, John F. Sharp, Jr., and his daughter, Mrs. J. F. Buck of Shawnee.
