= James I. Phelps =

American judge (1875–1947)

- Born: James Ivey Phelps; June 20, 1875; Newton, Texas
- Died: 1947; Oklahoma City
- Occupations: Attorney; Justice of the Oklahoma Supreme Court

James Ivey Phelps (June 20, 1875 – 1947) was a justice of the Oklahoma Supreme Court from 1925 to 1929, and again in 1935.

== Early life ==
He was born in Newton, Texas to Elza V., a farmer, and Mary A. (Simmons) Phelps. Elza was a native of Louisiana, and Mary was from Mississippi. James finished his public school education in Newton, Texas then entered and graduated from Ford College in Newton. He then enrolled in the law department at Texas State University, (now called the University of Texas at Austin), where he graduated on June 14, 1899. The day after graduation, he took a train to El Reno, (then in Oklahoma Territory), where he was admitted to the Territorial Bar Association. He established himself quickly in El Reno legal circles, as well as the local Democratic Party, and became the town's Police Judge in 1900-01.

== Judicial career ==
Phelps resigned as Police Judge in 1901 to become Probate Judge for Canadian County, a position he held until Oklahoma became a state on November 16, 1907. Active in Democratic Party activities, he became chairman of the Canadian County Democratic Central Committee. He was elected judge of the 13th District court in 1918 and served until 1924, when he was appointed to complete the unexpired term of Supreme Court Justice, Matthew J. Kane. He ran again in 1929 and won election for a full term. However, after he won another term in 1936, he resigned in 1938, citing ill health as the reason.

== Family ==
On February 1, 1903, Judge Phelps married Miss Lydia B. Malcolm, daughter of J. F. and Phoebe Malcolm of El Reno. She was an El Reno school teacher, with whom he had two children, Thelma and Frank T. (Note: Lydia (d. 1938) and both children predeceased James. In 1940, James married Mrs. Lura McAlester, widow of the founder of McAlester, Oklahoma. James and Lura had no children together.)

== See also ==
- List of justices of the Oklahoma Supreme Court

== Notes ==
Political offices
Preceded by Matthew J. Kane; Thomas G. Andrews	Justice of the Oklahoma Supreme Court; 1925–1929; 1935–1935	Succeeded by Thomas G. Andrews; Thurman S. Hurst
