= George M. Nicholson =

American judge (1874–1963)

- Born: May 30, 1874; Riley County, Kansas
- Died: Death date missing Death place missing
- Other names: George Mansel Nicholson
- Occupations: attorney; Justice of the Oklahoma Supreme Court (1921-1927); Chief Justice (1928-1929)

George Mansel Nicholson (1874 – January 16, 1963) was a justice of the Oklahoma Supreme Court from 1921 to 1927, serving as chief justice from 1925 to 1927.

== Early life ==
George M. Nicholson was born May 30, 1874, to George E. Nicholson, a native of Carthage, Missouri, and a Methodist minister, and his wife, Ida Carpenter, a native of Muscatine, Iowa. They moved to Riley County, Kansas, shortly before their son was born, his elementary education was in the public schools there. He quit school when he was 15 years old, so he could support himself as a farm hand. Concurrently, he started reading law in the office of Thomas Beery in Ness City, Kansas. A diligent student, he passed the bar exam in 1894. George practiced law in Ness City until 1898, when he moved to Lincoln, Nebraska." He remained there until 1903, when he moved to the town of Sulphur in the Chickasaw Nation, of the Indian Territory (now Sulphur, Oklahoma). Before Oklahoma became a state in November 1907, George M. served as City Attorney of Sulphur. George M. acquired about 4,000 acres (16 km^{2}) of farm land in Bryan, Carter, Johnston, Murray and Pontotoc Counties. The Nicholsons lived in Sulphur, along with their four children.

Nicholson was appointed as Associate Justice of the Oklahoma Supreme Court in 1922, serving in the court's District 2 until 1927. He served as chief justice in 1926 and 1927. After retiring from the court, he opened a private law practice in Oklahoma City in 1927. He retired from practice in 1959.

== Personal ==
=== Family ===
In 1903, George M. Nicholson married Miss Julia Sheldon of Trinidad, Colorado, in Tecumseh, Oklahoma.They had four children. Julie died in 1919. George married Edith Cole on July 21, 1927.

Nicholson died at his home in Oklahoma City at the age of 88, survived by Edith.

=== Memberships ===
George M. Nicholson belongs to :

- Member, Murray Co, Bar Association;
- Oklahoma State Bar Association;
- American Bar Association;
- Methodist church
- Republican

Political offices
Preceded by Frank M. Bailey	Justice of the Oklahoma Supreme Court; 1921–1927	Succeeded by Robert A. Hefner
