= Samuel W. Hayes =

American lawyer (1875–1941)

5th Chief Justice of the Oklahoma Supreme Court
- In office 1913–1914
- Preceded by: John B. Turner
- Succeeded by: Matthew John Kane

Justice of the Oklahoma Supreme Court
- In office November 16, 1907 – 1914
- Preceded by: Position established
- Succeeded by: F. E. Riddle

Personal details
- Born: Samuel Wesley Hayes; September 17, 1875 Huntsville, Arkansas
- Died: March 14, 1941 (aged 65) Oklahoma City

Samuel W. Hayes (1875–1941) was born in Arkansas, and moved to Texas with his parents when he was a small child. He completed his basic education in Texas, then attended the University of Virginia. He apparently did not graduate, but his college experience sufficed to qualify him as a school teacher. He spent the next three years teaching in the community of Ryan in the Chickasaw Nation, then part of the Indian Territory. He also began studying law in a local law office and was admitted to the Territorial Bar in 1899.

After becoming a lawyer, he moved to Chickasha, joined a law firm, and became active in Democratic party politics. Noticed by party officials, he was elected as a delegate to the Oklahoma Constitutional Convention in Guthrie in 1906. (Note: Guthrie was then the capital of Oklahoma Territory.) After Oklahoma became a state in 1907, President Theodore Roosevelt named him as an associate justice on the Oklahoma State supreme Court, where he served until he resigned in 1914. He then returned to his private law practice in Oklahoma City. He also served as a regent of the University of Oklahoma, a director of the 10th District of the Federal Reserve Bank and as President of the Oklahoma City Chamber of Commerce until his death in 1941.

== Early life and education ==
Samuel W. Hayes was born in Huntsville, Arkansas, on September 17, 1875, to John and Molly (née Cox) Hayes. In 1877, the family moved to Jack County, Texas, where his parents worked on a farm and the boy received his basic education in the public schools. He then attended the University of Virginia before coming to what would become the state of Oklahoma in 1897, where he taught school in the town of Ryan, then a part of the Chickasaw Nation in Indian Territory for three years. (Note: At statehood, in 1907, Ryan became part of Jefferson County, Oklahoma.)

== Career in law and politics ==
Hayes began his legal studies in the Ryan office of an attorney who was a member of the Territorial Bar, and was admitted to the bar in 1899, also formed a partnership with local attorney, Eugene E. Morris. In 1900, he began his political and legal career by serving as the Ryan City Attorney. In 1902, he moved to the larger town of Chickasha, Oklahoma, and joined the Welborn & Hayes law practice.

The Democratic Party unanimously elected Hayes as a delegate to the Oklahoma Constitutional Convention in Guthrie in 1906. He was then selected as a member of a committee of three to go to Washington, D.C., to meet and request his approval for the proposed Oklahoma constitution with President Theodore Roosevelt and Attorney General Charles J. Bonaparte. The President initially had some reservations about granting statehood, and the Attorney General had already publicly indicated his opposition to the idea. Subsequently, Roosevelt ignored Bonaparte's objections and granted his own approval. There was no longer any organized disapproval among Washington politicians. After statehood became official on November 17, 1907, President Roosevelt appointed Hayes to the first Oklahoma State Supreme Court, where he served until 1914.

Chickasha happened to lie within the boundaries of what would be designated as Grady County, Oklahoma, at the time of statehood. (Note: Before Oklahoma became a state, this area was in Pickens County, a part of the Chickasaw Nation in Indian Territory.) Judge Samuel W. Hayes, chose the county name during the Constitutional Convention to honor Henry W. Grady, an editor of the Atlanta Constitution and a prominent Southern orator. Chickasha was designated as the county seat of Grady County.

Hayes became more widely known in political circles as a result of his work at the Constitutional Convention. He was chosen as chairman of the legal advisory committee and the committee on schedules, besides being a member of the important judiciary committee and on the Federal relations committee. He was also selected as a member of a committee of three to go to Washington, D.C., to meet with President Theodore Roosevelt and Attorney General Charles J. Bonaparte. The President had some reservations about granting statehood, and the Attorney General had already publicly indicated his opposition to the idea.

After statehood became official on November 17, 1907, President Roosevelt appointed Hayes to the first Oklahoma State Supreme Court, where he served until 1914.

On January 1, 1915, Judge Hayes joined the Cottingham & Bledsoe law firm, which was housed in Oklahoma City's Colcord Building. James R. Cottingham had come to Oklahoma from Kansas in 1892, and formed a partnership with Henry Asp. (Note: Cottingham had previously worked in the law department of the Santa Fe railroad, and continued to handle much of their legal work in his new capacity) When Asp moved to Oklahoma City in 1902, Cottingham partnered with S. T. Bledsoe, who also moved to Chicago on January 1, 1915. Judge Hayes apparently picked up the general legal business, much as Bledsoe had done, so that Cottingham could continue his focus on railroad legal work.

== Post Supreme Court ==
In 1919, Judge Hayes was appointed a regent of the University of Oklahoma; In 1938, he became a member of Board of Directors of the Federal Reserve Bank of the Tenth District; In 1940, he became president, Oklahoma City Chamber of Commerce, serving until his death.

== Personal life ==
Judge Hayes married Ida Poole on October 8, 1899. She was the daughter of Thomas F. and Margaret Poole, who lived in Ryan. The marriage produced three children: Kenton B., Ruby and Ida. Samuel's wife Ida died on March 24, 1910. Judge Hayes married Mamie McCulloch in June, 1912. Mamie was a native of Tennessee, but at the time of her marriage to Hayes was head of the English Department in the Northwestern Normal School of Oklahoma at Alva. (Note: The school is now known as Northwestern Oklahoma State University.)

Judge Hayes died March 14, 1941, at the Oklahoma City home where he and Mamie lived at the time. He was buried in Rose Hill Cemetery in Chickasha.

== Electoral history ==
1907 Oklahoma Supreme Court District 4 election
| Party | Candidate | Votes | % | ±% |
|---|---|---|---|---|
| Democratic | Samuel W. Hayes | 131,902 | 54.8 | New |
| Republican | Frank E. Gillette | 99,715 | 41.4 | New |
| Socialist | A.L. Loudermilk | 9,078 | 3.7 | New |
| Democratic gain from | | Swing | N/A | |

1908 Oklahoma Supreme Court 4th district Democratic primary (August 4, 1908)
| Party | Candidate | Votes | % |
|---|---|---|---|
| Democratic | Samuel W. Hayes (Incumbent) | 10,216 | 100% |

1908 Oklahoma Supreme Court 4th district election
| Party | Candidate | Votes | % | ±% |
|---|---|---|---|---|
| Democratic | Samuel W. Hayes | 120,657 | 48.2 | −6.6% |
| Republican | Joseph Dickerson | 108,577 | 43.4% | +2% |
| Socialist | A.W. Bennett | 21,089 | 8.4% | +4.7% |
| Democratic hold | | Swing | N/A | |
