= John H. Pitchford =

American jurist and attorney

- Born: March 8, 1857; Walhalla, South Carolina
- Died: March 2, 1923 (aged 65); Oklahoma City
- Occupations: Attorney; judge
- Years active: 1878-1923
- Known for: Justice of the Oklahoma Supreme Court;

John H. Pitchford (1857-1923) was an American jurist from Walhalla, South Carolina, descended from Irish immigrant ancestors. (Note: His father, Wesley, was born in Georgia, and his mother, Margaret (nee Neville) was born in South Carolina.) Pitchdford was raised in Walhalla and completed his early education at Newberry College. He then studied law in a private law office, and was admitted to the bar on his 21st birthday (March 8, 1878). (Note: According to B. L. Tisinger, one of the speakers at Pitchford's memorial service, Pitchford's mentor was Logan E. Bleckley, who then lived in Clayton, Georgia.) His first legal practice was in Clayton, Georgia, but he soon moved to the city of Gainesville, Georgia.

== Moving west ==
Although his law practice in Georgia prospered, Pitchford decided to move west in 1890, settling for a few years in Fort Smith, Arkansas, and forming a partnership with Col. Ben T. DuVal. In 1896, he moved again, this time into Indian Territory, where he settled in Talequah and set up a new law practice. He became a popular figure in Talequah, where he was elected mayor in 1900, the first white man elected to that office. (Note: According to Thoburn, He was elected to office mainly to show the outside world that Talequah, then the capital of the Cherokee Nation, was not prejudiced against whites who had moved there.) At the end of one year, he stepped down to return to private practice. In 1907, after Oklahoma became a state, Pitchford was elected as the first judge of the First Judicial District of Oklahoma. He was re-elected in 1910 for a term ending in 1919, even as his district expanded to include Adair, Cherokee, Delaware and Sequoyah counties.

In state elections held in 1918, Pitchford ran for and won the Democratic Party nomination for Associate Justice of the Oklahoma Supreme Court in August, then beat his Republican Party opponent.

Thoburn gave Pitchford high marks for fairness, and impartiality in his courtroom.

== Death and commemoration ==
Law Notes reported that John H. Pitchford died March 2, 1923, at his home in Oklahoma City.

On April 16, 1923, the Supreme Court called a special session to commemorate three people who had died in March or early April: John H. Pitchford, late Chief Justice, C. H. Elting, Associate Justice and Hon. E. G. McAdams, late Supreme Court Referee. Pitchford's replacement as Chief Justice, was Napoleon B. Johnson, who gave the closing address. (Note: Ironically, Justice Johnson, was one of three justices accused of bribery and subsequently removed from the court nearly 40 years later in the Oklahoma Supreme Court Scandal.)

(Note: (Editor's note)Individually and collectively, these commemorative speeches are too long to be quoted or even paraphrased in an encyclopedic article. Significant pieces have often been quoted by other writers, sometimes without attribution. For example, in Thoburn's 1916 book, cited above. Readers interested in learning more about political speechmaking may find reading these memorials a fascinating experience when compared to that used in the first two decades of the 21st Century, when no holds are barred on any occasion. There was evidence of a real camaraderie on the 1923 court that no longer seems visible today.)

== Organizations ==
Judge Pitchford belonged to the following organizations:

- Independent Order of Odd Fellows (IOOF)
- Royal Arch Chapter of Masonry
- Methodist Church
- Democratic Party

== Personal ==
Pitchford first married Lola Bauknight, with whom he had two children, Joseph Irvin Pitchford and Henry DuVal Pitchford. Joseph later became a lawyer in Sallisaw, Oklahoma, while Henry became a lawyer at Stilwell, Oklahoma. After Lola's death, Pitchford married Miss Viola Boggess.
