= Ben Arnold (judge) =

Justice of the Oklahoma Supreme Court

- Born: Benjamin Cleveland Arnold; February 19, 1891; Newark, Arkansas, U.S.
- Died: September 30, 1955 (aged 64); Oklahoma City, Oklahoma, U.S.
- Other names: Ben C. Arnold, Benjamin C. Arnold
- Occupation(s): Attorney, Judge
- Known for: Associate Justice of Oklahoma Supreme Court (1941-1953), Chief Justice of Oklahoma Supreme Court (1951-1953)
- Notable work: Determined that oil drilling on capitol grounds is under the jurisdiction of the state and not of the city (1936)

Benjamin Cleveland Arnold (1891–1972) was an attorney and judge in Oklahoma. He earned a B. A. degree in 1920 and a law degree in 1924 from Oklahoma University. His first judgeship was as a district judge in Oklahoma County, near Wister, Oklahoma. In 1941, Governor Leon C. Phillips appointed Arnold as Associate Justice on the Oklahoma Supreme Court, representing District 3. He served as chief justice from 1951 to 1953. Arnold died while in office on September 30, 1955, and was succeeded by Albert C. Hunt.

During the 1930s, Oklahoma City officials established a new drilling zone inside the city, including a 1 square mile (2.6 km^{2}) area around the state capitol building. In March 1936, Governor E. W. Marland ordered the National Guard into the Oklahoma City field to prevent civil process servers from ordering the oil field workers to shut down production. Arnold declared that the property was state land and that city officials had no jurisdiction over it.

A genealogy site states that Arnold's full name was Benjamin Cleveland Arnold, son of Martin Luther Arnold and Nancy Elizabeth (née Hughes), and that he was born February 19, 1891, in Newark, Arkansas, and had nine siblings. The same site also stated that he died March, 1972 in Oklahoma City. The death year should be 1955, according to other sources. He was interred in Oklahoma City at Memorial Park Cemetery.
