= Robert M. Rainey =

American judge (1882–1971)

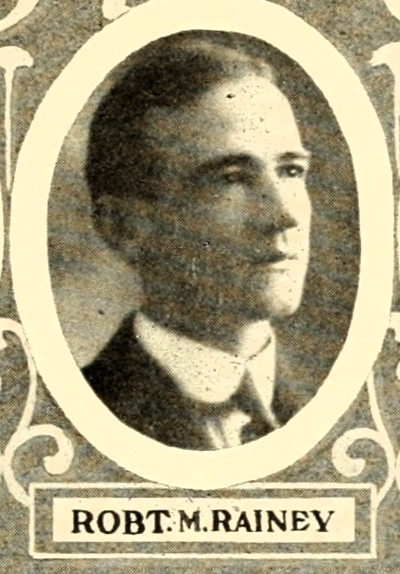
- Rainey circa 1907
- Born: Robert Minter Rainey; September 29, 1882; Sherman, Grayson County, Texas
- Died: April 3, 1971 (aged 88); Oklahoma City
- Other names: Robert M. Rainey
- Occupations: Politician, Served in House of Representatives (1907-1909, Attorney, District Judge (1907-1909), Associate Justice of Oklahoma Supreme Court (1917-21), Chief Justice (1920-21),
- Known for: Authored House Bill that established the Oklahoma Court of Criminal Appeals.

Robert Minter Rainey (September 29, 1882 – April 3, 1971) was a justice of the Oklahoma Supreme Court from 1917 to 1921, serving as chief justice from 1920 to 1921. Elected to the State of Oklahoma's first House of Representatives (1907-8), he is also noted as having written legislation to create the Oklahoma Court of Criminal Appeals.

== Early life ==
Robert M. Rainey was born in Sherman, Texas to Judge Jesse Rainey and Annie Moore Rainey on September 29, 1882. Robert grew up in Sherman, graduating from high school there with a scholarship. He attended the University of Texas for two years, then enrolled in Cumberland University, where he obtained a degree in law. In 1904, he moved to Indian Territory, where he went to work in the Atoka office of the Dawes Commission as a reporter.

Judge Rainey was elected a member of the first Oklahoma House of Representatives after statehood in 1907, serving through 1908. One of the many laws he authored created the Oklahoma Criminal Court of Appeals. He was appointed as a District Judge in 1909. In 1914, he was a candidate for the Second District judge of the Oklahoma Supreme Court, succeeding Justice Williams, then candidate for Governor. Rainey lost that election to Judge Rufus Hardy. Returning to his position as District Judge, he became an expert on improving judicial procedures, especially reducing the time and cost of trials. In 1913, he presented to the annual meeting of the Oklahoma Bar Association, a paper that he had written, "How to Avoid the Law's Delays under Present Procedure."

In 1917, he became an associate justice of the Oklahoma Supreme Court, then was appointed Chief Justice during 1920 to 1921. After his term ended, he returned to Atoka to practice law privately.

== Personal ==
On August 12, 1905, Robert M. Rainey married Lillian Fryer (1885 – 1906). They had four children, three sons and a daughter. Robert died April 3, 1971, and was buried in Fairlawn Cemetery, Oklahoma City.

== Organization memberships ==
- Methodist church (South)
- Sigma Alpha Epsilon
- Freemasons
- Knights Templar
