= J. H. Langley =

Justice of the Oklahoma Supreme Court (1867–1935)

Justice of the Oklahoma Supreme Court
- In office January 1931 – February 2, 1931

Personal details
- Born: J. Howard Langley; July 8, 1867 McDonald County, Missouri, U.S.
- Died: October 27, 1935 (aged 68) Pryor, Oklahoma, U.S.
- Party: Democratic
- Spouse: Octave Brock (m. 1894)
- Children: 3
- Occupation: Merchant; attorney; jurist
- Known for: First chairman, Grand River Dam Authority (GRDA)

J. Howard Langley (1867 – 1935) was a justice of the Oklahoma Supreme Court for less than one month from January, 1931 until February 2, 1931. His term was truncated by health problems that he blamed on the rigors of campaigning for the office. Born and educated in Missouri, Langley moved to Indian Territory in 1891, where he entered the mercantile business. He became licensed to practice law in 1897, and moved to the town of Pryor to begin private practice. He was elected a delegate to the Oklahoma Constitutional Convention in 1905, where he gained much public exposure. After statehood, he returned to his private practice in Pryor, until he entered the race for a Supreme Court seat in 1930. Although he won the election, he served less than a month before resigning on account of ill health. After recovering, at least partially, he was named to the board of directors for the Grand River dam project and was elected chairman. He did not live to see the project completed, dying in 1935.

== Early life ==
Langley was born on a farm on July 8, 1867, in McDonald County, Missouri to William G. Langley and Jane (Gist) Langley. He got his basic education in the "common schools" of McDonald County and in the Southwest City, Missouri High School. He also attended Scarritt College in Neosho, Missouri. He learned law by studying at home, taking courses through Sprague's Correspondence Law School of Detroit, Michigan. He taught in a local school while completing his law program.

== Move to Indian Territory ==
In 1891, he entered the mercantile business in the town of Adair, Indian Territory. That was the same year when he married Miss Susan Brock, from Siloam Springs, Arkansas. (Note: Susan Brock was the daughter of W. C. Brock, and Martha Brock, nee Tacket.)

The United States District Court at Vinita, Indian Territory licensed Langley to practice law in 1897. He and his family moved to Pryor, where he opened a private practice in partnership with Judge A. C. Brewster. There, he became a founding member of, and avid participant in, the Christian Church, even serving as superintendent of its Sunday School for many years.

Langley was elected as a Delegate from the 65th District to the Oklahoma Constitutional Convention. He worked diligently on the committees on Contests, Preamble and Bill of Rights, Municipal Corporation, Judiciary, Judicial Department, Ordinances and Separation of Races in Public Conveyances. (Note: While serving at the convention, he proposed "Mayes' as the name for his home county. This was to honor the Mayes family which had given the Cherokee Nation two principal chiefs. One of them, Samuel H. Mayes, had been Langley's long-time personal friend.) He even served as Chairman of the Committee several times. After the convention was over and statehood was accomplished in 1907, he returned to his law practice in Pryor.

When the U.S. became involved in World War I, he accepted a job as a member of and legal adviser to the Council of Defense, He was recognized for his distinguished service by the War Department.

Returning to private law practice, he helped Mayes County build a courthouse without having to issue bonds, and at a reasonable cost. He also assisted the City of Tulsa in litigations to acquire land along Spavinaw Creek for its water project. His tact and friendship with many of the litigants are credited with making the project a success, that still serves its intended purposes nearly a century later.

== Election to Oklahoma Supreme Court ==
In 1930, Langley entered the race for election to become Justice of the Supreme Court of Oklahoma, from District No. 1. He won the race in the first and second primary, becoming the Democratic party nominee, and was elected in the general election. He took the oath of office on January 12, 1931.

His victory was short. Responding to a questionnaire about former members of the Constitutional Convention, he wrote: "...so completely wrecked myself in the campaign as to render myself wholly unfit for a creditable discharge of the duties of the office, and rather than half-fill the office, resigned February 2, 1931. Thanks to our method of selecting the Judiciary."

== After the Supreme Court ==
Langley's health and vigor seemed to gradually return. He took a great interest in the construction of three dams along the Grand River, one of which would be in his home county. When the state legislature created the Grand River Dam Authority (GRDA), the Oklahoma Attorney General named Langley to the board of directors. They, in turn, elected him as chairman.

== Personal life ==
Langley married Octave Brock of Adair in 1894. They had three children. Paul, their first born, died at the age of four.

Langley did not live to see the Grand River project completed. He died at his Pryor home in bed on October 27, 1935. He was buried in Pryor's Fairview Cemetery, on a hill overlooking the Grand River valley. He was commemorated by a red granite stone with a bronze memorial tablet placed the courthouse lawn. The town of Langley, Oklahoma is named in his honor.
