= Frank E. Gillette =

American politician (1848–1923)

- Born: January 7, 1848; Ashtabula County, Ohio, U.S.
- Died: February 18, 1923 (aged 75); El Reno, Oklahoma, U.S.
- Occupations: Attorney, politician
- Years active: 1876-?
- Known for: Last appointee as Associate Justice of the Oklahoma Territorial Supreme Court

Frank E. Gillette was an American politician and attorney. He was one of the last judges appointed to the Supreme Court of Oklahoma Territory. He was appointed by President Theodore Roosevelt in 1902, and served until the court was abolished after statehood was granted to Oklahoma on November 16, 1907. Born in Ashtabula County, Ohio, on January 7, 1848, Gillette had moved with his parents to Emporia, Kansas when he was thirteen. After graduating from high school, he earned a degree from Kansas State Normal School (Note: Kansas State Normal School was renamed Emporia State University in 1977.) then studied law and began to practice his profession in Hutchinson, Kansas in May, 1876. He moved to Kingman, Kansas and entered politics in 1882, where he was elected to the state legislature, representing Kingman County, and served for three terms. He was on the House Judiciary Committee, spending the last two years as chairman of that committee. He then was elected to the state senate and served for four years, which included serving as chairman of the Senate Judiciary Committee. At the end of his senatorial term, he moved to Oklahoma Territory and settled in El Reno where he opened a private law practice.

On May 2, 1902, Congress created two additional positions on the Oklahoma Territory Supreme Court. President Theodore Roosevelt appointed Gillette to one court seat, and J. L. Pancoast of Blackwell, Oklahoma, was appointed to the other new position (Note: the 6th District, covering Woods, Beaver, Day and Dewey Counties. The 7th Circuit covered Caddo, Comanche, Kiowa and Greer Counties. These territorial positions were abolished when statehood took effect.)

The Oklahoma Republican Party nominated Gillette as Associate Justice of the new Oklahoma Supreme Court. He did not win, but got the second highest number of votes of any Republican candidate on the ballot. (Note: A Democratic tide that year swept away every Republican candidate who ran for state office.) He then joined the law firm of Gillette, Libby and Gillette in El Reno. When Oklahoma was admitted as a state in 1907, he was appointed as the Republican member of the Oklahoma Election Board.

Gillette died in El Reno on February 18, 1923, at the age of 75.

== Electoral history ==
1907 Oklahoma Supreme Court District 4 election
Party	Candidate	Votes	%	±%
Democratic	Samuel W. Hayes	131,902	54.8	New
Republican	Frank E. Gillette	99,715	41.4	New
Socialist	A.L. Loudermilk	9,078	3.7	New
Democratic gain from		Swing	N/A	
