= Robert H. Loofbourrow =

American judge (1873–1926)

- Born: January 29, 1873; Marion County, Illinois, US
- Died: October 21, 1926 (aged 53); Buffalo, Harper County, Oklahoma, US
- Occupation: Attorney
- Years active: 1896–1915
- Known for: Justice of the Oklahoma Supreme Court from 1913 to 1915.

Robert H. Loofbourrow (1873–1926) was a justice of the Oklahoma Supreme Court from 1913 to 1915.

== Early life ==
Robert H. Loofbourrow was born January 29, 1873, to Orlando J. and Sarah T. Loofbourrow in Marion County, Illinois. While Robert was still very young, the family moved to Missouri and then to Kansas, where Orlando became a successful farmer and cattleman. Robert got his basic education in school in Kansas public schools. In 1890, the family moved to what is now Beaver County, Oklahoma. He decided to become a lawyer, and enrolled in the Iowa College of Law in Des Moines, Iowa. He withdrew from the college before graduation, but continued his legal studies under preceptors in Beaver, where he was admitted to the territorial bar in 1896, after being examined at the District Court. He served as the Beaver County Attorney from 1897 to 1899, then was made Assistant County Attorney for the next three years. He was elected County Attorney again in 1904, and held this position until statehood (1907). He then became judge of the 19th Judicial District.

On September 1, 1913, he was appointed Associate Justice of the Oklahoma Supreme Court, retiring from the District Court position. However, he stepped down from this position in January, 1915, because he wanted to return home to his private law practice in Beaver. Back home, he became a director of the Bank of Beaver and an owner of considerable real estate.

== Personal life ==
Robert Loofbourrow married Miss Bertha L. Graves, daughter of Ansel Graves of Beaver. Robert and Bertha had three sons: Wade Harold (1898–1986), Robert Bernard (1900–1942) and Hale.
