= Albert C. Hunt =

American judge (1888–1956)

- Born: Albert Clarence Hunt; July 30, 1888; Clarksville, Arkansas, US
- Died: August 26, 1956 (aged 68); Oklahoma City, Oklahoma, US
- Occupations: Attorney, judge
- Years active: 1909-1956
- Known for: Only Oklahoma Supreme Court Justice to serve from 2 different Supreme Court Districts

Albert C. Hunt (1888–1956) was an American lawyer and judge. He was the only person to serve on the Oklahoma Supreme Court from two different districts.

== Early life ==
Hunt was born to William T. and Mattie Rose Hunt in Clarksville, Arkansas, on July 30, 1888. He and his parents moved to Wagoner, Cherokee Nation, Indian Territory (now Oklahoma) in 1895.

He graduated from Missouri Military Academy in Mexico, Missouri, in 1906, then attended Vanderbilt University, where he received an LLB law degree in 1909. In the same year, he was admitted to the Oklahoma Bar, and began practicing law in Wagoner. He served as the Wagoner City Attorney from 1909 to 1915, then moved to Tulsa, Oklahoma in 1917.

On November 24, 1914, he married Essie Joel Hayden of Chouteau, Oklahoma. The couple had three children: Elizabeth Hayden, Albert C., and John W. Hunt.

== Career ==
Hunt began practicing law in 1909 in Wagoner. He served 6 years as the Wagoner city attorney, after which he entered private practice. In 1921, he left private practice to serve as a district judge of the 21st Judicial District of Oklahoma from 1921 to 1925, when he was appointed to the position by Oklahoma Governor James B. A. Robertson. He was elected to the Oklahoma Supreme Court from the Tulsa District, serving from 1925 to 1931. After finishing his last term on the court, the family moved to Oklahoma City, where he opened his own law practice. (Note: An article about the award named for Justice Hunt said that in 1931, Justice Hunt went into a law practice with his father, W. T, Hunt.) He remained in private practice for ten years, until 1941, when Governor Leon C. Phillips appointed Hunt to be district judge of the 7th Judicial District in 1941, where he served by 5 years. During this period he was also chairman of the State Election Board of Oklahoma.

After Supreme Court Justice Ben Arnold of the Oklahoma City Supreme Court District, died in 1946, then-governor Raymond Gary appointed Hunt to fill the resulting vacancy. According to his obituary, "Justice Hunt had the unusual distinction of having served as District Judge from two separate district court jurisdictions as well as from two separate Supreme Court districts of Oklahoma." Justice Hunt died in Oklahoma City on August 26, 1956.

== Capitol art donation ==
Hunt and Cason commissioned a bronze statue from artist Constance Whitney Warren that would be displayed on the grounds of the Oklahoma State Capitol. The statue, depicting a cowboy riding a bucking bronco, was titled "Tribute to the Range Riders". It was scheduled to be dedicated on May 30, 1930, by Governor William J. Holloway and Hunt. The dedication was postponed, reportedly because Will Rogers could not attend. (Note: However, Holloway's predecessor, former Governor William H. Murray, was known to hate Rogers' political support of Franklin Delano Roosevelt. Murray ordered the statue covered by a tarpaulin.) The dedication was finally performed by Governor Raymond Gary on November 14, 1957.

== Other activities ==
- President of the Oklahoma Conference of District Judges, 1948–49;
- Member of the Judicial Council of Oklahoma, 1944 until his death;
- Member of the American Bar Association;
- Member of the executive board of the Boy Scouts of America for 20 years;
- Headed the Last Frontier Council of the Boy Scouts of America in 1947 and 1948;
- Member of Phi Delta Phi, honorary legal fraternity;
- Life member of the Oklahoma Historical Society.

== Legacy ==
The Albert C. Hunt Excellence in Clinical Advocacy Award at the University of Oklahoma School of Law is endowed by Hunt's family. The award was originally named the Albert C. Hunt Practice Court Award and the name was changed in 2007. The award is given to the practice court firm that has "...demonstrated the most careful and thorough preparation for the trial of their case in the practice court class/courtroom." Two students are recommended by the Legal Clinic faculty at the law school and selected by the director of the Legal Clinic. Winners are determined based on their demonstrated ability to:

- effectively use factual and legal analysis to identify, diagnose, and address problems in terms of client objectives;
- generate strategies to achieve those objectives;
- effectively present the most favorable case for the client; and
- achieve a favorable resolution, either through direct negotiation, mediation, or litigation in a significant case.
