= Eugene Lester =

American attorney and judge (1871–1940)

Eugene F. Lester
- Born: August 7, 1871; Lebanon, Tennessee, U.S.
- Died: July 25, 1940 (aged 68); Oklahoma City, U.S.
- Occupations: Attorney, Justice of the Oklahoma Supreme Court (1924-1931), Chief Justice, 1931-2
- Years active: 1918–1932

Eugene F. Lester (1871–1940) was an American attorney and judge known as Chief Justice of the Oklahoma (US) Supreme Court from 1931 to 1932.

== Early life ==
Eugene F. Lester was born August 7, 1871, in Lebanon, Tennessee to Preston S. and Elizabeth (née Crutchfield). He became an attorney, moved to Oklahoma and became judge of the 5th Judicial District from 1918 to 1924. In 1924, he was named to the Oklahoma Supreme Court, where he served until 1931. (Note: No source consulted has indicated that Lester had any formal law school training. Presumably, he qualified for the bar by reading law, a rather common practice, especially in the United States at that time.) He also served as chief justice of the Supreme Court from 1931 to 1932. He was a member of the Disciples of Christ church, Free Masons and Odd Fellows.

While serving as Chief Justice, Lester represented Oklahoma in a University of North Carolina study that examined the practices of six state supreme courts in trying to be more efficient by sitting in divisions rather than en banc while hearing cases. (Note: The states considered were: California, Colorado, Florida, Georgia, Kansas, Louisiana, Mississippi, Missouri and Virginia.)

== Death ==
A brief notice in the Emporia Gazette in Emporia, Kansas, stated that Lester's body was found in an Oklahoma City hotel room with a bullet wound to the head. A note in the room indicated that he took his own life on July 25, 1940, because of ill health. The acting coroner ruled the death a suicide and gave no other details.

His daughter, Doris Lester Burns, survived him. She died in Pittsburgh, Pennsylvania, at the age of 86, on September 24, 1993, where she had lived for many years. Both her husband, Chester Parker Burns, and her mother, Beulah Collier Lester, had preceded her in death.
