= Charles M. Thacker =

American judge (1866–1918)

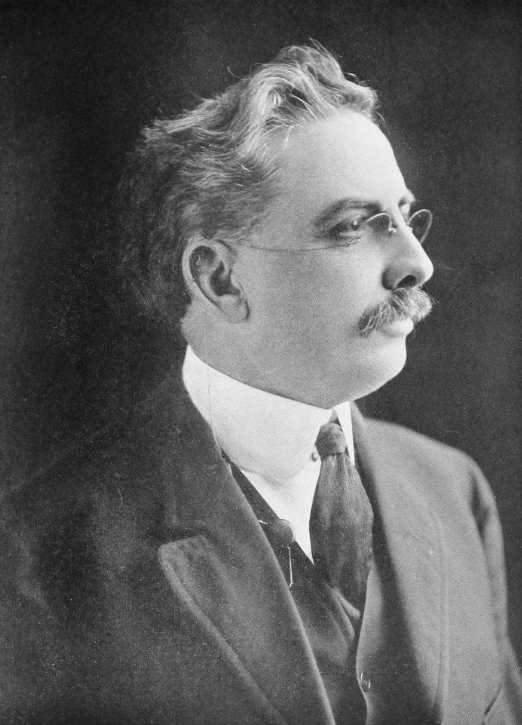

Justice of the Oklahoma Supreme Court
- In office 1915–1918

Oklahoma Supreme Court Commissioner
- In office March 19, 1913 – November 2, 1915
- Appointed by: Oklahoma Supreme Court; Robert L. Williams
- Preceded by: C. B. Ames
- Succeeded by: Nestor Rummons

Member of the Oklahoma Territorial Council from the 13th district
- In office 1899–1901
- Preceded by: D. P. Marum
- Succeeded by: George B. Harrison

Personal details
- Born: January 17, 1866 Brunswick County, Virginia, US
- Died: February 17, 1918 (aged 52) Oklahoma City, Oklahoma, US
- Occupation: Attorney, newspaper publisher, politician, judge

Charles M. Thacker (1866–1918) was a justice of the Oklahoma Supreme Court from 1915 to 1918.

== Biography ==
Charles M. Thacker was born January 17, 1866, and raised on his father's farm in Brunswick County, Virginia. He moved to Texas, settling first in Ennis, where he managed to find work as a scribe and general helper for an elderly man who was researching what he called "lost titles" to Texas lands. This job lasted about a year, long enough for Thacker to realize that he would never earn enough money to return to Virginia to settle down. He decided to learn bookkeeping, so that he could at least support himself with a regular salary. He took a few courses, but seized an opportunity to work in a law office and learn the subject while doing work for the owners of the practice. After about one year of "reading the law," he was admitted to the bar on June 20, 1888, by the District Court in Dallas. He soon got a job with a bookkeeping firm, but the firm went out of business before even paying his first month's salary. Besides, his health was suffering, so Thacker decided to move to a higher altitude and drier climate in northwestern Texas. A friend gave him five dollars and some charitable lawyers gave him some old law books so he could make the journey.

After visiting several towns, Thacker moved to Mangum, (Note: Thoburn says that Magnum was just a village when Thacker arrived there, and that he had only fifty cents left in his pocket.) then in Greer County, Texas, arriving on April 29, 1889. He was appointed as county attorney in August, 1889, then resigned to start publishing a newspaper, and was appointed as county judge on February 8, 1892.

=== Life in Oklahoma ===
Thomas H. Doyle, a member of the Oklahoma Supreme court and a former colleague of Judge Thacker, described Thacker's political history in his memorial. While old Greer County was still part of Texas, Thacker had already served as county attorney and county judge. (Note: On March 16, 1896, the U.S. Supreme Court ruled that old Greer County belonged in Oklahoma Territory, and not in the state of Texas.) Thacker had been elected to the "upper house of the Territorial Assembly" from the 13th District in 1898. (Note: At that time, the 13th District consisted of Beaver, Woodward, Day, Dewey, Custer, Washita, Roger Mills, and Greer Counties.) He was then elected County Attorney and County Judge of Greer County, Oklahoma in 1900. He continued to hold office by winning successive elections until Oklahoma attained statehood in 1907. During that time, he also served as a member of the board of regents of the territorial normal schools. He was elected as mayor of Mangum in 1909.

Thacker was appointed member-at-large to the Oklahoma Supreme Court Commission in March 1913. Governor Robert L. Williams appointed him on November 1, 1915, to fill a vacancy on the court caused by the death of Justice G. A. Brown. In 1916, he was elected to succeed himself for a full 6-year term.

=== Death ===
Charles M. Thacker died in an Oklahoma City hospital on February 17, 1918. His funeral was held February 20, 1918 in the Supreme Court chambers in the capitol. He had been ill for a week from inflammation of the pancreas, according to the Hollis Post Herald of Harmon County, Oklahoma on February 21, 1918.
