= W. H. Kornegay =

American judge (1865–1935)

- Born: Wade Hampton Kornegay; April 17, 1865; Duplin County, North Carolina
- Died: November 19, 1935 (aged 70); Vinita, Oklahoma
- Occupations: Attorney, Judge
- Known for: Delegate to Oklahoma Constitutional Convention, Oklahoma Supreme Court Justice

Wade Hampton Kornegay (1865–1935; usually addressed as W. H. Kornegay) was an attorney in private practice in Vinita, Oklahoma when he was appointed by Governor William H. Murray as an associate justice of the Oklahoma Supreme Court in 1931–2. Born in North Carolina, he received nearly all his early legal training through home study and correspondence school. He completed his formal legal training at Vanderbilt University, before moving to Vinita (then in Indian Territory) in 1891, where he started a private legal practice. He was elected as a Democratic Party delegate from Vinita to the Oklahoma Constitutional Convention. After Oklahoma became a state in 1907, he returned to his practice in Vinita.

== Early life ==
Little information is available about his early life. An obituary from the Duplin Times (Warsaw, North Carolina) said that his father was Henry Robert Kornegay, a Baptist minister, Clerk of the Superior Court, and a lawyer. His step-mother was Jeanette Williams, who had come from a well-known family in Wayne County. W. H. was the youngest of several children from his father's first marriage. (Note: Microfilm version of article available online courtesy of the Duplin Library.) Kornegay did relate that his father had fought for the Confederate Army as a private in the Civil War. His father had been wounded, and admired General Wade Hampton for the way he had treated the wounded soldiers under his command. So impressed, in fact that the father named his son for the general. The boy was the youngest of seven children.

Kornegay said that he attended the local schools (presumably in Duplin County) and entered Wake Forest College in North Carolina when he was fifteen. Obviously quite bright, he graduated in 1884 as class valedictorian with an A.M. degree. He then taught school for four years, which enabled him to take a summer course in law at the University of Virginia in 1889. He then went to Vanderbilt University, where he graduated from a law program in one year, when it normally required two years.

== Life in Indian Territory and Oklahoma ==
Kornegay apparently moved then to Indian Territory, for his biography says he lived in Vinita, Indian Territory for 48 years before his death. Also, he married Nannie Louise Stafford in the early 1890s in Indian Territory. The biography by Martin skips over most of his life thereafter, except to report that he engaged in private practice of law in Vinita and that he was a delegate to the Oklahoma Constitutional Convention, and that Governor William H. Murray had appointed him to serve on the Oklahoma Supreme Court in 1931 and 1932.

== Death ==
Kornegay died of a heart attack at his home in Vinita on November 19, 1935. He was survived by his children: Jeanette, Clarence, Wade Hampton, Jr., and Louise. He was buried in Vinita's Fairview Cemetery.

== Honors ==
- Inducted into the Oklahoma Hall of Fame, 1936
