= C. H. Elting =

American judge

Justice of the Oklahoma Supreme Court
- In office 1920–1922
- Preceded by: R. W. Higgins
- Succeeded by: C. B. Cochrane

Personal details
- Born: Cornelius Houseman Elting; October 15, 1856; Shelby County, Missouri, US
- Died: December 3, 1922 (aged 66); Durant, Oklahoma, US
- Political party: Republican

Cornelius Houseman Elting (1856–1922) was an American judge.

Elting was born on October 15, 1866, in Shelby County, Missouri. When he was thirteen years old, he moved with his parents, Richard O. and Mary Short Elting, to western Kansas. where he obtained his early education. During the winters, he attended public schools, then later attended high school and took a two-year preparatory course at Kansas University. Then he enrolled in the Kansas University School of Law and graduated with an LLB degree in 1896. He earned his a law degree at the University of Kansas School of Law in 1894 (Note: The University of Kansas indicates that he was awarded his degree in 1896.) He practiced law for a few months in West Plains, Missouri, before moving to Indian Territory in February 1897, where he settled in the community of Caddo. In 1899, he moved to what would become the present city of Durant, Oklahoma, and served as a bankruptcy referee for a few years. He soon became active in politics and joined the Republican party, winning election in 1903 as district judge for the Durant District. (Note: The 1908 city directory of Durant, Oklahoma listed him as "Elting, Cornelius H. (Sallie), commr U S Ct, r 716 N 3rd Av." Immediately below him is a separate listing for "Elting, Ruby," student, Durant Presbyterian Coll." Ed. note: No other source found that lists any possible wife or children for this C. H. Etling.)

In 1920, Elting was nominated to run for a position on the Oklahoma State Supreme Court (representing Judicial District 2), which he won at the November 1920 general election. In March, 1922, he became seriously ill, and his health continued to decline until he died at his home in Durant on December 3, 1922.
