= John T. Johnson (Oklahoma judge) =

American judge (1856–1935)

- Born: January 9, 1856; Livingston, Tennessee, US
- Died: June 9, 1935 (aged 79)
- Resting place: Lawton, Oklahoma, US
- Occupations: Attorney, Oklahoma Supreme Court Justice
- Years active: 1907-1924
- Notable work: Impeachment of Governor Walton (1923), Chief Justice (1923-25)

John T. Johnson (1856–1935) was a justice of the Oklahoma Supreme Court from 1919 to 1925 (including his service as chief justice from 1923 to 1925).

Johnson lived in Texas and Lawton, Oklahoma. He married Mary Catherine Rose (1860–1937) with whom he raised one son and two daughters. The Johnsons resided at 1004 E Avenue while in Lawton.

Johnson was a Democrat, County judge in Texas. In 1907 he was elected Lawton's first district judge after Oklahoma statehood (1907–15); justice of Oklahoma state supreme court, 1919–25; chief justice of Oklahoma state supreme court, 1923-25. Disciples of Christ. Member, Freemasons; Odd Fellows; Woodmen.

As chief justice, one of Johnson's most notable duties was to conduct the first impeachment of a governor in Oklahoma's history, John C. Walton. Ironically, chief justice Johnson had sworn in Governor-elect Walton on January 8, 1923. The impeachment trial convened on November 1, 1923. The Senate found Walton guilty on eleven of the articles and rejected five. They then voted 41 to 0 to remove Walton from office.
