= Monroe Osborn =

Oklahoma Supreme Court Justice (b. 1887, d. 1947)

- Born: July 15, 1887; Brown County, Texas
- Died: June 20, 1947 July 20, 1947 (aged 60); Oklahoma City
- Occupations: Attorney, banker, politician
- Known for: Oklahoma Supreme Court Justice
- Notable work: Administered oath of office to Major Gen. J. L. Schley, who was appointed Chief of U.S. Corps of Engineers while on official travel through Oklahoma in 1947

Monroe Osborn was a justice on the Oklahoma State Supreme Court from 1932 until his death on June 20, 1947. He served multiple terms as chief justice.

== Career ==
Monroe Osborn was born in Brown County, Texas on July 15, 1887. He reportedly came to Oklahoma in 1890 and settled in Norman, Oklahoma, where he received his basic education through high school. (Note: Harlow says that Osborn lived in Granite, Oklahoma from 1890-1895, Sulphur, Oklahoma (1895-1898), Norman, Oklahoma (1898-1905), and finally Pauls Valley, (Oklahoma), which he called home from 1905 until the end of his life.) He attended Oklahoma University for four years and University of Kansas for three years. (Note: In 1935, an Oklahoma University publication, the Sooner Magazine, published a list of graduates who had gone on to occupy high-ranking legal positions in Oklahoma counties. The list shows that Monroe Osborn (Class of 1904) graduated from OU, but did not receive a law degree there. Thus, it seems reasonable to believe he qualified to pass the bar exam by studying law in a law office.)

In October 1937, Major General Julian Larcombe Schley was named as Chief Engineer of the U.S. Army Corps of Engineers by President Franklin D. Roosevelt. At the time, Schley was traveling in Oklahoma, inspecting some of the Corps' dam-building projects in Oklahoma and Texas. Rather than interrupting his schedule for an immediate ceremony in Washington, D. C. (where such events are normally performed, he made a short hop to Oklahoma City, where Monroe Osborn, then Chief Justice of the Oklahoma Supreme Court (OSC), administered the oath of office to him, in lieu of the President. Schley then continued on his planned inspection tour.

== Banking activities ==
Harlow also indicates that Osborn worked for Exchange National Bank and Pauls Valley National Bank, both of which were located in Pauls Valley. Although he was a Democratic partisan in national politics, he was independent in local elections. He became active in politics after joining the local bar association, and served as both City Attorney for Garvin and Garvin County Attorney.

=== Skinner v. Oklahoma ===
Oklahoma was one of several states whose legislature accepted involuntary sterilization of certain felons who were considered habitual criminals because of some "genetic defect." It passed the Habitual Criminal Sterilization Act in 1935 that provided for the mandatory sterilization of people who had already been convicted of "felonies of moral turpitude," and that a jury had ruled that the procedure would not injure the felon's physical health. The Act required the State Attorney General to petition the district court for application of this sentence in any case that met these qualifications, and specified exactly which crimes would qualify and which would not. (Note: For example, larceny would qualify the felon for sterilization, but embezzlement would not. Tax law violations and "political crimes" were also exclusions.)

The first such case appealed to the Oklahoma Supreme Court under this act was a convict named Jack T. Skinner. As a youth, 1926, he had first been convicted for stealing chickens and was sentenced to a term in the state reformatory. After his release, Skinner had been arrested, tried and convicted of armed robbery in 1929, and, since he was still under legal age, resentenced to the reformatory. In 1934, he was again arrested for the crime of armed robbery. By then, he was eligible for punishment as an adult. In 1936, Attorney General Mac Q. Williamson selected Skinner for punishment by mandatory sterilization under the new law. He filed a petition in the Pittsburg County District Court to carry out the sentence. Skinner and his lawyers moved swiftly to have the case reviewed by the Oklahoma Supreme Court (OSC), making a number of claims regarding violation of his civil and constitutional rights throughout the process. The OSC agreed to take the case.

Skinner and his attorneys claimed that subjecting him to sterilization was punishment for his crimes, and thus a "cruel and unusual punishment". However, Justice Thurman S. Hurst. the writer of the majority opinion repeatedly characterized the whole process as "civil" and not "criminal" (Note: Meaning that the punishment specified by the Legislature was not subject to review by the court.) Justice Osborn, writer of the dissent, alleged that the sterilization law failed the Due Process Clause when it failed to require that the subject actually possessed inheritable criminal traits. (Note: By inference, in order to be solely civil, the law needed to show how it would improve society by preventing the convicted felon from fathering children.)

Justice Osborn went on to say that the Supreme Court should not defer to the Legislature's creation of a whole class of individuals who could be punished by depriving them of inherent constitutional rights. He asserted that by excluding a determination of whether society would actually benefit by preventing the individual from fathering children, the Law contained a fatal flw and was therefore unconstitutional. However, the individual justices remained divided and the law was not overturned at the state level.

The U.S. Supreme Court was granted certiorari to review the case on January 12, 1942.

== Organizations ==
Osborn belonged to the American Legion post in Pauls Valley.

== Personal ==
He married Rowena Moseley, and they had one daughter.
