= Thomas G. Andrews (judge) =

American judge

- Born: Thomas Galpin Andrews; August 29, 1882; Orangeburg, South Carolina
- Died: September 10, 1942 (aged 60); Oklahoma City
- Occupations: Attorney, Justice of the Oklahoma State Supreme Court
- Years active: 1911-1942

Thomas G. Andrews (1882–1942) was a notable jurist and a justice of the Oklahoma Supreme Court.

== Biography ==
Andrews, a native of Orangeburg, South Carolina, also known as Thomas Galpin Andrews, was born to John D. Andrews and Belle (née Darby) Andrews on August 29, 1882. In 1904, he married Adelphia Wohlgematt, who died in 1928.

Andrews became a lawyer and moved to Oklahoma in 1911. (Note: No source has indicated that Andrews had any formal law school training. Presumably, he qualified for the bar by reading law, a rather common practice, especially in the United States at that time.) He served as city attorney in Stroud, Oklahoma, where he resided from 1911 to 1918. (Note: Thomas Galpin Andrews was still listed as a member of a legal society (Phi Delta Phi) in Lincoln, Nebraska for 1912.)

In 1919 he moved to Chandler, where he was city attorney and also Lincoln County, Oklahoma attorney from 1922 to 1929. He served as a justice of the Oklahoma state supreme court (1925-1935). Harlow's 1930 book lists him under Lincoln County at that time.

He married Reba Myers in 1930.

Thomas died at his home in Oklahoma City on September 10, 1942.

Andrews belonged to the Disciples of Christ church. He also was a member of the American Bar Association; Phi Delta Phi; Freemasons; Knights Templar; Shriners; Odd Fellows and Lions.
