= Charles W. Mason =

American judge (1887–1969)

- Born: December 11, 1887; Stafford, Ohio
- Died: January 18, 1969 (aged 81); Nowata, Oklahoma
- Occupations: Attorney, U.S. military officer in WWI and WWII, Justice of the Oklahoma Supreme court (1923-1931)

Charles W. Mason (1887–1969) was a justice of the Oklahoma Supreme Court from 1923 to 1931, serving as Vice Chief Justice in 1927 and as chief justice from 1929 to 1931. Born in Stafford, Ohio, he was educated at Grant University (Note: Now named University of Tennessee at Chattanooga) (Chattanooga, Tennessee) and at Washington and Lee University. He and his parents settled in what is now Nowata, Oklahoma, which became his home for the rest of his life. He was admitted to the Oklahoma bar in June 1911. Mason also served in the U. S. military in both World War I and II. His final rank was colonel. He died in 1969.

== Early life ==
Charles W. Mason was born in Stafford, Ohio on December 11, 1887. He was the son of Frank and Mary Luella (Shankland) Mason. Frank and Luella were still living on the farm of Frank's father, George Mason. Frank decided to move his family to Indian Territory in 1903, settling in the town of Nowata (now Nowata, Oklahoma).

After graduating from Grant University in Chattanooga Tennessee, Charles went on to study law at Washington and Lee University, before returning to Nowata. Admitted to the bar in 1911, he practiced law privately until he was appointed City Attorney for about a year. He ran for and was elected as Nowata County Attorney for a two-year term in 1914–1916. During World War I, he served in the U. S. Army Air Service as a balloon pilot and attaining the rank of captain. After leaving the army, he became the district judge for the Oklahoma 2nd District in 1919–1923.

Charles married Ruth Ethel Cobbs on December 24, 1914, in Nowata, Oklahoma.

Law Notes reported in 1919 that Charles W. Mason of Nowata had succeeded Judge J. W. Campbell as District Judge of the Rogers-Nowata District.

In 1923, Mason was appointed Associate Justice of the Oklahoma Supreme Court and District Judge for the Second Judicial District for the term 1923–1931. He was made Chief Justice for the 1929–1931 term.

Mason returned to the U.S. military in World War II, where he served in the Air Force as a command pilot and attained the rank of colonel.

== Death ==
In 2014, Sig Ep, the journal for Sigma Phi Epsilon fraternity members reported that Charles W. Mason had died on January 18, 1969. The obituary read:

World War I and World War II Veteran, Oklahoma Supreme Court Chief Justice and VA Epsilon Brother Colonel Charles W. Mason, U.S. Army died on this date. He was 81 years old. During WWI, Brother Mason served as a captain in the U.S. Army Air Service as a balloon pilot, and as a command pilot with the Air Corps during WWII.

Brother Mason graduated from Washington and Lee in 1911, serving as the Nowata County Attorney from 1914 to 1916, and after his service in World War I he was elected district judge of Oklahoma's 2nd District in 1919. Charles served as a district judge until he was elected to the Oklahoma State Supreme Court where he served, including two years as Chief Justice of the court from 1929 to 1931.

Respect can be paid to Brother Mason at Nowata Memorial Cemetery, Nowata, Oklahoma.

== Organizations ==
- 32°Mason;
- Shriners;
- Benevolent and Protective Order Elks (BPOE);
- Knights of Pythias;
- Rotary International (Nowata, Oklahoma), Oklahoma and Oklahoma City.
- Sigma Phi Epsilon;
- Delta Theta Phi;
- American Legion;
- Forty and Eight;
