= Lucien Greaves =

Co-founder and spokesperson for The Satanic Temple

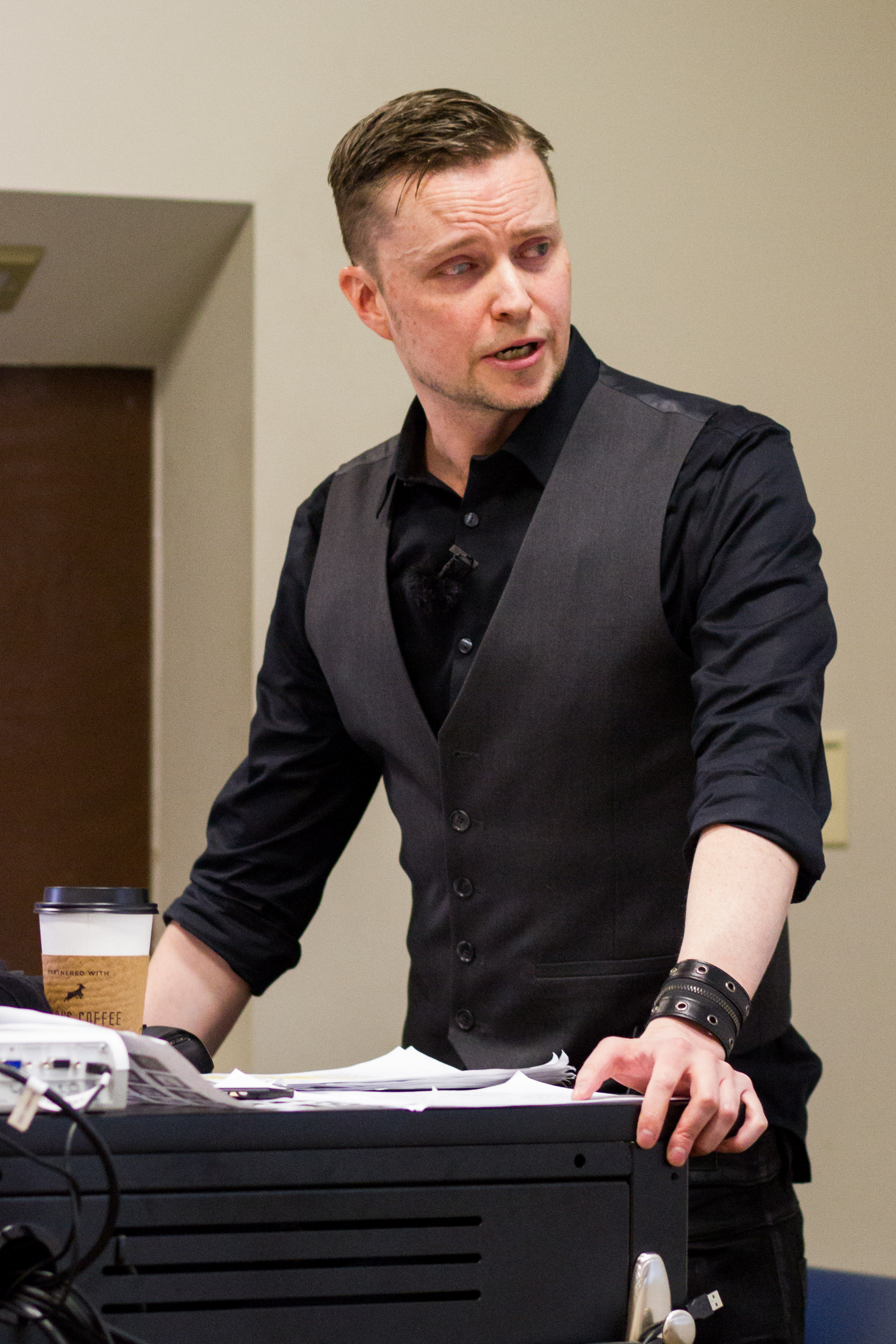
- Greaves in March 2016
- Born: Detroit, Michigan
- Other names: Douglas Mesner, Douglas Misicko
- Occupation: Social activist
- Website: luciengreaves.com

Douglas Mesner, better known as Lucien Greaves, is an American social activist, as well as the cofounder and spokesperson for The Satanic Temple.

== Early life ==
Greaves was born in Detroit, Michigan, United States. His mother was a Protestant who took him to Sunday School.

Greaves illustrated the 2003 reprint edition of the incendiary 1896 book Might Is Right. In a podcast promoting the new edition with publisher Shane Bugbee, Greaves made remarks some construed as antisemitic.

== Activism ==
Greaves has spoken on the topics of Satanism, secularism, and The Satanic Temple at universities throughout the United States, and he has been a featured speaker at national conferences hosted by American Atheists, the American Humanist Association, and the Secular Student Alliance.

Greaves has been instrumental in setting up the Protect Children Project, the After School Satan project, and several political demonstrations and legal actions designed to highlight social issues involving religious liberty and the separation of church and state.

Greaves has received many death threats, and deliberately does not use his legal name to avoid threats to his family.

Greaves and his colleagues envisioned The Satanic Temple as a "poison pill" in the Church/State debate: Satanists asserting their rights and privileges where religious agendas have imposed themselves upon public affairs, serving as a reminder that such privileges are for everybody, and can provide a religious agenda beyond the current narrow understanding. Neither Greaves nor members of The Satanic Temple claim to worship Satan; instead, their beliefs focus on personal sovereignty, independence, freedom of will, and they use Satan as a symbol or metaphor.

Greaves appears throughout the 2019 documentary film Hail Satan? regarding religious freedoms and early days of The Satanic Temple. Greaves contributed the foreword to The Little Book of Satanism (2022) by La Carmina as well as artwork for multiple endeavors by Shiva Honey.
