= Hail Satan? =

- Theatrical release poster
- Directed by: Penny Lane
- Produced by: Gabriel Sedgwick
- Starring: Lucien Greaves; Jex Blackmore; Satanic Temple members
- Cinematography: Naiti Gámez
- Edited by: Amy Foote; Aaron Wickenden
- Music by: Brian McOmber feat. Angel Deradoorian and Jordan Dykstra
- Production company: Hard Working Movies
- Distributed by: Magnolia Pictures
- Release dates: January 25, 2019 (Sundance); April 19, 2019 (United States)
- Running time: 95 minutes
- Country: United States
- Language: English
- Box office: $424,284

Hail Satan? is a 2019 American documentary film about the origins of The Satanic Temple, including the group's grassroots political activism. Directed by Penny Lane, the film premiered at the 2019 Sundance Film Festival, and was released in the United States on April 19, distributed by Magnolia Pictures. The film follows Satanists working to preserve the separation of church and state against the privileges of the Christian right.

== Summary ==
What started out as a religious non-theistic movement by members of what would become The Satanic Temple, founded by Lucien Greaves and Malcolm Jarry, to praise then Governor of Florida, Rick Scott, for his support of school prayer (Which was actually a publicity stunt and sarcastic attack on the Governor's hypocrisy), leads to the founding of the organization as an actual recognized religious group. Members organize a series of public actions advocating religious pluralism, with a broad focus on the Statue of Baphomet. The group campaigns to have it erected next to a Ten Commandments monument to raise awareness of how Christian privilege is discrimination, while also supporting the rights of Woman's Reproductive freedom and the LGBTQ community. With a mischievous sense of humor, a group of rebellious misunderstood outsiders committed to social justice and political egalitarianism empower thousands around the world.

== Production ==
Lane wanted to combat the widespread view of the Satanic panic of the 1970s through 1990s, during which Satanists were described as rapists and murderers, usually of children. She described the primary editing for the film occurred in approximately six months, "concurrent with the bulk of shooting," after a lengthy research and development phase.

Lane has said that she initially thought the Satanic Temple was conceived only as a prank, only to subsequently understand that they had actually "gone from being kind of a joke to being a real thing. [...] The notion of a religious movement being born out of a joke seemed like kind of a cool story, and not one I'd ever heard before." and adding that part of what compelled her to make the film was that she "loved the idea of watching a new religion get born, right before our eyes, and how goofy and weird that looks, especially if you're not part of it."

Satanic Temple co-founder and spokesperson Lucien Greaves was initially reluctant to allow the filmmakers access to the inner workings of the organization, saying "the decision to allow [director] Penny Lane behind the scenes access was not an easy one", and adding "it's very stressful having a couple of years of filming going on and having no idea what narrative is being constructed from that kind of footage. No matter how much you trust somebody you don't know ultimately what's going to be made of your life's work."

Lane has referred to the question of how the Satanic Temple differs from the Church of Satan as "a really interesting and complicated question", telling Birth Movies Death that "essentially, the Satanic Temple wouldn't exist without the Church of Satan. The Church of Satan codified the idea of Satanism in the first place", adding "But then you have a huge point of departure and a satanic Reformation moment where the Satanic Temple's beliefs are sufficiently different from the Church of Satan", and explaining that "it was very challenging to get that right because there's so much more to say about that 50-year history" than was possible in a single film.

== Reception ==
On the review aggregator Rotten Tomatoes, the film holds an approval rating of 96%, based on 131 reviews, with an average rating of 7.6/10. The website's critical consensus reads, "Hail Satan? challenges preconceived notions of its subject with a smart, witty, and overall entertaining dispatch from the front lines of the fight for social justice." On Metacritic, the film has a weighted average score of 76 out of 100, based on 31 critics, indicating "generally favorable" reviews.

The Observer's Guy Lodge listed the film in his 20 must-see documentaries to explain the world in 2020. Lodge wrote of it as a "puckish, perceptive, sometimes riotous documentary", "you won't see a more pointed inquiry into religious freedom at the moment – or a funnier one."

== See also ==
- After School Satan
- Christian dominionism
- Ten Commandments monument in Arkansas
- Ten Commandments monument in Oklahoma
