= Baphometic Bowl of Wisdom =

War memorial in Salem, Massachusetts, United States

Baphometic Bowl of Wisdom

The Baphometic Bowl of Wisdom is a memorial sculpture commissioned by The Satanic Temple, a somber 23-inch black cube inscribed with inverted pentagrams beneath an upturned soldier's helmet. The memorial to fallen soldiers was a collaboration between sculptor Chris Andres and metalworker Adam Volpe.

== Background ==
After the city of Belle Plaine, Minnesota allowed a local veterans group to place a display of a soldier with a rifle kneeling beside a two-foot Christian cross at the city-owned Veterans Memorial Park, the Freedom From Religion Foundation threatened to take the city to court, and The Satanic Temple announced plans to install their own public monument at the park.

The cross memorial was removed in January 2017, but in response to protests and pressure to restore it, city officials designated a portion of the park as a limited public forum where any group, for a temporary period, could pay tribute to the fallen as they saw fit. Both the Belle Plaine Veterans Club and the Satanic Temple applied and were approved to erect monuments. In April 2017, the cross memorial was restored. The Satanic Temple planned to install its memorial in July 2017.

As the plan drew more protests, city officials decided to shut down the limited public forum, ordering the removal of the cross memorial and withdrawing permission for the Temple's monument. The Satanic Temple sued the city seeking $35,000 in damages, claiming violation of the group's First Amendment rights, and breach of contract for rescinding approval after they had already paid to have the marker built. The Satanic Temple lost the court battle with the city of Belle Plaine in 2021: the judge found that Temple had contracted an artist to make the monument before receiving a permit, and the Temple failed to make a "compelling case" that its reputation was hurt by the decision.
