= Shiva Honey =

American artist, author and musician

Minister of Satan Shiva Honey
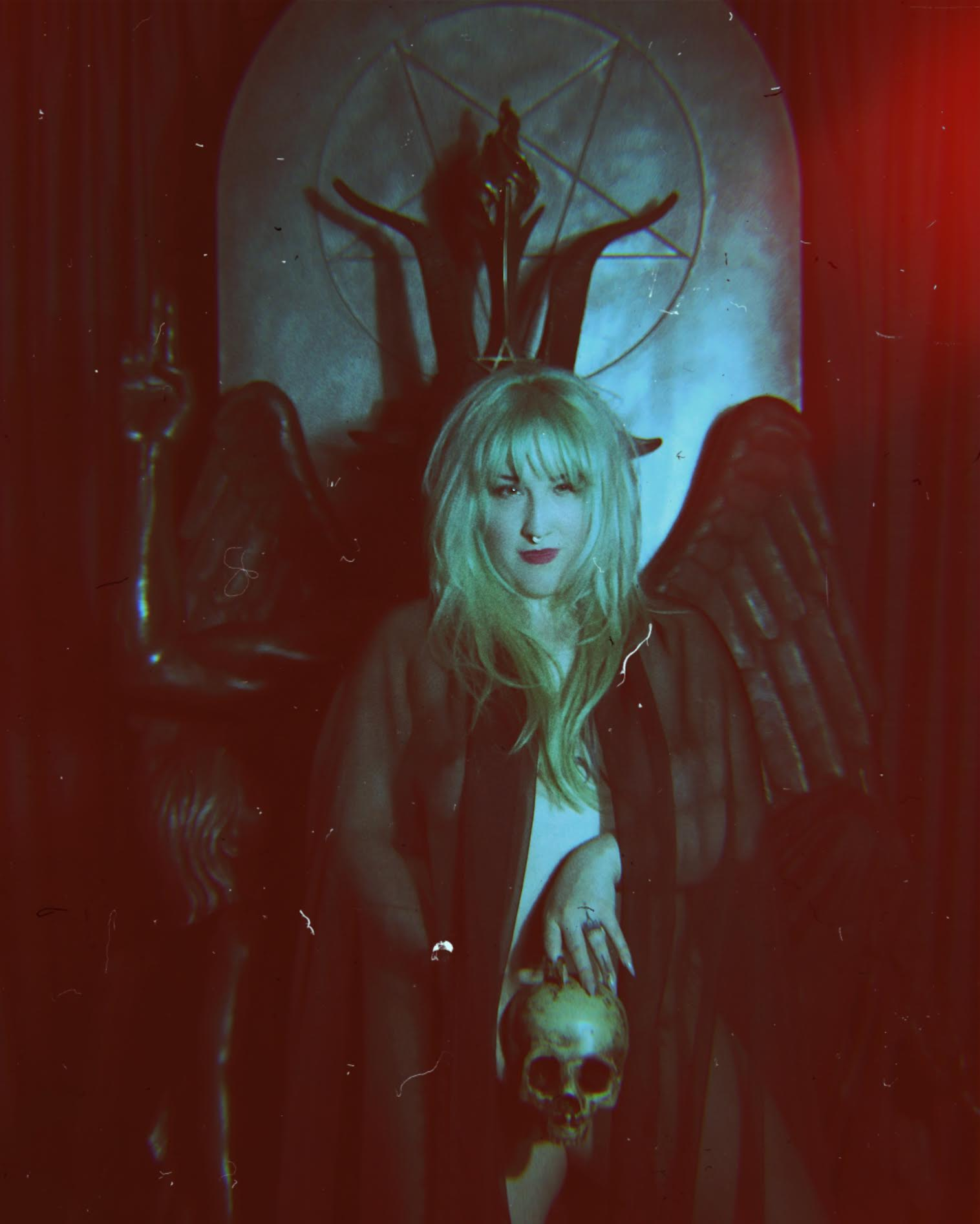
- Priestess Shiva Honey sitting with the Baphomet Statue at The Satanic Temple Salem
- Known for: Author, Clergy, Musician
- Movement: Satanic
- Website: https://www.serpentinae.com

Shiva Honey is a prominent figure within the modern Satanic movement, known as an artist, musician, organizer, and author. Shiva Honey has significantly contributed to the development of public rituals for The Satanic Temple (TST).

== Biography ==
Shiva Honey was a founding member of The Satanic Temple Detroit and The National Council (now International Council) of The Satanic Temple. Shiva has been instrumental in organizing major events and rituals for TST, including The unveiling of the Statue of Baphomet and Snaketivity display. Honey's contributions extend to the creation of ritual products for TST and her own line for Serpentīnae, emphasizing the importance of ritual in her Satanic practice.

As a musician, Shiva Honey has been involved in projects that aim to provide a "soundtrack for the sacred Satanic experience." Her band Serpentīnae is noted for its dark, moody, and occult sound. Honey has also collaborated with the experimental industrial band Satanic Planet: providing guest vocals on the tracks "Unbaptism" and "Exorcism" on Satanic Planet's debut album, and performing with the band at the Indiana Statehouse.

In 2021 Shiva won The Satanic Temple's Anatole France Award For Contemporary Satanic Literature for The Devil's Tome: A Book of Modern Satanic Ritual.

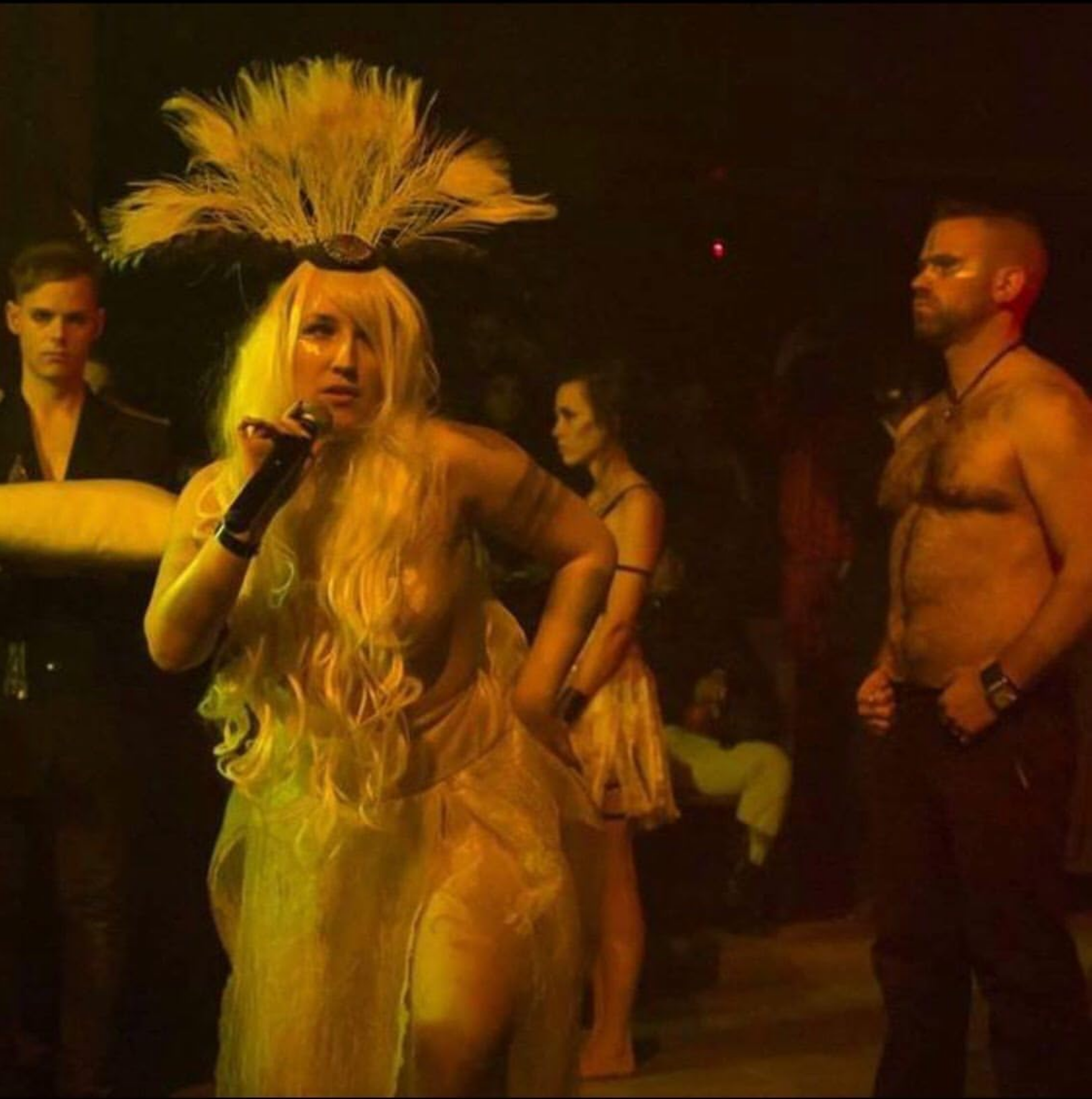
Shiva Honey performing Satanic ritual at the Detroit Masonic Temple for Theatre Bizarre

== Beliefs and practices ==
Shiva Honey's "Devil's Dinner Parties" have gained notoriety on multiple occasions.

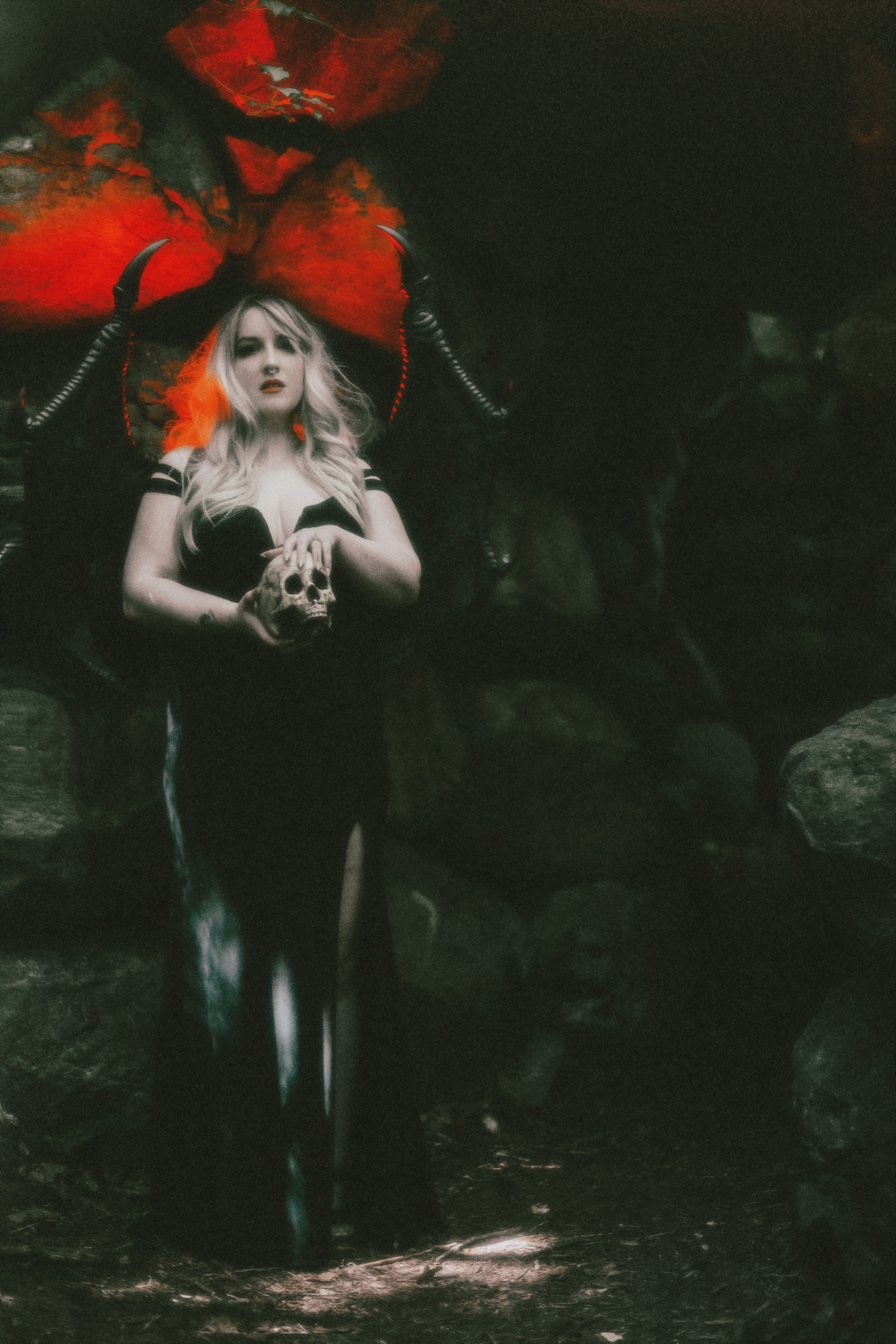
Priestess Shiva Honey in a photo for The Devil's Death: Your Satanic Companion for Grief and Dying

== Published works ==
Honey has authored several books that explore modern Satanic ritual; these works provide insights into her journey within Satanism, the scientific case for ritual, and perspectives on death and grieving from a Satanic viewpoint.

- The Devil's Tome: A Book of Modern Satanic Ritual - explores non-theistic practices as a means for healing, empowerment, and community building.
- The Devil's Deck: A Tool for Satanic Enlightenment
- The Devil's Death: Your Satanic Companion for Grief and Dying - offers a Satanic perspective on understanding death, dying, and grieving.
- Devotion: Ritual Music for Love, Loss, and Desire - a companion album to the healing rituals from The Devil's Tome.

These books have received mixed reviews within the community, with The Devil's Tome being particularly noted for its approach to modern Satanic ritual.

== In the media ==
Shiva Honey was a subject in "The Satanists Next Door" episode of This Is Life with Lisa Ling on CNN.

She appears in the documentary Hail Satan? directed by Penny Lane.
