= The Little Book of Satanism =

2022 book by La Carmina

The Little Book of Satanism: A Guide to Satanic History, Culture & Wisdom
- Author: La Carmina
- Language: English
- Subject: Religion
- Genre: Non-fiction
- Published: October 25, 2022
- Publisher: Simon & Schuster
- ISBN: 1646044223

The Little Book of Satanism: A Guide to Satanic History, Culture & Wisdom is a 2022 nonfiction book by author La Carmina about Satanism’s historical evolution and religious practices. The book includes a foreword by Lucien Greaves, the spokesperson and co-founder of The Satanic Temple.

== Contents ==
The book explores the history of Satanism and Satan-like figures of Babylonian and Canaanite myths, Zoroastrianism, and the Bible, including Satanic organizations pre-dating Anton LaVey and the Church of Satan (and how the Church of Satan differs ideologically from The Satanic Temple). Myths and media-propagated misconceptions are addressed and debunked.

It discusses topics of persecution, such as the Salem witch trials and the Satanic Panic, as well as QAnon and Pizzagate.

It also covers community activism within Satanic communities, such as LGBTQ and reproductive activism from The Satanic Temple.
