= Bagel head =

Temporary swelling distortion of the forehead

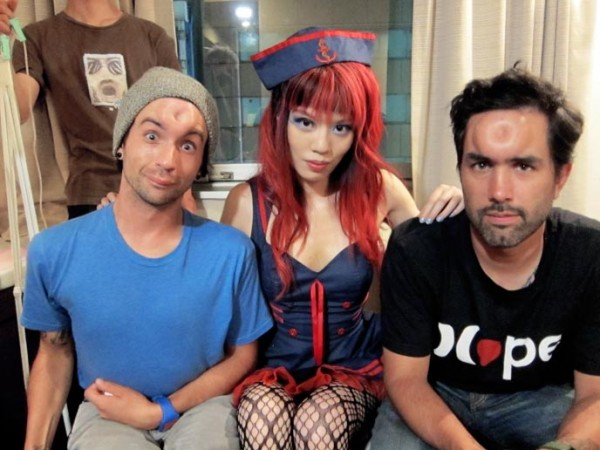
Television coordinator La Carmina between two bagel head recipients

Bagel head is a type of body modification pioneered in Canada. It is a temporary (6- to 24-hour) swelling distortion of the forehead created by a saline drip and often shaped to resemble a bagel or donut. In 2012, after appearing on a National Geographic TV special, this practice became the subject of sensationalism as news outlets worldwide misleadingly declared it a "Japan trend".

== Origins ==
The bagel head procedure was first done in Canada by Jerome Abramovitch in 1999 and was taken to Japan in 2007 by Keroppy Maeda. Since that time, he performs it approximately 10 times a year at special occasions such as underground fetish parties. The procedure involves the subject taking a 300–400 cc medical-grade saline injection to the mid-forehead over a period of two hours, which is then often given a depression in the center, leading to the "bagel head" name. According to Maeda, "The body absorbs it over time so by the next morning it just goes back to normal".

== Sensationalism ==
The procedure was documented in an episode of the National Geographic Channel's Taboo series, arranged and coordinated by TV fixing company La Carmina and the Pirates. Shortly after, the story was picked up by international media outlets, including HuffPost, CNN, and Mashable, in stories that spun the process off as a wacky new Japanese trend – when, in the words of La Carmina, "It is not a trend even among the most hardcore body modification types. It's expensive. It takes specialized equipment. Most Japanese people don't even know about it." The story's spread came as a surprise to Japanese media outlets, including Excite News, where one reporter declared, "Having never heard of 'bagel head' I was as surprised as anyone to see these pictures of young people. A perfectly cute forehead transformed by a grotesque swelling. It looks quite like a space alien. I shudder to think, but according to news sites all over, this is Japan's latest trend?" The overblown coverage has confused many Japanese – who had not previously seen or heard of the practice outside of international media.

== Safety concerns ==
Amidst the widespread media coverage were reports of potential health concerns regarding the process. Omar Ibrahimi, a dermatologist with experience performing saline injections during cosmetic procedures, states that using a saline solution that is too concentrated (hypertonic) could lead to extreme dehydration. Additionally, non-sterile saline solution could potentially lead to a bacterial or fungal infection. However, Maeda uses medical-grade saline in his practice. Ibrahimi was additionally concerned that repeated injections could lead to the forehead skin sagging, which Maeda says does not happen no matter how many times it is performed. The safety of this procedure was also discussed on an episode of The Doctors.
