= Jex Blackmore =

American pro-choice activist (born 1986)

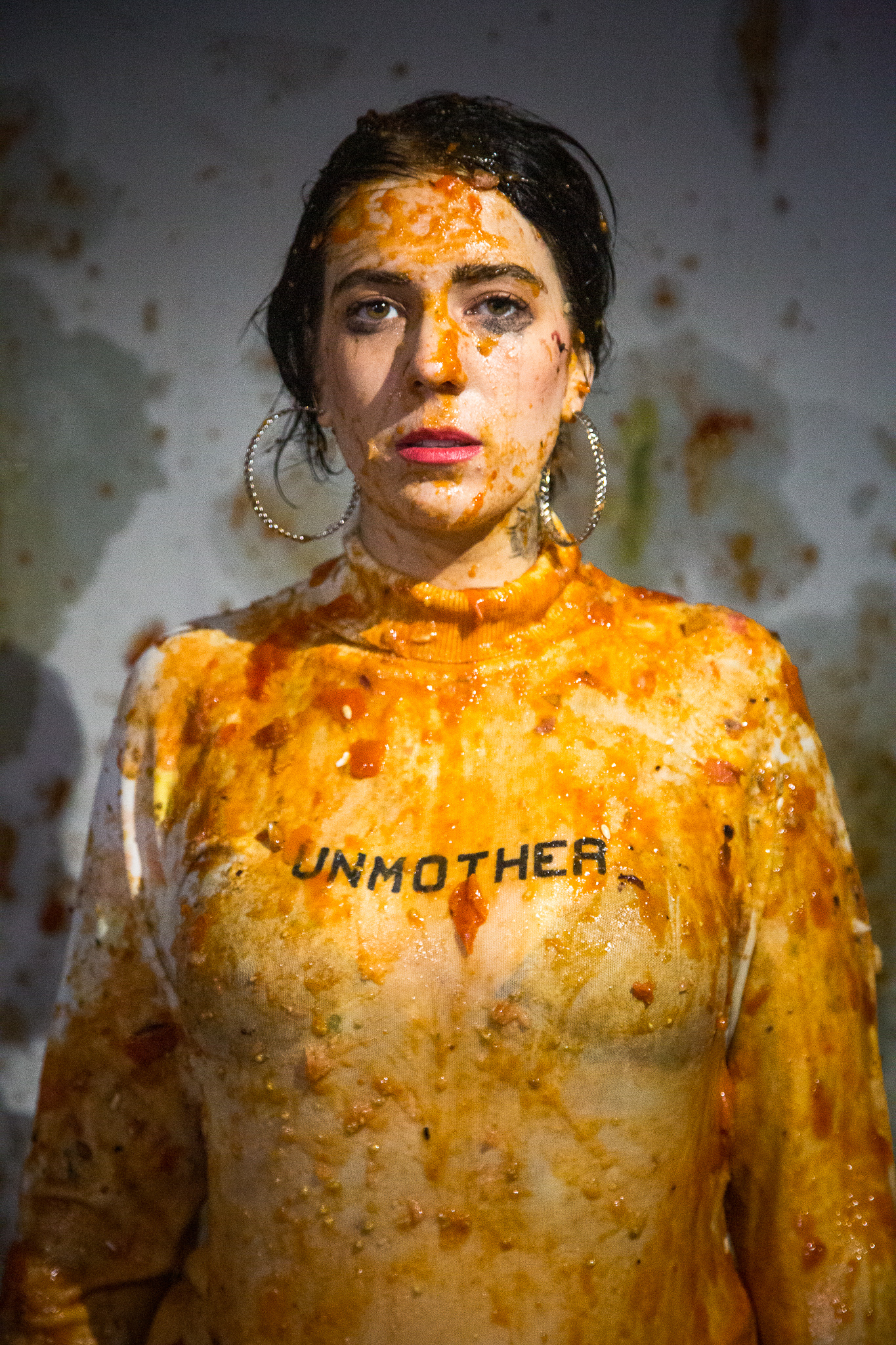
- Still from the performance One hundred pounds of rotten fruit while awaiting her second abortion, livestreamed by Blackmore, 2019
- Born: July 21, 1986 (age 40); Southfield, Michigan, U.S.
- Education: University of Michigan
- Occupations: Pro-choice activist, performance artist
- Organization: The Satanic Temple (2014–2018)
- Partner: Miko Hughes (2025-present)
- Children: 1
- Website: www.jexblackmore.com

Jex Blackmore (born July 21, 1986) is an American pro-choice activist, performance artist, and Satanist. Blackmore was affiliated with the Satanic Temple, a non-theistic organization, between 2014 and 2018, and led its Detroit chapter. Blackmore publicized their (Note: Blackmore uses the pronouns they/them.) three abortions through a detailed blogging project, a film performance, and by taking a medical abortion pill during an interview on local TV.

== Early life and education ==
Jex Blackmore was born in Southfield, Michigan, United States and is based in Detroit. Their father owned a funeral home and they read books about embalming and disease, which influenced their approach to the human body. Blackmore's mother was a theater director, and they themself recall being involved in theatre productions from a young age. They performed opera as a teenager, and began college studying music. In an interview with Lydia Lunch they shared that they left Detroit at nineteen and then spent time living in Montana, Boston, and Texas, "getting in a lot of trouble". Blackmore later returned to Michigan and graduated from the University of Michigan, having studied art history.

== Satanism ==
Blackmore was a member of the Satanic Temple (TST) and, in August 2014, founded a chapter in Detroit. Blackmore led the Detroit chapter, which set up a Satanic display on the grounds of the Michigan State Capitol in December 2014, alongside a conventional Christian nativity scene. Their "Snaketivity" display included an inverted pentagram and cross bearing the phrase "The Greatest Gift is Knowledge", alluding to the fall of man and the Genesis creation narrative of the snake and the tree of the knowledge of good and evil. In 2015, Blackmore organized the first public unveiling of the TST's statue of Baphomet, the "largest public satanic ceremony in history."

In August 2015, Blackmore and other TST activists responded to that year's anti-abortion National Day of Protest with a piece of political theatre: Two women knelt down, with their wrists tied, before an American flag with a depiction of Baphomet superimposed. Other TST members in clerical robes poured milk on the kneeling women, who "started gasping and sputtering as the cascade continued." In the Detroit version, Blackmore held up a sign, "America is not a theocracy. End forced motherhood."

As a TST spokesperson, Blackmore gave voice to a feminist approach to Satanism. Without explicitly naming the Church of Satan, they criticized Satanism as sexist, saying that "modern Satanism has been primarily associated with strength, masculinity and power. Reinforcing chauvinistic conceptions of the abilities of women, with a particular focus on male sexuality, modern Satanism has continued to emphasize traditional gender roles." Blackmore also spoke to the media, on behalf of TST, about its abortion rights lawsuit for a woman in Missouri. During this period, Blackmore designed actions that were not endorsed by the national TST. For example, they protested Texas abortion restrictions with a campaign to send semen in socks to the Governor. Scholars Kristin Marie Bivens and Kirsti Cole analyzed their effort as a grotesque protest, defined as using "the body's fluids to push back against attempts to legislate bodies."

In March 2018, Blackmore left TST after being removed by TST's National Council. The pivotal moment was their "Subversive Autonomous" performance, during which Blackmore made statements deemed incompatible with the group's non-violence policy, as shown in the documentary Hail Satan? Blackmore had stated, "We are going to storm press conferences, kidnap an executive, release snakes in the governor's mansion, execute the president." In a 2020 interview, they criticized TST as corrupt and stated, "The organization badly yearns to be deemed legitimate in the eyes of those in power but they will never achieve this aim, even if their litigious activities are successful. Our work, whatever it is, must come from a place of authenticity." That same year, Blackmore debated five members of the Westboro Baptist Church at a Central Michigan University class on media law. The student audience reportedly preferred Blackmore's Satanism to the Westboro Baptists' views.

== Abortion rights ==
In 2015, Blackmore wrote a series of detailed blog posts leading up to their abortion on November 26, Thanksgiving. Blackmore called it the Unmother Project and used it as an opportunity to oppose restrictions to abortion in Michigan, their home state. At the time, Blackmore was uninsured and they began their project only 12 days before the abortion.

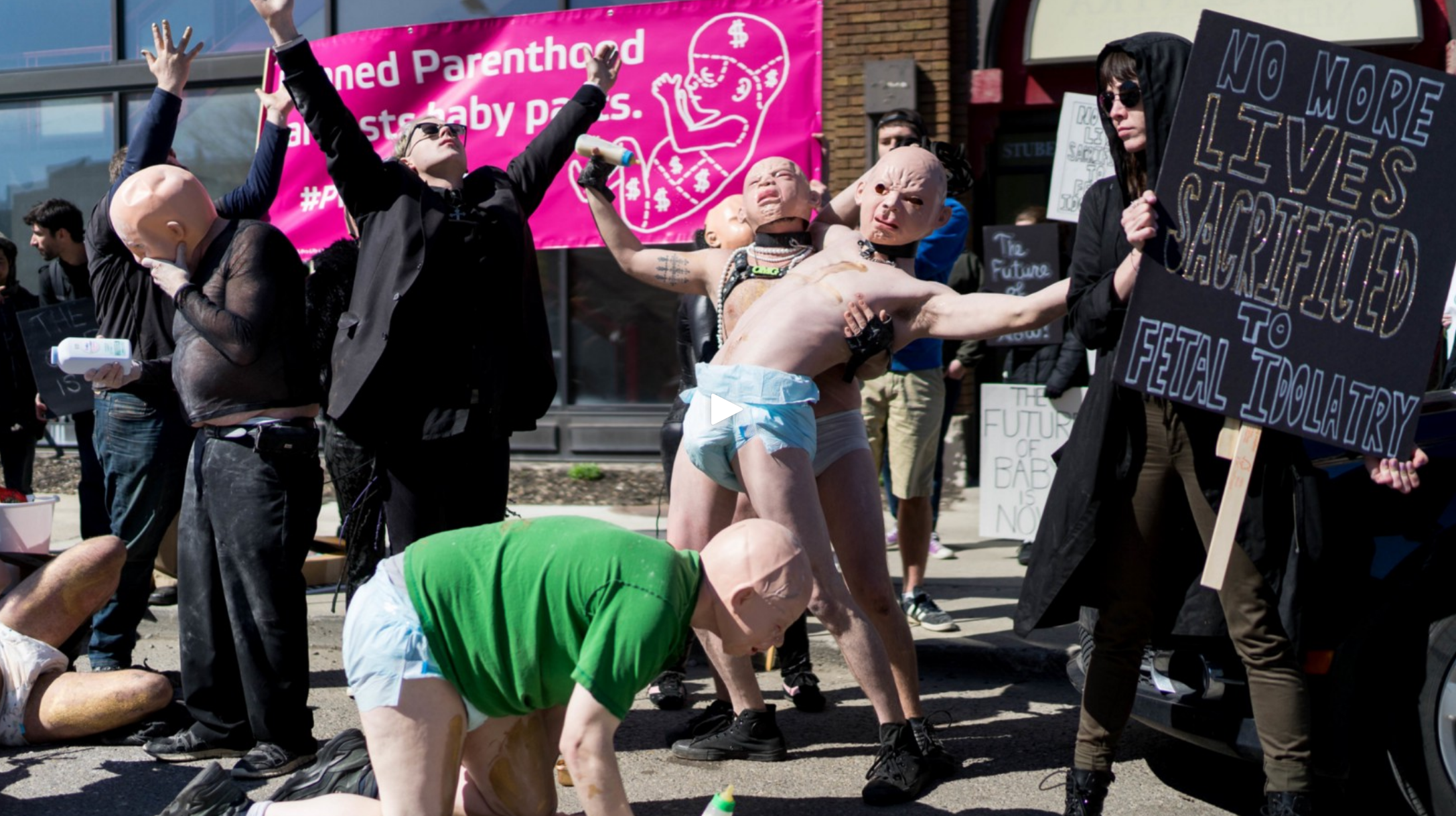
Future of Baby is Now performed by the Satanic Temple in Detroit, with poster: "No more lives sacrificed to fetal idolatry", April 25, 2016

Blackmore led the Detroit TST chapter on abortion rights counter-protests, including The Future of Baby is Now with "'fetish babies' – adults in baby masks, diapers, and BDSM gear." Before their second abortion, Blackmore livestreamed a performance, One hundred pounds of rotten fruit while awaiting her second abortion, in which they were pelted with one hundred pounds of rotten fruit. In a performance art journal, Emergency Index, Blackmore wrote,

As overripe pulp exploded painfully against my skin, I was reminded that my womb shared a resemblance of fruit deemed unnatural and spoiled. Each blow echoed the weight of violence championed by political powers that tell us our lives and dignity matter less than that of a fetus... The bruises that camouflaged my body from this performance remained visible until the day following my abortion, which left none.

Originally titled The Dignity of Every Human Life, the performance responded to the January 18, 2019, March for Life, whose livestream was projected onto Blackmore during their performance. In January 2022, Blackmore took abortion medication on live television, Fox affiliate WJBK in Detroit. Blackmore was in the process of explaining to the host, Charlie Langton, their view of the Food and Drug Administration's position on mailing medical abortion pills, mifepristone. Langton was surprised and an anti-abortion guest was visibly upset. The show was held on the 49th anniversary of Roe v. Wade. In an email to The Washington Post, Blackmore confirmed that this was their third medical abortion and their goal to overcome the "myths, misinformation, and stigma" over abortion pills.

In January 2022, Blackmore led a guerrilla information campaign in Detroit to tell women about the availability of medical abortion pills. The campaign centered around a poster designed by Blackmore and information on mail order pills, as an alternative to abortion clinics. While the campaign evoked some positive responses, Blackmore also stated that they were called a murderer and received death threats.

== Film and performance art ==
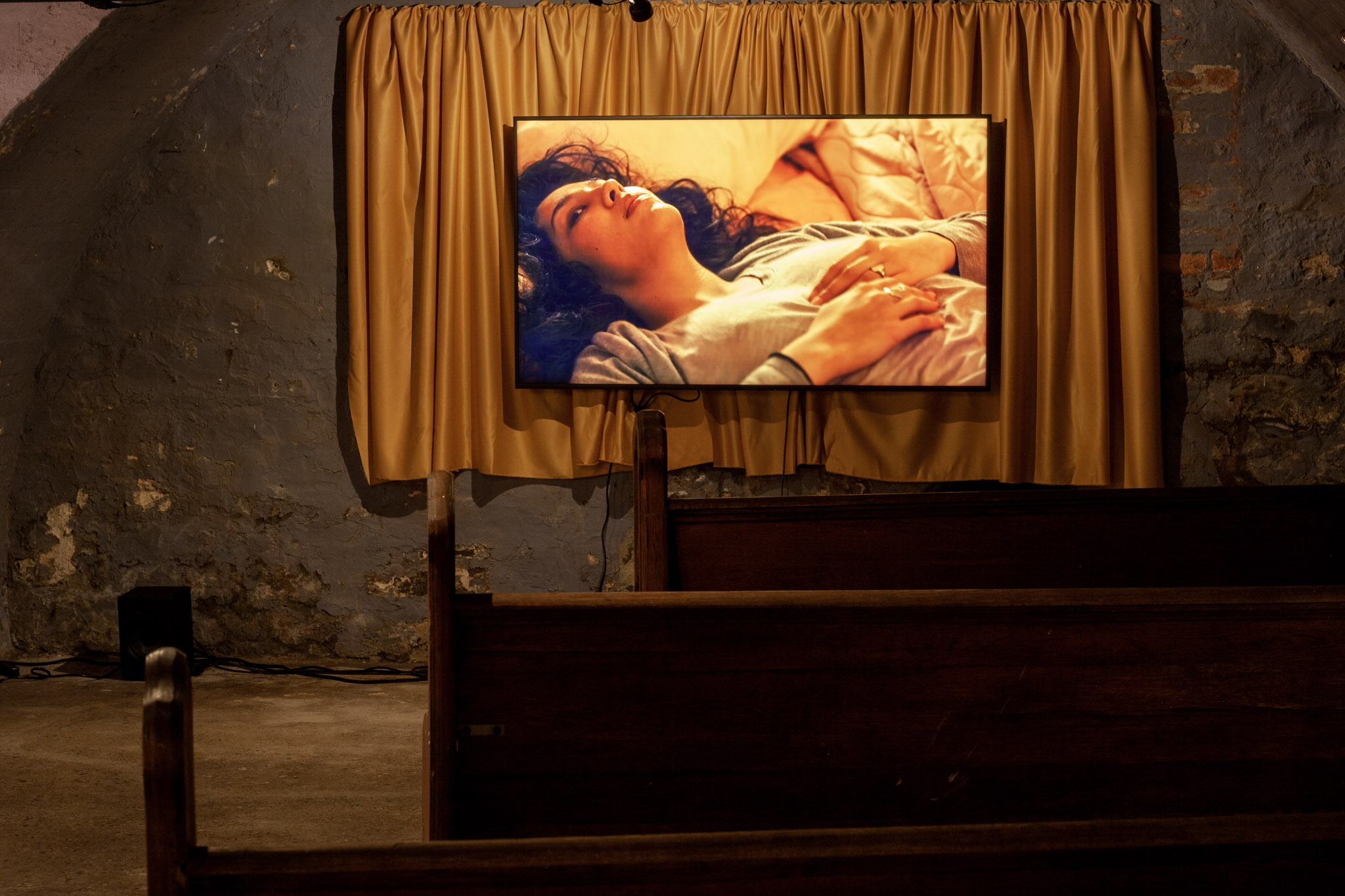
Installation of Undue Burden, a 24-hour endurance art performance by Blackmore

In February 2016, with the release of the film The Witch, Blackmore developed three interactive ritual performances in Austin, Hollywood, and New York City, titled the Sabbat cycle. The cycle refers to three phases of Satanism: Awaken, Rebel, and Convoke. During the Sabbat performance in Austin, Blackmore preached a "satanic jeremiad" (in the words of scholar Joseph P. Laycock) that warned of a Christian theocracy in America.

That same year, as a counter-demonstration to a Catholic-led anti-abortion protest in Ann Arbor, Michigan, Blackmore wore a crown of thorns and carried a large cross on her shoulder. The performance was titled, "Sanctions of the Cross" (contrasting the Stations of the Cross).

In 2019, Blackmore founded the Sex Militant collective and served as their spokesperson. Their two-day premiere, in Chicago, "constructed an immersive space out of durational performances, participatory rituals, sound, and protest art." The collective created events for sex workers, such as a gun training and a striptease fundraiser for a strippers' union. In September 2019, a Sex Militant exhibition aimed to give its Chicago audience a sense of the erotic in state-sponsored violence, using such elements as a spoken word performance, American flags, and "a glowing cross being pulled by performers in fetish play." It drew opposition from a nearby Catholic church.

Blackmore created another abortion rights artwork in 2020, in partnership with Ann Lewis, made of "wood, paint, one thousand metal hangers sent to artists by donation." The piece was titled C.R.I.S.I.S. (Constricting reproductive rights is state imposed suffering).

In March 2021, the Ann Arbor Film Festival showed their film, An Undue Burden, described as "an endurance work that follows the experience of a pregnant woman as she awaits her abortion procedure in a hotel room over the course of twenty-four hours."

== Personal life ==
In interviews from 2014 through 2022, Blackmore mentioned their affinity for Black Sabbath, their cat named for a goat in The Witch, and their shift away from Christianity as a teenager. They also enjoy motorcycles. They had a blog about radical politics activists, Raw Pussy, before joining the Satanic Temple. Blackmore also expressed concern about threats of violence against their performances.
