= After School Satan =

US non-Christian after school program

- Formation: July 2016; 10 years ago
- Headquarters: Salem, Massachusetts
- Spokesperson: Lucien Greaves
- Website: Official website

After School Satan is an after school program of The Satanic Temple (TST), a non-theistic United States organization based in Salem, Massachusetts, and is sponsored by Reason Alliance LTD, a 501(c)(3) non-profit organization. It was created as an alternative to Christian-based after-school groups, specifically at schools that host the Child Evangelism Fellowship's Good News Club. TST only starts a club when it is requested by a parent at a school where the Good News Club or similar organization is operating.

"We're like vampires," said June Everett, After School Satan Club Campaign Director. "We only go where we're invited." The program neither teaches about Satanism nor attempts to convert club-goers; it instead teaches about rationalism and scientific discovery. It is against the beliefs of The Satanic Temple to teach religious practice in schools. The Satanic Temple rejects supernatural beliefs and views Satan as a literary symbol of rebellion against authority, not as a supernatural entity.

== History ==
In 2016, TST announced it was pursuing After School Satan Clubs in select cities where TST had congregations, including Atlanta, Los Angeles, Pensacola, Tucson, Tacoma, Portland, Washington, D.C., Springfield, Missouri; and Taylorsville, Utah. Eventually, three clubs were formed, in Tacoma, Portland, and Taylorsville. According to Lilith Starr, founder of TST's Seattle chapter, the clubs struggled with funding issues and with finding volunteers. By the fall of 2017, former ASSC Campaign Director Chalice Blythe confirmed in an interview there were no active clubs.

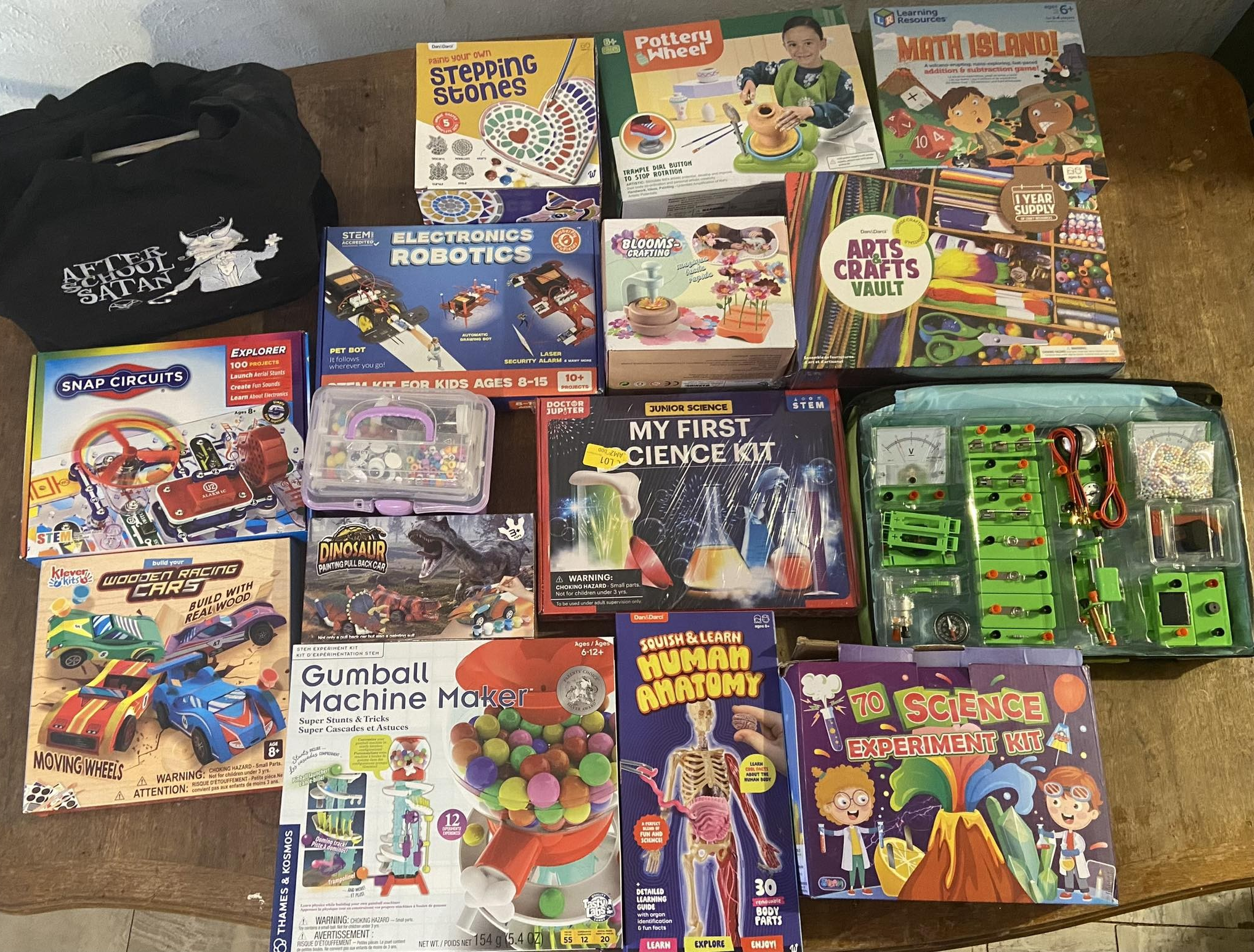
Supplies used by children attending the Moline, Illinois, After School Satan Club.

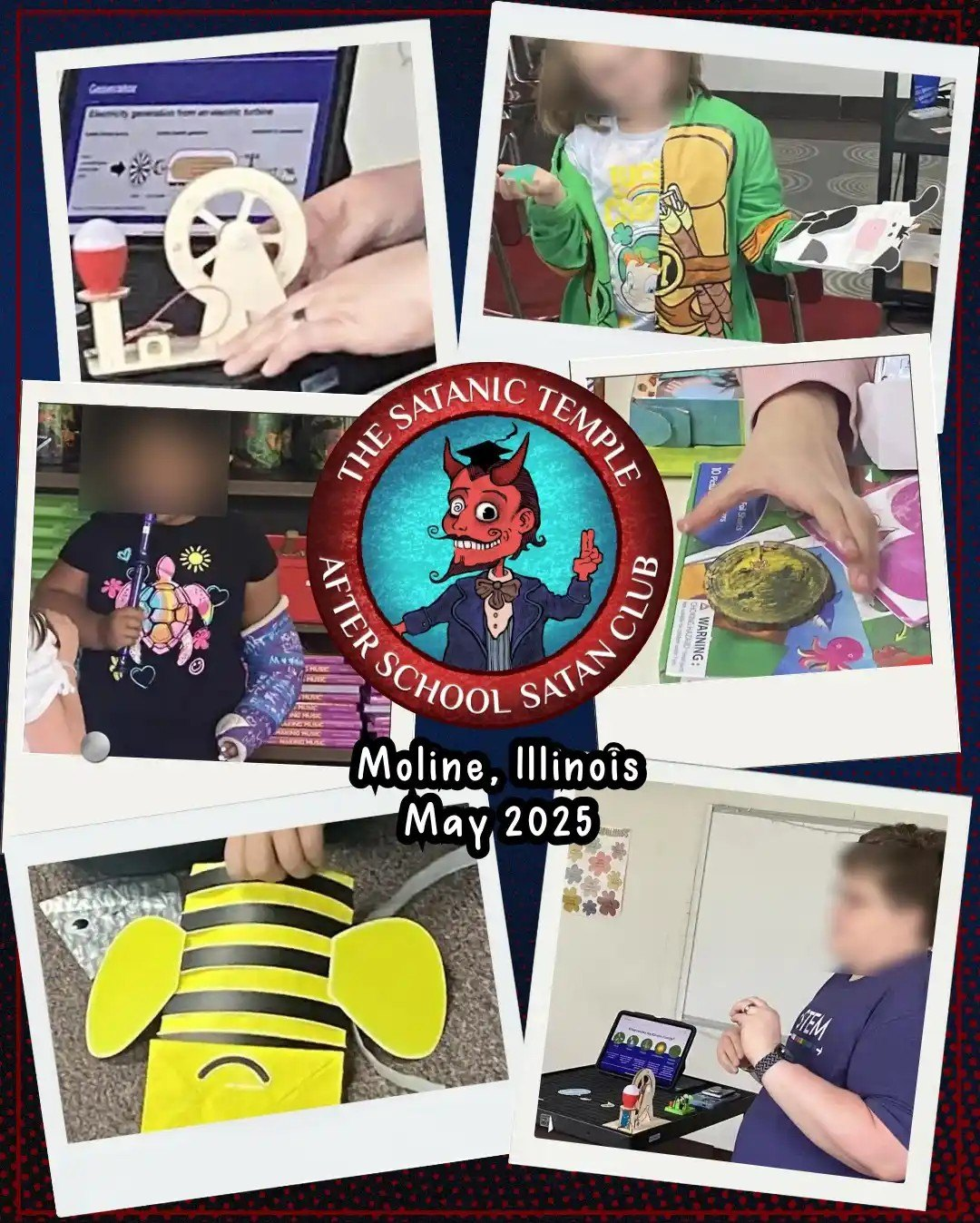
Activities during a meeting of the After School Satan Club in Moline, Illinois, which featured an interactive electricity demonstration, chemistry experiments, and crafting animal puppets.

In January 2022, ASSC began anew with the launching of three clubs, starting with one in Moline, Illinois. After meeting for two school years, the club received pushback from the Moline-Coal Valley Board of Education, which attempted to move the group off campus while allowing the Good News Club to remain. After four months of negotiations, it was agreed that the ASSC would stay on the elementary school campus where it had held its previous meetings. The club ran for five years, with a focus on science experiments, arts and crafts projects, and learning games. The Moline club was originally designed for elementary school children, but as those students began bringing their younger and older siblings, club leaders adapted and offered age-appropriate activities to all the attendees, who ranged in age from pre-Kindergarten to high school. The club reported having an enrollment of 23 children in its final year.

Blythe explained that during the initial running of the clubs during the 2016–17 school year, "After School Satan Club curriculum was only offered in school districts where local chapters of The Satanic Temple could manage and maintain them." With the 2022 relaunching, clubs were no longer overseen by TST congregation leaders, but by school parents.

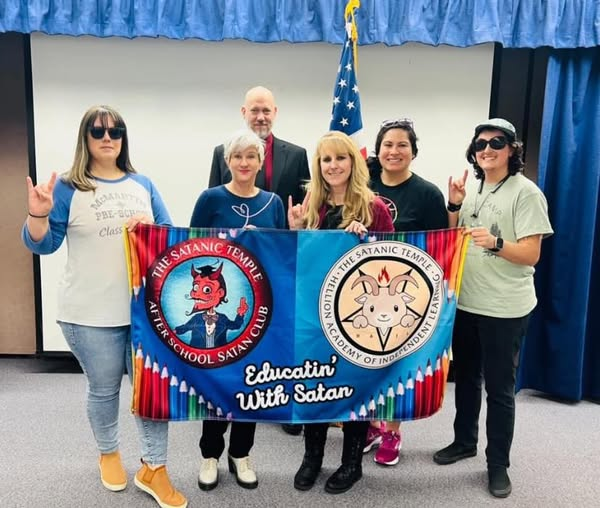
Volunteers with the San Clemente, California, After School Satan Club celebrate the club's opening day in February 2024.

Besides Moline, clubs were operated in Ojai, California, Lebanon, Connecticut., Tehachapi, California; Cordova, Tennessee; San Clemente, California; Hellertown, Pennsylvania; Delta County, Colorado; Endwell, New York; Wilmington, Ohio; Eaton, Ohio; Chesapeake, Virginia; and Lebanon, Ohio. Some school districts have chosen to stop renting to any outside groups as a result of ASSC's request to use its facilities. As of the 2026-27 school year, there are no ASSCs in operation.

During the 2022 relaunch, besides clubs in Moline, Eaton, and Lebanon, Ohio, TST attempted to start a club in Dillsburg, Pennsylvania. The Northern York School Board denied this request during a contentious board meeting, ostensibly because the Christian club that operated through a district elementary school met off campus during school hours, not on campus after dismissal, which ASSC wished to do. TST responded in the fall of 2022 by opening the Hellion Academy of Independent Learning (HAIL). It was identical to the ASSC except that it met off-site during school hours. Besides Dillsburg, TST hosted a HAIL group in Bristol, Tennessee and Marysville, Ohio. TST also supported student-run High School Satan Clubs (HSSC) in Las Vegas, Nevada, Michigan City, Indiana, and Olathe, Kansas.

In 2024, The Satanic Temple began partnering with the Secular Student Alliance, an organization that promotes secular values among students, and which has lent its support to After School Satan Clubs.

== Activities ==
Most club meetings feature a guest presenter who gives an interactive lesson in their area of expertise. Presenters have included artisans, authors, bakers, biologists, electricians, geologists, journalists, musicians, painters, social workers, and zoologists.

Besides the interactive lesson, children choose a science experiment or art project to complete. Science projects have included making operational miniature windmills, creating artificial snow, completing electronic circuits, and planting and watering seeds to see how they grow throughout the year. Sample art projects have included assembling a snow globe, making a birdhouse, fashioning an animal puppet, and painting friendship rocks.

During the summer session, clubgoers meet at an area business or non-profit for such activities as pottery making, stargazing, and playing board games with nursing home residents.

== One-time events ==
Besides hosting meetings during the school year and at summer sessions, ASSC has held sporadic one-time events. These have included: A back-to-school night in Lancaster, California; a back-to-school night and fundraiser in Dillsburg, Pennsylvania; and a family movie night in Lynchburg, Virginia.

== Legal issues ==
In February 2023, TST and the Virginia ACLU reached an agreement with Chesapeake Public Schools that required the district to permit an After School Satan Club to meet at B.M. Williams Primary School. The agreement forbade the school district from charging the club security fees not charged to other organizations, mandated the refund of illegally imposed charges, and required board policy be revised to ensure that all requesting organizations were treated equally.

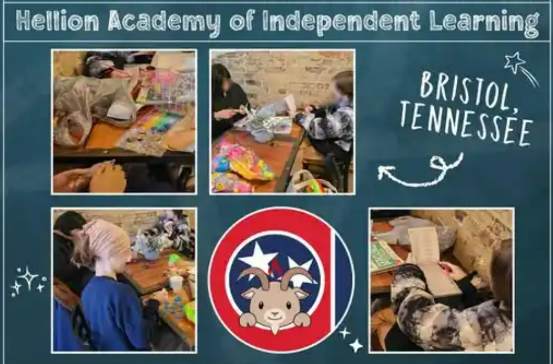
Students with the Hellion Academy of Independent Learning in Bristol, Tennessee, make friendship bracelets and read about bearded dragons during a club meeting.

In November 2023, The Satanic Temple reached a settlement with the Saucon Valley School District in Hellertown, Pennsylvania, after district officials forbade the ASSC from meeting on school grounds. The settlement came half a year after a federal court ordered the school district to allow the ASSC to hold meetings at the Saucon Valley Middle School and required the district to pay $200,000 in attorney's fees.

In July 2024, The Satanic Temple and the Freedom From Religion Foundation reached a settlement with Memphis-Shelby County Schools to recoup more than $15,000 in fees that had been charged to ASSC and to no other club. The agreement also required the district to provide ASSC with equal access and treatment, and to hold no further press conferences about the club.

== Supreme Court ruling ==
The 2001 Supreme Court decision Good News Club v. Milford Central School held that when a government operates a limited public forum it may not discriminate against speech that takes place in that forum. The limited public forum in this case referred to after school programs that take place on school grounds but are not run by the school district.

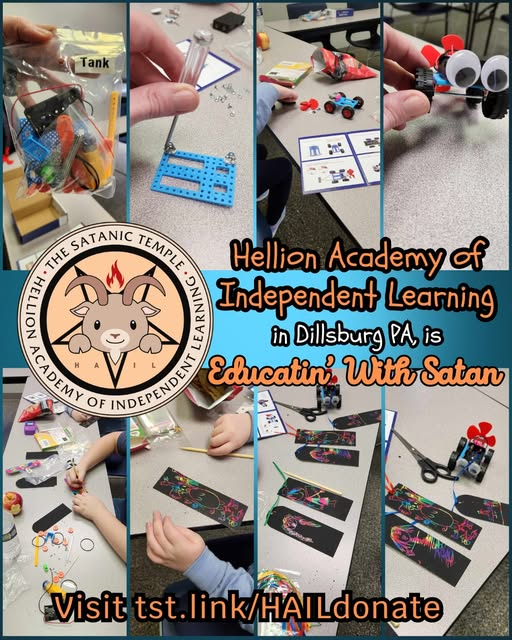
Students with the Hellion Academy of Independent Learning in Dillsburg, Pennsylvania, assemble miniature electronics and make bookmarks during a group meeting.

After School Satan was created by The Satanic Temple in July 2016 to ensure that equal representation for all religions is upheld in public schools and that religious freedom and plurality is respected. Since the 2001 ruling, the CEF has established thousands of Good News Clubs. In response, The Satanic Temple began a campaign to establish its own clubs across the United States. According to one organizer, "Whenever religion enters the public sphere, like the Good News Club at public schools, we take action to ensure that more than one religious voice is represented, and that is our intent with the After School Satan Club."

== Club philosophy ==
The clubs strive to provide students with the critical thinking skills necessary to be able to make important life decisions for themselves. They emphasize a scientific and rationalist, non-superstitious world view, and oppose indoctrination into other-worldly belief systems.

According to The Satanic Temple and After School Satan's co-founder and spokesperson, Lucien Greaves, "It’s critical that children understand that there are multiple perspectives on all issues, and that they have a choice in how they think. Satan is just a metaphorical construct intended to represent the rejection of all forms of tyranny over the human mind. We are only doing this because Good News Clubs have created a need for this. If Good News Clubs would operate in churches rather than public schools, that need would disappear. But our point is that if you let one religion into the public schools you have to let others, otherwise it’s an establishment of religion."

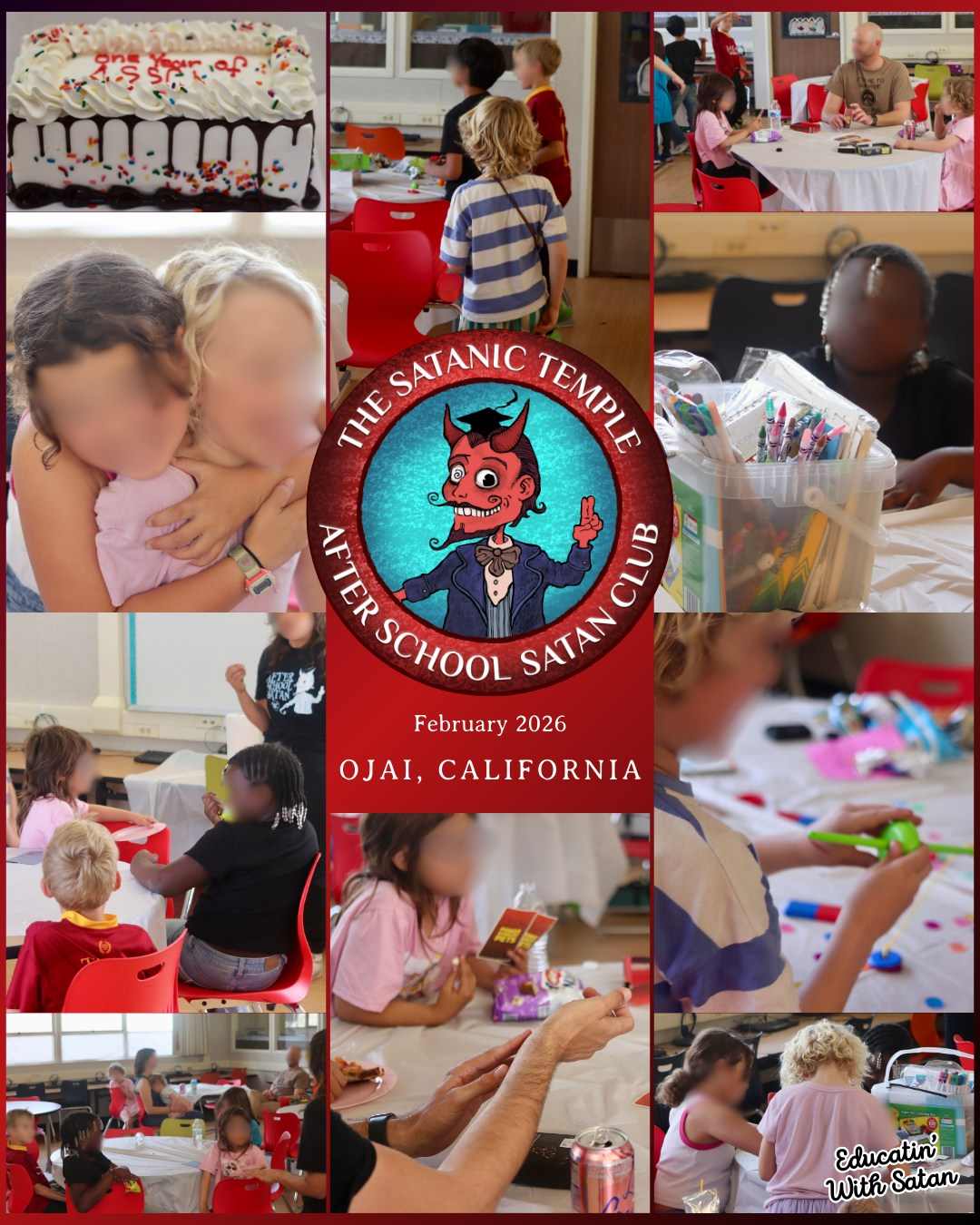
Students with the Ojai, California, After School Satan Club contribute to an eclectic meeting consisting of drawing, Legos, planting seeds, and learning the Dewey Decimal System.

After School Satan Clubs "incorporate games, projects, and thinking exercises that help children understand how we know what we know about our world and our universe." Satanic Temple spokesman Finn Rezz said the club focuses "on science and rational thinking," promoting "benevolence and empathy for everybody" – while providing an alternative voice to the Bible-centered Good News Club. After School Satan Clubs do not teach children to believe in a supernatural being named Satan or perform Satanic rituals.

== CEF response ==
The Child Evangelism Fellowship supports ASSC's right to equal access.

A December 2022 press release from CEF read, "While we have concerns about the way The Satanic Temple goes about its ASSC and do not agree with its ideology, we support access to all groups with genuine beliefs. Parents and guardians should be allowed to choose any club that they would prefer for their child to attend. CEF Communications Representative Lydia Kaiser elaborated, saying, "Restricting any optional club is a loss to First Amendment liberties and penalizes children who need wholesome, extra-curricular activities. CEF encourages school boards to not be intimidated, to not restrict clubs, and to let parents decide what their children attend."

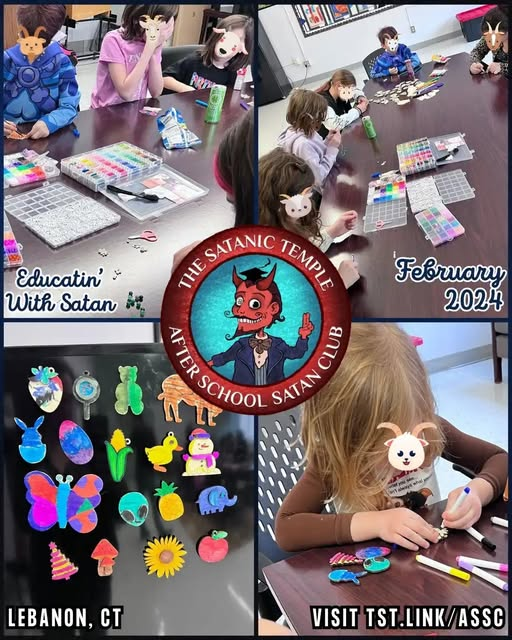
Children make colorful crafts during an After School Satan Club meeting in Lebanon, Connecticut.

== See also ==
- Freedom From Religion Foundation
- Separation of Church and State
- Proselytizing
