= La Carmina =

Canadian blogger and author

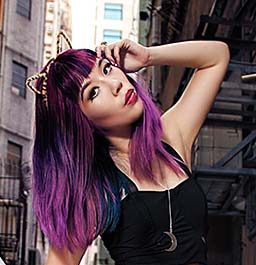
- La Carmina in 2015 with purple hair, a black top, cat-ear headband, and necklace with a moon pendant
- Born: Carmen Wong; Vancouver, British Columbia, Canada
- Education: Columbia University (BA); Yale Law School (JD)
- Occupations: Author, journalist, writer, blogger, TV host
- Website: www.lacarmina.com

Carmen Wong, better known as La Carmina is a Canadian blogger, author, journalist, and TV host. She specializes in Goth and Harajuku fashion and Japanese popular culture. Qantas called her "one of the best-known names in the blogging world, having authored three books and hosting travel segments for international television networks." She also appeared in one of the segments on the Tokyo episode of Bizarre Foods on Travel Channel.

== Early years ==
La Carmina was born and raised in Vancouver, British Columbia, Canada. Her parents are from Hong Kong. She attended Columbia University and then proceeded to Yale Law School, graduating with a JD.

== Career ==
=== Fashion and travel blogging ===
In September 2007, she began her La Carmina blog about alternative and Gothic fashion, travel and subcultures in Japan and worldwide. She is a professional blogger, and her blog has been quoted in Boing Boing, Women's Wear Daily, and the New York Times. It won Auxiliary Magazine's Best Blog of 2016 award.

She is a writer for publications including The New York Times, National Geographic, Travel + Leisure, Time Magazine, and Business Insider, Previously, she was a journalist for CNNGo, where she contributed articles about Asian pop culture, and also wrote for AOL/Huffington Post Travel, Fodor's Travel, Roadtrippers, as well as The Sunday Times and Hong Kong Express Magazine. In 2020, she won a Lowell Thomas travel journalism award from the Society of American Travel Writers.

She was selected as one of the world's top fashion bloggers to attend Luisa Via Roma's Firenze4Ever 2011 and 2012 events in Italy. She has given speeches at IFB Conference at New York Fashion Week, Social Media Week in Hong Kong, PRSA Travel & Tourism Conference, and PechaKucha Tokyo. In 2020, she gave the first TEDx talk about goths. In 2016, she was invited to the World Tourism Forum in Istanbul as one of the top travel influencers.

=== Television ===
La Carmina appeared in one of several segments on the Tokyo episode of Bizarre Foods, in which she and her friends dined with host Andrew Zimmern in a theme restaurant. According to Zimmern, the footage showcased the "exotic alternative lifestyles" of Tokyo and was originally intended for an episode of Bizarre World, but was later edited for inclusion in a Bizarre Foods episode instead, a process which refocused the segment onto the restaurant itself rather than the diners.

La Carmina's work as a travel and pop culture TV host on international networks includes Norway TV, CNNGo TV and a Canal+ France documentary about Japanese subcultures alongside Antoine de Caunes. Among her other hosting work includes shows for Food Network and Discovery Channel. She filmed with Discovery TV's Oddities, and did press trips to Maui, Berlin, Leipzig, and Prague to make travel videos. She has also hosted travel videos for the Mexico Tourism Board In 2011, she hosted, scripted, arranged, and field produced the show Coolhunting Weird Wisconsin for Huffington Post Travel TV. In the first episode, she gave a tour of Dodgeville theme hotel The Don Q Inn.

Japanese broadcaster NHK filmed a 20-minute documentary about her work in blogging and cooking. She was also the subject of an episode of NHK Kawaii TV.

She has been interviewed about Japanese and American theme cafes by ABC Nightline.

She has a travel video series published by Business Insider. Locations include Maldives, Israel, Bangkok, Mexico, Abu Dhabi, and more.

Alongside Henry Winkler and William Shatner, she appeared on an episode of NBC's Better Late Than Never.

==== La Carmina and the Pirates ====
La Carmina has a coolhunting, TV production, and promotion company that provides film fixing services to broadcasters worldwide. She was interviewed and featured in the Spanish book Coolhunting Digital.

La Carmina and the Pirates did the legwork for National Geographic Channel's Taboo episode documenting the body modification known as the bagel head – which she also hosted. She also hosted, translated, and arranged a show in Tokyo for National Geographic and Fuel TV. She appeared on CBS' The Doctors to speak about extreme body mods.

=== Books ===
In 2009, Perigee (a division of Penguin Books) published La Carmina's Cute Yummy Time, a cookbook based on Japanese "charaben" ("character bento"), a style of bento in which food is decorated to resemble animals, cartoon characters, and other such figures. She took all the photos and drew illustrations for the book. La Carmina's promotional tour included book signings in US cities and an appearance on The Today Show. The Guardian named Cute Yummy Time as one of the oddest book titles of the year, and the Washington Post recommended it in Gift Guide. Sarah DiGregorio of The Village Voice's "Fork in the Road" food blog wrote of Cute Yummy Time that "this kind of cute food (or kawaii food) seems less about eating and more about, well, looking cute and feminine while cutting food into elaborate shapes and not eating".

Mark Batty Publisher released Crazy, Wacky Theme Restaurants: Tokyo in 2009, a hardcover book with full color photos. In a review, The Vancouver Sun wrote, "Think of it less as a guidebook and more as a ghost train ride where whimsical, madcap and absurd images of some 30 theme restaurants materialize at every turn [...] Her tales flow effortlessly, with erudite explanations of what she sees in Tokyo's many subcultures [...] Brace yourself for a kitsch fix."

Released on October 25, 2022, she has written The Little Book of Satanism, published by Ulysses Press and Simon & Schuster. It is said to "[examine] the history and culture of Satanism, including “lurid conspiracy theories about serial killers and ritual abuse", and showing "why many Satanists today stand up for free inquiry and personal liberty,” according to the publisher. According to Fodor's, "With the open-minded curiosity of any good traveler, La Carmina explores the history, culture, and practices of greatly misunderstood modern-day Satanists [...] the little volume packs a mighty punch, examining Satan’s mighty and often affirmative influence throughout the ages and across the world."

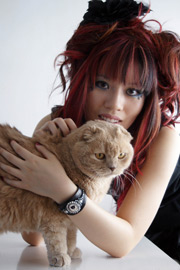
La Carmina with her Scottish Fold cat, Basil Farrow

== Personal life ==
Part of La Carmina's branding includes incorporating her Scottish Fold cat, Basil Farrow, into her promotion and media appearances.

== Works ==
- Crazy, Wacky Theme Restaurants: Tokyo (2009) ISBN 0-9820754-1-3
- Cute Yummy Time (2009) ISBN 0-399-53532-2
- The Little Book of Satanism (2022) ISBN 1646044223
