= Secular Student Alliance =

American nonprofit organization

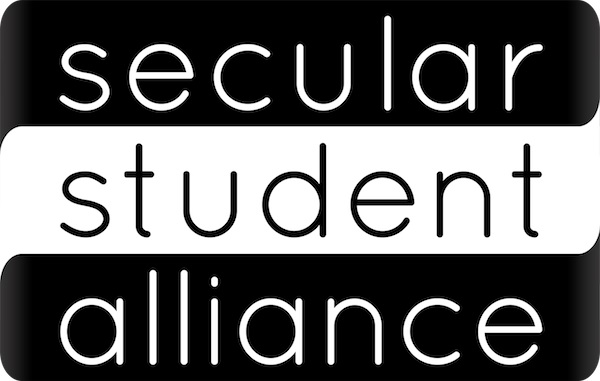
- Abbreviation: SSA
- Formation: November 21, 2001
- Type: non-profit
- Purpose: Secular humanism and Nontheism, as well as scientific rationality, secularism, and human-based ethics
- Headquarters: Los Angeles, California
- Region served: United States
- Key people: Kevin Bolling, executive director Evan Clark, chair of the Board of Directors
- Staff: 4
- Website: secularstudents.org

The Secular Student Alliance (SSA) is an American educational nonprofit organization whose purpose is to educate high school and college students about the value of scientific reason and the intellectual basis of secularism in its atheistic and humanistic manifestations. The SSA also offers these students and their organizations a variety of resources, including leadership training and support, guest speakers, discounted literature and conference tickets, and online articles and opinions. Starting in 2024, Secular Student Alliance partnered with The Satanic Temple, another organization promoting secular values among students, in supporting After School Satan clubs in public schools which also host religious student clubs.

== History ==
In 1999, the students on the Executive Council of the Campus Freethought Alliance, along with some other students, faculty advisers, and off-campus supporters, decided that a national student organization needed autonomy (the Campus Freethought Alliance was governed by the Council for Secular Humanism). Therefore, in April 2000, a majority of the members of the Campus Freethought Alliance Executive Council decided to become independent from the Council for Secular Humanism. The Secular Student Alliance was thus founded in May 2000 by eight student leaders from the grassroots secular movement. It was organized under the nonprofit corporation laws of Ohio on November 21, 2001. The corporation's principal office is located in Columbus, Ohio.

The SSA is an independent, democratically structured organization in the U.S. that promotes freethinking high school and college students. The SSA was formed "to organize, unite, educate and serve students and student communities that promote the ideals of scientific and critical inquiry, democracy, secularism, and human based ethics".

In January 2012, the SSA had over 312 affiliates in North America and abroad, including groups in Africa, Europe, Asia and Australia. In June 2013, the SSA announced that with the Freedom from Religion Foundation, it will work on educating students on their rights and will assist with rectifying violations. The SSA is a founding member of the Secular Coalition for America.

In October 2015, SSA tweeted that it "desperately" needed $100,000 by the end of the month. Executive director August Brunsman said fundraising had lagged. In October 2017, shortly after the hiring of new executive director Kevin Bolling, the organization relocated from Columbus, Ohio, to Los Angeles.

== Membership growth ==
The SSA experienced increasing membership growth from its founding in 2000 until 2012. Since then, it has steadily contracted to 237 groups in 2025. As of May 2018, the SSA's Board of Directors has twelve members. The number of SSA community college and university campus affiliates has expanded considerably in recent years:

- 2007 – 80 groups
- 2008 – 100 groups
- 2009 – 159 groups
- 2010 – 219 groups
- 2011 – 240 groups
- 2012 – 413 groups
- 2013 – 407 groups
- 2018 – 276 groups
- 2019 – 312 groups
- 2025 – 237 groups

== Events ==
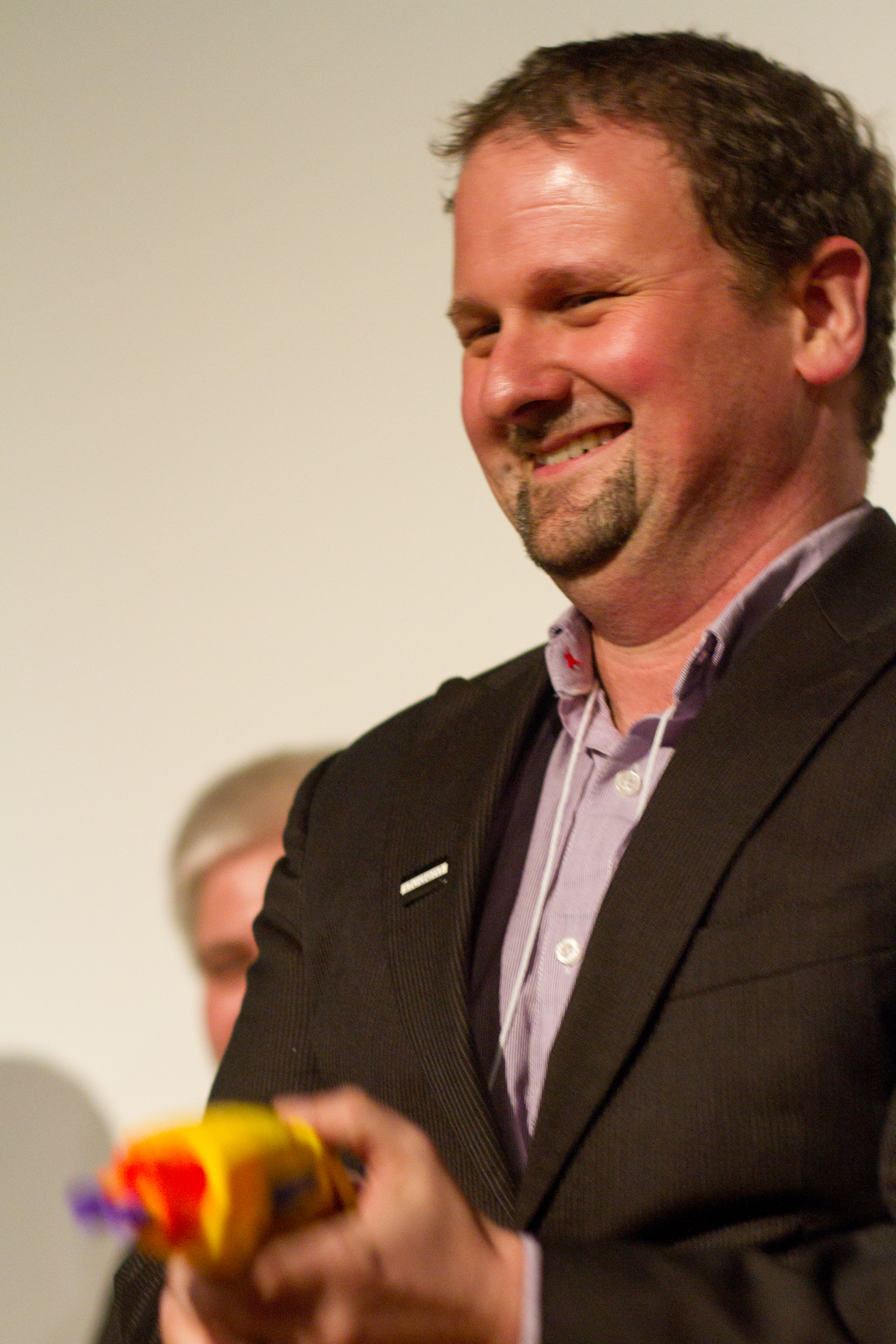
Executive director August Brunsman at SSACon 2015

On August 7, 2009, the SSA organized a trip to the Creation Museum in Petersburg, Kentucky. 304 students, atheists, and scientists attended, in order to familiarize themselves with the museum. One notable name in attendance was biologist and science blogger PZ Myers, who also came to experience the museum.

Since 2009, the SSA has held their Annual Leadership Conference over the Summer which aims to train student leaders and group members in leadership skills and grassroots organizing. In 2013, the conference was split into two locations (East and West).

== Conferences ==
The SSA holds an annual leadership conference.

Year	Location	Theme
2000	University of Minnesota (Minneapolis, Minnesota)	
2001	Ohio State University (Columbus, Ohio)	Kicking Ass for the New Enlightenment
2002	Chicago, Illinois	Education Against Indoctrination
2004	Washington, D.C.	
2005	Ohio State University (Columbus, Ohio)	Connecting the Secular Movement with Other Communities
2006	Kansas City, Missouri	We're Not in Kansas Anymore
2007	Harvard University (Cambridge, Massachusetts)	Harvard Humanist Chaplaincy 30th Anniversary Gala/Symposium
2008	Washington, D.C.	World Humanist Congress
2009	Ohio State University (Columbus, Ohio)	Freethinking Friends & Secular Cephalopods
2010	Ohio State University (Columbus, Ohio)	
2011	Ohio State University (Columbus, Ohio)	
2012	Ohio State University (Columbus, Ohio)	Contrary to Popular Belief
2013	Ohio State University (Columbus, Ohio) and University of Nevada, Las Vegas (Las Vegas, Nevada)	Contrary to Popular Belief
2014	Ohio State University (Columbus, Ohio) and Arizona State University (Tempe, Arizona)	Contrary to Popular Belief
2015	Ohio State University (Columbus, Ohio)	Contrary to Popular Belief
2018	Ohio State University (Columbus, Ohio)	Curiosity Courage Compassion
2019	University of Southern California (Los Angeles, California)	Better Together
2021	Virtual	Think Forward Move Forward
2022	Virtual	Think, Prepare, Advance
2023	University of Missouri-St Louis	
2024	University of Arkansas at Little Rock	
2025	University of Cincinnati	

== See also ==
- Equal Access Act
- List of secularist organizations
- Ryan J. Bell
