= Christian privilege =

Theoretical social advantage that is bestowed upon Christians in society

Christian privilege is a social advantage bestowed upon Christians in any historically Christian society. This arises out of the presumption that Christian belief is a social norm, that leads to the marginalization of the nonreligious and members of other religions through institutional religious discrimination or religious persecution. Christian privilege can also lead to the neglect of outsiders' cultural heritage and religious practices.

== Overview ==
Christian privilege is a type of dominant group privilege where the unconscious or conscious attitudes and beliefs of Christians are advantageous to Christians over non-Christians. Examples include opinions that non-Christian beliefs are inferior or dangerous, or that those who adhere to non-Christian beliefs are amoral, immoral, or sinful. Such prejudices pervade established social institutions, are reinforced by the broader society, and have evolved as part of its history.

Lewis Z. Schlosser observes that the exposure of Christian privilege breaks a "sacred taboo", and that "both subtle and obvious pressures exist to ensure that these privileges continue to be in the sole domain of Christians. This process is comparable to the way in which whites and males, according to many, continue to (consciously and unconsciously) ensure the privilege of their racial and gender groups".

In the United States, White mainstream Protestant denominations have greater degrees of privilege than minority Christian denominations. Such minority denominations include African American churches, Christian Hispanics and Latinos, Amish people, Mennonite, Quakers, Seventh-day Adventists, Jehovah's Witnesses, adherents of the Eastern Orthodox Church, Christian scientists, Mormons, and in some instances, Catholics.

When dominating groups within societies place Christian cultural norms and perspectives on individuals holding differing viewpoints, those people are sometimes deemed, in social justice terms, to be oppressed. These norms can be imposed "on institutions by individuals and on individuals by institutions". These social and cultural norms define issues related to good and evil, health and sickness, normality and deviance, and a person's normative ethic.

== History ==
Alexis de Tocqueville the French political scientist and diplomat, traveled across the United States for nine months between 1831 and 1832, conducting research for his book Democracy in America. He noted a paradox of religion in the U.S. On the one hand, the United States promoted itself around the world as a country that valued both the "separation of church and state", and religious freedom and tolerance. On the other hand, "There is no country in the world where the Christian religion retains a greater influence over the souls of men than in America". He explained this paradox by proposing that with no officially sanctioned governmental religion, Christian denominations were compelled to compete with one another and promote themselves in order to attract and keep parishioners, thereby making religion even stronger. While the government did not support Christian churches as such, Tocqueville argued that religion should be considered the first political institution because of the enormous influence that churches had on the political process.

Although de Tocqueville favored U.S. style democracy, he found its major limitation to be in its limiting of independent thought and independent beliefs. In a country that promoted the notion that the majority rules, this effectively silenced minorities by what Tocqueville termed the "tyranny of the majority". Without specific guarantees of minority rights—in this case minority religious rights—there is a danger of religious domination over religious minorities and non-believers. The religious majority in the U.S. has historically been adherents of mainline Protestant Christian denominations who often assume that their values and standard apply equally to others.

Another traveler to the United States, social theorist Gunnar Myrdal examined U.S. society following World War II, and he noted a contradiction, which he termed "an American dilemma". He found an overriding commitment to democracy, liberty, freedom, human dignity, and egalitarian values, coexisting alongside deep-seated patterns of racial discrimination, privileging of white people, and the subordination of peoples of color. This contradiction has been reframed for contemporary consideration by the religious scholar, Diana Eck:

"The new American dilemma is real religious pluralism, and it poses challenges to America's Christian churches that are as difficult and divisive as those of race. Today, the invocation of a Christian America takes on a new set of tensions as our population of Muslim, Hindu, Sikh, and Buddhist neighbors grows. The ideal of a Christian America stands in contradiction to the spirit, if not the letter, of America's foundational principle of religious freedom"

== Christian hegemony ==
The concept of hegemony describes the ways in which a dominant group, in this case mainly Christians, disseminate their dominant social constructions as common sense, normative, or even universal, even though most of the world's inhabitants are not Christian. Christian hegemony also accepts Christianity as part of the natural order, even at times by those who are marginalized, disempowered, or rendered invisible by it. Thus, Christian hegemony helps to maintain the marginality of other religions and beliefs. According to Beaman, "the binary opposition of sameness/difference is reflected in Protestant/minority religion in which mainstream Protestantism is representative of the 'normal'".

The French philosopher, Michel Foucault, described how a dominant-group's hegemony is advanced through "discourses". Discourses include the ideas, written expressions, theoretical foundations, and language of the dominant culture. According to Foucault, dominant-group discourses pervade networks of social and political control, which he called "regimes of truth", and which function to legitimize what can be said, who has the authority to speak and be heard, and what is authorized as true or as the truth.

== Pervasiveness ==
Christian privilege at the individual level occurs in proselytizing to convert or reconvert non-Christians to Christianity. While many Christians view proselytizing as offering the gift of Jesus to the non-Christians, some non-believers and people of other faiths may view this as an imposition, manipulation, or oppression.

Social institutions—including but not limited to educational, governmental, and religious bodies—often maintain and perpetuate policies that explicitly or implicitly privilege and rendering invisible other groups based on social identity and social status.

Overt forms of oppression, when a dominant group tyrannizes a subordinate group, for example, apartheid, slavery and ethnic cleansing, are obvious. However, dominant group privilege is not as obvious, especially to members of dominant groups. Oppression in its fullest sense refers to structural or systemic constraints imposed on groups, even within constitutional democracies, and its "causes are embedded in unquestioned norms, habits, and symbols, in the assumptions underlying institutional rules and the collective consequences of following those rules".

Christian dominance is facilitated by its relative invisibility, and because of this invisibility, it is not analyzed, scrutinized, or confronted. Dominance is perceived as unremarkable or "normal". For example, some symbolism and rituals associated with religious holidays may appear to be free of religion. However, this very secularization can fortify Christian privilege and perpetuate Christian hegemony by making it harder to recognize and thus circumvent the constitutional requirements for the separation of religion and government.

Christian privilege and religious oppression exist in a symbiotic relationship. Oppression toward non-Christians gives rise to Christian privilege, and Christian privilege maintains oppression toward non-Christian individuals and faith communities.

== Criticism ==
According to Schlosser, many Christians reject the notion that they have any privilege by claiming that all religions are essentially the same. Thus, they have no more and no fewer benefits accorded to them than members of other faith communities. Blumenfeld notes the objections that some of his university students raise when discussing Christian privilege as connected with the celebration of Christian holidays. The students, he notes, state that many of the celebrations and decorations have nothing to do with religion as such, and do not represent Christianity, but are rather part of American culture—however, this could be considered a further example of privilege.

Scholars and jurists debate the exact scope of religious liberty protected by the First Amendment. It is unclear whether the amendment requires religious minorities to be exempted from neutral laws and whether the Free Exercise Clause requires Congress to exempt religious pacifists from conscription into the military. At a minimum, it prohibits Congress from, in the words of James Madison, compelling "men to worship God in any manner contrary to their conscience".

== See also ==
- Antisemitism in Christianity
- Christian persecution complex
- Critical theory
- Discrimination against atheists
- Glass ceiling
- History of Christian thought on persecution and tolerance
- Institutional racism
- Islamophobia
- Persecution of Christians
- Religious discrimination against Neopagans
- Reverse discrimination
- White privilege
