= The Satanic Temple =

Non-theistic religious organization

- Abbreviation: TST
- Type: Atheistic Satanism
- Classification: New religious movement
- Orientation: Activism, civil rights, protest, social justice, lobbying
- Spokesperson: Lucien Greaves
- Region: Australia, Europe, North America
- Headquarters: Salem, Massachusetts, 42.5313609°N 70.8913727°W
- Founder: Lucien Greaves; Malcolm Jarry (pseudonyms)
- Origin: 2012
- Members: 700,000+
- Tax status: U.S. IRS 501(c)(3)
- Official website: thesatanictemple.com

The Satanic Temple (TST) is a non-theistic new religious movement, founded in 2012 and headquartered in Salem, Massachusetts, United States. Established in response to the "intrusion of Christian values on American politics", congregations have also formed in Australia, Belgium, Canada, Finland, Germany, Luxembourg, the Netherlands, and the United Kingdom. Co-founded by Lucien Greaves, the organization's spokesperson, and Malcolm Jarry, the group views Satan neither as a supernatural being, nor a symbol of evil, but instead relies on the literary Satan as a symbol representing "the eternal rebel" against arbitrary authority and social norms, or as a metaphor to promote pragmatic skepticism, rational reciprocity, personal autonomy, and curiosity.

The organization's mission encourages "benevolence and empathy" among all people, using Satanic imagery to promote civil rights, egalitarianism, religious skepticism, social justice, bodily integrity, secularism, and the separation of church and state; relying on religious satire, theatrical ploys, humor, and legal action in their public campaigns to "generate attention and prompt people to reevaluate fears and perceptions", and to "highlight religious hypocrisy and encroachment on religious freedom." The organization participates in political actions such as lobbying efforts, with a focus on exposing Christian privilege when it interferes with personal religious freedom. It considers marriage a religious sacrament that should be governed under the First Amendment's protection of religious freedom which should prevail over state laws. The group views restrictions on abortion, including mandatory waiting periods, as an infringement on the rights of Satanists to practice their religion.

TST is reportedly "the largest Satanic organization in history". Its adherents generally refer to their religion as "Satanism" or "Modern Satanism", while others refer to TST's religion as "Compassionate Satanism" or "Seven Tenet Satanism".

== History ==
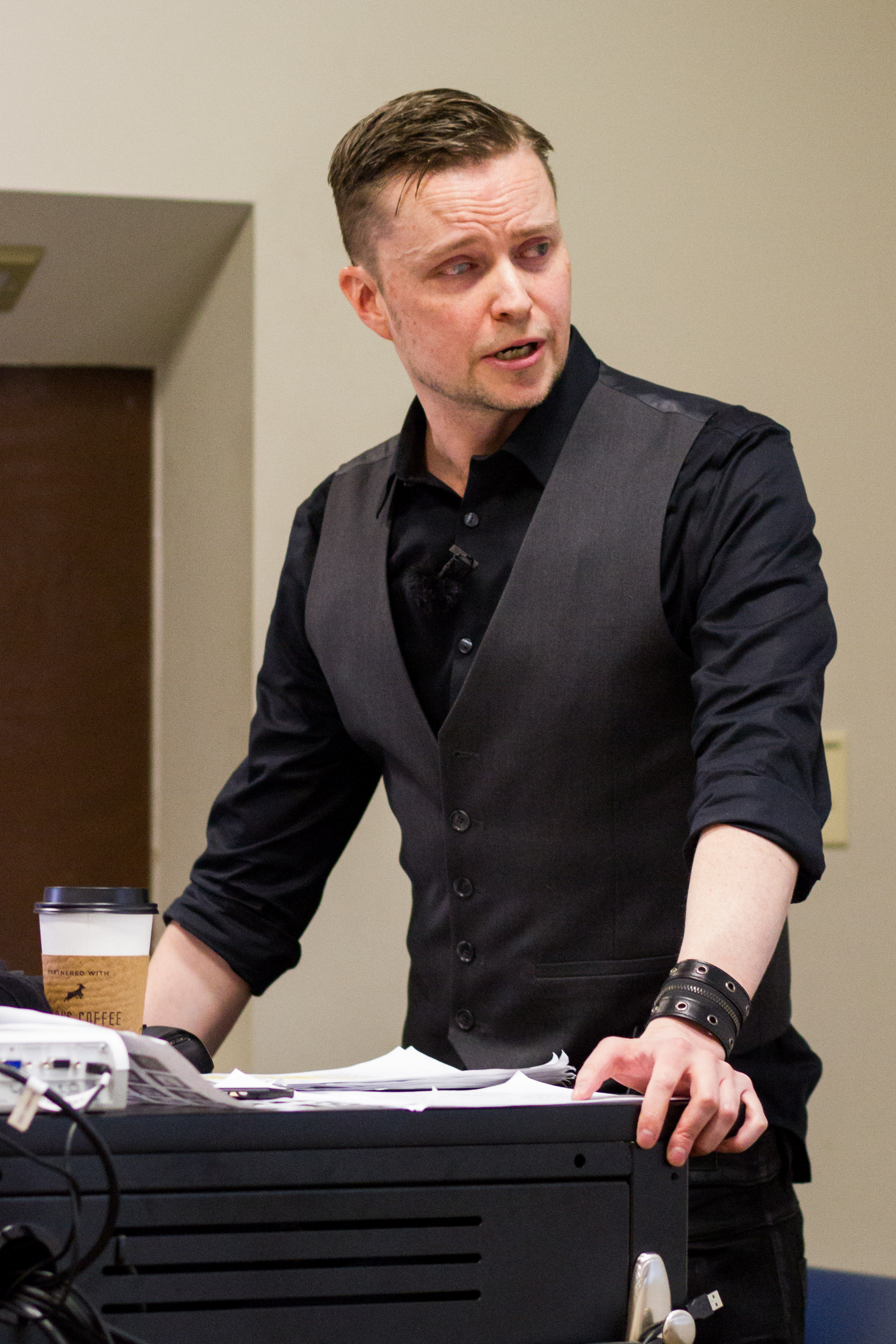
Lucien Greaves, spokesperson for the Satanic Temple, at SASHAcon, March 2016

Cofounders Lucien Greaves and Malcolm Jarry met in 2012, and the Satanic Temple was active by January 2013. In an interview with The New York Times, Malcolm Jarry stated that the idea of starting a Satanic faith-based organization was first conceived to meet "all the Bush administration's criteria for receiving funds, but was repugnant to them". Jarry was referring to former president George W. Bush's formation of the White House Office of Faith-Based and Neighborhood Partnerships.

According to scholar Joseph Laycock, Jarry was inspired to organize a rally of Satanists (hiring actors to play Satanists) after actions by Governor Rick Scott of Florida to promote religion. In March 2012, Scott had signed a bill that passed the Florida state legislature allowing public school students to read inspirational messages at assemblies and sporting events—a way to circumvent a Supreme Court's ruling against mandatory prayer in school. In January 2013, Jarry's pretend Satanists rallied to praise Scott for his new law which would allow satanic students "to share their love of Satan" in public schools. After this event, the Westboro Baptist Church came to Boston, where Jarry and Greaves lived, to picket the funerals of the victims of the Boston Marathon bombing. Jarry and Greaves decided to retaliate by going to Meridan, Mississippi, to perform a "pink mass" over the grave of the mother of the Westboro's founder, Fred Phelps Sr. During the July 2013 "pink mass", gay couples made out over the grave and the Temple announced that this ritual would turn Phelps' mother gay in the afterlife. The positive publicity the event received reportedly made the Satanic Temple nationally known.

=== Headquarters ===
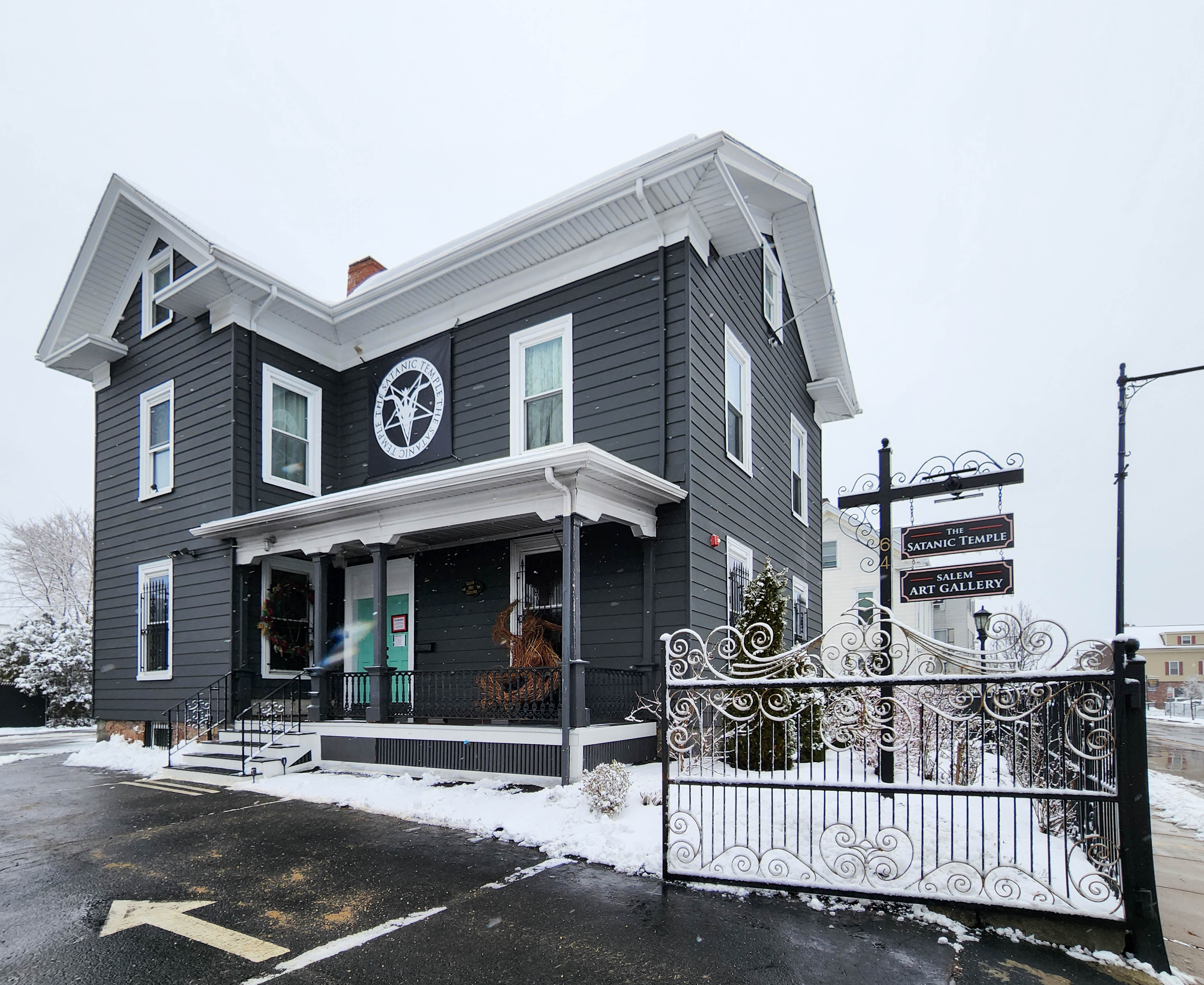
Headquarter of the Satanic Temple at Salem, Massachusetts

The Satanic Temple opened its official headquarters in Salem, Massachusetts, in 2016. The former Victorian funeral home is painted charcoal and doubles as the Salem Art Gallery. The headquarters includes a Fine Art room, La Voisin Chamber (dedicated to Catherine Monvoisin), Library, the Milton Hall exhibition space, and a room for its Statue of Baphomet. The library includes a focus on the history of Satanic panic.

The space has since come under threat on multiple occasions. Chelsea resident Daniel Lucey set fire to the Salem facility's porch on June 10, 2022. Local fire rescue personnel had the flames under control shortly after arriving on the scene. The building was occupied at the time, but everyone was evacuated and no injuries occurred; damage was limited, though the porch and several windows had to be replaced. The Salem Police Department reported a bomb threat to the headquarters on March 2, 2023, stating they were taking the threat seriously and following public safety management mandates. In 2024, a man threw a pipe bomb onto the front entrance and left a note directed at Satanists nearby. The bomb failed to fully detonate and only caused minor exterior damage. The man, Sean Patrick Palmer of Perkins, Oklahoma, was sentenced to five years in prison.

=== Tax-exempt status ===
On April 25, 2019, the Temple announced it had received tax-exempt status from the Internal Revenue Service, being classified as a "church or a convention or association of churches". The Satanic Temple had previously been reluctant to pursue tax-exempt status until the Johnson Amendment was weakened by an executive order "Promoting Free Speech and Religious Liberty" signed by President Trump in May 2017, which TST viewed as unfairly giving higher status to religious individuals.

Announcing the new tax status co-founder Lucien Greaves stated: "In light of theocratic assaults upon the Separation of Church and State in the legislative effort to establish a codified place of privilege for one religious viewpoint, we feel that accepting religious tax exemption—rather than renouncing in protest—can help us to better assert our claims to equal access and exemption while laying to rest any suspicion that we don’t meet the qualifications of a true religious organization. Satanism is here to stay."

The Satanic Temple claims on its website to be "the only Satanic religious organization recognized as a church by the IRS and the Federal Court System."

=== International followers ===
TST was structured based on the assumption of operating within the United States. TST has had challenges acclimating to the diverse needs of international followers, chapters, and congregations. The organization was unwilling to assist members in establishing chapters where the risk of religiously motivated violence was considered too high (such as Peru and Uganda) out of concerns for their well-being. The difficulties associated with incorporating international members into the organization has led to at least one religious schism, which gave birth to another religious Satanic organization called the Global Order of Satan.

=== Legal issues ===
The cofounders have been accused of 501c fraud, sexual abuse including violations of the Hatch Act, and odd associations with former employees children. The Satanic Temple has lost or been denied motions with regards to various lawsuits over the years such as when U.S. District Judge Richard A. Jones of the Western District of Washington ruled Feb. 26 2021 that five charges leveled by the United Federation of Churches LLC, otherwise known as The Satanic Temple, were without merit.

== Mission, beliefs, and holidays ==
According to the organization's website, the mission of the Satanic Temple is to:

...encourage benevolence and empathy among all people, reject tyrannical authority, advocate practical common sense, oppose injustice, and undertake noble pursuits. The Satanic Temple has publicly confronted hate groups, fought for the abolition of corporal punishment in public schools, applied for equal representation when religious installations are placed on public property, provided religious exemption and legal protection against laws that unscientifically restrict women's reproductive autonomy, exposed harmful pseudo-scientific practitioners in mental health care, organized clubs alongside other religious after-school clubs in schools besieged by proselytizing organizations, and engaged in other advocacy in accordance with our tenets.

=== Tenets ===
The Satanic Temple has seven fundamental tenets:

1. One should strive to act with compassion and empathy toward all creatures in accordance with reason.
2. The struggle for justice is an ongoing and necessary pursuit that should prevail over laws and institutions.
3. One's body is inviolable, subject to one's own will alone.
4. The freedoms of others should be respected, including the freedom to offend. To willfully and unjustly encroach upon the freedoms of another is to forgo one's own.
5. Beliefs should conform to one's best scientific understanding of the world. One should take care never to distort scientific facts to fit one's beliefs.
6. People are fallible. If one makes a mistake, one should do one's best to rectify it and resolve any harm that might have been caused.
7. Every tenet is a guiding principle designed to inspire nobility in action and thought. The spirit of compassion, wisdom, and justice should always prevail over the written or spoken word.

=== Holidays ===
The Satanic Temple promotes five holidays:

Date	Event
February 15	Lupercalia
April 30	Hexennacht
July 25	Unveiling Day
October 31	Halloween
December 25	Sol Invictus

== Community and subgroups ==
=== Black Mass ===
In May 2014, the Temple scheduled a Black Mass to be held on the Harvard University campus, sponsored by the Harvard Extension Cultural Studies Club; the event was forced to relocate off campus due to significant opposition by Roman Catholic Archdiocese of Boston and school administrators.

=== Los Angeles Satanic Mass ===
On January 14, 2017, the Temple hosted what it billed as the largest Satanic gathering in history, hoping to double the attendance of the 2015 gathering in Detroit for the Baphomet unveiling. Film crews from VICE and NatGeo were on hand to document the event. The mass included three parts: Invocation Ritual, Destruction Ritual and a Bloodletting Ritual. Local Los Angeles media was also on hand to cover the event, calling the event "a bloody good time".

=== Pentagram ritual ===
On June 6, 2016, the Temple performed a pentagram ritual around the California city of Lancaster in Los Angeles County, to support California State Senate candidate Steve Hill, who hoped to be the first Satanic Temple member elected to public office.

=== SatanCon ===
On February 12, 2022, the Satanic Temple held their first SatanCon convention inside Saguaro Hotel in Scottsdale, Arizona. Outside the hotel, hundreds of Christians protested the convention holding crucifixes, crosses, and signs denouncing Satan.

The Satanic Temple announced the celebration of its 10th anniversary at SatanCon 2023, held April 28–30, 2023, in downtown Boston, Massachusetts.

=== Sober Faction ===
The Satanic Temple Sober Faction is a peer support group that offers a Satanic approach to recovery from addiction. Sober Faction meetings assist those who are suffering from addiction in finding sobriety without including or invoking religion in the recovery process.

The Sober Faction's method is guided by TST's Seven Tenets and utilizes the Seven Rituals, which were crafted specifically for the Sober Faction's recovery program. The ritual process promotes self-empowerment while giving structure to each individual's recovery journey.

The group recognizes and respects that there are multiple perspectives and multiple approaches to recovery. The group explicitly says that meetings are not a professional form of therapy, and that anyone struggling with addiction should also seek help from a medical professional.

== Representation in the public sphere ==
=== Baphomet statue ===
A monumental bronze sculpture depicting Baphomet, a goat-headed, angel-winged occult idol, was crowdfunded in 2014 and unveiled in 2015. The statue has figured prominently in challenges about the display of the Ten Commandments at the capitols of Arkansas and Oklahoma.

=== Baphometic Bowl of Wisdom ===
The sculpture, Baphometic Bowl of Wisdom, a Satanic monument intended to pay homage to veterans, was approved for installation on public grounds. Planned to be placed in a memorial park in Belle Plaine, Minnesota, next to an established religious statue of a soldier kneeling at a cross. The monument faced opposition from local residents and external Christian groups. Subsequently, the city retracted its permission for the installation just days before the scheduled event, leading to the removal of both the proposed statue and the existing religious sculpture.

=== Bladensburg Peace Cross Ceremony ===
Following the Supreme Court's 2019 ruling that the Bladensburg Cross does not conflict with the First Amendment, since it honors veterans of all faiths, the Satanic Temple created a monument to honor Satanic veterans. Named the Bladensburg Satanic Peace Cross, TST held its first memorial ceremony on 10 July 2021. The Satanic Temple encouraged satanists to make a pilgrimage to Bladensburg, Maryland, to pay tribute to their fallen veterans.

=== Holiday displays ===
A Leviathan cross

Chapters throughout the United States have erected various displays to appear adjacent to Christian Nativity scenes on public grounds. A display in the Florida State Capitol rotunda in 2014 featured an angel falling from the sky into a pit of flames, which was vandalized and then modified as a result. That same year a display at the Michigan State Capitol featured the message "The Greatest Gift is Knowledge" and a depiction of a snake wrapped around a black Leviathan cross. Sponsored by the Detroit chapter, this "Snaketivity" display returned to Lansing capitol grounds in 2015, and again in 2016.

The Chicago chapter updated "Snaketivity" as a sculpture for display in the Illinois State Capitol rotunda in 2018: with a serpent coiled around a woman's hand presenting an apple, and the message "Knowledge is the Greatest Gift" inscribed on the supporting pedestal; the same sculpture returned in 2019. The West Michigan chapter installed a Yule goat outside their state's capitol on the 2019 winter solstice.

Following a pandemic hiatus on holiday displays in their State Capitol, the Illinois congregation announced a new sculpture for the rotunda in celebration of Sol Invictus 2021: Baphomet as a newborn baby. Local Catholic bishop Thomas Paprocki declined an invitation to attend the installation of the statue, which took place December 20. Illinois congregants returned to the rotunda in 2022 with a crochet display of apples and the serpent of Genesis, paired with a book by Copernicus that had been banned by the Vatican for centuries.

New displays were organized by local congregations in 2023, with a decorated tree at the National Railroad Museum in Wisconsin, as well as a mirror-covered, red-cloaked Baphomet statue at the Iowa State Capitol. After the Iowa display was vandalized, organizers salvaged some remaining altar elements. A former Republican Congressional candidate from Mississippi was charged with a felony and violation of "individual rights" under Iowa's hate crime law.

An installation in front of the New Hampshire State House was vandalized and restored multiple times in December 2024.

=== Scottsdale, Arizona invocation challenge ===
Scottsdale City Council denied a 2016 request from the Satanic Temple's Arizona chapter to give an invocation at the Council meeting; denial was based on the grounds that only groups with "substantial connections to the community" are allowed (the pastor of First Southern Baptist Church of Scottsdale was selected instead). The Satanic Temple maintains there was never any "local community" question during the application process. The Arizona chapter's co-founder Michelle Shortt filed suit against the city, saying they had "no written policy regarding prayer and only reversed its decision after backlash from the community and city officials." The City Council unanimously approved additional funds to litigate a January 2020 federal court trial in Phoenix. The Satanic Temple has appealed the judge's ruling.

== School campaigns ==
=== After School Satan ===
The Satanic Temple sponsors After School Satan, an after-school program where students engage with rationalist pursuits, scientific games, nature activities, and community service. The program offers an alternative to after-school Christian missionary programs such as the Good News Club. Organized by individual local groups since 2016, four After School Satan clubs were active at the end of 2023. In 2024 The Satanic Temple partnered with the Secular Student Alliance, another organization promoting secular values among students, in supporting After School Satan clubs.

=== Prayer in schools ===
The organization first gained media attention in January 2013 after a group of Satanists assembled at the Florida State Capitol to show their approval over a bill Governor Rick Scott signed into law the prior year, Senate Bill 98, which allowed student-led prayer at school assemblies. The group further stated that as the bill did not specify a religion, the prayers could be led by a student from any religion—including Satanism. The TST members announced they "were coming out to say how happy we were because now our Satanic children could pray to Satan in school."

=== Protect Children Project ===
Launched by the Satanic Temple in the spring of 2014, the Protect Children Project aims to offer "First Amendment protection to support children who may be at risk for being subjected to mental or physical abuse in school by teachers and administrators through the use of solitary confinement, restraints, and corporal punishment." The Protect Children Project's website asked participants to print out pre-written letters to send to their respective school boards on a day designated as "Protect Children Day" as a form of protest. In March 2017, the Satanic Temple launched an anti-spanking campaign against corporal punishment in schools, as part of the Protect Children Project. They unveiled billboards in Texas which read "Never be hit in school again. Exercise your religious rights."

=== Collegiate Affiliate Program ===
The Collegiate Affiliate Program (CAP) is the Satanic Temple's campaign to provide post-secondary students with advocacy for Satanic representation on their school's campuses. CAP groups work with a Minister of Satan to create projects and a mission for the student group based on institutional guidelines and specific objectives. This campaign is currently only in the US, on campuses that already have religious groups.

== Reproductive autonomy ==
=== Demonstrations and counter-protests ===
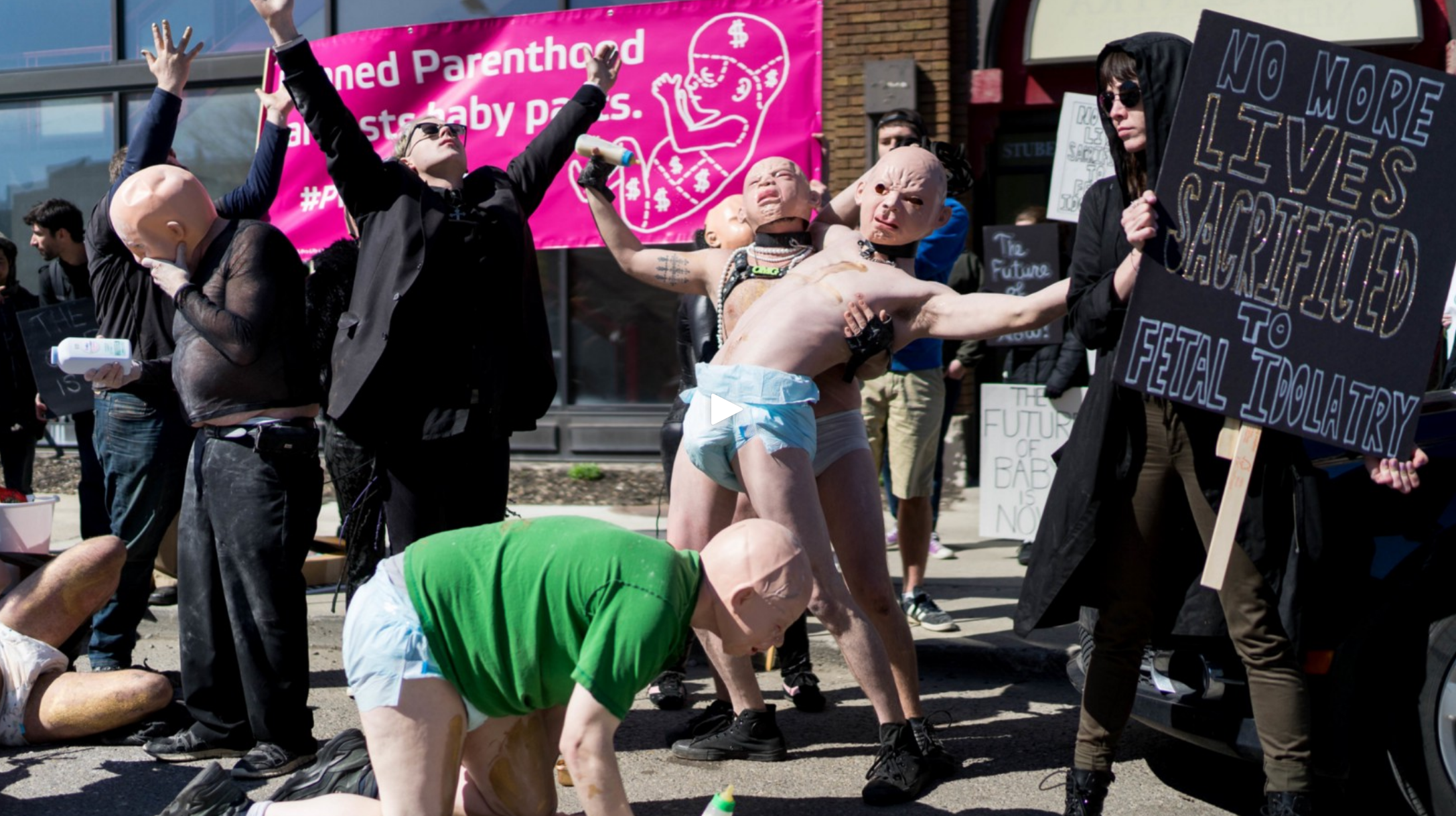
"Future of Baby is Now", an abortion rights protest by The Satanic Temple

Satanic Temple members demonstrated in support of reproductive autonomy at a 2013 protest, bringing children to the Texas State Capitol to chant "Fuck You" and "Hail Satan", while holding signs reading "Stay Out of My Mommy's Vagina".

The Satanic Temple Detroit chapter held a counter-protest outside of a Planned Parenthood location in Ferndale on August 22, 2015, in response to anti-abortion group plans to protest that same day. The counter-protest included a guerrilla theatre performance with two men dressed as clergy pouring milk on kneeling actresses.

Detroit chapter members, led by Jex Blackmore, counter-protested the Citizens for a Pro-Life Society's protest of Planned Parenthood on April 23, 2016. Temple members dressed in bondage fetish clothing, wearing baby masks and diapers while engaging in flagellation. The Temple said that the reason for the protest was to "expose the anti-choice protest as an act of fetal idolatry, highlighting the fetishization and abstraction of the 'baby.'"

=== Religious abortion ritual ===
Following a failed abortion lawsuit in June 2020, the Satanic Temple announced a religious abortion ritual on August 5, 2020, which allowed members living in RFRA states to be exempt from "enduring medically unnecessary and unscientific abortion regulations when seeking to terminate their pregnancy". In September 2021, as part of its opposition to the Texas Heartbeat Act, the Satanic Temple wrote the U.S. Food and Drug Administration, saying that it had a faith-based right to access medical abortion drugs, including misoprostol and mifepristone. Temple lawyers protest a specific Texas abortion law, recently sustained by the US Supreme Court, arguing that the Temple's status as a non-theistic religious organization should ensure access to abortion as a faith-based right.

The 2022 Dobbs decision, overturning Roe v. Wade, ended federal abortion rights and allowed individual states to regulate abortion laws. The Satanic Temple subsequently proclaimed itself "the leading beacon of light in the battle for abortion access", making lofty claims regarding the protection of their "religious exemption". Jezebel magazine critiqued these claims as overly simplistic, unproven, and potentially resulting in legal jeopardy. Other reproductive rights organizations echoed similar critiques of the Satanic Temple's broad claims. While the Satanic Temple offers a dedicated email address for members who encounter legal problems when seeking an abortion using its religious exemption form, the Temple's lawyer Matthew Kezhaya advised members to consult with their local minister "for further evaluation and discussion".

=== Abortion medical services ===
The Temple opened a New Mexico medical clinic offering medication abortions in February 2023. Operated by TST Health, the "Samuel Alito's Mom's Satanic Abortion Clinic" will offer free medical consultations and prescribe abortion medication, delivered by mail. Guided by a Satanic Temple minister, patients participate in the abortion ritual, reciting tenets about bodily autonomy and the importance of science. Additional clinics subsequently opened in Virginia and Maine.

The Temple's abortion ritual was depicted in a Hobby Lobby bathroom for the "Sam Alito's Mom" music video, released in August 2026 by the band Satanic Planet.

== Other campaigns and initiatives ==
=== Grey Faction ===
The Grey Faction is a project of the Satanic Temple with the goal of exposing malpractice and pseudoscience associated with Satanic ritual abuse conspiracy theories. The Grey Faction protests medical conferences, initiates legal action, and petitions medical boards. The faction has protested conferences held by the International Society for the Study of Trauma and Dissociation, which, it claims, advocates the discredited practice of recovered-memory therapy. The group has also petitioned for investigation into the killing by Gigi Jordan of her child, which was connected to the discredited practice of facilitated communication.

=== Pink Mass ===
In July 2013, the Satanic Temple held a "Pink Mass" over the grave of Catherine Johnston, the mother of Westboro Baptist Church founder Fred Phelps. The mass was held after the Westboro Baptist Church announced their intention to picket the funerals of the victims of the Boston Marathon bombing. The Pink Mass was officiated by Greaves and consisted of two gay men kissing over Johnston's grave while Greaves touched the tombstone with his genitals and chanted an incantation intended to change the deceased's sexual orientation. Greaves was charged with a misdemeanor and was told that if he returned to Lauderdale County, Mississippi, where Johnston's grave is, he would be arrested. Shortly before Phelps's death, on March 19, 2014, the Satanic Temple expressed interest in holding a similar ceremony for the church founder. The blessing of same-sex marriages is allowed in the Satanic Temple.

=== Muslim refugee activism ===
In November 2015, the Temple received media attention for offering to take in Muslims or refugees that were afraid of experiencing backlash over the 2015 terrorist attacks in Paris.

=== Demonization of Junipero Serra ===
The Temple's Los Angeles Chapter has also protested the canonization of Junípero Serra by Pope Francis and in October 2015 they held a ceremony where they "demonized" the Christian missionary, stating that Serra helped enslave thousands of Native Americans and that he "also led The Spanish Inquisition in his territories, trying residents of the Missions for the crimes of sorcery, witchcraft and devil worship."

== Membership ==
Individuals dedicated to the tenets of the Satanic Temple can join on the organization's website. Members can apply to join local congregations, though local requirements may differ: "If there's a local [congregation] where you are, to join you do have to be accepted, but there's no initiation or anything. You don't even have to be a Satanist, you can just be a strong ally who believes in the political and secular actions without being super stoked about all the aesthetic aspects."

Membership is subject to termination for "failure to uphold the spirit of the Satanic Temple and its tenets." A member who used a TST event to call for violence against then-president Donald Trump was expelled.

=== Congregations ===
Local groups of organized TST members may form congregations. Some congregations are endorsed by TST to "participate in campaigns, social events, and other activities relevant to their local regions, as well as in concert with national TST campaigns". TST encourages members to form congregations where none exist or join pre-established ones, but does not actively establish them itself. As of 2026 congregations are established across the continental United States and in Canada, Finland, Germany, and Benelux.

Congregations were initially known as chapters; the first chapter was established in 2014 in Detroit, Michigan. That chapter went on hiatus in 2018, the same year chapters in Portland, Oregon, Los Angeles, California, and the UK seceded from the Satanic Temple over internal disputes with national leadership.

== Comparison to LaVeyan Satanism ==
Lucien Greaves has described the Temple as being a progressive and updated version of LaVey's Satanism. The Temple views itself as separate and distinct from its forerunner, representing "a natural evolution in Satanic thought". Greaves has shared a detailed refutation of LaVey's doctrines, and claims that the elements of Social Darwinism and Nietzscheanism within LaVeyan Satanism are incongruent with game theory, reciprocal altruism, and cognitive science. He has also criticized the LaVeyan Church of Satan for its lack of political lobbying and what he sees as their exclusivity, referring to them as autocratic and hierarchical, and saying that the Church fetishizes authoritarianism.

Conversely, the Church of Satan has claimed that Anton LaVey "codified" Satanism "as a religion and philosophy" with the Church of Satan in 1966, so that we have "five decades of a clearly defined belief system called Satanism expounded by a worldwide organization", namely the Church of Satan. Members of the Satanic Temple, in contrast, are merely "masquerading as Satanists" and do not represent Satanism.

Joseph P. Laycock attributes the origin of the Temple and the difference between the two groups to the "culture war" between traditionalists/conservatives and liberal/secularists "fueled by demographic changes". At least in the United States where the temple is based, the number of adults identifying as Christian is shrinking (63% as of 2021 down from 78% in 2007) and those identifying with no religion is growing (29% in 2021, up from 16% in 2007), Christians have become alarmed. At least some observers have suggested that the increasing political activism of American conservatives in the 1990s and 21st century on issues such as abortion, teaching of the theory of evolution, gun politics, separation of church and state, privacy, recreational drug use, homosexuality, censorship, is an attempt to "compensate" for their loss of cultural power "by using the power of the state". In the meantime the growing number of secular/Religiously Unaffiliated have also become politically aroused. In addition, the sizeable number of people who were told as adolescents that the "rock music or the game Dungeons and Dragons" they enjoyed were satanic, are now grown and have a very different idea than earlier generations as to the relative merits of Satanism versus Christians—or at least politically active conservative Christians. Laycock argues that the shift in interest among Satanists toward political activism, between the founding of the Church of Satan and the establishment of the Satanic Temple, can be explained in part by their desire to counter the influence of conservative Christians.

== Reception ==
Christian religious organizations have criticized many actions by the Satanic Temple. Critics accuse the Temple of being unserious: merely a prank, public satire, gaming the system, or elaborate trolling attempt. Greaves clarified in a 2013 interview that the Temple could be both satanic and satirical, and maintains that freedom of speech prevails regardless of political opinion regarding such criticism. Blackmore dismissed claims that the Temple was simply "trying to cause trouble for no reason except to just be shocking", instead she defended the Temple "adding to the dialogue that's already there and asking for rights—just like anyone else."

Extremists have made death threats against multiple leaders of the Satanic Temple. In June 2022, a man attempted to set fire to the TST headquarters in Salem, Massachusetts. He was charged with a hate crime. In 2023, the TST statue in the Iowa capitol building was vandalized by a former Republican candidate for a Congressional seat in Mississippi, who was charged with hate crime. In January 2024, Salem police arrested a Michigan resident for planning to attack the TST building with explosives. An Oklahoma man has been indicted by a federal grand jury in Boston for allegedly throwing a pipe bomb at The Satanic Temple on April 8, 2024.

Salon's Valerie Tarico described the Tenets as egalitarian, conducive towards equanimity, "truer to the words of Jesus than most Christians", expressing both compassion and empathy.

The organization was the focus of the 2020 academic monograph Speak of the Devil: How the Satanic Temple Is Changing the Way We Talk About Religion.

In Russia, the Satanic Temple has been outlawed and designated as an "undesirable organization".

== Schisms and internal dissent ==
The Satanic Temple has sparked the development of other Satanic religious organizations, whether amicably or through religious schism.

Prominent chapter leader Jex Blackmore left the organization in March 2018, over statements deemed too extreme by the national TST organization. In a later interview, Blackmore criticized TST as corrupt: "The organization badly yearns to be deemed legitimate in the eyes of those in power but they will never achieve this aim, even if their litigious activities are successful. Our work, whatever it is, must come from a place of authenticity."

The Global Order of Satan was founded in 2018 following the departure of the TST-UK and London chapters, which had voted no confidence in TST. This schism was motivated by TST removing two consecutive UK chapter heads: the first for engaging in unapproved campaigns, and the second for "personality clashes".

The group HelLA formed in 2018 following a rift based on ethical concerns; the Los Angeles chapter objected to TST's acceptance of pro-bono legal work from the free-speech lawyer Marc Randazza, as well as "the complete lack of racial diversity" among TST leadership. The ex-chapter head also cited a disagreement with Lucien Greaves' absolutist philosophy on free speech.

Several "approved administrators" of the TST-Washington chapter left the Temple and took control of the chapter's social media pages in March 2020. TST responded with a lawsuit against the former members, and subsequently sued Newsweek magazine, claiming defamatory coverage of the matter.

Amidst a flurry of disaffiliations and resignations in May 2024, several state groups–including Colorado, Florida, and Minnesota–severed ties with the national TST organization. As TST Ministers raised internal criticisms, some dissenting groups formed the independent Coalition of Satanic Congregations. A paper sculpture phoenix drew ire at the Minnesota State Capitol in December 2024.

== See also ==
- Campaigns against corporal punishment
- Creation and evolution in public education
- Culture jamming
- Freedom From Religion Foundation
- Flying Spaghetti Monster
