= Ten Commandments Monument =

Ten Commandments Monument may refer to:

== Africa ==
- Ten Commandments Monument, Dwoi, Plateau State, Nigeria

== North America ==
- Ten Commandments Monument (Austin, Texas)
- Ten Commandments Monument (Little Rock, Arkansas)
- Ten Commandments Monument (Oklahoma City)
- Ten Commandments Monument, Tuskahoma, Oklahoma, located at the Choctaw Capitol Building
- Ten Commandments Memorial, Phoenix, Arizona, located in Wesley Bolin Memorial Plaza
- Ten Commandments Monument, Pleasant Grove, Utah, implicated in Pleasant Grove City v. Summum
- Ten Commandments Monument, removed from the rotunda of the Alabama Judicial Building, per Glassroth v. Moore
- Ten Commandments Monument, removed from the grounds of Bloomfield, New Mexico city hall
- Ten Commandments Monument, removed from the grounds of Haskell County, Oklahoma courthouse, per Green v. Haskell County Board of Commissioners

== Europe ==
- Monument of Ten Commandments, architectural complex in Ukraine

== See also ==
- United States debate over display of the Ten Commandments on public property
