= Prescott v. Oklahoma Capitol Preservation Commission =

- Court: Supreme Court of Oklahoma
- Full case name: Dr. Bruce Prescott, James Huff, Donald Chabot, and Cheryl Franklin, Plaintiff-Appelants, v. Oklahoma Capitol Preservation Commission, Defendant-Appelee.
- Decided: July 27, 2015
- Citation: 2015 OK 54, 373 P.3d 1032

Case history
- Prior history: Plaintiff appealed from the decision of the District Court of Oklahoma County
- Subsequent history: District Court ruling reversed, matter remanded for further proceedings consistent with opinion, request for rehearing denied

Holding
- Display of a Ten Commandments Monument on the grounds of the Oklahoma State Capitol is unconstitutional

Court membership
- Judges sitting: Chief Justice John F. Reif; Vice Chief Justice Doug Combs; Associate Justices Yvonne Kauger, Joseph M. Watt, James R. Winchester, James E. Edmondson, Tom Colbert, Steven W. Taylor, Noma Gurich

Case opinions
- Majority: Per Curiam, joined by Reif, Kauger, Watt, Winchester, Edmondson, Taylor, Gurich
- Dissent: Combs
- Dissent: Colbert

Laws applied
- Okla. Const. arts. 2, § 5

Prescott v. Oklahoma Capitol Preservation Commission, 2015 OK 54, 373 P.3d 1032, was a landmark case by the Oklahoma Supreme Court in which the Court found the placement of a Ten Commandments Monument at the Oklahoma State Capitol was unconstitutional.

== Facts ==
The Oklahoma Capitol Preservation Commission is an agency of the government of Oklahoma charged with permitting and overseeing the display, creation, alteration, and usage of art and architecture for both the interior and exterior of the Oklahoma State Capitol building and associated complex. Under authorization by the Oklahoma Legislature in 2009, the Commission installed a Ten Commandments Monument on the north side of the Capitol in 2012. The Monument was not created using public funds but was rather a donation by Republican State Representative Mike Ritze from Broken Arrow.

The American Civil Liberties Union (ACLU) brought suit against the Commission in the District Court of Oklahoma County, alleging the Monument violated Article 2, Section 5 of the Oklahoma Constitution. Such section prohibits the State government from using public funds or public property for the benefit of sectarian religious purposes. The ACLU sought an injunction permanently barring the Commission from displaying the Monument. Republican Oklahoma Attorney General Scott Pruitt responded to the lawsuit, arguing, under the 2005 United States Supreme Court case of Van Orden v. Perry, the Monument was constitutional.

District Judge Thomas E. Prince found in the Commission's favor, ruling the Monument did not violate the Oklahoma Constitution.

== Ruling ==
By a 7-2 majority, the Oklahoma Supreme Court found that the monument violated the Oklahoma Constitution. The majority found the purpose Section 5 to be prohibiting the State government from using any public funds or property for the benefit of any religious purpose. Such a prohibition was found to be exceptionally broad, including both direct and indirect benefits. While recognizing the holding in Van Orden was sufficient for the purposes of the First Amendment to the United States Constitution, the non-religious historic purpose of the Monument were not sufficient to overcoming the obviously religious nature of the Monument for the purposes of the Oklahoma Constitution.

== Impact ==
The case has proven both influential and controversial, leading to calls for changing the Oklahoma Constitution from some conservatives in the Oklahoma Legislature. The case has been subject to heavy press coverage both in Oklahoma and nationally.

== See also ==
- Ten Commandments Monument (Oklahoma City)
