= Oklahoma Council of Public Affairs =

Non-profit organization in the USA

- Established: 1993
- Chair: Larry Parman
- President: Jonathan Small
- Staff: 10
- Budget: Revenue: $4.02 million Expenses: $3.54 million (FYE December 2023)
- Address: 1401 N Lincoln Blvd. Oklahoma City, Oklahoma 73104
- Coordinates: 35.4826°N 97.5040°W
- Website: www.ocpathink.org

The Oklahoma Council of Public Affairs (OCPA) is a conservative, state-based think tank in Oklahoma, US.

== Founding, mission, and leadership ==
The Oklahoma Council of Public Affairs (OCPA) was founded in 1993 as a public policy research organization focused primarily on state-level issues. The founders, led by Dr. David Brown, envisioned an organization that was capable of affecting the state's public policy similar to national level think tanks. Since its founding, OCPA has conducted research and analysis of public issues in Oklahoma from a perspective of limited government, individual liberty and a free-market economy.

The group was founded following a meeting arranged by Tony Wyman, a Republican political staffer working in the Bill Price 5th District congressional primary campaign and the George H. W. Bush re-election campaign, who brought a representative from Iowans for Tax Relief to meet with local business and political leaders in the board room of Phillips Petroleum Company in Bartlesville, Oklahoma, in 1992.

OCPA's headquarters are near the Oklahoma State Capitol in Oklahoma City. Jonathan Small serves as the organization's president.

A Ten Commandments outdoor monument tablet was installed at OCPA headquarters in 2015. The monument had been removed from the Oklahoma State Capitol as a reaction to an activist group's attempt to install a Satanic monument alongside the tablet.

== See also ==
- State Policy Network
