= Ten Commandments Monument (Nigeria) =

2021 stone monument in Dwoi, Plateau State, Nigeria

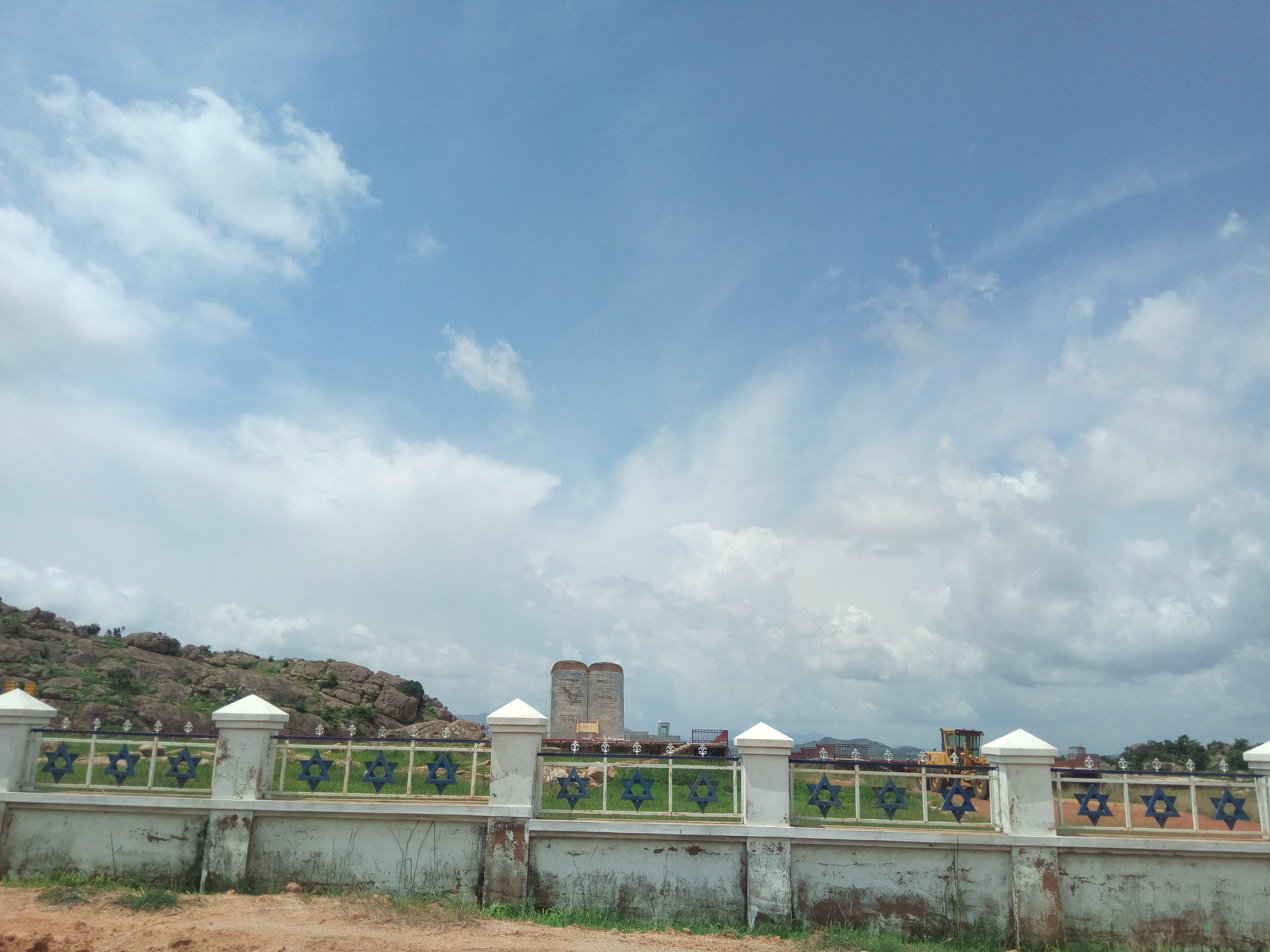
- The monument in 2017
- Interactive map of Ten Commandments Monument
- Location: Dwoi, Jos South, Plateau State, Nigeria
- Coordinates: 09°49′14.1″N 08°55′29″E
- Designer: Unknown
- Type: Monument
- Dedicated date: 2021

The Ten Commandments Monument is installed on the New Jerusalem compound, in Dwoi (also spelled Doi), Jos South, Plateau State, Nigeria. It was erected before 2017 but formally dedicated in December 2021, with an altar and an open-air amphitheater with a capacity for 5,800 people. Senator and former Plateau State governor Jonah Jang funded its construction through the Yeshua Kingdom Foundation International.

Its dedication was attended by former president of Nigeria Goodluck Jonathan. This ceremony created tensions within the Plateau State government.

Concerts have been hosted at the monument, for instance the "One More Soul" concert organized in April 2023 with Northern Nigeria gospel artists such as Panam Percy Paul and Jeremiah Gyang. In June 2023, Nigerian rapper Vector released the song "Why Me", with a video clip shot at the Ten Commandments Monument.

The monument is 25 ft. high and is the largest among existing Ten Commandments Monuments in Africa. The facility is managed by proceeds from renting out the space to users who might want to organize religious prayers. The state government also, from time to time give grants for the upkeep of the facility.

== See also ==
- Ten Commandments Monument (Little Rock, Arkansas)
- Ten Commandments Monument (Oklahoma City)
- Ten Commandments Monument (Austin, Texas)
