= Statue of Baphomet =

Sculpture commissioned by the Satanic Temple

- The statue of Baphomet unveiled in Detroit, Michigan
- Artist: Mark Porter
- Year: 2015
- Medium: bronze
- Subject: Baphomet
- Dimensions: 260 cm × 141 cm × 118 cm (102 in × 55.5 in × 46.5 in)
- Weight: 3,000 pounds (1,400 kg)
- Location: Salem, Massachusetts
- Website: Salem Art Gallery

The statue of Baphomet is a monumental bronze sculpture commissioned by the Satanic Temple, first unveiled in 2015. The statue has figured in public challenges against the display of the Ten Commandments at two U.S. state capitols.

Depicting Baphomet, a goat-headed, angel-winged humanoid symbol of the occult, the statue stands 8.5 feet (2.6 m) tall, weighing over 3,000 lb (1,400 kg), and includes a prominent pentagram as well as two smiling youths gazing up at the seated central figure. Petitions to display the statue on public grounds have resulted in arguments concerning religious equality and the validity of satirical elements as part of new religious movements. Production of the statue, and its initial notoriety, is featured in the 2019 Hail Satan? documentary.

== Origins ==
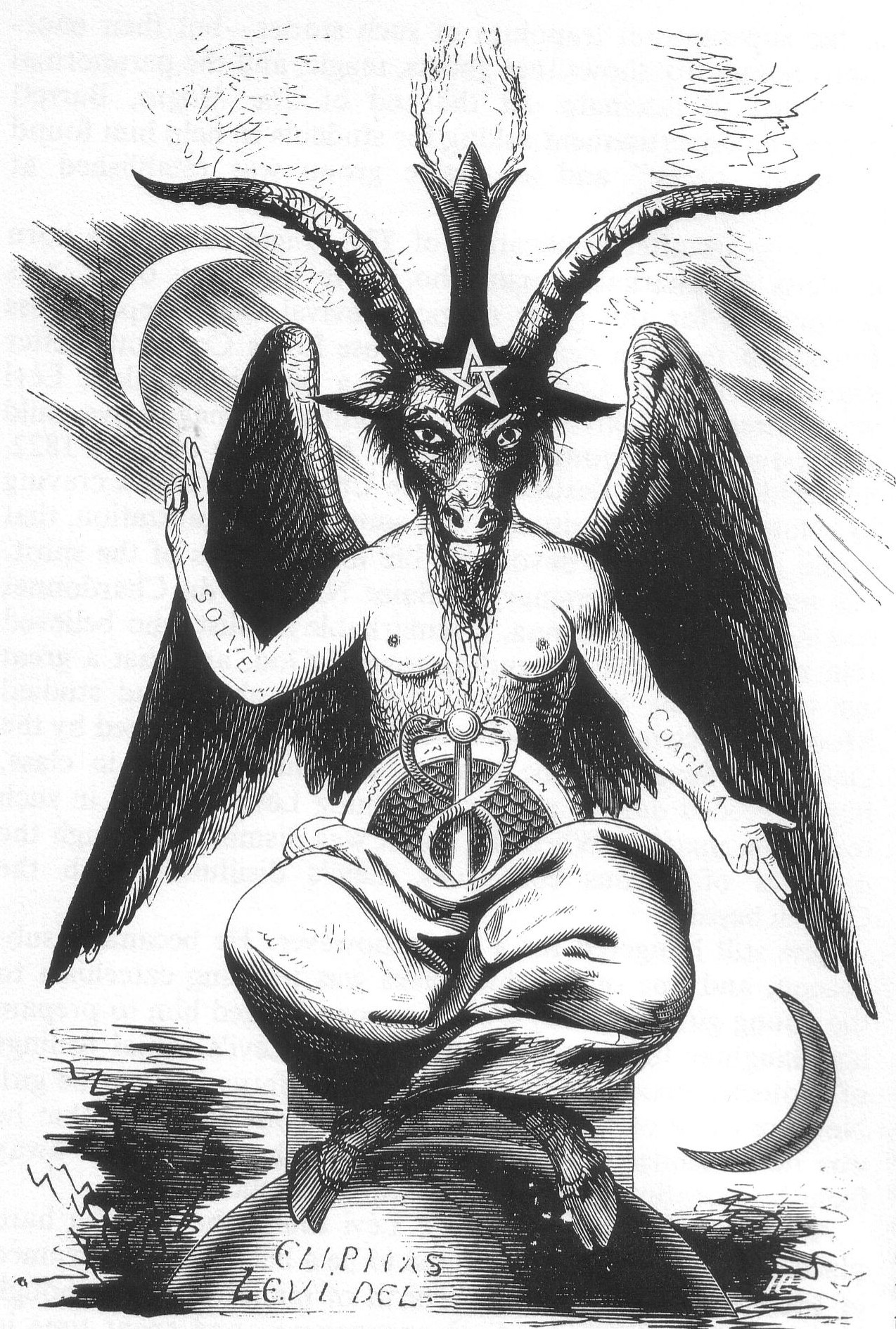
The 1856 illustration of Baphomet by Éliphas Lévi served as a visual reference for the statue.

The Satanic Temple began an Indiegogo crowdfunding campaign in 2014 to create a satanic monument depicting Baphomet and two children, with the intention to display this monument at the Oklahoma State Capitol. The group's fundraising efforts aimed at erecting the statue in response to the Ten Commandments Monument installed by Oklahoma State Representative Mike Ritze in 2012. Artist Mark Porter created the sculpture in Florida using the Éliphas Lévi illustration as his basis.

== Public unveiling ==
The piece was first seen publicly on 25 July 2015 at an event organized by the Detroit chapter of The Satanic Temple, amidst protests by religious organizations. The 700 attendees at the unveiling ceremony had to "sell their souls to Satan" in order to receive a ticket, a tactic that the Temple stated was done in order to "keep away some of the more radical superstitious people who would try to undermine the event."

Time noted that "the group does not 'promote a belief in a personal Satan.' By their logic, Satan is an abstraction, ... 'a literary figure, not a deity — he stands for rationality, for skepticism, for speaking truth to power, even at great personal cost.' Time also commented on the statue's unveiling, writing "Call it Libertarian Gothic, maybe — some darker permutation of Ayn Rand's crusade for free will. One witnesses in The Satanic Temple militia a certain knee-jerk reaction to encroachments upon personal liberties, especially when those encroachments come with a crucifix in hand. The Baphomet statue is the Satanic Temple's defiant retort du jour."

== State Capitol grounds ==
=== Oklahoma ===
In 2012, Oklahoma Rep. Mike Ritze, a Republican politician from Tulsa, privately commissioned a Ten Commandments Monument for the Oklahoma State Capitol in Oklahoma City after a previous court ruling dictated that religious monuments may not be paid for with public tax dollars under the Oklahoma state constitution, which forbids the state from endorsing a specific religion. In January 2014, the Satanic Temple announced plans to also crowdfund and privately commission a 7-to-9-foot-tall bronze statue of Baphomet to be displayed alongside the Christian monument, both statues being legally classified as "donations".

The Satanic Temple ultimately raised over $28,000 to finance and build the statue of Baphomet.

In July 2015, after the litigation of Prescott v. Oklahoma Capitol Preservation Commission concluded with an Oklahoma Supreme Court order to remove the Ten Commandments monument, as it violated Article 2, Section 5 of the Oklahoma state constitution, the Satanic Temple withdrew their request to display Baphomet on public property. As the statue was completed in Detroit, Michigan just days prior, but had yet to be transported to Oklahoma City, the Satanic Temple also announced plans to install the statue of Baphomet elsewhere.

Doug Mesner (or Lucien Greaves), a representative for the Satanic Temple, stated the following: "The entire point of our effort was to offer a monument that would complement and contrast the Ten Commandments, reaffirming that we live in a nation that respects plurality, a nation that refuses to allow a single viewpoint to co-opt the power and authority of government institutions. Given the Court's ruling, the Satanic Temple no longer has any interest in pursuing placement of the Baphomet monument on Oklahoma's Capitol grounds. Arkansas is looking appealing...there are plenty of areas in the United States crying out for a counter-balance to existing graven tributes to archaic Abrahamic barbarism."

After failed attempts by Republican lawmakers, including Governor of Oklahoma Mary Fallin, to appeal the Oklahoma Supreme Court ruling and keep the Ten Commandments monument at the State Capitol, it was relocated in October 2015 to the front lawn of the Oklahoma Council of Public Affairs building on private property. Removing the statue cost the state $4,700.

In 2016, the Satanic Temple opposed State Question 790, a proposed revision to the Oklahoma state constitution that, if passed by voters, would allow the use of public land and taxpayer funds for religious purposes, including financing religious monuments. The measure was defeated.

On 27 April 2018, Arkansas State Sen. Jason Rapert installed a Ten Commandments monument at the Arkansas State Capitol that he had privately financed and commissioned. Shortly after, in May 2018, the Oklahoma Legislature passed a bill (HB 2177), introduced by State Representative John R. Bennett, labelling the Ten Commandments as a "historically significant document", in an attempt to reinstall the Ten Commandments monument on the grounds of the State Capitol. Bennett disputed the 2015 Oklahoma Supreme Court ruling, arguing that "displaying the Ten Commandments does not advocate for religion". State Sen. Micheal Bergstrom proposed that the Ten Commandments monument could be displayed "with other historical documents" on the same public property, including the Constitution of the United States and the United States Declaration of Independence. The proposed law also required the Oklahoma attorney general to defend legal challenges to display of the Ten Commandments monument in court.

The bill was signed into law by Governor of Oklahoma Mary Fallin, who agreed with Bennett, saying, "[The new law] doesn't order their display. Displaying the Ten Commandments on public property celebrates the historical values that have helped shape our legal system. It is not a state endorsement of any religion, and it certainly does not threaten anyone's rights to worship as they choose, or not to worship at all."

On 30 January 2024, Oklahoma Sen. David Bullard filed a bill (SB 1858) to "prominently display and protect" a new version of the Ten Commandments Monument at the Oklahoma State Capitol. Bullard claimed that the monument had "historic significance" to the history of both Oklahoma and the United States. If passed, the bill would authorize the Oklahoma Legislature and the Governor of Oklahoma to design, place, secure, and construct the monument, while complying with previous court rulings that only donated funds may be used in its construction. The proposed law also specified that any acts of vandalism against the new Ten Commandments monument would constitute a felony.

Bullard stated his reasoning for introducing the bill as follows: "There has actually been change in a lot of case law, most specifically the Kennedy v. Bremerton School District U.S. Supreme Court case from 2022, which now establishes that the only test we have, [as] the lemon test no longer exists. The only test that we have when it comes to Establishment Clause basis is...'Is what we're doing have to do with our history?' If it does, then it's permissible, and the Ten Commandments are all through our history." In response to protests by the Satanic Temple and other civil rights groups, such as the American Civil Liberties Union (ACLU), Bullard responded, "[These groups] do not speak for the majority of Oklahomans who want to honor our Christian and constitutional heritage."

The same argument had been used against the Satanic Temple's petition to erect a statute of Baphomet at the Oklahoma State Capitol in 2014 by Oklahoma State Representative Paul Wesselhöft, who stated, "[Baphomet has no] historical significance for the State of Oklahoma...the only reason why the Ten Commandments [monument] qualified is because, at the Capitol, what we do is we make laws. We are lawmakers. Well, one of the earliest laws we have are the Ten Commandments."

However, Mesner (Greaves) disputed this on behalf of the Satanic Temple, saying, "The idea that the Ten Commandments are foundational to United States law or Oklahoman law is absurd and obscene. [Our monument] celebrates our progress as a pluralistic nation founded on secular law. I would argue that the message behind our [Baphomet] monument speaks more directly to the formation of U.S. constitutional values than the Ten Commandments possibly could. It especially does so when it stands directly beside the Ten Commandments, as it affirms no one religion enjoys legal preference."

On 1 March 2024, SB 1858 failed to make the committee deadline in the Oklahoma Legislature, and was shelved.

=== Arkansas ===
The statue was displayed on a flatbed truck parked in front of the Arkansas State Capitol building for several hours on 16 August 2018 for an event organized in protest of the Ten Commandments Monument on the Arkansas Capitol grounds. After a formal request to install Baphomet was refused, Satanic Temple members were granted legal standing to challenge the Ten Commandments monument. Litigation of the consolidated case Cave et al. v. Thurston continued into the summer of 2023.

In October 2023, U.S. District Judge Kristine Baker requested additional briefs from attorneys on both sides of the lawsuit. Judge Baker questioned whether the monument violated the Arkansas Constitution's provision dealing with the separation of church and state, and suggested that the Arkansas Supreme Court should rule on the state constitutional question before proceeding with federal questions regarding whether or not the Ten Commandments monument violated the First Amendment of the U.S. Constitution. Baker ruled in March 2026 that legislators' decision to block the Baphomet statue was discriminatory.

== Related displays ==
=== Florida ===
In December 2013, the Satanic Temple petitioned the State of Florida to install a display of Baphomet, Satan, or Lucifer at the Florida State Capitol in Tallahassee during the Christmas season, but their request was denied by the Florida Department of Management Services (FDMS) on the basis of being "grossly offensive". The proposed display, this time a joint venture by American Atheists and the Satanic Temple, was accepted in 2014, after the Satanic Temple and other civil rights groups threatened to sue.

However, 55-year-old Susan Hemeryck destroyed the display on 22 December 2014; while Hemeryck was initially charged with vandalism, Florida Attorney General Pam Bondi dropped all charges on 22 March 2015.

=== Iowa ===
The Baphomet display erected by the Satanic Temple in the Iowa State Capitol in December 2023, prior to its destruction by Michael Cassidy.

The local congregation of The Satanic Temple erected a Baphomet display in the Iowa State Capitol in December 2023, only for it to be destroyed on 14 December by Michael Cassidy, a 35-year-old candidate for the Mississippi House of Representatives and a Christian conservative from Lauderdale, Mississippi. Cassidy, who read about the display on social media, went to the Capitol to destroy it, stating his reasoning for vandalizing the statue: "I grew up in a country that was founded on Christian principles, and in America, that generally promoted good ethics and public displays of virtue. The evil display and the lack of action surprised and offended me as a Christian. People need to stand up for what is right. Satan is evil, and glorifying evil is not an American value." Cassidy also stated that The Satanic Temple "needed Jesus", and sought to evangelize adherents. Cassidy further stated, "I saw this blasphemous statue, and was outraged. My conscience is held captive to the word of God, not to bureaucratic decree, and so I acted."

Cassidy was later charged with fourth degree criminal mischief after the Satanic Temple pressed charges; if found guilty, he will face a maximum penalty of one year in prison, and a $2,560 USD fine. He was later charged with a hate crime under Iowa's list of misdemeanors.

A crowdfunding campaign for Cassidy's legal defense fund raised $20,000 within three hours, $10,000 of which was donated by conservative campaign group Turning Point USA. Overall, the campaign raised over $75,000 for Cassidy's legal defense.

Attorney and retired U.S. Air Force lieutenant colonel Davis Younts agreed to represent Cassidy in court. Younts stated, "My client [Michael Cassidy] was motivated by his Christian faith to peacefully protest a display that is a direct affront to God. When others, including elected leaders, were unwilling to act, he peacefully removed the display. It is my hope that the citation will be dismissed when my client's actions are understood, and that he will not face prosecution because of his Christian faith."

Kim Reynolds, the Governor of Iowa, released a statement on 12 December 2023, just two days before Cassidy destroyed the Baphomet display: "Like many Iowans, I find the Satanic Temple's display in the Capitol absolutely objectionable. In a free society, the best response to objectionable speech is more speech, and I encourage all those of faith to join me today in praying over the Capitol, and recognizing the nativity scene that will be on display – the true reason for the season."

Republican Iowa State Representative Jon Dunwell, an ordained minister, stated on Twitter/X: "I certainly find a display from the Satanic Temple objectionable. It stands in direct opposition to my faith, and would be classified as evil...[however], in fairness, many other religions or nonreligious people have the same perspective about Christianity...[and] I don't want the state evaluating and making determinations about religions. I am guided by the First Amendment of the U.S. Constitution."

Republican Iowa State Representative and pastor Brad Sherman disagreed with Dunwell, calling the Baphomet display "disgusting", and arguing that the display was a violation of the Iowa State Constitution. Sherman stated, "The Iowa Constitution is the supreme law of the State of Iowa, and it establishes the legal foundation upon which all other state laws are built...it is a tortured and twisted interpretation of law that affords Satan, who is universally understood to be the enemy of God, religious expression equal to God in an institution of government that depends upon God for continued blessings. Such a legal view...violates the very foundation of our State Constitution." Sherman also argued against the separation of church and state in the First Amendment of the U.S. Constitution, and in favor of Christian nationalism.

== References in popular culture ==
The Satanic Temple sued Netflix in November 2018 over usage of a likeness of the statue in Chilling Adventures of Sabrina. The case was settled out of court for an undisclosed sum, and the Satanic Temple was given credit for the statue in future broadcasts.

== See also ==
- 2015 in art
- Sigil of Baphomet
