= Ten Commandments Monument (Oklahoma City) =

Monument in Oklahoma City, Oklahoma, U.S.

- Interactive map of Ten Commandments Monument
- Location: Oklahoma City
- Coordinates: 35.49145°N 97.50355°W
- Type: Monument
- Material: South Dakota granite
- Height: 6 foot
- Opening date: 2012

The Ten Commandments Monument, authorized by the Oklahoma legislature and approved by the governor in 2009, was installed on the grounds of the Oklahoma State Capitol, in Oklahoma City, in 2012. The mere concept engendered years of political controversy, court suits based on freedom of religion issues, destruction in 2014 by a man who drove his car into it, replacement in the same location, and even attempts to remove Supreme Court justices who ruled in 2014 that the monument must be removed to another site. After Governor Mary Fallin, key legislators, and the justices agreed on a substitute site, the monument was removed from the capitol grounds in 2015.

== History ==
In 2009, Oklahoma State Representative Mike Ritze sponsored a bill to have a monument to the Ten Commandments installed at the capitol. His family supplied $10,000 to fund the monument, which was installed in late 2012 after support by Oklahoma governor Mary Fallin. The monument since has been labeled "a lightning rod of controversy". It has been destroyed and re-erected once and been the subject of both state and federal litigation.

=== Vandalism ===
In 2014, a man deliberately rammed the newly installed monument with a car, knocking it over and breaking the 6 foot (1.8 m) tall stone into several large pieces. He fled the scene but was subsequently arrested by the United States Secret Service after making threats to attack a federal building in Oklahoma City. An unidentified law enforcement officer told a local news broadcaster that the man said the devil made him commit the act.

The Oklahoma City vandal was subsequently identified as Michael Tate Reed of Van Buren, Arkansas.

Wilbert Memorials company made a replacement monument from South Dakota granite, added the design at its plant in Kansas and installed it at the Oklahoma capitol site on January 8, 2015.

A news report said that Reed had told police after the Oklahoma City attack that he was a Satanist, he had bipolar disorder, and that he was "off his meds" when he attacked the memorial. The report said that Reed was subsequently sent to a mental health facility for treatment. He was never charged with a crime.

In 2017, a similar Ten Commandments monument was demolished using the same modus operandi, less than 24 hours after it had been installed on the grounds of the Arkansas State Capitol in Little Rock, Arkansas. The perpetrator was arrested at the scene and gave police the name Michael Tate Reed. (Note: Reed described himself as “unemployed/disabled". He had posted on his Facebook page that he was "...a firm believer that part of salvation is that we not only have faith in Jesus Christ, but we obey the commands of God, and that we confess Jesus as Lord." Reed wrote on Facebook, "But one thing I do not support is the violation of our Constitutional right to have the freedom that's guaranteed to us, that guarantees us the separation of church and state.") He was later confirmed to be the same man who attacked the Oklahoma City monument. Reed even videotaped the attack on Facebook. Reed, who has bipolar disorder, borderline personality disorder, and histrionic personality disorder, was acquitted on mental health grounds.

=== Prescott v. Capitol Preservation Commission ===
Oklahoma citizens Bruce Prescott, James Huff and Cheryl Huff, filed suit in a state court over the placement of the Ten Commandments religious monument on public property. The defendant was the Capitol Preservation Commission, which had given permission for the action. Even though no public (tax) money had been spent on the monument, the plaintiffs argued that using public ground was also a violation of Article II, Section 5 of the Oklahoma Constitution. The lower court, using a different interpretation of the Constitution's language decided in favor of the defendant (the commission), and allowed the monument to be established on the capitol grounds. The passage that served as the crux of the argument between the two sides is quoted here:

No public money or property shall ever be appropriated, applied, donated, or used, directly or indirectly, for the use, benefit, or support of any sect, church, denomination, or system of religion, or for the use, benefit, or support of any priest, preacher, minister, or other religious teacher or dignitary, or sectarian institution as such.

The plaintiffs appealed the decision to the Oklahoma Supreme Court. The American Civil Liberties Union of Oklahoma (ACLU), acting on behalf of the original plaintiffs, entered the case and furnished attorneys to help with the appeal.

The defense team, whose aim was to restore the monument to the capitol grounds, was led by E. Scott Pruitt, then the Attorney General of the State of Oklahoma, assisted by two other attorneys from his office. (Note: Pruitt, a career Republican politician, and strongly religious conservative) is probably best known for his opposition to environmental regulations. As of early 2017 he was Administrator of the U.S. Environmental Protection Agency, following his appointment by President Donald Trump.) Pruitt asserted that the Oklahoma Constitution did not apply, largely because no state money was used to buy or install the monument.

The case, Prescott v. Capitol Preservation Commission, was ultimately decided by the Oklahoma Supreme Court in June 2015, holding in a 7–2 decision that the monument violates the Oklahoma Constitution's ban on the use of public property to support religion. (Note: Justices who concurred with the majority opinion were Chief Justice John F. Reif, Yvonne Kauger, Joseph Watt, James Winchester, James Edmondson, Steven W. Taylor and Noma Gurich. Justices who dissented were Doug Combs and Tom Colbert. Justice Winchester wrote the majority opinion.) The decision has proved extremely controversial, with some conservative state lawmakers even calling for impeachment of the Oklahoma Supreme Court and/or amending of the Oklahoma Constitution to remove its ban on state religious support. The monument was removed from the Capitol grounds in October 2015. (Note: Bruce Prescott, a Baptist minister, said "Frankly, I'm glad we finally got the governor and attorney general to agree to let the monument be moved to private property, which is where I believe it's most appropriate... I'm not opposed to the Ten Commandments. The first sermon I ever preached was on the Ten Commandments. I'm just opposed to it being on public property.")

=== Actions by other opposition groups ===
A second lawsuit was filed by American Atheists in 2013, this time in federal court, alleging that the monument also violated the First Amendment's Establishment Clause. The suit was dismissed by the Federal District Court for lack of standing, and Prescott v. Capitol Preservation Commission was decided while an appeal was pending, likely rendering the case moot.

Prior to the Prescott decision, the New York-based Satanic Temple, citing the government's constitutional obligation to not endorse any particular religion, had announced they would apply to have a privately funded statue honoring Baphomet on the capitol grounds. A vandal destroyed the Ten Commandments monument in 2014 and plans for the Baphomet statue were put on hold, as the Satanic Temple did not want their statue to stand alone at the capitol. After the Oklahoma Supreme Court ordered the monument removed, the statue was unveiled elsewhere in Detroit and is now on public display at Salem Art Gallery in Salem, MA. The statue may be moved to Arkansas if a Ten Commandments monument is erected there. (Note: Arkansas did install a nearly identical Ten Commandments monument on its capitol grounds in Little Rock on June 27, 2017. On the next day, Michael Tate Reid drove a 2016 Dodge Dart automobile into the monument, breaking it into at least three pieces. Reed also made a video of the crash and posted it to his Facebook page, to publicize his actions.)

=== Monument relocation ===
The controversial monument was removed from the capitol grounds during the night of October 7, 2015. A portable crane delivered it to the property of a private conservative think tank, the Oklahoma Council of Public Affairs, about 10 blocks away. This may be only a temporary solution. The next day, Governor Fallin called for a constitutional amendment to allow the Ten Commandments to return to the capitol. "The people of Oklahoma should be able to vote on whether to bring the Ten Commandments monument back to the Capitol."

=== Subsequent proceedings ===
A November 2016 ballot initiative, known as State Question 790, proposed repealing the section of the Oklahoma Constitution that prohibits using state resources to promote particular religious views. Voters defeated the measure: 809,254 (57.12%) to 607,482 (42.88%).

Undeterred by voter opinion, Rep. John R. Bennett and Sen. Micheal Bergstrom authored House Bill 2177, allowing "cities, schools and municipalities to display 'historical documents, monuments and writings' in public buildings and on public grounds." (Note: HB 2177 specifically authorizes display of the following documents on public property: the Magna Carta, Mayflower Compact, Declaration of Independence, United States Constitution, Bill of Rights, Oklahoma Constitution, and the Ten Commandments.) Governor Fallin signed the bill in May 2018.

== See also ==
- Prescott v. Oklahoma Capitol Preservation Commission (2015)
- Ten Commandments Monument (Austin, Texas)
- Ten Commandments Monument (Little Rock, Arkansas)
- Van Orden v. Perry (2005)
