= Susan Winchester =

American politician

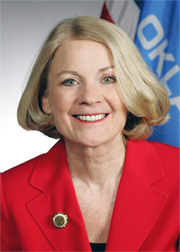
- Winchester's official house portrait

Oklahoma Secretary of Licensing and Regulation
- Incumbent
- Assumed office February 2021
- Governor: Kevin Stitt
- Preceded by: Position established

Speaker pro tempore of the Oklahoma House of Representatives
- In office 2005–2008
- Preceded by: Danny Hilliard
- Succeeded by: Gus Blackwell

Member of the Oklahoma House of Representatives from the 47th district
- In office 1998–2008
- Preceded by: Dan Ramsey
- Succeeded by: Leslie Osborn

Personal details
- Born: Chickasha, Oklahoma
- Party: Republican
- Spouse: James R. Winchester
- Education: University of Oklahoma

Susan Winchester is an American politician who has served as the Oklahoma Secretary of Licensing and Regulation in the administration of Governor Kevin Stitt since 2021. She previously served in the Oklahoma House of Representatives representing the 47th from 1998 to 2008.

She was elected Whip for the Republican Caucus after her first term, and in 2005 became the first woman to serve as Speaker Pro Tempore, the second highest position in the House.

== Biography ==
Susan Winchester, born in Chickasha, Oklahoma, earned her bachelor's and master's degrees at the University of Oklahoma. Winchester co-owned and operated American Dusting Company and Chickasha Flying Service from 1976 to 1989, after which she worked as a coordinator for Adult Training and Development at Canadian Valley Technology Center. In 1992 she started Winchester Group, an educational group that provides training and consulting to businesses.

== Political career ==
Winchester was elected to the Oklahoma House of Representatives in 1998 to succeed Dan Ramsey and served until 2008. During her time in office, she served as Chair of the Banking Subcommittee of the Economic Development and Financial Services Committee. In 2005 Winchester became the first female and only the second Republican to serve as Speaker Pro Tempore, the second highest position in the House, since statehood.

In 2003 Winchester was chosen as Legislator of the Year by the Oklahoma Economic Development Council, Independent Insurance Agents of Oklahoma and Community Action Councils of Oklahoma. In 2002 she was inducted into the Oklahoma Institute of Child Advocacy's Hall of Fame.

In February 2021, she was appointed the first Oklahoma Secretary of Licensing and Regulation by Governor Kevin Stitt. In 2023, she led the presidential search advisory committee for the University of Central Oklahoma and supported the hiring of her Todd Lamb.

Winchester currently resides in Chickasha, Oklahoma with her husband, Oklahoma Supreme Court Justice James R. Winchester, and their son.

== Community Involvement ==
Winchester is widely involved in a number of organizations, including:

- Leadership Oklahoma Class IX
- Oklahoma City National Memorial Board
- Memorial Institute for Prevention of Terrorism Board
- Oklahoma Fit Kids Coalition Board
- Oklahoma Academy for State Goals Board
- Leadership Chickasha
- Chickasha Chamber of Commerce
- Tuttle Chamber of Commerce
- Grady County Economic Development Council
- Oklahoma Foundation for Excellence Selection Committee
- University of Science and Arts of Oklahoma Board
- American Legislative Exchange Council
- Mustang Chamber of Commerce
- President of the Oklahoma Judicial Auxiliary Conference

== Awards and achievements ==
Winchester has been recognized for her achievements with numerous awards, including:

- Pathfinder Award given by the Research Institute for Economic Development (2002, 2005, 2006)
- Journal Record 2006 Women of the Year
- Kate Barnard Award given by the Oklahoma Association of Youth Services
- Citizen's Recognition Award given by the Oklahoma Library Association
- Legislator of the Year (Awarded by several groups)
- Inducted into the Oklahoma Institute for Child Advocacy Hall of Fame (2002)
