= James R. Winchester =

American judge (born 1952)

James Winchester

Justice of the Oklahoma Supreme Court
- Incumbent
- Assumed office January 4, 2000
- Appointed by: Frank Keating
- Preceded by: Alma Wilson

Chief Justice of the Oklahoma Supreme Court
- In office 2007–2009
- Preceded by: Joseph M. Watt
- Succeeded by: James E. Edmondson

Personal details
- Born: March 23, 1952 (age 74) Clinton, Oklahoma, U.S.
- Spouse: Susan Winchester
- Education: University of Oklahoma (BA); Oklahoma City University (JD)

James R. Winchester (born March 23, 1952) is an American lawyer and judge who has served as on the Oklahoma Supreme Court for district 5 since 2000. He had two-year terms as chief justice of the Supreme Court beginning in 2007 and 2017.

== Early life ==
Winchester was born in Clinton, Oklahoma, in 1952.

He received his Bachelor of Arts from the University of Oklahoma in 1974 and his Juris Doctor from the Oklahoma City University School of Law in 1977.

== Career ==
Winchester practiced law in Weatherford, Oklahoma, and Hinton, Oklahoma, before being named associate district judge for Caddo County, Oklahoma, in January 1983. In December 1983, at age 30, Winchester became one of the youngest district judges in the state when he was appointed as district judge for the Sixth Judicial District of Oklahoma. During his tenure as a district judge, he tried more than 200 jury trials, ranging from fraud to first-degree murder death-penalty cases.

Winchester was named Outstanding State Trial Court Judge by the Oklahoma Trial Lawyers Association in 1986 and was an executive board member of the Oklahoma Judicial Conference from 1992 to 1996. He was also president of the Oklahoma Judicial Conference in 1995. From August 1997 to January 2000, he was a United States administrative law judge with the U.S. Social Security Administration. While in these positions, he established the second in-state program for Children Coping With Divorce to assist children during difficult times.

=== Supreme Court ===
The governor of Oklahoma, Frank Keating, appointed Winchester to the Oklahoma Supreme Court on January 4, 2000, replacing the late justice, Alma Wilson, who had died during the previous year. He was named to District 5, which includes Carter, Cleveland, Garvin, Grady, Jefferson, Love, McClain and Stephens counties. In 2007, the eight other justices of the Oklahoma Supreme Court elected him to serve a two-year term as chief justice of Oklahoma.

Winchester was last re-elected to the same position in November 2016 by a large margin. According to the Norman Transcript, the tally was:

Yes	798,227	61.3%
No	503,437	38.7%

In November 2022, Oklahomans voted to retain him for another six years with more than 60% of the vote.

== Controversial judgments ==
Justice Winchester has angered some in the Oklahoma political establishment by his judgements on certain issues:

=== Restricting Internet access to Supreme Court records ===
During Winchester's term as chief justice, the court issued a new rule that restricted public internet access to Supreme Court documents. The only exception was to allow access to dockets, and parties to the case were required to redact personal information before the document could be released. The justification was to balance the right of privacy of individuals against the right of public access. Winchester and four associate justices signed the order on March 11, 2008. The new rule was to take effect June 10, 2008.

Justice Yvonne Kauger wrote a separate opinion that partly concurred and partly dissented from the majority. She said that she disagreed with "... the instantaneous restriction of public access to current public court documents on line". In addition, she wrote:

The court made this decision with input only from the court clerks. Others directly affected by the decision - the bar, the bench, the Legislature, the public - were not consulted. . . . [A]s a result of this order, not only is the court taking a giant, 30-year leap backwards to a time when the personal computer was nonexistent, the public is now paying for access to a system which is made inaccessible by the order.

A post on the same blog from a reader named only as Don, said, "...Oklahoma Supreme Court has withdrawn its order restricting public access to court records." The post further explained that lawyers, free-speech advocates, law enforcement, court clerks, journalists and companies that perform background checks had all complained that the rules were too far-reaching. The office of the Chief Justice publicly announced that it was withdrawing the order to allow time for further study and consideration of the issue.

John M. Wylie of the Oologah Lake Leader was named as the March 2008 editorial winner by the Oklahoma Press Association (OPA) for a highly critical piece he wrote, even citing two provisions of the Oklahoma Constitution that Winchester and his colleagues allegedly violated in attempting to impose the order. He stated that these justices should be impeached if they did not reverse course and vacate the order. OPA posted the rebuke online for wider distribution.

=== Removal of the Ten Commandments Memorial ===
In a 2015 case, Prescott v. Oklahoma Capitol Preservation Commission, Winchester sided with a majority of the court, when the American Civil Liberties Union (ACLU) had sued to force the removal of a monument to the Ten Commandments from the Oklahoma Capitol building. The defense team, whose aim was to restore the monument to the capitol grounds, was led by E. Scott Pruitt, then the attorney general of the State of Oklahoma, assisted by two other attorneys from his office. (Note: Pruitt, a career Republican politician, and strong religious conservative) is probably best known for his opposition to environmental regulations. He is currently administrator of the U.S. Environmental Protection Agency, following his appointment by President Donald Trump in 2017.) The court majority ruled that the monument must be removed promptly because it violated Article 2, Section 5, of the Oklahoma Constitution, which says that (state) property cannot be used to promote a "church denomination or system of religion". Seven justices supported the plaintiff (ACLU) while two supported the state's position that there was no violation. (Note: Supporting were Justices Yvonne Kauger, Joseph M. Watt, James R. Winchester, James E. Edmondson, Steve W. Taylor, Noma D. Gurich and Chief Justice John F. Reif. Winchester wrote the majority opinion. Vice Chief Justice Douglas L. Combs and Justice Tom Colbert dissented.) Governor Mary Fallin claimed the court's ruling was erroneous and announced that she would not allow the removal while the state appealed the decision. Despite Fallin's statement, the Ten Commandments was removed from the capitol building in early October 2016.

After the verdict was announced, opposition groups that wanted the monument restored on the Capitol grounds announced their intention to recall the justices at the November 2016 general election. However, all nine justices won by wide margins, retaining their positions.

This case directly led to State Question 790, "Religion and the State" on the November 2016 ballot. The proposition was to repeal Article 2, Section 5 of the Oklahoma Constitution. The question was soundly defeated in the election. (Note: No = 809,254 (57.12%); Yes=607,482 (42.88%).)

=== Opioid judgement overruled ===
In 2018, the former Oklahoma attorney general, Michael Hunter, sued Johnson & Johnson Co. (J & J), a major pharmaceutical manufacturer, for its role in contributing to over 2,100 deaths from opioid-related overdoses between 2011 and 2015. Hunter requested $17.2 billion in damages. The initial trial apparently found J&J guilty, but reduced the damage award to $465 million. By 2022, the state had appealed the case to OSC, requesting an award of $9.3 billion, which it had intended to use in fighting the opioid crisis.]

In 2022, Justice Winchester wrote the majority opinion that overruled a $465 million ruling against Johnson & Johnson Co., saying that the lower court making the ruling had misinterpreted Oklahoma's public nuisance law. According to the OSC opinion, "The court has allowed public nuisance claims to address discrete, localized problems, not policy problems,” he wrote. “J&J had no control of its products through the multiple levels of distribution, including after it sold the opioids to distributors and wholesalers, which were then disbursed to pharmacies, hospitals, and physicians’ offices, and then prescribed by doctors to patients. The OSC ruling also said J&J had no control over how patients used the drugs, once the drugs had been given to them.”

== Personal life ==
Winchester currently lives in Chickasha, Oklahoma, with his wife, the former state representative Susan Winchester, and their son.

== See also ==
- Ten Commandments Monument (Oklahoma City)
