= Stan May =

American politician from Oklahoma (born 1959)

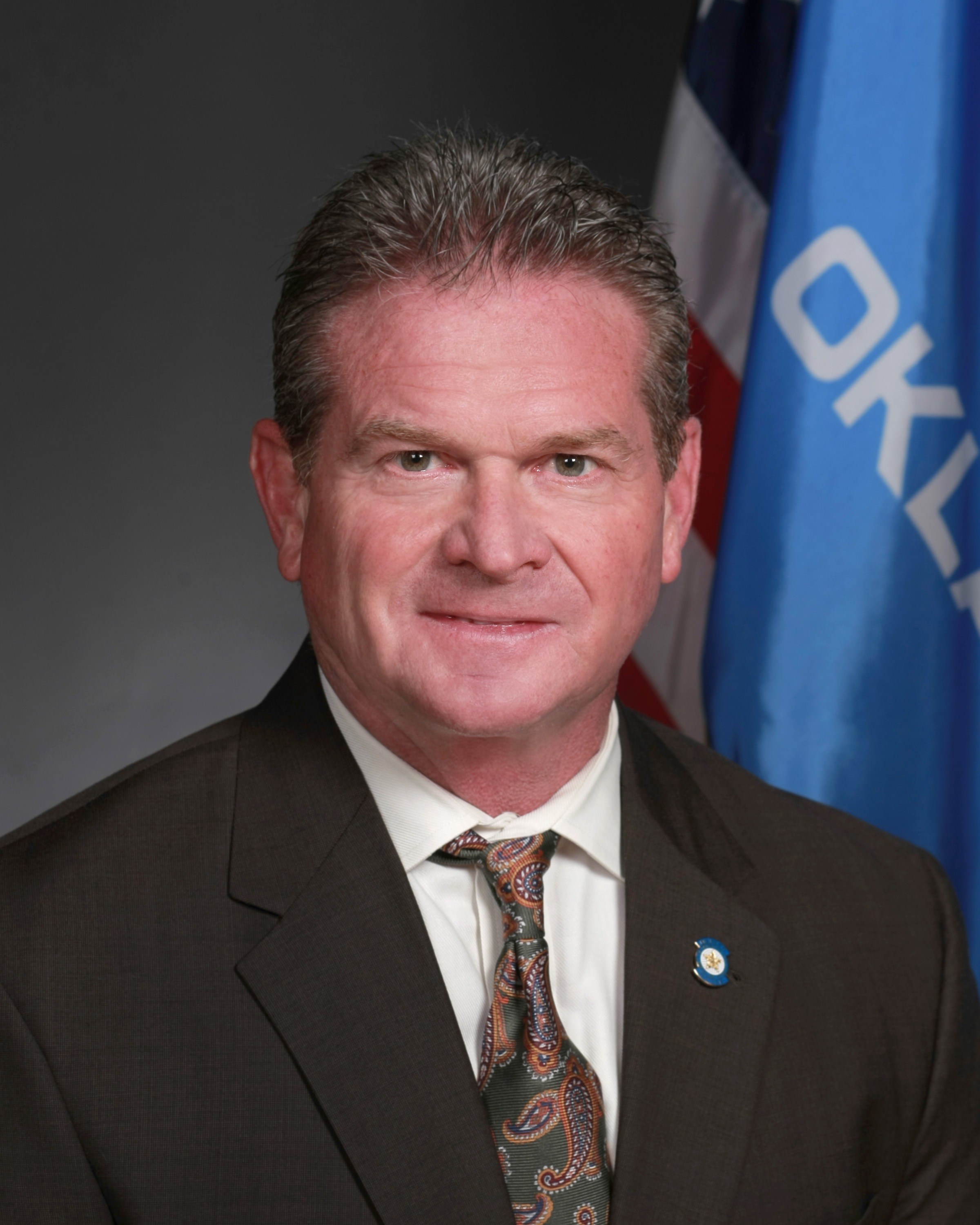

Member of the Oklahoma House of Representatives from the 80th district
- Incumbent
- Assumed office November 15, 2018
- Preceded by: Mike Ritze

Personal details
- Born: August 26, 1959 (age 67)
- Party: Republican

Stan May (born August 26, 1959) is an American politician who has served in the Oklahoma House of Representatives from the 80th district since 2018. He received his bachelor's degree in zoology from Truman State University and his DO degree from Kirksville College of Osteopathic Medicine. In 2020, he was re-elected by default.
