= Monument of Ten Commandments =

Complex in Ukraine

Coordinates: 47.9044°N 33.4108°E

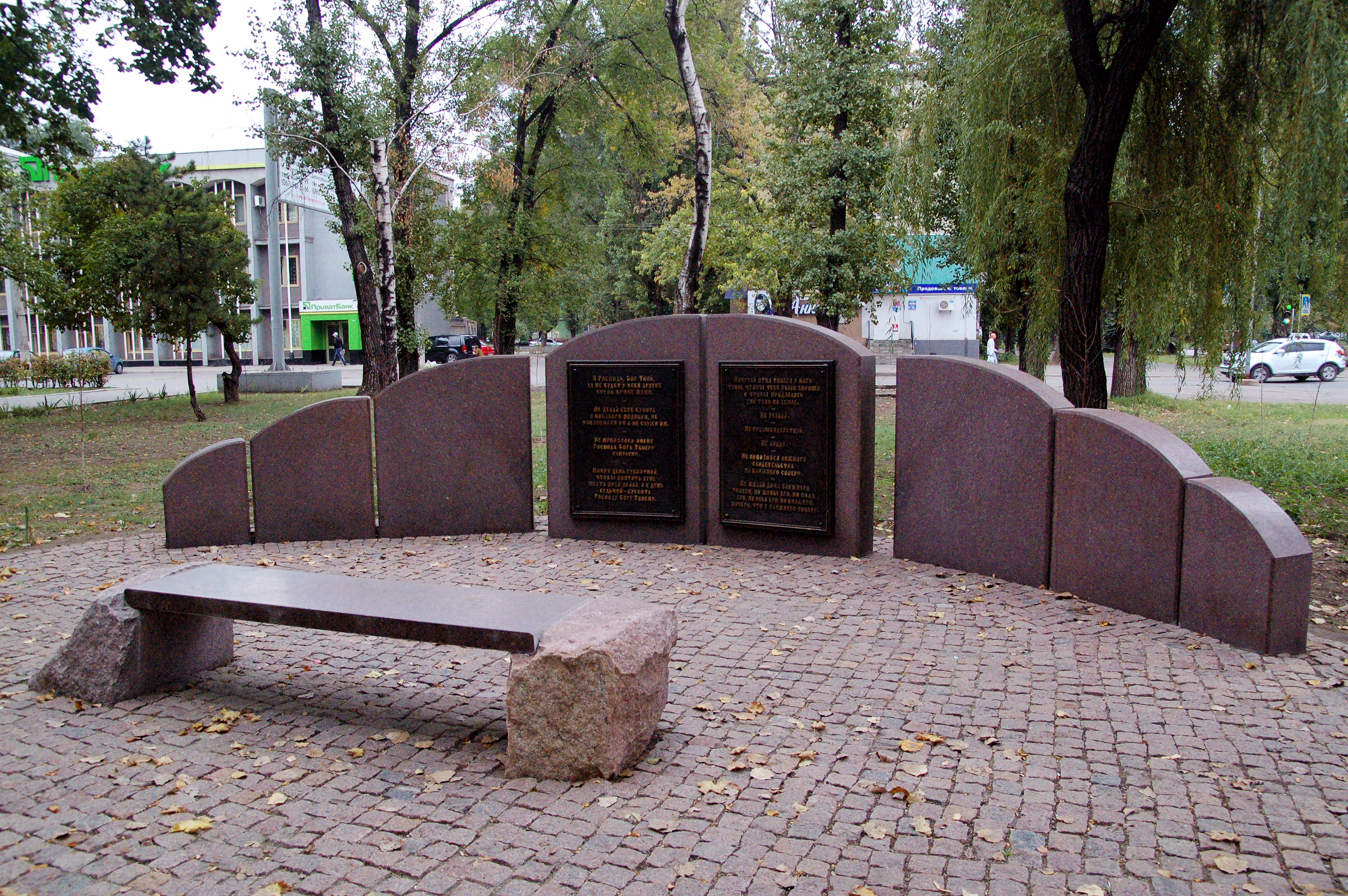
- Year: 2011
- Type: Sculpture
- Medium: Granit
- Location: Kryvyi Rih National University; Kryvyi Rih, Ukraine
- Accession: Free

The Monument of Ten Commandments is an architectural complex in Ukraine opened in honor of the 15th anniversary of the Kryvyi Rih Eparchy.

The complex is set in Dzerzhinsk area in the park near Technical University, at the intersection of Kostenko and XXII Partsezda Streets. The ensemble consists of 8 granite slabs in the form of clay tablets. Their size gradually and proportionally decreases from the center to the edges. Moses' Ten Commandments are inscribed on two central plates, arranged like an open book.
