= Mike Ritze =

American politician

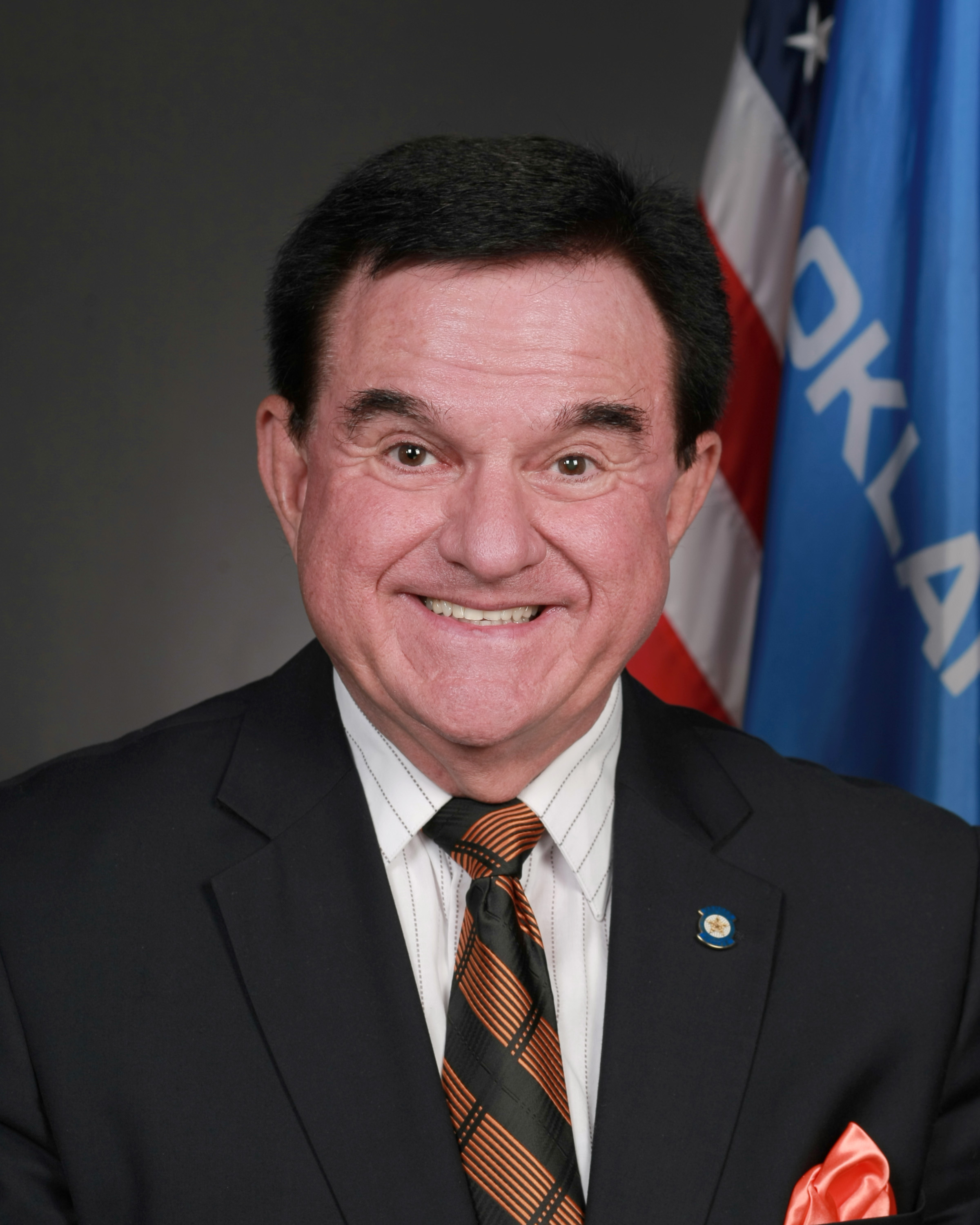

Member of the Oklahoma House of Representatives from the 80th district
- In office November 2008 – November 16, 2018
- Preceded by: Ron Peterson
- Succeeded by: Stan May

Personal details
- Born: October 16, 1948 (age 78) Trenton, Missouri
- Party: Republican
- Spouse: Connie Ritze
- Children: 4
- Education: Northeast Missouri State University (B.S.); Kirksville College of Osteopathic Medicine (D.O.)

Military service
- Allegiance: United States
- Branch/service: United States Army

James Michael Ritze (born October 16, 1948) is an American politician from the state of Oklahoma United States. A Republican, Ritze served as a member of the Oklahoma House of Representatives, representing the 80th district, which includes parts of Tulsa and Wagoner counties.

== Career ==
Ritze was first elected to the Oklahoma House of Representatives in 2008. He sponsored a bill in 2009 to have a monument to the Ten Commandments installed at the Oklahoma State Capitol. His family supplied $10,000 to fund the monument, which was installed in 2012.

On the night of Thursday, October 23, 2014, someone drove a vehicle across the Oklahoma State Capitol lawn and into the monument, shattering it. Police impounded the vehicle and started an investigation. A second copy of the monument has been made and erected to replace it.

In July 2015, the Oklahoma Supreme Court ruled that the re-erected monument must be removed because it violates the Oklahoma Constitution. The case was Prescott v. Oklahoma Capitol Preservation Commission.

Ritze has a hardline stance on immigration. In an interview with a local news reporter on May 10, 2017, Ritze (referring to 82,000 non-English speaking students in Oklahoma) suggested that the state "identify them and then turn them over to ICE to see if they truly are citizens" and then asked, "and do we really have to educate non-citizens?" The Washington Post noted that the 1982 U.S. Supreme Court decision Plyler v. Doe prohibits states from denying education based on immigration status.

In May 2018, Ritze was accused of embellishing his military record by claiming to have been injured in the line of duty.

Ritze was defeated in the primary election in August 2018.

== Personal life ==
Ritze is married to Connie Ritze, a registered nurse, with whom he has four children. He is a Sunday school teacher and an ordained deacon at Arrow Heights Baptist Church in Broken Arrow.
