= Ring of Honor (disambiguation) =

Ring of Honor (ROH) is an American professional wrestling promotion.

In professional wrestling, Ring of Honor may also refer to:

- Ring of Honor Wrestling, ROH's primary television show.

Ring of Honor may also refer to an honor given by several North American sports teams to notable members of the organization. Typically, the person's name would be permanently displayed on the facade of a stadium balcony. Individual teams with this honor include:

- Arizona Cardinals Ring of Honor
- Atlanta Falcons Ring of Honor
- Baltimore Ravens Ring of Honor
- Cincinnati Bengals Ring of Honor
- Cleveland Browns Ring of Honor
- Dallas Cowboys Ring of Honor
- Detroit Lions Ring of Honor – Referred to as the Pride of the Lions
- Denver Broncos Ring of Fame
- Gator Football Ring of Honor
- Houston Texans Ring of Honor
- Indianapolis Colts Ring of Honor
- Jacksonville Jaguars Ring of Honor - Referred to as the Pride of the Jaguars
- Minnesota Vikings Ring of Honor
- New Orleans Saints Ring of Honor
- New York Giants Ring of Honor
- New York Jets Ring of Honor
- Phoenix Suns Ring of Honor
- Los Angeles Chargers Hall of Fame
- Seattle Seahawks Ring of Honor
- St. Louis Football Ring of Fame
- Tampa Bay Buccaneers Ring of Honor
- Tennessee Titans Ring of Honor
- Vancouver Canucks Ring of Honour
- Washington Nationals Ring of Honor
- Washington Commanders Ring of Fame
