= Joseph M. Watt =

American judge

Justice of the Oklahoma Supreme Court
- In office May 18, 1992 – December 31, 2017
- Appointed by: David Walters
- Succeeded by: Richard Darby

Chief Justice of the Oklahoma Supreme Court
- In office January 8, 2003 – January 11, 2007
- Preceded by: Rudolph Hargrave
- Succeeded by: James R. Winchester

Personal details
- Born: March 8, 1947 (age 79) Austin, Texas
- Education: Texas Tech University, University of Texas School of Law

Joseph Michael Watt (born March 8, 1947) is a former Justice of the Oklahoma Supreme Court, who assumed the post in 1992. He was reelected in 1994, 1996, and 2002. From 2003 to 2007, he served two terms as Chief Justice. In 2005, he was reelected to an unprecedented second term as Chief Justice, despite a federal age discrimination lawsuit filed by the Court's then-Vice Chief Justice Marian P. Opala, then 83 years old, who claimed Supreme Court rules were changed to prevent Opala from becoming chief justice. Justice Watt sent a letter to Governor Mary Fallin on October 2, 2017, stating that he would retire from the Oklahoma Supreme Court effective December 31, 2017.

== Early life and education ==
Watt was born in Austin, Texas and graduated from Austin High School in 1965. In 1969, he earned a bachelor's degree majoring in history and government from Texas Tech University. He earned his J.D. from the University of Texas School of Law in 1972. In 1972, he was also named Outstanding Law Student in the Nation by the Delta Theta Phi Law Fraternity, and was elected to the University of Texas Circle of Omicron Delta Kappa National Honorary Leadership. After being admitted to practice law in both Oklahoma and Texas in 1973, he moved to Altus, Oklahoma, working in private practice until his appointment as the Altus city attorney in 1980, serving in that capacity until his appointment as a Special District Judge for Jackson County, Oklahoma in 1985. The following year, he was elected as an Associate Judge, serving in that capacity until 1991. From 1991 until Governor David Walters appointed him to the state Supreme Court the following year, he served as General Counsel in the Office of the Governor. During his tenure on the state supreme court, he served as justice for the 9th Judicial District covering Harmon, Greer, Kiowa, Caddo, Canadian, Comanche, Jackson, Tillman and Cotton counties. Voters re-elected him to the state supreme court in 1994, 1996 and 2002. He also served as Vice-Chief Justice in 2001 and 2002. His colleagues on the court elected him as chief justice for the 2003-2004 term, followed by a second consecutive term in 2005.

== Retirement ==
On October 2, 2017, Justice Watt sent a letter to Governor Mary Fallin announcing his intention to retire from active judicial service on December 31, 2017.

== Family ==
Little has been published about Watt's private life, except that he is married to Cathy Watt, and has four children, and three grandchildren.
