= Ten Commandments Monument (Little Rock, Arkansas) =

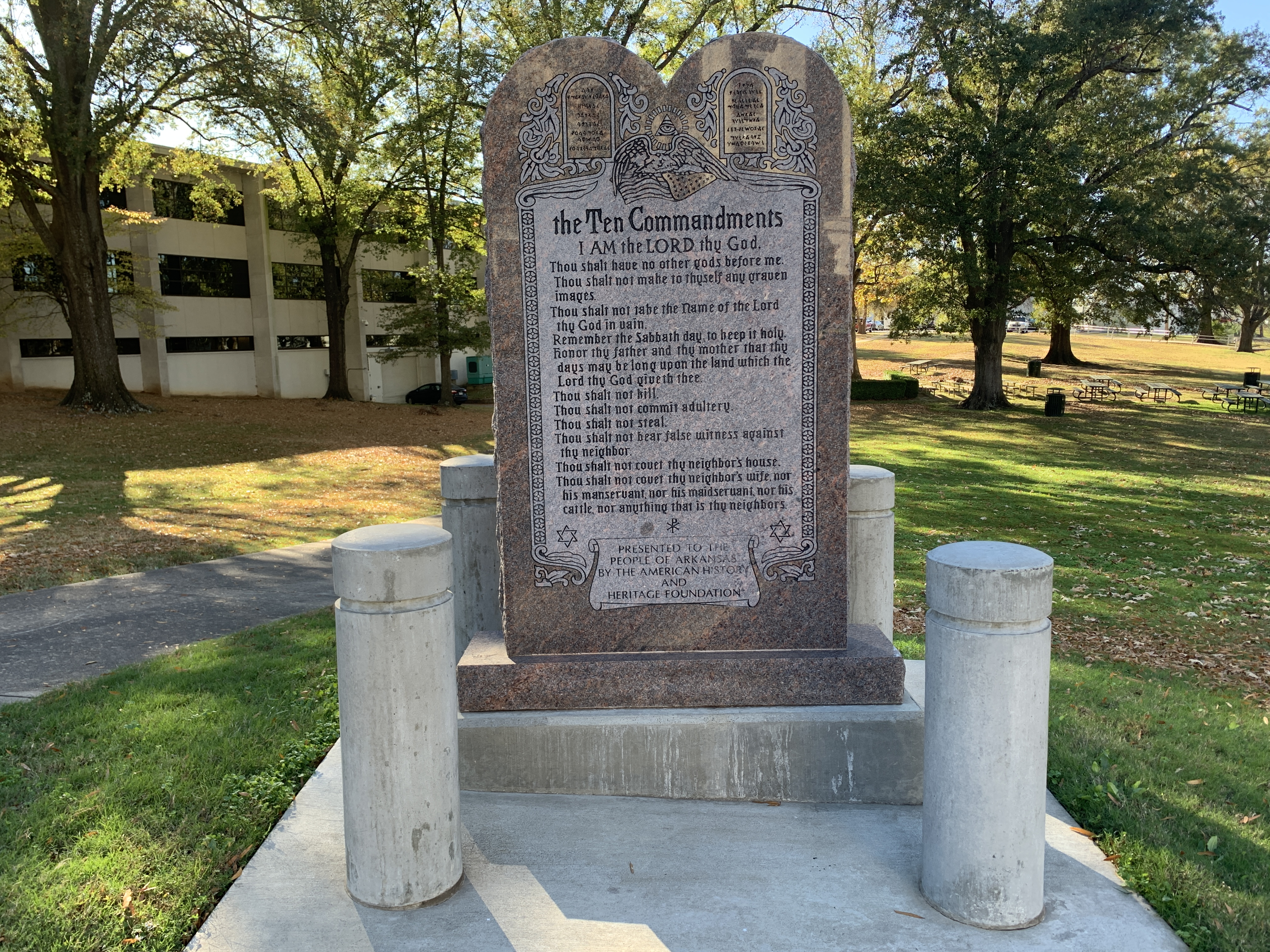
- Interactive map of Ten Commandments Monument
- Location: Little Rock, Arkansas
- Coordinates: 34°44′45.3″N 92°17′23.6″W
- Material: Granite
- Opening date: June 27, 2017
- Restored date: April 26, 2018

The Ten Commandments Monument is an outdoor monument installed on the Arkansas State Capitol grounds in Little Rock, Arkansas, in the United States. The monument is being challenged as unconstitutional by the American Civil Liberties Union (ACLU). The ACLU says that the monument demonstrates a religious preference, violating the First Amendment and the religious preference prohibition clause of the Arkansas State Constitution.

== Initial installation ==
The monument was erected on the Arkansas State Capitol grounds on June 27, 2017, then destroyed within 24 hours of its installation. The Freedom From Religion Foundation, which had criticized the erection of the Arkansas monument on public government property, also criticized the illegal destruction of the monument. In a news release, FFRF stated: "FFRF does not condone violating the Constitution by erecting a Ten Commandments monument on the Arkansas Capitol grounds. Nor do we condone breaking the law to remove such a display."

== Replacement and legal challenges ==
Following private fundraising from State Senator and Christian minister Jason Rapert, the monument was replaced on April 26, 2018. In protest against the monument, The Satanic Temple offered to donate a bronze sculpture of Baphomet as a symbol of religious pluralism and freedom. The statue of goat-headed Baphomet was blocked because of a 2017 Arkansas law that requires legislative sponsorship for consideration of any monument. According to the Satanic Temple, the state legislature's rejecting one monument while allowing the other demonstrates an illegal religious preference. The Satanic Temple briefly exhibited their statue at the Capitol on August 16, 2018. State senator Rapert told THV 11 news that he "respects everyone's right to free speech under the First Amendment." But, he continued, "It will be a very cold day in hell before an offensive statue will be forced upon us to be permanently erected on the grounds of the Arkansas State Capitol". After the request to install the Baphomet statue was refused, in an alleged violation of the Equal Protection Clause, Satanic Temple members were granted legal standing to challenge the Ten Commandments monument.

The monument is being challenged as unconstitutional by the American Civil Liberties Union. The ACLU says that the monument demonstrates a religious preference, violating the First Amendment and the religious preference prohibition clause of the Arkansas State Constitution. The Freedom from Religion Foundation, the American Humanist Association, and the Arkansas Society of Freethinkers are also involved in litigation to challenge the monument.

== See also ==
- Ten Commandments § United States debate over display on public property
- Ten Commandments Monument (Austin, Texas)
- Ten Commandments Monument (Oklahoma City)
- McCreary County v. American Civil Liberties Union (2005)
- Van Orden v. Perry (2005)
