= Ten Commandments Monument (Austin, Texas) =

1961 stone monument in Austin, Texas, U.S.

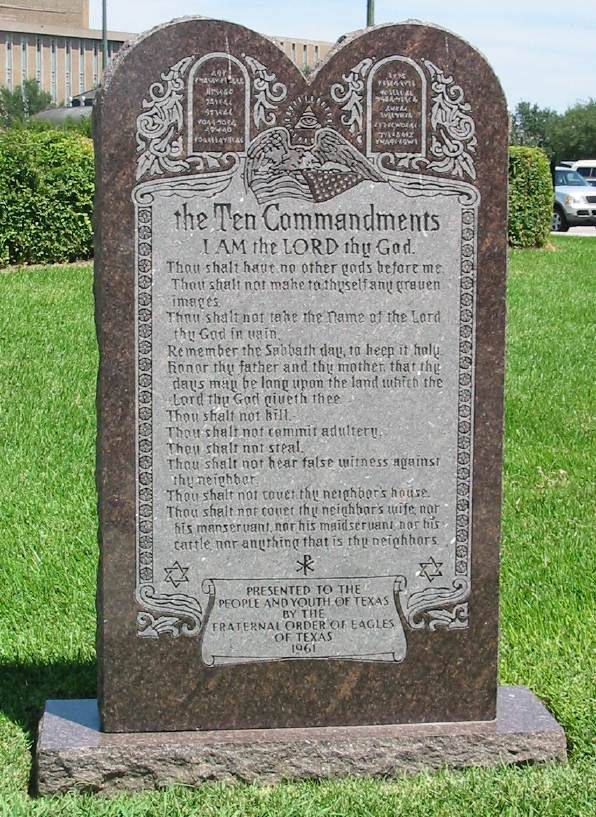
- The monument in 2002
- Interactive map of Ten Commandments Monument
- Location: Austin, Texas, U.S.
- Coordinates: 30°16′31.1″N 97°44′27″W
- Designer: Unknown
- Type: Monument
- Material: Texas Sunset Red Granite
- Opening date: 1961

The Ten Commandments Monument is installed on the Texas State Capitol grounds (behind the Capitol building) in Austin, Texas, United States. The Texas Sunset Red Granite artwork was designed by an unknown artist and erected by the Fraternal Order of Eagles of Texas in 1961. It was the subject of litigation in the Supreme Court case Van Orden v. Perry (2005).

== See also ==
- 1961 in art
- Ten Commandments Monument (Little Rock, Arkansas)
- Ten Commandments Monument (Oklahoma City)
