= James E. Edmondson =

American judge (born 1945)

James Edmondson

Justice of the Oklahoma Supreme Court
- Incumbent
- Assumed office December 3, 2003
- Appointed by: Brad Henry
- Preceded by: Hardy Summers

Chief Justice of the Oklahoma Supreme Court
- In office 2009–2010
- Preceded by: James R. Winchester
- Succeeded by: Steven W. Taylor

District Judge for Muskogee County, Oklahoma
- In office 1983 – December 3, 2003
- Preceded by: Hardy Summers
- Succeeded by: Thomas Alford

Personal details
- Born: March 7, 1945 (age 81) Kansas City, Missouri, U.S.
- Parent: Ed Edmondson (father)
- Relatives: Drew Edmondson (brother); J. Howard Edmondson (uncle)
- Education: Northeastern State University (BA); Georgetown University (JD)

James E. Edmondson (born March 7, 1945) is an American Judge who has served on the Oklahoma Supreme Court since his appointment to the Court's 7th district by Governor Brad Henry in 2003.

== Early life ==
James E. Edmondson was born in Kansas City, Missouri on March 7, 1945. He graduated from Central High School in Muskogee, Oklahoma, before attending Northeastern State University. Following graduation from NSU in 1967, he served in the United States Navy for two years. He earned his J.D. degree from Georgetown University Law Center in 1973. From 1976 to 1978, he served as an Assistant District Attorney in Muskogee County, Oklahoma. From 1978 to 1981, he served in the U.S. Attorney's office in Muskogee, Oklahoma, as an Assistant United States Attorney, and later Acting United States Attorney. From 1981 to 1983, he was a Partner in the Edmondson Law Firm along with his brother, Drew Edmondson.

== Judge ==
In 1983, Edmondson was appointed as a Judge for the 15th state Judicial District, based in Muskogee County, Oklahoma by Governor George Nigh. He won reelection and served in that post until his appointment to the Oklahoma Supreme Court.

Governor Brad Henry appointed Edmondson as an associate justice of the Oklahoma Supreme Court in 2003, replacing the retiring Justice Hardy Summers. Edmondson was retained on the court in the 2006 election, and served as chief justice from 2009 to 2010. He was retained on the court again in the 2016 election.

== Family ==
Edmondson is the son of former U.S. Congressman from Oklahoma Ed Edmondson, a nephew of former U.S. Senator and Oklahoma Governor J. Howard Edmondson, and the brother of former Oklahoma Attorney General Drew Edmondson.

He is married to Suzanne Rumler Edmondson and has two children. His daughter Sarah Edmondson was given a 35-year prison sentence and served 12 years for her role in a crime spree, allegedly inspired by the movie Natural Born Killers, with her boyfriend which included a murder and robbery in Mississippi, and a robbery and attempted murder in Louisiana. Sarah Edmondson was released on parole on May 20, 2010 and is serving her parole in Oklahoma which is set to end on June 1, 2025.

== Electoral history ==
Retain James E. Edmondson, 2024
Choice	Votes	%
For	737,462	51.02
Against	708,039	48.98
Total	1,445,501	100.00
