= Oklahoma State Capitol =

Capitol building of the U.S. state of Oklahoma

- U.S. National Register of Historic Places
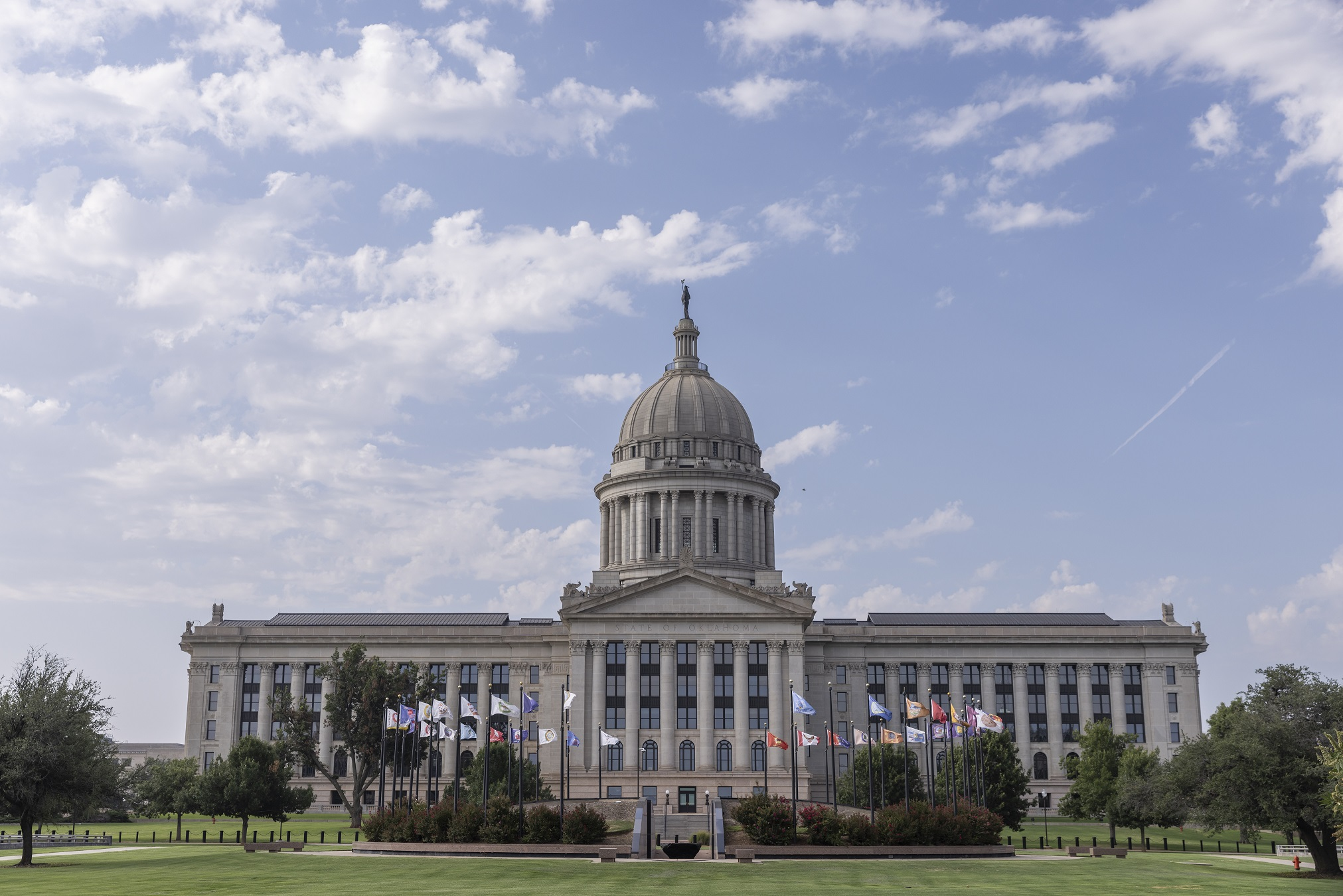
- North façade of the Capitol

- Location within Oklahoma Location within the United States
- Location: 22nd St. and Lincoln Boulevard, Oklahoma City, Oklahoma
- Coordinates: 35°29′32″N 97°30′11″W
- Area: 5 acres (2.0 ha)
- Built: 1917; 109 years ago
- Architect: Solomon Andrew Layton
- Architectural style: Renaissance Revival, Neoclassical
- NRHP reference No.: 76001572
- Added to NRHP: October 8, 1976

The Oklahoma State Capitol is the house of government of the U.S. state of Oklahoma. It is the building that houses the Oklahoma Legislature and executive branch offices. It is located along Lincoln Boulevard in Oklahoma City and contains 452,508 square feet of floor area. The present structure includes a dome completed in 2002.

Oklahoma's first capital was Guthrie, Oklahoma, but it moved to Oklahoma City in 1910. Construction began on the Oklahoma State Capitol in 1914 and was completed in 1917. Originally, it housed the judicial branch of Oklahoma, but the state's high courts moved most of their operations to the Oklahoma Judicial Center in 2011, leaving only the Supreme Court Hearing Chamber in the capitol building.

The state capitol complex is the only state capitol grounds in the United States with active oil rigs.

== History ==
=== Early capital of Guthrie (1889–1900) ===
Oklahoma's territorial capital and first state capital was located in the city of Guthrie. The settlement of the first state capital began at noon on April 22, 1889, when cannons sounded the start of the Oklahoma land run. The town was designated as the territorial capital in 1890.

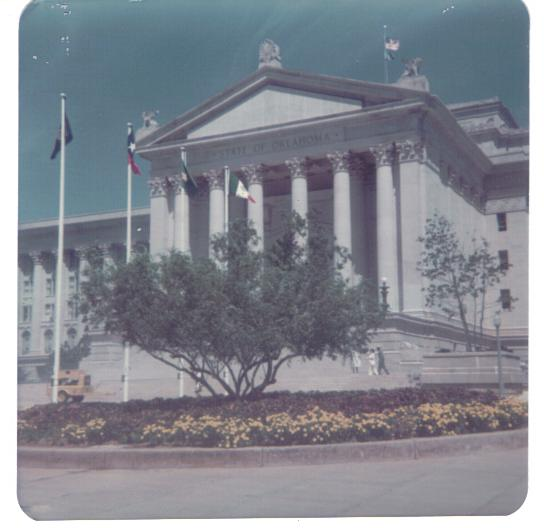
Entrance to Oklahoma State Capitol (1972 photograph)

=== Move to Oklahoma City and construction (1910–1917) ===
State government officials let voters decide on whether or not to move the capital to Oklahoma City. On June 11, 1910, the state seal was taken from Guthrie and moved south to Oklahoma City, where the Oklahoma State Capitol is located today. Ashton Bryant, the second Governor of Oklahoma, commissioned the architectural construction of the present day structure. Prior to its construction, state government offices were housed in the Huckins Hotel in downtown Oklahoma City.

Construction on the Oklahoma State Capitol began after a groundbreaking ceremony on July 20, 1914. Architects Soloman Andrew Layton (1864-1943) and S. Wemyss-Smith were paid $75,000 to develop the architectural plans, while James Stewart & Company received the construction contract.

The building's exterior is constructed mainly of Indiana limestone, with a base of local Oklahoma pink granite, and Oklahoma black granite for the center grand staircase. The interior prominently features marble as well as fixtures from a variety of sources. While original plans called for a dome, it was omitted due to cost overruns discovered in the second year of the construction project in 1915 when the original $1.5 million appropriated by the Oklahoma Legislature proved insufficient. The building was, however, designed with underground underlying foundations to be able to support a higher dome, which amazingly was finally added over a century later.

The building was completed on June 30, 1917.

=== Earthquake damage ===
In 1952, a 5.5-magnitude earthquake near El Reno caused several cracks to materialize in walls and ceilings of the Capitol, including one crack measuring about 50 feet in length.

=== Expansion and change (1998–present) ===
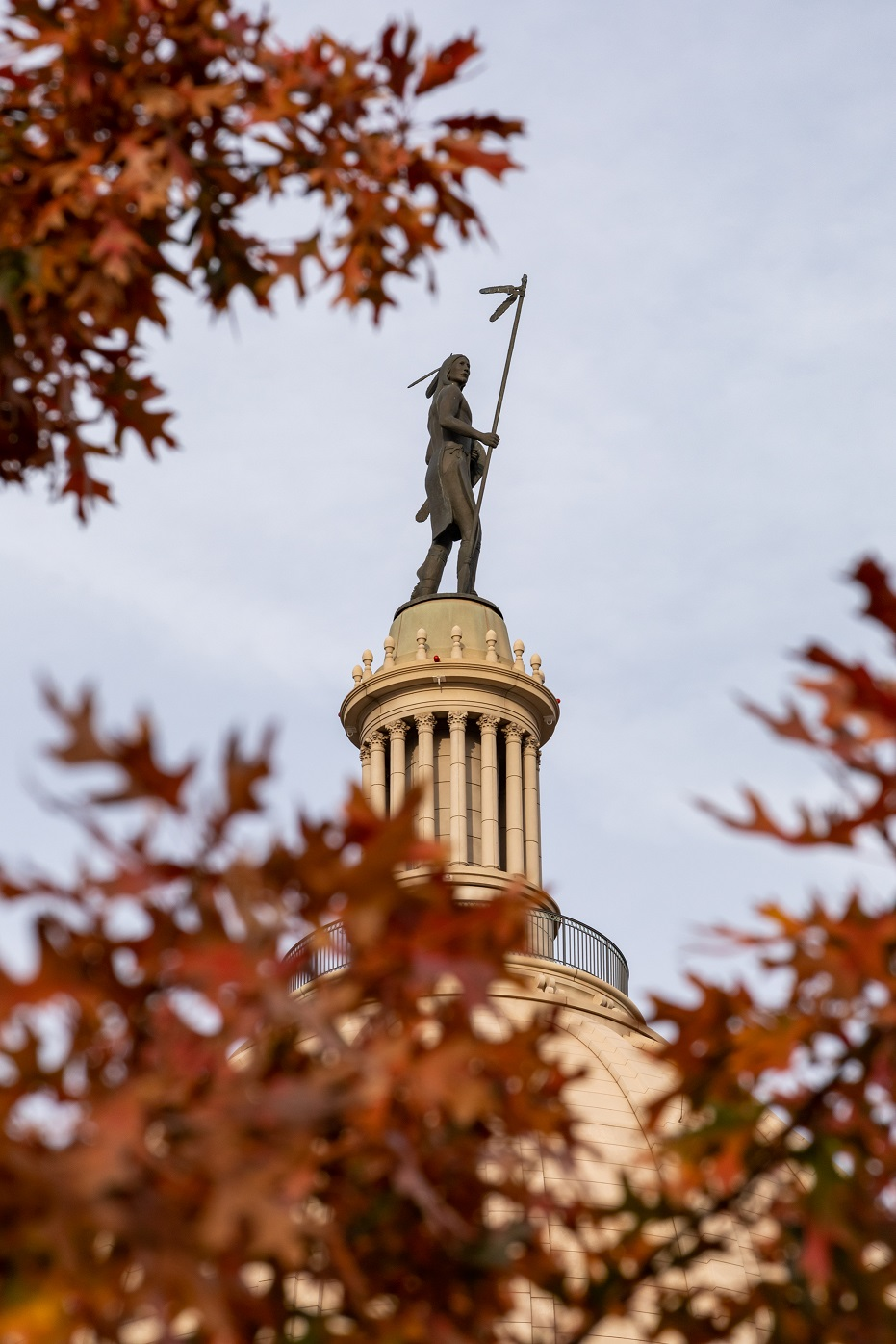
The Guardian atop the Capitol Dome

In 1998, state legislators and the governor enacted legislation to create the Oklahoma Centennial Act, which formed the Oklahoma Capitol Complex and Centennial Commemoration Commission. The commission worked to fund a dome, which was in the initial plans in 1914, for the Oklahoma State Capitol and construction of the dome began in 2001 and was completed in 2002. It included a 22 feet (6.7 m) bronze sculpture called The Guardian. During exterior restoration work in 2014, engineers discovered significant cracks in the precast panels that comprise the dome, but not in any of the supports. The building was designed and built to support the dome. When the Layton and Smith firm (the firm selected to design the building) presented its preliminary drawings to the commission in 1914, the plans did not include a dome. However, the building was designed to allow for a weighty dome to adorn the central square rotunda. The original commission was split on the desirability of the dome due to the high cost, and as completed, the capitol was not domed.

In 2006, plans were made to move the judicial branch into the old Oklahoma Historical Society building, as the agency was moving into the Oklahoma History Center. The court offices moved to the new Oklahoma Judicial Center in 2011.

=== Ten Commandments Monument controversy ===
The Ten Commandments Monument was installed outside the Capitol in 2012. The display prompted lawsuits from various groups such as the American Civil Liberties Union, and the original monument was vandalized and destroyed in 2014. The monument was rebuilt in January 2015 and removed from the capitol grounds that October, after the Oklahoma Supreme Court ruled that the monument violated the Oklahoma Constitution's ban on the use of public property to support religion.

== Exterior and Capitol complex ==
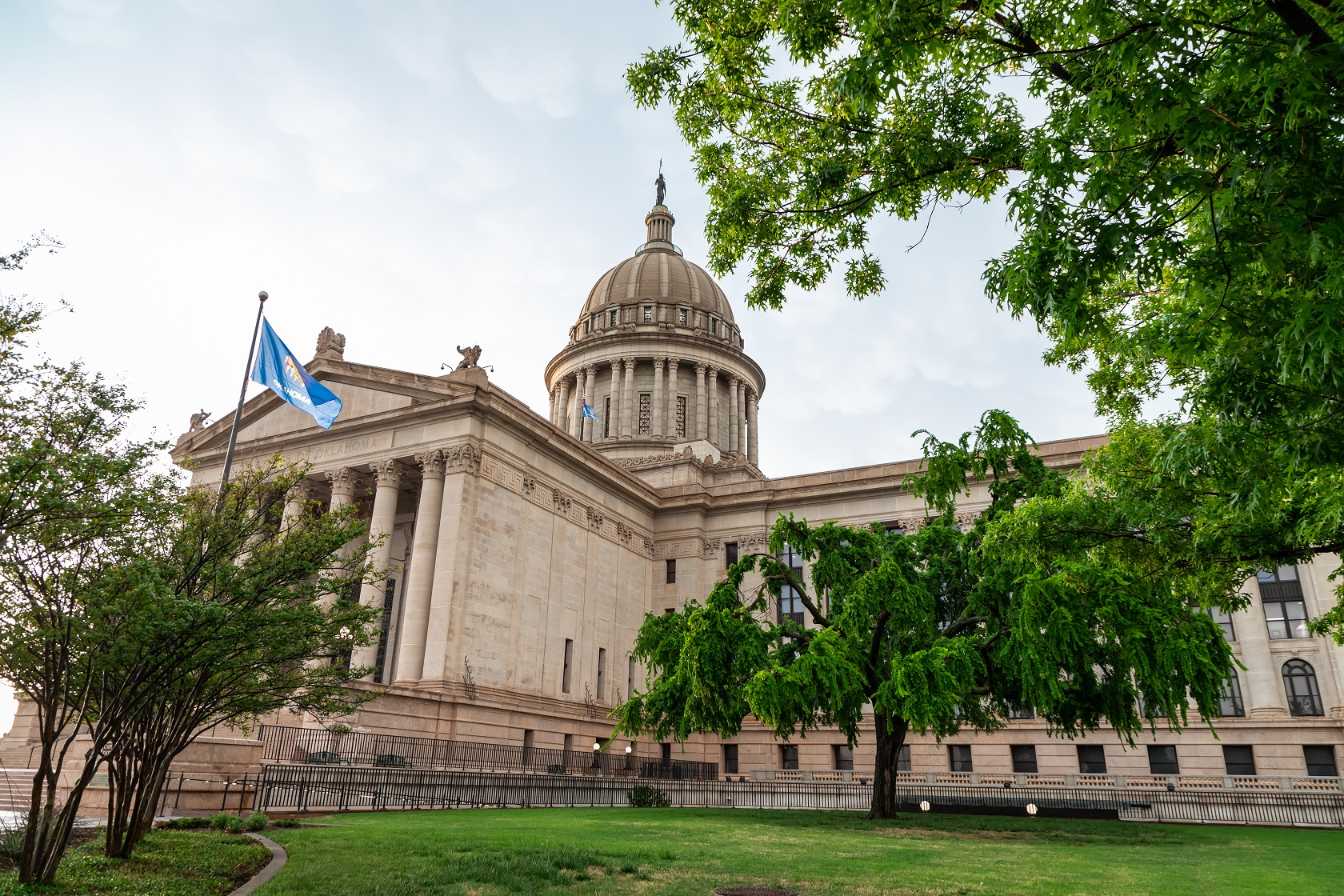
South view of the Capitol building.

The Oklahoma State Capitol, located at 2300 North Lincoln Boulevard, Oklahoma City is composed primarily of white limestone and Oklahoma pink granite. However, the building's dome is made of steel-reinforced concrete and reinforced plaster casts.

The state capitol complex is famous for its oil wells and remains the only state capitol grounds in the United States with active oil rigs. The capitol building is directly atop the Oklahoma City Oil Field.

The state capitol building and the surrounding government buildings, non-government agencies, museums, libraries, and tree lined streets and boulevards form the Oklahoma State Capitol Complex or Capitol Campus. The complex includes the State Capitol Park, the Oklahoma History Center, the Oklahoma Judicial Center, and the Oklahoma Governor's Mansion. The 14,000-square-foot (1,300 m^{2}) mansion has a limestone exterior to complement the Oklahoma State Capitol's exterior. The surrounding neighborhood is home to numerous restaurants and bars.

The Oklahoma History Center opened in 2005 and is operated by the Oklahoma Historical Society. It preserves the history of Oklahoma from prehistoric Native American tribes to the present day.

== Interior ==
The west wing of the Capitol houses the Oklahoma House of Representatives chamber and offices. The east wing houses the Oklahoma Senate chamber and offices. The ceremonial office of the governor is located on the second floor. Elected state officials such as the state auditor and inspector, state treasurer, and state attorney general have offices on the first floor. The building also contains a museum, a cafeteria, and a barber shop.

=== Art ===
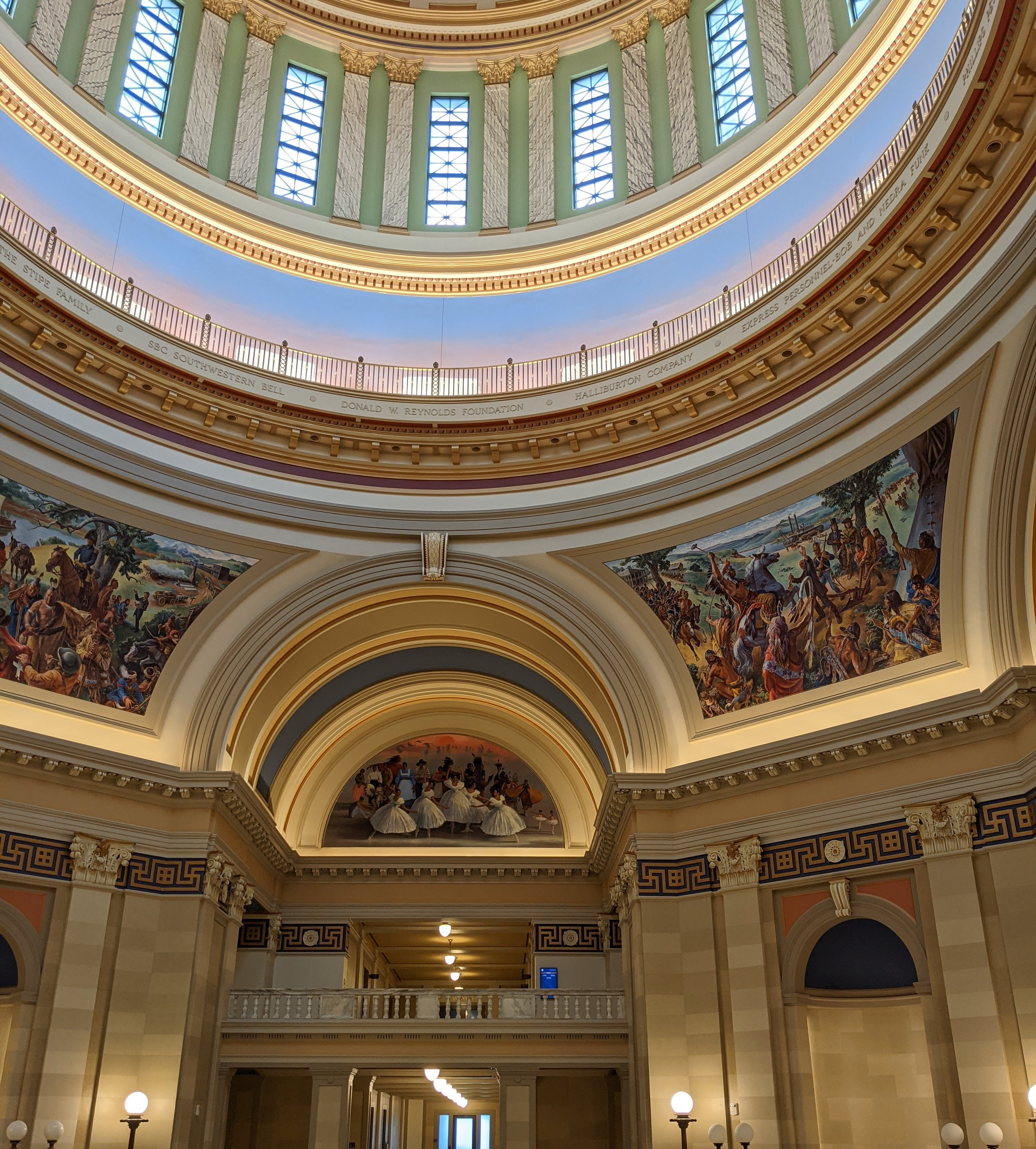
Rotunda with Flight of Spirit mural (center) and Ring of Honor (above)

Chickasaw artist Mike Larsen's mural Flight of Spirit, honoring the Five Moons, notable 20th-century Native American ballerinas from Oklahoma is on display in the Capitol rotunda. Several large paintings by Wayne Cooper are on display in the building. Many of them depict the early heritage and oil history of the state. Seminole artist Enoch Kelly Haney's painting The Earth and I are One is on display on the first floor of the building.

The Senate lobby includes a 6 by 10 feet (1.8 m × 3.0 m) oil-on-canvas painting of the Ceremonial Transfer of the Louisiana Purchase in New Orleans - 1803 by Mike Wimmer. The Senate Lounge displays a watercolor painting entitled Community of Boling Springs by Sonya Terpening.

=== The "Ring of Honor" ===
The base of the Capitol dome is decorated, in six-inch gold letters, with the names of donors who contributed at least $1 million to the dome's construction, referred to as "the ring of honor", a concept usually limited to the most prominent players on professional football teams. Donors so named include Halliburton, Hobby Lobby Stores, "the People of Oklahoma", and General Motors. This design decision attracted some criticism at the time, and in 2011 state representative Eric Proctor attempted to pass legislation replacing the names with those of Oklahomans who had received the Congressional Medal of Honor.

== Gallery ==
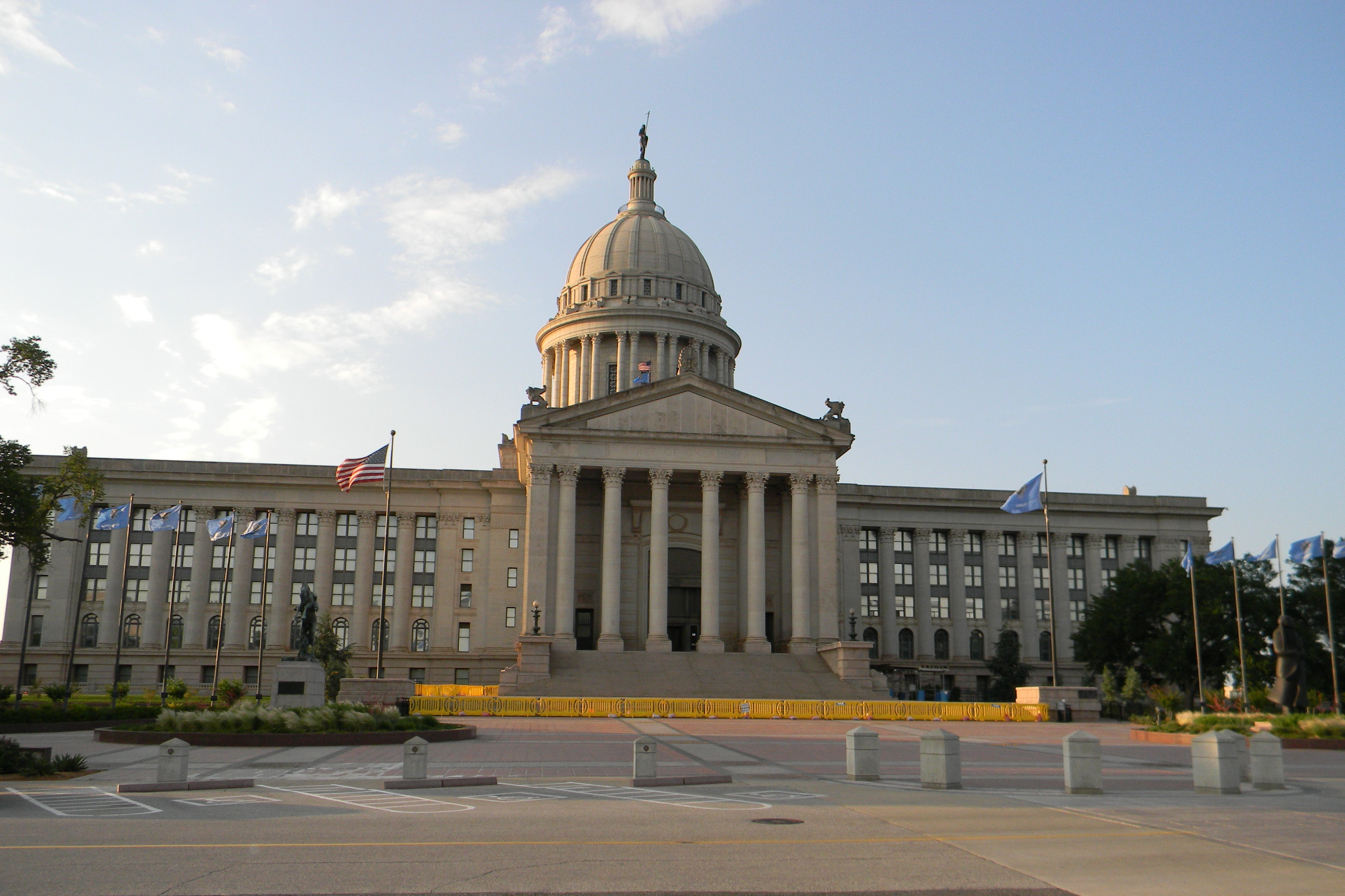
Oklahoma State Capitol Facade

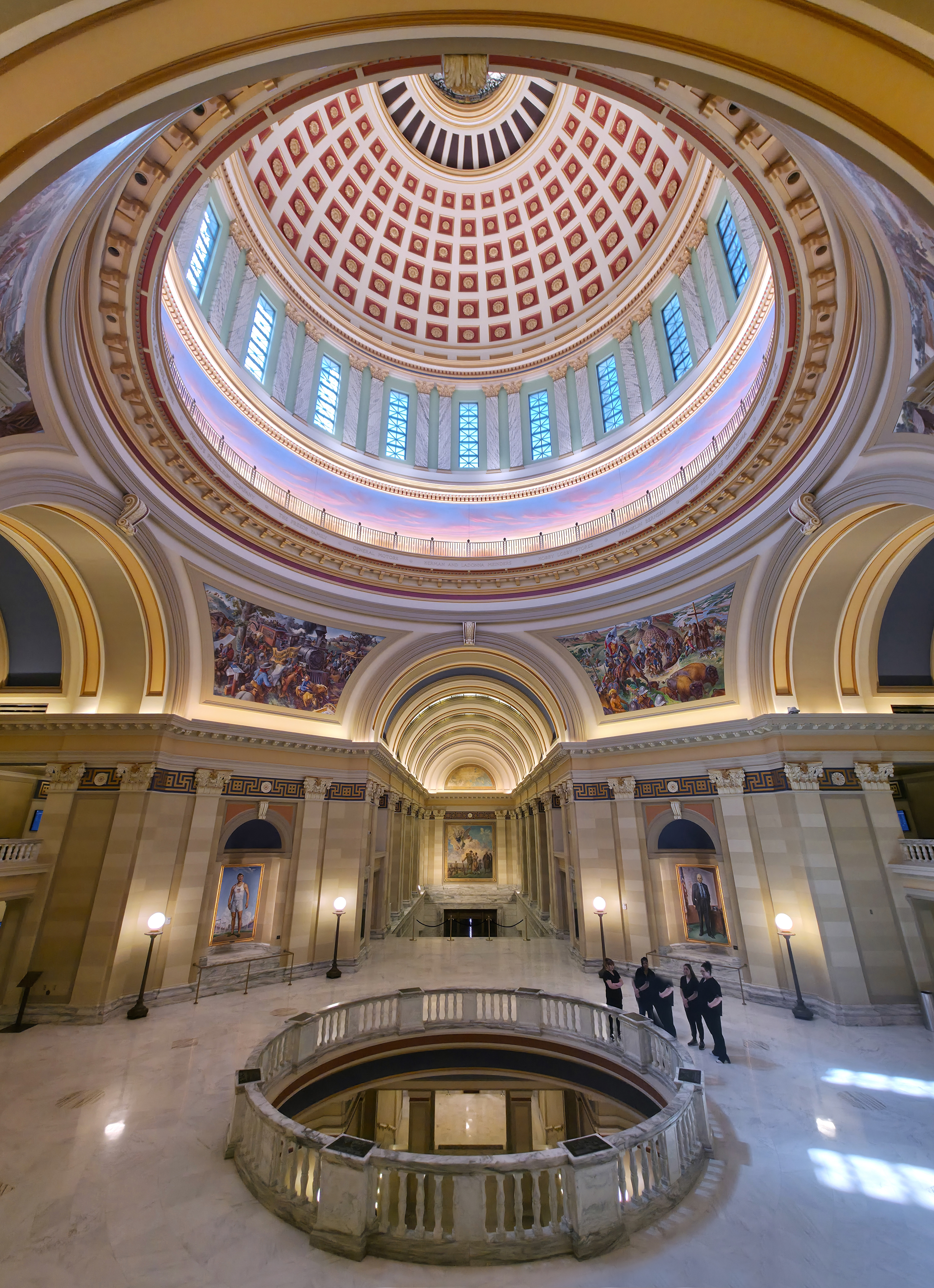
The Rotunda

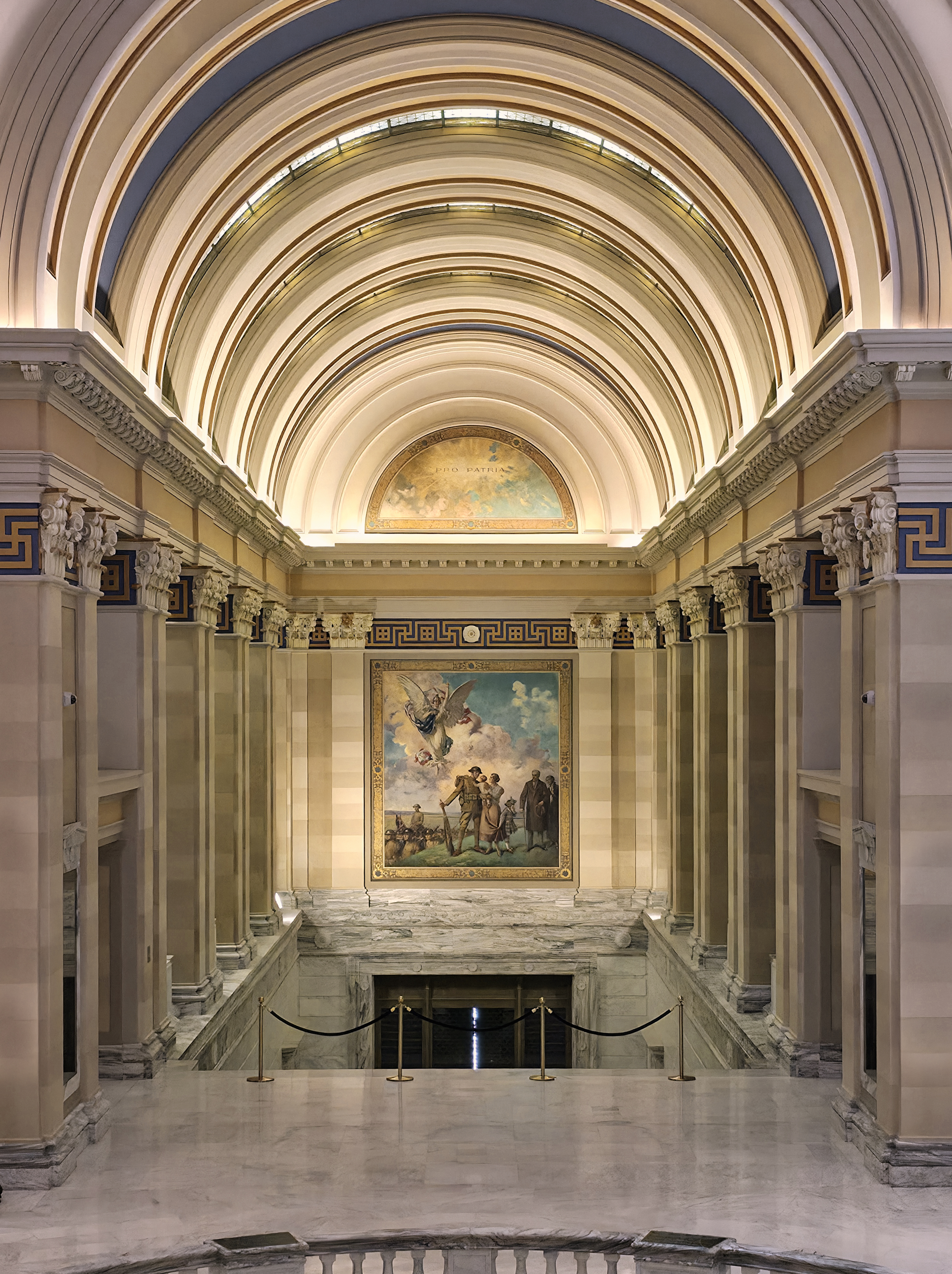
The Grand Staircase

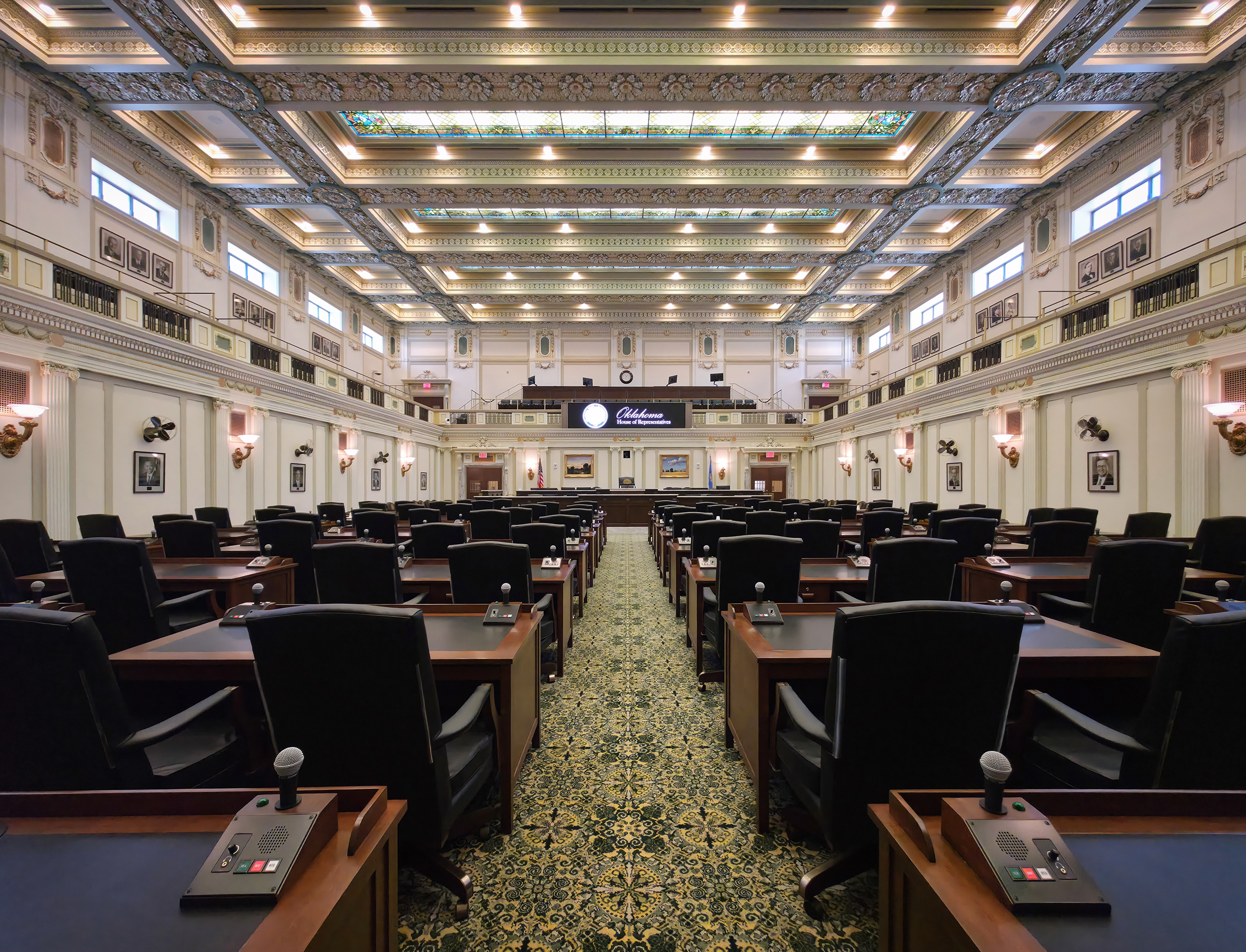
The House Chamber

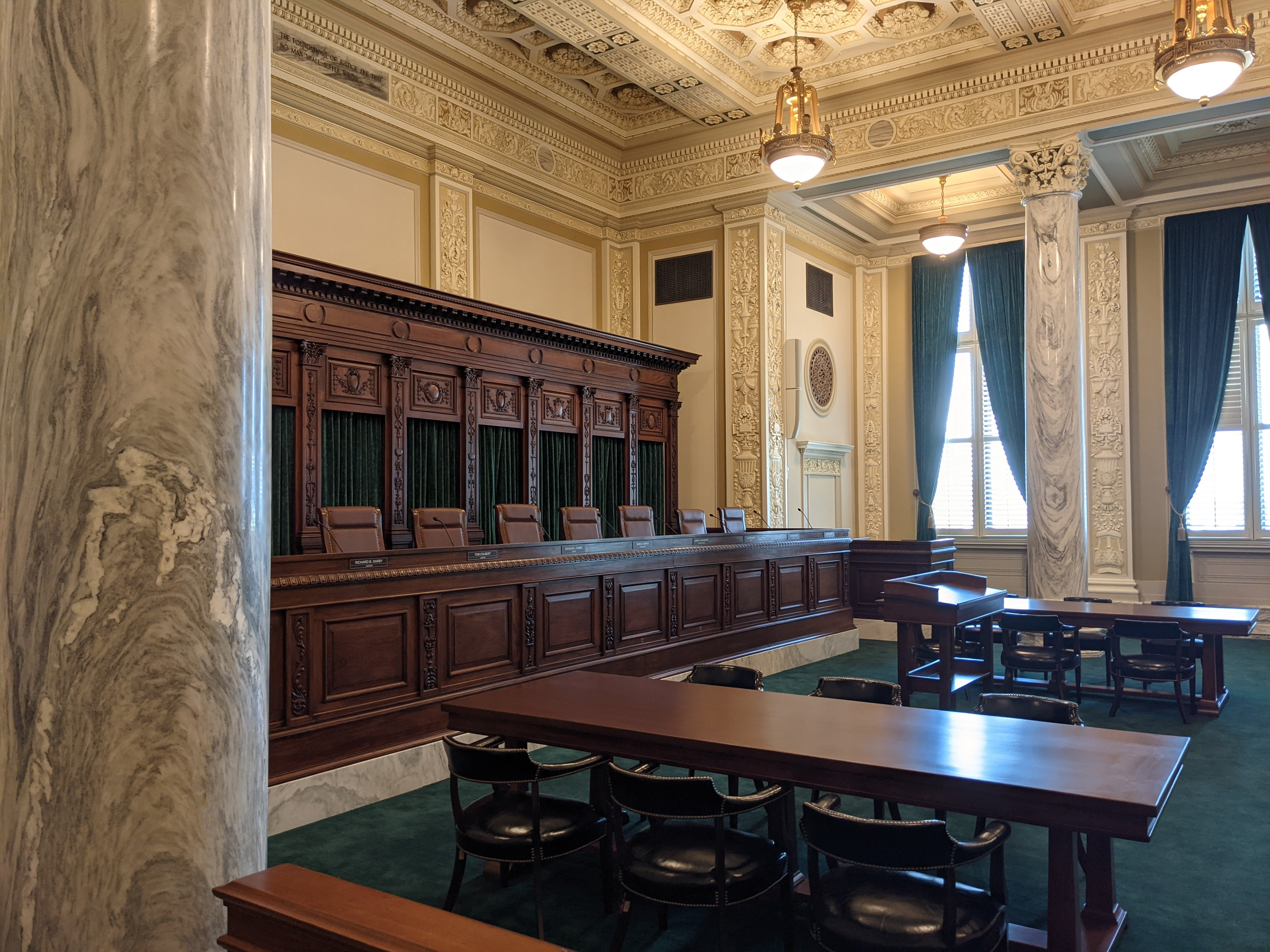
Supreme Court chamber

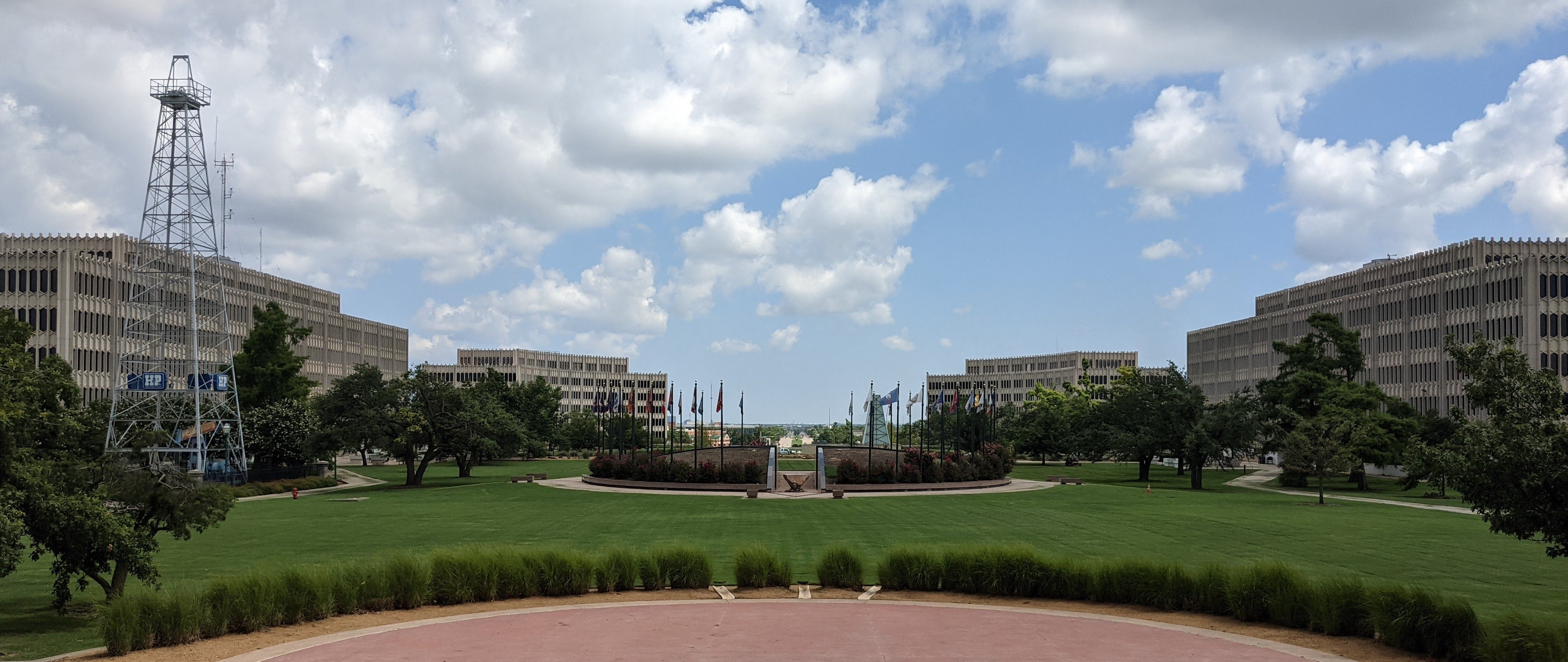
View from the north side of the Capitol

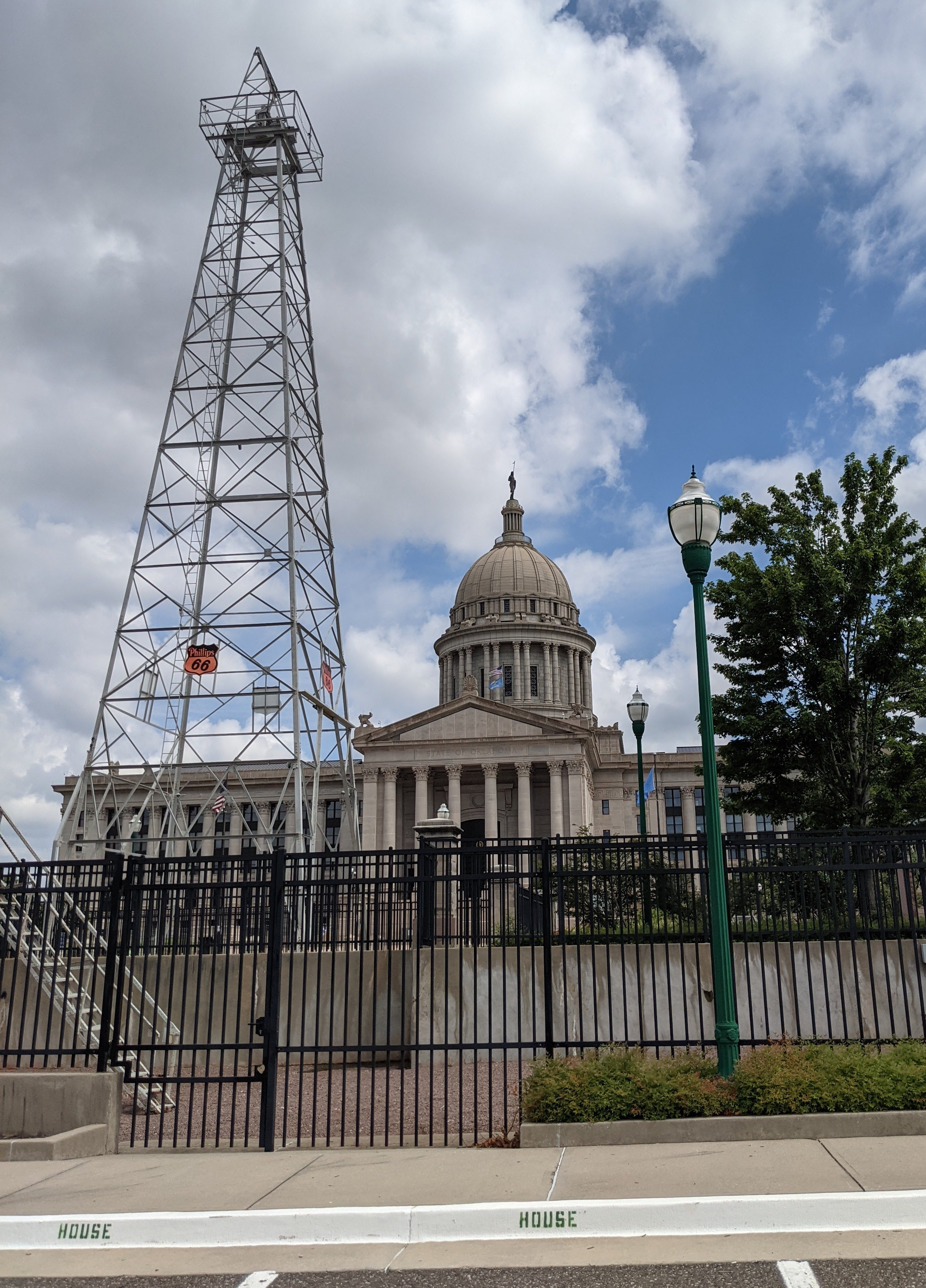
Oil rig on south side of the Capitol

== See also ==
External videos
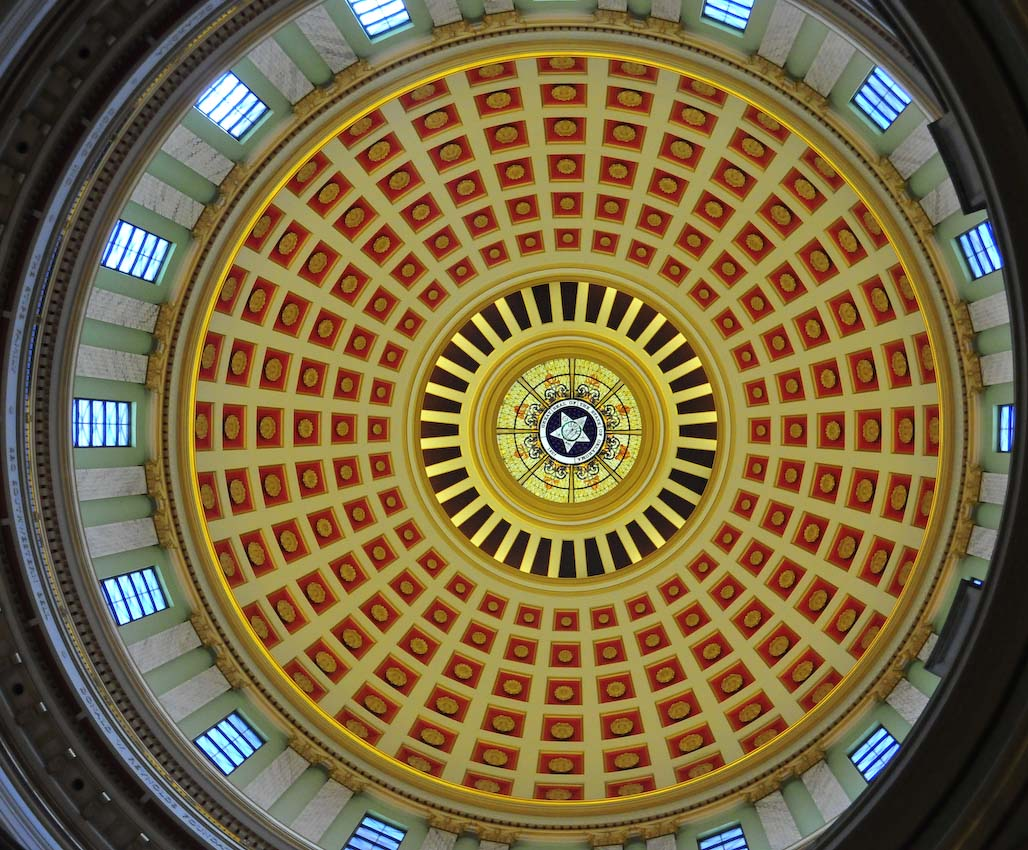
- Oklahoma Capitol Building (15:23), C-SPAN

- As Long as the Waters Flow
- List of Oklahoma state legislatures
- List of state and territorial capitols in the United States
- List of National Historic Landmarks in Oklahoma
- List of tallest buildings in Oklahoma City
- History of Oklahoma
- History of Oklahoma City
- Government of Oklahoma
- Cherokee Capitol Building
- Chickasaw Capitol Building
- Choctaw Capitol Building
- Creek Capitol Building
- Osage Council House
