= Political party strength in Oklahoma =

Politics in the US state of Oklahoma

The following tables indicate the party of elected officials in the U.S. state of Oklahoma:

- Governor
- Lieutenant Governor
- Secretary of State
- Attorney General
- State Auditor, State Examiner and Inspector, and State Auditor and Inspector
- State Treasurer
- Superintendent of Public Instruction
- Commissioner of Labor
- Commissioner of Insurance

The tables also indicate the historical party composition in the:

- State Senate
- State House of Representatives
- State Corporation Commission
- State delegation to the U.S. Senate
- State delegation to the U.S. House of Representatives

For years in which a presidential election was held, the tables indicate which party's nominees received the state's electoral votes.

== 1907–1978 ==
Year	Executive offices										State Legislature		Corp. Comm.	United States Congress			Electoral votes
Year	Governor	Lt. Governor	Sec. of State	Attorney General	Auditor	Examiner & Inspector	Treasurer	Supt. of Pub. Inst.	Labor Comm.	Ins. Comm.	Senate	House	Corp. Comm.	Senator (Class II)	Senator (Class III)	House	Electoral votes
1907	Charles N. Haskell (D)	George W. Bellamy (D)	William Macklin Cross (D) (Note: Died in office.)	Charles West (D)	Martin E. Trapp (D)	Charles A. Taylor (D)	James Menefee (D)	Evan Dhu Cameron (D)	Charles L. Daugherty (D)	T. J. McComb (D) (Note: Resigned.)	39D, 5R	92D, 17R	3D	Robert L. Owen (D)	Thomas Gore (D)	4D, 1R	Electoral votes
1908	Charles N. Haskell (D)	George W. Bellamy (D)	William Macklin Cross (D)	Charles West (D)	Martin E. Trapp (D)	Charles A. Taylor (D)	James Menefee (D)	Evan Dhu Cameron (D)	Charles L. Daugherty (D)	T. J. McComb (D)	39D, 5R	92D, 17R	3D	Robert L. Owen (D)	Thomas Gore (D)	4D, 1R	Bryan/ Kern (D); ✗
1909	Charles N. Haskell (D)	George W. Bellamy (D)	William Macklin Cross (D)	Charles West (D)	Martin E. Trapp (D)	Charles A. Taylor (D)	James Menefee (D)	Evan Dhu Cameron (D)	Charles L. Daugherty (D)	T. J. McComb (D)	34D, 10R	68D, 41R	3D	Robert L. Owen (D)	Thomas Gore (D)	3R, 2D	Bryan/ Kern (D); ✗
1910	Charles N. Haskell (D)	George W. Bellamy (D)	Thomas Smith (D) (Note: Appointed by governor to fill vacancy.)	Charles West (D)	Martin E. Trapp (D)	Charles A. Taylor (D)	James Menefee (D)	Evan Dhu Cameron (D)	Charles L. Daugherty (D)	Milas Lasater (D)	34D, 10R	68D, 41R	3D	Robert L. Owen (D)	Thomas Gore (D)	3R, 2D	Bryan/ Kern (D); ✗
1911	Lee Cruce (D)	J. J. McAlester (D)	Benjamin F. Harrison (D)	Charles West (D)	Leo Meyer (D)	Charles A. Taylor (D)	Robert Dunlop (D)	R. H. Wilson (D)	Charles L. Daugherty (D)	P. A. Ballard (D)	31D, 13R	82D, 27R	3D	Robert L. Owen (D)	Thomas Gore (D)	3D, 2R	Bryan/ Kern (D); ✗
1912	Lee Cruce (D)	J. J. McAlester (D)	Benjamin F. Harrison (D)	Charles West (D)	Leo Meyer (D)	Fred Parkinson (D)	Robert Dunlop (D)	R. H. Wilson (D)	Charles L. Daugherty (D)	P. A. Ballard (D)	31D, 13R	82D, 27R	3D	Robert L. Owen (D)	Thomas Gore (D)	3D, 2R	Wilson/ Marshall (D); ✓
1913	Lee Cruce (D)	J. J. McAlester (D)	Benjamin F. Harrison (D)	Charles West (D)	Joseph C. McClelland (D)	Fred Parkinson (D)	Robert Dunlop (D)	R. H. Wilson (D)	Charles L. Daugherty (D)	A. L. Welch (D)	36D, 8R	80D, 18R	3D	Robert L. Owen (D)	Thomas Gore (D)	6D, 2R	Wilson/ Marshall (D); ✓
1914	Lee Cruce (D)	J. J. McAlester (D)	Benjamin F. Harrison (D)	Charles West (D)	Joseph C. McClelland (D)	Fred Parkinson (D)	Robert Dunlop (D)	R. H. Wilson (D)	Charles L. Daugherty (D)	A. L. Welch (D)	36D, 8R	80D, 18R	3D	Robert L. Owen (D)	Thomas Gore (D)	6D, 2R	Wilson/ Marshall (D); ✓
1915	Robert L. Williams (D)	Martin E. Trapp (D)	Joseph Lucien Lyon (D) (Note: Before Lyon's swearing-in on January 11, B.F. Harrison resigned on January 2, and H. G. Oliver was appointed for the nine-day interim.)	Sargent Prentiss Freeling (D)	Everette B. Howard (D)	Fred Parkinson (D)	William Lee Alexander (D)	R. H. Wilson (D)	W. G. Ashton (D)	A. L. Welch (D)	38D, 5R, 1Soc	75D, 17R, 5Soc	3D	Robert L. Owen (D)	Thomas Gore (D)	7D, 1R	Wilson/ Marshall (D); ✓
1916	Robert L. Williams (D)	Martin E. Trapp (D)	Joseph Lucien Lyon (D)	Sargent Prentiss Freeling (D)	Everette B. Howard (D)	Fred Parkinson (D)	William Lee Alexander (D)	R. H. Wilson (D)	W. G. Ashton (D)	A. L. Welch (D)	38D, 5R, 1Soc	75D, 17R, 5Soc	3D	Robert L. Owen (D)	Thomas Gore (D)	7D, 1R	Wilson/ Marshall (D); ✓
1917	Robert L. Williams (D)	Martin E. Trapp (D)	Joseph Lucien Lyon (D)	Sargent Prentiss Freeling (D)	Everette B. Howard (D)	Fred Parkinson (D)	William Lee Alexander (D)	R. H. Wilson (D)	W. G. Ashton (D)	A. L. Welch (D)	38D, 5R, 1Soc	85D, 26R	3D	Robert L. Owen (D)	Thomas Gore (D)	6D, 2R	Wilson/ Marshall (D); ✓
1918	Robert L. Williams (D)	Martin E. Trapp (D)	Joseph Lucien Lyon (D)	Sargent Prentiss Freeling (D)	Everette B. Howard (D)	Fred Parkinson (D)	William Lee Alexander (D)	R. H. Wilson (D)	Claude Connally (D)	A. L. Welch (D)	38D, 5R, 1Soc	85D, 26R	3D	Robert L. Owen (D)	Thomas Gore (D)	6D, 2R	Wilson/ Marshall (D); ✓
1919	James B. A. Robertson (D)	Martin E. Trapp (D)	Joe Morris (D)	Sargent Prentiss Freeling (D)	Frank C. Carter (D)	Fred Parkinson (D)	A. N. Leecraft (D)	R. H. Wilson (D)	Claude Connally (D)	A. L. Welch (D)	34D, 10R	74D, 30R	3D	Robert L. Owen (D)	Thomas Gore (D)	6D, 2R	Wilson/ Marshall (D); ✓
1920	James B. A. Robertson (D)	Martin E. Trapp (D)	Joe Morris (D)	Sargent Prentiss Freeling (D)	Frank C. Carter (D)	Fred Parkinson (D)	A. N. Leecraft (D)	R. H. Wilson (D)	Claude Connally (D)	E. W. Hardon (D)	34D, 10R	74D, 30R	3D	Robert L. Owen (D)	Thomas Gore (D)	6D, 2R	Harding/ Coolidge (R); ✓
1921	James B. A. Robertson (D)	Martin E. Trapp (D)	Joe Morris (D)	Sargent Prentiss Freeling (D)	Frank C. Carter (D)	Fred Parkinson (D)	A. N. Leecraft (D)	R. H. Wilson (D)	Claude Connally (D)	E. W. Hardon (D)	27D, 17R	55R, 47D	2D, 1R	Robert L. Owen (D)	John W. Harreld (R)	5R, 3D	Harding/ Coolidge (R); ✓
1922	James B. A. Robertson (D)	Martin E. Trapp (D)	Joe Morris (D)	Sargent Prentiss Freeling (D)	Frank C. Carter (D)	Fred Parkinson (D)	A. N. Leecraft (D)	R. H. Wilson (D)	Claude Connally (D)	E. W. Hardon (D)	27D, 17R	55R, 47D	2D, 1R	Robert L. Owen (D)	John W. Harreld (R)	5R, 3D	Harding/ Coolidge (R); ✓
1923	Jack C. Walton (D) (Note: Impeached.)	Martin E. Trapp (D)	Richard A. Sneed (D)	George F. Short (D)	C. C. Childers (D)	George J. Mechling (D)	A. S. J. Shaw (D)	M. A. Nash (D)	Claude Connally (D)	E. W. Hardon (D)	32D, 12R	93D, 14R	2D, 1R	Robert L. Owen (D)	John W. Harreld (R)	7D, 1R	Harding/ Coolidge (R); ✓
1924	Martin E. Trapp (D)	vacant	Richard A. Sneed (D)	George F. Short (D)	C. C. Childers (D)	George J. Mechling (D)	A. S. J. Shaw (D)	M. A. Nash (D)	Claude Connally (D)	Jess G. Read (D)	32D, 12R	93D, 14R	2D, 1R	Robert L. Owen (D)	John W. Harreld (R)	7D, 1R	Davis/ Bryan (D) ✗
1925	Martin E. Trapp (D)	vacant	Richard A. Sneed (D)	George F. Short (D)	C. C. Childers (D)	George J. Mechling (D)	A. S. J. Shaw (D)	M. A. Nash (D)	Claude Connally (D)	Jess G. Read (D)	38D, 6R	81D, 27R	2D, 1R	William B. Pine (R)	John W. Harreld (R)	6D, 2R	Davis/ Bryan (D) ✗
1926	Martin E. Trapp (D)	vacant	Richard A. Sneed (D)	George F. Short (D)	C. C. Childers (D)	George J. Mechling (D)	A. S. J. Shaw (D)	M. A. Nash (D)	Claude Connally (D)	Jess G. Read (D)	38D, 6R	81D, 27R	2D, 1R	William B. Pine (R)	John W. Harreld (R)	6D, 2R	Davis/ Bryan (D) ✗
1927	Henry S. Johnston (D)	William J. Holloway (D)	John Graves Leeper (D)	Ed Dabney (D)	A. S. J. Shaw (D)	John Rogers (D)	Richard A. Sneed (D)	John S. Vaughan (D)	W. A. Pat Murphy (D)	Jess G. Read (D)	35D, 9R	87D, 21R	3D	William B. Pine (R)	Elmer Thomas (D)	7D, 1R	Davis/ Bryan (D) ✗
1928	Henry S. Johnston (D)	William J. Holloway (D)	John Graves Leeper (D)	Ed Dabney (D)	A. S. J. Shaw (D)	John Rogers (D)	Richard A. Sneed (D)	John S. Vaughan (D)	W. A. Pat Murphy (D)	Jess G. Read (D)	35D, 9R	87D, 21R	3D	William B. Pine (R)	Elmer Thomas (D)	7D, 1R	Hoover/ Curtis (R); ✓
1929	William J. Holloway (D)	vacant	John Graves Leeper (D)	Ed Dabney (D)	A. S. J. Shaw (D)	John Rogers (D)	Richard A. Sneed (D)	John S. Vaughan (D)	W. A. Pat Murphy (D)	Jess G. Read (D)	32D, 12R	56D, 47R	2D, 1R	William B. Pine (R)	Elmer Thomas (D)	5D, 3R	Hoover/ Curtis (R); ✓
1930	William J. Holloway (D)	vacant	John Graves Leeper (D)	Ed Dabney (D)	A. S. J. Shaw (D)	John Rogers (D)	Richard A. Sneed (D)	John S. Vaughan (D)	W. A. Pat Murphy (D)	Jess G. Read (D)	32D, 12R	56D, 47R	2D, 1R	William B. Pine (R)	Elmer Thomas (D)	5D, 3R	Hoover/ Curtis (R); ✓
1931	William H. Murray (D)	Robert Burns (D)	Richard A. Sneed (D)	J. Berry King (D)	Frank C. Carter (D)	John Rogers (D)	Ray Weems (D)	John S. Vaughan (D)	W. A. Pat Murphy (D)	Jess G. Read (D)	32D, 12R	88D, 9R	2D, 1R	Thomas Gore (D)	Elmer Thomas (D)	7D, 1R	Hoover/ Curtis (R); ✓
1932	William H. Murray (D)	Robert Burns (D)	Richard A. Sneed (D)	J. Berry King (D)	Frank C. Carter (D)	John Rogers (D)	Ray Weems (D)	John S. Vaughan (D)	W. A. Pat Murphy (D)	Jess G. Read (D)	32D, 12R	88D, 9R	2D, 1R	Thomas Gore (D)	Elmer Thomas (D)	7D, 1R	Roosevelt/ Garner (D); ✓
1933	William H. Murray (D)	Robert Burns (D)	Richard A. Sneed (D)	J. Berry King (D)	Frank C. Carter (D)	John Rogers (D)	Ray Weems (D)	John S. Vaughan (D)	W. A. Pat Murphy (D)	Jess G. Read (D)	39D, 5R	113D, 4R, 1I	2D, 1R	Thomas Gore (D)	Elmer Thomas (D)	8D, 1D	Roosevelt/ Garner (D); ✓
1934	William H. Murray (D)	Robert Burns (D)	Richard A. Sneed (D)	J. Berry King (D)	Frank C. Carter (D)	John Rogers (D)	Ray Weems (D)	John S. Vaughan (D)	W. A. Pat Murphy (D)	Jess G. Read (D)	39D, 5R	113D, 4R, 1I	2D, 1R	Thomas Gore (D)	Elmer Thomas (D)	8D, 1D	Roosevelt/ Garner (D); ✓
1935	E. W. Marland (D)	James E. Berry (D)	Frank C. Carter (D)	Mac Q. Williamson (D)	C. C. Childers (D)	John Rogers (D)	Hubert L. Bolen (D) (Note: A Democrat, Hugh L. Harrell, won the Treasurer’s race in 1934, but resigned after just a few weeks into his term to become President of the Wichita Land Bank, leading to Bolen’s appointment.)	John S. Vaughan (D)	W. A. Pat Murphy (D)	Jess G. Read (D)	43D, 1R	112D, 7R, 1I	3D	Thomas Gore (D)	Elmer Thomas (D)	8D, 1D	Roosevelt/ Garner (D); ✓
1936	E. W. Marland (D)	James E. Berry (D)	Frank C. Carter (D)	Mac Q. Williamson (D)	C. C. Childers (D)	John Rogers (D)	Hubert L. Bolen (D)	John S. Vaughan (D)	W. A. Pat Murphy (D)	Jess G. Read (D)	43D, 1R	112D, 7R, 1I	3D	Thomas Gore (D)	Elmer Thomas (D)	8D, 1D	Roosevelt/ Garner (D); ✓
1937	E. W. Marland (D)	James E. Berry (D)	Frank C. Carter (D)	Mac Q. Williamson (D)	C. C. Childers (D)	John Rogers (D)	Hubert L. Bolen (D)	A. L. Crable (D)	W. A. Pat Murphy (D)	Jess G. Read (D)	44D	114D, 3R	3D	Joshua B. Lee (D)	Elmer Thomas (D)	8D, 1D	Roosevelt/ Garner (D); ✓
1938	E. W. Marland (D)	James E. Berry (D)	Frank C. Carter (D)	Mac Q. Williamson (D)	C. C. Childers (D)	John Rogers (D)	Hubert L. Bolen (D)	A. L. Crable (D)	W. A. Pat Murphy (D)	Jess G. Read (D)	44D	114D, 3R	3D	Joshua B. Lee (D)	Elmer Thomas (D)	8D, 1D	Roosevelt/ Garner (D); ✓
1939	Leon C. Phillips (D)	James E. Berry (D)	C. C. Childers (D)	Mac Q. Williamson (D)	Frank C. Carter (D)	John Rogers (D)	Carl B. Sebring (D)	A. L. Crable (D)	W. A. Pat Murphy (D)	Jess G. Read (D)	43D, 1R	102D, 13R	3D	Joshua B. Lee (D)	Elmer Thomas (D)	8D, 1D	Roosevelt/ Garner (D); ✓
1940	Leon C. Phillips (D)	James E. Berry (D)	C. C. Childers (D)	Mac Q. Williamson (D)	Frank C. Carter (D)	John Rogers (D)	Carl B. Sebring (D)	A. L. Crable (D)	W. A. Pat Murphy (D)	Jess G. Read (D)	43D, 1R	102D, 13R	3D	Joshua B. Lee (D)	Elmer Thomas (D)	8D, 1D	Roosevelt/ Wallace (D); ✓
1941	Leon C. Phillips (D)	James E. Berry (D)	C. C. Childers (D)	Mac Q. Williamson (D)	Frank C. Carter (D)	John Rogers (D)	Carl B. Sebring (D)	A. L. Crable (D)	W. A. Pat Murphy (D)	Jess G. Read (D)	42D, 2R	114D, 7R	3D	Joshua B. Lee (D)	Elmer Thomas (D)	8D, 1R	Roosevelt/ Wallace (D); ✓
1942	Leon C. Phillips (D)	James E. Berry (D)	C. C. Childers (D)	Mac Q. Williamson (D)	Frank C. Carter (D)	John Rogers (D)	Carl B. Sebring (D)	A. L. Crable (D)	W. A. Pat Murphy (D)	Jess G. Read (D)	42D, 2R	114D, 7R	3D	Joshua B. Lee (D)	Elmer Thomas (D)	8D, 1R	Roosevelt/ Wallace (D); ✓
1943	Robert S. Kerr (D)	James E. Berry (D)	Frank C. Carter (D)	Randell S. Cobb (D)	C. C. Childers (D)	John Rogers (D)	A. S. J. Shaw (D)	A. L. Crable (D)	W. A. Pat Murphy (D)	Jess G. Read (D)	40D, 4R	93D, 24R	3D	Edward H. Moore (R)	Elmer Thomas (D)	7D, 1R	Roosevelt/ Wallace (D); ✓
1944	Robert S. Kerr (D)	James E. Berry (D)	Frank C. Carter (D)	Randell S. Cobb (D)	C. C. Childers (D)	John Rogers (D)	A. S. J. Shaw (D)	A. L. Crable (D)	W. A. Pat Murphy (D)	Jess G. Read (D)	40D, 4R	93D, 24R	3D	Edward H. Moore (R)	Elmer Thomas (D)	7D, 1R	Roosevelt/ Truman (D); ✓
1945	Robert S. Kerr (D)	James E. Berry (D)	Frank C. Carter (D)	Randell S. Cobb (D)	C. C. Childers (D)	John Rogers (D)	A. S. J. Shaw (D)	A. L. Crable (D)	W. A. Pat Murphy (D)	Jess G. Read (D)	38D, 6R	98D, 22R	3D	Edward H. Moore (R)	Elmer Thomas (D)	6D, 2R	Roosevelt/ Truman (D); ✓
1946	Robert S. Kerr (D)	James E. Berry (D)	Katherine Manton (D)	Mac Q. Williamson (D)	C. C. Childers (D)	Charles G. Morris (D)	A. S. J. Shaw (D)	A. L. Crable (D)	W. A. Pat Murphy (D)	Jess G. Read (D)	38D, 6R	98D, 22R	3D	Edward H. Moore (R)	Elmer Thomas (D)	6D, 2R	Roosevelt/ Truman (D); ✓
1947	Roy J. Turner (D)	James E. Berry (D)	Wilburn Cartwright (D)	Mac Q. Williamson (D)	A. S. J. Shaw (D)	Charles G. Morris (D)	John D. Conner (D)	Oliver Hodge (D)	Jim Hughes (D)	Donald F. Dickey (D)	37D, 7R	95D, 23R	3D	Edward H. Moore (R)	Elmer Thomas (D)	6D, 2R	Roosevelt/ Truman (D); ✓
1948	Roy J. Turner (D)	James E. Berry (D)	Wilburn Cartwright (D)	Mac Q. Williamson (D)	A. S. J. Shaw (D)	Charles G. Morris (D)	John D. Conner (D)	Oliver Hodge (D)	Jim Hughes (D)	Donald F. Dickey (D)	37D, 7R	95D, 23R	3D	Edward H. Moore (R)	Elmer Thomas (D)	6D, 2R	Truman/ Barkley (D); ✓
1949	Roy J. Turner (D)	James E. Berry (D)	Wilburn Cartwright (D)	Mac Q. Williamson (D)	A. S. J. Shaw (D)	Charles G. Morris (D)	John D. Conner (D)	Oliver Hodge (D)	Jim Hughes (D)	Donald F. Dickey (D)	39D, 5R	103D, 12R	3D	Robert S. Kerr (D)	Elmer Thomas (D)	8D	Truman/ Barkley (D); ✓
1950	Roy J. Turner (D)	James E. Berry (D)	Wilburn Cartwright (D)	Mac Q. Williamson (D)	A. S. J. Shaw (D)	Charles G. Morris (D)	John D. Conner (D)	Oliver Hodge (D)	Jim Hughes (D)	Donald F. Dickey (D)	39D, 5R	103D, 12R	3D	Robert S. Kerr (D)	Elmer Thomas (D)	8D	Truman/ Barkley (D); ✓
1951	Johnston Murray (D)	James E. Berry (D)	John D. Conner (D)	Mac Q. Williamson (D)	Wilburn Cartwright (D)	Charles G. Morris (D)	A. S. J. Shaw (D)	Oliver Hodge (D)	Jim Hughes (D)	Donald F. Dickey (D)	41D, 3R	99D, 19R	3D	Robert S. Kerr (D)	Mike Monroney (D)	6D, 2R	Truman/ Barkley (D); ✓
1952	Johnston Murray (D)	James E. Berry (D)	John D. Conner (D)	Mac Q. Williamson (D)	Wilburn Cartwright (D)	Charles G. Morris (D)	A. S. J. Shaw (D)	Oliver Hodge (D)	Jim Hughes (D)	Donald F. Dickey (D)	41D, 3R	99D, 19R	3D	Robert S. Kerr (D)	Mike Monroney (D)	6D, 2R	Eisenhower/ Nixon (R); ✓
1953	Johnston Murray (D)	James E. Berry (D)	John D. Conner (D)	Mac Q. Williamson (D)	Wilburn Cartwright (D)	Charles G. Morris (D)	A. S. J. Shaw (D)	Oliver Hodge (D)	Jim Hughes (D)	Donald F. Dickey (D)	38D, 6R	104D, 20R	3D	Robert S. Kerr (D)	Mike Monroney (D)	5D, 1R	Eisenhower/ Nixon (R); ✓
1954	Johnston Murray (D)	James E. Berry (D)	John D. Conner (D)	Mac Q. Williamson (D)	Wilburn Cartwright (D)	Scott Burson (D)	A. S. J. Shaw (D)	Oliver Hodge (D)	Jim Hughes (D)	Donald F. Dickey (D)	38D, 6R	104D, 20R	3D	Robert S. Kerr (D)	Mike Monroney (D)	5D, 1R	Eisenhower/ Nixon (R); ✓
1955	Raymond D. Gary (D)	Cowboy Pink Williams (D)	Andy Anderson (D)	Mac Q. Williamson (D)	A. S. J. Shaw (D)	Scott Burson (D)	John D. Conner (D)	Oliver Hodge (D)	Jim Hughes (D)	Joe B. Hunt (D)	39D, 5R	102D, 19R	3D	Robert S. Kerr (D)	Mike Monroney (D)	5D, 1R	Eisenhower/ Nixon (R); ✓
1956	Raymond D. Gary (D)	Cowboy Pink Williams (D)	Andy Anderson (D)	Mac Q. Williamson (D)	A. S. J. Shaw (D)	Scott Burson (D)	John D. Conner (D)	Oliver Hodge (D)	Jim Hughes (D)	Joe B. Hunt (D)	39D, 5R	102D, 19R	3D	Robert S. Kerr (D)	Mike Monroney (D)	5D, 1R	Eisenhower/ Nixon (R); ✓
1957	Raymond D. Gary (D)	Cowboy Pink Williams (D)	Andy Anderson (D)	Mac Q. Williamson (D)	A. S. J. Shaw (D)	Scott Burson (D)	John D. Conner (D)	Oliver Hodge (D)	Jim Hughes (D)	Joe B. Hunt (D)	41D, 3R	101D, 20R	3D	Robert S. Kerr (D)	Mike Monroney (D)	5D, 1R	Eisenhower/ Nixon (R); ✓
1958	Raymond D. Gary (D)	Cowboy Pink Williams (D)	Andy Anderson (D)	Mac Q. Williamson (D)	A. S. J. Shaw (D)	Scott Burson (D)	John D. Conner (D)	Oliver Hodge (D)	Jim Hughes (D)	Joe B. Hunt (D)	41D, 3R	101D, 20R	3D	Robert S. Kerr (D)	Mike Monroney (D)	5D, 1R	Eisenhower/ Nixon (R); ✓
1959	J. Howard Edmondson (D)	George Nigh (D)	John D. Conner (D)	Mac Q. Williamson (D)	Andy Anderson (D)	John M. Rogers (D)	William A. Burkhart (D)	Oliver Hodge (D)	Jim Hughes (D)	Joe B. Hunt (D)	41D, 3R	110D, 9R	3D	Robert S. Kerr (D)	Mike Monroney (D)	5D, 1R	Eisenhower/ Nixon (R); ✓
1960	J. Howard Edmondson (D)	George Nigh (D)	William N. Christian (D)	Mac Q. Williamson (D)	Andy Anderson (D)	John M. Rogers (D)	William A. Burkhart (D)	Oliver Hodge (D)	Jim Hughes (D)	Joe B. Hunt (D)	41D, 3R	110D, 9R	3D	Robert S. Kerr (D)	Mike Monroney (D)	5D, 1R	Nixon/ Lodge (R); ✗
1961	J. Howard Edmondson (D)	George Nigh (D)	William N. Christian (D)	Mac Q. Williamson (D)	Andy Anderson (D)	John M. Rogers (D)	William A. Burkhart (D)	Oliver Hodge (D)	Jim Hughes (D)	Joe B. Hunt (D)	40D, 4R	107D, 14R	3D	Robert S. Kerr (D)	Mike Monroney (D)	5D, 1R	Nixon/ Lodge (R); ✗
1962	J. Howard Edmondson (D)	George Nigh (D)	William N. Christian (D)	Mac Q. Williamson (D)	Andy Anderson (D)	John M. Rogers (D)	William A. Burkhart (D)	Oliver Hodge (D)	Jim Hughes (D)	Joe B. Hunt (D)	40D, 4R	107D, 14R	3D	Robert S. Kerr (D)	Mike Monroney (D)	5D, 1R	Nixon/ Lodge (R); ✗
1963	George Nigh (D)	vacant	James M. Bullard (D)	Charles R. Nesbitt (D)	A. F. Shaw (D)	John M. Rogers (D)	Cowboy Pink Williams (D)	Oliver Hodge (D)	W. T. Hughes (D)	Joe B. Hunt (D)	38D, 6R	96D, 24R	3D	J. Howard Edmondson (D)	Mike Monroney (D)	5D, 1R	Nixon/ Lodge (R); ✗
1963	Henry Bellmon (R)	Leo Winters (D)	James M. Bullard (D)	Charles R. Nesbitt (D)	A. F. Shaw (D)	John M. Rogers (D)	Cowboy Pink Williams (D)	Oliver Hodge (D)	W. T. Hughes (D)	Joe B. Hunt (D)	38D, 6R	96D, 24R	3D	J. Howard Edmondson (D)	Mike Monroney (D)	5D, 1R	Nixon/ Lodge (R); ✗
1964	Henry Bellmon (R)	Leo Winters (D)	James M. Bullard (D)	Charles R. Nesbitt (D)	A. F. Shaw (D)	John M. Rogers (D)	Cowboy Pink Williams (D)	Oliver Hodge (D)	W. T. Hughes (D)	Joe B. Hunt (D)	38D, 6R	96D, 24R	3D	J. Howard Edmondson (D)	Mike Monroney (D)	5D, 1R	Johnson/ Humphrey (D); ✓
1965	Henry Bellmon (R)	Leo Winters (D)	James M. Bullard (D)	Charles R. Nesbitt (D)	A. F. Shaw (D)	John M. Rogers (D)	Cowboy Pink Williams (D)	Oliver Hodge (D)	W. T. Hughes (D)	Joe B. Hunt (D)	41D, 7R	78D, 21R	3D	Fred R. Harris (D)	Mike Monroney (D)	4D, 2R	Johnson/ Humphrey (D); ✓
1966	Henry Bellmon (R)	Leo Winters (D)	James M. Bullard (D)	Charles R. Nesbitt (D)	A. F. Shaw (D)	John M. Rogers (D)	Cowboy Pink Williams (D)	Oliver Hodge (D)	W. T. Hughes (D)	Joe B. Hunt (D)	41D, 7R	78D, 21R	3D	Fred R. Harris (D)	Mike Monroney (D)	4D, 2R	Johnson/ Humphrey (D); ✓
1967	Dewey F. Bartlett (R)	George Nigh (D)	John Rogers (D)	G. T. Blankenship (R)	Joe Bailey Cobb (D)	John M. Rogers (D)	Leo Winters (D)	Oliver Hodge (D)	L. E. Bailey (R)	Joe B. Hunt (D)	39D, 9R	74D, 25R	3D	Fred R. Harris (D)	Mike Monroney (D)	4D, 2R	Johnson/ Humphrey (D); ✓
1968	Dewey F. Bartlett (R)	George Nigh (D)	John Rogers (D)	G. T. Blankenship (R)	Joe Bailey Cobb (D)	John M. Rogers (D)	Leo Winters (D)	Oliver Hodge (D)	L. E. Bailey (R)	Joe B. Hunt (D)	39D, 9R	74D, 25R	3D	Fred R. Harris (D)	Mike Monroney (D)	4D, 2R	Nixon/ Agnew (R) ✓
1969	Dewey F. Bartlett (R)	George Nigh (D)	John Rogers (D)	G. T. Blankenship (R)	Joe Bailey Cobb (D)	John M. Rogers (D)	Leo Winters (D)	Oliver Hodge (D)	L. E. Bailey (R)	Joe B. Hunt (D)	38D, 10R	76D, 23R	3D	Fred R. Harris (D)	Henry Bellmon (R)	4D, 2R	Nixon/ Agnew (R) ✓
1970	Dewey F. Bartlett (R)	George Nigh (D)	John Rogers (D)	G. T. Blankenship (R)	Joe Bailey Cobb (D)	John M. Rogers (D)	Leo Winters (D)	Oliver Hodge (D)	L. E. Bailey (R)	Joe B. Hunt (D)	38D, 10R	76D, 23R	3D	Fred R. Harris (D)	Henry Bellmon (R)	4D, 2R	Nixon/ Agnew (R) ✓
1971	David Hall (D)	George Nigh (D)	John Rogers (D)	Larry Derryberry (D)	Joe Bailey Cobb (D)	John M. Rogers (D)	Leo Winters (D)	Leslie Fisher (D)	Wilbur Wright (D)	Joe B. Hunt (D)	39D, 9R	78D, 21R	3D	Fred R. Harris (D)	Henry Bellmon (R)	4D, 2R	Nixon/ Agnew (R) ✓
1972	David Hall (D)	George Nigh (D)	John Rogers (D)	Larry Derryberry (D)	Joe Bailey Cobb (D)	John M. Rogers (D)	Leo Winters (D)	Leslie Fisher (D)	Wilbur Wright (D)	Joe B. Hunt (D)	39D, 9R	78D, 21R	3D	Fred R. Harris (D)	Henry Bellmon (R)	4D, 2R	Nixon/ Agnew (R) ✓
1973	David Hall (D)	George Nigh (D)	John Rogers (D)	Larry Derryberry (D)	Joe Bailey Cobb (D)	John M. Rogers (D)	Leo Winters (D)	Leslie Fisher (D)	L. P. Williams (D)	Joe B. Hunt (D)	38D, 10R	75D, 26R	3D	Dewey F. Bartlett (R)	Henry Bellmon (R)	5D, 1R	Nixon/ Agnew (R) ✓
1974	David Hall (D)	George Nigh (D)	John Rogers (D)	Larry Derryberry (D)	Joe Bailey Cobb (D)	John M. Rogers (D)	Leo Winters (D)	Leslie Fisher (D)	L. P. Williams (D)	Joe B. Hunt (D)	38D, 10R	75D, 26R	3D	Dewey F. Bartlett (R)	Henry Bellmon (R)	5D, 1R	Nixon/ Agnew (R) ✓
1975	David Boren (D)	George Nigh (D)	John Rogers (D)	Larry Derryberry (D)	Joe Bailey Cobb (D)	John M. Rogers (D)	Leo Winters (D)	Leslie Fisher (D)	Wilbur Wright (D)	Gerald Grimes (D)	39D, 9R	76D, 25R	3D	Dewey F. Bartlett (R)	Henry Bellmon (R)	5D, 1R	Nixon/ Agnew (R) ✓
1976	David Boren (D)	George Nigh (D)	appointed position (Note: After an amendment was passed in 1975, the office was to no longer be elected but, rather, appointed by the Governor. This was to go into effect in 1979, but due to John Roger's early resignation, the amendment de facto went into effect early.)	Larry Derryberry (D)	Joe Bailey Cobb (D)	John M. Rogers (D)	Leo Winters (D)	Leslie Fisher (D)	William E. Foster (D) (Note: Office became an appointed position by the Governor.)	Gerald Grimes (D)	39D, 9R	76D, 25R	3D	Dewey F. Bartlett (R)	Henry Bellmon (R)	5D, 1R	Ford/ Dole (R); ✗
1977	David Boren (D)	George Nigh (D)	appointed position	Larry Derryberry (D)	Joe Bailey Cobb (D)	John M. Rogers (D)	Leo Winters (D)	Leslie Fisher (D)	William E. Foster (D)	Gerald Grimes (D)	39D, 9R	78D, 23R	3D	Dewey F. Bartlett (R)	Henry Bellmon (R)	5D, 1R	Ford/ Dole (R); ✗
1978	David Boren (D)	George Nigh (D)	appointed position	Larry Derryberry (D)	Ray Parr (D)	John M. Rogers (D)	Leo Winters (D)	Leslie Fisher (D)	William E. Foster (D)	Gerald Grimes (D)	39D, 9R	78D, 23R	3D	Dewey F. Bartlett (R)	Henry Bellmon (R)	5D, 1R	Ford/ Dole (R); ✗

== 1979–present ==
Year	Executive offices								State Legislature		Corp. Comm.	United States Congress			Electoral votes
Year	Governor	Lt. Governor	Attorney General	Auditor & Inspector	Treasurer	Supt. of Pub. Inst.	Labor Comm.	Ins. Comm.	Senate	House	Corp. Comm.	Senator (Class II)	Senator (Class III)	House	Electoral votes
1979	George Nigh (D)	Spencer Bernard (D)	Jan Eric Cartwright (D)	Tom Daxon (R)	Leo Winters (D)	Leslie Fisher (D)	William R. Paulk (D)	Gerald Grimes (D)	39D, 9R	75D, 26R	3D	David Boren (D)	Henry Bellmon (R)	5D, 1R	
1980	George Nigh (D)	Spencer Bernard (D)	Jan Eric Cartwright (D)	Tom Daxon (R)	Leo Winters (D)	Leslie Fisher (D)	William R. Paulk (D)	Gerald Grimes (D)	39D, 9R	75D, 26R	3D	David Boren (D)	Henry Bellmon (R)	5D, 1R	Reagan/ Bush (R); ✓
1981	George Nigh (D)	Spencer Bernard (D)	Jan Eric Cartwright (D)	Tom Daxon (R)	Leo Winters (D)	Leslie Fisher (D)	William R. Paulk (D)	Gerald Grimes (D)	37D, 11R	73D, 28R	3D	David Boren (D)	Don Nickles (R)	5D, 1R	Reagan/ Bush (R); ✓
1982	George Nigh (D)	Spencer Bernard (D)	Jan Eric Cartwright (D)	Tom Daxon (R)	Leo Winters (D)	Leslie Fisher (D)	William R. Paulk (D)	Gerald Grimes (D)	37D, 11R	73D, 28R	3D	David Boren (D)	Don Nickles (R)	5D, 1R	Reagan/ Bush (R); ✓
1983	George Nigh (D)	Spencer Bernard (D)	Mike Turpen (D)	Clifton Scott (D)	Leo Winters (D)	Leslie Fisher (D)	William R. Paulk (D)	Gerald Grimes (D)	34D, 14R	76D, 25R	3D	David Boren (D)	Don Nickles (R)	5D, 1R	Reagan/ Bush (R); ✓
1984	George Nigh (D)	Spencer Bernard (D)	Mike Turpen (D)	Clifton Scott (D)	Leo Winters (D)	Leslie Fisher (D)	William R. Paulk (D)	Gerald Grimes (D)	34D, 14R	76D, 25R	3D	David Boren (D)	Don Nickles (R)	5D, 1R	Reagan/ Bush (R); ✓
1985	George Nigh (D)	Spencer Bernard (D)	Mike Turpen (D)	Clifton Scott (D)	Leo Winters (D)	John M. Folks (D)	William R. Paulk (D)	Gerald Grimes (D)	34D, 14R	70D, 31R	3D	David Boren (D)	Don Nickles (R)	5D, 1R	Reagan/ Bush (R); ✓
1986	George Nigh (D)	Spencer Bernard (D)	Mike Turpen (D)	Clifton Scott (D)	Leo Winters (D)	John M. Folks (D)	William R. Paulk (D)	Gerald Grimes (D)	34D, 14R	70D, 31R	3D	David Boren (D)	Don Nickles (R)	5D, 1R	Reagan/ Bush (R); ✓
1987	Henry Bellmon (R)	Robert S. Kerr III (D)	Robert Harlan Henry (D)	Clifton Scott (D)	Ellis Edwards (D)	John M. Folks (D)	Dean Calhoon (R)	Gerald Grimes (D)	31D, 17R	70D, 31R	3D	David Boren (D)	Don Nickles (R)	4D, 2R	Reagan/ Bush (R); ✓
1988	Henry Bellmon (R)	Robert S. Kerr III (D)	Robert Harlan Henry (D)	Clifton Scott (D)	Ellis Edwards (D)	John M. Folks (D)	Dean Calhoon (R)	Gerald Grimes (D)	31D, 17R	70D, 31R	3D	David Boren (D)	Don Nickles (R)	4D, 2R	Bush/ Quayle (R); ✓
1989	Henry Bellmon (R)	Robert S. Kerr III (D)	Robert Harlan Henry (D)	Clifton Scott (D)	Ellis Edwards (D)	Gerald Hoeltzel (R)	Dean Calhoon (R)	Gerald Grimes (D)	33D, 15R	69D, 32R	2D, 1R	David Boren (D)	Don Nickles (R)	4D, 2R	Bush/ Quayle (R); ✓
1990	Henry Bellmon (R)	Robert S. Kerr III (D)	Robert Harlan Henry (D)	Clifton Scott (D)	Ellis Edwards (D)	Gerald Hoeltzel (R)	Ira Phillips (R)	Gerald Grimes (D)	33D, 15R	69D, 32R	2D, 1R	David Boren (D)	Don Nickles (R)	4D, 2R	Bush/ Quayle (R); ✓
1991	David Walters (D)	Jack Mildren (D)	Susan B. Loving (D)	Clifton Scott (D)	Claudette Henry (R)	Sandy Garrett (D)	Dave Renfro (D) (Note: Office became an elected statewide position again.)	Gerald Grimes (D)	37D, 11R	69D, 32R	2R, 1D	David Boren (D)	Don Nickles (R)	4D, 2R	Bush/ Quayle (R); ✓
1992	David Walters (D)	Jack Mildren (D)	Susan B. Loving (D)	Clifton Scott (D)	Claudette Henry (R)	Sandy Garrett (D)	Dave Renfro (D)	Cathy Weatherford (D)	37D, 11R	69D, 32R	2R, 1D	David Boren (D)	Don Nickles (R)	4D, 2R	Bush/ Quayle (R); ✗
1993	David Walters (D)	Jack Mildren (D)	Susan B. Loving (D)	Clifton Scott (D)	Claudette Henry (R)	Sandy Garrett (D)	Dave Renfro (D)	Cathy Weatherford (D)	37D, 11R	68D, 33R	2R, 1D	David Boren (D)	Don Nickles (R)	4D, 2R	Bush/ Quayle (R); ✗
1994	David Walters (D)	Jack Mildren (D)	Susan B. Loving (D)	Clifton Scott (D)	Claudette Henry (R)	Sandy Garrett (D)	Dave Renfro (D)	Cathy Weatherford (D)	37D, 11R	68D, 33R	2R, 1D	David Boren (D)	Don Nickles (R)	4D, 2R	Bush/ Quayle (R); ✗
1994	David Walters (D)	Jack Mildren (D)	Susan B. Loving (D)	Clifton Scott (D)	Claudette Henry (R)	Sandy Garrett (D)	Dave Renfro (D)	Cathy Weatherford (D)	37D, 11R	68D, 33R	2R, 1D	Jim Inhofe (R) (Note: Elected in special election in November 1994 to succeed Boren.)	Don Nickles (R)	3R, 3D (Note: Frank Lucas, a Republican won a special election in May to succeed Democrat Glenn English.)	Bush/ Quayle (R); ✗
1995	Frank Keating (R)	Mary Fallin (R)	Drew Edmondson (D)	Clifton Scott (D)	Robert Butkin (D)	Sandy Garrett (D)	Brenda Reneau (R)	John P. Crawford (R)	35D, 13R	65D, 36R	2R, 1D	Jim Inhofe (R)	Don Nickles (R)	5R, 1D	Bush/ Quayle (R); ✗
1996	Frank Keating (R)	Mary Fallin (R)	Drew Edmondson (D)	Clifton Scott (D)	Robert Butkin (D)	Sandy Garrett (D)	Brenda Reneau (R)	John P. Crawford (R)	35D, 13R	65D, 36R	2R, 1D	Jim Inhofe (R)	Don Nickles (R)	5R, 1D	Dole/ Kemp (R); ✗
1997	Frank Keating (R)	Mary Fallin (R)	Drew Edmondson (D)	Clifton Scott (D)	Robert Butkin (D)	Sandy Garrett (D)	Brenda Reneau (R)	John P. Crawford (R)	33D, 15R	65D, 36R	3R (Note: Democratic Corporation Commissioner Cody L. Graves resigned; Denise Bode, a Republican, was appointed by Gov. Keating to replace him.)	Jim Inhofe (R)	Don Nickles (R)	6R	Dole/ Kemp (R); ✗
1998	Frank Keating (R)	Mary Fallin (R)	Drew Edmondson (D)	Clifton Scott (D)	Robert Butkin (D)	Sandy Garrett (D)	Brenda Reneau (R)	John P. Crawford (R)	33D, 15R	65D, 36R	3R	Jim Inhofe (R)	Don Nickles (R)	6R	Dole/ Kemp (R); ✗
1999	Frank Keating (R)	Mary Fallin (R)	Drew Edmondson (D)	Clifton Scott (D)	Robert Butkin (D)	Sandy Garrett (D)	Brenda Reneau (R)	Carroll Fisher	33D, 15R	61D, 40R	3R	Jim Inhofe (R)	Don Nickles (R)	6R	Dole/ Kemp (R); ✗
2000	Frank Keating (R)	Mary Fallin (R)	Drew Edmondson (D)	Clifton Scott (D)	Robert Butkin (D)	Sandy Garrett (D)	Brenda Reneau (R)	Carroll Fisher	33D, 15R	61D, 40R	3R	Jim Inhofe (R)	Don Nickles (R)	6R	Bush/ Cheney (R); ✓
2001	Frank Keating (R)	Mary Fallin (R)	Drew Edmondson (D)	Clifton Scott (D)	Robert Butkin (D)	Sandy Garrett (D)	Brenda Reneau (R)	Carroll Fisher	30D, 18R	53D, 48R	3R	Jim Inhofe (R)	Don Nickles (R)	5R, 1D	Bush/ Cheney (R); ✓
2002	Frank Keating (R)	Mary Fallin (R)	Drew Edmondson (D)	Clifton Scott (D)	Robert Butkin (D)	Sandy Garrett (D)	Brenda Reneau (R)	Carroll Fisher	30D, 18R	53D, 48R	3R	Jim Inhofe (R)	Don Nickles (R)	5R, 1D	Bush/ Cheney (R); ✓
2003	Brad Henry (D)	Mary Fallin (R)	Drew Edmondson (D)	Jeff McMahan (D)	Robert Butkin (D)	Sandy Garrett (D)	Brenda Reneau (R)	Carroll Fisher	28D, 20R	53D, 48R	3R	Jim Inhofe (R)	Don Nickles (R)	4R, 1D	Bush/ Cheney (R); ✓
2004	Brad Henry (D)	Mary Fallin (R)	Drew Edmondson (D)	Jeff McMahan (D)	Robert Butkin (D)	Sandy Garrett (D)	Brenda Reneau (R)	Carroll Fisher	28D, 20R	53D, 48R	3R	Jim Inhofe (R)	Don Nickles (R)	4R, 1D	Bush/ Cheney (R); ✓
2005	Brad Henry (D)	Mary Fallin (R)	Drew Edmondson (D)	Jeff McMahan (D)	Robert Butkin (D)	Sandy Garrett (D)	Brenda Reneau (R)	Carroll Fisher	26D, 22R	57R, 44D	3R	Jim Inhofe (R)	Tom Coburn (R)	4R, 1D	Bush/ Cheney (R); ✓
2005	Brad Henry (D)	Mary Fallin (R)	Drew Edmondson (D)	Jeff McMahan (D)	Scott Meacham (D)	Sandy Garrett (D)	Brenda Reneau (R)	Kim Holland (D)	26D, 22R	57R, 44D	3R	Jim Inhofe (R)	Tom Coburn (R)	4R, 1D	Bush/ Cheney (R); ✓
2006	Brad Henry (D)	Mary Fallin (R)	Drew Edmondson (D)	Jeff McMahan (D)	Scott Meacham (D)	Sandy Garrett (D)	Brenda Reneau (R)	Kim Holland (D)	25D, 23R (Note: A Republican, Mike Schulz, won a special election in May in District 38 to succeed Democrat Robert M. Kerr, flipping the seat.)	57R, 44D	3R	Jim Inhofe (R)	Tom Coburn (R)	4R, 1D	Bush/ Cheney (R); ✓
2006	Brad Henry (D)	Mary Fallin (R)	Drew Edmondson (D)	Jeff McMahan (D)	Scott Meacham (D)	Sandy Garrett (D)	Brenda Reneau (R)	Kim Holland (D)	26D, 22R (Note: Nancy Riley of District 37 switched parties from Republican to Democratic in August after losing the Lt. Gubernatorial primary.)	57R, 44D	3R	Jim Inhofe (R)	Tom Coburn (R)	4R, 1D	Bush/ Cheney (R); ✓
2007	Brad Henry (D)	Jari Askins (D)	Drew Edmondson (D)	Jeff McMahan (D)	Scott Meacham (D)	Sandy Garrett (D)	Lloyd Fields (D)	Kim Holland (D)	24D, 24R	57R, 44D	2R, 1D (Note: Republican Corporation Commissioner Denise Bode resigned; Jim Roth, a Democrat, was appointed by Gov. Henry to replace him.)	Jim Inhofe (R)	Tom Coburn (R)	4R, 1D	Bush/ Cheney (R); ✓
2008	Brad Henry (D)	Jari Askins (D)	Drew Edmondson (D)	Jeff McMahan (D)	Scott Meacham (D)	Sandy Garrett (D)	Lloyd Fields (D)	Kim Holland (D)	24D, 24R	57R, 44D	2R, 1D	Jim Inhofe (R)	Tom Coburn (R)	4R, 1D	McCain/ Palin (R); ✗
2008	Brad Henry (D)	Jari Askins (D)	Drew Edmondson (D)	Steve Burrage (D)	Scott Meacham (D)	Sandy Garrett (D)	Lloyd Fields (D)	Kim Holland (D)	24D, 24R	57R, 44D	2R, 1D	Jim Inhofe (R)	Tom Coburn (R)	4R, 1D	McCain/ Palin (R); ✗
2009	Brad Henry (D)	Jari Askins (D)	Drew Edmondson (D)	Steve Burrage (D)	Scott Meacham (D)	Sandy Garrett (D)	Lloyd Fields (D)	Kim Holland (D)	26R, 22D	61R, 40D	3R	Jim Inhofe (R)	Tom Coburn (R)	4R, 1D	McCain/ Palin (R); ✗
2010	Brad Henry (D)	Jari Askins (D)	Drew Edmondson (D)	Steve Burrage (D)	Scott Meacham (D)	Sandy Garrett (D)	Lloyd Fields (D)	Kim Holland (D)	26R, 22D	62R, 39D (Note: A Republican, Todd Russ, won a special election to succeed Ryan McMullen, a Democrat who resigned to take an appointment in the U.S. Department of Agriculture.)	3R	Jim Inhofe (R)	Tom Coburn (R)	4R, 1D	McCain/ Palin (R); ✗
2011	Mary Fallin (R)	Todd Lamb (R)	Scott Pruitt (R) (Note: Resigned after being appointed Administrator of the Environmental Protection Agency.)	Gary Jones (R)	Ken A. Miller (R)	Janet Barresi (R)	Mark Costello (R)	John D. Doak (R)	32R, 16D	70R, 31D	3R	Jim Inhofe (R)	Tom Coburn (R)	4R, 1D	McCain/ Palin (R); ✗
2012	Mary Fallin (R)	Todd Lamb (R)	Scott Pruitt (R)	Gary Jones (R)	Ken A. Miller (R)	Janet Barresi (R)	Mark Costello (R)	John D. Doak (R)	32R, 16D	67R, 31D, 3 vac.	3R	Jim Inhofe (R)	Tom Coburn (R)	4R, 1D	Romney/ Ryan (R); ✗
2013	Mary Fallin (R)	Todd Lamb (R)	Scott Pruitt (R)	Gary Jones (R)	Ken A. Miller (R)	Janet Barresi (R)	Mark Costello (R)	John D. Doak (R)	36R, 12D	72R, 29D	3R	Jim Inhofe (R)	Tom Coburn (R)	5R	Romney/ Ryan (R); ✗
2014	Mary Fallin (R)	Todd Lamb (R)	Scott Pruitt (R)	Gary Jones (R)	Ken A. Miller (R)	Janet Barresi (R)	Mark Costello (R)	John D. Doak (R)	36R, 12D	72R, 29D	3R	Jim Inhofe (R)	Tom Coburn (R)	5R	Romney/ Ryan (R); ✗
2015	Mary Fallin (R)	Todd Lamb (R)	Scott Pruitt (R)	Gary Jones (R)	Ken A. Miller (R)	Joy Hofmeister (R)	Mark Costello (R)	John D. Doak (R)	40R, 8D	72R, 29D	3R	Jim Inhofe (R)	James Lankford (R)	5R	Romney/ Ryan (R); ✗
2016	Mary Fallin (R)	Todd Lamb (R)	Scott Pruitt (R)	Gary Jones (R)	Ken A. Miller (R)	Joy Hofmeister (R)	Melissa McLawhorn Houston (R)	John D. Doak (R)	39R, 9D (Note: A Democrat, J. J. Dossett, won a special election vacated after Rick Brinkley, a Republican, resigned his seat after being charged with embezzlement from the Better Business Bureau.)	71R, 30D (Note: A Democrat, Cyndi Munson, won a special election after David Dank, the Republican incumbent, died.)	3R	Jim Inhofe (R)	James Lankford (R)	5R	Trump/ Pence (R); ✓
2017	Mary Fallin (R)	Todd Lamb (R)	Michael J. Hunter (R) (Note: Appointed to replace Pruitt. Kara Rodriguez (R) was acting Attorney General from February 17–20.)	Gary Jones (R)	Ken A. Miller (R)	Joy Hofmeister (R)	Melissa McLawhorn Houston (R)	John D. Doak (R)	42R, 6D	75R, 26D	3R	Jim Inhofe (R)	James Lankford (R)	5R	Trump/ Pence (R); ✓
2018	Mary Fallin (R)	Todd Lamb (R)	Michael J. Hunter (R)	Gary Jones (R)	Ken A. Miller (R)	Joy Hofmeister (R)	Melissa McLawhorn Houston (R)	John D. Doak (R)	42R, 6D	75R, 26D	3R	Jim Inhofe (R)	James Lankford (R)	5R	Trump/ Pence (R); ✓
2019	Kevin Stitt (R)	Matt Pinnell (R)	Michael J. Hunter (R)	Cindy Byrd (R)	Randy McDaniel (R)	Joy Hofmeister (R)	Leslie Osborn (R)	Glen Mulready (R)	39R, 9D	77R, 24D	3R	Jim Inhofe (R)	James Lankford (R)	4R, 1D	Trump/ Pence (R); ✓
2020	Kevin Stitt (R)	Matt Pinnell (R)	Michael J. Hunter (R)	Cindy Byrd (R)	Randy McDaniel (R)	Joy Hofmeister (R)	Leslie Osborn (R)	Glen Mulready (R)	39R, 9D	77R, 24D	3R	Jim Inhofe (R)	James Lankford (R)	4R, 1D	Trump/ Pence (R); ✗
2021	Kevin Stitt (R)	Matt Pinnell (R)	John M. O'Connor (R)	Cindy Byrd (R)	Randy McDaniel (R)	Joy Hofmeister (D) (Note: Switched parties from Republican to Democratic on October 7, 2021.)	Leslie Osborn (R)	Glen Mulready (R)	39R, 9D	82R, 19D	3R	Jim Inhofe (R)	James Lankford (R)	5R	Trump/ Pence (R); ✗
2022	Kevin Stitt (R)	Matt Pinnell (R)	John M. O'Connor (R)	Cindy Byrd (R)	Randy McDaniel (R)	Joy Hofmeister (D)	Leslie Osborn (R)	Glen Mulready (R)	39R, 9D	82R, 19D	3R	Jim Inhofe (R)	James Lankford (R)	5R	Trump/ Pence (R); ✗
2023	Kevin Stitt (R)	Matt Pinnell (R)	Gentner Drummond (R)	Cindy Byrd (R)	Todd Russ (R)	Ryan Walters (R)	Leslie Osborn (R)	Glen Mulready (R)	40R, 8D	81R, 20D	3R	Markwayne Mullin (R) (Note: Elected in special election in November 2022 to succeed Inhofe.)	James Lankford (R)	5R	Trump/ Pence (R); ✗
2024	Kevin Stitt (R)	Matt Pinnell (R)	Gentner Drummond (R)	Cindy Byrd (R)	Todd Russ (R)	Ryan Walters (R)	Leslie Osborn (R)	Glen Mulready (R)	40R, 8D	81R, 20D	3R	Markwayne Mullin (R)	James Lankford (R)	5R	Trump/ Vance (R); ✓
2025	Kevin Stitt (R)	Matt Pinnell (R)	Gentner Drummond (R)	Cindy Byrd (R)	Todd Russ (R)	Ryan Walters (R)	Leslie Osborn (R)	Glen Mulready (R)	40R, 8D	81R, 20D	3R	Markwayne Mullin (R)	James Lankford (R)	5R	Trump/ Vance (R); ✓
2026	Kevin Stitt (R)	Matt Pinnell (R)	Gentner Drummond (R)	Cindy Byrd (R)	Todd Russ (R)	Lindel Fields (R)	Leslie Osborn (I) (Note: Switched parties from Republican to Independent by October 9, 2026.)	Glen Mulready (R)	40R, 8D	81R, 20D	3R	Alan Armstrong (R)	James Lankford (R)	5R	Trump/ Vance (R); ✓
2027	Mike Mazzei (R)	T. W. Shannon (R)	Jon Echols (R)	Melissa Capps (R)	Cindy Byrd (R)	Robert Franklin (R)	Kevin West (R)	Bob Sullivan (R)	40R, 8D	75R, 26D	3R	Kevin Hern (R)	James Lankford (R)	5R	Trump/ Vance (R); ✓

== See also ==
- Law and government in Oklahoma
- Politics of Oklahoma
- Elections in Oklahoma
