= Michael Donnelly =

Michael or Mike Donnelly may refer to:

- Michael Donnelly (politician), Irish Fianna Fáil Senator from 1977 to 1981
- Michael Donnelly (veteran) (1959–2005), United States Air Force (USAF) and advocate of veterans of the Gulf war
- Michael P. Donnelly (judge) (born 1966), American judge
- Michael P. Donnelly (admiral), United States Navy admiral and naval flight officer
- Michael Donnelly (Santa Barbara), a fictional character from Santa Barbara
- Mike Donnelly (born 1963), American ice hockey player
- Mike Donnelly (American football), American college football coach
- Mike Donnelly (politician) (1880–1972), American politician, Mayor of Oklahoma City in 1923
- Micky Donnelly (1952–2019), Northern Irish painter

== See also ==
- Mickey Donnelly (disambiguation)
