= Mickey Donnelly =

Mickey Donnelly may refer to:

- Mickey Donnelly (footballer), for Cliftonville F.C.
- Mickey Donnelly, musician in Spear of Destiny (band)

== See also ==
- Michael Donnelly (disambiguation)
- Micky Donnelly, Northern Irish artist
