= Governor Walton =

Governor Walton may refer to:

- George Walton (1749–1804), Governor of Georgia from 1779 to 1780 and from 1789 to 1790
- Jack C. Walton (1881–1949), 5th Governor of Oklahoma in 1923
