= Gladys Warren =

American politician (1911–1984)

14th Oklahoma State Auditor
- In office July 10, 1954 – January 1955
- Appointed by: Johnston Murray
- Governor: Johnston Murray
- Preceded by: Wilburn Cartwright
- Succeeded by: A. S. J. Shaw

Personal details
- Born: Gladys Earl Rogers; August 24, 1911 Brinkman, Oklahoma, United States
- Died: October 28, 1984 (aged 73) Oklahoma City, Oklahoma, United States
- Party: Democratic Party
- Education: Oklahoma State University

Gladys Earl Rogers Warren (August 24, 1911 – October 28, 1984) was an American politician who served as the Oklahoma State Auditor from July 10, 1954, to January 1955.

== Biography ==
Gladys Earl Rogers Warren was born on August 24, 1911, in Brinkman, Oklahoma, to Earl Hope and Mallie Moore Rogers. She graduated from Brinkman High School and married William Carl Warren on June 19, 1932. She graduated from Oklahoma State University in 1937. From 1953 to 1954 she served on the board of regents for the Oklahoma College for Women. On July 10, 1954, she was appointed Oklahoma State Auditor by Governor Johnston Murray. She was a member of the Democratic Party and succeeded Wilburn Cartwright after he resigned from office. In July 1971, Governor David Hall appointed her to the Oklahoma Bicentennial Commission. In 1978, she ran for Lieutenant Governor of Oklahoma and advanced to a runoff alongside Spencer Bernard. She lost the runoff, but was the first woman to advance to a runoff election for a statewide office in Oklahoma. She died on October 28, 1984, in Oklahoma City.
