= Charles C. Childers =

American politician in Oklahoma

Charles Clarence Childers
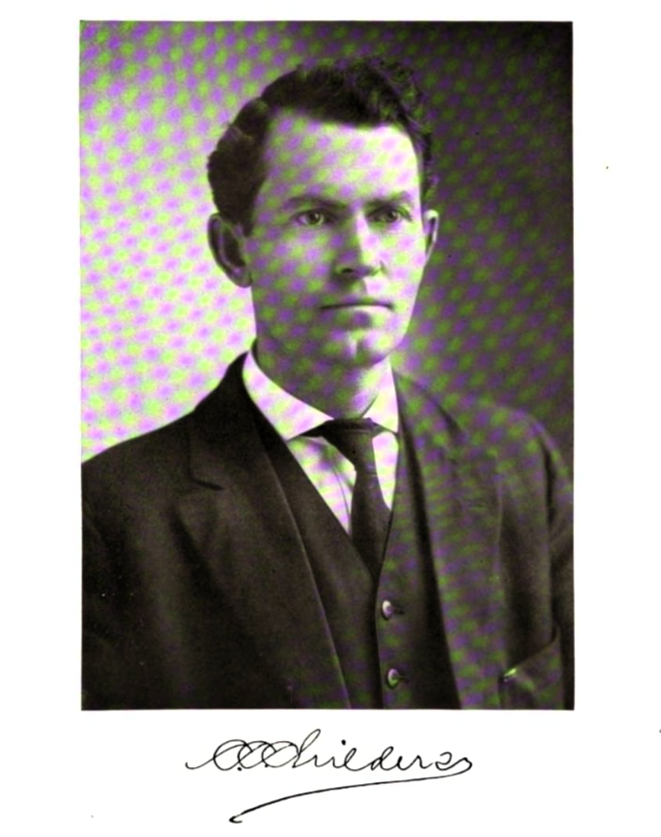
- Childers circa. 1916

Oklahoma Secretary of State
- In office January 1939 – January 1943
- Governor: Leon C. Phillips
- Preceded by: Frank C. Carter
- Succeeded by: Frank C. Carter

Oklahoma State Auditor
- In office January 1943 – January 1947
- Governor: Robert S. Kerr
- Preceded by: Frank C. Carter
- Succeeded by: A. S. J. Shaw
- In office January 1935 – January 1939
- Governor: E. W. Marland
- Preceded by: Frank C. Carter
- Succeeded by: Frank C. Carter
- In office January 1923 – January 1927
- Governor: Jack C. Walton; Martin E. Trapp
- Preceded by: Frank C. Carter
- Succeeded by: A. S. J. Shaw

Oklahoma Corporation Commissioner
- In office January 1927 – January 1933
- Preceded by: E. R. Hughes
- Succeeded by: Jack C. Walton

Member of the Oklahoma House of Representatives from the Garfield County district
- In office November 16, 1912 – November 16, 1916
- Preceded by: J. B. Campbell
- Succeeded by: J. B. Campbell

Personal details
- Born: September 1, 1872 Lawrence County, Arkansas

Charles Clarence Childers was an American politician who served in the Oklahoma House of Representatives representing Garfield County and served three non-consecutive terms as the Oklahoma State Auditor, one term as Oklahoma Secretary of State, and one term on the Oklahoma Corporation Commission.

He was first elected to the Oklahoma House of Representatives between 1912 and 1916. He was the Oklahoma State Auditor from 1923 to 1927, 1935 to 1939, and 1943 to 1947. He also served as the Oklahoma Secretary of State between 1939 and 1943 and on the Oklahoma Corporation Commission between 1929 and 1933.

== Early life, family, and education ==
Charles Clarence Childers was born in Lawrence County, Arkansas, on September 1, 1872, to William Childers and Clara Wells. He attended public schools in Lawrence County before travelling to Memphis, Tennessee, for high school. He attended the University of Arkansas until 1893, leaving his junior year. Upon returning to Lawrence County he was hired by his father, the county sheriff and tax collector, as a clerk. On November 3, 1893, he married Elizabeth Wells. He and Elizabeth were members of the Methodist Episcopal Church, South.

He succeeded his father as sheriff and served two two-year terms. He then was elected county clerk for four years. In 1908, he moved to Oklahoma and settled near Billings.

== Oklahoma politics ==
He served in the 4th and 5th Oklahoma Legislature representing Garfield County in the Oklahoma House of Representatives, winning election in 1912 and 1914. In his first term he was chairman of the Committee on Levees, Ditches, Drains, and Irrigation and he authored successful bills to replace executions by hanging with electrocution and to allow farmers' mutual insurance companies.

In his second term he chaired the Committee on Insurance and authored a bill to allow provide public schools with free textbooks alongside Senator William A. Chase. He also worked on bills to establish a minimum wage for women, increase the duties of the Treasurer of Oklahoma, enable district attorneys to adjust probate matters, created hospitals for railroad workers, and a pension for the widows of men killed in a 1914 prison riot at the Oklahoma State Penitentiary.

Later as Oklahoma State Auditor he testified against Jack C. Walton during his impeachment trial. Walton later defeated Childers, who was the incumbent, in 1932 in the Democratic Party's primary for Oklahoma Corporation Commissioner.

== Electoral history ==
1932 Oklahoma Corporation Commission Democratic primary
Party	Candidate	Votes	%
Democratic	Jack C. Walton	76,485	22.2%
Democratic	A. S. J. Shaw	65,880	19.1%
Democratic	Charles C. Childers (incumbent)	63,154	18.3%
Democratic	I. L. Cook	37,422	10.8%
Democratic	W. C. McAlister	27,845	8.1%
Democratic	George S. Long	26,181	7.6%
Democratic	Fred Davis	8,038	2.3%
Democratic	Theodore S. Wilcox	6,081	1.7%
Democratic	William C. Evans	6,029	1.7%
Democratic	G. A. Jordan	5,866	1.7%
Democratic	Earl Allen	5,696	1.6%
Democratic	Chas. West	5,686	1.6%
Democratic	W. A. Richardson	4,538	1.3%
Democratic	Robert Housaman	2,757	0.8%
Democratic	Thurman A. Tunstall	2,071	0.6%
Total votes		343,729	100.00%
