= E. R. Hughes =

Oklahoma Corporation Commissioner
- In office January 1929 – January 1935
- Preceded by: Frank Carter
- Succeeded by: A. S. J. Shaw
- In office January 1921 – January 1927
- Preceded by: R. E. Echols
- Succeeded by: Charles C. Childers

Personal details
- Party: Republican

E. R. Hughes was an American politician who was the first Republican to serve on the Oklahoma Corporation Commission. He served two nonconsecutive terms from 1921 to 1927 and from 1929 to 1935.

== Biography ==
Hughes was elected to the Oklahoma Corporation Commission in 1920 and 1928. He was the first and only Republican elected to the Oklahoma Corporation Commission until the election of Bob Anthony in 1988. He ran for reelection in 1926. In 1934, he ran for reelection to the Corporation Commission but he withdrew after advancing to a runoff with Frank A. Anderson. After Anderson's primary win state law was changed to require Black candidates be labeled on the ballot as "(Negro)," until the practice was ruled unconstitutional by the United States Court of Appeals for the Tenth Circuit in 1955.
