= R. E. Echols =

American politician

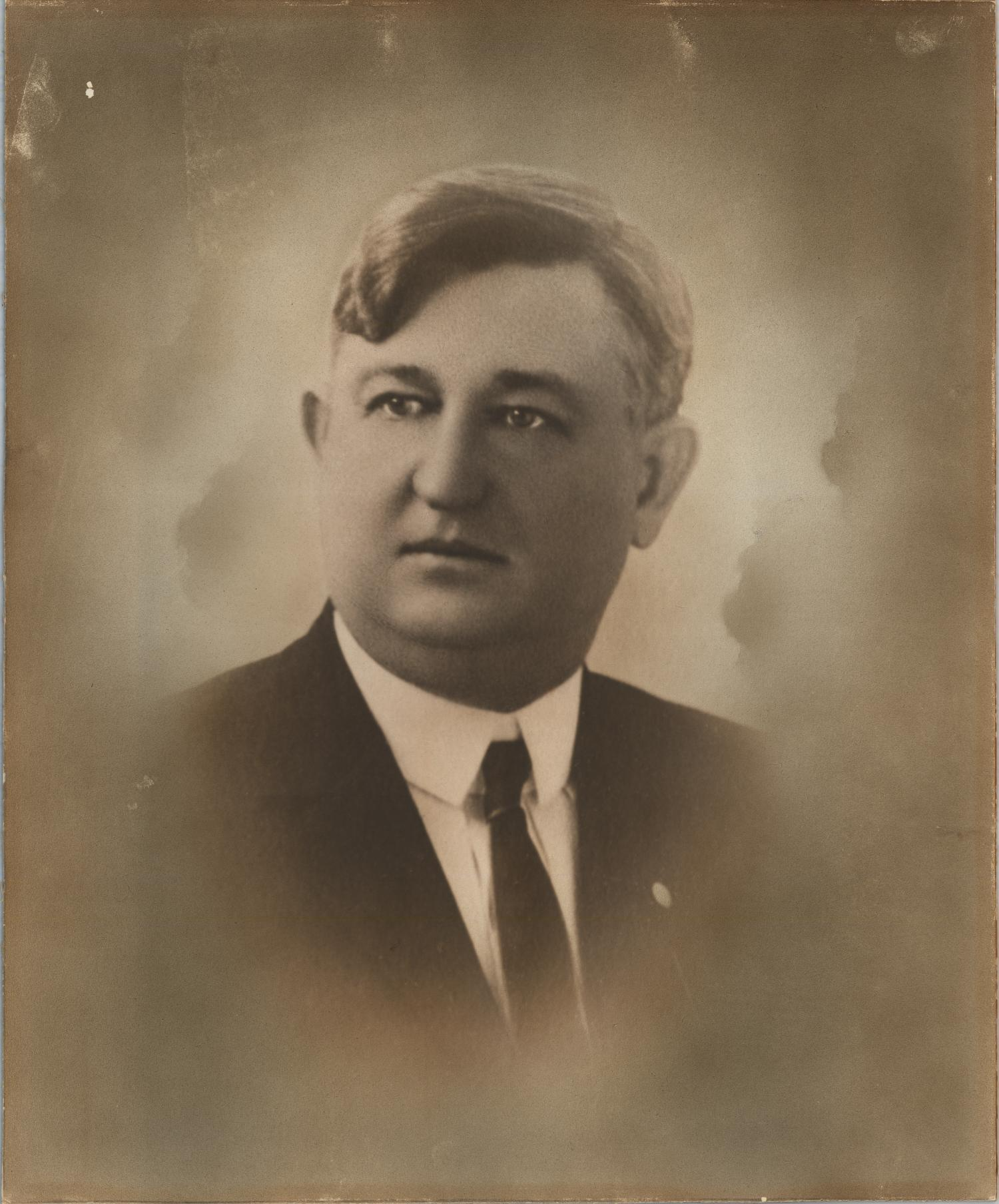
- Echols in 1919 or 1920

Oklahoma Corporation Commissioner
- In office 1919–1920
- Governor: James B. A. Robertson
- Preceded by: Walter Davis Humphrey
- Succeeded by: E. R. Hughes

Member of the Oklahoma Senate from the 2nd district
- In office November 16, 1907 – 1914
- Preceded by: Position established
- Succeeded by: G. E. Wilson

Personal details
- Party: Democratic Party

R. E. Echols was an American politician who served on the Oklahoma Corporation Commission from 1919 to 1920. He also served in the Oklahoma Senate from statehood in 1907 until 1914.

== Biography ==
R. E. Echols was elected to the Oklahoma Senate in 1907 and served until 1914. He was succeeded by G. E. Wilson. In 1919 he was appointed to the Oklahoma Corporation Commission and served until 1920. He was succeeded by E. R. Hughes. He was a member of the Democratic Party.
