= A. S. J. Shaw =

American politician in Oklahoma

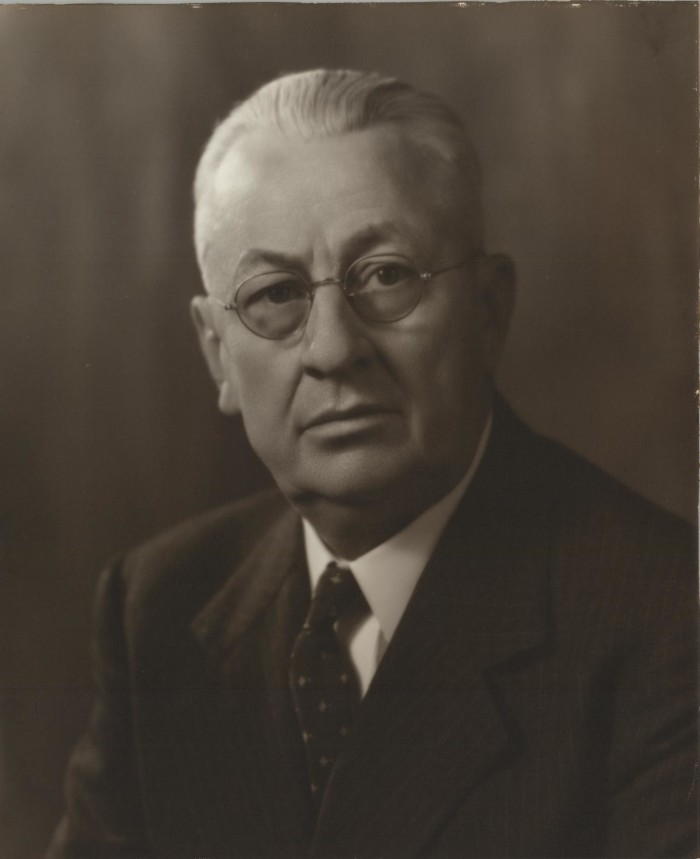

Oklahoma State Auditor
- In office January 10, 1955 – January 1959
- Governor: Raymond D. Gary
- Preceded by: Gladys Warren
- Succeeded by: Andy Elmer Anderson
- In office January 13, 1947 – January 8, 1951
- Governor: Roy J. Turner
- Preceded by: C. C. Childers
- Succeeded by: Wilburn Cartwright
- In office January 10, 1927 – January 1931
- Governor: Henry S. Johnston; William J. Holloway
- Preceded by: C. C. Childers
- Succeeded by: Frank Carter

Oklahoma State Treasurer
- In office January 8, 1951 – January 10, 1955
- Governor: Johnston Murray
- Preceded by: John D. Conner
- Succeeded by: John D. Conner
- In office January 11, 1943 – January 13, 1947
- Governor: Robert S. Kerr
- Preceded by: Carl B. Sebring
- Succeeded by: John D. Conner
- In office January 13, 1923 – January 10, 1927
- Governor: Jack C. Walton; Martin E. Trapp
- Preceded by: A. N. Leecraft
- Succeeded by: Richard A. Sneed

Oklahoma Corporation Commissioner
- In office January 1935 – January 1941
- Preceded by: E. R. Hughes
- Succeeded by: William J. Armstrong

Personal details
- Born: Albert Sidney Johnson Shaw; February 21, 1880 Liberty, Mississippi, U.S.
- Died: February 8, 1969 (aged 88) Oklahoma City, Oklahoma, U.S.
- Party: Democratic Party
- Education: Southwestern University

Albert Sidney Johnson Shaw was an American politician who served in several statewide offices between 1923 and 1959 in Oklahoma.

== Biography ==
Albert Sidney Johnson Shaw was born on February 21, 1880, in Liberty, Mississippi, to Richard James Shaw and Laura Dunn. He graduated from Southwestern University in 1900. He worked as a teacher from 1900 to 1904. On March 31, 1904, he married Daisy V. Aycock, and the couple had four children. He ran an abstract and loan business from 1904 to 1919. From 1919 to 1923, he was secretary to the Oklahoma Commissioners of the Land Office.

A. S. J. Shaw was a member of the Democratic Party in Oklahoma sworn in for a four-year term as the Oklahoma State Treasurer in 1923, 1943, and 1951. He was elected to a six-year term on the Oklahoma Corporation Commission in 1934. He was sworn in for a four-year term as Oklahoma State Auditor in 1927, 1947, and 1955. He died on February 7, 1969, in Oklahoma City.
