= G. E. Wilson =

American politician

George E. Wilson
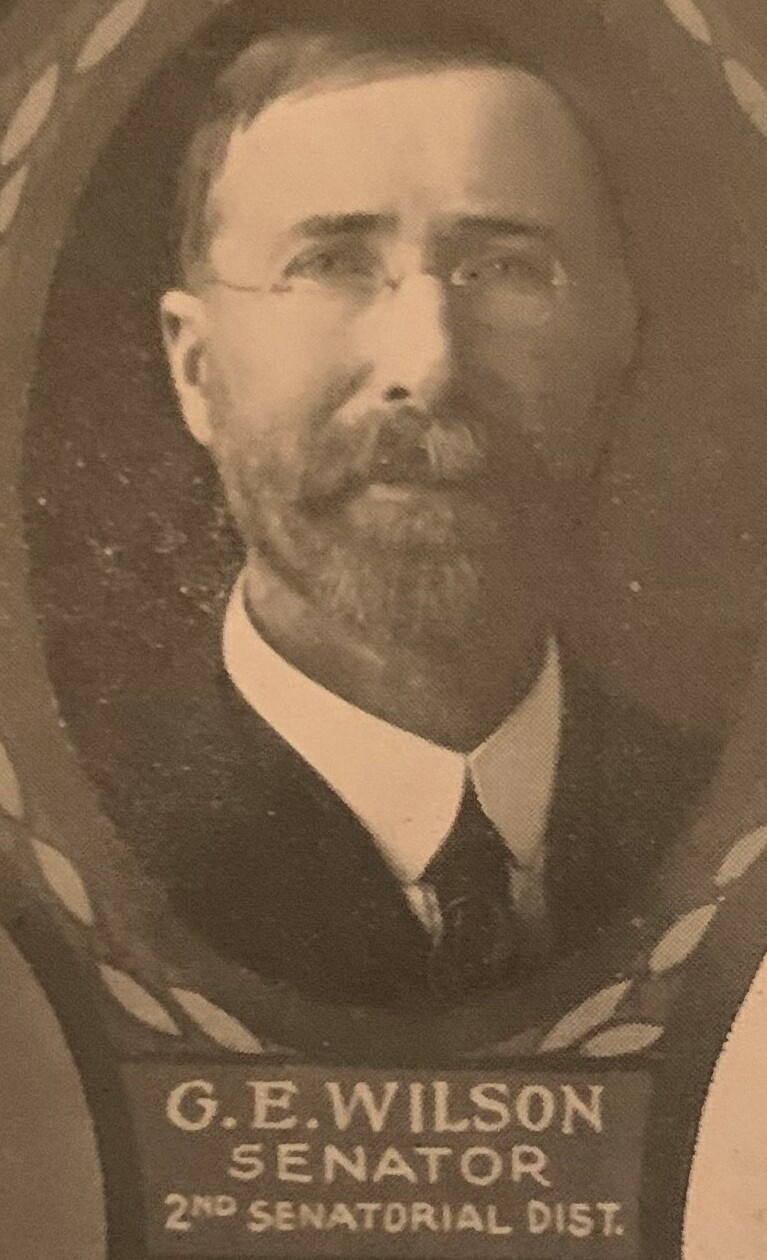

Member of the Oklahoma Senate from the 2nd district
- In office 1914–1918
- Preceded by: R. E. Echols
- Succeeded by: James Spurlock

Personal details
- Party: Socialist

George E. Wilson was an American politician who served as a member of the Oklahoma Senate between 1914 and 1918. He was the only Socialist Party member to win election to the Oklahoma Senate.

== Oklahoma Senate ==
Wilson ran for the Oklahoma Senate in 1914. He won the general election running as a candidate for the Socialist Party. He was the only Socialist Party member to win election to the Oklahoma Senate.
