= Charles A. Taylor (Oklahoma politician) =

American politician

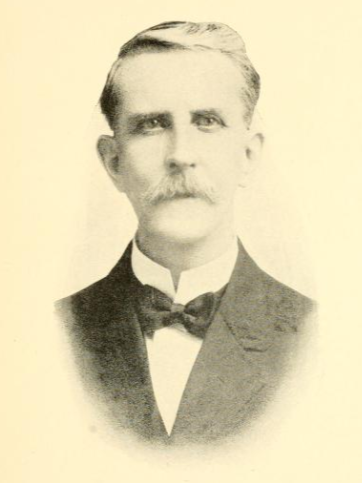

1st Oklahoma State Examiner and Inspector (Note: Prior to 1975, the office of State Examiner and Inspector and State Auditor were separate elected offices. After 1975 they were consolidated into the Oklahoma State Auditor and Inspector.)
- In office November 16, 1907 – July 19, 1912
- Governor: Charles N. Haskell; Lee Cruce
- Preceded by: Position established
- Succeeded by: Fred Parkinson

Personal details
- Born: 1856 Ashburnham, Massachusetts
- Died: July 19, 1912
- Party: Democratic Party

Charles A.Taylor was an American politician who served as the first Oklahoma State Examiner and Inspector from 1907 until his death in 1912.

== Biography ==
Charles A.Taylor was born in 1856 in Ashburnham, Massachusetts. He later moved to Lynn, Massachusetts, and worked as the city engineer. He then moved to Hutchinson, Kansas, where he served as the city and Reno County engineer, before moving again to Pratt County. He served in the Populist administration of Kansas Governor Lorenzo D. Lewelling as the Assistant Superintendent of Public Instruction and Assistant State Auditor. In 1900, he moved to Oklahoma Territory near Pond Creek. In 1907, he was elected Oklahoma's first State Examiner and Inspector and he was re-elected in 1910. He died in office on July 19, 1912, and Fred Parkinson was appointed his successor.

== Electoral history ==
1907 Oklahoma State Examiner election
Party	Candidate	Votes	%	±%
Democratic	Charles A. Taylor	132,821	54.8	New
Republican	John S. Fischer	99,600	41.1	New
Socialist	C.H. Done	9,555	3.9	New
Democratic gain from		Swing	N/A	

Oklahoma State Examiner and Inspector Democratic primary (August 2, 1910)
Party	Candidate	Votes	%
Democratic	Charles A. Taylor (incumbent)	64,439	66.4%
Democratic	Elias Landrum	32,486	33.5%
Turnout		96,925	

1910 Oklahoma State Examiner and Inspector election
Party	Candidate	Votes	%	±%
Democratic	Charles A. Taylor (incumbent)	117,519	50.0%	−4.8%
Republican	W.B. Lain	93,372	39.7%	−1.4%
Socialist	W.S. Webster	23,763	10.1%	+6.2%
Democratic hold		Swing		

== Notes ==
Party political offices
First	Democratic nominee for Oklahoma State Examiner and Inspector; 1907, 1910	Succeeded by Fred Parkinson
