= Mike Donnelly (politician) =

American politician

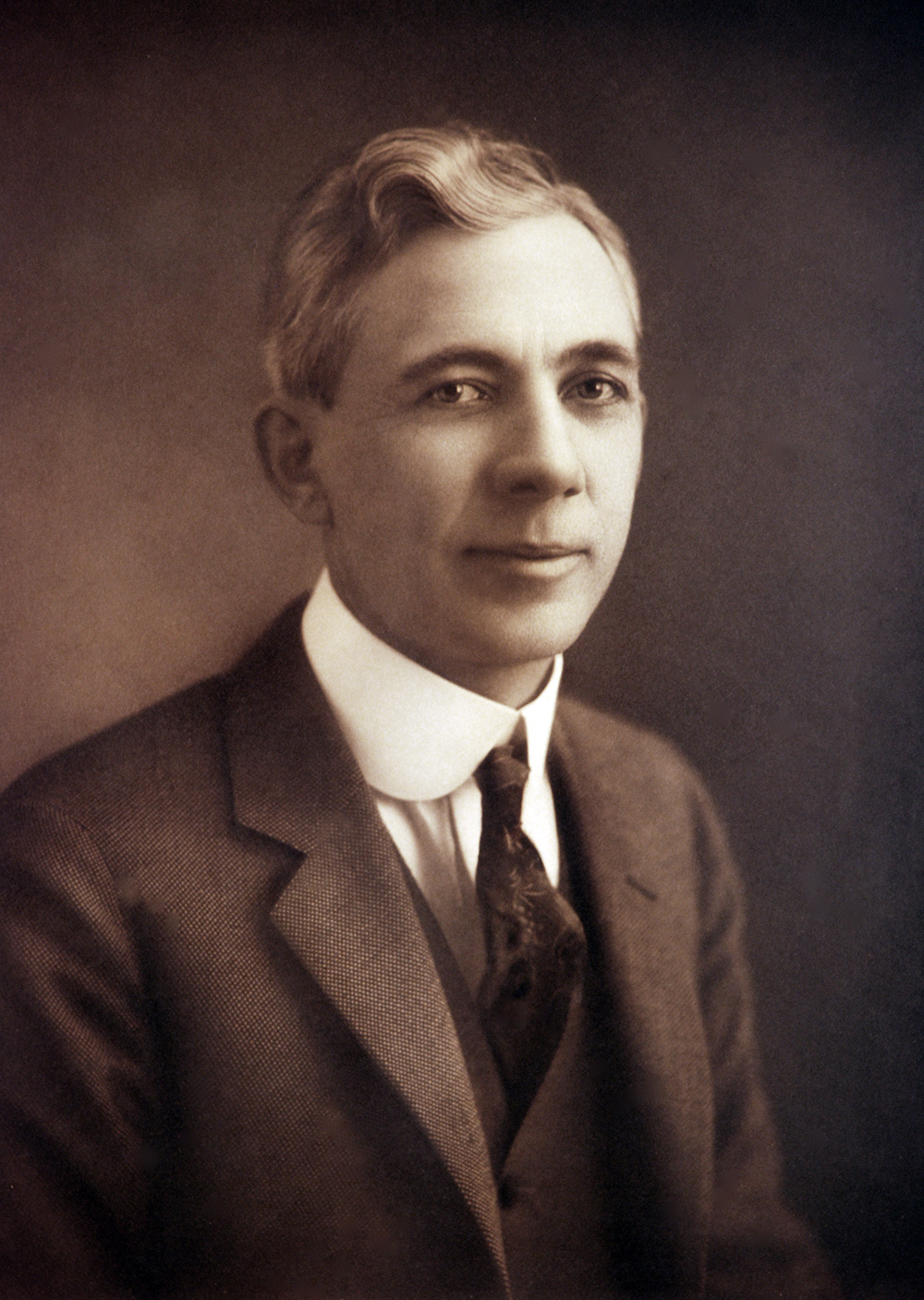
- Donnelly in 1923

Oklahoma County Commissioner
- In office 1934–1948

20th Mayor of Oklahoma City
- In office January 9, 1923 – April 4, 1923
- Preceded by: Jack C. Walton
- Succeeded by: O. A. Cargill

Personal details
- Born: October 14, 1880 Bucklin, Missouri, U.S.
- Died: September 12, 1972 (aged 91) Bethany, Oklahoma, U.S.
- Resting place: Rose Hill Burial Park
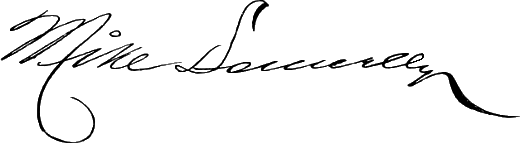
- Signature

Mike Donnelly Sr. (1880–1972) was an American politician who served as Mayor of Oklahoma City in 1923, succeeding Mayor Jack C. Walton who'd been elected governor.

== Biography ==
Mike Donnelly was born on October 14, 1880, in Bucklin, Missouri. He moved to Oklahoma City in 1904 and served as the mayor of Capitol Hill before its annexation by Oklahoma City. He succeeded Jack C. Walton as Mayor of Oklahoma City, serving between January 9, 1923, and April 4, 1923. He later served as an Oklahoma County Commissioner between 1934 and 1948. He also worked for the Oklahoma Highway Department for 16 years.

He died on September 12, 1972, in Bethany, Oklahoma. He was entombed at Rose Hill Burial Park in Oklahoma City.
