= Joseph C. McClelland =

American politician

3rd Oklahoma State Auditor
- In office February 12, 1913 – January 1915
- Appointed by: Lee Cruce
- Preceded by: Leo Meyer
- Succeeded by: Everette B. Howard

Personal details
- Born: Missouri, United States

Joseph C. McClelland was an American politician who served as the 3rd Oklahoma State Auditor. He was appointed by Governor Lee Cruce.

== Biography ==
Joseph C. McClelland was born in Missouri before his family moved to Colorado for his childhood. He later moved to Kansas before settling in Oklahoma Territory in 1893 where he homesteaded in Grant County. Around 1908, he moved to Oklahoma City and worked as a banker.

He was appointed to succeed Leo Meyer as Oklahoma State Auditor by Governor Lee Cruce after Meyer's resignation in 1913. He was appointed on February 12, 1913, and was succeed in office by Everette B. Howard. In 1914, he ran for Oklahoma State Treasurer in the Democratic Party's primary, but lost to William Lee Alexander.
