= Frank Carter (American politician) =

American politician (1862–1954)

Oklahoma Secretary of State
- In office January 1943 – 1945
- Governor: Robert S. Kerr
- Preceded by: Charles C. Childers
- Succeeded by: Katherine Manton
- In office January 1935 – January 1939
- Governor: E. W. Marland
- Preceded by: Richard A. Sneed
- Succeeded by: Charles C. Childers

Oklahoma State Auditor
- In office January 1939 – January 1943
- Governor: Leon C. Phillips
- Preceded by: Charles C. Childers
- Succeeded by: Charles C. Childers
- In office January 1931 – January 1935
- Governor: William H. Murray
- Preceded by: A. S. J. Shaw
- Succeeded by: Charles C. Childers
- In office January 1919 – January 1923
- Governor: James B. A. Robertson
- Preceded by: Everette B. Howard
- Succeeded by: Charles C. Childers

Oklahoma Corporation Commissioner
- In office January 1923 – January 1927
- Preceded by: Campbell Russell
- Succeeded by: E. R. Hughes

Personal details
- Born: 1862
- Died: 1954 (aged 91–92)
- Party: Democratic Party

Frank Carter was an American politician who held several key offices in Oklahoma throughout his career. He was first elected Oklahoma State Auditor in 1918, and later served as the Oklahoma Corporation Commissioner in 1922. Carter returned to the position of State Auditor in 1930 and again in 1938. He also held the office of Oklahoma Secretary of State, serving two non-consecutive terms, first in 1934 and again in 1942.

== Biography ==
Frank C. Carter was born in Texas in 1862. He graduated from Eastman Business College in New York and returned to Texas, where he worked for a lumber company. In 1901, he moved to Frederick, Oklahoma, after the opening of the Kiowa-Comanche-Apache Reservation. Following Oklahoma statehood, Carter served as the sheriff of Tillman County from 1907 to 1913.

Carter's political career in Oklahoma began when he was elected Oklahoma State Auditor in 1918, he went on to serve as the Oklahoma Corporation Commissioner in 1922, before returning to the State Auditor's office in 1930. In 1934, he was elected Oklahoma Secretary of State, a position he held until 1938, when he became State Auditor once again, he was re-elected to the office of Secretary of State in 1942.

Carter died in 1954.
