= Oklahoma Corporation Commission =

Public utilities regulatory body of Oklahoma

- Great Seal of Oklahoma

Agency overview
- Formed: November 16, 1907
- Headquarters: Will Rogers Building 2401 N. Lincoln Blvd Oklahoma City, OK 73105 ** Jim Thorpe Office Building is currently being renovated. **
- Employees: 538
- Annual budget: $170,852,660.00 (FY 2025)
- Ministers responsible: Kim David, Chair of the Commission; Jim Marshall, Interim Director of Administration and Appointing Authority
- Website: Oklahoma Corporation Commission

The Oklahoma Corporation Commission is the public utilities commission of the U.S state of Oklahoma run by three statewide elected commissioners. Authorized to employ more than 500 employees, it regulates oil and gas drilling, utilities and telephone companies.

Investigative reporting has documented persistent failures by the commission to undertake basic monitoring of pollution and health harms, as well as failures to enforce documented instances of violated environmental regulations.

== History ==
The commission was established in 1907 and the First Oklahoma Legislature gave the commission authority to regulate public service corporations.

Railroad, telephone and telegraph companies were the companies first regulated by the commission, which also collected records of the stockholders, officers and directors of corporations chartered or licensed to do business in Oklahoma. Record collection duties were later split; the commission keeping records only for public service companies. The commission added pipelines, water, heat, light and power in early years.

The commission began regulating oil and gas in 1914 and was given additional regulatory power over the industry the following year.

In 2026, ProPublica reported that the Oklahoma Corporation Commission was aware of hundreds of oil wells in Oklahoma that violated environmental regulations, yet the commission continued to let the wells operate. ProPublica documented failures by the commission to undertake basic monitoring and enforcement of pollution and health harms in the state.

== Terms and qualifications ==
Candidates for the commission must be a citizen of Oklahoma for over two years before their election, at least 30 years of age and have no interest in any entity regulated by the commission.

Commissioners serve a six-year term. The terms are staggered so that one commissioner is up for re-election every two years, in even-numbered years. The chair of the commission is determined by the three commissioners.

In case of vacancy the Governor of Oklahoma appoints a replacement, to stand until the next general election. The commissioner elected at that election will serve the remaining unexpired term, so as to maintain the staggered term system.

== Duties ==
The Commission regulates and enforces the laws and supervised the actives associated with:

- The exploration and production of oil and gas
- The storage and dispensing of petroleum based fuels
- The establishment of rates and services of public utilities
- The operation of intrastate transportation
- The administration of the Oklahoma Universal Service Fund for internet to schools, libraries, and qualified health centers.

Early emphasis for the commission was on regulation of railroad routes and rates. Through changes by the Legislature, and the change in services considered essential to the public welfare, the commission presently regulates public utilities, oil and gas industry (exploration, drilling, production and waste disposal), motor carrier transport, and petroleum products industry (transportation, storage, quality and dispensing). The commission also monitors a number of federal programs for compliance in Oklahoma. The commission also oversees the conservation of natural resources, avoiding waste production, abate pollution of the environment, and balancing the rights and needs of the people of Oklahoma with those of the regulated entities. The Public Utility Division acts as the Administrator for the states $30 million Universal Services Fund. This fund supports rural telecommunications as well as internet to Oklahoma public schools, libraries, and health centers.

== Membership ==
Former Oklahoma Secretary of State, Senator, and House Member Brian Bingman won the 2024 Corporation Commissioner statewide vote. His term commenced on January 13, 2025, replacing longtime and longest running incumbent Corporation Commissioner in US history, Bob Anthony. Commissioner Anthony could not rerun for office due to the 12-year term limit enacted in 2010 after voters approved Oklahoma State Question 747. Bingman ran for Corporation Commissioner in 2016 and lost to Anthony after a runoff election.

As of June 2025, the following are the members of the commission:

Class	Name	Since	Next Election	Party
1	Todd Hiett	January 12, 2015	2026 (term limited)	Republican
2	Kim David, Chair	January 9, 2023	2028	Republican
3	Brian Bingman, Vice Chair	January 13, 2025	2030	Republican

=== Former commission panels ===
Years	Seat 2	Seat 1	Seat 3	Balance
1907-1911	J. J. McAlester (D)	A.P. Watson (D)	J.E. Love (D)	3 (D)
1911-1915	George A. Henshaw (D)	A.P. Watson (D)	J.E. Love (D)	3 (D)
1915-1917	George A. Henshaw (D)	Walter Davis Humphrey (D)	J.E. Love (D)	3 (D)
1917-1918	Campbell Russell (D)	Walter Davis Humphrey (D)	J.E. Love (D)	3 (D)
1918-1919	Campbell Russell (D)	Walter Davis Humphrey (D)	Art L. Walker (D)	3 (D)
1919-1920	Campbell Russell (D)	R. E. Echols (D)	Art L. Walker (D)	3 (D)
1921-1922	Campbell Russell (D)	E. R. Hughes (R)	Art L. Walker (D)	2 (D)- 1 (R)
1923-1923	Frank Carter (D)	E. R. Hughes (R)	Art L. Walker (D)	2 (D)- 1 (R)
1923-1925	Frank Carter (D)	E. R. Hughes (R)	Joe B. Cobb (D)	2 (D)- 1 (R)
1925-1926	Frank Carter (D)	E. R. Hughes (R)	Fred Capshaw (D)	2 (D)- 1 (R)
1927-1928	Frank Carter (D)	Charles C. Childers (D)	Fred Capshaw (D)	3 (D)
1929-1930	E. R. Hughes (R)	Charles C. Childers (D)	Fred Capshaw (D)	2 (D)- 1 (R)
1931-1932	E. R. Hughes (R)	Charles C. Childers (D)	Paul A. Walker (D)	2 (D)- 1 (R)
1933-1934	E. R. Hughes (R)	Jack C. Walton (D)	Paul A. Walker (D)	2 (D)- 1 (R)
1934-1935	E. R. Hughes (R)	Jack C. Walton (D)	Reford Bond (D)	2 (D)- 1 (R)
1935-1938	A. S. J. Shaw (D)	Jack C. Walton (D)	Reford Bond (D)	3 (D)
1939-1940	A. S. J. Shaw (D)	Ray O. Weems (D)	Reford Bond (D)	3 (D)
1941-1946	William J. Armstrong (D)	Ray O. Weems (D)	Reford Bond (D)	3 (D)
1947-1954	Ray C. Jones (D)	Ray O. Weems (D)	Reford Bond (D)	3 (D)
1954-1955	Ray C. Jones (D)	Ray O. Weems (D)	Wilburn Cartwright (D)	3 (D)
1955-1969	Ray C. Jones (D)	Harold Freeman (D)	Wilburn Cartwright (D)	3 (D)
1969-1973	Ray C. Jones (D)	Charles R. Nesbitt (D)	Wilburn Cartwright (D)	3 (D)
1973-1975	Ray C. Jones (D)	Charles R. Nesbitt (D)	Rex Privett (D)	3 (D)
1975-1976	Ray C. Jones (D)	Hamp Baker (D)	Rex Privett (D)	3 (D)
1977-1979	Jan Eric Cartwright (D)	Hamp Baker (D)	Rex Privett (D)	3 (D)
1979-1981	Norma Eagleton (D)	Hamp Baker (D)	Bill Dawson (D)	3 (D)
1981-1982	Norma Eagleton (D)	Hamp Baker (D)	Bill Dawson (D)	3 (D)
1982-1987	Norma Eagleton (D)	Hamp Baker (D)	James B. Townsend (D)	3 (D)
1987-1989	Norma Eagleton (D)	Bob Hopkins (D)	James B. Townsend (D)	3 (D)
1989-1991	Bob Anthony (R)	Bob Hopkins (D)	James B. Townsend (D)	2 (D) - 1 (R)
1991-1993	Bob Anthony (R)	Cody L. Graves (D)	J. C. Watts (R)	2 (R) - 1 (D)
1993-1995	Bob Anthony (R)	Cody L. Graves (D)	J. C. Watts (R)	2 (R) - 1 (D)
1995-1997	Bob Anthony (R)	Cody L. Graves (D)	Ed Apple (R)	2 (R) - 1 (D)
1997-2003	Bob Anthony (R)	Denise Bode (R)	Ed Apple (R)	3 (R)
2003-2007	Bob Anthony (R)	Denise Bode (R)	Jeff Cloud (R)	3 (R)
2007-2009	Bob Anthony (R)	Jim Roth (D)	Jeff Cloud (R)	2 (R) - 1 (D)
2009-2011	Bob Anthony (R)	Dana Murphy (R)	Jeff Cloud (R)	3 (R)
2011-2015	Bob Anthony (R)	Dana Murphy (R)	Patrice Douglas (R)	3 (R)
2015-2023	Bob Anthony (R)	Dana Murphy (R)	Todd Hiett (R)	3 (R)
2023-2025	Bob Anthony (R)	Kim David (R)	Todd Hiett (R)	3 (R)
2025-present	Brian Bingman (R)	Kim David (R)	Todd Hiett (R)	3 (R)

== Organization ==
- Corporation Commission
  - Judicial and Legislative Services- The former Administration, Judicial, and General Counsel Divisions were merged in 2017 to increase efficiency and reduce costs.
    - Administration Office- Responsible for providing central services to the Commission's division as well as direct support staff to the Commission members
      - Public Information Office
      - Finance Office
      - Human Resources Office
      - Administrative Programs Office
      - Office of the Secretary to the Commission
    - Administrative Hearings Office - responsible for overseeing all hearings and appeals of the Commission's regulations
    - Office of the General Counsel - responsible for providing legal advice to the Commission
      - Agency Counsel Section
      - Consumer Services Section
      - Deliberations Section
      - Petroleum Storage Tank/Transportation Section
      - Oil and Gas Section
      - Public Utilities Section
  - Transportation Division - responsible for licensing and regulating commercial motor carriers, natural gas pipelines, and railroad companies, and administers the International Fuel Tax Agreement and International Registration Plan
    - Administrative and Regulatory Operations Unit
      - Administrative Support Department
      - Requirements Department
      - Enforcement Support Department
      - Safety Support Department
    - Field Operations Unit
      - Motor Carrier and Motor Vehicle Enforcement Department
      - Pipeline Safety Department
      - Railroad Department
    - IFTA/IRP Unit
      - IFTA/IRP Registration and Licensing Services Department
      - Audit Department
    - Technical Services Department
  - Oil and Gas Conservation Division - responsible for enforcing Commission rules that prevent pollution caused by oil and gas
    - Field Operations Department
      - District 1 Office - Tulsa * Former Bristow office was closed in September 2024 *
      - District 2 Office - Kingfisher
      - District 3 Office - Duncan
      - District 4 Office - Ada
    - Pollution Abatement Underground Injection Control Department
  - Consumer Services Division - responsible for hearing complaints against regulated utilities and for overseeing appeals to the Commission members
    - Oil and Gas Complaints Department
    - Public Utility Complaints Department
    - Mineral Owners Escrow Account Department
    - Administrative Proceedings Office
  - Public Utilities Division - responsible for regulating electric power utilities, natural gas utilities, drinking water utilities, and telecommunications companies.
    - Energy Group- Handles all gas, electric, water, and cotton gin matters.
    - Telecommunications Group
    - Oklahoma Universal Services Group-Administers $30 million dollar OUSF.
    - Consumer Services Group
    - Enforcement Group- Field safety throughout Oklahoma
    - Administrative Group
  - Petroleum Storage Tank Division - responsible for enforcing state and federal regulations and administers certain assistance programs applicable to the storage, quality, and delivery of refined petroleum products
    - Accounting Department
    - Administration Department
    - Compliance and Inspection Department
    - Technical Department
  - Information Technology Division

== Staffing ==
The commission, with an annual budget of over $170 million, is one of the larger employers of Oklahoma state government. For fiscal year 2025, the commission was authorized 538 full-time employees.

Division	Budget FY25 (in millions)
Administrative, Judicial, and Legal Services (AJLS)	$15,962,278.00
Petroleum Storage Tank Division	$7,368,372.00
Oil and Gas Conservation Division	$104,636,161.00 (includes Federal funding)
Public Utilities Division	$7,419,189.00
Transportation Division	$24,589,849.00
Information Technology	$10,876,811.00
Total	$170,852,660.00
