= Oklahoma State Auditor and Inspector =

Elected official

Office of the State Auditor and Inspector of Oklahoma
- Great Seal of Oklahoma

Agency overview
- Formed: November 17, 1907
- Headquarters: Oklahoma State Capitol; Oklahoma City, Oklahoma
- Employees: 169 unclassified
- Annual budget: $26.5 million
- Agency executive: Cindy Byrd, State Auditor and Inspector
- Website: Office of the State Auditor and Inspector

The Oklahoma State Auditor and Inspector is an elected Constitutional officer for the U.S. State of Oklahoma. The State Auditor and Inspector is responsible for auditing and prescribing bookkeeping standards of all government agencies and county treasurers within Oklahoma. The office in its current form is a consolidation of the office of State Auditor with that of the office of State Examiner and Inspector, both of which dated back to statehood in 1907. The two positions were combined in 1979 after passage of State Question 510 in 1975. Tom Daxon was the first person to hold the combined office and the first Republican as all previous occupants of either position were Democrats.

The 13th State Auditor and Inspector is Cindy Byrd, who began her four-year term in 2019.

== Constitutional requirements ==
Article 6, Section 3 of the Oklahoma Constitution requires all executive branch officials to be a United States citizen, at least 31 years old and have been a registered elector within Oklahoma for 10 years prior to election.

However, Article 6, Section 19 places one additional requirement upon the State Auditor and Inspector. The auditor must have at least 3 years of prior experience as an "expert accountant" before seeking office. (The term "expert accountant" is not defined but is generally understood to require that the officeholder must be a certified public accountant.)

== Election ==
State Auditor and Inspector is elected directly by the people of Oklahoma.

Elections for the State Auditor and Inspector are held on a four-year concurrent basis with the election of the Governor. After all votes are collected, the Legislature of Oklahoma shall convene in the hall of the House of Representatives and the Speaker of the House of Representatives announce the results of the elections in the presence of a majority of each branch of the Legislature. The persons having the highest number of votes for the office of the State Auditor and Inspector shall be declared duly elected. However, in case two or more shall have an equal and the highest number of votes for the office of State Auditor and Inspector, the Legislature shall, by joint ballot, choose one of the said persons having an equal and the highest number of votes for the office of State Auditor and Inspector.

== Term of office ==
The State Auditor and Inspector's four-year term begins on the second Monday in January following the general election. In 2010, passage of State Question 747 amended Article VI of the Oklahoma Constitution to establish term limits for all statewide officeholders. The terms of the governor, lieutenant governor, attorney general, state auditor and inspector, treasurer, commissioner of labor, superintendent of public instruction, and insurance commissioner are limited to a total of eight years. Members of the corporation commissioner are limited to twelve year terms.

== Powers and responsibilities ==
The primary function of the State Auditor and Inspector is to account for all of the state's funds. Twice annually, without notice, the State Auditor and Inspector examines the books, accounts, and cash on hand or in bank of the state treasurer and all country treasurers. The financial statements of the state treasurer are audited one per year. At least once every two fiscal years, the State Auditor & Inspector shall audit the books and accounts of all state agencies whose duty it is to collect, disburse, or manage funds of the state. Other annual financial audits of public entities or officials include the district attorney offices of the state, the department of corrections, the Oklahoma Employees Insurance and Benefits Board, the eight Circuit Engineering Districts, and (every two years) county government.

Performance audits may be conducted upon request of the governor, attorney general, agency director, governing board, or joint resolution of the Oklahoma Legislature. Special audits may be requested by the governor, attorney general, local district attorney, governing board, or by citizen petition upon collection of valid signatures from 10 percent of the registered voters living within the boundaries of the political subdivision subject to the audit. If a performance or special audit identifies suspected wrongdoing, the report is shared with the attorney general or district attorney for consideration of prosecuting the alleged offenders.

It is the duty of the State Auditor and Inspector to examine all taxes to raise public revenue and to make certain that they are made according to law and constitutional provisions. The State Auditor and Inspector shall have the power to order all excessive or erroneous taxes to be corrected by the proper officers. The State Auditor and Inspector must report any irregularities in taxes to the Governor, the President pro tempore of the Oklahoma Senate, and the Speaker of the Oklahoma House of Representatives.

At least once a year, the State Auditor and Inspector must make an annual report to the Governor the state and county finances he has ascertained. The report must be made on the first day in November every year.

The State Auditor and Inspector may employ additional auditors as needed including Deputy State Auditor and Inspectors. The functions, duties and terms of office of the Deputy State Auditor and Inspector is regulated at the discretion of the State Auditor and Inspector.

== Divisions ==
- Administration Division - direct staff of the State Auditor and central services of the Office
- Local Government and Special Services Division - assists government entities and subdivisions of the state and local governments in establishing and implementing strong accountability systems
- Gaming & Horse Racing Division - performs the audit function of the electronic gaming machines at licensed horse racing facilities in the state
- Information Services Division - coordinates information technology usage by the Office
- Management Services Division - offers quality management advisory and consulting services to county officers and management of public entities and prescribe accounting procedures and forms to be used by county officials
- Minerals Management Division - ensures that the royalties from producing oil and gas properties on Federal Lands in Oklahoma are correctly reported and paid to the Minerals Management Service, with 50% of all federal royalties going to the State
- State Agency Division - provides accountability of state government through financial audits, compliance audits, attestation engagements, and other special audits
- Performance Audit division – conducts audits of agency programs or projects to ensure effective and efficient delivery of government services and compliance with statutory or federal guidance in the expenditure of public funds.
- Forensic Audit Division – conducts special or investigative audits upon proper request when fraud, embezzlements, misuse, misappropriation, or waste of public funds is alleged to have occurred.
- Training/CPE Division - coordinates training courses for the staff and offers such training to other state employees in line with yellow book standards for continuing education credits

== Oath of Office ==
"I, ........., do solemnly swear (or affirm) that I will support, obey, and defend the Constitution of the United States, and the Constitution of the State of Oklahoma, and that I will not, knowingly, receive, directly or indirectly, any money or other valuable thing, for the performance or nonperformance of any act or duty pertaining to my office, other than the compensation allowed by law; I further swear (or affirm) that I will faithfully discharge my duties as State Auditor and Inspector of the State of Oklahoma to the best of my ability."

== Office-holders ==
=== State Auditor ===
#	Name	Party	Term
1	Martin E. Trapp	Democratic	1907–1911
2	Leo Meyer	Democratic	1911–1913
3	Joseph C. McClelland	Democratic	1913–1915
4	Everette B. Howard	Democratic	1915–1919
5	Frank Carter	Democratic	1919–1923
6	C. C. Childers	Democratic	1923–1927
7	A. S. J. Shaw	Democratic	1927–1931
8	Frank Carter	Democratic	1931–1935
9	C. C. Childers	Democratic	1935–1939
10	Frank Carter	Democratic	1939–1943
11	C. C. Childers	Democratic	1943–1947
12	A. S. J. Shaw	Democratic	1947-1951
13	Wilburn Cartwright	Democratic	1951–1954
14	Gladys Warren	Democratic	July 10, 1954-1955
15	A. S. J. Shaw	Democratic	1955-1959
16	Andy Anderson	Democratic	1959-1962
17	Imogene Holmes	Democratic	1962-1963
18	A. F. Shaw	Democratic	1963-1967
19	Joe Bailey Cobb	Democratic	1967-1977
20	Ray Parr	Democratic	1977

=== State Examiner and Inspector ===
#	Name	Party	Term
1	Charles Taylor	Democratic	1907–1915
2	Fred Parkinson	Democratic	1915–1923
3	George J. Mechling	Democratic	1924–1927
4	John Rogers	Democratic	1927–1946
5	Charles G. Morris	Democratic	1946–1954
6	Scott Burson	Democratic	1954–1959
7	John M. Rogers	Democratic	1959–1979

=== State Auditor and Inspector ===
#	Name	Party	Term
1	Tom Daxon	Republican	1979–1983
2	Clifton Scott	Democratic	1983–2003
3	Jeff McMahan	Democratic	2003–2008
4	Steve Burrage	Democratic	2008–2011
5	Gary Jones	Republican	2011–2019
6	Cindy Byrd	Republican	2019–present
