= Leo Meyer (politician) =

American politician

2nd Oklahoma State Auditor
- In office 1911 – February 1913
- Governor: Lee Cruce
- Preceded by: Martin E. Trapp
- Succeeded by: Joseph C. McClelland

Assistant Secretary of State
- In office 1907–1911
- Governor: Charles N. Haskell

Mayor of Sayre, Oklahoma
- In office 1905–1906

Mayor of Bellville, Texas
- In office 1890s

Personal details
- Born: October 2, 1873 New York City, New York
- Died: February 14, 1964 (aged 90) Tulsa, Oklahoma
- Party: Democratic
- Education: attended high school in Brooklyn, New York

Leo Meyer (October 2, 1873 – February 14, 1964) was a politician in Texas and Oklahoma and was the first Jew elected to statewide public office in Oklahoma.

== Early years ==
Meyer was born in New York City on October 2, 1873, to recent German immigrant parents. After attending high school in Brooklyn, New York, he moved to Texas at age 16, where he entered the mercantile and cotton business in Bellville, Texas, in 1890. In 1895 he married Margaret Lewis of Nelsonville, Texas, and was becoming active in local politics in Bellville, eventually being elected as mayor in 1895.

The 1900 Galveston hurricane destroyed his family's business, so Meyer and his family moved to Sayre, Oklahoma, where he worked as the manager of the Dixie Dry Goods store. He also continued his work in Democratic party politics. In 1903, he was elected to the town's first board of trustees as treasurer before serving as the town's first mayor from 1905, to 1906.

== Assistant to William Cross ==
In 1906, Meyer attended the Oklahoma constitutional convention (contrary to some reports, he was not a delegate) and was a strong supporter of the draft constitution's progressive and populist agenda, which may have influenced William Macklin Cross (the first Oklahoma Secretary of State) to choose Meyer as Oklahoma's first Assistant Secretary of State. In 1907, the Meyer family moved to Guthrie, Oklahoma (the then state capitol), where his family was one of ten families who came together to form Guthrie's first Jewish congregation.

=== Guthrie antisemitism incident ===
The most notable event in Meyer's time in the Oklahoma State department was his role in the transfer of the Oklahoma state capitol from Guthrie to Oklahoma City in 1910. The incident led the Guthrie Daily Leader newspaper to use extreme anti-semitic language to accuse the Jewish community in Oklahoma City of having inappropriately "stolen" the state capitol from Guthrie. Significant media attention included the forceful assertion by Rabbi Joseph Blatt of Oklahoma City that the newspaper's claims were slanderous and that they were a "a disgrace to the civilization of our state".

== State Auditor ==
In 1910, Meyers initially ran for Oklahoma Secretary of State, but lost the Democratic primary to Benjamin F. Harrison. However, the Oklahoma State Auditor died hours after winning renomination for the office. Meyer was voted to replace him on the November ballot and he was elected as Oklahoma's second state auditor. Meyer aligned himself with the administration of Governor Lee Cruce, which drew the ire of his critics in the Oklahoma Legislature. When Meyers was accused of perjury, Republican Walter Ferguson defended him, arguing the "jealousy and factionalism" led to the investigation.

On February 8, 1913, perjury charges were dismissed by County Judge John Hayson, and the Oklahoma House of Representatives filed for impeachment the same day. He resigned on February 12, 1913, rather than face an impeachment hearing.

== Later life and death ==
The Meyer family moved from Oklahoma City to Tulsa in 1916 where Meyer became the tax counsel of the Mid-continent Petroleum Company. In Tulsa, Meyer was deeply involved in the community of Temple Israel (Tulsa, Oklahoma) (a Reform Jewish synagogue), including being elected as Temple President in 1924. Meyer died in Tulsa on February 14, 1964.

== Electoral history ==
Oklahoma Secretary of State Democratic primary (August 2, 1910)
Party	Candidate	Votes	%
Democratic	Ben F. Harrison	56,005	55.0%
Democratic	Leo Meyer	45,874	45.0%
Turnout		101,879	

1910 Oklahoma State Auditor election
Party	Candidate	Votes	%	±%
Democratic	Leo Meyer	117,954	50.1%	−4.4%
Republican	Thomas S. Dulaney	93,749	39.8%	−1.3%
Socialist	H.A. Kembel	23,706	10.0%	+5.7%
Democratic hold		Swing		

Party political offices
Preceded by Martin E. Trapp	Democratic nominee for Auditor of Oklahoma; 1910	Succeeded by Everette B. Howard
