= Micky Donnelly =

Artist from Northern Ireland

- Born: 1952; Andersonstown, Belfast, Northern Ireland
- Died: 13 September 2019 (aged 66–67); Sligo, Ireland
- Education: Ulster University
- Notable work: Belfast Series; Reflex Series; Proposition Series
- Spouse: Noreen O'Hare (until 2002, her death)
- Elected: Aosdána (1996)
- Website: mickydonnelly.com

Michael Donnelly (1952 – 13 September 2019) was a Northern Irish painter, sculptor and installation artist.

== Early life ==
Donnelly was born in Belfast in 1952. He attended St Mary's Christian Brothers' Grammar School, Belfast and initially studied maths, computer science and astronomy at Queen's University Belfast; he dropped out and became active in the People's Democracy movement, working as a social worker in the Divis Flats. He later studied for a BA and MA in fine art at University of Ulster, Belfast in 1976–81.

== Career ==
In 1985 he won the Arts Council of Northern Ireland Scholarship at the British School at Rome.

He was elected to the elite artistic institution Aosdána in 1996.

According to The Irish News, "Donnelly had been questioning political, religious and societal norms from an early age and his critiques as an artist often employed familiar cultural images, such as Easter lilies, James Connolly's hat or Edward Carson's statue, but transposed onto abstracted backgrounds."

== Personal life and death ==
Donnelly was married to the sculptor and curator Noreen O'Hare (1957–2002); she was the first director of the Ormeau Baths Gallery. Donnelly died in 2019 of an intracerebral hemorrhage; he donated his lung and kidneys.
