= Jack C. Walton =

American politician

Jack Walton
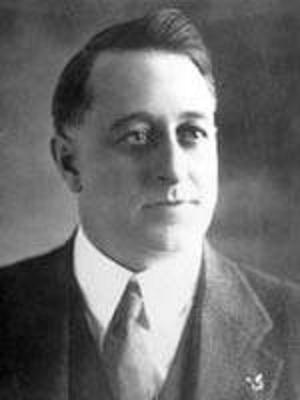

Oklahoma Corporation Commissioner
- In office January 9, 1933 – January 9, 1939
- Preceded by: C. C. Childers
- Succeeded by: Ray O. Weems

5th Governor of Oklahoma
- In office January 9, 1923 – November 19, 1923
- Lieutenant: Martin E. Trapp
- Preceded by: James Robertson
- Succeeded by: Martin E. Trapp

19th Mayor of Oklahoma City
- In office April 7, 1919 – January 9, 1923
- Preceded by: Byron D. Shear
- Succeeded by: Mike Donnelly (acting)

Personal details
- Born: John Calloway Walton; March 6, 1881 Indianapolis, Indiana, U.S.
- Died: November 25, 1949 (aged 68) Oklahoma City, Oklahoma, U.S.
- Party: Democratic
- Spouse: Madeleine Orrick Walton (m. 1905–1947)

John Calloway Walton (March 6, 1881 – November 25, 1949) was an American politician and the 5th governor of Oklahoma, serving the shortest tenure. He was impeached and removed from office shortly into his first term. A populist member of the Democratic Party, Walton previously served as the 18th Mayor of Oklahoma City between 1919 and 1923.

Following his removal from office, he entered the primary for a seat in the United States Senate, winning the Democratic nomination, but losing to William B. Pine, a Republican. He was elected to the Oklahoma Corporation Commission in 1932 and served until 1939, running for governor again in 1934 and 1938. He died in 1949 and is buried in Rose Hill Cemetery in Oklahoma City.

== Early life ==
John Calloway Walton was born on March 6, 1881, near Indianapolis, Indiana. His family later moved to Lincoln, Nebraska and then again to Fort Smith, Arkansas. He attended Fort Smith Commercial College before finding work as a railroad timekeeper.

At the age of sixteen, Walton joined the United States Army in 1897, and served for six years. Walton did not see combat service during the Spanish–American War; however he did serve at a post in Mexico for some time. He claimed to have worked as the presidential train engineer for Porfirio Diaz while in Mexico, but this is likely untrue. However, he did study engineering in Mexico City before returning to Kansas City to work as a salesman.

Following his discharge from the Army in 1903, Walton traveled to Oklahoma Territory to make his life as a contractor in the field of civil engineering. Walton set up his practice in Oklahoma City. Around 1913 he cofounded the McIntosh and Walton Engineering Company. Some of Walton's critics allege he did not arrive in Oklahoma City until 1915.

== Oklahoma City politics ==
Walton joined the Democratic Party and by 1917 had earned a reputation as a charismatic politician.

=== Mayor of Oklahoma City ===
In 1917 Walton was elected Oklahoma City's Commissioner of Public Works. Two years later Walton, known for very active campaigning and bringing a jazz band to his events, was elected as the Mayor of Oklahoma City in 1919. However Walton was not popular amongst Oklahoma City journalists who viewed him as a political upstart.

As Mayor, he launched a "Purity Squad" campaign against crime in the city and struggled with the city commission over control of the Oklahoma City Police Department throughout his term.

While Mayor, Walton had his first run-in with the rising Ku Klux Klan. On July 19, 1921, Walton declared that he had information that fifty per cent of the members of the Oklahoma City police department belonged to the Ku Klux Klan. Walton directed Chief Glitsch to investigate and to discharge every police officer who did not resign immediately from the Klan. On July 24, Mayor Walton was called on the telephone, and was told: “We warn you to lay off the Ku Klux Klan, or we will have to wait on you.” The mayor paid no attention to the warning, and the investigation went ahead.

In January 1922, Walton supported striking meat packers in the city by refusing to provide Oklahoma City Police Department protection to businesses with striking workers and providing food for striking workers. After the Lynching of Jake Brooks he denounced attempts to declare martial law in the city by James B. A. Robertson. His efforts earned him the support of the Socialist Party of Oklahoma, the Farmer-Labor Reconstruction League, and other farmer and labor organizations.

== Governor of Oklahoma ==
=== 1922 Gubernatorial campaign and inauguration ===
In 1922 the Farmer-Labor Reconstruction League's George Wilson and the Socialist Party of Oklahoma faction led by Patrick S. Nagle organized the 1922 Shawnee Convention during the Oklahoma State Federation of Labor's annual conference to create an 18-point platform, similar to North Dakota's Non-Partisan League's platform. After the conference began courting his endorsement, Walton agreed to run for governor on their platform.

Walton entered the 1922 Democratic primary as a candidate for Governor of Oklahoma to succeed James B. A. Robertson. Walton defeated the Ku Klux Klan backed R. H. Wilson and the conservative Democrat Thomas H. Owen. He continued his habit of campaigning with dramatic speeches and a jazz band during his general election for governor and went on to win the general election against the Republican candidate John Fields, despite an advertising campaign by conservative Democrats accusing him of "Sovietism" and "state Socialism".

Walton was inaugurated as the fifth Governor of Oklahoma on January 9, 1923. Walton's inauguration was hosted as a two-day party in Oklahoma City with square dancing and barbecue. The party included "antelope, bear, buffalo, five thousand chickens, deer, ducks, frogs, geese, two hundred hogs, two hundred possums, three thousand rabbits, one thousand squirrels, five hundred beef 'critters,' sweet potatoes, two hundred and fifty bushels of onions, one hundred thousand loaves of bread, and one hundred thousand buns" and "20,000 gallons of coffee." Attendance estimates range from 60,000 to 150,000 people.

=== Tenure ===
Once in office Walton appointed the Socialist organizer Patrick S. Nagle to a key advisership role. Walton pushed through agricultural reform: establishing agriculture warehouses, advanced farmer's cooperatives, and farmer's community market associations. Other agricultural reform included a revision of the Workman's Compensation Law for improved benefits to employees and stronger warehouse inspection laws to satisfy Oklahoma's cotton and wheat farmers.

He also vehemently opposed the death penalty, vowing no executions would happen during his term. He also liberally used pardons and encouraged the liberal use of parole, all of which proved unpopular with the Oklahoma Legislature. He also passed through the Legislature Oklahoma's first program to allow free text books to all students in Oklahoma's schools, passed through a grant of over $1,000,000 in state funds to aid weak schools, instituted harsher penalties for breaking state laws and regulations, increased spending on welfare programs, and instituted a farm stabilization program under the supervision of the State Board of Agriculture.

Walton heavily appointed his political allies to state jobs. On one occasion, he removed five members of the Oklahoma University Board of Regents, replacing them with political allies. Another such ally, George Wilson, Walton's pick for president of Oklahoma A&M College, lacked a college degree and was installed with an escort from the Oklahoma National Guard after protests in Stillwater.

Walton later lost the support of his populist and progressive allies when he purchased a personal mansion in Oklahoma City and a second home in Muskogee with financial backing from oilman, and future governor, E. W. Marland. He replaced his former allies in state jobs with more conservative Democrats as he began to campaign for the 1924 United States Senate election in Oklahoma. He also requested a raise from $5,000 to $200,000 a year, which alienated his former allies and the legislature.

The Ku Klux Klan had between 75,000 and 105,000 members in Oklahoma in 1923, including many prominent Oklahomans. Walton himself had both criticized the Klan and been reported as a member. On June 26, 1923, Walton declared martial law in Okmulgee County in order to crack down on reports of mob violence from the Ku Klux Klan. He deployed 400 Oklahoma National Guard troops to the county for three days, with a small contingent occupying Henryetta until July 10. On August 10, four men beat Nata Hantaman in Tulsa after he was questioned by police. The assault led Walton to institute martial law again, this time in Tulsa County, on August 14 after no arrests were made. General Baird H. Markham led 150 Oklahoma National Guard troops into Tulsa and began investigating mob violence in the city. Four Klansmen were later arrested and sentenced for rioting. The Oklahoma press attacked Walton's expansion of power, with one of his own secretaries saying he had "the power of George III" in Tulsa.

On September 6 Walton named the Klan, for the first time, as the target of his use of martial law. Oklahoma Klan Grand Dragon N. C. Jewett defiantly told the governor the Klan in the state would not be broken. On the 11, he banned all Klan demonstrations for the duration of his administration.

=== Impeachment and removal ===
Walton's main opponents in Oklahoma politics were "disappointed office-seekers, the Klan, and the school bloc" according to a 1930 study.

The Oklahoma Constitution strictly forbade any member of the state government from suspending habeas corpus and the legislature was outraged by Governor Walton's move to do so in Tulsa County. In response, a grand jury was ordered to convene in Oklahoma City S based on a petition by Campbell Russell on the September 17 order of Judge George W. Clark.

On September 20, William Dalton McBee organized a meeting of 64 other Oklahoma legislators at Skirvin Hotel, where they issued a proclamation modeled on the United States Declaration of Independence, announcing their intention to convene a special session of the Oklahoma Legislature despite lacking constitutional authority to call their own special session on the 26th.

Following the announcement of the creation of the grand jury, on September 23, 1923, Walton declared "absolute martial law" for the entire state to prevent a "klan conspiracy." He threatened to have the Oklahoma National Guard shoot any legislators attempting to meet at the capitol on the 26th. That day, 68 members of the legislator showed up for the special session and were dispersed by national guardsmen from the capitol, forcing them to return to the Skirvin Hotel. Back at the hotel, 54 men "from Chicago" were at the hotel to intimidate state legislators.

On September 28, Oklahoma Secretary of State Richard A. Sneed ruled a petition amendment to allow the legislature to meet would be scheduled for October 2. The Oklahoma Supreme Court approved the election the next day. On October 1, Walton declared an indefinite postponement of the referendum and threatened to use troops to prevent the election, however most counties held their elections anyway with only minor incidents. The amendment passed and McBee gathered enough legislator signatures to call a special session on October 17. Walton offered to resign in exchange for the legislature passing anti-Klan legislation and called an October 11 special session.

Under the supervision of the Speaker of the House William Dalton McBee, the House brought twenty-two charges (with six later dismissed) against Walton on October 16. Representative Wesley E. Disney, acted as the prosecutor in the Senate, which oversaw his impeachment trial in its function as the Court of Impeachment. His impeachment trial was presided over by the chief justice of the Oklahoma Supreme Court. Of the House's twenty-two charges, eleven were sustained, including "illegal collection of campaign funds, padding the public payroll, suspension of habeas corpus, excessive use of the pardon power, and general incompetence." On November 19, 1923, Walton was convicted and removed from office. Lieutenant Governor Trapp succeeded Walton and became the sixth Governor of Oklahoma on the same day.

The impeachment is said to have "frightened" the state "into a system of preferential voting as an escape from minority nominations." Walton received 44% of the total votes cast in the Democratic primary, yet not a majority. This perceived injustice induced the legislature to adopt a different electoral system. Eventually, they created the primary electoral system in the state.

== Later political activity and death ==
In 1924, the year after Walton's removal from office, U.S. Senator Robert L. Owen retired; he had represented Oklahoma in the Senate since it became a state in 1907. Walton promptly entered the primary for Senator and won the Democratic nomination with just 30% of the vote, narrowly defeating Rep. E. B. Howard. Walton may have won the nomination so soon after his removal from office because he was the only Democratic candidate to criticize the Klan publicly. However, Walton lost in the general election in a landslide (62% to 35%) to Republican William B. Pine. Leading Democrats in the state responded by enacting a ranked-choice voting scheme that required voters to support second and third choices in order for their ballots to count, a provision that resulted in the primary electoral system being ruled unconstitutional by the Oklahoma Supreme Court. After that legislation was passed to implement the run-off system that is in place in the state today.

In 1931, Walton ran for another term as Mayor of Oklahoma City, but lost the election. In 1932 he was elected to the Oklahoma Corporation Commission, serving from 1933 to 1939. In 1934, and again in 1938, he ran for Governor, losing both times in Democratic primary. He died on November 25, 1949, and is buried in Rose Hill Cemetery in Oklahoma City.

== Electoral history ==
1922 Oklahoma gubernatorial Democratic primary results
Party	Candidate	Votes	%
Democratic	Jack Walton	119,248	44.2
Democratic	R. H. Wilson	84,320	31.2
Democratic	Thomas H. Owen	63,915	23.7
Democratic	Arthur Finn	1,206	0.4
Democratic	Frank Ziska	849	0.3
Total votes		269,538	100.00

1922 Oklahoma gubernatorial election
Party	Candidate	Votes	%	±%
Democratic	Jack Walton	280,206	54.4	+0.9%
Republican	John Fields	230,469	44.7	+2.1%
Socialist	O. E. Enfield	3,941	0.7	−3.1%
Democratic hold		Swing	+0.9%	

1924 United States Senate election in Oklahoma Democratic primary
Party	Candidate	Votes	%
Democratic	Jack C. Walton	91,510	30.67%
Democratic	Everette B. Howard	83,922	28.13%
Democratic	Thomas Gore	56,249	18.85%
Democratic	C. J. Wrightsman	51,291	17.19%
Democratic	Sargent Prentiss Freeling	15,384	5.16%
Total votes		298,356	100.00%

1924 United States Senate election in Oklahoma
Party	Candidate	Votes	%	±%
Republican	William B. Pine	339,646	61.46%	+20.77%
Democratic	Jack C. Walton	196,417	35.54%	−19.92%
Farmer–Labor	George Wilson	15,025	2.72%	—
Independent	Jack Benson	541	0.10%	—
Independent	E. N. Bryant	516	0.09%	—
Independent	Alonzo Turner	239	0.04%	—
Independent	Thomas P. Hopley	237	0.04%	—
Majority		143,229	25.92%	+11.15%
Turnout		552,621		
Republican gain from Democratic				

1932 Oklahoma Corporation Commission Democratic primary
Party	Candidate	Votes	%
Democratic	Jack C. Walton	76,485	22.2%
Democratic	A. S. J. Shaw	65,880	19.1%
Democratic	C. C. Childers (incumbent)	63,154	18.3%
Democratic	I. L. Cook	37,422	10.8%
Democratic	W. C. McAlister	27,845	8.1%
Democratic	George S. Long	26,181	7.6%
Democratic	Fred Davis	8,038	2.3%
Democratic	Theodore S. Wilcox	6,081	1.7%
Democratic	William C. Evans	6,029	1.7%
Democratic	G. A. Jordan	5,866	1.7%
Democratic	Earl Allen	5,696	1.6%
Democratic	Chas. West	5,686	1.6%
Democratic	W. A. Richardson	4,538	1.3%
Democratic	Robert Housaman	2,757	0.8%
Democratic	Thurman A. Tunstall	2,071	0.6%
Total votes		343,729	100.00%

1932 Oklahoma Corporation Commission Democratic primary runoff
Party	Candidate	Votes	%
Democratic	Jack C. Walton	221,509	50.9%
Democratic	A. S. J. Shaw	212,847	49.1%
Total votes		434,356	100.00%

1932 Oklahoma Corporation Commissioner election
Party	Candidate	Votes	%
Democratic	Jack Walton	377,923	56.5%
Republican	J. H. Johnston	290,716	43.5%
Total votes		668,716	100.00%

1934 Oklahoma gubernatorial Democratic primary results
Party	Candidate	Votes	%
Democratic	E. W. Marland	156,885	30.5
Democratic	Tom Anglin	101,698	19.8
Democratic	Jack Walton	85,616	16.6
Democratic	J. Berry King	69,811	13.5
Democratic	Gomer Smith	44,992	8.7
Democratic	Robert Burns	33,521	6.5
Democratic	Porter Newman	8,763	1.7
Democratic	John A. McDonald	5,025	0.9
Democratic	R. M. Nelson	1,602	0.3
Democratic	Cyrus S. Avery	1,572	0.3
Democratic	Edwin I. Reeser	1,071	0.2
Democratic	J. Oliver Tilly	870	0.1
Democratic	John Freeman	793	0.1
Democratic	Grover Cleveland Brown	531	0.1
Total votes		513,486	100.00

1938 Oklahoma gubernatorial Democratic primary results
Party	Candidate	Votes	%
Democratic	Leon C. Phillips	179,139	30.1
Democratic	William S. Key	176,034	29.6
Democratic	William H. Murray	148,395	24.9
Democratic	Jack Walton	45,760	7.7
Democratic	Ira M. Finley	37,107	6.2
Democratic	William M. Edwards	2,557	0.4
Democratic	John W. Davis	2,205	0.3
Democratic	J. M. Cole	1,410	0.2
Democratic	T. W. Bickel	1,088	0.1
Total votes		593,695	100.00

== Works ==
- First State of the State Speech

== Works cited ==
- Duren, Brad L. (Winter 2002). ""Klanspiracy" or Despotism? The Rise and Fall of Governor Jack Walton, featuring W. D. McBee" (PDF). Chronicles of Oklahoma. 80 (4): 468–485.

Political offices
Preceded by Byron D. Shear	Mayor of Oklahoma City; 1919–1923	Succeeded by Mike Donnelly; Acting
Preceded by James Robertson	Governor of Oklahoma; 1923	Succeeded by Martin E. Trapp
Party political offices
Preceded by James Robertson	Democratic nominee for Governor of Oklahoma; 1922	Succeeded by Henry S. Johnston
Preceded by Robert Latham Owen	Democratic nominee for U.S. Senator from Oklahoma (Class 2); 1924	Succeeded by Thomas Gore
