= Martin E. Trapp =

American politician

Martin Edwin Trapp
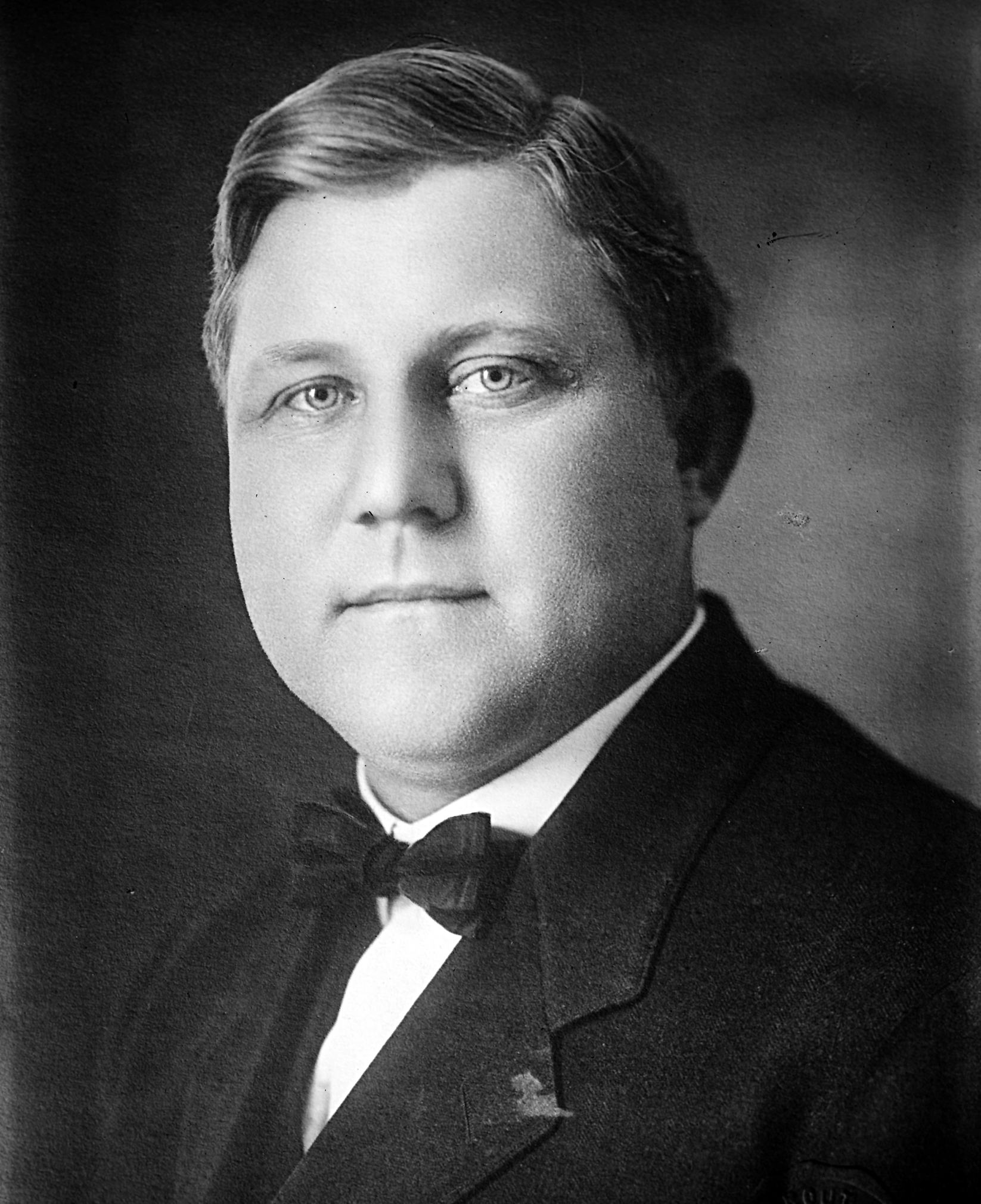

6th Governor of Oklahoma
- In office November 19, 1923 – January 10, 1927
- Lieutenant: Vacant
- Preceded by: John C. Walton
- Succeeded by: Henry S. Johnston

3rd Lieutenant Governor of Oklahoma
- In office January 11, 1915 – November 19, 1923
- Governor: John C. Walton
- Preceded by: J. J. McAlester
- Succeeded by: William J. Holloway

1st Oklahoma State Auditor
- In office November 16, 1907 – January 9, 1911
- Preceded by: Office established
- Succeeded by: Leo Meyer

Personal details
- Born: April 18, 1877 Robinson, Kansas, US
- Died: July 26, 1951 (aged 74) Oklahoma City, Oklahoma, US
- Party: Democratic
- Spouse: Lula Celia Strang (m. 1907)
- Profession: Teacher, politician

Martin Edwin Trapp (April 18, 1877 – July 26, 1951) was an American state auditor, governor and lieutenant governor of the U.S. state of Oklahoma. Oklahoma's third lieutenant governor, he was the first to become governor not through an election but instead due to the previous governor's impeachment and removal from office.

Trapp served as the first state auditor and third lieutenant governor of Oklahoma. When Governor Jack Walton was impeached and removed from office, Trapp became the sixth governor of Oklahoma. As governor, he was responsible for the establishment of a state bureau of investigation, conservation programs, and his attempts to abolish the Ku Klux Klan. He began his political career serving as the county clerk of Logan County in Oklahoma Territory.

Trapp died in 1951 and is buried in Fairlawn Cemetery in Oklahoma City.

== Early life ==
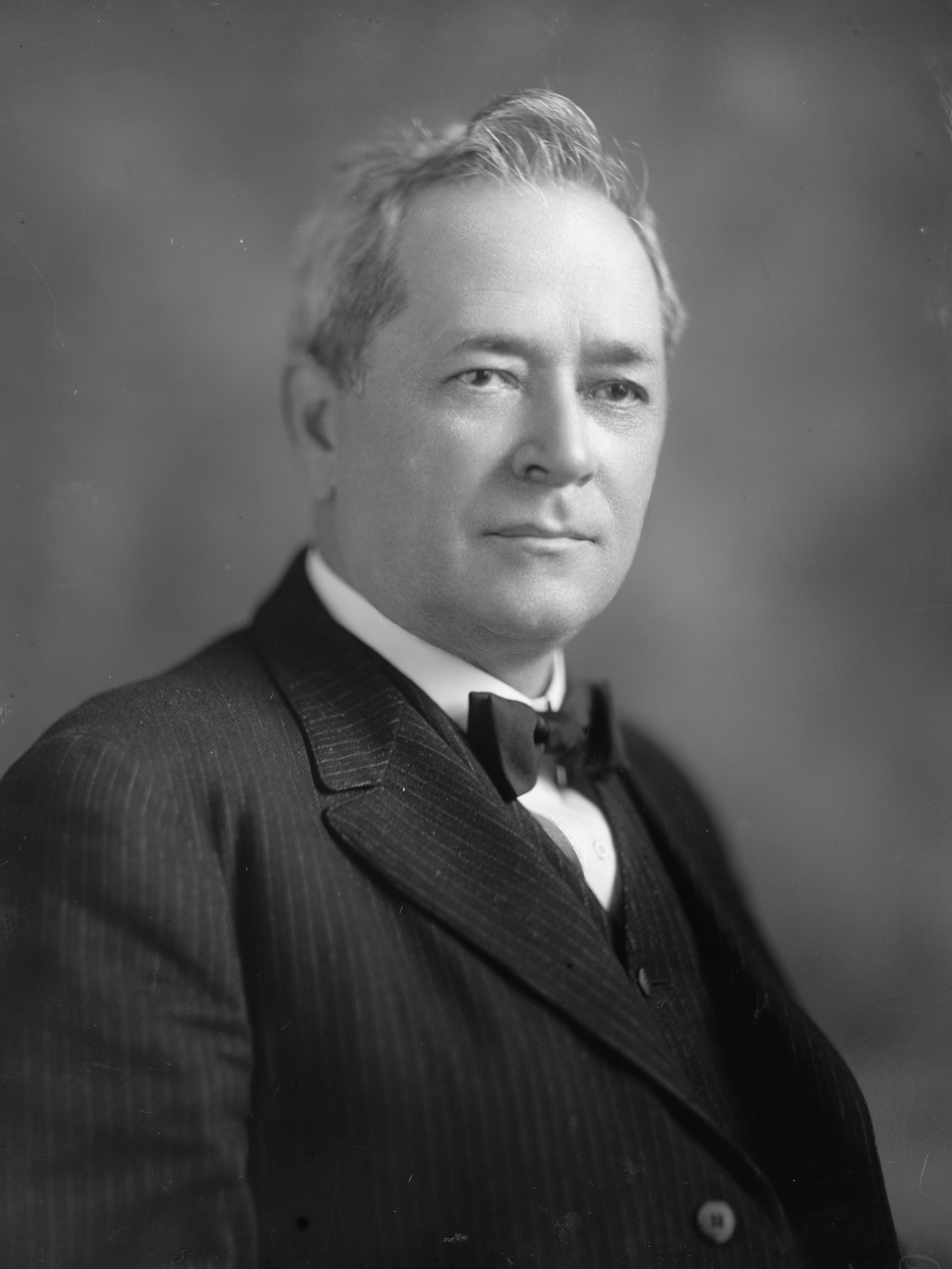
Trapp served as state auditor under Governor Charles N. Haskell.

Martin Edwin Trapp was born in Robinson, Kansas, on April 18, 1877. Martin would spend the first twelve years of his life in Kansas until 1889. Following the Land Run of 1889, Trapp's father moved his entire family to Logan County to a claim just seven miles west of Guthrie. Trapp would not attend public school as Oklahoma Territory possessed none. Instead, he was educated almost entirely by association and study with a neighbor by the last name of McDaniel. Trapp worked at a local newspaper while gaining his education. He also worked at the age of 21 as a certified teacher and later as a traveling salesman.

Trapp began his political career in 1904 when he ran on the Democratic ticket for the Logan County county clerk, an office he would hold from 1905 to 1907. On November 16, 1907, Oklahoma Territory officially became the U.S. state of Oklahoma. Trapp left county government behind him and would run for, and be elected, Oklahoma's first state auditor. Trapp served under Charles N. Haskell, the first Governor of Oklahoma, from 1907 to 1911. After his term as state auditor, Trapp moved to Muskogee, Oklahoma, where he would set up a bond business.

Trapp made a return to Oklahoma politics in 1914 when the Democrats nominated him to serve as the Lieutenant Governor of Oklahoma. Replacing outgoing Lieutenant Governor John A Greer, Trapp would be elected to his new office for three consecutive terms, in 1914, 1918, and for an unprecedented third term in 1922, winning all three elections with considerable margin, 60.8% in 1922 being his best result. Though, he experienced sort of luck in his first election, when with 104,285 votes (42.9%) he won a risky vote over Republican candidate Eugene Lawson (80,419; 33.1%) and Socialist candidate George Hamilton (53,072; 21.9%). As the lieutenant governor, Trapp would serve under governors Robert L. Williams, James B. A. Robertson, and John C. Walton. Trapp would only serve for the first 11 months of his third term. On October 23, following impeachment charges against Walton, Trapp became the acting governor. Walton was found guilty by the Oklahoma Senate in its role as the Court of Impeachment on November 19, 1923. Following the Oklahoma Constitution, Trapp immediately left the office of lieutenant governor to be inaugurated as the sixth governor of Oklahoma.

== Governor of Oklahoma ==
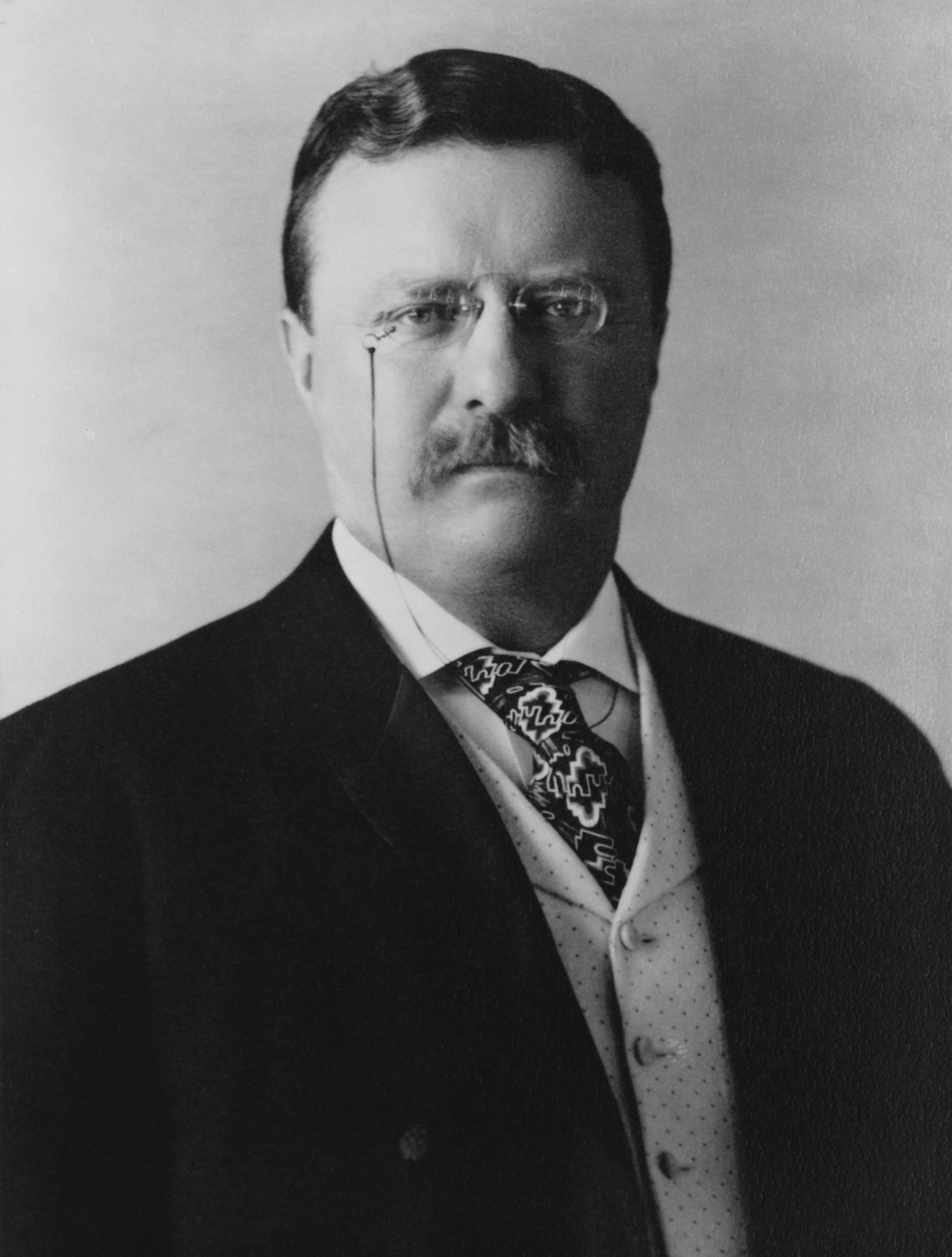
Like Theodore Roosevelt, Trapp was a pioneer of conservation programs.

Becoming the first lieutenant governor to assume the office of governor in the state's history, Trapp was Walton's opposite. Whereas Walton had been progressive and aggressive, Trapp was quiet and conservative. Top on the new governor's to-do list was trimming the state's budget to provide for a more efficient state government. Immediately upon coming into office, Trapp called the Oklahoma Legislature into special session to address the issue. An investigation of many state offices, commissions, and departments soon followed. In true conservative form, Trapp removed many state organizations that were, in his opinion, of little use to Oklahoma and provided much needed reorganization of the inflated state government.

Trapp succeeded in having the state legislature repeal over $10,000,000 in expenditures that Walton had set up, thus restoring the state's credit. This also meant repealing the state's new free textbook program and a one-third reduction in the funds spent on school aid. Through the use of a three cent gasoline tax, Trapp raised enough funds to finance Oklahoma's first Highway Commission. This commission oversaw Oklahoma's much needed highway construction program.

Following a growth national trend started by U.S. President Theodore Roosevelt in 1907, Trapp began a program of conservation. Trapp created the Oklahoma Forestry Commission, the Oklahoma Conservation Commission, and the Oklahoma Fish and Game Commission out of his desire to preserve the environment. Trapp expanded the term lengths of county offices from two years to four, enacted a state drainage law to protect the state from floods, and raised the cost of licenses in the state.

Trapp also proved to be an effective law enforcement officer. For the first time in the state's history, a State Bureau of Criminal Investigation was established in 1925 from pressure from Trapp's administration. Trapp asked the Legislature for harsher punishment and stricter enforcement of prohibition, which he received. Trapp also tackled the growing power of the Ku Klux Klan by passing an anti-mask law which eventually reduced the group's power.

== Ineligibility for reelection ==
Throughout his term, Trapp had viewed his position as "acting governor", and not the actual governor. Throughout his term, Trapp had proved a capable administrator and had become widely popular, with many agreeing that Trapp should seek retention in office. This proved to be a problem for Trapp when he desired to seek reelection in the fall of 1926. State law had forbidden the governor from succeeding himself, and thus Trapp was ineligible for reelection. Trapp insisted that the law did not apply to him since he had been elected lieutenant governor and succeeded to the governorship only upon the impeachment and removal from office of John C. Walton.

The Oklahoma Supreme Court investigated the issue. On June 6, 1926, the court ruled on the case Fitzpatrick v. McAlister, which stated that Trapp was "the governor for the simple reason that he governs. He governs officially for the reason that section 16 expressly vests him with authority to do so. Therefore he is the official governor, and, being the official governor, he is rendered ineligible to succeed himself by the inhibition contained in section 4, art. 6, of the Constitution." Thus, Trapp was ineligible to run for reelection.

Trapp officially ended his term in office on January 10, 1927, with the inauguration of Henry S. Johnston as the seventh governor of Oklahoma.

== Death and legacy ==
After finishing his term as governor, Trapp would continue to play a key role in the Oklahoma Democratic Party even though he would never hold another political office. Trapp did campaign for the governor's office again in 1930, but did not receive the party's nomination, losing it to the colorful and popular William H. Murray. Moving back to Oklahoma City, Trapp would spend the rest of his life as a dealer of investment securities. Trapp died on July 26, 1951, in Oklahoma City at the age of 74. He is buried in Fairlawn Cemetery in Oklahoma City.

As governor, Trapp left a legacy that included the establishment of the State Bureau of Criminal Investigation, environmental conservation, and victories against the Ku Klux Klan in Oklahoma. He is best remembered as the first lieutenant governor to become governor due to the impeachment and removal of a governor.

== Electoral history ==
1907 Oklahoma State Auditor election
| Party | Candidate | Votes | % | ±% |
|---|---|---|---|---|
| Democratic | Martin E. Trapp | 132,590 | 54.5 | New |
| Republican | J.E. Dyche | 99,904 | 41.1 | New |
| Socialist | A.B. Davis | 10,454 | 4.3 | New |
| Democratic gain from | | Swing | N/A | |

Oklahoma State Treasurer Democratic primary (August 2, 1910)
| Party | Candidate | Votes | % |
|---|---|---|---|
| Democratic | Robert Dunlop | 56,348 | 55.0% |
| Democratic | Martin E. Trapp | 46,233 | 45.0% |
| Turnout | | 102,581 | |

== State of the State Speeches ==
- First State of the State Speech
- Second State of the State Speech
- Third State of the State Speech

Party political offices
| First | Democratic nominee for Auditor of Oklahoma; 1907 | Succeeded by Leo Meyer |
| Preceded by J. J. McAlester | Democratic nominee for Lieutenant Governor of Oklahoma; 1914, 1918, 1922 | Succeeded by William J. Holloway |
Political offices
| Preceded by None | Oklshoma State Auditor; 1907–1911 | Succeeded by Fred Parkinson |
| Preceded by J. J. McAlester | Lieutenant Governor of Oklahoma; 1915–1923 | Succeeded by William J. Holloway |
| Preceded by John C. Walton | Governor of Oklahoma; 1923–1927 | Succeeded by Henry S. Johnston |
