= Government of Oklahoma =

Government of the U.S. state of Oklahoma

- Logo of the Oklahoman government Great Seal of the State of Oklahoma
- Polity type: Sub-national administrative division (federated state)
- Part of: United States of America
- Constitution: Constitution of Oklahoma

The government of the U.S. state of Oklahoma, established by the Oklahoma Constitution, is a republican democracy modeled after the federal government of the United States. The state government has three branches: the executive, legislative, and judicial. Through a system of separation of powers or "checks and balances," each of these branches has some authority to act on its own, some authority to regulate the other two branches, and has some of its own authority, in turn, regulated by the other branches.

The state government is based in Oklahoma City and the head of the executive branch is the Governor of Oklahoma. The legislative branch is called the Legislature and consists of the Oklahoma Senate and the Oklahoma House of Representatives. The Oklahoma Supreme Court and the Oklahoma Court of Criminal Appeals are the state's highest courts.

== General principles ==
The state government of Oklahoma is divided into an executive, a legislative and a judicial branch. The governor, the state's chief executive, has a degree of direct executive power but must share executive power with other statewide elected officers. The lieutenant governor serves as the first-in-line successor to the governorship should a vacancy occur.

The state legislature comprises the Oklahoma House of Representatives and the Oklahoma Senate. It passes statutes, votes on the budget, and controls the action of the executive through oversight and the power of impeachment. The President pro tempore of the Senate presides over the state senate and the Speaker of the House presides over the Oklahoma House of Representatives. Both officers are in line to succeed to the governorship in the event of a vacancy, behind the lieutenant governor.

The independent judiciary is based on the common law system which evolved from use in the British Empire. It is divided into the two courts of last resort, one (the Supreme Court) dealing with civil law and the other (the Court of Criminal Appeals) dealing with criminal law. The Court on the Judiciary is responsible for monitoring the activities of judges, except those of the Supreme Court. The Court of Impeachment monitors the activities of all statewide elected officials, including the justices of the Supreme Court.

== Constitution ==
A popular referendum approved the constitution of the Oklahoma on September 17, 1907, which came into effect upon Oklahoma's ratification of the United States Constitution on November 16, 1907. The ratification of both documents marked Oklahoma as the 46th US State.

The constitution contains a bill of rights in itself, but its preamble mentions the principles the government of Oklahoma is to uphold. The constitution's preamble states that the state government is to:

... secure and perpetuate the blessing of liberty; to secure just and rightful government; [and] to promote our mutual welfare and happiness ...

Among these foundational principles protected by the Oklahoma bill of rights are: political power derives from the consent of the people; the people have the inherent rights to life, liberty, the pursuit of happiness, and the enjoyment of the gains of their own industry; the right to peaceful assembly; a ban on the interference with suffrage; the definition of treason; the right to trial by jury; and that marriage in the State of Oklahoma is defined as being between a man and a woman.

== Legislative branch ==
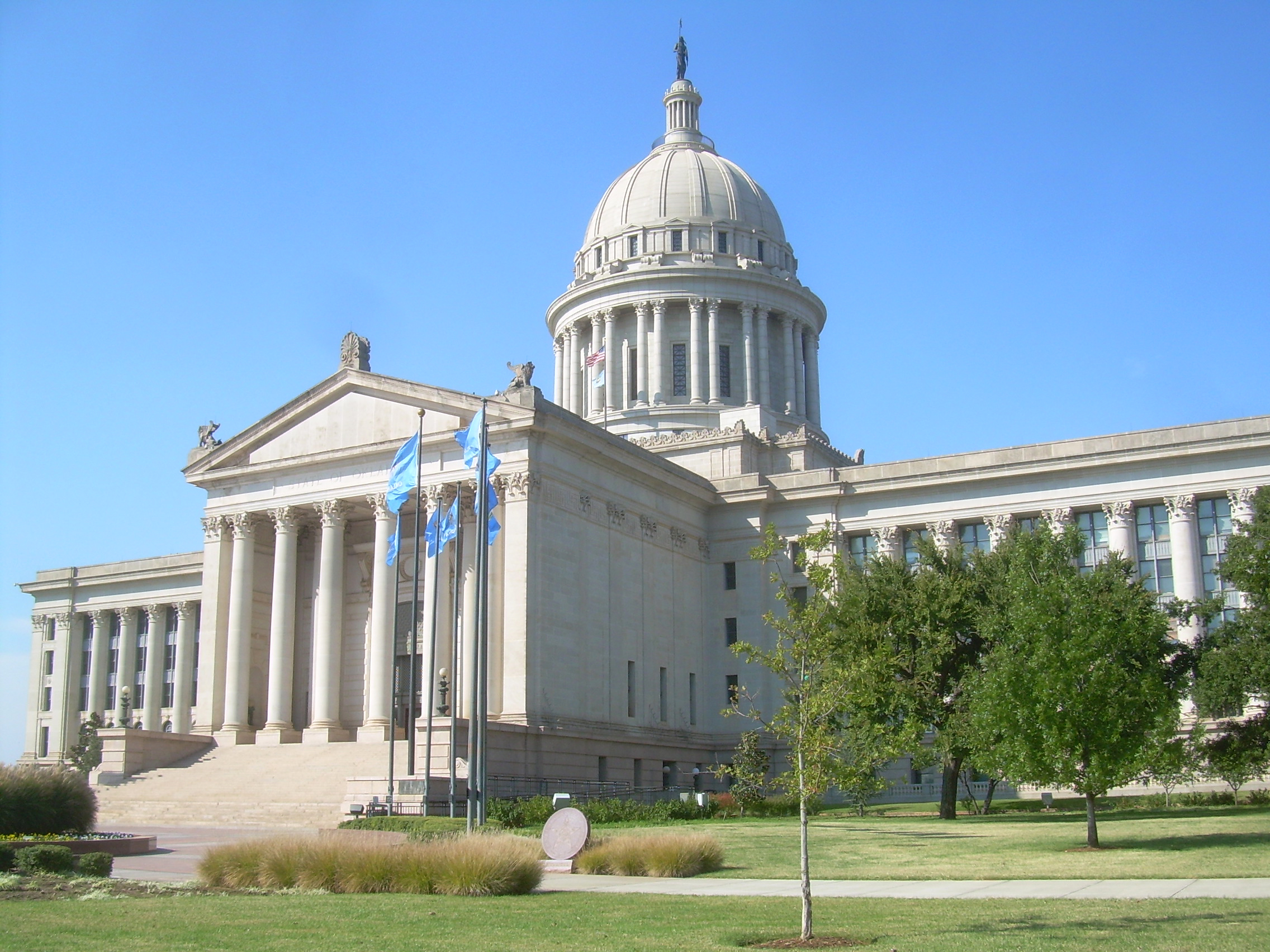
The Oklahoma Legislature meets in the Oklahoma State Capitol.

The legislative branch is the branch of the Oklahoma state government that creates the laws of Oklahoma. The Oklahoma Legislature, which makes up the legislative branch, consists of two chambers: the Senate and the House of Representatives. The state legislature has the power to levy and collect taxes, borrow money, and raise and maintain the militia of the state. The constitution grants the state legislature the authority to legislate on "rightful subjects" of legislation.

The Oklahoma Legislature meets for four months in regular session each year from February to May. However, under special circumstances, the governor or two-thirds of the state legislature's membership can call special sessions. The governor has a strong influence in shaping the agenda of the legislature. Legislation must be approved by a majority in both houses and signed by the governor to be enacted into law. However, should the governor veto the bill, the legislature, by a two-thirds vote in both houses, may overturn the governor's veto, and the bill be enacted into law without the governor's signature. On appropriations bills, however, the governor has a line-item veto.

Under the Oklahoma Constitution, members of both houses enjoy the privilege of being free from arrest, except for treason, felony, and breach of the peace. This immunity applies to members during sessions and when traveling to and from sessions. The constitution also guarantees absolute freedom of debate in both houses, providing, "for any speech or debate in either House, shall not be questioned in any other place." Members of the legislature are limited to a combined total of 12 years of service in the Oklahoma Legislature, regardless of house.

The Oklahoma Senate is the upper house of the state legislature with its 48 seats divided equally among the state's 48 senatorial districts. The state senators serve a four-year staggered term, with half of the Senate up for reelection every even-numbered year. The presiding officer in the state senate is the lieutenant governor in their role as President of the Senate. By tradition, the lieutenant governor presides in ceremonial occasions, leaving in charge the President pro tempore of the Oklahoma Senate, who is third in line to succeed the governor in the event of his removal from office.

The state senate is required to give their advice and consent to many executive branch appointments made by the governor.

The Oklahoma House of Representatives is the lower house of the state legislature with its 101 seats divided equally among the state's 101 house districts. Each member serves for a two-year term with the entire House up for reelection every even-numbered year. The presiding officer in the chamber is the Speaker of the Oklahoma House of Representatives, who is fourth in line to succeed the governor after the lieutenant governor and president pro tempore of the Oklahoma Senate.

Bills for raising revenue may only originate in the House of Representatives, though the state senate may alter and amend them as the body sees fit.

=== Current composition ===
In the 60th Legislature, the Republicans control both houses with an 81-20 majority in the House and a 40-8 majority in the Senate.

The Oklahoma House of Representatives

Affiliation	Members
Republican Party	81
Democratic Party	20
Seat Vacant	0
Total	101

The Oklahoma Senate

Affiliation	Members
Republican Party	40
Democratic Party	8
Seat Vacant	0
Total	48

=== Current leadership ===
The Oklahoma House of Representatives

Main office-holders
Office	Name	Party	Since
Speaker of the Oklahoma House	Kyle Hilbert	Republican	January 7, 2025
Speaker Pro Tempore of the House	Anthony Moore	Republican	January 7, 2025
Majority Leader	Mark Lawson	Republican	January 7, 2025
Minority Leader	Cyndi Munson	Democratic	January 3, 2023

The Oklahoma Senate

Main office-holders
Office	Name	Party	Since
President of the Senate and Lieutenant Governor	Matt Pinnell	Republican	January 14, 2019
President Pro Tempore of the Oklahoma Senate	Lonnie Paxton	Republican	January 7, 2025
Majority Floor Leader	Julie Daniels	Republican	January 7, 2025
Minority Leader	Julia Kirt	Democratic	January 7, 2025

== Executive branch ==
The executive branch is the branch of the Oklahoma state government that executes the laws of Oklahoma. The branch, consisting of over 300 state agencies, boards, and commissions, is headed by the Governor of Oklahoma, who is assisted by eleven other statewide officials.

=== Current executive branch ===
Office	Current Officer	Since	Party
Governor of Oklahoma	Kevin Stitt	January 14, 2019	Republican
Lieutenant Governor	Matt Pinnell	January 14, 2019	Republican
Secretary of State	Benjamin Lepak	October 2, 2025	Republican
State Auditor and Inspector	Cindy Byrd	January 14, 2019	Republican
Attorney General	Gentner Drummond	January 9, 2023	Republican
State Treasurer	Todd Russ	January 9, 2023	Republican
State School Superintendent	Lindel Fields	October 2, 2025	Republican
Labor Commissioner	Leslie Osborn	January 14, 2019	Independent (Note: Elected as a Republican, switched parties in 2026)
Insurance Commissioner	Glen Mulready	January 14, 2019	Republican
Corporation Commissioner (by length of tenure)	Todd Hiett	January 12, 2015	Republican
Corporation Commissioner	Kim David	January 12, 2023	Republican
Corporation Commissioner	Brian Bingman	January 13, 2025	Republican

=== Governor of Oklahoma ===
The governor is both head of state and head of government for Oklahoma. Under the constitution, the governor is elected to serve a four-year term. Originally, the governor was term-limited to only one term in office at a time but this has since been modified to allow up to two consecutive terms. The governor presides over the executive branch, commands the militia of the state, and makes sure that the laws of the state are enforced and that the peace is preserved. The governor is the state's chief representative and spokesperson to the other states within the United States, the United States federal government, and foreign nations. The governor must sign bills passed by the state legislature in order for those bills to become law. Should the governor veto a bill, the state legislature may override the veto with a two-thirds vote.

In certain emergencies, the governor may assume special, comprehensive powers. These powers involve greater police power and near-absolute control over the state, county, and local agencies and resources. During emergencies, the governor is also allowed a limited-form of rule by decree. State, county, and local officers and personnel become subject to the governor during the emergency and must obey the governor's directions. With the exception of the members of the state legislature, any official who fails to obey any order may be removed from office by the governor.

However, in normal times, the governor may not enact legislation or directly control the county and local agencies. The governor may issue executive orders (when empowered to do so by a specific provision of the Oklahoma Constitution or an act of the legislature) which are binding throughout the state. Such executive orders do not have the force of law and may only be issued when related directly to the governor's duties.

In order to be elected governor, any gubernatorial candidate is required to obtain a statewide plurality of votes cast in their election. Given the dominance of the two-party system, in Oklahoma (between the Democrats and the Republicans), the plurality is often a majority as well. However, in case the event that two or more candidates have an equal number of votes, the state legislature, by joint ballot, elects one of those candidates governor.

The constitution names the governor the state's chief magistrate and vested in him the supreme executive power. As a consequence, the governor is the preeminent figure in Oklahoma politics. The governor makes appointments when a vacancy exists in the executive branch. The governor appoints the heads of state departments and agencies as well as the members of most state commissioners and boards. However, these appointments do require Senate approval. Some appointments serve at the pleasure of the governor while others serve fixed terms.

=== Other elected officials ===
The Lieutenant Governor of Oklahoma is the second-highest official in the Oklahoma government and the first in line to succeed the governor in the event of a vacancy. Though both the governor and lieutenant governor are elected in the same year, the two are not running mates. In the absence or incapacity of the governor, the lieutenant governor assumes the powers and duties of the office of governor.

The lieutenant governor's main role is that of the president of the Oklahoma Senate, a position of limited de jure influence. The lieutenant governor's de facto power is based primarily upon the individual holding the office. When the governor and lieutenant governor are of the same political party, the governor often uses the lieutenant governor as a chief adviser or appointee. However, when they are of two different political parties, the lieutenant governor's influence is minimal.

Oklahoma also has nine other independent executive offices that do not owe loyalty to the governor as they are elected statewide and exercise authority outside the control of the governor. The general rule is that, while independent of the governor, the other statewide executive officers are at the disposal of the governor as he is the chief executive. This is enforced through statutory restriction on the independent offices' authority to act without the governor's approval and the ability of the governor to force the independent offices to act according to his will. The greatest power of the governor over the independent executive offices is the governor's ability to determine each office's annual budget.

These executive officers have some specialized regulatory power, some executive power, and some quasi-judicial power. The governor and state legislature often consult them on matters before enacting new laws.

The independent executive offices are as follows:

- The Attorney General of Oklahoma serves as the state's chief legal officer and adviser. Either the attorney general himself or one of his officers represents the state in litigation or hearing before boards and commissions. One of the main responsibilities of the attorney general is to issue opinions on laws to state officials. The attorney general can also call multi-county grand juries to investigate crimes that have occurred in more than one county.
- The Oklahoma State Treasurer is the administrator and manager of the state's depository of state funds collected by Oklahoma's various state agencies. The office's major duty is to select banks and investments in which to place state funds to yield profit for the state at large. The treasurer maintains an accurate account of the money received and distributed by the Oklahoma State Treasury. The Treasurer also delivers state warrants, checks, and bonds to the Oklahoma Office of State Finance.
- The Oklahoma Superintendent of Public Instruction, often referred to as the Oklahoma State School Superintendent, supervises and manages the public school system of the state and serves as the chair of the Oklahoma State Board of Education. The superintendent publishes school laws, opinions of the laws, and submits annual reports to the governor on the condition of public schools. The superintendent is also an ex officio member of the State Emergency Fund Board and chairman of the State Career Tech Board.
- The Oklahoma Insurance Commissioner administers state laws dealing with insurance companies operating in Oklahoma. The commissioner audits insurance companies to make certain that they pay claims to their policyholders. Whenever an insurance company faces financial issues, courts usually appoints the commissioner to serve as a trustee.
- The Oklahoma Corporation Commission consists of three commissioners, each of at least 30 years, serving staggered six-year terms. The three commissioners regulate public utility rates and supervise public utilities doing business within the State. The commission also regulates cotton gin, trucking, and public transportation businesses. The commission enforces oil and gas conservation laws and regulates pipeline companies. The commission is empowered to inspect the books and records of companies operating under their supervision and has extensive power to punish violators of its orders. In order to serve on the commission, a candidate cannot own personal interests within the companies the commission regulates.
- The Oklahoma State Auditor and Inspector prescribes a uniform system of bookkeeping for the county treasurers and the State Treasurer. Twice annually, without notice, the state auditor audits the books and accounts of the state treasurer and the county treasuries. If wrongdoing is suspected in the state, county, or local governments, the state auditor is empowered to investigate, audit the books of the suspect in question, and make recommendations to solve the problem.
- The Oklahoma Labor Commissioner is responsible for supervising the administration of state laws relating to labor and workplace safety and gathers and publishes information about the workforce of Oklahoma.

=== State Cabinet ===
With the exception of the independent constitutional executive offices, the executive branch is organized into agencies that are grouped together under cabinet positions to reduce the number of people who report directly to the governor. For example, the Oklahoma Department of Transportation and the Oklahoma Turnpike Authority are organized under the state transportation secretary.

The cabinet officers hold the title of "secretary". Agency heads are called "directors" or "commissioners". A cabinet secretary may serve concurrently as an agency director. The governor appoints, with the approval of the Oklahoma Senate, the cabinet. Each secretary advises the governor on policy changes or problems within the agencies under their supervision, represent the governor in administering their area of supervision, and coordinate information gathering for the governor or state legislature. The secretaries are not authorized to act without authorization by the governor through executive order.

The secretaries together make up the Oklahoma State Cabinet, which was created in 1986 under the Executive Branch Reform Act of 1986 to "improve the effectiveness, efficiency, and accountability of state government."

Within 45 days of assuming office, the governor must organize the cabinet. State law requires only the creation of a secretary for the state department of veteran affairs and for the information technology department. Within those first 45 days, the governor may create other secretary positions. The governor must create at least 10 positions, but no more than 16.

The Secretary of State of Oklahoma and the Adjutant General of Oklahoma are the only ex officio members of the Oklahoma State Cabinet. The Secretary of State does not head a department as the other secretaries do, but the Office of the Secretary of State instead. The Adjutant General is second-in-command of Oklahoma National Guard, under the governor, and serves as the chief military adviser to the governor and the head of the Military Department of Oklahoma as the Secretary of the Military.

== Judicial branch ==
The judicial system of Oklahoma is the branch of the Oklahoma state government that interprets the state's laws and constitution. Headed by the Supreme Court, the judiciary consists of two courts of last resort, courts of general jurisdiction, and courts of limited jurisdiction. Also, the Oklahoma judiciary contains two independent courts. The split court of last resort system (with the Oklahoma Supreme Court handling civil matters and the Oklahoma Court of Criminal Appeals handling criminal matters) exists only in Oklahoma and neighboring Texas.

Judges and justices requiring appointment are appointed by the governor. Candidates must first go through a nominating process through the Oklahoma Judicial Nominating Commission, which selects three candidates to submit to the governor for a single selection to the office.

=== High court ===
The Oklahoma Supreme Court consists of chief justice, a vice-chief justice, and seven associate justices who are appointed by the governor from a list of three judges submitted by the Judicial Nomination Commission. Justices are put on the ballot during the next general election for the electorate to retain that justice or not. Justices serve six years terms and then are put up for another retention election. Justices serve until they resign, fail to be retained in office, are removed from office by the Court on the Judiciary, or are impeached by the legislative branch. The Supreme Court's decisions are binding on lower state courts.

The court has original jurisdiction and general superintendent control over inferior courts in the judiciary and agencies, commissions, and boards exercising power under the constitution. The court has appellate jurisdiction co-extensive with that of the state's borders on cases "at law and in equity" except criminal cases, in which the Court of Criminal Appeals has exclusive appellate jurisdiction. If in any event there is any conflict in determining which court has jurisdiction, the state supreme court is granted the power to determine which court has jurisdiction, with no appeal from the court's determination.

The Supreme Court is headquartered in the Oklahoma State Capitol in Oklahoma City, Oklahoma and hears oral arguments each year.

The Supreme Court supervises the lower courts through the Administrative Office of the Courts and also supervises Oklahoma's legal profession through the Oklahoma Bar Association. Lawyer admissions and disbarment are done through recommendations of the association, which are then routinely ratified by the state supreme court. The association has approximately 11,000 active attorneys in Oklahoma and a total membership of more than 15,000.

Five of the nine justices are required to affirm, modify, or overturn any ruling of any lower court. Once the court has reached a decision, one justice is selected to write the court's opinion. Once published, the opinion becomes the controlling factor in the state's law surrounding the issue(s) it addresses. This is known as stare decisis.

The justices select from among their members a chief justice and vice chief justice to serve a two-year term. The Chief Justice of Oklahoma is responsible for the administration of the courts in the Oklahoma Judiciary and establishes rules for the courts to follow. The chief justice also oversees practicing attorneys in the state.

=== Appellate and district courts ===
The Oklahoma Court of Criminal Appeals consists of a presiding judge and four judges who are appointed by the governor from a list of three judges submitted by the Judicial Nomination Commission. Justices are also ratified by the electorate at the next general election following their appointment and at the end of each six-year term. Justices serve until they resign or fail to be retained in office. The Supreme Court's decisions are binding on lower state courts.

Unlike most states, Oklahoma has two courts of last resort. The Supreme Court determines issues of a civil nature, and the Oklahoma Court of Criminal Appeals decides criminal matters. Unlike the Supreme Court, the Court of Criminal Appeal has mandatory review jurisdiction whenever a sentence from a lower court involved the death sentence.

Court of Appeal justices is selected, confirmed, and ratified in the same manner as the justices of the Oklahoma Supreme Court.

The state created the Oklahoma Court of Civil Appeals because the Oklahoma Supreme Court had neither the time nor resources to hear every case brought before it. When a case is brought before the state supreme court, the justices can choose to send the case to one of the four divisions of the Court of Civil Appeals, two located in Tulsa and two in Oklahoma City. Each division of the court has three judges, appointed for life, but must stand for election every six years to retain their positions.

Two of the three judges may choose to reaffirm, modify, or overturn any ruling of any lower court. However, if the Oklahoma Supreme Court disapproves of the court's ruling, it may review the decision and change it as the court deems necessary.

Each of Oklahoma's 77 counties has its own district court. The district courts have general jurisdiction over civil and criminal matters, with the exception of certain limited areas like workers' compensation where original jurisdiction is reserved by statute to other courts. Each district court is presided over by either single or multiple district judges with at least one associate district judge to administer justice in each county. The judges are elected, in a nonpartisan manner, to serve a four-year term. In the event of a vacancy in any of the district courts, the governor appoints a judge to serve until the next elections. In the event of a heavy caseload in the district, a special judge may be appointed to assist the district judge.

The 77 district courts are divided into 27 districts, with each district having at least one district judge over the associate district judges. Above the 27 districts are nine judicial administrative districts, involving several districts, to assure an organized system. From among the district judges of the judicial administrative districts, one is selected to serve as the presiding judge, who is responsible for the administrative matters of their district. The presiding judge answers to the Supreme Court.

Civil appeals are heard by the Oklahoma Supreme Court and criminal appeals are heard by the Oklahoma Court of Criminal Appeals.

District judges must live in the district in which they are seeking election. Associate judges must have been a practicing lawyer or judge for the past two years. There are a total of about 71 district judges, 77 associate district judges, and 78 special district judges.

=== Courts of limited jurisdiction ===
The Workers' Compensation Court is a special court of ten judges that hears worker's compensation claims. The judges are selected by the governor to serve a six-year term. Claims submitted are heard by a single judge in either Tulsa or Oklahoma City. If a party disapproves of the judge's ruling, they may appeal to a three-judge panel called the Court En Banc. Appeals for the Court En Banc are heard by the Oklahoma Supreme Court.

The Court on Tax Review is a special court in the Oklahoma judiciary charged with hearing disputes involving illegal taxes levied by county and city governments. Tax review cases are sent to the Chief Justice of Oklahoma, who then sends the claim to the presiding judge of the administration district from which the claim originated. The presiding judge then appoints three judges to serve as the Court on Tax Review. Appeals from the court are heard by the Oklahoma Supreme Court.

=== Independent judicial bodies ===
Though part of Oklahoma's court system, there are two courts that operate without the oversight of the Oklahoma Supreme Court.

The Oklahoma Court on the Judiciary, one of the two independent courts, is responsible for removing judges from their position if they have committed illegal acts. One of two such courts in the United States, the court ensures that other courts best administer justice. The Oklahoma Court on the Judiciary consists of a nine-member trial division and a five-member appellate division. The court's jurisdiction may be called into force by the governor, attorney general, Oklahoma Supreme Court, the Oklahoma Bar Association, or by the Oklahoma House of Representatives. Also, private citizens can file a formal complaint against a judge to be heard by the Oklahoma Council on Judicial Complaints. If the complaint is approved, the case is heard by the trial division of the court.

Cases brought before the court are heard by the trial division. Any appeals from the trial division are heard by the appellate division. There are no appeals from the appellate division's decisions, and not even the Oklahoma Supreme Court may change its rulings.

The Oklahoma Senate serves as the Court of Impeachment, the second independent court in the Oklahoma judiciary. Impeachment charges are brought by the Oklahoma House of Representatives, and they are heard by the state senate, with the Chief Justice of Oklahoma presiding, unless the chief justice or any member of the Oklahoma Supreme Court is charged, in which case the state senate shall select one of its own members to preside.

Impeachment charges may only be brought against the governor and other statewide officials (including justices) for willful neglect of duty, corruption in office, habitual drunkenness, incompetency, or any offense involving moral turpitude committed while in office. If impeached, officials are immediately suspended in discharging their duties. Should the impeachment fails, the officer in question returns to their duties. However, if the impeachment is successful and the defendant found guilty, the person is removed from office.

The Oklahoma Judicial Nominating Commission is a body that selects potential justices and judges for gubernatorial appointments for judicial positions on Oklahoma's appellate courts. In the event of a vacancy, for whatever reason, within the Oklahoma Supreme Court or appellate courts, the commission screens a list of applicants that desire that job. The commission selects three qualified nominees and presents the names to the governor, who may appoint one of the nominees. If the governor fails to appoint a nominee to the position within sixty days, the Chief Justice of Oklahoma may make the selection.

== County government ==
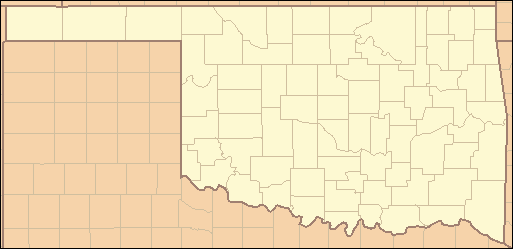

The county is the primary administrative division of Oklahoma. They are bodies politic and corporate. There are seventy-seven counties in the state. Counties contain a number of towns and cities as well as unincorporated land in the state. Every county has a county seat, often a populous or centrally located city or town, where the county government is headquartered.

In traditional Midwest fashion, counties in Oklahoma possess a moderate scope of power. As extensions of the state government, counties are primarily administrative bodies that possess executive and limited judicial powers, but not legislative powers. Their primary responsibilities are related to managing, planning, and governing unincorporated land within their borders. The counties keep records of deaths, births, marriages, divorces, property ownership, and court activities within the county. The counties must also maintain a court system, law enforcement, road and bridge construction, and voter registration.

As extensions of the state government, the counties are responsible for six major services:

- Maintaining the peace and protecting life and property
- Assessing and collecting taxes to operate the county
- Compile, record, and preserve public records essential to maintaining individual property rights
- Building and maintain public roads, highways, and bridges
- Providing facilities for courts and the administration of justice through the District Court system
- Caring for the needy and indigent, orphaned children, and the aged

Each county government is composed of eight elected officials and a district attorney. County officials serve four-year terms beginning on the first Monday in January following their election. Each county is headed by a Board of County Commissioners consisting of three elected county commissioners. The board serves as the quasi-head of government, with the chair of the board as the quasi-head of state, of the county. Each county is divided into three districts drawn based on equal population. From each of the three districts, a county commissioner is elected independently from the other two commissioners. The three commissioners serve collegiately, with each having equal voting powers and a yearly rotating chairmanship.

The board supervises county administration, manages property owned by the county, prepares the county budget (unless the county has adopted the County Budget Board), and advertises bids for major county purchases and contracts. The commission is also empowered to audit and approve claims against the county, propose county bonds, and audit the accounts of all other county offices. The board's other duties include the maintenance of traffic control devices, the power to approve zoning applications, and the administration of federal funds provided to the county.

Only the board may purchase equipment, machinery, supplies, or materials of any kind for the county, and all contracts and agreements relating to the leasing or rental of county equipment or otherwise relating to the business of the county are negotiated by the commission. It is in the name of the county commission that the county sues and is sued. The board meets on or before the first Monday of each month and may stay in session for as long as the commission determines. However, the board must adjourn by the last business day of each month. Should the board adjourn before the last business day of a month, the county clerk may call the board into a special session. Meetings of the board are open to the public.

The County Sheriff is the chief law enforcement officer in the county and peace officer. The sheriff must be at least 25 years old, have been a resident of Oklahoma for two years, a qualified elector in the county, and possess at least a high school diploma. In counties with over 80,000 citizens, the sheriff must be a certified peace officer at the election. However, in counties with under 80,000 citizens, the sheriff is given up to 12 months after the election to become certified.

When it comes to the responsibilities of the sheriff, Oklahoma's outlaw history has bestowed the sheriff with what is seen as full services, that is, providing traditional law-enforcement functions, including countywide patrol and investigations irrespective of municipal boundaries. As the chief peace officer, the sheriff is responsible for ensuring the peace is preserved, riots are suppressed, and that unlawful assemblies and insurrections are controlled. The sheriff is vested with the power to form a posse of able-bodied men to assist him in controlling riots and lawlessness. The sheriff also serves as the executor of court orders and other lawful authorities within the county. To ensure justice is administered, the sheriff is empowered to apprehend any person charged with a felony or breach of the peace and may attend any court within the county.

In order to prevent the sheriff from abusing their position, the sheriff is required to account for funds collected by the office and to make a monthly report to the county commissioners.

While not a county official since 1967, the District Attorney replaced the County Attorney as the chief legal officer of the county. There are 27 judicial districts with one District Attorney serving all counties located within their district. The main purpose of the office is the prosecution of all criminal actions that occur in counties in their district as well as prosecuting and defending all civil action in which any county in their district is concerned. To perform their duties, the district attorneys are empowered to appoint assistant district attorneys, investigators, and clerks so that each county in their districts has at least one assistant district attorney. As members of the state executive branch, officers and offices under the district attorney are paid by the state and not the county.

Alongside the three county commissioners, the county sheriff, and the District Attorney, are four other county offices:

- The County Clerk serves as the county's official record keeper and serves as the Secretary for the County Commission. The county clerk is the county's bookkeeper, auditing and paying the salaries and claims for the county. The clerk is thus empowered to write checks to all local governments for their appropriate funds. Medical licenses, tax records, and tax deeds are filed with the county clerk. The clerk is also the county's official registrar of deeds.
- The District Court Clerk is responsible for recording, filing, and maintaining the records of the civil and criminal cases brought before the District Court. The clerk also collects and accounts for the court's fines and costs. The court clerk maintains the court schedule, keeps a record of jurors and witnesses, issues subpoenas, certain licenses, and is answerable to the Oklahoma Supreme Court for the District Court's statistics.
- The County Assessor is the core of the Oklahoma property tax system. The assessor is required to establish the market and taxable value of real and business property in the county. Each year, the assessor prepares ex assessments and submits them to the county treasurer. The assessor does not raise or lower the property tax, only sets the value of the property.
- The County Treasurer is charged with the collection of taxes certified by the county assessor. After collection, the taxes are distributed by the treasurer according to the county budget. The treasure also serves as the official custodian of county funds. Warrants and vouchers for county departments are managed by the treasurer's office.

== Municipal government ==
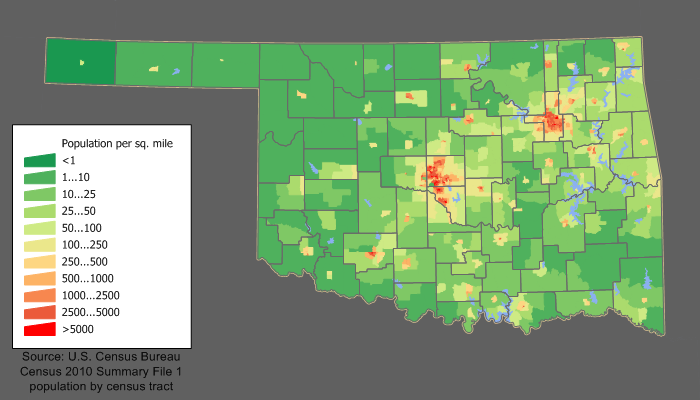
Map of Oklahoma, showing population density

Within Oklahoma there are two types of municipal governments cities and towns. To be a city, a community must have a population of at least 1,000. Both are municipal corporations in that they can both sue and be sued, may own and sell property, create debt, and may levy and collect taxes. They are the most basic level of government in Oklahoma and are also the most accessible.

The term of office of municipal officials is four years with elections held on the first Tuesday of April of each odd-numbered year.

Any area in Oklahoma, regardless of population, may incorporate. The county commission supervises incorporations in their county. Persons wishing to incorporate must first provide an accurate survey of the area to be incorporated. Next, within thirty days of applying for incorporation, a census must be taken to show the number of people living in the area to be incorporated. The petition to incorporate must include the signature of at least one-third of those people. The commission must then hold a hearing to determine the accuracy of the petition, survey, and census. If the commission is satisfied that all requirements have been met, it must issue a writ of election for an election to occur within ten days. If a majority of the qualified voters of the area to be incorporated approve of the incorporation, the community is declared incorporated and assumes the appropriate municipal government.

=== Towns ===
In Oklahoma, a town governed by a board of trustees is the simplest government type in Oklahoma. The board is composed of three or five members, each representing a ward, and elected at large by the town. The board exercises both executive and legislative functions. The trustees elect from among themselves a president of the board, who presides over the board and serves as mayor of the town. The mayor is the head of state for the town and, depending on their duties, may serve as the head of government of the town. The judicial branch is known as the municipal court, which is a court of no-record in Oklahoma's judicial system.

The town board of trustees appoints and removes town officers and employees as provided by law or ordinance, maintains the public peace and order, enacts municipal legislation and punishment for its violation, raises revenue, makes appropriations, manages the fiscal affairs of the town, inspects the books and accounts maintained by the town treasurer, investigates municipal affairs, creates and abolishes divisions of the town government, and grants pardons for violation of municipal ordinances.

A major responsibility of a town is the construction and maintenance of streets, parks, and sewers for the town to use as well as maintaining public peace. Within each town are three major officials, either elected by the town as a whole or appointed by the board:

- The town clerk serves as the secretary of the board and keeps the journal of the proceedings of the board meetings. The clerk enrolls ordinances and resolutions passed by the board and has custody of town documents, records, and archives, as well as the town seal. It is the duty of the clerk to attest and affix the seal of the town to official town documents.
- The town treasurer maintains accounts and books of the town to show where and from what source all monies paid to him have been derived and to whom and when any monies have been paid. The treasurer deposits the daily funds received for the town in depositories as the board designates.
- The town marshal, officially known as the town chief of police, enforces municipal ordinances. The marshal appoints town police officers subject to the approval and confirmation of the board.

When a town's population reaches one thousand, the municipal incorporation remains classified as a town unless a majority of the qualified voters of the community approve of a change to city government.

=== Cities ===
In Oklahoma, a city is a highly autonomous incorporated area either contained within a county or spanning multiple counties. According to the state constitution, any community with a population of more than 2,000 can become a city. State law further stipulates that a city must have at least 1,000 inhabitants. City governments provide the same services as towns but are organized in a different manner under one of four possible governance structures.

In an aldermanic or weak mayor-council structure, the city is governed by an elected at-large mayor and two councilmembers from each ward, forming the city council. The mayor serves as the presiding officer of the council and the head of state and head of government of the city, but does not vote on the council unless to break a tie vote. The council also elects a council president that can act in the mayor's absence. As the chief executive officer of the city government, the mayor appoints city officers with the council's oversight and can remove, suspend, and directly oversee city officers and employees. The mayor prepares an annual budget and submits it to the council, advises the council on the city's finances and future needs, makes recommendations, enforces city ordinances, and maintains the public peace. The council is responsible for enacting municipal legislation, revenue and spending decisions, and creating or abolishing city divisions.

The governing body of a council-manager city is a city council composed of one councilmember from each ward of the city and one at-large councilmember. The council elects from among its members a mayor to preside over meetings and a vice-mayor to preside in his absence. Though recognized as head of state of the city, the mayor has no regular administrative duties except for signing conveyances and other written obligations of the city as the council requires. If a vacancy occurs in the office of mayor, the vice-mayor becomes the mayor for the remainder of the unexpired term. Aside from passing ordinances and raising city revenue, the council is responsible for appointing a city manager to serve as the head of government for the city. The city manager is the chief executive officer of the administrative branch of the city government. He is responsible to the council for executing the laws and administering the government of the city. Most city officials are appointed and removed by the city manager without prior council approval. The city manager also supervises and controls administrative departments, prepares an annual budget for the council to approve, and is to keep the council advised of the financial condition and future needs of the city.

The strong mayor–council city is the third form of city government provided for in Oklahoma law. The governing body of a strong mayor city consists of the mayor, who is elected at large, and one councilmember from each ward of the city. The mayor serves as an ex officio councilmember at large and presides over meetings of the council. As the councilmember at large, the mayor has the powers, rights, privileges, duties, and responsibilities of any other councilmember, including the right to vote on questions. The mayor serves as both head of state and head of government for the city as the city's chief executive officer. He is responsible to the people of the city for executing the laws and for administering the government of the city. In the event of martial law, the Governor of Oklahoma must recognize the mayor as head of the city. The mayor appoints and removes most city officials without prior council approval, supervises and controls city departments, prepares the annual budget for council approval, keeps the council advised of the financial condition and future needs of the city, and may grant pardons for violations of city ordinances upon the recommendation of the municipal judge.

A unique feature of a strong-mayor city is the presence of a city personnel board to ensure that a merit system is employed by the city. The personnel board consists of three members elected by the council for staggered six-year terms. The board elects from among its members a chair and vice-chair. The personnel board also elects a secretary who need not be a member of the board.

In strong-mayor form, city employees that are not elected, appointed, or confirmed by the council, members and secretaries of boards, commissions, and other plural authorities, and personnel who serve without compensation are part of the classified service. Neither the mayor nor any other authority may appoint or promote any person in the classified service of the city for any political reason but only for merit and fitness. Any qualified elector of the city may bring an allegation of a violation of the merit system before the personnel board for consideration and determination. Following a public hearing on the issues, if the board finds to its satisfaction that the appointment or promotion was made in violation of the merit system, it then vetoes the appointment or promotion.

No officer or employee in the classified service may:

... actively influence, or actively attempt to influence, or work actively for, the nomination, election or defeat of any candidate for mayor or councilmember.

— Oklahoma State Statutes

Officers and employees are not prohibited from the ordinary exercise of their right as a citizen to express his opinions and to vote. An officer or employee who violates the merit system may be removed from office or position either by the authority normally having the power to remove him, or, after adequate opportunity for a public hearing, by the personnel board. An officer or employee who violates this section of the merit system is forbidden to hold any office or position in the city government for four years.

Whenever a city officer or employee is laid off, suspended, demoted, or removed from office, that officer or employee may appeal the action to the personnel board. The appeal must be in writing and must be filed with the secretary or chair of the personnel board within ten days after the effective date of the layoff, suspension, demotion, or removal. The personnel board must then hold a public hearing on the appeal. The personnel board must submit a report of its findings and recommendations to the mayor. The mayor then makes the final decision regarding the appellant's layoff, suspension, demotion, or removal. However, if the personnel board finds to its satisfaction that the layoff, suspension, demotion, or removal was made for a political reason, it shall veto the layoff, suspension, demotion, or removal.

Home Rule allows a city with a population of over 2,000 people to establish its own form of government under a City Charter.

Regardless of the city's form of government, must include the following officials, either elected or appointed:

- The city clerk serves as the Secretary of the Council and keeps the journal of the proceedings of the Council. The Clerk enrolls the ordinances and resolutions passed by the Council and has custody of all city documents, records, and archives, as well as the town seal. It is the duty of the Clerk to attest and affix the seal of the town to all official city documents.
- The city treasurer maintains accounts and books of the city to show where and from what source all monies paid to him have been derived and to whom and when any monies have been paid. The Treasurer deposits the daily funds received for the city in depositories as the Council designates.
- The city police chief enforces municipal ordinances and supervises city police officers.
- The city attorney heads the Legal Department and handles the legal matters of the city.
- The city street commissioner heads the street department which is responsible for general supervision over maintenance and repair of public streets in the city.

== See also ==
- Oklahoma Democratic Party
- Oklahoma Green Party
- Oklahoma Libertarian Party
- Oklahoma Republican Party
- Political party strength in Oklahoma
- Republicanism in the United States
