= Oklahoma Hall of Fame =

Coordinates: 35°29′00″N 97°31′34″W

The Oklahoma Hall of Fame was founded in 1927 by Anna B. Korn to officially celebrate Statehood Day, recognize Oklahomans dedicated to their communities, and provide educational programming for all ages. The first Oklahoma Hall of Fame Induction Ceremony was held the next year, inducting the first two members into the hall of fame. In the 1970s, the Hefner Mansion was donated to the association to house the exhibits and busts or portraits of the inductees, and the organization changed its name to the Oklahoma Heritage Association in 1971. It then moved into the former Mid-Continent Life Building in Oklahoma City in 2007 and opened the Gaylord-Pickens Museum with interactive exhibits. In 2015, the organization changed its name for the final time to the Oklahoma Hall of Fame, in order to better represent the goals and mission of the organization.

To be eligible for induction, an individual must satisfy the following criteria:

- Reside in Oklahoma or be a former resident of the state.
- Have performed outstanding service to humanity, the State of Oklahoma and the United States.
- Be known for their public service throughout the state.

In 2000, the rules were changed to allow for posthumous nominations.

Portraits of the inductees can be seen at the Gaylord-Pickens Museum in Oklahoma City. As of 2020, 714 members have been inducted since 1928, with more inducted annually.

Oklahoma Hall of Fame Gaylord-Pickens Museum in Oklahoma City March 2025

== Notable inductees ==
†Indicates a posthumous inductee

=== 1920s ===
==== 1928 ====
- Dennis Thomas Flynn (U.S. congressman), representative for Oklahoma Territory's at-large congressional district (1893–1897)
- Elizabeth Fulton Hester (civic leader)

==== 1929 ====
- James S. Buchanan (educator), 4th president of the University of Oklahoma (1924–1925)
- Charles Francis Colcord (oilman)
- Alice Mary Robertson (U.S. congressman), representative for Oklahoma's 2nd congressional district (1921–1923)
- Richard A. Sneed (military), Confederate Army veteran and Oklahoma Secretary of State (1923–1927; 1931–1935) and Oklahoma State Treasurer (1927–1931)

=== 1930s ===
==== 1930 ====
- David Ross Boyd (educator), 1st president of the University of Oklahoma (1892–1908)
- Alice Brown Davis (Seminole chief), chief of the Seminole Nation of Oklahoma 1922–1935
- Edward K. Gaylord (publisher)
- Annette Ross Hume (civic leader)
- John Graves Leeper (public servant)
- Frank Phillips (oilman)
- Joseph W. Scroggs (educator)

==== 1931 ====
- Charles F. Barrett (military)
- Laura A. Clubb (philanthropist)
- Gregory Gerrer (artist/religious leader)
- Roy V. Hoffman (military)
- Douglas H. Johnston (Chickasaw governor)
- Ernest W. Marland (governor)
- Benjamin Nihart (educator)
- Joseph B. Thoburn (historian)

==== 1932 (25th anniversary of Oklahoma) ====
- Frank M. Bailey (jurist), member of the Oklahoma Supreme Court (1919–1921)
- Joseph Blatt (religious leader)
- Fowler Border (physician)
- Fred S. Clinton (oilman)
- John B. Connors (public servant)
- John Hazelton Cotteral (jurist)
- John B. Doolin (public servant)
- William A. Durant (public servant)
- F.B. Fite (physician)
- Frank Frantz (public servant)
- Thomas P. Gore (U.S. senator)
- Charles Haskell (governor)
- Frederick W. Hawley (religious leader)
- William Miller Jenkins (public servant)
- Walter A. Ledbetter (attorney)
- Jasper L. McBrien (educator)
- Grant McGee (journalist)
- John Jasper Methvin (missionary)
- Joseph Samuel Murrow (missionary)
- James F. Owens (business executive)
- Gabe E. Parker (educator/public servant)
- David Phillip Richardson (physician)
- Will Rogers (actor/civic leader/journalist)
- Campbell Russell (attorney/public servant/rancher)
- Jasper Sipes (entrepreneur)
- Sidney Suggs (publisher)
- Elmer Thomas (U.S. senator)
- Charles P. Wickmiller (pharmacist)

==== 1933 ====
- John A. Brown (merchant)
- Madeline B. Conkling (public servant)
- Edward Everett Dale (historian)
- Elva Shartel Ferguson (publisher)
- Bella Gibbons (educator)
- John A. Hatchett (physician)
- John Francis Kroutil (entrepreneur)
- Daniel William Peery (public servant)
- Una Lee Roberts (civic leader)
- Angie Russell (civic leader)
- Angelo C. Scott (educator)
- Charles Bingley Stuart (attorney/jurist)

==== 1934 ====
- Eugene M. Antrim (educator)
- Maude Richman Calvert (educator)
- Emma Estill-Harbour (educator)
- Grant Foreman (historian)
- William Wirt Hastings (U.S. congressman)
- Samuel W. Hayes (jurist)
- Travis F. Hensley (public servant)
- Thomas P. Howell (physician)
- Charles William Kerr (religious leader)
- Everett S. Lain (physician)
- Pawnee Bill (entrepreneur)
- Zack Miller (rancher)
- Frances F. Threadgill (civic leader)
- Clara Wilbanks Waters (administrator)

==== 1935 ====
- Czarina Conlan (civic leader)
- Etta D. Dale (educator)
- Charles Newton Gould (author/educator)
- David W. Griffin (physician)
- Edith Cherry Johnson (journalist)
- Roberta Lawson (civic leader)
- Oscar J. Lehrer (educator)
- W. H. McFadden (civic leader)
- Robert M. McFarlin (oilman)
- Ida May McFarlin (philanthropist)
- Lewis Jefferson Moorman (physician)
- Mell A. Nash (educator)
- Jennie Harris Oliver (author)
- E. B. Ringland (minister)
- Winonah Leah Monroney Sanger (physician)
- Mary Frances Troy (educator)

==== 1936 ====
- William Bizzell (educator)
- Alice David (civic leader)
- Rachel Caroline Eaton (historian)
- Annette Blackburn Ehler (civic leader)
- Sargent Prentiss Freeling (public service)
- Forney Hutchinson (religious leader)
- William S. Key (military)
- W. H. Kornegay (attorney)
- LeRoy Long (physician)
- James W. Maney (entrepreneur)
- M. Alice Miller (civic leader)

==== 1937 (30th anniversary of Oklahoma) ====
- Mabel Bassett (public servant)
- A. G. C. Bierer (jurist)
- Elmer E. Brown (journalist)
- Frank Carter (public servant)
- Dorothea B. Dale (public servant)
- James S. Davenport (jurist)
- Clarence B. Douglas (military)
- John Franklin Easley (publisher)
- Lucia Loomis Ferguson (civic leader)
- Ida Ferguson (nurse)
- Albert L. Kates (publisher)
- James R. Keaton (jurist)
- Lilah Denton Lindsey (educator)
- Margaret McVean (attorney)
- Jessie Moore (attorney)
- Boss Sebastian Neff (rancher)
- Minnie Shockley (educator)
- Ida Belle Wright (historian)

==== 1938 ====
- Henry G. Bennett (educator)
- Maimee Lee Robinson Browne (civic leader)
- Scott Ferris (U.S. congressman)
- Carolyn T. Foreman (historian)
- Everette Fry (manager)
- John W. Harreld (U.S. senator)
- Walter Harrison (journalist)
- Abbie B. Rich Hillerman (prohibitionist)
- Patrick J. Hurley (diplomat)
- William B. Johnson (attorney)
- Henry S. Johnston (governor)
- Arthur N. Leecraft (public servant)
- Bohumil Makovsky (educator)
- John Bruce Nichlos (oilman)
- G. Lee Phelps (missionary)
- Jane Gibson Phillips (civic leader)
- William B. Pine (U.S. senator)
- George Rainey (educator)
- Scott Preston Squyres (attorney)
- Martin E. Trapp (governor)
- E.A. Walker (banker)
- Anna L. Witteman (civic leader)

==== 1939 ====
- O. H. P. Brewer Jr. (public servant)
- Cassius M. Cade (business executive)
- Nancy "Nannie" K. Fite (public servant)
- George Riley Hall (publisher)
- John B. Harrison (jurist)
- Lillian Gallup Haskell (civic leader)
- Blanche Fallis Lucas (civic leader)
- Isaac Newton McCash (educator)
- James I. Phelps (jurist)
- Meta Chestnutt Sager (educator)
- William Skelly (oilman)
- Kathryn Van Leuven (attorney)
- A.M. Wallock (religious leader)

=== 1940s ===
==== 1940 ====
- George Walter Archibald (publisher)
- Jesse C. Bushyhead (physician)
- Frank Buttram (oilman)
- Nannie Cleveland (educator)
- Milton C. Garber (U.S. congressman)
- Everette B. Howard (U.S. congressman)
- Letitia Ledbetter (civic leader)
- Anna Lewis (historian)
- Eugene Lorton (publisher)
- Chris Madsen (Law enforcement)
- Alma J. Neill (physiology)
- Lutie Hailey Walcott (civic leader)
- Muriel Hazel Wright (historian)

==== 1941 ====
- Ella Lamb Classen (civic leader)
- Julien Charles Monnet (educator)
- Robert L. Owen (U.S. senator)
- William Mark Sexson (religious leader)
- Edgar Sullins Vaught (jurist)

==== 1942 ====
- Stanley Vestal (historian)
- Houston B. Teehee (public servant)
- Lewis Haines Wentz (oilman)

==== 1943 ====
- Gladys Anderson Emerson (educator)
- O.C. Newman (physician)
- Waite Phillips (oilman)
- Janie Stewart (educator)

==== 1944 ====
- John R. Abernathy (religious leader)
- Kenneth C. Kaufman (author/educator)
- Burton Rascoe (author)
- Paul Sears (botanist)

==== 1945 ====
- Joseph P. Blickensderfer (educator)
- Roy Gittinger (historian)
- Raymond S. McLain (military)
- Paul A. Walker (educator)

==== 1946 ====
- Robert Burns (public servant)
- Frances Dinsmore Davis (fine arts instructor)
- Charles Evans (educator)
- Mark R. Everett (physician)

==== 1947 (40th anniversary of Oklahoma) ====
- William Green Beasley (religious leader)
- Yvonne Chouteau (ballerina)
- Daniel Luther Edwards (religious leader)
- John Elmer Mabee (oilman)

==== 1948 ====
- Roy Temple House (literature)
- Mattie O. Watts Kimes (artist)
- Fred Lookout (Osage chief)
- Edward H. Moore (oilman)
- Lynn Riggs (playwright)

==== 1949 ====
- Nina Kay Gore (civic leader)
- Robert A. Hefner (oilman)
- Oscar Jacobson (artist/educator)
- Irene Bowers Sells (journalist)
- Poe B. Vandament (publisher)

=== 1950s ===
==== 1950 ====
- Angie Debo (historian)
- Norris G. Henthorne (journalist)
- Jay G. Puterbaugh (entrepreneur)
- Waldo E. Stephens (internationalist)
- Jim Thorpe (Olympian)
- Louis A. Turley (medicine)

==== 1951 ====
- Joseph Horace Benton (opera singer)
- Eugene S. Briggs (educator)
- George Lynn Cross (educator)
- Luther Harrison (journalist)
- Ernest Lachman (physician)
- Perle Mesta (civic leader)
- William H. Murray (governor)
- C. I. Pontius (educator)

==== 1952 ====
- George Lynn Bowman (public servant)
- Joseph J. Clark (military)
- Everette Lee DeGolyer (geologist)
- Thomas Gilcrease (oilman)
- J. Raymond Hinshaw Jr. (physician)
- Richard Lloyd Jones (publisher)
- Savoie Lottinville (author)

==== 1953 ====
- C.B. Bee (public servant)
- James E. Berry (public servant)
- William J. Holloway (governor)
- Roy Johnson (oilman)
- James C. Nance (public servant)
- Pearl M. Sayre (civic leader)
- Nan Sheets (artist)
- Gomer Griffith Smith (U.S. congressman)

==== 1954 ====
- Felix M. Adams (physician)
- J.R. Hinshaw (physician)
- Louise Davis McMahon (music)
- Maud Lorton Myers (civic leader)
- John L. Peters (humanitarian)
- Theodore 'T.H.' Henry Steffens (humanitarian)

==== 1955 ====
- Annetta A. Childs (civic leader)
- F. Hiner Dale (public servant/jurist)
- Paul Harvey (radio commentator)
- Gaston Litton (historian)
- James Cash Penney (business executive)
- Ross Rizley (U.S. congressman)

==== 1956 ====
- Charles Blake Goddard (oilman)
- Robert S. Kerr (governor)
- Jesse Lee Rader (historian/librarian)
- Robert Terry Stuart Sr. (insurance)
- Nora Amaryllis Talbot (educator)

==== 1957 (50th anniversary of Oklahoma) ====
- Carl Albert (speaker of the House)
- Robert H. Bayley (physician)
- Stanley Carlisle Draper (civic leader)
- Te Ata (historian/storyteller)
- Erle P. Halliburton (oilman)
- Roy Harris (music composer)
- James A. Rinehart (attorney/public servant)
- Anna T. Scruggs (mental health)
- Roy J. Turner (governor)

==== 1958 ====
- Boots Adams (oilman)
- Willis Maxson Chambers (educator)
- Alice Marriott (historian)
- Dean Anderson McGee (oilman)
- Lucile Page (civic leader)
- John Wesley Raley (educator)
- Oliver S. Willham (educator)

==== 1959 ====
- C.R. Anthony (entrepreneur)
- Della Duncan Brown (civic leader)
- Harold Harvey Herbert (educator)
- H.C. Jones (entrepreneur)
- Alfred P. Murrah (jurist)
- Bess Truitt (poet laureate)
- Natalie Overall Warren (civic leader)
- Mac Q. Williamson (public servant)

=== 1960s ===
==== 1960 ====
- Stephen Sanders Chandler Jr. (jurist)
- Ruth Wilson Hurley (civic leader)
- Richard Kelvin Lane (business executive)
- Joe C. Scott (educator/rancher)
- Ned Shepler (publisher)
- Joseph Richard Taylor (artist)

==== 1961 ====
- Virgil Browne (entrepreneur)
- Anna Lee Brosius Korn (founder/civic leader)
- Joseph White McBride (publisher)
- Mike Monroney (U.S. senator)
- John Rogers (attorney)
- Fred Earl Tarman (publisher)
- William K. Warren Sr. (oilman)

==== 1962 ====
- Jennie Dahlgren (public servant)
- J. Howard Edmondson (public servant)
- John Elson Kirkpatrick (philanthropist)
- J.B. Perky (vocational agriculture)
- William Angie Smith (religious leader)

==== 1963 ====
- W.P. Atkinson (publisher/civic leader)
- Orel Busby (jurist)
- Gordon Cooper (aerospace)
- Ben Graf Henneke (educator)
- Herschel Hobbs (religious leader)
- Carol Daube Sutton (civic leader)
- Bud Wilkinson (coach)

==== 1964 ====
- Merle Newby Buttram (civic leader)
- Harvey Pettit Everest (entrepreneur)
- Van Heflin (actor)
- Mickey Mantle (baseball)
- Tessie Mobley (opera singer)
- Clarence H. Wright (business executive)

==== 1965 ====
- Page Belcher (U.S. congressman)
- T. Jack Foster (real estate)
- Henry Iba (coach)
- Jacob Johnson (educator)
- Fred Jones (entrepreneur)
- Mabelle Kennedy (civic leader)

==== 1966 ====
- Anita Bryant (entertainer)
- W. W. Keeler (oilman)
- Donald S. Kennedy (business executive)
- Edwin W. Parker (religious leader)
- William Thomas Payne (oilman)
- Lloyd E. Rader Sr. (public servant)

==== 1967 ====
- Henry Bass (business executive)
- Leta McFarlin Chapman (civic leader)
- Hicks Epton (attorney)
- Malcom E. Phelps (physician)
- Harve Milt Phillips (publisher)
- George Miksch Sutton (ornithologist)
- James E. Webb (NASA administrator)
- Raymond A. Young (entrepreneur)

==== 1968 ====
- Grace Steele Woodward (historian)
- Hal L. Muldrow (military)
- Augusta Metcalfe (artist)
- Jenkin Lloyd Jones Sr. (publisher)
- Floyd Jackson (jurist)
- Jake L. Hamon Jr. (oilman)
- W.D. Finney (banker)
- Hayden Donahue (mental health)

==== 1969 ====
- George H. Shirk (historian)
- Dannie Bea James Hightower (civic leader)
- Morton R. Harrison (public servant)
- William T. Gossett (attorney)
- Mex Frates (civic leader)
- Frederick Alvin Daugherty (jurist, military)
- Jack Conn (banker)

=== 1970s ===
==== 1970 ====
- Edna Hoffman Bowman (civic leader)
- Raymond D. Gary (governor)
- Joseph A. LaFortune (oilman)
- Ward S. Merrick (oilman)
- Maurice H. Merrill (educator)
- Don Horatio O'Donoghue (orthopedic surgeon)
- Willard Stone (artist)

==== 1971 ====
- John McClain Young (business executive)
- H. Merle Woods (publisher)
- Pauline McFarlin Walter (civic leader)
- Tom Steed (congressman)
- Jens Rud Nielsen (physician)
- Ernest L. Massad (military general)
- Sylvan N. Goldman (entrepreneur)
- Mildred M. Andrews Boggess (organist, educator)
- Jack H. Abernathy (oilman)

==== 1972 ====
- Oral Roberts (religious leader)
- Maria Tallchief Paschen (ballerina)
- Robert B. Kamm (educator)
- Christine W. Hitch (civic leader)
- B.D. "Babe" Eddie (entrepreneur)
- Milo M. Brisco (oilman)
- George S. Benson (missionary, activist)

==== 1973 ====
- Betty Anthony Zahn (civic leader)
- Eugene L. Swearingen (educator)
- Thomas P. Stafford (astronaut)
- Paul Miller (journalist)
- John Houchin (oilman)
- Robert A. Hefner, Jr. (oilman, mayor)
- Guy Fraser Harrison (symphony conductor)
- Frances Rosser Brown (civic leader)

==== 1974 ====
- Kathleen Westby (civic leader)
- Cedomir "Cheddy" M. Sliepcevich (engineer)
- Joseph B. Saunders (oilman)
- Robinson Risner (military general)
- Samuel "Sam" R. Noble (oilman)
- Edward L. Gaylord (entrepreneur)
- William H. Bell (attorney)
- Armais Arutunoff (inventor, entrepreneur)

==== 1975 ====
- Dolphus Whitten, Jr. (educator)
- Holmes Tuttle (entrepreneur)
- Carl E. Reistle, Jr. (oilman)
- Lela J. O'Toole (educator)
- T. Howard McCasland (oilman)
- Robert J. Lafortune (oilman)
- Elanor Blake Kirkpatrick (civic leader)
- Alfred E. Aaronson (oilman)

==== 1976 ====
- Jim Shoulders (rodeo)
- Kent Ruth (historian)
- Merle Montgomery (business Executive, educator, musician)
- J.W. McClean (banker)
- James G. Harlow (educator)
- Jerrie Cobb (aviator, astronaut)
- Henry Bellmon (governor, military, U.S. senator)
- Harriet Barclay (botanist)

==== 1977 ====
- Ira C. Eaker (military general)
- Bryce N. Harlow (public servant, military, presidential advisor)
- Earnest Hoberecht (journalist)
- Ross H. Miller (physician)
- Inez Scott Lunsford Silberg (educator, singer)
- Earl Sneed (banker)
- John H. Williams (entrepreneur, businessman)
- Charles Banks Wilson (artist)

==== 1978 ====
- Dewey Follett Bartlett (governor, U.S. senator)
- Woodrow Wilson Crumbo (artist)
- Mary Johnston Head Evans (civic leader)
- John Hope Franklin (historian, author)
- Walter Hugo Helmerich (oilman)
- Mary Eddy Neal Jones (civic leader)
- James Jackson Kilpatrick, Jr. (journalist, author)
- Morrison G. Tucker (banker)

==== 1979 ====
- Christine Holland Anthony (civic leader)
- John H. Burns (diplomat)
- Henry C. Hitch, Jr. (rancher)
- Moscelyne Larkin Jasinski (ballerina)
- J. C. Kennedy (banker)
- P. C. Lauinger (publisher)
- James C. Leake, Sr. (entrepreneur)
- Dale L. Robertson (actor, rancher)

=== 1980s ===
==== 1980 ====
- Marian Briscoe DeVore (civic leader)
- Owen Garriott (astronaut)
- Cluff E. Hopla (zoologist)
- Patience Latting (public servant)
- W. (Bill) P. Longmire, Jr. (physician)
- William (Bill) F. Martin (oilman)
- Myron (Mike) A. Wright (oilman)

=== 2020s ===
==== 2020 ====
- Calvin J. Anthony (retired)
- Gary Batton (chief, Choctaw Nation of Oklahoma)
- Martha Burger (civic leader)
- Charles Dennis 'Denny' Cresap (retired)
- Terry Stuart Forst (general manager, Stuart Family Ranch)
- Stephen M. Prescott (physician-scientist)
- Francis Rooney (former chief executive officer, Manhattan Construction, Inc.)
- John W. Smith (head coach, Oklahoma State University wrestling program)

==== 2021 ====
- Roscoe Dunjee (publisher)†
- Stanley L. Evans (assistant dean, University of Oklahoma College of Law)
- Scott Hendricks (record producer)
- Hannibal B. Johnson (author/attorney/consultant)
- Yvonne Kauger (justice)
- Paula A. Marshall (CEO of a food manufacturing facility)
- Harvey Pratt (law enforcement/artist)
- Jim Stovall (entrepreneur/author)

==== 2022 ====
- Sue Ann Arnall (attorney)
- Bob Blackburn (historian/author)
- Chet Cadieux (chairman & CEO of QuikTrip Corporation)
- Patty Gasso (head softball coach, University of Oklahoma)
- F. Roger Hardesty (entrepreneur)
- Joy Harjo (writer/musician)
- Pamela McCauley (engineer/educator)
- Leon Russell (musician/songwriter)†

==== 2023 ====
- Dwight E. Adams (FBI special agent/educator)
- John Barrett Jr. (chairman of the Citizen Potawatomi Nation)
- Judith A. James (physician/scientist)
- Bill Lance (secretary of state for the Chickasaw Nation)
- J Mays (industrial and automotive designer)
- Madeline Manning (Olympian/speaker/singer)
- Barry Pollard (neurosurgeon)
- Mary Golda Ross (engineer)†

==== 2024 ====
- Anita Golden Arnold (historian/author)
- Greg Burns (visual artist)
- Benton C. Clark III (space scientist)
- Anne Morris Greenwood (philanthropist)
- Drew Edmondson (attorney)
- Tim DuBois (songwriter, music executive)
- Amber Valletta (model, actress, entrepreneur, activist)

==== 2025 ====
- Ronnie Dunn (songwriter, artist)
- Eddy Gibbs (manufacturer, philanthropist, entrepreneur)
- Taylor Hanson (musician, entrepreneur)
- Mautra Staley Jones (college president)
- Bert Mackie (banker, security national bank)
- Michael A. Mares (museum director)
- Sam Presti (executive vice president & general manager for the Oklahoma City Thunder)

==== 2026 ====
- Bruce T. Benbrook (banker)
- Dwight W. Birdwell (attorney)
- Joseph R. Castiglione (sports business professional)
- Sherri Coale (educator, coach, author, and speaker)
- Ann Felton Gilliland (nonprofit chair and CEO)
- Ann W. Hargis (philanthropist)
- Mary F. McCormick (former Principal Chief of Sac and Fox Nation)
- Ross O. Swimmer (tribal leader)
