= Robert A. Hefner Mansion =

Coordinates: 35.483844°N 97.516200°W

The Robert A. Hefner Mansion is a historic residence in Oklahoma City, Oklahoma. Built in 1917, from 1927 it was home to lawyer, Oklahoma City mayor, and Oklahoma Supreme Court justice Robert A. Hefner. It is located at 201 Northwest Fourteenth Street. It features on a postcard. The building was home to Oklahoma Historical Association and its Hall of Fame until 2007. The property is now owned by St. Luke's Methodist Church.

The Greek Revival style mansion, with its eclectic landscape, was initially designed by architect Albert F. Stewart in 1917 for the F.L. Mulkey family. (Note: The mansion contains 10,000 square feet (930 m^{2}) of living space and is the only home on a city block.) Ten years later, Robert A. Hefner and his family acquired the house and moved in. Hefner (1874-1971) was already a noted attorney, who was appointed to one 6-year term (1926-1932) on the Oklahoma Supreme Court. In 1939, Hefner was elected mayor of Oklahoma City serving until 1947. He was the first person elected to multi-year terms as mayor of Oklahoma City.

In 1970, the Hefners donated their mansion to the Oklahoma Historical Association (OHA), which wanted to use it as the OHA headquarters and home to the Oklahoma Hall of Fame. The OHA made some minor renovations, but preserved the historical and architectural integrity of the building and grounds. OHA remained here until 2006, when it moved to the former Mid-Continent Life Building. OHA then put the Hefner Mansion on the market for sale.

St. Luke's United Methodist Church bought the mansion and grounds from OHA in 2007, announcing its intention to include the physical assets into the mission of the church. The first action was to make the entire block on which the house and grounds sat part of the existing St. Luke's campus. Then the church initiated major renovations, even before formally moving in. (Note: A church spokesman said that many renovations were needed to bring the house into compliance with the Americans with Disabilities Act before the church could use it.) The ground floor was converted into meeting rooms and office space, while retaining much of the original architectural integrity. The second and third floors were divided into offices for church staff. An industrial-type kitchen was installed specifically to support the church's Mobile Meals program.

The mansion also contains a chapel donated by the Hefner family. It remains a sacred space that is used for prayer, meditation and baptisms. (Note: Many old Southern mansions contained such a private family chapel.)

The mansion grounds have become a downtown sanctuary for reflection, meditation, and celebration. A brick-paved courtyard has been added, so that members and friends may donate bricks to commemorate others. The "Christmas Box Angel," originally donated by Richard Paul Evans to the Oklahoma Red Cross in memory of the children who died in the 1995 Alfred P. Murrah Federal Building bombing has been relocated to this area. A special worship service is held here every December, open to anyone who has lost a loved one during the previous year and seeking a renewal of hope during the Christmas season.

A building known as the "Carriage House," which formerly served as a garage, storage and gardening work area, was razed in 2014 and replaced with a new structure devoted to offices.
