= Hillerman =

Hillerman is a surname. Notable people with the surname include:

- Abbie B. Rich Hillerman (1856–1945), American suffragette and prohibitionist
- Anne Hillerman (born 1949), American journalist and author
- John Hillerman (1932–2017), American character actor
- Tony Hillerman (1925–2008), American author
