= R. R. Sneed =

American politician

Richard R. Sneed
- Sneed in 1905
- Born: November 21, 1875; Jackson, Tennessee, U.S.
- Died: June 14, 1947 (aged 71); Jackson, Tennessee, U.S.
- Education: Union University
- Political party: Democratic Party
- Spouse: Rebecca Perkins
- Parent(s): Richard A. Sneed; Annie R. Bullock

R. R. Sneed (November 21, 1875 - June 14, 1947) was an American politician. He served as the Tennessee Secretary of State from 1913 to 1917.

== Early life ==
Richard Reynolds Sneed was born on November 21, 1875, in Jackson, Tennessee. His father, Colonel Richard A. Sneed, was a Confederate veteran who co-founded the Ku Klux Klan chapter of Madison County after the war and later served as the Oklahoma Secretary of State and the Oklahoma State Treasurer. His mother was Annie R. Bullock. His maternal uncle, Ernest L. Bullock, was a judge.

Sneed grew up in Oklahoma, and he was educated in Texas: first in Fort Worth and then Gainesville. He graduated from Union University in 1899, where he studied in the law department.

== Career ==
Sneed began his career as a lawyer by working for his uncle Bullock in 1898, and he worked as a lawyer in Jackson. Sneed served as a member of the Tennessee House of Representatives from 1905 to 1907 as a Democrat representing Madison County. From 1913 to 1917, he was the Tennessee Secretary of State.

Sneed resumed legal practise in Oklahoma City, Oklahoma. Later, he co-founded a legal firm in Jackson with his uncle one of his cousins, Thomas McCorry, known as Bullock, McCorry & Sneed. From 1928 to 1947, Sneed was a clerk and master of the chancery court of Madison County.

According to The Jackson Sun, he was "one of the best known public men in Tennessee."

== Personal life and death ==
Sneed married Rebecca Perkins. They had a daughter. Sneed was a Methodist. He was a member of the Jackson Lodge of Elks, No. 192.

Sneed died on June 14, 1947, in Jackson, Tennessee. He was buried at the Hollywood Cemetery in Jackson. His widow died in 1961.

Political offices
| Preceded by Hallum W. Goodloe | Secretary of State of Tennessee; 1913–1917 | Succeeded by Ike B. Stevens |
