= Benjamin F. Harrison =

Native American politician

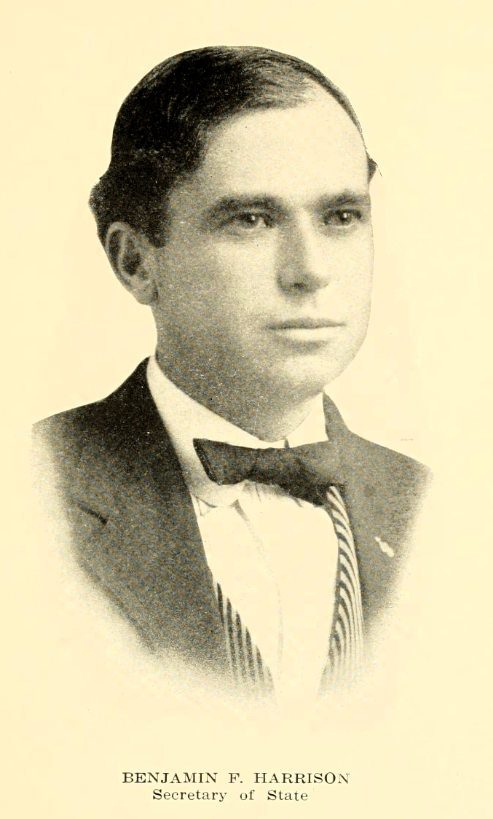
- Harrison in 1912

3rd Oklahoma Secretary of State
- In office January 9, 1911 – January 2, 1915
- Governor: Lee Cruce
- Preceded by: Thomas Smith
- Succeeded by: H. G. Oliver

Speaker Pro Tempore of the Oklahoma House of Representatives
- In office November 16, 1908 – November 16, 1910
- Preceded by: Albert H. Ellis
- Succeeded by: N. J. Johnson

Member of the Oklahoma House of Representatives
- In office November 16, 1907 – November 16, 1910
- Preceded by: Position established
- Succeeded by: William A. Hammond
- Constituency: Pittsburg County and Hughes County

Personal details
- Born: January 12, 1875 Antlers, Choctaw Nation, Indian Territory
- Died: March 23, 1936 (aged 61) Oklahoma, U.S.
- Political party: Democratic Party

Benjamin F. Harrison was a Native American politician in the U.S. state of Oklahoma. A member of the Democratic Party, he served for one term in the House before being elected Oklahoma's 3rd Secretary of State, where he would serve between January 1911 and January 1915.

== Biography ==
Benjamin F. Harrison was born in Antlers, Choctaw Nation on January 12, 1875, to a Chickasaw mother and a Choctaw father. He attended Wapanucka Institute in the Chickasaw Nation and later graduated from Trinity College of Arts and Sciences. After graduation he returned to Indian Territory to work as a schoolteacher before working for the Dawes Commission. He was a member of the Oklahoma Constitutional Convention. He represented Pittsburg County and Hughes County in the 1st and 2nd Oklahoma Legislatures. He was the speaker pro tem of the House during 2nd legislature. Harrison ran in the 1910 Oklahoma elections for Oklahoma Secretary of State, defeating Leo Meyer in the Democratic primary. He went on to win the general election with 49.3% of the vote. He was sworn in as the 3rd Oklahoma Secretary of State on January 9, 1911. He resigned from office sometime before January 2, 1915.

== Electoral history ==
Oklahoma Secretary of State Democratic primary (August 2, 1910)
| Party | Candidate | Votes | % |
|---|---|---|---|
| Democratic | Ben F. Harrison | 56,005 | 55.0% |
| Democratic | Leo Meyer | 45,874 | 45.0% |
| Turnout | | 101,879 | |

1910 Oklahoma Secretary of State election
| Party | Candidate | Votes | % | ±% |
|---|---|---|---|---|
| Democratic | Ben F. Harrison | 117,790 | 49.3% | −5.5% |
| Republican | Donald R. Fraser | 94,180 | 39.4% | −1.6% |
| Socialist | J.V. Kolachny | 23,581 | 9.8% | +5.9% |
| Prohibition | H.E. Strickler | 2,931 | 1.2% | New |
| Democratic hold | | Swing | | |

Party political offices
| Preceded by William Macklin Cross | Democratic nominee for Oklahoma Secretary of State; 1910 | Succeeded by Joseph Lucien Lyon |
