= Joseph Lucien Lyon =

American politician (?-1936)

5th Oklahoma Secretary of State
- In office January 1915 – January 1919
- Governor: Robert L. Williams
- Preceded by: H. G. Oliver
- Succeeded by: Joe Morris

Personal details
- Born: Lucas, Kentucky, United States
- Died: September 6, 1936 (aged 60) Oklahoma City, Oklahoma, United States
- Party: Democratic Party

Joseph Lucien Lyon is an American politician who served as the 5th Oklahoma Secretary of State from 1915 to 1919.

== Biography ==
Joseph Lucien Lyon moved to Oklahoma City, Oklahoma Territory, from Lucas, Kentucky in 1899. He ran for Oklahoma Secretary of State in 1914, defeating four other candidates in the Democratic Party primary before winning the general election. He served in office from 1915 to 1919. (Note: Some later sources erroneously refer to him as "S. L. Lyon," but his obituaries confirm he was named Joseph.)

He died on September 6, 1936, at his home in Oklahoma City.
