= Thomas Smith (Oklahoma politician) =

American politician

2nd Oklahoma Secretary of State
- In office August 6, 1910 – January 9, 1911
- Governor: Charles Haskell
- Preceded by: William Macklin Cross
- Succeeded by: Ben F. Harrison

Personal details
- Political party: Democratic Party

Thomas B. Smith was an American politician and member of the Democratic Party who served as the 2nd Oklahoma Secretary of State from August 6, 1910, until January 9, 1911.
