= John Barrett Jr. =

Citizen Potawatomi Nation politician

Citizen Potawatomi Nation Chairman
- Incumbent
- Assumed office 1985
- Preceded by: Leon Bruno

Citizen Potawatomi Nation Vice-Chairman
- In office 1975–1977

Personal details
- Born: 1944; Shawnee, Oklahoma
- Citizenship: American; Citizen Potawatomi Nation
- Education: Princeton University; University of Oklahoma; Oklahoma City University (B.S.)

John Barrett Jr. is a Citizen Potawatomi Nation politician who has served as the Citizen Potawatomi Nation chairman since 1985. He previously served as the vice-chairman between 1975 and 1977.

== Early life and education ==
John Barrett Jr. was born in 1944 to John Adams Barrett Sr. (November 16, 1923 – June 28, 2004) and Dorie Seikel in Shawnee, Oklahoma. His father served in World War II and his mother was Potawatomi from the Peltier and Boursaw families. He attended tribal meetings as a child with his family and worked on oil rigs owned by his family's Barrett Drilling Company. He graduated from Shawnee High School in 1962 and spent three years at Princeton University before transferring to the University of Oklahoma. He transferred again, this time to Oklahoma City University where he graduated with a bachelor's degree in business. After graduating, he worked as a traveling salesman for the United States Plywood Corporation. He claims to have been in Memphis, Tennessee during the assassination of Martin Luther King Jr. and that "our warehouse was right within sight of where he got shot."

== Political career ==
In 1975, Barrett was elected as the vice-chairman of the Citizen Potawatomi Nation and served two terms. (Note: Elected office in the Citizen Potawatomi Nation is for a one year term.) In 1984, he helped write a new Citizen Potawatomi Nation constitution that was approved in 1985. That same year he was elected the Chairman of the Citizen Potawatomi Nation. He again led constitutional reform efforts in the nation in 2007. He was inducted into the Oklahoma Hall of Fame in 2023.
