= William Macklin Cross =

American politician (1847–1910)

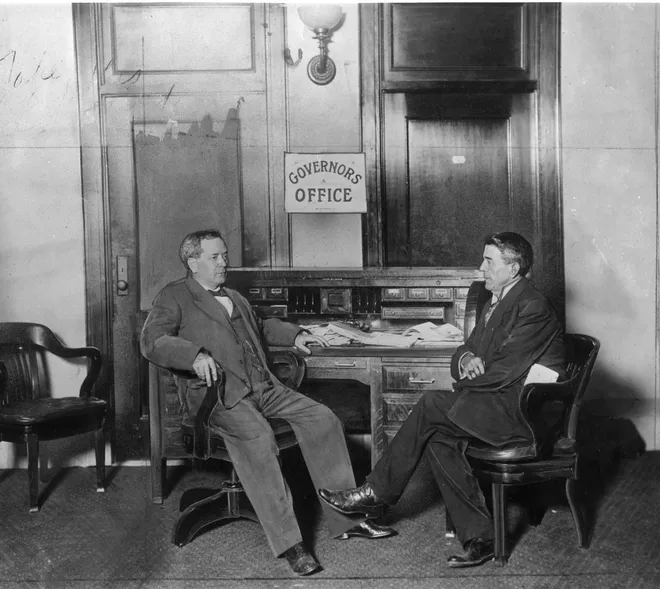
- Charles Haskell (left) and William Macklin Cross (right) in 1910

1st Oklahoma Secretary of State
- In office November 16, 1907 – August 3, 1910
- Governor: Charles N. Haskell
- Preceded by: Position established
- Succeeded by: Thomas Smith

Personal details
- Born: July 4, 1847 Purdy, Tennessee
- Died: August 3, 1910 (aged 63)
- Party: Democratic Party

William Macklin Cross (July 4, 1847 – August 3, 1910) was an American politician who served as the first Oklahoma Secretary of State from November 16, 1907, to August 3, 1910.

== Early life and military career ==
William Macklin Cross born on July 4, 1847, in Purdy, Tennessee. At fourteen he joined Confederate States Army, serving in the 154th Tennessee Infantry Regiment as a drummer in Company K. He fought alongside his father at the Battle of Shiloh where his father was killed and he was captured. After a prisoner of war exchange, Cross returned to service under Gen. Joseph E. Johnston. After the war he attended Kentucky University in Lexington, but dropped out after a year due to being unable to afford tuition. He eventually became a travelling salesman and moved to Oklahoma.

== Political career ==
He was an unsuccessfully candidate for Oklahoma Territory's at-large congressional district in 1902. In 1907 he was elected as the first Oklahoma Secretary of State. In 1909, he refused to accept a petition for a state question to allow women to vote from Kate Himrod Biggers because she was not a registered voter. J. Luther Langston and James B. A. Robertson later submitted the petition for her, which Cross accepted. He died in office on August 3, 1910, after winning the 1910 Democratic primary for Oklahoma State Auditor. After his death, his body lied in state at the Guthrie Masonic Temple draped in a Confederate flag. His eulogy was given by newspaperman and former territorial legislator Frank Hilton Greer.

== Electoral history ==
1907 Oklahoma Secretary of State election
Party	Candidate	Votes	%	±%
Democratic	William Macklin Cross	133,504	54.8	New
Republican	Thomas M. Robnett	100,159	41.1	New
Socialist	J.G. Watrus	9,601	3.9	New
Democratic gain from		Swing	N/A	

Oklahoma State Auditor Democratic primary (August 2, 1910)
Party	Candidate	Votes	%
Democratic	William Macklin Cross	59,018	54.9%
Democratic	H. S. Blair	18,332	17.1%
Democratic	H.A. Tucker	15,499	14.5%
Democratic	W.F. Gilmer	14,540	13.5%
Turnout		107,389	

Party political offices
First	Democratic nominee for Oklahoma Secretary of State; 1907	Succeeded by Benjamin F. Harrison
