= Judith A. James =

American rheumatologist

- Born: August 8, 1967 (age 59); Pond Creek, Oklahoma
- Spouse: Glen Wood
- Children: 1

Academic background
- Education: BS, Oklahoma Baptist University; MA, PhD, University of Oklahoma College of Medicine
- Thesis: Sequential fine specificity of Sm and nRNP associated proteins (1993)

Judith Ann James (born August 8, 1967) is an American rheumatologist. She first came to Oklahoma Medical Research Foundation (OMRF) as a Sir Alexander Fleming Scholar in the summer of 1988, and then joined the foundation’s scientific staff in 1994.

== Early life and education ==
James was born on August 8, 1967, in Pond Creek, Oklahoma to a serial entrepreneur mother and wheat farmer father. While attending Pond Creek-Hunter High School, James convinced her science teacher to create a physiology and anatomy class. Upon graduating as valedictorian, James attended Oklahoma Baptist University (OBU) on a full scholarship. During her undergraduate studies, James applied three times for the Sir Alexander Fleming Scholar Program before finally being accepted in 1988. She had been rejected twice due to her lack of research experience so she collaborated with an Oklahoma State University researcher to help with an investigation into possible health benefits of tarantulatoxin. James subsequently graduated from OBU with a Bachelor of Science degree in chemistry with minors in math and music and enrolled at the University of Oklahoma College of Medicine (OU) for her medical degree and a doctorate in microbiology and immunology. She was a member of the inaugural class of OU‘s MD and Ph.D. program. During her medical internship, she became interested in lupus and chose a different career from paediatrics.

== Career ==
Upon completing her residency and fellowship, James joined the Oklahoma Medical Research Foundation (OMRF) as a member of the foundation's Arthritis and Immunology Research Program, where she continued her investigative studies in systemic lupus erythematosus. In 1997, she received the Merrick Junior Scientist Award from the Oklahoma Medical Research Foundation for her work. While serving in this role, James discovered a strong association between Epstein-Barr virus and lupus in children. She later found that lupus patients obtained autoantibodies which are typically present in the blood years before the onset of the disease, allowing scientists and doctors to predict early infection. James was subsequently appointed the Lou Kerr Chair for Biomedical Research in 2004 and focused on understanding systemic rheumatic diseases such as systemic lupus erythematosus, scleroderma, and granulomatosis with polyangiitis.

In 2007, James was presented with the Edmund L. Dubois Memorial Achievement Award for her work on Lupus. She was later awarded the Edward L. and Thelma Gaylord Prize for Scientific Achievement from The Oklahoma Medical Research Foundation for her groundbreaking work in researching diseases of the immune system. As a result of her scientific research, James was elected to sit on the National Institute of Arthritis and Musculoskeletal and Skin Diseases' Advisory Council.

During the COVID-19 pandemic, James was the recipient of the Stanley J. Korsmeyer Award from the American Society for Clinical Investigation for her contributions to understanding the mechanisms of systemic autoimmune diseases. She was also awarded the Evelyn V. Hess, MD, MACP, MACR Award as a "clinical or basic researcher whose lifetime of work has significantly advanced understanding of the pathophysiology, etiology, epidemiology, diagnosis, or treatment of lupus." In May 2023, James was inducted into the Oklahoma Hall of Fame for her contributions to the better health of the state. She has been nominated by Jane Anne Jayroe who called her one of Oklahoma’s most important scientific figures.

== Personal life ==
James and her husband Glen Wood have one daughter together.
