= C. I. Pontius =

University of Tulsa President

- Born: Clarence Isaiah Pontius; December 1, 1892; Butler County, Pennsylvania, US
- Died: December 18, 1981 (aged 89); Tulsa, Oklahoma, US
- Other names: Clarence I. Pontius, Cy Pontius
- Occupations: businessman, banker, university president
- Years active: 1915-1955
- Known for: President of University of Tulsa

Clarence Isaiah Pontius (1892–1981), more commonly identified as Clarence I. Pontius, C. I. Pontius or Cy Pontius, was an Oklahoma businessman, banker and university president. Pontius was born in Butler County, Pennsylvania. (Note: Little information is available about his childhood. Savage's biography of Pontius named both the town of Butler and the census-designated place of Chicora, Pennsylvania as the location of his birth. Savage also wrote that young Pontius had performed college preparatory work at Northfield Mount Hermon School in Gill, Massachusetts.) He then enrolled in Ohio State University, graduating in 1915 with a degree in agriculture. Following graduation, he built a career in business and finance in Ohio. He relocated to Tulsa, Oklahoma, where he continued his career in finance. In 1935, the trustees of Tulsa University, then struggling with financial problems caused by the Great Depression, recruited Pontius to serve as president of the school. He remained in that position until he retired in 1958 and continued to serve as chancellor until 1964.

== Career ==
=== Businessman in Ohio ===
Pontius established himself in Warren, Ohio, where he spent the next 15 years organizing financial companies. For fourteen years, he was the executive officer of the Trumbull National Farm Loan Association, which was connected with the regional Federal Land Bank in Louisville, Kentucky. In 1920, while remaining with Trumbull, he organized Valley City Mortgage and Loan Company, and served as treasurer, manager and president until 1930. (Note: Other Ohio ventures that Pontius participated in included several joint stock land banks, building and loan companies, and insurance companies.)

=== Businessman in Oklahoma ===
During the Texas oil boom, (Note: According to Savage, Pontius later told friends that he had always wanted to "go west." He had also admitted that "...he knew no one in Tulsa before he moved there.") Pontius moved to the then-Oil Capital of the World, Tulsa, in 1930, where he became a successful investment banker. He then organized Public Securities Corporation of Tulsa, becoming its president in 1932.

=== University president in Oklahoma ===
In mid-1935, Tulsa University (TU) expressed their interest in having him become its president, explaining that TU was facing dire financial straits that threatened its very existence and that someone was needed at the helm to put the school on a sound footing.

Pontius served 23 years as president until 1958, then became chancellor until 1963. He is credited with saving the school from bankruptcy and putting it on a sound financial basis, and was the longest-serving president in TU's history. (Note: He served a total of 29 years for both positions)

== Personal and family life ==
Pontius married Ruth Elizabeth Birch of Springfield, Ohio in 1922. She was the daughter of T. Bruce Birch, a professor of philosophy at Wittenberg College in Springfield. The Pontiuses had two children. Pontius died in Tulsa on December 18, 1981, and was buried in Tulsa's Rose Hill Memorial Park.

== Retirement ==
In November 1957, the Board of Trustees established a mandatory retirement age of 70 for administrators and established the office of chancellor, which did not specify a retirement age. (Note: The trustees knew that Pontius would soon hit the new retirement age, but they wanted to retain him to help with activities such as fund- raising and public relations. Promoting him to Chancellor would solve the problem.) He became president emeritus on July 1, 1958. He would remain until 1964.

Tulsa University's growth had been substantial during his presidential administration: between 1935 and 1958, TU's student body had more than quintupled, faculty and staff had grown sixfold and university assets increased more than sevenfold.

== Civic activities in Tulsa ==
Pontius involved himself in many civic activities. He served on the Tulsa Chamber of Commerce board of directors, and was on the board of directors of the Tulsa-based International Petroleum Exposition. He was appointed to the original Oklahoma State Coordinating Board for Higher Education and the committee which created the Board of Regents for Higher Education. He also was vice president of the Oklahoma Industrial College Foundation and on the board Oklahoma Frontiers of Science.

== Awards and honors ==
- Oklahoma City University warded Pontius an honorary Doctor of Laws degree in 1936.
- Oklahoma Governor’s Award for Outstanding Public Service (1942).
- Tulsa’s Man of the Year (1949).
- Admitted to the Oklahoma Hall of Fame (1951)
- TU Awarded Pontius an honorary Doctor of Humanities degree in 1960.

== See also ==
- Northfield Mount Hermon School
- University of Tulsa
