= John Kennedy (Oklahoma politician) =

American politician (born 1946)

24th Secretary of State of Oklahoma
- In office 1991–1994
- Governor: David Walters
- Preceded by: Hannah Atkins
- Succeeded by: Glo Henley

Personal details
- Born: Oklahoma City, Oklahoma
- Party: Democratic

John Kennedy is an American politician. He served as the Secretary of State of Oklahoma in the administration of David Walters from 1991 to 1994. He was also the acting Oklahoma Secretary of Commerce for four months while Secretary of State.

== Early life and education ==
Kennedy grew up in Oklahoma City. He graduated from the Oklahoma City University (BA) and Harvard Kennedy School (MPA).

Political offices
Preceded by Hannah Atkins	Secretary of State of Oklahoma; 1991–1994	Succeeded by Glo Henley
