= Oklahoma Council on Judicial Complaints =

Agency overview
- Headquarters: 1901 North Lincoln Boulevard; Oklahoma City, Oklahoma
- Employees: 2 unclassified
- Annual budget: $500,000
- Ministers responsible: Michael Rogers, Secretary of State; Richard Rose, Chairman
- Agency executive: Taylor Henderson, Director
- Website: https://oklahoma.gov/cojc.html

The Oklahoma Council on Judicial Complaints is an agency of the state of Oklahoma that investigates allegations of judicial misconduct and can recommend a judge be reprimanded by the Oklahoma Supreme Court or recommend the judge's removal from office by the Oklahoma Court on the Judiciary. The council has jurisdiction over all state, municipal and administrative law judges. The council is composed of three members.

== Membership ==
The council consists of three members. Only two members of the council may be members of the Oklahoma Bar Association. One member is appointed by the President pro tempore of the Oklahoma Senate, one member is appointed by the Speaker of the Oklahoma House of Representatives, and the third member is appointed by the President of the Oklahoma Bar Association. No members of the council, during their terms of office, is eligible for appointment to the Oklahoma Judicial Nominating Commission.

The current members of the council are:

- Richard Rose - Chairman
- Angela Ailles Bahm - Vice Chairwoman
- Zack Taylor - Member
