= Hannah Atkins =

American politician (1923–2010)

Secretary of State of Oklahoma
- In office 1987–1991
- Governor: Henry Bellmon
- Preceded by: Jeanette Edmondson
- Succeeded by: John Kennedy

Member of the Oklahoma House of Representatives from the 97th district
- In office 1969–1981
- Preceded by: Jerry Sokolosky
- Succeeded by: Kevin Cox

Personal details
- Born: November 1, 1923 Winston-Salem, North Carolina, U.S.
- Died: June 17, 2010 (aged 86)
- Party: Democratic
- Spouse: Charles N. Atkins
- Children: Edmund Earl; Charles Nathaniel; Valerie Ann

Hannah Diggs Atkins (November 1, 1923 – June 17, 2010) was the member of the Oklahoma House of Representatives for the 97th district from 1968 to 1980, and the first African-American woman elected to the Oklahoma House of Representatives. She was later appointed to the simultaneous positions of Secretary of State of Oklahoma and Secretary of Social Services, establishing her as the highest ranked female in Oklahoma state government until she retired in 1991.

== Early life ==
Hannah Diggs was born on November 1, 1923, in Winston-Salem, North Carolina to James and Mabel (Kennedy) Diggs. Hannah was the fifth of six children born to the family. She and her sisters all obtained a bachelor's degree as well as a master's degree. Edward O. Diggs, her brother, was the first African-American to attend the University of North Carolina Medical School in 1961. Hannah was the first of her sisters to marry and the only one to have children.

She attended segregated public schools in Winston-Salem and graduated as valedictorian at age 15 from Atkins High School. She earned a B.A. degree in French and Biology from St. Augustine College in Raleigh, North Carolina in 1943 and a library science degree from the University of Chicago in 1949. She studied at the School of Law at Oklahoma City University and earned a master's degree in Public Administration from the University of Oklahoma in 1989 when she was 66 years old.

== Marriage and library career ==
Two days before earning her Bachelor of Science Degree in 1943 from St. Augustine's College, Hannah married Charles N. Atkins, a physician. The couple had three children: Edmund Earl, Charles Nathaniel and Valerie Ann.

Atkins became a reference librarian in 1949 at Fisk University in Nashville. In 1950, the couple moved back to Winston-Salem, where she became the librarian at Kimberly Park Elementary. Regarding her beginnings as a librarian, Atkins says: "I was a librarian. I still am a book-aholic. I still collect too many books. I gave away about a thousand of them when I moved here, but we grew up surrounded by books as children, and when my Dad was in general contracting – when he'd return from South Carolina or wherever, he'd always bring us books instead of candy and junk things. He'd bring us books."

In 1953, the Atkins family moved west to Oklahoma. Atkins became a branch librarian for the Oklahoma City Public Library until 1956. In 1962, she became a reference librarian for the Oklahoma State Library. After a year, she worked her way up to chief of general reference and acting law librarian. She became an instructor of law, as well as an instructor of library science, at Oklahoma City University. In 1989, she earned a Master's of Public Administration at the University of Oklahoma.

As a librarian, Atkins served as a voice against both censorship and racism. On the back cover of The Dismissal of Miss Ruth Brown:

The chief conclusion of 'The Dismissal of Miss Ruth Brown' is that Bartlesville was an example of the communities that were willing to deny or ignore public racist practices and to concentrate on censorship and use it as a tool to destroy any person perceived to believe in racial equity. It is a balanced presentation of an important case that has been buried for over forty years. The Dismissal of Miss Ruth Brown will be of interest to the civil rights and civil liberties communities as well as to librarians and historians.

== Politics ==
Atkins is best known as the first African American woman to be elected to the Oklahoma House of Representatives. She served from 1968 until 1980 as the representative from the 97th District. Atkins authored many important bills during her tenure. She fought for health care, child welfare, mental health reform, women's rights and civil rights. She was Chairwoman of the Public and Mental Health Committee. She also served on the House Appropriations and Budget Committee, Commission on Education and Professional Standards Board, and Higher Education.

In 1980, President Jimmy Carter named Atkins to the General Assembly of the 35th Session of the United Nations. She was a member of the Third Committee which concentrated on social and economic issues. Following her assignment at the United Nations she returned to Oklahoma. Between September and December 1982 she served as a consultant to the Oklahoma Corporation Commission. Governor Henry Bellmon selected Atkins as assistant director of the Department of Human Services in January 1983. Her responsibilities included the Division of Aging. She held this post until September 1987. In January 1987, she was selected as the Cabinet Secretary for Social Services. The following September Atkins' added Secretary of State to her duties and served in dual roles in the Cabinet. In addition to the traditional duties of a Secretary of State, she had oversight of the Department of Mental Health, the Department of Corrections, the Pardon and Parole Board and their related boards, councils and committees. She was the highest ranking woman in Oklahoma state government until her retirement in 1991.

Remembering the challenge of becoming the Secretary of State of Oklahoma, Atkins recalled:

Not easy. No, no, no, no, no, no. It wasn't easy. I got hit over the head all the time, you know. First, I was a woman and then I was an African American. They will beat you up on those things. Oklahoma was still a southern attitude. But my daddy told me, 'Don't ever let that stop you. You have your ambition and you go ahead and do what you think you're cut out to do. Don't let any of those things stop you', and I tried to live that way.

== Awards, positions and memberships ==
Throughout her career Hannah Atkins acquired numerous awards and honors, including Theta Sigma Pi Woman of the Year (1968), National Public Citizen (1975) and Hannah Atkins Day at the University of Oklahoma (1978). She was inducted into the Oklahoma Women's Hall of Fame in 1982 and the Oklahoma Afro-American Hall of Fame 1983. She was inducted into the Oklahoma Hall of Fame in 2000. Atkins was a member of Alpha Kappa Alpha sorority and The Links, Inc.

In 1990, Oklahoma State University established an endowed chair in her honor, the Hannah Atkins Endowed Chair in Public Service. In 1998 Atkins received an honorary doctorate from the University of Oklahoma, and, in 2000, an honorary doctorate from Oklahoma State University. Into the 21st century, Atkins continued to serve her community as a member of the Oklahoma Task Force for the Bombing Memorial. Her public papers are archived at Oklahoma State University.

== Awards ==
- Theta Sigma Pi Woman of the Year (1968)
- National Public Citizen of the Year (1975)
- Merit Award, Mother of the Year (1976)
- Hannah Atkins Day, University of Oklahoma (1978)
- Oklahoma ACLU Angie Debo Award (1980)
- Oklahoma Women's Hall of Fame (1982)
- Consultant to the Oklahoma Corporation Commission (1982)
- Outstanding Woman of the Year, Town Club (1983)
- Cabinet Secretary of Oklahoma Social Services (1987–1991)
- Oklahoma Secretary of State (1987–1991)
- M.P.A. University of Oklahoma (1989)
- National Governors Association Award for Distinguished Service to State Government (1990)
- National Conference of Christians and Jews Humanitarian Award (1990)
- RSU Constitution Award (1998)
- Honorary Doctorate from the University of Oklahoma (2000)
- Oklahoma Black Heritage Humanitarian Award

Political offices
Preceded by Jeanette Edmondson	Secretary of State of Oklahoma; 1987–1991	Succeeded by John Kennedy
