= Gaylord-Pickens Oklahoma Heritage Museum =

Museum in Oklahoma City, Oklahoma, US

Coordinates: 35.483621°N 97.526236°W

The Gaylord-Pickens Museum is in Oklahoma City, Oklahoma, United States. It is home to the Oklahoma Hall of Fame and features interactive exhibits relating Oklahoma's history. It is located in the Mid-Continental Life building and includes a theater.

Oklahoma Hall of Fame Gaylord-Pickens Museum in Oklahoma City March 2025
