= H. G. Oliver =

American politician

4th Oklahoma Secretary of State
- In office January 2, 1915 – January 11, 1915
- Appointed by: Lee Cruce
- Governor: Lee Cruce
- Preceded by: Benjamin F. Harrison
- Succeeded by: Joseph Lucien Lyon

Personal details
- Party: Democratic

H. G. Oliver was an American politician who served as the 4th Oklahoma Secretary of State in January 1915.

== Biography ==
H. G. Oliver served as the fourth Oklahoma Secretary of State from January 2 through January 11, 1915. He was a member of the Democratic Party. He was appointed after the resignation of Benjamin F. Harrison during the tenure of Lee Cruce.
