= Josh Cockroft =

American politician

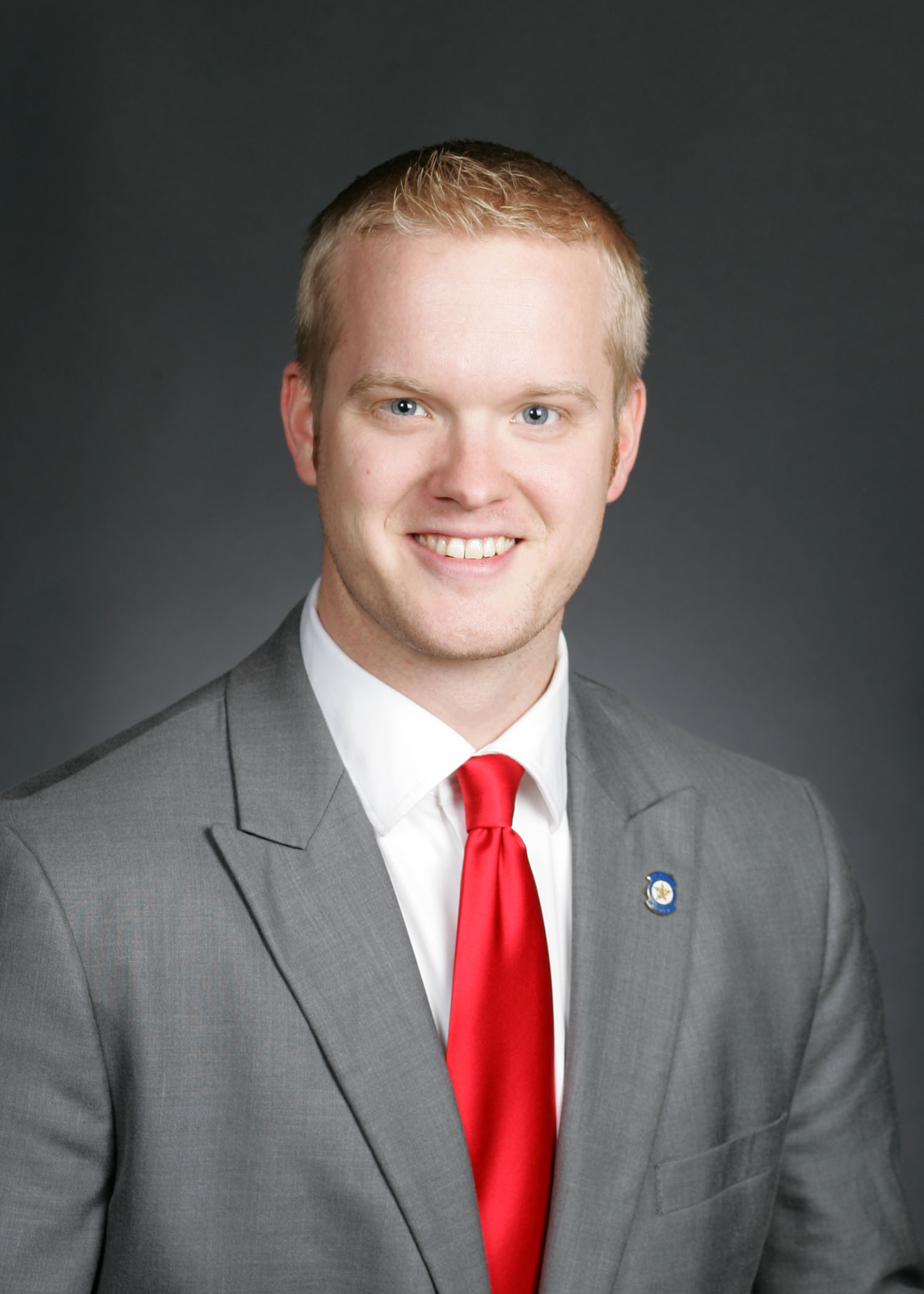
- Official portrait, 2012

Secretary of State of Oklahoma
- In office September 13, 2023 – October 2, 2025
- Governor: Kevin Stitt
- Preceded by: Brian Bingman
- Succeeded by: Benjamin Lepak (acting)

Member of the Oklahoma House of Representatives from the 27th district
- In office November 16, 2010 – November 15, 2018
- Preceded by: Shane Jett
- Succeeded by: Danny Sterling

Personal details
- Born: February 6, 1989 (age 37) Tecumseh, Oklahoma, U.S.
- Party: Republican
- Education: Calvary Chapel Bible College

Josh Cockroft (born February 6, 1989) is an American politician who served as a member of the Oklahoma House of Representatives for the 27th district from 2010 to 2018 and as the Oklahoma Secretary of State from 2023 to 2025.

== Early life and education ==
Cockroft attended Calvary Chapel Bible College.

== Career ==
Cockroft served as a program director for TeenPact Leadership Schools, a Christian program that trains young people to engage in policy and the political process to advance Christian values. He was first elected to the Oklahoma House of Representatives in 2010 at age 20.

In 2013, Cockroft led an effort to defund the Oklahoma Arts Council.

After leaving the Oklahoma House of Representatives, Cockroft led government affairs for the Oklahoma Association of Realtors from 2019 to 2022.

He was the political director of Kevin Stitt's 2022 re-election campaign. In December 2022, he was appointed as the deputy chief of staff of the Governor of Oklahoma. On September 13, 2023 he was appointed Oklahoma Secretary of State by Governor Kevin Stitt.

Political offices
Preceded by Brian Bingman	Secretary of State of Oklahoma; 2023–2025	Succeeded by Benjamin Lepak; Acting
