= Hannibal B. Johnson =

African-American author

- Born: January 27, 1959 (age 67)
- Education: Harvard Law School, University of Arkansas
- Occupations: author; attorney; consultant
- Writing career
- Subject: African-American literature
- Notable work: Black Wall Street: From Riot to Renaissance in Tulsa's Historic Greenwood District (1998)
- Website: Official website

Hannibal B. Johnson (born January 27, 1959) is a writer, educator, and activist who specializes in teaching African-American history.

== Background ==
Hannibal B. Johnson was born on January 27, 1959 in Clarksville, Arkansas. He graduated from Northside Highschool. He is a graduate of the University of Arkansas, and Harvard Law School. He has also taught law at the University of Tulsa College of Law, Oklahoma State University, and the University of Oklahoma.

Johnson is most well known for his efforts in preserving the history of the Greenwood District, also known as Black Wall Street, and his work revolving around the 1921 Tulsa race massacre. In 1998, Black Wall Street: from Riot to Renaissance in Tulsa's Historic Greenwood District. This was followed by the 2021 book Black Wall Street 100: An American City Grapples With Its Historical Racial Trauma. He published 10 Ways We Can Advance Social Justice Without Destroying Each Other in 2024. For his contributions to through literature and activism, Johnson was inducted into the Oklahoma Hall of Fame on November 18, 2021.

Johnson has also served as a commissioner on the Oklahoma Advisory Council to the U.S. Civil Rights Commission and currently serves on the 400 Years of African American History Commission. Johnson has also served on multiple educational committees, including the Tulsa Race Massacre Centennial Commission, and been the curator for the Greenwood Rising Historical Center.
