= John Graves Leeper =

United States politician and businessman

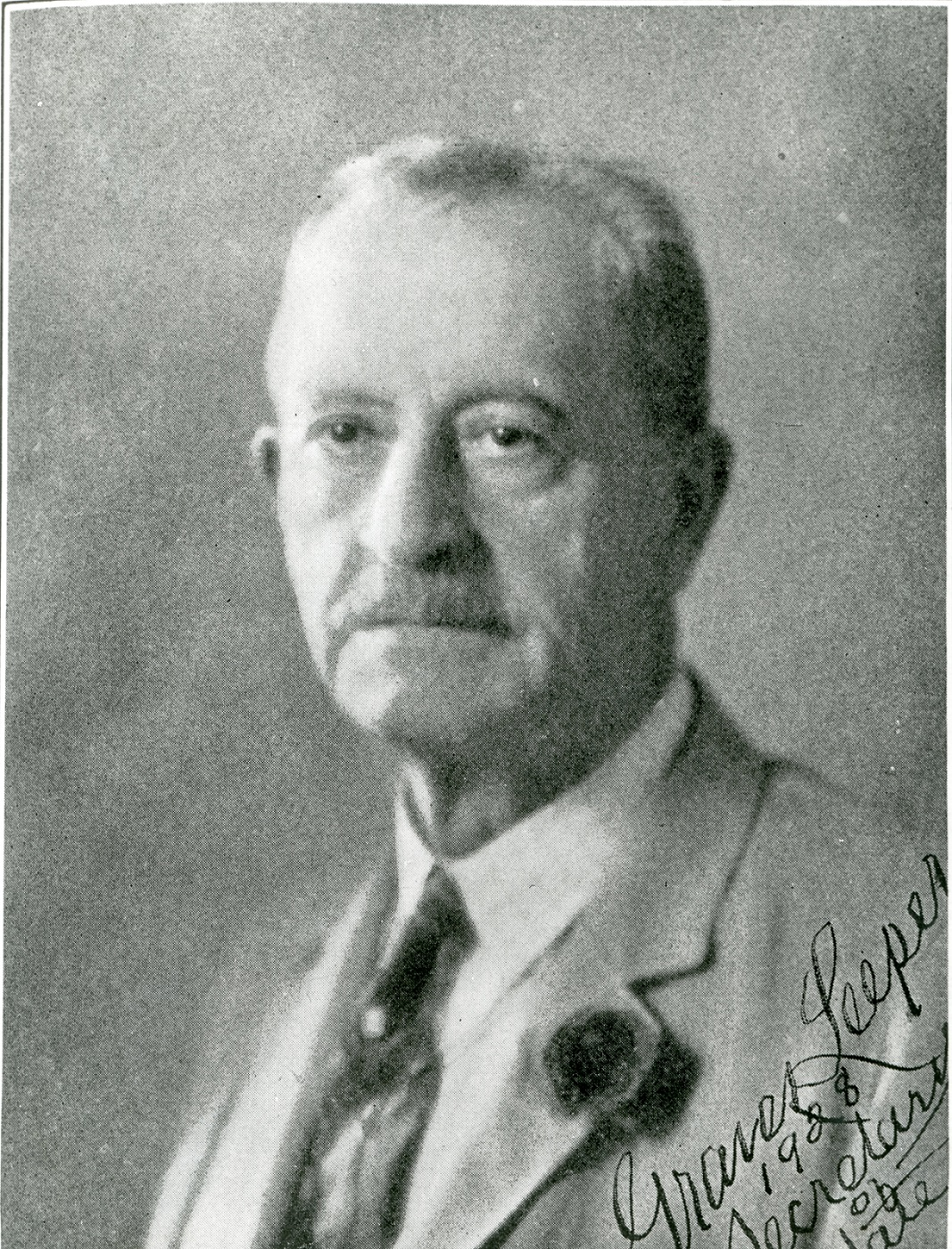
- Leeper in 1928

Oklahoma Secretary of State
- In office 1927–1931
- Governor: Henry S. Johnston; William J. Holloway
- Preceded by: Richard A. Sneed
- Succeeded by: Richard A. Sneed

Personal details
- Born: 1854; Chillicothe, Missouri
- Died: 1931
- Political party: Democratic Party

John Graves Leeper (May 23, 1854 – March 2, 1931) was an American politician and businessman who served as the elected Oklahoma Secretary of State between 1927 and 1931.

== Biography ==
John Graves Leeper was born to James and Elizabeth (Graves) Leeper in Chillicothe, Missouri. He attended Central Methodist University in Fayette, Missouri. In the late 1800s he moved to Texas with his brother J.D. Leeper. The brothers opened lumber mills in Denison, Gainesville, and Bowie as well as in Oklahoma Territory and in Chickasaw Nation, Indian Territory along the Atchison, Topeka and Santa Fe Railway. They eventually expanded into Anadarko near the Chicago, Rock Island and Pacific Railroad. One of his brothers, Cyrus S. Leeper, served as a member of the Oklahoma Constitutional Convention. Eventually, John and J.D. sold their other lumber mills to open a new mill in Oklahoma City. John Leeper was elected in 1926 and served as the Oklahoma Secretary of State between 1927 and 1931. He died shortly after leaving office in 1931.

Party political offices
Preceded by Richard A. Sneed	Democratic nominee for Oklahoma Secretary of State; 1926	Succeeded by Richard A. Sneed
