= Benjamin Lepak =

Oklahoma Secretary of State

Ben Lepak

Secretary of State of Oklahoma
- Incumbent
- Assumed office October 2, 2025; Acting: October 2, 2025 – January 30, 2026
- Governor: Kevin Stitt
- Preceded by: Josh Cockroft

Personal details
- Party: Republican
- Relatives: Mark Lepak (father)
- Education: University of Oklahoma (BBA); University of Notre Dame (JD)

Benjamin M. Lepak is an American attorney who has served as the Oklahoma Secretary of State since his appointment by Governor Kevin Stitt in 2025.

== Biography ==
Benjamin M. Lepak is the son of Oklahoma state representative Mark Lepak. He graduated from the University of Oklahoma with a Bachelor of Business Administration in finance. He later earned a juris doctor from Notre Dame Law School and served as the executive director for the State Chamber Research Foundation.

In 2021, Lepak was arrested for driving under the influence in The Village after he was found asleep in his idling truck with two open beers and a blood alcohol level of 0.11%. He received a one-year deferred sentence.

He was appointed to the Oklahoma Statewide Charter School Board on July 3, 2024, by Oklahoma House Speaker Charles McCall. He resigned on October 18 of that year to serve as general counsel for Governor Kevin Stitt. On October 1, 2025, he was appointed as the interim Oklahoma Secretary of State by Stitt. On January 30, 2026, he was retroactively appointed full Secretary of State, effective since October 2, 2025.

On August 14, 2026, Lepak was arrested for public intoxication at a McDonald's in Edmond. The charges were later dismissed.

Political offices
Preceded by Josh Cockroft	Secretary of State of Oklahoma; 2025–present Acting: 2025–2026	Incumbent
