= Richard A. Sneed =

American Confederate veteran, white supremacist and politician

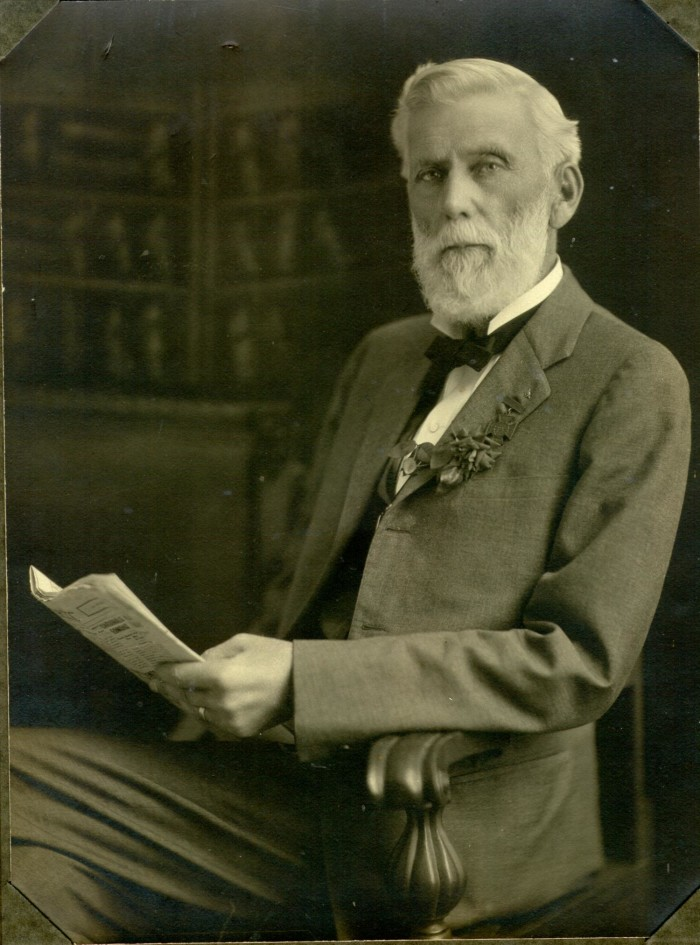
- Sneed in December 1924
- Born: August 28, 1845; Tallahatchie County, Mississippi, U.S.
- Died: March 16, 1936 (aged 90); Lawton, Oklahoma, U.S.
- Children: 3 sons (including R. R. Sneed), 3 daughters
- Parent(s): Albert Sneed; Maria Sneed
- Military career
- Allegiance: Confederate States
- Branch: Confederate States Army
- Service years: 1861–1865
- Rank: Ordnance Sergeant
- Unit: 18th Mississippi Volunteers

Richard Alexander Sneed (August 28, 1845 – March 16, 1936) was an American Confederate veteran, Klansman and politician. After serving in the Confederate States Army during the American Civil War of 1861–1865, he was a co-founder of the Ku Klux Klan chapter in Madison County, Tennessee. A Democrat, he served as the Oklahoma Secretary of State from 1923 to 1927, the Oklahoma State Treasurer from 1927 to 1931, and the Oklahoma Secretary of State again from 1931 to 1935.

== Early life ==
Richard Alexander Sneed was born on August 28, 1845, in Tallahatchie County, Mississippi. His father was Albert Sneed and his mother, Maria; they were from South Carolina.

== Career ==
Sneed joined the Army of Northern Virginia of the Confederate States Army during the American Civil War of 1861-1865. He served under General Jubal Early during the Second Battle of Fredericksburg, where he was wounded. He served under General Robert E. Lee during the Battle of Cold Harbor. He was jailed by the Union Army for two months at the Point Lookout Prison in Maryland from April 14 to June 30 of 1865. After the war, Sneed was a co-founder of the Ku Klux Klan chapter of Madison County, Tennessee. He served as the commander-in-chief of the trans-Mississippi division of the United Confederate Veterans in 1927, and the commander-in-chief of the UCV in 1928.

Sneed was an active member of the Democratic Party. He worked a clerk of the circuit court of Madison County for eight years and deputy clerk of the Tennessee Supreme Court. He ran to become the Tennessee Secretary of State, but he was not elected. He moved to Fort Sill, Oklahoma, in 1895 and worked as a merchant. In 1907, he became recorder of deeds for Comanche County. He was the superintendent of the Chickasaw National Recreation Area from 1914 to 1919. He served as the Oklahoma Secretary of State from 1923 to 1927, the Oklahoma State Treasurer from 1927 to 1931, and the Secretary of State again from 1931 to 1935. He became known as the "grand old man of the Democratic Party" in Oklahoma.

== Personal life and death ==
Sneed married Annie R. Bullock, a native of Jackson, Tennessee, in 1861. They had three sons and three daughters. One of his sons, R. R. Sneed, served as the Tennessee Secretary of State from 1913 to 1917. Sneed was a member of the Methodist Episcopal Church, South, and a Mason.

Sneed died on March 16, 1936, in Lawton, Oklahoma. His funeral was held at the Centenary Methodist Church in Lawton.

Party political offices
Preceded by Joe S. Morris	Democratic nominee for Oklahoma Secretary of State; 1922	Succeeded by John Graves Leeper
Preceded by A. S. J. Shaw	Democratic nominee for Oklahoma State Treasurer; 1926	Succeeded by Ray Weems
Preceded by John Graves Leeper	Democratic nominee for Oklahoma Secretary of State; 1930	Succeeded by Frank C. Carter
