= Robert A. Hefner =

American lawyer

Robert A Hefner

26th Mayor of Oklahoma City
- In office April 11, 1939 – April 8, 1947
- Preceded by: John F Martin
- Succeeded by: Allen Street

Supreme Court of Oklahoma Justice
- In office 1927–1933

Mayor of Ardmore, Oklahoma
- In office 1920–1926

Personal details
- Born: 7 February 1874 Hunt County, Texas
- Died: 1 January 1971 (aged 96)
- Spouse: Eva Johnson
- Children: 3
- Education: North Texas Baptist College; University of Texas
- Profession: Lawyer

Robert Alexander Hefner ("The Judge"), born in Hunt County, Texas, to William Lafayette Hefner and Sarah Jane Masters Hefner, was a lawyer-turned-politician. He served as mayor of Ardmore, Oklahoma, and of Oklahoma City, and as a justice of the Supreme Court of Oklahoma. Hefner was inducted into the Oklahoma Hall of Fame in 1949. Hefner also became notable because of his work in government, especially in Ardmore and later in Oklahoma City.

== Early life ==
Hefner was born on February 7, 1874, in the community of Hefner Chapel four miles (6.4 km) north of Lone Oak, Texas, to William Lafayette Hefner and Sarah Jane Masters Hefner. Growing up in poverty, self-teaching was the only education Hefner could afford. By the age of 21, he had received only nine months of formal education, primarily from books received from a cousin at College Station which he read "at night while I was working on the farm and also when I was out herding sheep".

In 1895, the family had to sell the farm to pay off debts, though the proceeds were insufficient to settle them in full. Just after Hefner's 21st birthday, his father died. Hefner then resolved to work the farm for the following year to clear the family debts. He received $15 per month credited against the debt, and studied at night under a kerosene lamp given to him by his father in the hope of passing the entrance exams for college. In 1896, Hefner passed the examination and gained entrance to North Texas Baptist College at Jacksboro. (Note: According to the Encyclopedia of Oklahoma History and Culture, Hefner attended North Texas Baptist from 1896 until 1898, but then the school declared bankruptcy and closed.) Hefner then taught school before entering the University of Texas Law School in 1899. He paid off the remaining family debts.

Hefner went to college with only the clothes on his back and 35 cents, but found work splitting wood to pay his way. At Jacksboro, he met his wife, Eva Johnson, daughter of a banker. She spoke four languages fluently and became valedictorian of Baylor University in 1905, after gaining her third degree. Hefner and Johnson have 3 children: Robert A. Hefner Jr., William Johnson Hefner, and Margaret Evelyn Hefner. On graduation, he decided he would study law at the University of Texas in Austin, but once again found funding to be a problem. As a result, he worked for a while to save up enough to pay his way and, at the age of 25, he enrolled at the University of Texas and found himself only the second student from the "South Prairie" to do so. In 1902, he graduated near the top of his law class.

== The boom ==
Following his graduation, Hefner headed to Beaumont. It seemed all Texas had heard of the Hamill brothers' gusher which gained Beaumont the title "Oil Capital of the World" for a short time. Hefner decided to specialize in oil and gas law, and to save his money to invest in land that one day might produce. He found a partner, and opened Parker and Hefner. They landed the Southern Pacific Railroad account for their division just seven years after Hefner arrived in Austin. The workload was so great that they had to hire a third partner, renaming the firm Parker, Hefner and Organ.

Throughout his time in Beaumont, Hefner was educating himself further in the oil and gas industry—he became fascinated with geology (or "creekology" as he called it.) It was also during this time that Eva graduated from Baylor University and the two were married on July 18, 1906. They decided to move to Ardmore, Oklahoma, after being involved in a Choctaw court case which dealt specifically with the Dawes Act and Indian mineral conveyances to non-Indians. The account states that Hefner worked for four Indian families, helping them to get their land allotment. He was paid for this work with an annual interest in future profits from the mineral rights, making Hefner quite wealthy. (Note: The property turned out to be part of the highly profitable Healdton oil field in Carter County, Oklahoma.)

Although it is not clear when Hefner actually moved to Ardmore with his family, he had become a resident of Ardmore by January 1, 1908. He founded the Hefner Company, and became an expert in legal issues related to the rapidly-developing oil and gas industry. He immersed himself in community affairs and was made president of the local school board from 1910 to 1920. He also served as city attorney from 1911 to 1913 and city mayor from 1919 to 1927. He represented most of the major oil companies and leading independents including: Humble Oil & Refining Company, Magnolia Petroleum Company (Mobil Oil), Pure Oil Company, Gulf Oil Company, Carter Oil, Skelly Oil, F.W. Merrick, and many others during his first few years in town.

== Creekology ==
Hefner used his law earnings to purchase mineral rights where he thought oil and gas might one day be produced, based upon his "creekology". The theory was that because oil is lighter than water, it had been forced uphill in permeable formations and become trapped in subsurface highs, or domes. Surface water runs downhill, so oil should be traced by observing the course of the rivers and streams. It was assumed that subsurface highs correlated to surface highs. In Oklahoma, this trend was in a northwest-southeast direction from Ardmore and also in a northwest-southeast direction from Duncan. He bought anything he could based upon his trending creekology and, by the time he became Supreme Court Justice in 1927, he had already acquired over 15,000 acres (61 km^{2}) of land and 33,000 acres (130 km^{2}) of mineral rights.

== Mineral conveyance ==
During his time in Ardmore, there was much debate about whether mineral rights could be conveyed separately from fee-simple title–"an opinion held by many noted professors of law and the authors of textbooks on oil-and-gas law".

Another challenge came from a New York investor named W.L. Hernstadt in 1934. He presented the case that production would eventually come from depths greater than 4,000 feet (1,200 m). Hefner supported the theory, but told Hernstadt that it would come long after their time. Hernstadt offered Hefner $10 per net mineral acre for his properties in Carter County and Hefner accepted, a decision that his son would later mock. It was Hefner's grandson, Robert A. Hefner III, who would pioneer gas production at depths approaching 30,000 feet (9,100 m) in the Anadarko Basin of western Oklahoma during the late 1970s.

== Work in government ==
Hefner served two years as city attorney in Ardmore and was elected to the Board of Education as President in 1911 – a position he held until 1918.

Shortly after his move to Ardmore in 1907–1908, Hefner became known as "the Judge". In 1926, he was asked to run for the Supreme Court of Oklahoma's Fifth District. He was elected in 1927, despite widespread corruption within the court. In 1929, three members of the court were impeached for bribery, coercion, misquotation of facts, conspiracy, corruption, interference with criminal proceedings and incompetency; they were all acquitted. In his six years as a Supreme Court Justice, Hefner authored 504 opinions.

Other organizations he ardently supported include:

- the Boy Scouts of America—which he served as a member of the executive council
- the Rotary Club—of which he was President, presiding in 1923 over the National Rotary Club Convention with over 1,500 delegates
- the First Baptist Church—in which he was a deacon
- the Dad's Association at the University of Oklahoma—of which he was President
- the Beaux Arts Ball—of which he was the first King
- the Navy League—of which he was Vice-President in Oklahoma
- the Freemasons—in which he was at the thirty-second degree, as well as being deputy for the Grand Council in the District of Oklahoma.

== Mayor of Oklahoma City and Lake Hefner ==
In 1926, Hefner moved the family to Oklahoma City, where he would become mayor in April 1939. This was the last public office he would hold.

The first of the major hurdles he faced in Oklahoma City was in securing its water supply. On October 18, 1945, the city council voted unanimously to name a reservoir Lake Hefner.

During the World War II, Hefner helped the Navy lead a campaign in Oklahoma City to raise $40 million in war bonds to construct the USS Oklahoma City to replace the USS Oklahoma. The ship was commissioned on December 8, 1942, after one month of fundraising. With the help of E.K. Gaylord, Virgil Brown and H.E. Bailey, he negotiated with Army officials (General Dwight D. Eisenhower, Robert P. Patterson and Admiral Chester W. Nimitz) in an effort to have Washington DC locate a new air depot in Oklahoma City, rather than in any of the other four cities under consideration. In May 1941, the chief of engineers of the United States Army named the base the Midwest Air Depot (now called Tinker Air Force Base.)

Hefner was re-elected in 1942 without any opposition and served out that term before finally stepping down in 1947.

== Bibliography ==
- Hefner, George H (1886). Family Records of the Descendentsw of Henry Hefner 1754–1886.
- "Robert A Hefner Obituary". The Oklahoma Journal. January 23, 1971.
- Hefner, Thomas H. Hefner History and Genealogy (Unpublished).
- McGray, Mary Jane (June 1984). Transylvania Beginnings: A History. Southern Historical Press. ISBN 0893084158.
- Daniel Hefner's War of 1812 muster roll record
- Bounty land application of Elizabeth Hefner, dated 28 April 1852, Cherokee County, Alabama; from the National Archives
- Bounty land application of Elizabeth Hefner, dated 8 January 1856, Hunt County, Texas; from the National Archives
- 1800 federal census of Lincoln County, North Carolina
- 1810-1820-1830-1840 federal censuses of Buncombe County, North Carolina
- 1840 federal census of Rabun County, Georgia
- 1840-1850 federal censuses of Gilmer County, Georgia
- 1850 federal census of Cherokee County, Alabama
- 1860 federal census of Dekalb County, Alabama
- 1870-1880 federal census of Colbert County, Alabama
- 1850 federal census of Titus County, Texas
- 1860-1870-1880 federal censuses of Hunt County, Texas
- Faulk, Odie B; Faulk, Laura E (1975). An Oklahoma Legacy: The Life of Robert A Hefner Jr. Oklahoma City: Oklahoma Heritage Association.
- Travzer, Clifford Earl (1975). The Judge: The Life of Robert A Hefner. Oklahoma City: University of Oklahoma Press.
