= Lucas, Kentucky =

Unincorporated community in Kentucky, United States

Lucas
- Unincorporated community
- Location within the state of Kentucky Lucas (the United States)
- Coordinates: 36°53′30″N 86°2′15″W
- Country: United States
- State: Kentucky
- County: Barren
- Elevation: 751 ft (229 m)
- Time zone: UTC-6 (Central (CST))
  - Summer (DST): UTC-5 (CST)
- ZIP codes: 42156
- GNIS feature ID: 497328

Lucas is an unincorporated community in Barren County, Kentucky, United States. Its post office opened in 1888 and closed in May 1996.
