= Abbie B. Rich Hillerman =

American suffragette and prohibitionist (1856–1945)

- Born: Abbie B. Rich; November 20, 1856; Kokomo, Indiana, US
- Died: July 12, 1945 (aged 88); Tulsa, Oklahoma, US
- Occupations: woman's club president, prohibitionist
- Known for: Advocating for the inclusion of prohibition into the Oklahoma Constitution
- Notable work: History of the Woman's Christian Temperance Union of Indian Territory, Oklahoma Territory, and State of Oklahoma: 1888–1925

Abbie B. Rich Hillerman (November 20, 1856 – July 12, 1945) was an American suffragette and prohibitionist active in Oklahoma Territory and later Oklahoma. She was known as the "Mother of Prohibition" in Oklahoma.

== Early life and family ==
Abbie B. Rich was born into a Quaker family to Lucinda Mendenhall and Phineas Rich near Kokomo, Indiana, on November 20, 1856. She moved to Kansas in 1873 and earned an education degree from Kansas State University. After graduation she began her work in the temperance movement in Seward County, Kansas by serving as the local Woman's Christian Temperance Union president. She married Phineas P. Hillerman, an attorney, in 1879 and they had three children together.

== Oklahoma ==
In 1890, the Hillermans moved to Chandler, Oklahoma Territory. In 1900, she moved to Stillwater and organized the first local Woman's Christian Temperance Union ("WCTU") in the city, serving as its president. In 1900, she served as the territorial WCTU's secretary before serving as the organizations territorial president between 1903 and 1907. During the Oklahoma Constitutional Convention she campaigned for prohibition by delivering over 100 speeches across the twin territories (Oklahoma and Indian Territory). Oklahoma was the only state admitted into the United States with a prohibition section in its state constitution. In 1908, she was the national WCTU representative to the Panama Canal Zone. After statehood she served as the state WCTU vice-president between 1910 and 1911; between 1911 and 1919 she served as the state organization's president. She supported legislation in Oklahoma that regulated cigarettes and raised the age of consent. She was known as the "Mother of Prohibition" in Oklahoma or the "Grand Old Lady of Prohibition."

During World War I she spoke across the nation at the request of Herbert Hoover about food conservation. She declined the position of president of the Oklahoma WCTU in 1920 after winning re-election. In 1925 she wrote History of the Woman's Christian Temperance Union of Indian Territory, Oklahoma Territory, and State of Oklahoma: 1888–1925 and was inducted into the Oklahoma Hall of Fame in 1938. After moving to Tulsa, she served as the city's chapter president from 1932 until her death on July 12, 1945. She's buried at Rose Hill Memorial Park, in Tulsa.
