= Oklahoma Court on the Judiciary =

One of the two highest judicial bodies in Oklahoma

The Oklahoma Court on the Judiciary is one of the two independent courts in the Oklahoma judiciary and has exclusive jurisdiction in adjudicating discipline and hearing cases involving the removal of a judge from office, excluding the Oklahoma Supreme Court, exercising judicial power under the Oklahoma Constitution.

== Purpose ==
The Court of the Judiciary is the court responsible for removing judges from their position if they have committed illegal acts, including gross neglect of duty, corruption in office, habitual drunkenness, commission while in office of any offense involving moral turpitude, gross partiality in office, oppression in office, or other grounds as specified by the state legislature to be removed from office. Also, the Court on the Judiciary may imposed forced retirement if the court finds the judge in question to be mentally or physically unable to perform their job.

== Membership ==
There are nine judges that sit on the appellate division and nine other judges that sit on the trial division. Each judge is appointed by either the Oklahoma Supreme Court, the Oklahoma Bar Association, the Court of Criminal Appeals, or the Secretary of State.

=== Trial Division ===
The Secretary of State of Oklahoma is responsible for selecting eight senior judges, each under the age of 60, with no two judges representing the same district. In the case of equal seniority amongst the district judges, the eldest in years is to serve on the Trial Division. The ninth member of the court is chosen by the Executive Council of the Oklahoma Bar Association from among the bar's active members.

=== Appellate Division ===
As on the Trial Division, the Secretary of State is required to select five senior Judges, under age of 65, with no two of the judges representing one of the nine judicial districts. If any district judge is qualified for both divisions, the selected judge shall serve on the Appellate Division and the next in qualification shall serve on the Trial Division. Two current members of the Oklahoma Supreme Court, chosen from said court, will serve on the court and one current member of the Oklahoma Court of Criminal appeals, also chosen by said court, will serve on the court.

The final member is an active member of the Oklahoma Bar Association chosen by the Executive Council.

=== Leadership ===
Each division of the Court shall select from among its members a presiding judge, and the Courts shall be judge of the qualifications and the disqualification of its own members. Each division shall make and publish its own rules of procedure. Each division shall meet on call of its presiding judge or three of its members, with a majority of the authorized membership of either division of the court constituting a quorum for the exercise of any or the entire jurisdiction of that division, regardless of whether or not vacancies exist in the membership of that division.

The Clerk of the Supreme Court is also the Clerk of the Court on the Judiciary.

=== Judges pro tem ===
In all proceedings before the Court the established rules for disqualification of judges for interest, prejudice or partiality shall apply. No district judge shall sit in a matter in which the respondent is a judge of a court within his district court judicial district. In the event of the disqualification or failure to act of a member of the Court, a judge pro tem to sit in his place shall be named by the authority responsible for appointing them. If he is a district judge, the qualified district judge next in seniority from his Supreme Court judicial district, shall serve as judge pro tem.

== Terms and appointment process ==
Prior to the first day in February of each odd-numbered year, the Chief Justice of the Supreme Court, the Presiding Judge of the Court of Criminal Appeals and the President of the Bar Association shall certify to the Secretary of State the names of the judges who are chosen, respectively, by the said courts and by the Oklahoma Bar Association. The Secretary of State shall determine the district judges who hold membership on the Trial Division and the Appellate Division. Promptly thereafter he shall notify the members of the respective divisions to meet at the State Capitol on a day certain, within thirty days, for purposes of organization and of making or amending rules of procedure.

Members of the Trial and Appellate Courts shall serve until March 1 of the first odd-numbered year after the year in which they are named. If any Judge, during their time on either court, shall attainment the age limit specified by the Oklahoma Constitution shall not terminate their service during their current term.

== Powers ==
In the exercise of its jurisdiction, the court is vested with full judicial power and authority. The court can summon witnesses to appear and testify under oath and to obtain and review evidence; issue judicial and remedial process and writs; provide for discovery procedures in advance of trial; make rules governing procedure; grant full immunity to compel testimony under oath or obtain evidence; and other unspecified powers.

The court has the exclusive jurisdiction to restrict or control or review the orders of the Appellate Division of the Court on the Judiciary and only the Appellate Division has the jurisdiction to restrict, control or review the orders of the Trial Division. Upon the court's request, district courts and the state's high courts can aid in carrying out its procedure and mandates.

== Invoking jurisdiction ==
The jurisdiction of the Trial Division of the court may be invoked by a petition, filed either by the Oklahoma Supreme Court or the chief justice, by the governor, by the state attorney general, or by the Executive Secretary of the Oklahoma Bar Association when directed so to do by a vote of a majority of all members of its Executive Council. A resolution from the Oklahoma House of Representatives may also invoke the court's jurisdiction. The petition shall state the name of the respondent, the grounds upon which his removal from office or compulsory retirement from office is sought, and such other matters as may be specified by the rules of the Trial Division. It shall be subject to amendment by order of either division of the Court.

Immediately upon the filing of the petition, the clerk must notify the presiding officer of the Trial Division, and the respondent named therein, in accordance with the rules of the Trial Division. The presiding judge of the Trial Division shall secure from the Executive Council of the Oklahoma Bar Association a panel of five active members of the Association from which the presiding judge shall designate the prosecutor, and any necessary assistant, to conduct the proceeding against the respondent.

The Trial Division or the presiding judge shall set the matter for hearing, not less than sixty days after notice of the filing of the petition shall have been given the respondent. In all procedural matters not covered by rule of the Trial Division, the provisions of the common law of Oklahoma shall be followed so far as they may be applicable. Pending the determination of the proceedings, the Trial Division in its discretion may suspend the respondent from the exercise of his office. After full hearing, the Trial Division shall render such judgment as the facts may justify. No judgment shall extend further than:

- removal of the respondent from office, with or without disqualification to hold any public office of honor, trust, or profit under this State, or
- to compulsory retirement from office; but such a proceeding, regardless of result, shall not bar or prejudice any other proceeding, civil or criminal, authorized by law.

A judicial officer who is a member of the retirement compensation system prescribed by the Oklahoma Constitution shall receive the retirement compensation to which his term of service entitled him. If he is not qualified for full retirement compensation, he may receive such compensation as the Court may decree, in proportion to time served and in accordance with principles of justice and equity, alike as to amount, commencement of payment, terms of payment, or other relevant conditions or limitations.

== Appeals to Appellate Division ==
From any judgment of the Trial Division, the respondent or the prosecutor may appeal to the Appellate Division, by filing a notice of appeal with the Clerk of the Supreme Court, within ten days after entry of the judgment. The notice shall be served upon the opposite party in the manner prescribed by the rules of the Appellate Division.

The review in the Appellate Division shall be an equity appeal, as to both law and fact. The Appellate Division may affirm, modify or reverse the judgment of the Trial Division, or enter a new judgment, as justice may require. If justice requires, the Appellate Division may hear additional evidence upon the appeal, upon a showing to the satisfaction of the Division that the additional evidence is material and that there were good reasons for failure to present it to the Trial Division.

== Compensation ==
Members of the Court shall serve without compensation, but shall receive the allowance for expense permitted district judges serving outside their districts.

The prosecutors shall receive such fair and just compensation as the respective division of the Court shall award for service before that division.

== See also ==
- Oklahoma Supreme Court
- Rules for the Court on the Judiciary
