= Oklahoma Secretary of State =

Elected political office in Oklahoma

Office of the Secretary of State
- Great Seal of the State of Oklahoma

Agency overview
- Formed: 1907
- Preceding agency: Office of the Territorial Secretary
- Headquarters: Oklahoma State Capitol; Oklahoma City, Oklahoma
- Employees: 36 unclassified
- Annual budget: $2.5 million
- Minister responsible: Benjamin Lepak, Secretary of State
- Website: Office of the Secretary of State

The Secretary of State of the State of Oklahoma is the chief clerical officer of Oklahoma and a member of the Oklahoma Governor's Cabinet. The Secretary of State is the only appointed constitutional member of the executive branch of the Oklahoma state government. The office of Secretary of State was elective from statehood until 1975 when the Constitution was amended and it became an appointive office, running concurrent with the Governor effective in 1979.

Democrat John Rogers served the longest in office, having been elected three times to serve. He only served eight and one-half years, however, when he resigned just six months after taking office for the third time for a four-year term. The shortest term of any Secretary of State was just nine days, served by H. G. Oliver in 1915. He was appointed to fill the job after the resignation of Ben F. Harrison. He left office when newly elected Joseph Lucien Lyon took office on January 15, 1915. Although she was named as "interim" by Governor Mary Fallin and served only one month, Republican Michelle Day is considered the 31st Secretary of State.

== Constitutional requirements ==
The Oklahoma Constitution sets the requirements to hold the office of Secretary of State: the appointee must be a citizen of the State of Oklahoma, at least thirty-one years of age and a resident of the United States for ten years, the same as all high-level executive branch officials.

== Appointment ==
The Governor appoints, with confirmation by the Oklahoma Senate, the Secretary of State to serve a four-year term that runs concurrently with the term of the Governor. As the office is not elective (the only appointive constitutional office in Oklahoma), a Secretary of State may succeed himself/herself in office as many times as the Governor-elect appoints and the state Senate confirms him or her.

== Official duties ==
=== Executive functions ===
The Secretary of State is required by law to attest to the Governor's signature and to file all the official acts of the Governor. Executive orders, appointments and proclamations signed and issued by the Governor are certified and distributed by the Secretary of State. Original certificates of pardons and paroles, including revocation of same are recorded and filed in the Office of the Secretary of State. Extraditions, both foreign and domestic, are also recorded and maintained by the Secretary. The office is the custodian of the Seal of Oklahoma. The Secretary of State is an ex officio member of the Oklahoma Governor's Cabinet.

As required by the Oklahoma Administrative Procedures Act and Executive Order 88-16, the Secretary of State is responsible for overseeing and operating the Office of Administrative Rules (OAR). OAR files all rules, rule making notices, and executive orders issued by all state agencies and the Governor. OAR collects all such rules and represents them to the Governor for his approve or disapproval. With very limited exceptions, no agency rule may be enforced until it is filed with OAR, approved by the Governor, and then published by OAR.

The most important, though ceremonial, function of the Secretary of State is to "sacredly preserve" the original State Constitution signed in 1907.

=== Legislative functions ===
After legislation has been passed and signed by the Governor, along with the President of the Senate and Speaker of the House, the Secretary of State is required to fill and record the original acts in the Office of the Secretary of State. Each act is designated a chapter number and published in the Oklahoma Session Laws and the Oklahoma Statutes. The Secretary of State is also required to distribute copies of all new laws, as soon as possible, to each of the seventy-seven County Court Clerks. The original acts and resolutions are bound into volumes and then preserved by the Secretary's office.

Any and all initiatives, petitions, and referendum (called State Questions) are filled with the Secretary and addressed to the Governor. After circulation of the petition, the Secretary's office counts and binds the signature pamphlets. If the signatures are sufficient, the state question is placed on the ballot for a vote of the people. New laws adopted by the people are published in the Oklahoma Statutes or Oklahoma Constitution and are immune from override by the Oklahoma Legislature, Governor of Oklahoma, or the Oklahoma Supreme Court.

=== Judicial functions ===
Under the provision of the Oklahoma Constitution, the judges of any court exercising judicial power shall be subject to removal from office, or to compulsory retirement from office by the Oklahoma Court on the Judiciary. The Secretary of State is required to determine and designate five district judges to serve on the Appellate Division and eight district judges to serve on the Trial Division of the Court on Judiciary. Every odd-numbered year this office is responsible for organizing the meeting for the Court on Judiciary to make or amend their rules of procedure as mandated by the Oklahoma Constitution.

=== Certification functions ===
The main duties of the Secretary of State revolve around filling, recording, and certification of miscellaneous items. They include:

- Persons wishing to form a corporation, limited partnership or limited liability company register in the Office of the Secretary of State. Foreign corporations (those formed in other states or countries) who desire to transact business in Oklahoma must also file in this office.
- The Secretary's department issues trademark renewals, assignments and cancellations.
- The Secretary of State appoints and commissions notaries public. Each notary public is required to file a $1,000 surety bond with the court clerk in their county of residence. Once this bond is filed, the court clerk sends the bond to the Secretary of State where it is recorded and filed.
- Every officer of a state agency, board, commission, court, institution, and the state legislature, before entering upon the duties of office, is required to file an oath of office and a loyalty oath with the Secretary of State.
- All state agencies, boards, commissions and public trusts are required to file in the Office of the Secretary of State all meeting notices, including cancellations, postponements and rescheduling of meeting in compliance with state open meeting laws.
- The Secretary of State acts as registered agent for all foreign corporations, limited partnerships and limited liability companies unless an additional agent has been appointed. The Secretary of State also acts as registered agent for any domestic corporation whose agent has resigned.
- Every mortgage, deed of trust, and instruments supplementary thereto of a public service corporation covering any real or personal property situated in this state made to secure any indebtedness incurred pursuant to law, shall be executed and acknowledged in the same manner as conveyances of real estate and shall be recorded or files with the Secretary of State.
- Every invention developer rendering or offering to render invention development services shall maintain a surety bond equal to either ten percent (10%) of the invention developer's gross income from the invention development business in this state during the invention developer's preceding fiscal year, or twenty-five thousand dollars ($25,000), whichever is larger. A copy of the bond shall be approved by the Attorney General and filed in the Office of the Secretary of State before the invention developer renders or offers to render invention development services in this state.
- Every mineral owner or lessee who is engaged in drilling or preparing to drill for oil or gas is required to file a corporate surety bond, letter of credit from a banking institution, cash, or a certificate of deposit with the Secretary of State in the sum of $25,000. The Secretary of State is required by law to file and record each bond filed.
- Required to file and/or certify policy statements of each public institution of higher education. Personality rights as successor-in-interest, public trust indentures and amendments thereto, preliminary and final official statements, facsimile signatures.

== Office of the Secretary of State ==
=== Organization ===
- Secretary of State
  - Administration Division
  - Accounting Division
  - Information Services Division
  - Central Filing Division
  - Notary Division
  - Business Services Division
  - Executive and Legislative Services Division
  - Office of Administrative Rules

The Office of Administrative Rules (OAR) is one of the most important offices within the Office of the Secretary of State. OAR files state agency rules, rulemaking notices, executive orders and compiles those rules, rulemaking notices, executive orders, and local project announcements for publication in The Oklahoma Register, which OAR publishes semi-monthly. OAR is also responsible for compiling and codifying the permanent rules and executive orders for publication in The Oklahoma Administrative Code (OAC). OAC is the codification of the general and permanent rules and regulations issued by the executive departments and agencies of the state government. OAR publishes the OAC in annual supplements.

=== Staff ===
The Office of the Secretary of State, with an annual budget of over $4 million, is one of the smaller employers of the State. For fiscal year 2011, the Office was authorized 37 full-time employees.

Division	Number of employees
Administration Division	11
Business Services Division	14
Executive and Legislative Services Division	3
Central Filing Division	5
Office of Administrative Rules	4
Total	37

=== Budget ===
The Office of the Secretary of State's budget is generated primarily be fees it generates from the entities it regulates. Agency fees make up 90% ($3.8 million) with the remaining 10% ($0.4 million) coming from annual appropriations from the Oklahoma Legislature.

For fiscal year 2011, each of the operating units of the Bureau operate with the following budgets:

Division	Funding (in millions)
Administration Division	$1.7
Business Services Division	$1.3
Executive and Legislative Services Division	$0.2
Central Filing Division	$0.4
Office of Administrative Rules	$0.5
Total	$4.2

== Salary ==
The annual salary of the Secretary of State is set by law at $90,000.

== Agencies overseen ==
The Secretary of State oversees the following state entities:

- Oklahoma Council on Judicial Complaints
- Oklahoma State Election Board
- Oklahoma Ethics Commission
- Oklahoma Judicial Nominating Commission
- Oklahoma Department of Libraries

== Oath of office ==
"I, . . . . . . . , do solemnly swear (or affirm) that I will support, obey, and defend the Constitution of the United States, and the Constitution of the State of Oklahoma, and that I will not, knowingly, receive, directly or indirectly, any money or other valuable thing, for the performance or nonperformance of any act or duty pertaining to my office, other than the compensation allowed by law; I further swear (or affirm) that I will faithfully discharge my duties as Secretary of State of Oklahoma to the best of my ability."

== Officeholders ==
Statewide election (1907–1975)

#	Image	Name	Party	Term
1		William Macklin Cross	Democratic	1907–1910
2		Thomas Smith	Democratic	1910–1911
3		Ben F. Harrison	Democratic	1911–1915
4		H. G. Oliver	Democratic	1915
5		Joseph Lucien Lyon	Democratic	1915–1919
6		Joe Morris	Democratic	1919–1923
7		Richard A. Sneed	Democratic	1923–1927
8		John Graves Leeper	Democratic	1927–1931
9		Richard A. Sneed	Democratic	1931–1935
10		Frank Carter	Democratic	1935–1939
11		Charles C. Childers	Democratic	1939–1943
12		Frank Carter	Democratic	1943–1946
13		Kathrine Manton	Democratic	1946–1947
14		Wilburn Cartwright	Democratic	1947–1951
15		John D. Conner	Democratic	1951–1955
16		Andy Elmer Anderson	Democratic	1955–1959
17		John D. Conner	Democratic	1959–1959
18		William N. Christian	Democratic	1959–1963
19		James M. Bullard	Democratic	1963–1967
20		John Rogers	Democratic	1967–1975

Gubernatorial appointment (1975–present)

#	Image	Name	Party	Term	Governor
21		Jerome Byrd	Democratic	1975–1979	David L. Boren
22		Jeanette Edmondson	Democratic	1979–1987	George Nigh
23		Hannah D. Atkins	Democratic	1987–1991	Henry Bellmon
24		John Kennedy	Democratic	1991–1994	David Walters
25		Glo Henley	Democratic	1994–1995	David Walters
26		Tom Cole	Republican	1995–1999	Frank Keating
27		Mike Hunter	Republican	1999–2002	Frank Keating
28		Kay Dudley	Republican	2002–2003	Frank Keating
29		M. Susan Savage	Democratic	2003–2011	Brad Henry
30		Glenn Coffee	Republican	2011–2013	Mary Fallin
31		Michelle Day	Republican	2013	Mary Fallin
32		Larry Parman	Republican	2013	Mary Fallin
31		Chris Benge	Republican	2013–2016	Mary Fallin
32		Mike Hunter	Republican	2016–2017	Mary Fallin
33		Dave Lopez	Republican	2017–2018	Mary Fallin
34		Jim Williamson	Republican	2018–2019	Mary Fallin
35		Michael Rogers	Republican	2019–2020	Kevin Stitt
36		Brian Bingman	Republican	2020–2023	Kevin Stitt
37		Josh Cockroft	Republican	2023–2025	Kevin Stitt
38		Benjamin Lepak	Republican	2025–present	Kevin Stitt

== See also ==
- List of company registers
