= Wes Watkins =

American politician (1938–2025)

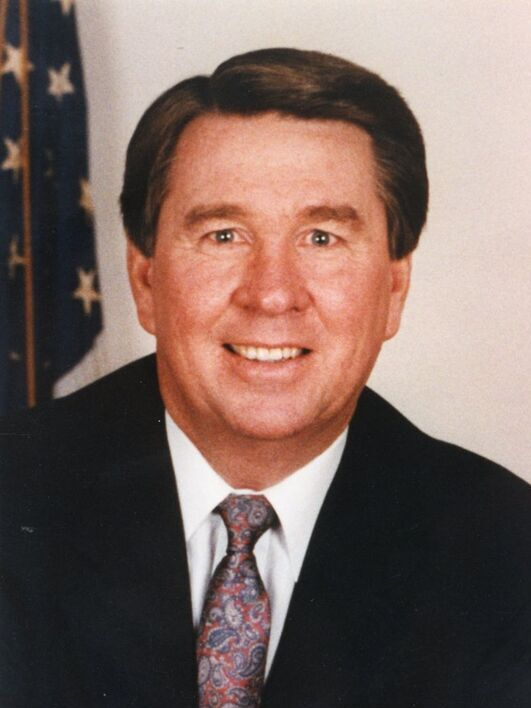
- Official portrait, c. 1997–2003

Member of the U.S. House of Representatives from Oklahoma's 3rd district
- In office January 3, 1997 – January 3, 2003
- Preceded by: Bill Brewster
- Succeeded by: Frank Lucas
- In office January 3, 1977 – January 3, 1991
- Preceded by: Carl Albert
- Succeeded by: Bill Brewster

Member of the Oklahoma Senate from the 13th district
- In office November 5, 1974 – 1976
- Preceded by: George A. Miller
- Succeeded by: James W. McDaniel

Personal details
- Born: Wesley Wade Watkins; December 15, 1938 De Queen, Arkansas, U.S.
- Died: March 26, 2025 (aged 86) Stillwater, Oklahoma, U.S.
- Party: Democratic (before 1994); Independent (1994–1996); Republican (1996–2025)
- Education: Oklahoma State (BS, MS)

Military service
- Allegiance: United States
- Branch: United States Air Force
- Service years: 1960–1967
- Unit: Oklahoma Air National Guard

Wesley Wade Watkins (December 15, 1938 – March 26, 2025) was an American politician from the state of Oklahoma. Watkins was a member of the United States House of Representatives where he represented Oklahoma's 3rd congressional district for 14 years as a Democrat and then for six years as a Republican.

== Early life and career ==
Watkins was born in De Queen, Arkansas, on December 15, 1938, but grew up in Bryan County. He graduated from Oklahoma State University in 1960, receiving a Master's degree from that same school in 1961. While at OSU, he was the president of the student body and student senate.

After a brief stint working for the United States Department of Agriculture, he worked as an administrator at his alma mater from 1963 to 1966. During that time, he was initiated into Tau Kappa Epsilon fraternity as an honorary member while serving as their faculty advisor. From 1960 to 1967, he served in the Oklahoma National Guard.

== State senator and U. S. congressman ==
Watkins was elected to the Oklahoma State Senate in 1974. Two years later, U.S. House Speaker Carl Albert announced his retirement after 30 years representing the 3rd District. Based in the southeastern part of the state, an area known as Little Dixie, the 3rd was heavily Democratic in both local and national elections.

Watkins faced a formidable opponent in Albert's popular longtime Chief of Staff and Administrative Assistant, Charles Ward. However, Watkins had closer local ties in the district, while Ward had spent decades in Washington. Watkins prevailed in the Democratic primary runoff and he then gained Albert's endorsement and won the general election with 82% of the vote.

He was later reelected six more times, always by close to 80% of the vote. For most of this time, he served on the Budget or Appropriations Committees.

== Gubernatorial campaigns ==
=== 1990 campaign for governor as a Democrat ===
Watkins did not seek an eighth term in 1990, instead running for the Democratic nomination for governor to succeed Republican Henry Bellmon. He raised nearly $3 million for his campaign, at one point outspending his opponents by nearly $1.4 million in June 1990. In the Democratic primary, he ran ahead of House Speaker Steve Lewis, yet lost to eventual winner David Walters, who had been the Democratic Gubernatorial nominee four years earlier in 1986.

=== 1994 campaign for governor as an independent ===
Watkins was openly disappointed in the lack of support from the state Democratic hierarchy, and by 1994 began referring to the Oklahoma Democratic Party as an organization run by "arrogant political bosses". By later in 1994, Watkins ran for governor again, this time as an independent. He only won 23% of the vote. However, his independent candidacy siphoned off enough votes from Lieutenant Governor Jack Mildren, the Democratic candidate, to allow Frank Keating, a Reagan administration official, to become only the third Republican governor in Oklahoma history at that point. Watkins tallied over 233,000 votes, far more than Keating's 171,000-vote margin over Mildren. He won by heavy margins in rural areas, particularly his former congressional district, winning many of the counties there by large margins.

== Return to Congress ==
In 1996, Brewster decided to retire from Congress as it became known that Watkins wanted his seat back. The Republican House leadership persuaded Watkins to run as a Republican, seeing a chance to win a seat where they had never made a serious bid since Oklahoma joined the Union in 1907. They promised Watkins a seat on the Ways and Means Committee with full seniority if he ran as a Republican and won. He went on to vote with the Republican majority 97% of the time, which was far more often than when he was a Democrat in prior years, usually voting with the Democratic caucus only 50% of the time from 1974 to 1990.

Watkins initially planned to retire from office in 1998 after undergoing back surgery, but was persuaded to run again, shocking many Democratic insiders who had expected him to retire. He was handily re-elected that year, defeating Walt Roberts. He faced no major-party opposition when he ran for his third term in 2000.

Watkins's voting record in his first period in Congress had been characterized as somewhat moderate. During his second period, however, his voting record was strongly conservative, usually receiving ratings in the high 90s from the American Conservative Union.

=== Retirement from Congress ===
Oklahoma lost a congressional seat after the 2000 census due to slower than expected population growth. The final map saw Watkins's district dismantled, with its territory split between three nearby districts, creating initial uncertainty as to which Republican incumbents would run again. His home in Stillwater (where he had lived since 1990) was drawn into the western Oklahoma-based 3rd district (the former 6th district), represented by fellow Republican Frank Lucas. Most of his old base in Little Dixie was merged into the Muskogee-based 2nd district. The western portion, including Watkins's former home in Ada, was drawn into the Norman-based 4th district. Watkins therefore announced he would retire, in hopes that this would help prevent his fellow Republican incumbents from having to run against each other. In an indication of how much his politics had changed since leaving the House for the first time, Watkins served as honorary chairman for conservative Senator Jim Inhofe's bid for a second full term.

=== Post-congressional career ===
After leaving Congress, he was hired as a senior legislative analyst at the Washington, D.C.–based lobbying and public relations firm Fleishman-Hillard.

Watkins died from a cardiac arrest in Stillwater, Oklahoma, on March 26, 2025, at the age of 86.

== Legacy ==
After retirement, Wes Watkins continued to focus on issues of economic development, global hunger, global trade, and utilizing innovative technologies to address these issues. He founded a non-profit ministry, Matthew 24.40 Foundation, to provide scholarships for students to install hydroponics systems in diverse global locations to address issues of hunger.

- The Wes Watkins Center for International Trade Development at Oklahoma State University was established in 1990 to increase the economic competitiveness of the state of Oklahoma and to assist Oklahoma-based businesses to engage in global trade. It is an extension unit within the School of Global Studies and Partnerships at Oklahoma State University.
- Wes Watkins Technology Center.
- Inducted into Oklahoma CareerTech Hall of Fame in 1991.
- Wes Watkins Reservoir in central Oklahoma was named in honor of him.

== See also ==
- Little Dixie
- Oklahoma Democratic Party
- Oklahoma Republican Party
- Oklahoma's congressional districts
- Party switching in the United States
- Politics of Oklahoma
- Wes Watkins Reservoir

U.S. House of Representatives
Preceded by Carl Albert	Member of the U.S. House of Representatives from Oklahoma's 3rd congressional district 1977–1991	Succeeded by Bill Brewster
Preceded by Bill Brewster	Member of the U.S. House of Representatives from Oklahoma's 3rd congressional district 1997–2003	Succeeded by Frank Lucas
