= Senator Cartwright =

Senator Cartwright may refer to:

- Barbara Cartwright (fl. 2020s), Senate of the Bahamas
- Buck Cartwright (1907–1991), Oklahoma State Senate
- George W. Cartwright (1863–1939), California State Senate
- Keith Cartwright (1911–1972), Oklahoma State Senate
- Richard John Cartwright (1835–1912), Senate of Canada
- Wilburn Cartwright (1892–1979), Oklahoma State Senate
