= Jackson Robert Cartwright =

American politician

Member of the Oklahoma House of Representatives
- In office 1929–1932

Personal details
- Born: 1870/1871
- Died: December 7, 1957
- Political party: Democratic Party
- Children: Wilburn Cartwright; Keith Cartwright; Buck Cartwright
- Relatives: Jan Eric Cartwright (grandson); Lynn Cartwright (granddaughter); Peter Cartwright (great-uncle)

Jackson Robert Cartwright (1870/1871 – December 7, 1957) was an American politician and Baptist preacher from Oklahoma. He served in the Oklahoma House of Representatives between 1929 and 1932. He was the father of Wilburn Cartwright.

== Career and family ==
Jackson Robert Cartwright moved to Wapanucka, Oklahoma in 1903, where he was a Baptist preacher for over 50 years. He served two terms in the Oklahoma House of Representatives elected in 1928 and 1930. He also served as chaplain for the Oklahoma House. He was a member of the Democratic Party.

Cartwright was the patriarch of the Cartwright political family in Oklahoma. The family included three of his sons who served in elected office: Wilburn Cartwright, Keith Cartwright, and Buck Cartwright. He married Emma Baker Cartwright and they had eight children. He died December 7, 1957.
