= 1990 Oklahoma gubernatorial election =

- November 6, 1990
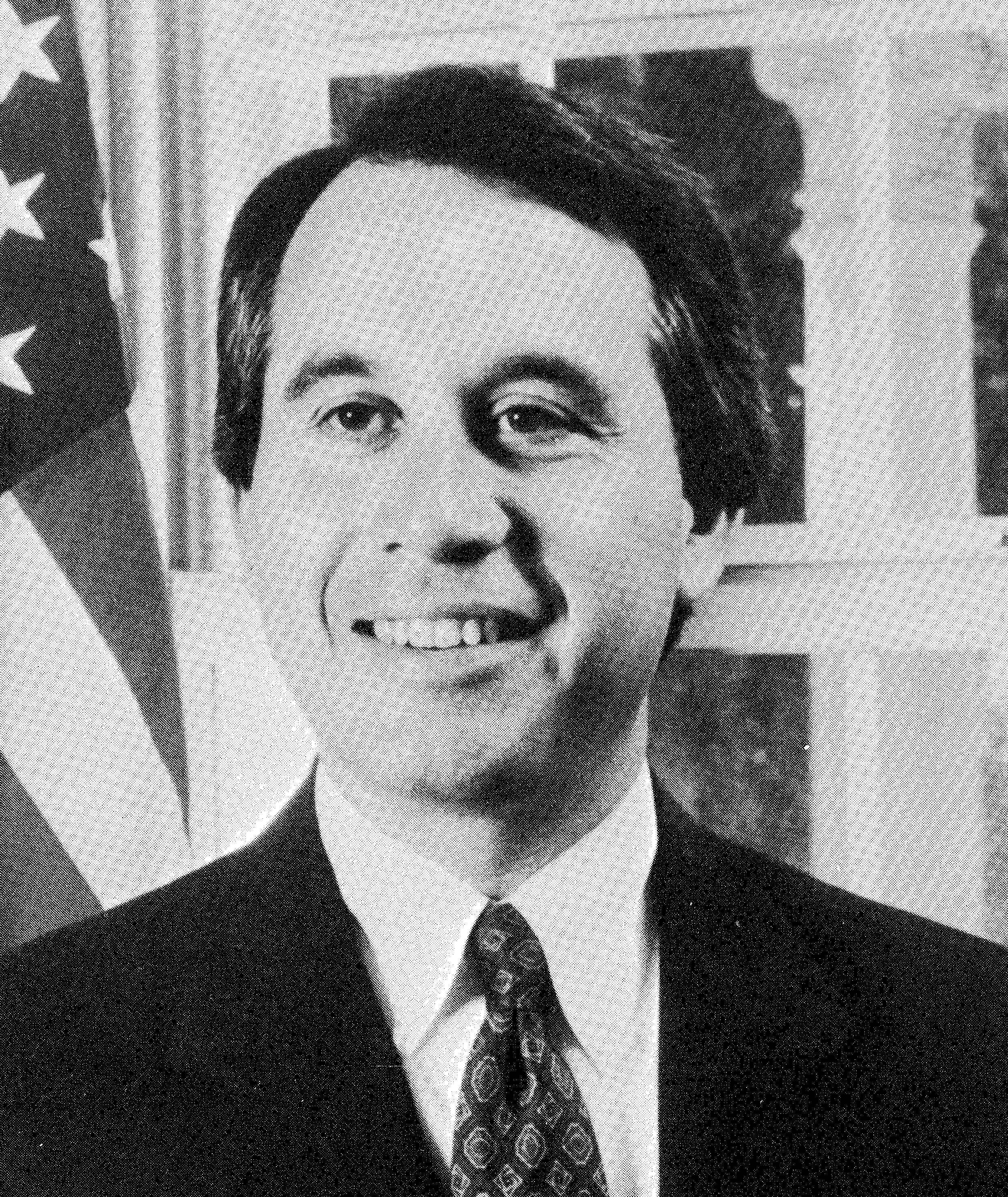

Nominee	David Walters	Bill Price	Thomas Ledgerwood
Party	Democratic	Republican	Independent
Popular vote	523,196	297,584	90,534
Percentage	57.41%	32.65%	9.93%
- County results Walters: 40–50% 50–60% 60–70% 70–80% Price: 40–50% 50–60%
Governor before election
Henry Bellmon
Republican
Elected Governor
David Walters
Democratic

The 1990 Oklahoma gubernatorial election was held on November 6, 1990, to elect the governor of Oklahoma. Democratic businessman David Walters won the election easily despite his lack of political experience.

This is most recent gubernatorial election in which Cimarron County has voted Democratic.

== Primary election ==
Primary elections were held on August 28, 1990 with runoffs occurring on September 18, 1990.

=== Democratic party ===
Businessman David Walters secured the Democratic nomination for the second consecutive election after defeating US Representative Wes Watkins in a runoff.

==== Candidates ====
- John "Shorty" Barnett
- Anne Hartin Langston
- Steve Lewis, Speaker of the Oklahoma House of Representatives
- David Walters, businessman and nominee for governor in 1986
- Wes Watkins, representative from Oklahoma's 3rd congressional district

==== Results ====
Democratic primary results
Party	Candidate	Votes	%
Democratic	Wes Watkins	175,568	32.33%
Democratic	David Walters	171,730	31.63%
Democratic	Steve Lewis	160,455	29.55%
Democratic	John "Shorty" Barnett	23,648	4.36%
Democratic	Anne Hartin Langston	11,605	2.14%
Total votes		543,006	100.00%

Democratic primary runoff results
Party	Candidate	Votes	%
Democratic	David Walters	243,252	50.69%
Democratic	Wes Watkins	236,597	49.31%
Total votes		479,849	100.00%

=== Republican party ===
==== Candidates ====
- Vince Orza, businessman
- Bill Price, former U.S. Attorney for the Western District of Oklahoma
- Burns Hargis, attorney
- Jerry Brown, independent candidate for governor in 1986
- Jerry Hoyt

==== Results ====
Republican primary results
Party	Candidate	Votes	%
Republican	Vince Orza	75,992	40.11%
Republican	Bill Price	51,355	27.11%
Republican	Burns Hargis	33,641	17.76%
Republican	Jerry Brown	25,670	13.55%
Republican	Jerry Hoyt	2,792	1.47%
Total votes		189,450	100.00%

Republican primary runoff results
Party	Candidate	Votes	%
Republican	Bill Price	94,682	50.83%
Republican	Vince Orza	91,599	49.17%
Total votes		186,281	100.00%

== General Election ==
=== Results ===
1990 Oklahoma gubernatorial election
Party	Candidate	Votes	%	±%
Democratic	David Walters	523,196	57.41%	+12.87%
Republican	Bill Price	297,584	32.65%	−14.80%
Independent	Thomas D. Ledgerwood II	90,534	9.93%	
Total votes		913,314	100.00%	
Majority		225,612	24.76%	
Democratic gain from Republican		Swing	+27.67%	

=== Results by county ===
County	David Walters Democratic		Bill Price Republican		Thomas D. Ledgerwood Independent		Margin		Total votes cast
County	#	%	#	%	#	%	#	%	Total votes cast
Adair	2,512	62.89%	1,168	29.24%	314	7.86%	1,344	33.65%	3,994
Alfalfa	1,313	49.38%	874	32.87%	472	17.75%	439	16.51%	2,659
Atoka	2,826	74.51%	818	21.57%	149	3.93%	2,008	52.94%	3,793
Beaver	1,025	44.20%	1,082	46.66%	212	9.14%	-57	-2.46%	2,319
Beckham	4,041	71.38%	1,321	23.34%	299	5.28%	2,720	48.05%	5,661
Blaine	2,517	55.82%	1,262	27.99%	730	16.19%	1,255	27.83%	4,509
Bryan	5,805	72.04%	1,969	24.44%	284	3.52%	3,836	47.60%	8,058
Caddo	5,833	69.42%	1,846	21.97%	723	8.61%	3,987	47.45%	8,402
Canadian	10,200	47.26%	8,721	40.40%	2,663	12.34%	1,479	6.85%	21,584
Carter	8,249	64.89%	3,557	27.98%	906	7.13%	4,692	36.91%	12,712
Cherokee	6,750	68.34%	2,180	22.07%	947	9.59%	4,570	46.27%	9,877
Choctaw	3,878	76.28%	1,086	21.36%	120	2.36%	2,792	54.92%	5,084
Cimarron	683	48.58%	635	45.16%	88	6.26%	48	3.41%	1,406
Cleveland	24,222	51.77%	16,802	35.91%	5,762	12.32%	7,420	15.86%	46,786
Coal	1,621	74.32%	429	19.67%	131	6.01%	1,192	54.65%	2,181
Comanche	13,159	59.80%	7,890	35.85%	957	4.35%	5,269	23.94%	22,006
Cotton	1,777	75.46%	524	22.25%	54	2.29%	1,253	53.21%	2,355
Craig	2,862	65.34%	1,161	26.51%	357	8.15%	1,701	38.84%	4,380
Creek	8,904	59.96%	4,176	28.12%	1,771	11.93%	4,728	31.84%	14,851
Custer	5,516	63.12%	2,475	28.32%	748	8.56%	3,041	34.80%	8,739
Delaware	4,581	62.01%	2,132	28.86%	675	9.14%	2,449	33.15%	7,388
Dewey	1,459	60.51%	637	26.42%	315	13.07%	822	34.09%	2,411
Ellis	1,078	54.42%	623	31.45%	280	14.13%	455	22.97%	1,981
Garfield	9,543	52.46%	5,806	31.92%	2,843	15.63%	3,737	20.54%	18,192
Garvin	5,335	62.19%	2,312	26.95%	931	10.85%	3,023	35.24%	8,578
Grady	7,387	59.49%	3,817	30.74%	1,214	9.78%	3,570	28.75%	12,418
Grant	1,317	49.98%	786	29.83%	532	20.19%	531	20.15%	2,635
Greer	1,745	69.14%	608	24.09%	171	6.77%	1,137	45.05%	2,524
Harmon	1,116	75.87%	300	20.39%	55	3.74%	816	55.47%	1,471
Harper	901	49.89%	597	33.06%	308	17.05%	304	16.83%	1,806
Haskell	3,137	75.75%	750	18.11%	254	6.13%	2,387	57.64%	4,141
Hughes	3,008	68.50%	900	20.50%	483	11.00%	2,108	48.01%	4,391
Jackson	4,310	66.10%	1,796	27.55%	414	6.35%	2,514	38.56%	6,520
Jefferson	1,831	76.71%	470	19.69%	86	3.60%	1,361	57.02%	2,387
Johnston	2,015	72.48%	599	21.55%	166	5.97%	1,416	50.94%	2,780
Kay	7,737	51.39%	5,439	36.13%	1,878	12.48%	2,298	15.27%	15,054
Kingfisher	2,306	45.43%	2,087	41.12%	683	13.46%	219	4.31%	5,076
Kiowa	2,805	71.05%	923	23.38%	220	5.57%	1,882	47.67%	3,948
Latimer	2,245	72.72%	608	19.70%	234	7.58%	1,637	53.03%	3,087
Le Flore	8,602	74.69%	2,622	22.77%	293	2.54%	5,980	51.92%	11,517
Lincoln	4,995	55.29%	2,860	31.65%	1,180	13.06%	2,135	23.63%	9,035
Logan	5,247	53.75%	3,446	35.30%	1,068	10.94%	1,801	18.45%	9,761
Love	1,804	74.61%	471	19.48%	143	5.91%	1,333	55.13%	2,418
Major	1,581	48.44%	1,120	34.31%	563	17.25%	461	14.12%	3,264
Marshall	2,880	71.54%	930	23.10%	216	5.37%	1,950	48.44%	4,026
Mayes	6,539	63.62%	2,702	26.29%	1,037	10.09%	3,837	37.33%	10,278
McClain	4,389	59.33%	2,177	29.43%	831	11.23%	2,212	29.90%	7,397
McCurtain	5,584	77.17%	1,434	19.82%	218	3.01%	4,150	57.35%	7,236
McIntosh	4,466	72.41%	1,229	19.93%	473	7.67%	3,237	52.48%	6,168
Murray	2,824	66.10%	987	23.10%	461	10.79%	1,837	43.00%	4,272
Muskogee	11,525	64.96%	4,526	25.51%	1,691	9.53%	6,999	39.45%	17,742
Noble	2,144	50.45%	1,417	33.34%	689	16.21%	727	17.11%	4,250
Nowata	1,996	61.38%	920	28.29%	336	10.33%	1,076	33.09%	3,252
Okfuskee	2,390	67.82%	794	22.53%	340	9.65%	1,596	45.29%	3,524
Oklahoma	85,019	49.79%	69,514	40.71%	16,239	9.51%	15,505	9.08%	170,772
Okmulgee	6,811	65.27%	2,432	23.31%	1,192	11.42%	4,379	41.96%	10,435
Osage	7,249	63.72%	2,829	24.87%	1,299	11.42%	4,420	38.85%	11,377
Ottawa	5,854	70.66%	2,014	24.31%	417	5.03%	3,840	46.35%	8,285
Pawnee	2,703	57.57%	1,372	29.22%	620	13.21%	1,331	28.35%	4,695
Payne	9,921	55.29%	5,803	32.34%	2,220	12.37%	4,118	22.95%	17,944
Pittsburg	8,797	69.17%	3,010	23.67%	911	7.16%	5,787	45.50%	12,718
Pontotoc	5,785	53.15%	3,605	33.12%	1,495	13.73%	2,180	20.03%	10,885
Pottawatomie	10,141	56.73%	5,823	32.57%	1,913	10.70%	4,318	24.15%	17,877
Pushmataha	3,121	78.38%	749	18.81%	112	2.81%	2,372	59.57%	3,982
Roger Mills	1,304	66.19%	459	23.30%	207	10.51%	845	42.89%	1,970
Rogers	9,517	57.15%	5,075	30.47%	2,061	12.38%	4,442	26.67%	16,653
Seminole	5,157	64.31%	2,135	26.62%	727	9.07%	3,022	37.69%	8,019
Sequoyah	7,250	75.40%	1,970	20.49%	395	4.11%	5,280	54.91%	9,615
Stephens	8,556	60.05%	4,784	33.58%	907	6.37%	3,772	26.48%	14,247
Texas	2,063	41.74%	2,585	52.31%	294	5.95%	-522	-10.56%	4,942
Tillman	2,166	71.82%	743	24.64%	107	3.55%	1,423	47.18%	3,016
Tulsa	72,730	52.76%	49,403	35.84%	15,710	11.40%	23,327	16.92%	137,843
Wagoner	7,334	58.13%	3,911	31.00%	1,372	10.87%	3,423	27.13%	12,617
Washington	8,072	49.83%	6,419	39.63%	1,707	10.54%	1,653	10.20%	16,198
Washita	3,175	73.29%	800	18.47%	357	8.24%	2,375	54.82%	4,332
Woods	2,215	55.82%	1,259	31.73%	494	12.45%	956	24.09%	3,968
Woodward	3,741	56.34%	2,089	31.46%	810	12.20%	1,652	24.88%	6,640
Totals	523,196	57.41%	297,584	32.65%	90,534	9.93%	225,612	24.76%	911,314

==== Counties that flipped from Republican to Democratic ====
- Alfalfa
- Blaine
- Canadian
- Cherokee
- Cimarron
- Cleveland
- Creek
- Custer
- Ellis
- Garfield
- Grant
- Harper
- Kay
- Kingfisher
- Major
- Mayes
- Noble
- Oklahoma
- Pawnee
- Payne
- Rogers
- Tulsa
- Wagoner
- Washington
- Woods
- Woodward
