= Jan Eric Cartwright =

American politician (1938–1986)

12th Attorney General of Oklahoma
- In office January 8, 1979 – January 10, 1983
- Governor: George Nigh
- Preceded by: Larry Derryberry
- Succeeded by: Mike Turpen

Oklahoma Corporation Commissioner
- In office January 1977 – January 8, 1979
- Governor: David Boren
- Preceded by: Ray C. Jones
- Succeeded by: Norma Eagleton

Counsel to the Governor of Oklahoma
- In office 1973–1976
- Governor: David Boren

Member of the Oklahoma House of Representatives from the 13th District (Muskogee County)
- In office January 5, 1971 – January 2, 1973
- Preceded by: Jim Barker
- Succeeded by: Drew Edmondson

Personal details
- Born: August 26, 1938 Wewoka, Oklahoma, U.S.
- Died: February 21, 1986 (aged 47) Oklahoma City, Oklahoma, U.S.
- Party: Democratic
- Parent: Buck Cartwright (father)
- Relatives: Jackson Robert Cartwright (grandfather); Wilburn Cartwright (uncle); Keith Cartwright (uncle); Lynn Cartwright (cousin)

Jan Eric Cartwright (August 26, 1938 – February 21, 1986) was an American politician who served in the Oklahoma House of Representatives from the 13th district from 1971 to 1973 and as the Attorney General of Oklahoma from 1979 to 1983. He was a member of the Democratic Party.

He died of leukemia on February 21, 1986, in Oklahoma City at age 47.

== Career ==
- Private Practice, 1963–65
- Assistant County Attorney for Muskogee County, 1965
- Assistant US Attorney for Eastern District of Oklahoma, 1965–67
- Private Practice, 1967–1971
- State Representative for 13th District (Muskogee County), 1971–1973
- Counsel to Governor David Boren, 1973–1976
- Commissioner of the Oklahoma Corporation Commission, 1976–1979
- Attorney General of Oklahoma, 1979–1983
- Private Practice, 1983–86

Party political offices
Preceded by Larry Derryberry	Democratic nominee for Attorney General of Oklahoma; 1978	Succeeded by Mike Turpen
