= Gilman Rankin =

American film and television actor (1911–1993)

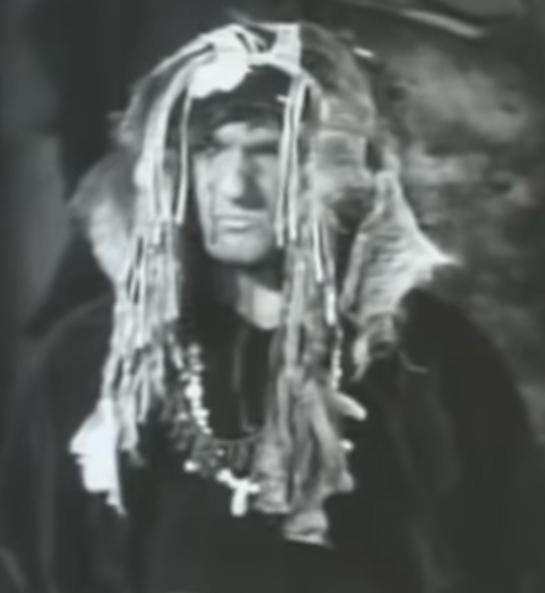
- Rankin in Frontier Doctor, 1958
- Born: Gilman Warren Rankin; April 17, 1911; Boston, Massachusetts, U.S.
- Died: October 31, 1993 (aged 82); Orange County, California, U.S.
- Occupations: Film and television actor
- Years active: 1949–1976

Gilman Warren Rankin (April 17, 1911 – October 31, 1993) was an American film and television actor. He was best known for playing Deputy Charlie Riggs in the first season of the American western television series Tombstone Territory.

== Life and career ==
Rankin was born in Boston, Massachusetts. He began his screen career in 1949, appearing in the film Bride of Vengeance, playing the uncredited role of a scout. In the same year, he appeared in the film The Story of Seabiscuit.

Later in his career, in 1957, Rankin starred as Deputy Charlie Riggs in the ABC western television series Tombstone Territory, starring along with Pat Conway and Richard Eastham. He only appeared in the first season. He guest-starred in television programs including Gunsmoke, The Adventures of Kit Carson, Cheyenne, Two Faces West, Tales of Wells Fargo, Riverboat, State Trooper, The Life and Legend of Wyatt Earp, My Three Sons, Perry Mason and Shotgun Slade. He also appeared in films such as Midnight Cowboy (as Woodsy Niles), Fort Algiers, Roar of the Crowd, The Greatest Show on Earth, Ghost Town and Black Patch.

Rankin retired from acting in 1976, last appearing in the film Assault on Precinct 13.

== Death ==
Rankin died on October 31, 1993, in Orange County, California, at the age of 82.
