= Mike Fair =

Mike Fair may refer to:

- Mike Fair (South Carolina politician) (born 1946), American politician
- Mike Fair (Oklahoma politician) (1942–2022), American politician and businessman
