= Buck Cartwright =

American lawyer (1907–1991)

Member of the Oklahoma Senate
- In office 1958–1962

Member of the Oklahoma House of Representatives
- In office 1955–1958

Personal details
- Born: February 28, 1907 Wapanucka, Oklahoma
- Died: January 22, 1991 (aged 83) Seminole, Oklahoma
- Party: Democratic Party
- Children: Jan Eric Cartwright
- Parent: Jackson Robert Cartwright (father)
- Relatives: Wilburn Cartwright (brother); Keith Cartwright (brother); Lynn Cartwright (niece)
- Education: University of Oklahoma College of Law

Military service
- Branch/service: United States Navy

Clifford Ulysses "Buck" Cartwright (February 28, 1907 – January 22, 1991) was an American politician who served in the Oklahoma House of Representatives between 1955 and 1958 and the Oklahoma Senate between 1958 and 1962. He was the son of Jackson Robert Cartwright and father of Jan Eric Cartwright.

== Biography ==
Cartwright was born in Wapanucka, Oklahoma, on February 28, 1907. He was the son of Jackson Robert Cartwright. He graduated from the University of Oklahoma College of Law in 1942 and joined the U.S. Navy. While in the navy, he was commissioned as an officer.

After returning to Oklahoma, he was an assistant county attorney in Seminole County, Oklahoma and Wewoka, Oklahoma's city attorney. He was a member of the Democratic Party. He served in the Oklahoma House of Representatives between 1955 and 1958 and the Oklahoma Senate between 1958 and 1962. After leaving the Oklahoma Legislature he operated a private law practice in Wewoka. He filed to run for lieutenant governor of Oklahoma in 1966, but withdrew from the race. His brothers Wilburn Cartwright and Keith Cartwright also served in the Oklahoma Legislature. He was the father of Jan Eric Cartwright. Buck Cartwright was the last living member of his family to have held elective office before his death January 22, 1991.
