= Black Patch (film) =

1957 film by Allen H. Miner

- Theatrical release poster
- Directed by: Allen H. Miner
- Written by: Leo Gordon
- Produced by: Allen H. Miner
- Starring: George Montgomery
- Cinematography: Edward Colman
- Edited by: John Post; Jerry Young
- Music by: Jerry Goldsmith
- Color process: Black and white
- Production company: Montgomery Productions
- Distributed by: Warner Bros. Pictures
- Release date: September 15, 1957
- Running time: 83 minutes
- Country: United States
- Language: English

Black Patch is a 1957 American Western film directed by Allen H. Miner and starring George Montgomery.

== Plot ==
In a New Mexico town, two former pals from the Civil War, Clay Morgan and Hank Danner, meet again; but Morgan is town marshal and Danner is a wanted bank robber. They both love Helen, Danner's wife.

== Cast ==
- George Montgomery as Clay Morgan
- Diane Brewster as Helen Danner
- Tom Pittman as Flytrap
- Leo Gordon as Hank Danner
- House Peters Jr. as Holman
- Jorge Treviño as Pedoline (as George Trevino)
- Lynn Cartwright as Kitty
- Peter Brocco as Harper
- Ted Jacques as Maxton
- Strother Martin as Petey
- Gilman Rankin as Judge Parnell
- Ned Glass as Bar-Keep
- John O'Malley as Colonel
- Stanley Adams as Drummer
- Sebastian Cabot Frenchy De'Vere

== See also ==
- List of American films of 1957
