= 1986 Oklahoma gubernatorial election =

- November 4, 1986
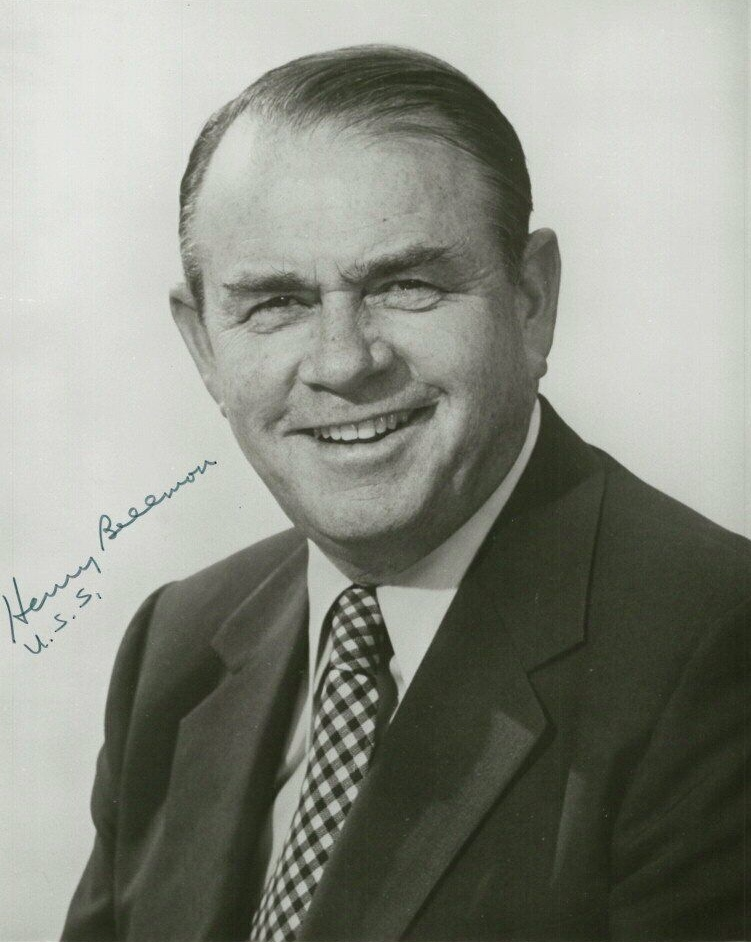

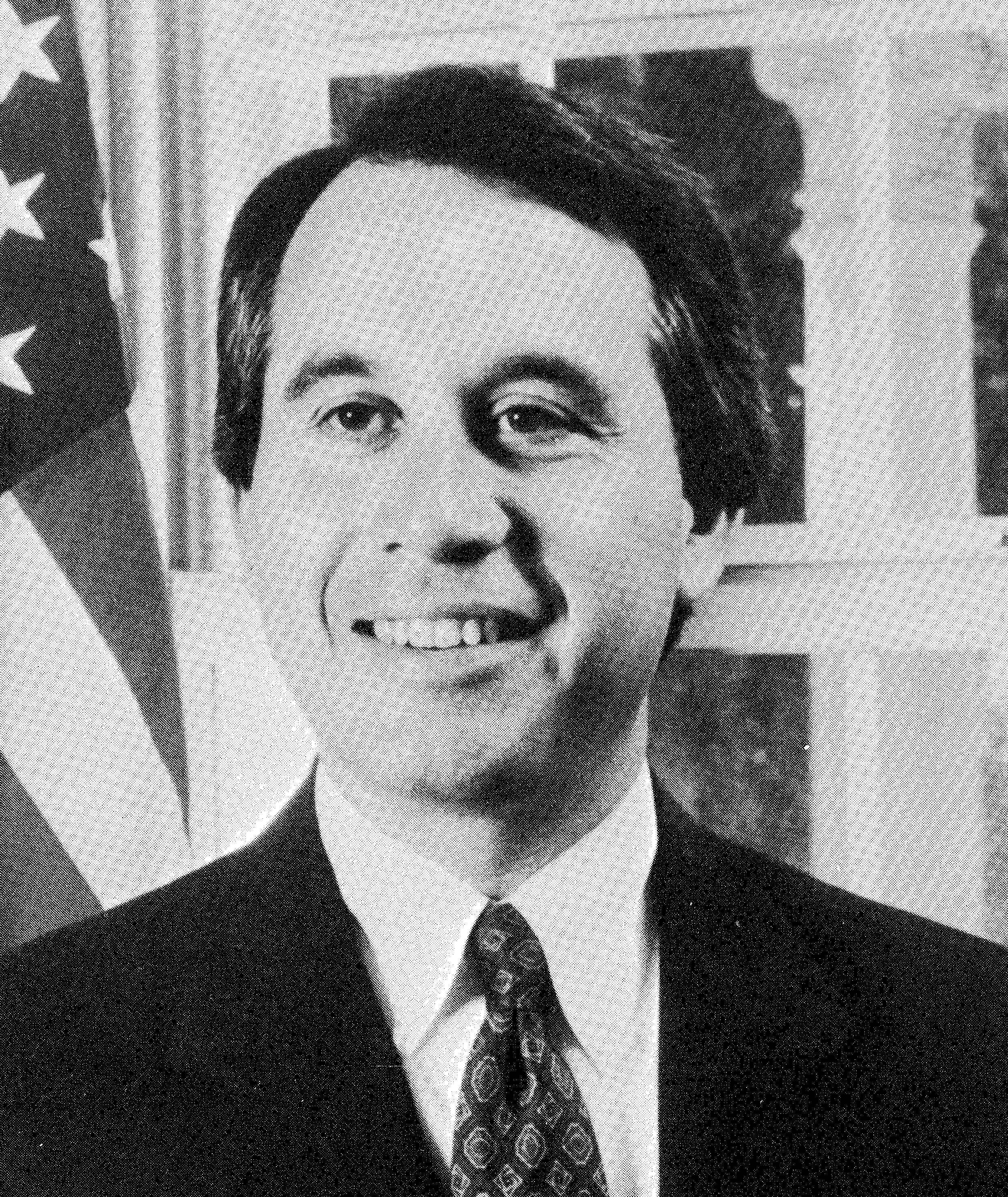

Nominee	Henry Bellmon	David Walters	Jerry Brown
Party	Republican	Democratic	Independent
Popular vote	431,762	405,295	60,115
Percentage	47.45%	44.54%	6.61%
- County results Bellmon: 40–50% 50–60% 60–70% 70–80% Walters: 40–50% 50–60% 60–70%
Governor before election
George Nigh
Democratic
Elected Governor
Henry Bellmon
Republican

The 1986 Oklahoma gubernatorial election was held on November 4, 1986, to elect the governor of Oklahoma. Republican former Governor and Senator Henry Bellmon won the election by a plurality with Independent Jerry Brown receiving more than twice the number of votes separating Bellmon from Democrat David Walters.

== Primary election ==
Primary elections were held on August 26, 1986 with runoffs occurring on September 16, 1986.

=== Democratic party ===
Businessman David Walters narrowly secured the Democratic nomination in a runoff against state attorney general Mike Turpen.

==== Candidates ====
- Billy Joe Clegg
- Leslie Fisher, former Oklahoma Superintendent of Public Instruction
- Virginia Jenner
- Jack Kelly
- Mike Turpen, Attorney General of Oklahoma
- David Walters, businessman

==== Results ====
Democratic primary results
Party	Candidate	Votes	%
Democratic	David Walters	238,165	46.04%
Democratic	Mike Turpen	207,357	40.08%
Democratic	Leslie Fisher	33,639	6.50%
Democratic	Virginia Jenner	15,822	3.06%
Democratic	Jack Kelly	15,804	3.06%
Democratic	Billy Joe Clegg	6,523	1.26%
Total votes		517,310	100.00%

Democratic primary runoff results
Party	Candidate	Votes	%
Democratic	David Walters	235,373	50.43%
Democratic	Mike Turpen	231,390	49.57%
Total votes		466,763	100.00%

=== Republican party ===
Former governor and United States Senator Henry Bellmon easily secured the Republican nomination in a bid for a second, non-consecutive term.

==== Candidates ====
- Henry Bellmon, former governor (1963-1967) and United States Senator (1969-1981)
- Will Crozier
- Mike Fair, member of Oklahoma House of Representatives
- Robert N. Goodhead
- Monty Keely

==== Results ====
Republican primary results
Party	Candidate	Votes	%
Republican	Henry Bellmon	111,665	70.27%
Republican	Mike Fair	33,266	20.94%
Republican	Will Crozier	5,958	3.75%
Republican	Robert N. Goodhead	4,641	2.92%
Republican	Monty Keely	3,369	2.12%
Total votes		158,899	100.00%

== General Election ==
=== Results ===
1986 Oklahoma gubernatorial election
Party	Candidate	Votes	%	±%
Republican	Henry Bellmon	431,762	47.45%	+9.83%
Democratic	David Walters	405,295	44.54%	−17.53%
Independent	Jerry Brown	60,115	6.61%	
Independent	Nelson "Freckles" Little	12,753	1.40%	
Total votes		909,925	100.00%	
Plurality		26,467	2.91%	
Republican gain from Democratic		Swing	+27.36%	

=== Results by county ===
County	Henry Bellmon Republican		David Walters Democratic		Jerry Brown Independent		Nelson Little Independent		Margin		Total votes cast
County	#	%	#	%	#	%	#	%	#	%	Total votes cast
Adair	2,745	47.16%	2,900	49.82%	120	2.06%	56	0.96%	-155	-2.66%	5,821
Alfalfa	1,422	49.34%	1,147	39.80%	272	9.44%	41	1.42%	275	9.54%	2,882
Atoka	1,505	36.07%	2,520	60.39%	119	2.85%	29	0.69%	-1,015	-24.32%	4,173
Beaver	1,828	71.88%	599	23.55%	101	3.97%	15	0.59%	1,229	48.33%	2,543
Beckham	2,038	32.18%	4,035	63.71%	237	3.74%	23	0.36%	-1,997	-31.53%	6,333
Blaine	2,120	46.59%	1,967	43.23%	432	9.49%	31	0.68%	153	3.36%	4,550
Bryan	2,757	31.31%	5,920	67.23%	103	1.17%	26	0.30%	-3,163	-35.92%	8,806
Caddo	3,345	37.22%	5,105	56.80%	491	5.46%	47	0.52%	-1,760	-19.58%	8,988
Canadian	9,426	47.56%	7,761	39.16%	2,468	12.45%	165	0.83%	1,665	8.40%	19,820
Carter	5,658	42.87%	6,963	52.76%	483	3.66%	93	0.70%	-1,305	-9.89%	13,197
Cherokee	5,124	49.87%	4,609	44.86%	352	3.43%	190	1.85%	515	5.01%	10,275
Choctaw	1,261	28.02%	3,022	67.16%	191	4.24%	26	0.58%	-1,761	-39.13%	4,500
Cimarron	683	51.43%	514	38.70%	117	8.81%	14	1.05%	169	12.73%	1,328
Cleveland	20,186	49.23%	16,182	39.46%	4,282	10.44%	354	0.86%	4,004	9.76%	41,004
Coal	721	33.53%	1,320	61.40%	90	4.19%	19	0.88%	-599	-27.86%	2,150
Comanche	6,892	36.07%	11,362	59.47%	776	4.06%	75	0.39%	-4,470	-23.40%	19,105
Cotton	628	30.60%	1,372	66.86%	46	2.24%	6	0.29%	-744	-36.26%	2,052
Craig	2,127	45.62%	2,361	50.64%	116	2.49%	58	1.24%	-234	-5.02%	4,662
Creek	7,932	46.70%	7,430	43.75%	1,119	6.59%	503	2.96%	502	2.96%	16,984
Custer	4,019	47.92%	3,886	46.33%	423	5.04%	59	0.70%	133	1.59%	8,387
Delaware	3,929	46.61%	4,237	50.26%	158	1.87%	106	1.26%	-308	-3.65%	8,430
Dewey	1,004	44.60%	1,035	45.98%	189	8.40%	23	1.02%	-31	-1.38%	2,251
Ellis	1,128	57.09%	761	38.51%	72	3.64%	15	0.76%	367	18.57%	1,976
Garfield	9,287	51.30%	7,341	40.55%	1,207	6.67%	269	1.49%	1,946	10.75%	18,104
Garvin	3,355	36.90%	5,042	55.45%	631	6.94%	65	0.71%	-1,687	-18.55%	9,093
Grady	4,532	37.69%	6,088	50.63%	1,301	10.82%	103	0.86%	-1,556	-12.94%	12,024
Grant	1,330	47.79%	1,175	42.22%	234	8.41%	44	1.58%	155	5.57%	2,783
Greer	764	34.89%	1,348	61.55%	72	3.29%	6	0.27%	-584	-26.67%	2,190
Harmon	344	26.77%	823	64.05%	109	8.48%	9	0.70%	-479	-37.28%	1,285
Harper	1,065	59.17%	578	32.11%	139	7.72%	18	1.00%	487	27.06%	1,800
Haskell	1,199	29.32%	2,758	67.43%	110	2.69%	23	0.56%	-1,559	-38.12%	4,090
Hughes	1,356	30.09%	2,971	65.92%	155	3.44%	25	0.55%	-1,615	-35.83%	4,507
Jackson	2,480	38.21%	3,611	55.63%	375	5.78%	25	0.39%	-1,131	-17.42%	6,491
Jefferson	636	30.64%	1,373	66.14%	56	2.70%	11	0.53%	-737	-35.50%	2,076
Johnston	1,091	38.29%	1,675	58.79%	68	2.39%	15	0.53%	-584	-20.50%	2,849
Kay	9,588	54.06%	6,880	38.79%	1,035	5.84%	232	1.31%	2,708	15.27%	17,735
Kingfisher	2,934	53.15%	2,026	36.70%	443	8.03%	117	2.12%	908	16.45%	5,520
Kiowa	1,383	35.24%	2,351	59.90%	184	4.69%	7	0.18%	-968	-24.66%	3,925
Latimer	1,094	32.86%	2,125	63.83%	97	2.91%	13	0.39%	-1,031	-30.97%	3,329
Le Flore	3,364	31.60%	6,864	64.49%	377	3.54%	39	0.37%	-3,500	-32.88%	10,644
Lincoln	3,795	41.31%	3,956	43.07%	1,339	14.58%	96	1.05%	-161	-1.75%	9,186
Logan	3,903	42.09%	3,905	42.11%	1,386	14.95%	79	0.85%	-2	-0.02%	9,273
Love	1,036	41.24%	1,384	55.10%	61	2.43%	31	1.23%	-348	-13.85%	2,512
Major	1,873	57.68%	1,020	31.41%	293	9.02%	61	1.88%	853	26.27%	3,247
Marshall	1,494	37.45%	2,395	60.04%	71	1.78%	29	0.73%	-901	-22.59%	3,989
Mayes	4,917	46.51%	4,820	45.60%	405	3.83%	429	4.06%	97	0.92%	10,571
McClain	2,753	40.99%	3,170	47.20%	734	10.93%	59	0.88%	-417	-6.21%	6,716
McCurtain	2,412	34.36%	4,498	64.07%	89	1.27%	21	0.30%	-2,086	-29.72%	7,020
McIntosh	2,067	37.07%	3,292	59.04%	144	2.58%	73	1.31%	-1,225	-21.97%	5,576
Murray	1,619	36.82%	2,440	55.49%	297	6.75%	41	0.93%	-821	-18.67%	4,397
Muskogee	8,772	46.89%	9,155	48.94%	546	2.92%	235	1.26%	-383	-2.05%	18,708
Noble	2,161	50.06%	1,734	40.17%	376	8.71%	46	1.07%	427	9.89%	4,317
Nowata	1,528	43.37%	1,867	52.99%	84	2.38%	44	1.25%	-339	-9.62%	3,523
Okfuskee	1,176	36.51%	1,832	56.88%	180	5.59%	33	1.02%	-656	-20.37%	3,221
Oklahoma	75,811	49.13%	59,176	38.35%	18,262	11.84%	1,047	0.68%	16,635	10.78%	154,296
Okmulgee	5,198	44.94%	5,581	48.25%	399	3.45%	388	3.35%	-383	-3.31%	11,566
Osage	5,369	45.48%	5,764	48.83%	457	3.87%	215	1.82%	-395	-3.35%	11,805
Ottawa	3,865	39.02%	5,819	58.74%	172	1.74%	50	0.50%	-1,954	-19.73%	9,906
Pawnee	2,705	50.09%	2,288	42.37%	280	5.19%	127	2.35%	417	7.72%	5,400
Payne	10,317	54.36%	7,119	37.51%	1,364	7.19%	180	0.95%	3,198	16.85%	18,980
Pittsburg	4,721	36.24%	7,604	58.37%	624	4.79%	78	0.60%	-2,883	-22.13%	13,027
Pontotoc	5,340	42.01%	6,347	49.93%	928	7.30%	97	0.76%	-1,007	-7.92%	12,712
Pottawatomie	7,010	39.63%	8,889	50.25%	1,662	9.40%	129	0.73%	-1,879	-10.62%	17,690
Pushmataha	1,170	31.54%	2,404	64.82%	121	3.26%	14	0.38%	-1,234	-33.27%	3,709
Roger Mills	828	45.30%	904	49.45%	82	4.49%	14	0.77%	-76	-4.16%	1,828
Rogers	8,458	52.86%	6,341	39.63%	701	4.38%	500	3.13%	2,117	13.23%	16,000
Seminole	2,900	35.69%	4,788	58.93%	394	4.85%	43	0.53%	-1,888	-23.24%	8,125
Sequoyah	3,504	36.47%	5,673	59.05%	356	3.71%	74	0.77%	-2,169	-22.58%	9,607
Stephens	5,036	33.41%	8,935	59.28%	999	6.63%	102	0.68%	-3,899	-25.87%	15,072
Texas	3,147	61.31%	1,756	34.21%	202	3.94%	28	0.55%	1,391	27.10%	5,133
Tillman	1,017	32.43%	2,010	64.09%	88	2.81%	21	0.67%	-993	-31.66%	3,136
Tulsa	88,096	60.20%	47,911	32.74%	5,722	3.91%	4,611	3.15%	40,185	27.46%	146,340
Wagoner	6,344	50.82%	5,166	41.38%	523	4.19%	451	3.61%	1,178	9.44%	12,484
Washington	9,967	59.77%	6,182	37.07%	352	2.11%	174	1.04%	3,785	22.70%	16,675
Washita	1,311	30.48%	2,750	63.94%	209	4.86%	31	0.72%	-1,439	-33.46%	4,301
Woods	2,262	52.79%	1,697	39.60%	276	6.44%	50	1.17%	565	13.19%	4,285
Woodward	3,600	51.95%	2,686	38.76%	587	8.47%	57	0.82%	914	13.19%	6,930
Totals	431,762	47.45%	405,295	44.54%	60,115	6.61%	12,753	1.40%	26,467	2.91%	909,925

==== Counties that flipped from Democratic to Republican ====
- Alfalfa
- Beaver
- Blaine
- Canadian
- Cherokee
- Cimarron
- Cleveland
- Creek
- Custer
- Ellis
- Garfield
- Grant
- Harper
- Kay
- Kingfisher
- Major
- Mayes
- Noble
- Oklahoma
- Pawnee
- Payne
- Rogers
- Texas
- Tulsa
- Wagoner
- Washington
- Woods
- Woodward
