= 1992 United States Senate election in Oklahoma =

- November 3, 1992
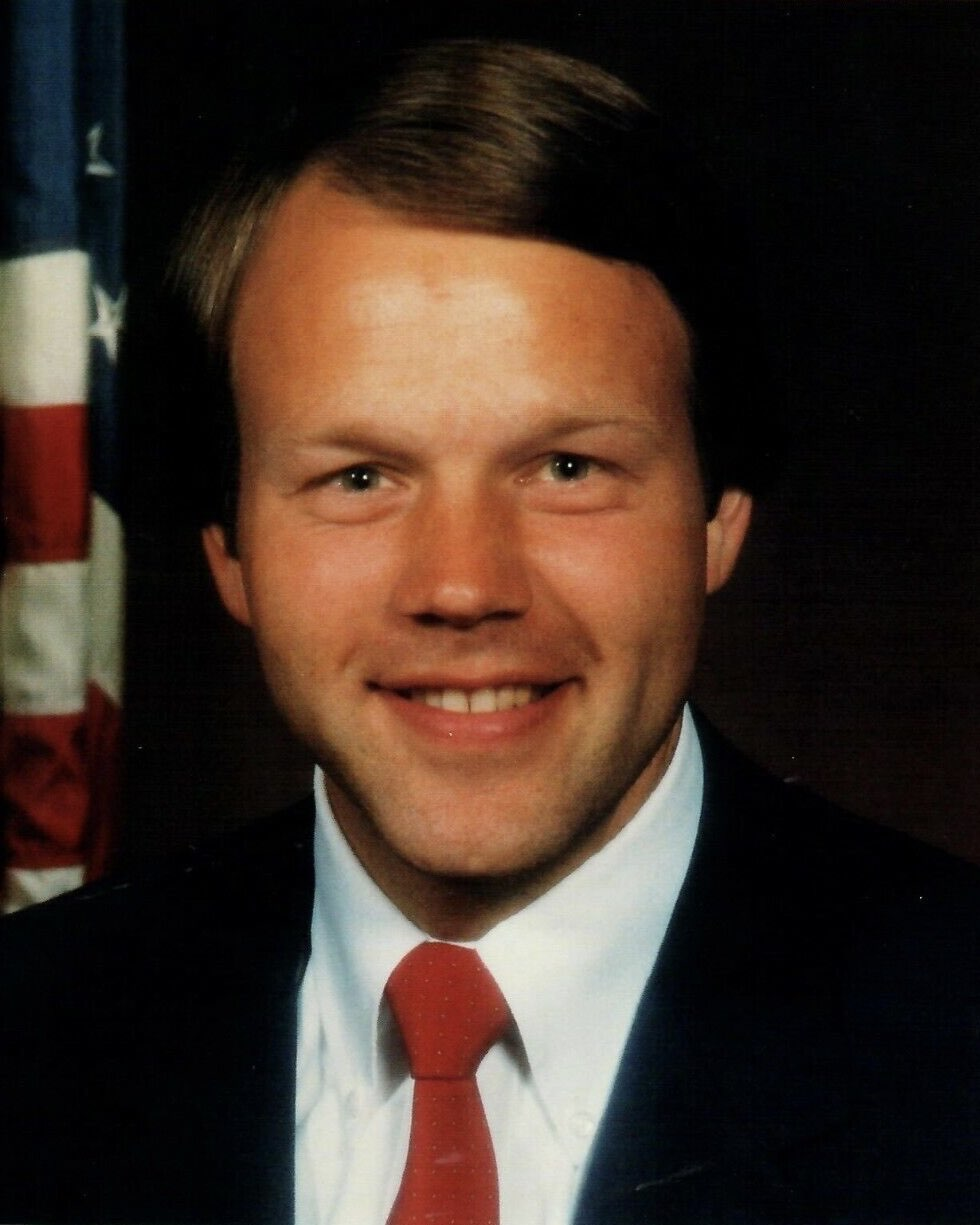

Nominee	Don Nickles	Steve Lewis
Party	Republican	Democratic
Popular vote	757,876	494,350
Percentage	58.55%	38.19%
- County results Nickles: 40–50% 50–60% 60–70% 70–80% Lewis: 40–50% 50–60%
U.S. senator before election
Don Nickles
Republican
Elected U.S. Senator
Don Nickles
Republican

The 1992 United States Senate election in Oklahoma was held November 3, 1992. Incumbent Republican U.S. Senator Don Nickles won re-election to his third term.

== Major candidates ==
=== Democratic ===
- Steve Lewis, former Speaker of the Oklahoma House of Representatives

=== Republican ===
- Don Nickles, incumbent U.S. Senator

== Results ==
1992 Oklahoma U.S. Senate Election
Party	Candidate	Votes	%
Republican	Don Nickles (incumbent)	757,876	58.55%
Democratic	Steve Lewis	494,350	38.19%
Independent	Roy V. Edwards	21,225	1.64%
Independent	Thomas D. Ledgerwood II	20,972	1.62%
Total votes		1,294,423	100.00%
Republican hold			

== See also ==
- 1992 United States Senate elections
