= The Cry Baby Killer =

1958 film

- Theatrical release poster
- Directed by: Joe Addis
- Written by: Leo Gordon; Melvin Levy
- Produced by: Roger Corman; David Kramarsky; David March
- Starring: Harry Lauter; Jack Nicholson; Carolyn Mitchell
- Cinematography: Floyd Crosby
- Edited by: Irene Morra
- Music by: Gerald Fried
- Distributed by: Allied Artists Pictures Corporation
- Release date: August 17, 1958
- Running time: 61 minutes
- Country: United States
- Language: English

The Cry Baby Killer is a 1958 teen exploitation film produced by Roger Corman that marked Jack Nicholson's film debut. The film was out of print and difficult to find until 2006, when it was issued on DVD for the first time by Buena Vista Home Entertainment as part of its Roger Corman Classics series.

== Plot ==
After Jimmy Wallace is beaten by Manny Cole and his friends over Carole, Jimmy confronts him and challenges him to a fight outside the café; during a struggle, Jimmy grabs a gun from one of Manny's friends and two gunshots ring out. A nearby police officer corners Jimmy, who then rushes into a room and takes a worker and a mother with her baby hostage. After a prolonged and tense hostage situation, Carole begs Jimmy to come out, who then does, surrendering himself to the police and releasing the hostages.

== Cast ==
- Harry Lauter as Police Lt. Porter
- Jack Nicholson as Jimmy Wallace
- Carolyn Mitchell as Carole Fields
- Brett Halsey as Manny Cole
- Lynn Cartwright as Julie
- Barbara Knudson as Mrs. Maxton
- William A. Forester as Carl Maxton
- John Shay as Police Officer Gannon
- Ralph Reed as Joey
- Bill Erwin as Mr. Wallace
- Ed Nelson as Rick Connor
- Smoki Whitfield as Sam
- John Weed as Police Sgt. Reed
- Frank Richards as Pete Gambelli

== Production ==
Corman was required to make a film under his deal with Allied Artists. He had a script from Leo Gordon and was going to direct it. The story, which came from Gordon, was based on a real life siege at a cafe in Inglewood. "It was a very nice little script," said Corman.

Corman says AIP then asked him to do a location scout in Australia, so he decided to just executive produce the film; the producers were David Kramarsky and David March and the director would be Justus Addis.

Jack Nicholson was cast at the recommendation of his acting teacher Jeff Corey. Corman claimed that he cast Nicholson and the producer did know the actor from Corey's class, but Kamarsky claimed he is the one who cast Nicholson, although Corman approved it.

Corman went overseas and said much of the script was changed by Kamarsky. Corman returned to Hollywood two days before filming began and tried to reverse the changes, but was only partially successful. Filming started 14 October 1957. Melvin Levy was brought on to do last minute rewrites. Corman supervised post production and has a cameo.

== Reception ==
Corman later claimed that The Cry Baby Killer was the first film that he produced that didn't return a profit, although he said that it earned back its budget from TV sales.

Variety felt "there isn't much depth."

Films and Filming wrote the film "is worth rather more attention than the average “‘ exploitation” “B” picture, it is not for any merit in the handling. The production values are almost non-existent, the acting makeshift and the overall treatment rough and ready. Two things make Cry Baby Killer, unlike its predecessors, notable: the story, which is concise and unpretentious, and a strongly humane attitude. Its violence, in other words springs from and illuminates the theme."

Sight and Sound called it "an awkward, amateurish production with a compelling situation... A sortof Juvenile Fourteen Hours, in fact. The killer himself looks like an uncaricatured version of Jerry Lewis. He is clearly infantile, but dangerous."

Nicholson later said after he was cast he thought "This is it! I'm here! I'm gonna be big! Then I didn't even get an interview for the next year. Cry Baby Killer was humiliating but good for me."

Corman said "the finished film is less than inspiring, although Jack is very good."
