= Mike Turpen =

American lawyer (born 1949)

Member of the Oklahoma State Regents for Higher Education
- Incumbent
- Assumed office 2009
- Preceded by: Cheryl P. Hunter

13th Attorney General of Oklahoma
- In office 1983–1987
- Governor: George Nigh
- Preceded by: Jan Eric Cartwright
- Succeeded by: Robert Harlan Henry

District Attorney for Muskogee County, Oklahoma
- In office 1977–1983
- Succeeded by: Drew Edmondson

Personal details
- Born: November 10, 1949 (age 77) Tulsa, Oklahoma, U.S.
- Party: Democratic
- Education: University of Tulsa (BS, JD)

Michael Craig Turpen (born November 10, 1949) is an American lawyer and politician from Oklahoma. A member of the Democratic Party, Turpen served as the chairman of the Oklahoma Democratic Party and as the attorney general of Oklahoma from 1983 to 1987. After leaving the Attorney General's Office, Turpen entered private practice.

Turpen was appointed by Governor of Oklahoma Brad Henry in 2009 to serve as member of the Oklahoma State Regents for Higher Education. Turpen's nine-year term expired in May 2018.

== Biography ==
Mike Turpen was born in Tulsa, Oklahoma, where he attended Tulsa Public Schools. After high school, Turpen attended and graduated from the University of Tulsa, where he earned a Bachelor of Science in history in 1972. In 1974, he received his Juris Doctor Degree from the University of Tulsa College of Law.

=== Public service ===
Following law school, Turpen moved to Muskogee, Oklahoma, where he joined the Muskogee Police Department as the Police Legal Advisor. He then joined the Muskogee County District Attorney's Office where he would serve as the Chief Prosecutor and then as the First Assistant District Attorney. In 1976, Turpen was elected, as a Democrat, as the District Attorney for Muskogee County. He served in that position until 1983.

In 1982, Turpen became the Democratic nominee for Attorney General of Oklahoma. Turpen defeated his Republican opponent and entered office in 1983. He served in that position until 1987 when he declined to seek reelection to run for Governor of Oklahoma in 1986. Though initially considered the front runner in the race to seek the Democratic Party's nomination, Turpen ultimately lost the nomination to dark horse candidate David Walters. Walters, in turn, was defeated by former Republican governor Henry Bellmon.

=== Private practice and continuing civic involvement ===
Since leaving public service in 1987, Turpen has been a partner in the law firm of Riggs, Abney, Neal, Turpen, Orbison and Lewis in Oklahoma City. In 2009, Turpen was appointed by Democratic Governor of Oklahoma Brad Henry to serve as member of the Oklahoma State Regents for Higher Education. Turpen's nine-year term will expire in May 2018.Mike was reappointed to serve another nine-year term on the Oklahoma State Regents for High Education in May 2018 by then Governor Mary Fallin.

2010 Oklahoma Hall of Fame inductees are: Kristin Chenoweth, Broken Arrow; Robert A. Hefner, III, Oklahoma City; Edward Keller, Tulsa; Judy Love, Oklahoma City; Michael C. Turpen, Oklahoma City; and Lew O. Ward, III, Enid. The honorees will be formally inducted to the Hall on Nov 4 at the Cox Convention Center in Oklahoma City. Also in November, their portraits will be added to the Oklahoma Hall of Fame Gallery at the Gaylord-Pickens Oklahoma Heritage Museum. Their biographies, photos and fun facts will be accessed through touch screen computers in the same gallery.

Political offices
Preceded by	District Attorney for Muskogee County, Oklahoma; 1977–1983	Succeeded by Drew Edmondson
Preceded by Jan Eric Cartwright	Attorney General of Oklahoma; 1983–1987	Succeeded by Robert Harlan Henry
Preceded by Cheryl P. Hunter	Member of the Oklahoma State Regents for Higher Education; 2009–present	Incumbent
Party political offices
Preceded by Jan Eric Cartwright	Democratic nominee for Attorney General of Oklahoma; 1982	Succeeded by Robert Harlan Henry
