= Tombstone Territory =

American Western television series (1957–1960)

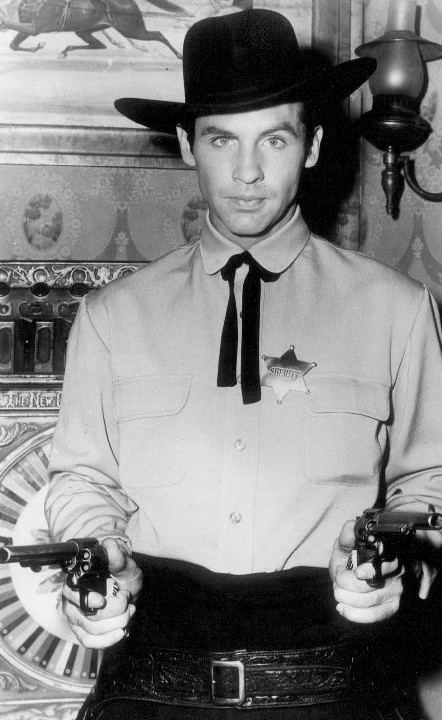
- Pat Conway as Clay Hollister, 1958
- Genre: Western
- Starring: Pat Conway; Richard Eastham; Gilman Rankin; Quentin Sondergaard
- Narrated by: Richard Eastham
- Theme music composer: William M. Backer
- Opening theme: "Whistle Me Up a Memory" performed by Jimmy Blaine
- Country of origin: United States
- Original language: English
- No. of seasons: 3
- No. of episodes: 91

Production
- Executive producer: Frederick W. Ziv
- Producers: Frank Pittman; Andy White
- Cinematography: Monroe P. Askins; Curt Fetters; Robert Hoffman
- Editors: W. Duncan Mansfield; Joseph Silver
- Running time: 30 minutes
- Production company: Ziv Television Programs

Original release
- Network: ABC (1957–1959); Syndication (1959–1960)
- Release: October 16, 1957 – July 8, 1960

Tombstone Territory is an American Western television series starring Pat Conway, Richard Eastham, Gilman Rankin and Quentin Sondergaard. The first two seasons aired on ABC from 1957 to 1959. The first season was sponsored by Bristol-Myers (consumer products) and the second season by Lipton (tea/soup) and Philip Morris (Marlboro cigarettes). The third and final season aired in syndication from 1959 until 1960. The program was produced by Ziv Television.

== Overview ==
This program took place in the boomtown of Tombstone, Arizona Territory, one of the Old West's most notorious towns and the site of the shootout known as the Gunfight at the O.K. Corral. Located south of Tucson, Tombstone was then known by the sobriquet "the town too tough to die". The program's theme song, "Whistle Me Up a Memory", was written by William M. Backer and performed by Jimmy Blaine.

The series did not deal with real characters in the history of Tombstone in the 1880s, such as Wyatt Earp, Doc Holliday, or the Clanton gang, with the exception of Curly Bill Brocius, who appeared in the first season. It was about fictional characters in the American Southwest. The first episode opens, according to the narrator, on August 4, 1881. Conway played Sheriff Clay Hollister. Eastham, the only other actor besides Conway to appear in all the episodes, played Harris Claibourne, editor of The Tombstone Epitaph (an actual newspaper that still exists in limited form). Eastham, originally a singer in opera and on Broadway, also narrated the series in a deep baritone voice, describing each episode as an actual report from the newspaper's archives.

Gerald Mohr played Doc Holliday in the first-season Tombstone Territory episode titled "Doc Holliday in Durango", initially broadcast in 1958. The previous year, Mohr had portrayed Holliday in an episode of Maverick titled "The Quick and the Dead" starring James Garner and Marie Windsor. Mohr's version of Holliday was identical in both series.

The ending credits indicate, "This series is produced with the full cooperation of Clayton A. Smith, editor of the TOMBSTONE EPITAPH and D'Estell Iszard, historian".

The program was a notable early example of a television network imitating itself. At the time it was airing Tombstone Territory, whose main character resembled Wyatt Earp in everything but name, ABC also was broadcasting The Life and Legend of Wyatt Earp.

== Cast ==
- Pat Conway as Sheriff Clay Hollister
- Richard Eastham as Harris Clayton Claibourne, editor
- Gilman Rankin as Deputy Charlie Riggs in eight episodes, only appearing in the first season.
- Quentin Sondergaard as Deputy Sheriff Quint, who appeared as a recurring character in season 1, but appeared throughout the series (mainly season 3).

=== Recurring ===
- Robert Foulk appeared as Curly Bill Brocius.
- Dennis Moore appeared as Deputy Lee in 6 episodes.
- Harry Woods appeared as Dr. Cunningham in 6 episodes (seasons 1 & 3)
- Robert J. Wilke, John Doucette and Warren Oates all appeared three times, as Burt Foster, Apache Chief Geronimo, and Bob Pickett, respectively, as well as occasional other roles. Kenne Duncan appeared three times as a Tombstone bartender.

=== Guest stars ===
- Fred Aldrich
- John Anderson
- Robert Anderson
- Rayford Barnes
- James Best
- Peter Breck
- Diane Brewster
- Harry Carey Jr.
- John Carradine
- Anthony Caruso
- Lon Chaney Jr.
- James Coburn
- Fred Coby
- William Conrad
- Russ Conway
- Elisha Cook Jr.
- Angie Dickinson
- Andrew Duggan
- Jack Elam
- Bill Erwin
- Don Eitner
- Margaret Field
- Duke Fishman
- Constance Ford
- Bruce Gordon
- Leo Gordon
- Dabbs Greer
- Virginia Gregg
- Raymond Guth
- Herman Hack
- Ron Hagerthy
- Alan Hale Jr.
- Allison Hayes
- Ron Hayes
- Myron Healey
- Thomas Browne Henry
- Robert Hinkle
- Ed Hinton
- Bern Hoffman
- Rodolfo Hoyos Jr.
- Anthony Jochim
- Ray Jones
- Don Kennedy
- Douglas Kennedy
- Brett King
- Wright King
- Ethan Laidlaw
- Michael Landon
- Keith Larsen
- Harry Lauter
- Len Lesser
- Karl Lukas
- Wayne Mallory
- Ken Mayer
- Rod McGaughy
- Patrick McVey
- Tyler McVey
- Joyce Meadows
- Jan Merlin
- Gerald Mohr
- Donald Murphy
- Anna Navarro
- Ed Nelson
- Leonard Nimoy
- Jimmy Noel
- Kathleen Nolan
- Larry Pennell
- William Phipps
- Mala Powers
- Andrew Prine
- Denver Pyle
- Mike Ragan
- Rhodes Reason
- Richard Reeves
- Jack Reitzen
- Paul Richards
- Pernell Roberts
- Bing Russell
- Milan Smith
- George Sowards
- Fay Spain
- Guy Stockwell
- Brick Sullivan
- Liam Sullivan
- Ralph Taeger
- Kent Taylor
- Robert Tetrick
- Regis Toomey
- Brad Trumbull
- Lee Van Cleef
- John Vivyan
- Patrick Waltz
- Alan Wells
- Peter Whitney
- Tony Young

== Episode list ==
=== Season 1 (1957–58) ===
No. overall	No. in series	Title	Directed by	Written by	Original release date
1	1	"Gunslinger from Galeyville"	Eddie Davis	Story by : Frank Pittman and Andy White; Teleplay by : Andy White	October 16, 1957
2	2	"Reward for a Gunslinger"	Leon Benson	Stuart Jerome	October 23, 1957
3	3	"Ride Out at Noon"	Leon Benson	Clark E. Reynolds and Martin Berkeley	October 30, 1957
4	4	"Revenge Town"	Eddie Davis	Steve Fisher	November 6, 1957
5	5	"A Bullet for an Editor"	Walter Doniger	Leo Gordon	November 13, 1957
6	6	"Killer Without a Conscience"	Walter Doniger	William Tunberg	November 20, 1957
7	7	"Guns of Silver"	Eddie Davis	Fred Freiberger	November 27, 1957
8	8	"Desert Survival"	Eddie Davis	Gene Levitt	December 4, 1957
9	9	"Apache Vendetta"	Walter Doniger	Andy White	December 11, 1957
10	10	"Ambush at Gila Gulch"	Leon Benson	William Tunberg	December 18, 1957
11	11	"Sermons and Six Guns"	Walter Doniger	Laurence Heath	December 25, 1957
12	12	"The Youngest Gun"	Leon Benson	Harold Shumate	January 1, 1958
13	13	"Shoot Out at Dark"	Eddie Davis	Martin Berkeley and Clark E. Reynolds	January 8, 1958
14	14	"The Rebels' Last Charge"	Eddie Davis	Steve Fisher	January 15, 1958
15	15	"Gun Fever"	Eddie Davis	Barney Slater	January 22, 1958
16	16	"Mexican Bandito"	Ted Post	Paul Savage	January 29, 1958
17	17	"Tong War"	Eddie Davis	Leo Gordon	February 5, 1958
18	18	"Postmarked for Death"	Ted Post	Martin Berkeley and Clark E. Reynolds	February 12, 1958
19	19	"Johnny Ringo's Last Ride"	Ted Post	Story by : Andy White; Teleplay by : Sam Peckinpah	February 19, 1958
20	20	"Outlaw's Bugle"	Walter Doniger	Laurence Heath	February 26, 1958
21	21	"Geronimo"	Harold D. Schuster	Story by : Andy White; Teleplay by : Leo Gordon	March 5, 1958
22	22	"The Return of the Outlaw"	Walter Doniger	Barney Slater	March 12, 1958
23	23	"Guilt of a Town"	Norman Foster	Story by : Frank Pittman and Andy White; Teleplay by : Andy White	March 19, 1958
24	24	"Cave-In"	Walter Doniger	Story by : Andy White; Teleplay by : Gene Levitt	March 26, 1958
25	25	"Skeleton Canyon Massacre"	Christian Nyby	Robert C. Bennett	April 2, 1958
26	26	"Strange Vengeance"	Christian Nyby	Don Brinkley	April 9, 1958
27	27	"The Tin Gunman"	Walter Doniger	Warren Douglas	April 16, 1958
28	28	"The Outcasts"	Tom Gries	Tom Gries	April 23, 1958
29	29	"Doc Holliday in Durango"	Richard L. Bare	Gene Levitt, Frank Pittman, and Andy White	April 30, 1958
30	30	"Triangle of Death"	Henry S. Kesler	Paul Savage	May 7, 1958
31	31	"Pick up the Gun"	Walter Doniger	Maurice Tombragel	May 14, 1958
32	32	"The Assassin"	Tom Gries	Fred Friedberger	May 21, 1958
33	33	"The Lady Gambler"	Walter Doniger	William Driskill	May 28, 1958
34	34	"Fight for a Fugitive"	Paul Guilfoyle	Barney Slater	June 4, 1958
35	35	"Legacy of Death"	Tom Gries	Milton S. Gelman	June 11, 1958
36	36	"The Gatling Gun"	Richard L. Bare	David Lang	August 27, 1958
37	37	"The Black Marshal from Deadwood"	Christian Nyby	James Edmiston	September 3, 1958
38	38	"Thicker Than Water"	Walter Doniger	Leo Gordon	September 10, 1958
39	39	"Rose of the Rio Bravo"	Walter Doniger	Andy White	September 17, 1958

=== Season 2 (1959) ===
No. overall	No. in series	Title	Directed by	Written by	Original release date
40	1	"Whipsaw"	Richard L. Bare	Bret Hill	March 13, 1959
41	2	"Marked for Murder"	William Conrad	Barney Slater	March 20, 1959
42	3	"Payroll to Tombstone"	Richard L. Bare	D.D. Beauchamp	March 27, 1959
43	4	"Day of the Amnesty"	Richard L. Bare	Don Ingalls	April 3, 1959
44	5	"Trail's End"	Otto Lang	Martin Berkeley and Clarke Reynolds	April 10, 1959
45	6	"The Black Diamond"	William Conrad	Melvin Levy	April 17, 1959
46	7	"The Man from Brewster"	Richard L. Bare	Guy de Vry	April 24, 1959
47	8	"Gun Hostage"	Eddie Davis	Jim Carling and Martin Mooney	May 1, 1959
48	9	"Warrant for Death"	Richard L. Bare	Turnley Walker	May 8, 1959
49	10	"Surrender at Sunglow"	Richard L. Bare	Harold Shumate	May 15, 1959
50	11	"Grave Near Tombstone"	Lew Landers	John Elliotte	May 22, 1959
51	12	"Death Is to Write About"	Otto Lang	Leo Gordon	May 29, 1959

=== Season 3 (1959–60) ===
No. overall	No. in series	Title	Directed by	Written by	Original release date
52	1	"Red Terror of Tombstone"	Eddie Davis	Andy White	October 9, 1959
53	2	"The Gunfighter"	Eddie Davis	Guy de Vry	October 16, 1959
54	3	"Stolen Loot"	Franklin Adreon	Stephen Kandel	October 23, 1959
55	4	"The Writer"	Alan Crosland Jr.	John W. Krafft	October 30, 1959
56	5	"Payroll Robbery"	Eddie Davis	William Tunberg	November 6, 1959
57	6	"The Horse Thief"	Eddie Davis	Virginia M. Cooke	November 13, 1959
58	7	"The Legend"	Otto Lang	Wells Root and Ron Bishop	November 20, 1959
59	8	"Premature Obituary"	Eddie Davis	Paul Franklin	November 27, 1959
60	9	"Dangerous Romance"	Otto Lang	Barney Slater	December 4, 1959
61	10	"Self-Defense"	Franklin Adreon	Stuart Jerome	December 11, 1959
62	11	"The Marked Horseshoe"	Herman Hoffman	Jim Carling and Martin Mooney	December 18, 1959
63	12	"The Noose That Broke"	Alan Crosland Jr.	Stuart Jerome	December 25, 1959
64	13	"Mine Disasters"	Franklin Adreon	S.H. Barnett and Fran van Hartesveldt	January 1, 1960
65	14	"The Witness"	James Goldstone	Barney Slater	January 8, 1960
66	15	"The Capture"	Eddie Davis	Barney Slater	January 15, 1960
67	16	"State's Witness"	Lew Landers	Teddi Sherman	January 22, 1960
68	17	"The Target"	James Goldstone	Dave Clay	January 29, 1960
69	18	"The Bride"	Otto Lang	Robert Turner	February 5, 1960
70	19	"Female Killer"	James Goldstone	Leo Gordon	February 12, 1960
71	20	"The Lady Lawyer"	Jack Herzberg	Teddi Sherman	February 19, 1960
72	21	"Silver Killers"	William Conrad	Joe Richardson	February 26, 1960
73	22	"Holcomb Brothers"	Otto Lang	Paul Franklin	March 4, 1960
74	23	"Young Killer"	James Goldstone	S.H. Barnett and Fran van Hartesveldt	March 11, 1960
75	24	"Coded Newspaper"	James Goldstone	S.H. Barnett, Marion Parsonnet, and Fran van Hartesveldt	March 18, 1960
76	25	"Memory"	William Conrad	Robert Turner	March 25, 1960
77	26	"Revenge"	Eddie Davis	Stuart Jerome	April 1, 1960
78	27	"The Hostage"	Franklin Adreon	Vernon E. Clark	April 8, 1960
79	28	"The Governor"	William Conrad	Ron Bishop and Wells Root	April 16, 1960
80	29	"The Kidnapping"	Eddie Davis	Stuart Jerome	April 22, 1960
81	30	"Girl from Philadelphia"	Herman Hoffman	Ron Bishop and Wells Root	April 29, 1960
82	31	"The Fortune"	James Goldstone	Guy de Vry	May 6, 1960
83	32	"The Innocent Man"	Alan Crosland Jr.	Guy de Vry	May 13, 1960
84	33	"The Siesta Killer"	David Friedkin	Lee Berg	May 20, 1960
85	34	"The Return of Kansas Joe"	Franklin Adreon	William Tunberg	May 27, 1960
86	35	"Betrayal"	William Conrad	Guy de Vry	June 3, 1960
87	36	"The Treaty"	Eddie Davis	Guy de Vry	June 10, 1960
88	37	"The Outlaw"	James Goldstone	Mikhail Rykoff	June 17, 1960
89	38	"The Injury"	Eddie Davis	Don Brinkley	June 24, 1960
90	39	"Crime Epidemic"	Herman Hoffman	Melvin Levy	July 1, 1960
91	40	"Juan Diego"	Franklin Adreon	Leo Gordon	July 8, 1960

== Release ==
=== Home media ===
On April 2, 2013, Timeless Media Group released season 1 on DVD in Region 1.

As of late 2014, The Complete Series of all 91 episodes has been released on DVD.

=== Syndication ===
Reruns aired on FETV from 2021 to 2022, and as of 2022, the show is aired daily on Grit as a part of its daytime schedule.

=== Merchandising ===
The TV show was also adapted into a comic book, Four Color #1123 (Jun. 1960), by Dan Spiegle and Paul S. Newman, published & distributed by Dell Comics.
