= Jimmy Noel =

American actor, musician and stuntman

- Noel (right) with Douglas Fowley in The Life and Legend of Wyatt Earp, 1957
- Born: Herbert James Noel; May 15, 1903; Haverhill, Massachusetts, U.S.
- Died: January 31, 1985 (aged 81); Los Angeles, California, U.S.
- Occupations: Actor, musician, stuntman
- Years active: 1933–1981
- Spouse(s): DeLories Ziegfeld (1933 - ?); Dawn Hope

Herbert James Noel (May 15, 1903 – January 31, 1985) was an American actor, musician and stuntman.

== Life and career ==
Noel was born in Haverhill, Massachusetts. He was guitarist and singer with the trio The Rhythm Boys. He decided to leave the trio in 1935. After leaving, he worked as a police officer in Chicago, Illinois. He later moved to California, where he began his film and television career.

In 1938, Noel had his own band and appeared 12 times a week on radio. He played banjo, drums, guitar, and piano.

Noel's film career began with the 1944 film The Big Bonanza. He then appeared in the 1945 film Colorado Pioneers. He made numerous appearances in films such as Border Saddlemates, Ride the Man Down, The Oklahoman, Man from Del Rio, The Rawhide Years, The Fighting Chance, North to Alaska (with John Wayne), The Brass Legend and Masterson of Kansas.

Noel began appearing on television in 1953, initially in the television series The Gene Autry Show, where he made at least eleven appearances. He then appeared in the action and adventure television series Sergeant Preston of the Yukon. He made over 200 appearances in the American western television series Gunsmoke, in which he also served as the double for Milburn Stone as Doc. He made numerous appearances in the television programs Bonanza, Tales of Wells Fargo, Wagon Train, Death Valley Days, The Rifleman, Bat Masterson, The Deputy, Tombstone Territory and Johnny Ringo. He also made at least 140 appearances in The Life and Legend of Wyatt Earp.

== Personal life and death ==
Noel married DeLories Ziegfeld on November 7, 1933, in Cambridge, Massachusetts. He was also married to Dawn Hope. That marriage ended with her death in 1939.

Noel died on January 31, 1985 in Los Angeles, California, at the age of 81.
