= Wilburn Cartwright =

American politician

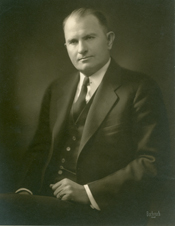

Oklahoma Corporation Commissioner
- In office January 10, 1955 – January 8, 1973
- Governor: Raymond D. Gary; J. Howard Edmondson; George Nigh; Henry Bellmon; Dewey F. Bartlett; David Hall
- Preceded by: Reford Bond
- Succeeded by: Rex Privett

13th Oklahoma State Auditor
- In office January 8, 1951 – July 10, 1954
- Governor: Johnston Murray
- Preceded by: A. S. J. Shaw
- Succeeded by: Gladys Warren

14th Oklahoma Secretary of State
- In office January 13, 1947 – January 8, 1951
- Governor: Roy J. Turner
- Preceded by: Kathrine Manton
- Succeeded by: John D. Conner

Chairman of the Committee on Roads
- In office March 4, 1933 – January 3, 1943
- Preceded by: Edward B. Almon
- Succeeded by: J. W. Robinson

Member of the U.S. House of Representatives from Oklahoma's 3rd district
- In office March 4, 1927 – January 3, 1943
- Preceded by: Charles D. Carter
- Succeeded by: Paul Stewart

Member of the Oklahoma Senate from the 20th district
- In office 1918–1922
- Preceded by: John R. Hickman
- Succeeded by: Thomas F. Memminger

Member of the Oklahoma House of Representatives from the Coal County district
- In office 1914–1918
- Preceded by: George T. Searcy
- Succeeded by: F. Brinkworth

Personal details
- Born: January 12, 1892 Georgetown, Tennessee, U.S.
- Died: March 14, 1979 (aged 87) Oklahoma City, Oklahoma
- Party: Democratic
- Spouse: Carrie Staggs
- Children: 2, including Lynn Cartwright
- Parent: Jackson Robert Cartwright (father)
- Education: State Teachers College; University of Oklahoma College of Law; University of Chicago
- Occupation: Teacher; lawyer; politician

Military service
- Allegiance: United States
- Branch: United States Army
- Service years: 1943–1945
- Rank: Major
- Conflict: World War II

Wilburn Cartwright (January 12, 1892 – March 14, 1979) was an American lawyer, educator, politician, and United States Army officer in World War II. The town of Cartwright, Oklahoma is named after him. He self-styled himself "the most elected man in Oklahoma government" and served in elected office in both the Oklahoma House of Representatives and the Oklahoma Senate, as a school superintendent, United States House of Representatives member for Oklahoma's 3rd congressional district, Oklahoma Secretary of State, Oklahoma State Auditor, and on the Oklahoma Corporation Commission.

== Early life ==
Born on a farm near Georgetown, Tennessee, Cartwright moved with his parents to the Chickasaw Nation, Indian Territory, in 1903. He attended the public schools at Wapanucka and Ada, Oklahoma, and State Teachers College at Durant, Oklahoma.

== Early career ==
As an educator he taught in the schools of Coal, Atoka, Bryan, and Pittsburg Counties in Oklahoma from 1914 to 1926. During World War I he served as a private in the Student Army Training Corps in 1917 and 1918. He studied law and was admitted to the bar in 1917. He was graduated from the law department of the University of Oklahoma at Norman in 1920. Afterwards he began a law practice in McAlester, Oklahoma. Additionally he took postgraduate work at the University of Chicago, Chicago, Illinois. He served as member of the Oklahoma House of Representatives from 1914 to 1918, and then as a member of the State Senate from 1918 until 1922. Cartwright was a vocational adviser for disabled veterans at McAlester, Oklahoma, in 1921 and 1922. He was an unsuccessful candidate for the Democratic nomination for Congress in 1922 and 1924, and served as Superintendent of schools at Krebs, Oklahoma from 1922 to 1926.

== Family ==
Wilburn's great-great uncle was Peter Cartwright, who had defeated Abraham Lincoln in an Illinois legislative race.

His two daughters were Wilburta May Cartwright and actress Lynn Cartwright.

His nephew, Jan Eric Cartwright, was the Oklahoma Attorney General from 1979 to 1983.

His siblings were Floyd, Gerty, McKinley, Shafter, Dewey, Cecil, Keith, and Clifford (Buck). The last two were also Oklahoma state legislators.

His father, Jackson Robert Cartwright, was a Baptist preacher and served in the Oklahoma House of Representatives in 1929 and 1931.

== United States Congress ==
Cartwright was elected as a Democrat to the Seventieth and to the seven succeeding Congresses. He served as chairman of the Committee on Roads (Seventy-third through Seventy-seventh Congresses). He was an unsuccessful candidate for renomination in 1942. Cartwright was a supporter of the New Deal public works projects in his district.

As a Congressman, he was one of the namesakes of the Hayden-Cartwright Act of 1934

== Military career ==
He served as a major in the United States Army, Allied Military Government, with service in Africa and Europe from 1943 until he was injured. He returned to the United States as an instructor at Fort Custer, Michigan, in 1945. He was employed with the Veterans' Administration at Muskogee, Oklahoma, in 1945 and 1946.

== Later life ==
Cartwright was elected to a single four year term as Secretary of State of Oklahoma in 1946 and State Auditor in 1950. In 1954, Cartwright resigned as Auditor to be appointed State corporation commissioner by Governor Johnston Murray, and was elected for a full six-year term later that year as well as in 1960 and 1966. In 1970 he attempted to win the nomination for Governor, but placed last in a field of four, only gaining an eighth of the vote in the Democratic primary. He was a resident of Oklahoma City, Oklahoma until his death there on March 14, 1979. He was interred in I.O.O.F. Cemetery, Norman, Oklahoma.

Party political offices
Preceded by Frank C. Carter	Democratic nominee for Oklahoma Secretary of State; 1946	Succeeded by John D. Conner
Preceded by A. S. J. Shaw	Democratic nominee for Auditor of Oklahoma; 1950	Succeeded by A. S. J. Shaw
U.S. House of Representatives
Preceded by Charles D. Carter	Member of the U.S. House of Representatives from Oklahoma's 3rd congressional district 1927–1943	Succeeded by Paul Stewart (politician)
