= Bill Brewster (American politician) =

American politician (1941–2022)

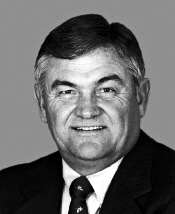

Member of the U.S. House of Representatives from Oklahoma's 3rd district
- In office January 3, 1991 – January 3, 1997
- Preceded by: Wes Watkins
- Succeeded by: Wes Watkins

Member of the Oklahoma House of Representatives from the 49th district
- In office 1983–1990
- Preceded by: W. D. Bradley
- Succeeded by: Fred Stanley

Personal details
- Born: November 8, 1941 Ardmore, Oklahoma, U.S.
- Died: October 3, 2022 (aged 80) Marietta, Oklahoma, U.S.
- Party: Democratic
- Spouse: Mary Sue "Suzie" Nelson Brewster
- Children: 3
- Education: Southwestern Oklahoma State University
- Profession: Pharmacist, rancher, politician

Military service
- Allegiance: United States
- Branch/service: United States Army
- Years of service: 1966–1971
- Unit: United States Army Reserve

William Kent Brewster (November 8, 1941 – October 3, 2022) was an American pharmacist and politician. A member of the Democratic Party, Brewster was a U.S. Congressman from Oklahoma's 3rd congressional district from 1991 to 1997 and served in the Oklahoma House of Representatives from 1983 to 1990.

== Early life ==
Brewster was born in Ardmore, Oklahoma, on November 8, 1941, the son of Grady Omar and Rachel Mayo Brewster. He attended public schools, graduating from Petrolia High School in Petrolia, Texas, and earned his Bachelor of Science in pharmacy from Southwestern Oklahoma State University in 1968. He was initiated into Tau Kappa Epsilon, and was a member of the United States Army Reserves from 1966 to 1971.

After college graduation, Brewster moved to Colleyville, Texas, where, as a licensed pharmacist, he owned and operated Colleyville Drug. In 1968, he also began a career as a cattleman and rancher when he started Brewster Angus Farms, as well as owning a real estate business. In 1977, Brewster settled in Marietta, Oklahoma.

== Entry into politics ==
In 1982, Brewster was elected to a seat in the Oklahoma House of Representatives for District 49. He was re-elected in 1984 and served until 1990.

In the 1990 elections, Brewster ran for an open seat in the U.S. House of Representatives (District 3—then Congressman Wes Watkins had decided to retire from Congress and run for Governor of Oklahoma). Brewster won the heavily contested Democratic nomination against Lieutenant Governor Robert S. Kerr III. He won the election to Congress in November 1990 in this heavily Democratic district (referred to as "Little Dixie"). He was re-elected in 1992 and then again in 1994, serving from January 3, 1991, to January 3, 1997.

== Retirement from Congress ==
In December 1995, Brewster announced that he would not run for reelection to Congress in 1996. He was mentioned as a possible Democratic candidate for governor in 1998, but declined to run for the nomination.

After he left Congress, Brewster joined R. Duffy Wall and Associates, a Washington, D.C., lobbying firm. In 2001, he served as president and chief operating officer of this firm. He was also chief executive officer and chairman of the Capitol Hill Consulting Group.

== Personal life ==
Brewster married Mary Sue "Suzie" Nelson in 1963, and the couple had three children: Balynda Karel, Betsy Kecia, and Bradley Kent. On January 31, 1990, Betsy Kecia and Bradley Kent died in a plane crash with friends of the family.

Brewster died on October 3, 2022, at the age of 80. He died at his home in Marietta following a battle with cancer.

U.S. House of Representatives
Preceded by Wes Watkins (D)	Member of the U.S. House of Representatives from Oklahoma's 3rd congressional district 1991–1997	Succeeded by Wes Watkins (R)
