= Keith Cartwright =

American politician (1911–1972)

Member of the Oklahoma Senate from the 20th district
- In office 1948–1960
- Preceded by: Bayless Irby
- Succeeded by: J. H. Belvin

Member of the Oklahoma House of Representatives Bryan County, Oklahoma
- In office 1946–1948
- Preceded by: William Parrish
- Succeeded by: Jack E. McGahey

Personal details
- Born: November 27, 1911
- Died: August 23, 1972 (aged 60)
- Party: Democratic
- Parent: Jackson Robert Cartwright (father)
- Relatives: Wilburn Cartwright (brother); Buck Cartwright (brother); Lynn Cartwright (niece); Jan Eric Cartwright (nephew)
- Education: University of Oklahoma College of Law

Military service
- Branch/service: United States Marine Corps
- Years of service: 1943 - 1946

Keith Cartwright was an American politician who served in the Oklahoma House of Representatives between 1946 and 1948 and the Oklahoma Senate between 1948 and 1960. He was the Democratic Party's nominee for Governor of Oklahoma in 1966.

== Early life and family ==
Keith Cartwright was born on November 27, 1911 in Wapanucka, Oklahoma to Jackson Robert Cartwright. He attended Southeastern State College. He had two brothers also active in Oklahoma politics: Wilburn Cartwright and Buck Cartwright.

Cartwright also served in the United States Marine Corps from June 1943 to January 1946.

== Oklahoma politics ==
Cartwright served in the Oklahoma House of Representatives between 1946 and 1948 and the Oklahoma Senate between 1948 and 1960. While in the Oklahoma Senate, he lived in Durant, Oklahoma and represented Bryan County. He chaired the senate committee on roads and highways. After supporting legislation for a state constitutional amendment referendum to repeal prohibition, he was banished from his Baptist church congregation. He also supported combatting county commissioner corruption by giving control of all road building money to the Oklahoma Highway Commission. The bill was opposed by county commissioners and the press before dying in committee. He lost his next reelection campaign.

He was a Democratic candidate for Governor of Oklahoma in the 1966 primary. He died August 23, 1972. He was married to Dorothy L. Wharton.

== Electoral history ==
1966 Oklahoma Governor Democratic primary results
Party	Candidate	Votes	%
Democratic	Raymond Gary	160,825	31.5%
Democratic	Preston J. Moore	104,081	20.4%
Democratic	David Hall	94,309	18.5%
Democratic	Cleeta John Rogers	71,248	13.9%
Democratic	Charles Nesbitt	26,546	5.2%
Democratic	Leland Gourley	19,898	3.9%
Democratic	Henry W. Ford	19,815	3.8%
Democratic	Keith Cartwright	5,291	1.0%
Democratic	Carmen Moe Marcus	2,568	0.5%
Democratic	Al J. Kavanaugh	1,647	0.3%
Democratic	Howard W. Joplin	1,330	0.2%
Democratic	Clifton Wood	1,116	0.2%
Democratic	Jack K. Gillespie	865	0.1%
Total votes		509,539	100.00%

== Works cited ==
- Harris, Fred (2024). Report From A Last Survivor. Albuquerque: University of New Mexico Press. ISBN 978-0-8263-6668-9.
