= 2002 United States Senate election in Oklahoma =

- November 5, 2002
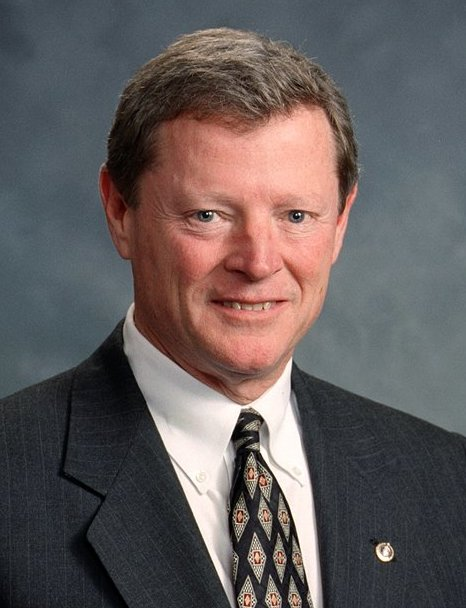

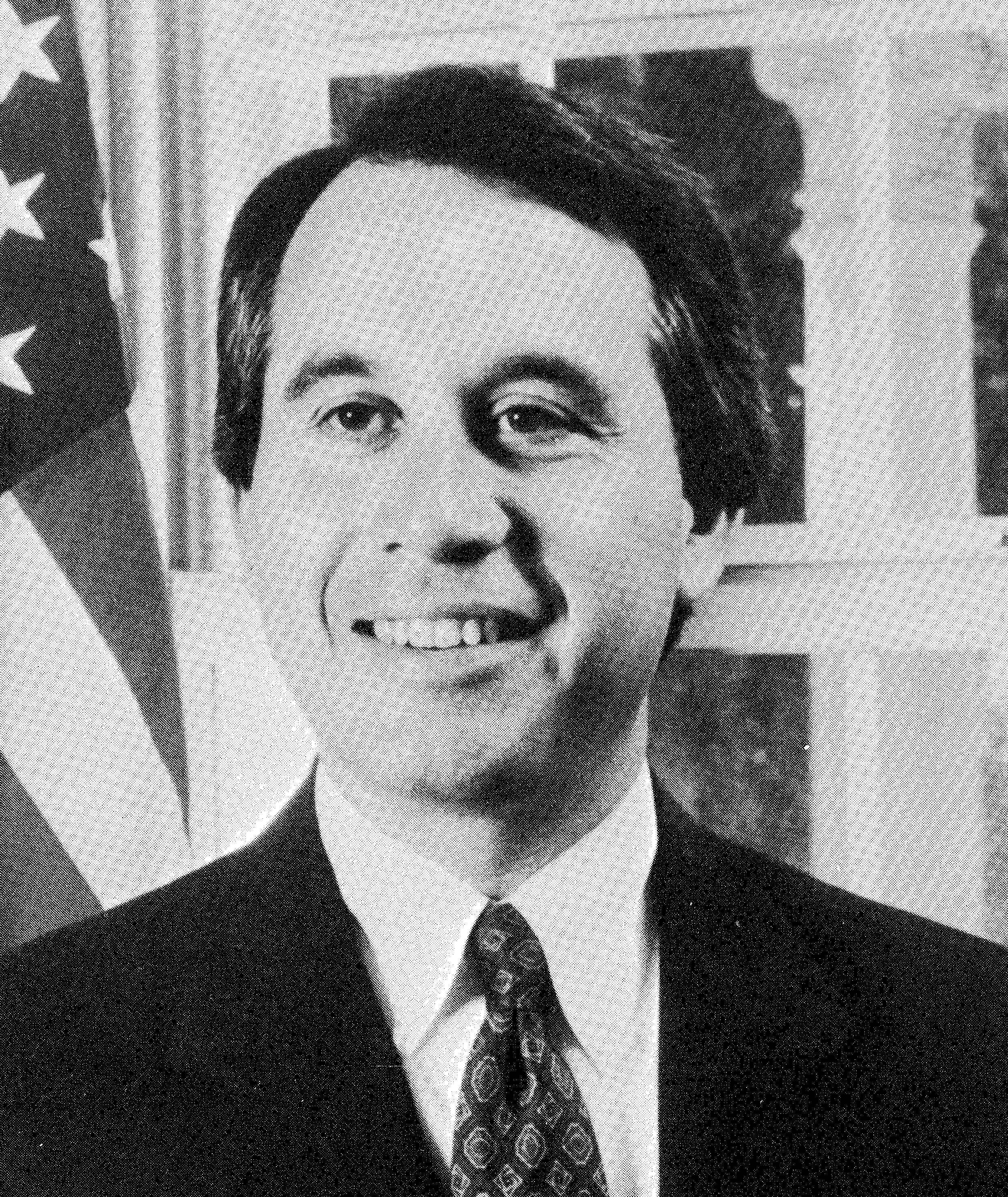

Nominee	Jim Inhofe	David Walters	James Germalic
Party	Republican	Democratic	Independent
Popular vote	583,579	369,789	65,056
Percentage	57.30%	36.31%	6.39%
- County results Inhofe: 40–50% 50–60% 60–70% 70–80% Walters: 40–50% 50–60%
U.S. senator before election
Jim Inhofe
Republican
Elected U.S. Senator
Jim Inhofe
Republican

The 2002 United States Senate election in Oklahoma was held on November 5, 2002. Incumbent Republican U.S. Senator Jim Inhofe won re-election to a second full term. This was the only Oklahoma U.S. Senate race since 1974 that the winner was of a different party than the winner of the concurrent gubernatorial election.

== Major candidates ==
=== Democratic ===
- David Walters, former Governor

=== Independent ===
- James Germalic

=== Republican ===
- James Inhofe, incumbent U.S. Senator

== General election ==
=== Debates ===
- Complete video of debate, October 21, 2002
- Complete video of debate, October 23, 2002

=== Predictions ===
Source	Ranking	As of
Sabato's Crystal Ball	Likely R	November 4, 2002

=== Polling ===
Poll source	Date(s) administered	Sample size (Note: Key: A – all adults RV – registered voters LV – likely voters V – unclear)	Margin of error	James Inhofe (R)	David Walters (D)	Other / Undecided
SurveyUSA	November 1–3, 2002	710 (LV)	± 3.8%	53%	36%	12%

=== Results ===
General election results
Party	Candidate	Votes	%	±%
Republican	James Inhofe (incumbent)	583,579	57.30%	
Democratic	David Walters	369,789	36.31%	
Independent	James Germalic	65,056	6.39%	
Majority		213,790	20.99%	
Turnout		1,018,424		
Republican hold		Swing		

==== Counties that flipped from Democratic to Republican ====
- Cotton (Largest city: Walters)
- Greer (Largest city: Mangum)
- Marshall (Largest city: Madill)
- Osage (Largest city: Hominy)
- Tillman (Largest city: Frederick)

==== Counties that flipped from Republican to Democratic ====
- Kiowa (Largest city: Hobart)
- Love (Largest city: Marietta)

== See also ==
- 2002 United States Senate elections
