= Dale Smith (politician) =

American politician (1937–2016)

Member of the Oklahoma House of Representatives from the 27th district
- In office November 1990 – November 2004
- Preceded by: Steve Lewis
- Succeeded by: Shane Jett

Personal details
- Born: April 11, 1937 Tribbey, Oklahoma, U.S.
- Died: February 10, 2016 (aged 78) St. Louis, Oklahoma, U.S.
- Party: Democratic Party
- Education: Murray State College; Oklahoma Baptist University

Dale Smith (April 11, 1937 — February 10, 2016) was an American politician who served in the Oklahoma House of Representatives representing the 27th district from 1990 to 2004.

== Biography ==
Dale Smith was born on April 11, 1937, in Tribbey, Oklahoma. He graduated from Tribbey High School in 1955, Murray State College in 1957, and Oklahoma Baptist University in 1960. After graduation he worked as a teacher in Tribbey, Harjo, Prague, Verden, Earlsboro and St. Louis.

Smith served in the Oklahoma House of Representatives as a member of the Democratic Party representing the 27th district from 1990 to 2004. He was preceded in office by Democrat Steve Lewis and succeeded in office by Republican Shane Jett. He died on February 10, 2016, in St. Louis, Oklahoma.
