= Leo Gordon =

American actor (1922–2000)

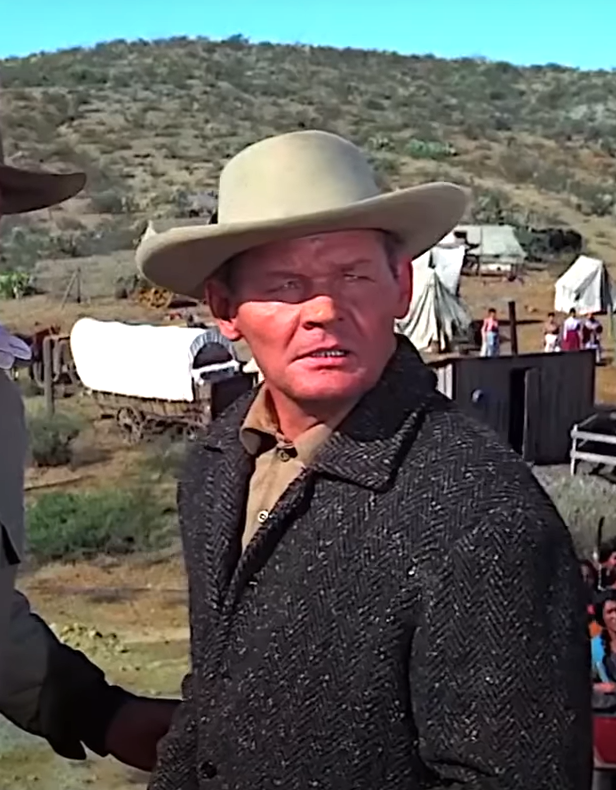
- Gordon in McLintock! (1963)
- Born: Leo Vincent Gordon; December 2, 1922; Brooklyn, New York City, U.S.
- Died: December 26, 2000 (aged 78); Los Angeles, California, U.S.
- Resting place: Hollywood Forever Cemetery
- Occupations: Actor; screenwriter
- Years active: 1952–1994
- Spouse: Lynn Cartwright (m. 1950)
- Children: 1

Leo Vincent Gordon (December 2, 1922 – December 26, 2000) was an American character actor and screenwriter. During more than 40 years in film and television, he was most frequently cast as a supporting actor playing brutish bad guys, but occasionally, he played more sympathetic roles just as effectively.

== Early life and career ==
Gordon was born in Brooklyn in New York City on December 2, 1922. Reared by his father in dire poverty, Gordon grew up during the Great Depression. He left school in the eighth grade, went to work in construction and demolition, and then joined the New Deal agency, the Civilian Conservation Corps, in which he participated in various public works projects. After the United States entered World War II in 1941, Gordon enlisted in the U.S. Army, in which he served for two years and received an undesirable discharge. Gordon was in Southern California where a colleague and he attempted to rob a bar and its patrons with a pistol. He was shot in the stomach by one of the patrons. Convicted of armed robbery, he served five years in San Quentin Prison, where he furthered his education by reading nearly every book in the library.

Gordon took advantage of the benefits accorded him as part of the G.I. Bill and began taking acting lessons at the American Academy of Dramatic Arts. During his time there, Gordon was enrolled with several future screen legends, including Grace Kelly and Anne Bancroft. For a time, Jason Robards, later a two-time Academy Award winner, was Gordon's instructor. There, he also met his future wife, Lynn Cartwright, who had a sporadic but lengthy career as a character actor, mainly in television (though her most famous role came in the 1992 movie A League of Their Own, when she played Geena Davis's aging character Dottie Hinson). They were married in 1950 and remained together until his death a half century later. They had one child, a daughter named Tara.

== Actor in film and television ==
Gordon started his career on the stage and worked with fellow actors Edward G. Robinson and Tyrone Power. He was soon discovered by a Hollywood agent in a Los Angeles production of Darkness at Noon. Over the course of his career, Gordon appeared in more than 170 film and television productions from the early 1950s to the mid-1990s.

In 1954, Gordon portrayed the outlaw Bill Doolin, a native Arkansan who founded the Wild Bunch gang and operated primarily in Kansas, on the syndicated television series Stories of the Century, starring and narrated by Jim Davis.

In 1955, he was cast on the ABC religion anthology series Crossroads in the role of Sergeant Leroy in "All My Love". In 1958, he appeared as Joe Brock in the episode "Desert Fury" of CBS's Tales of the Texas Rangers. That same year, Gordon was cast as Zip Wyatt in "Three Wanted Men" of Rex Allen's syndicated Western series Frontier Doctor. He also played a gunslinging professional killer in the pilot for the television version of Gunsmoke, but many changes were later instituted on the series, such as the marshal's office and Long Branch Saloon looking markedly different and the relationship between Matt Dillon and Kitty being subtly more formal, as well, so the episode was buried deep in the season in the hope that viewers would not notice, which apparently worked. This pilot likely was season one, episode 26's "Hack Prine".

Gordon was often cast to make the most of his 6-foot-2-inch (188 cm) height, intense features, deep, menacing voice, and icy stare. He had radiant light blue eyes. One of his earliest films was Riot in Cell Block 11, shot at Folsom Prison. The film's director, Don Siegel, who worked with such screen tough guys as Clint Eastwood and John Wayne, related, "Leo Gordon was the scariest man I have ever met."

His other notable roles include as John Dillinger in Siegel's Baby Face Nelson, opposite Mickey Rooney as the crazed protagonist. Gordon may be most noted for his recurring Irish character Big Mike McComb on the ABC/Warner Bros. Western television series Maverick, working from 1957 to 1960 alongside James Garner and Jack Kelly. Gordon's five appearances in the role include the much-remembered episode "Shady Deal at Sunny Acres", "According to Hoyle", and "Plunder of Paradise", as well as "War of the Silver Kings", the first installment broadcast. Garner later recalled in his videotaped interview for the Archive of American Television that Gordon purposely punched him for real in one of their first scenes together and that Garner hit him back when filming the next scene. This is obviously visible when Gordon first hits Garner in the stomach, slamming Garner back against a closet door. Garner and Gordon reunited in the 1970s, when Gordon appeared as a dimwitted bodyguard on four episodes of NBC's The Rockford Files starring Garner.

Gordon appeared in multiple roles on Robert Stack's 1959 ABC crime drama The Untouchables. Gordon also guest-starred on the ABC/WB Western series The Alaskans opposite Roger Moore. He was cast as Damian in the 1961 episode "Million Dollar Suit" of the ABC/WB crime drama The Roaring 20's. He also appeared on the NBC Western series Empire, Laramie, and Laredo, the syndicated Tombstone Territory, and both acted in and wrote for Adam-12.

One of Gordon's best-remembered television appearances was on CBS's The Andy Griffith Show in the episode "High Noon in Mayberry", in which he portrays an ex-convict who appears destined for revenge against Sheriff Andy Taylor of fictitious Mayberry. The screenwriters for the episode, Jim Fritzell and Everett Greenbaum, borrowed heavily from Gordon's brief criminal career and subsequent incarceration to supplement the role.

Perhaps Gordon's single most memorable film scene occurred in McLintock! (1963), during which John Wayne knocks him down a long mudslide after uttering the famous line, "Somebody oughta belt you in the mouth. But I won't! I won't! The hell I won't." Another notable role was in the 1966 Western The Night of the Grizzly opposite Clint Walker, one of the very few actors who could match Gordon's intense screen presence regarding physical size and strength. Gordon played bounty hunter Cass Dowdy, who had a soft spot for his enemy's son, but would, as one character said, "...hunt anything for a price, man or animal." Somehow, Gordon managed to make his character as sympathetic as he was frightening, and in his final scene, he gives his life to save the boy.

Gordon portrayed sympathetic parts when called upon to do so, including his performances in Black Patch (1957) and Tobruk (1967), which were both films that he wrote, and in Roger Corman's civil rights drama The Intruder (1962), opposite a young William Shatner.

In 1965, he was cast as the troublemaker Bender in the syndicated Western series Death Valley Days in the episode "No Gun Behind His Badge", a dramatization of the Abilene, Kansas, marshal Thomas J. Smith, depicted in the segment by series host (and future U.S. president) Ronald Reagan. The episode also starred Michael Witney as Wild Bill Hickok, who succeeded Smith as marshal. In 1970, Gordon appeared as Loma Bartender on The Men From Shiloh (rebranded name for The Virginian) on the episode titled "Hannah".

Gordon also appeared as aging wrestler Milo Stavroupolis on NBC's Little House on the Prairie, starring Michael Landon.

Gordon's final role was as Wyatt Earp in a 1994 episode of the television series The Young Indiana Jones Chronicles. He also appeared in the film Maverick that same year with Mel Gibson, Jodie Foster, and James Garner.

== Screenwriter and novelist ==
Gordon was also a prolific screenwriter and novelist. Usually credited as "Leo V. Gordon", he wrote dozens of scripts for television series and movies, sometimes writing a good role for himself. His first successful film script, The Cry Baby Killer, featured a young and unknown Jack Nicholson. He wrote several movies for the Corman brothers, Roger and Gene.

Among the more notable feature films he wrote was You Can't Win 'Em All (1970) starring Tony Curtis and Charles Bronson. He also wrote the screenplay and appeared in Tobruk (1967), which starred Rock Hudson and George Peppard and was directed by Arthur Hiller. As a television screenwriter, he wrote nearly 50 scripts apiece for Bonanza, Cheyenne, and Maverick, in the episodes in which he was not a guest star. In the 1970s, he appeared frequently, as well, on the popular police drama Adam-12, another show that he often scripted. Gordon once told an interviewer that because of his imposing size, he never felt he was fully accepted as a screenwriter: "Writing is more rewarding than acting, but look at my face. Nobody believes I'm a writer. I should be 5' 8", 142 pounds, wear patches on my elbows and horn-rimmed glasses and smoke a pipe. That's a writer!" In addition to his script work for films and television Gordon wrote or co-wrote several novels, including the historical Western Powderkeg.

== Personal life and death ==
In 1997, Gordon received the Golden Boot Award for his many years working in Westerns.

Gordon died, aged 78, on December 26, 2000. His ashes and those of his wife are together in a memorial display in a columbarium at the Hollywood Forever Cemetery in Los Angeles.

== Complete filmography ==
=== 1950s ===
- Safe As You Think (1949) as Tony (uncredited)
- China Venture (1953) as Sgt. Hank Janowicz
- City of Bad Men (1953) as Russell (uncredited)
- Gun Fury (1953) as Tom "Jess" Burgess
- All the Brothers Were Valiant (1953) as Peter How
- Hondo (1953) as Ed Lowe
- Riot in Cell Block 11 (1954) as Crazy Mike Carnie
- The Egyptian (1954) as Minor Role (uncredited)
- The Yellow Mountain (1954) as Drake
- Sign of the Pagan (1954) as Bleda
- The Bamboo Prison (1954) as Pike
- Ten Wanted Men (1955) as Frank Scavo
- Seven Angry Men (1955) as Martin White
- Santa Fe Passage (1955) as Tuss McLawery
- Soldier of Fortune (1955) as Big Matt
- Robbers' Roost (1955) as Jeff
- Tennessee's Partner (1955) as The Sheriff
- Man with the Gun (1955) as Ed Pinchot
- The Conqueror (1956) as Tartar Captain
- The Steel Jungle (1956) as Lupo
- Red Sundown (1956) as Rod Zellman
- The Man Who Knew Too Much (1956) as Chauffeur (uncredited)
- Great Day in the Morning (1956) as Zeff Masterson
- Johnny Concho (1956) as Mason
- 7th Cavalry (1956) as Vogel
- The Restless Breed (1957) as Cherokee
- Lure of the Swamp (1957) as Steggins, Insurance Investigator
- Black Patch (1957) as Hank Danner
- The Tall Stranger (1957) as Stark
- Baby Face Nelson (1957) as John Dillinger
- Man in the Shadow (1957) as Chet Huneker
- The Notorious Mr. Monks (1958) as Chip Klamp
- Quantrill's Raiders (1958) as Quantrill
- The Cry Baby Killer (1958) as Man in Crowd (uncredited)
- Apache Territory (1958) as Zimmerman
- Ride a Crooked Trail (1958) as Sam Mason
- Escort West (1958) as Trooper Vogel
- The Big Operator (1959) as Danny Sacanzi
- The Jayhawkers! (1959) as Jake Barton

=== 1960s ===
- Noose for a Gunman (1960) as Link Roy
- Laramie (1960) as Raff
- The Nun and the Sergeant (1962) as Dockman
- The Intruder (1962) as Sam Griffin
- Tarzan Goes to India (1962) as Bryce, Head Engineer
- The Raven (1963) as Grimes (uncredited voice)
- The Haunted Palace (1963) as Edgar Weeden / Ezra Weeden
- McLintock! (1963) as Jones
- Kings of the Sun (1963) as Hunac Ceel
- Kitten with a Whip (1964) as Enders
- The Girls on the Beach (1965) as Second Waiter (uncredited)
- The Dictator's Guns (1965) as Morrison
- The Night of the Grizzly (1966) as Cass Dowdy
- Beau Geste (1966) as Krauss
- Tobruk (1967) as Sgt. Krug
- Devil's Angels (1967) as Sheriff Henderson
- The St. Valentine's Day Massacre (1967) as Heitler
- Hostile Guns (1967) as Hank Pleasant
- Buckskin (1968) as Travis

=== 1970s ===
- You Can't Win 'Em All (1970) as Bolek
- The Trackers (1971, TV Movie) as Higgins
- Bonnie's Kids (1973) as Charley
- My Name Is Nobody (1973) as Red
- Nashville Girl (1976) as Burt
- The Lucifer Complex (1978) as Norris (uncredited)
- Son of Hitler (1979) as Tuennes
- Bog (1979) as Dr. John Warren

=== 1980s ===
- Rage! (1980, TV Movie) as Cal's Father
- M.A.D.D.: Mothers Against Drunk Drivers (1983, TV Movie) as Officer Horvath
- Fire and Ice (1983) as Jarol
- Savage Dawn (1985) as Sheriff
- The All American Cowboy (1985, TV Movie)
- The Garbage Pail Kids Movie (1987) as Guard #1
- Big Top Pee-wee (1988) as Joe the Blacksmith
- Saturday the 14th Strikes Back (1988) as The Evil One
- Alienator (1989) as Col. Coburn

=== 1990s ===
- Mob Boss (1990) as Don O'Reily
- Maverick (1994) as Poker Player
- The Adventures of Young Indiana Jones: Hollywood Follies (1994, TV Movie) as Wyatt Earp (final film role)

== Partial television credits ==
- Cheyenne – episode "The Outlander" (1955) as MacDonald
- Gunsmoke – five episodes (1956–1974)
- Broken Arrow – episode "The Raiders" (1956) as Will Carr
- Sneak Preview – episode "The Merry-Go-Round" (1956)
- The Walter Winchell File – episode "The Witness" (1957) as Robinson
- Tales of Wells Fargo – three episodes (1957–1961)
- Maverick – five episodes (1957–1959)
- Walt Disney's Wonderful World of Color – two episodes (1958)
- Official Detective – episode "Muggers" (1958) as Joseph Kirku
- Sea Hunt – episode "Flooded Mine" (1958) as panicky miner
- Bat Masterson – episode "Dude's Folly" (1958) as Joe Quince and episode "Law of the Land (1960) as Red Eric Peterson
- The Rifleman (1958–1963) – two episodes
- Perry Mason – episode "The Case of the Dangerous Dowager" (1959) as Charles Duncan
- Bonanza – 3 episodes (1959–1968) as Early Thorne / Forsythe / Fargo Taylor
- Have Gun - Will Travel as Harkness in S4E16 "The Sanctuary" (1960)
- The Untouchables – two episodes (1960)
- The Andy Griffith Show – episode "High Noon in Mayberry" (1963) as Luke Comstock
- Laredo – episode "Lazyfoot, Where Are You?" (1965) as Moose
- Daniel Boone – episode "A Rope for Mingo" (1965) as Silas Morgan
- Laredo – episode "The Land Slickers" (1966) as Wayne Emerson
- Rango – episode "The Daring Holdup of the Deadwood Stage" (1967) as Slade
- McCloud – episode "Horse Stealing on Fifth Avenue" (1970) as Officer Shannen
- O'Hara, U.S. Treasury – episode "Operation: Hijack" (1971) as Harry Wilson
- Alias Smith and Jones – episode "Smiler with a Gun" (1971) as Ebenezer
- Hec Ramsey – episode "The Mystery of Chalk Hill" (1973) as Shaneley
- The F.B.I. – episode "Diamond Run" (1974) as Drunk Driver
- Adam-12 – five episodes (1971–1975)
- Cannon – episode "A Touch of Venom" (1975) as Jack Danvers
- The Rockford Files – four episodes (1978–1979)
- The Dukes of Hazzard – episode "Deputy Dukes" (1979) as Rocky Marlowe
- Little House on the Prairie – episode "The King Is Dead" (1979) as Milo Stavroupolis
- Fantasy Island – two episodes (1980–1981)
- The Winds of War (1983 TV miniseries) as General "Train" Anderson
- The Rousters episode "The Marshal of Sladetown" (1983) as Unhappy Gun Buyer
- Magnum, P.I. – episode "The People vs. Orville Wright" (1987) as Croquet Player
