= Pat Conway =

American actor

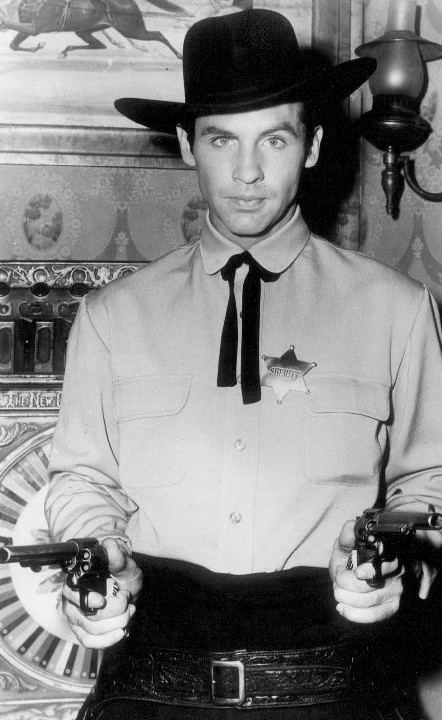
- Conway as Clay Hollister, 1958.
- Born: Patrick Douglas Conway; January 9, 1931; Los Angeles, California, U.S.
- Died: April 24, 1981 (aged 50); Santa Barbara County, California, U.S.
- Education: Menlo Park Junior College, Pasadena Playhouse School of the Theater
- Occupation: Actor
- Height: 6 ft 3 in (1.91 m)
- Father: Jack Conway
- Family: Francis X. Bushman (grandfather)

Patrick Douglas Conway (January 9, 1931 – April 24, 1981) was an American actor best known for starring as Sheriff Clay Hollister on the Western television series Tombstone Territory (1957–1960).

== Early years ==
Conway was the son of Metro-Goldwyn-Mayer director Jack Conway, and grandson of Francis X. Bushman.

== Career ==
Conway's first role was in the 1951 movie Westward the Women as Sid Cutler. Conway was Tim Dooley in the 1955 movie An Annapolis Story.

In Tombstone Territory, Conway played Tombstone Sheriff Clay Hollister, set in the Arizona Territory. The series ran for three seasons from October 16, 1957 to July 8, 1960. He also played many guest roles in Western serials, including Gunsmoke, The Texan as Big Mike Taylor, Rawhide, and Bonanza. He also had parts in two movies: Geronimo in 1962 and Brighty of the Grand Canyon in 1967. His final roles were in The Streets of San Francisco TV show in 1975, the television movie The Abduction of Saint Anne, The Bullet in 1972, and The Endgame in 1973.

== Death ==
Conway died in Santa Barbara County, California, on April 24, 1981, at the age of 50 from renal failure.

== See also ==
- The Life and Legend of Wyatt Earp
- Bat Masterson
