= Steve Lewis (politician) =

American politician

U.S. Attorney for the Northern District of Oklahoma
- In office August 1993 – December 2, 2000
- Appointed by: Bill Clinton
- Preceded by: Tony M. Graham
- Succeeded by: David E. O'Meilia

38th Speaker of the Oklahoma House of Representatives
- In office May 17, 1989 – January 1991
- Preceded by: Jim Barker
- Succeeded by: Glen D. Johnson Jr.

Member of the Oklahoma House of Representatives from the 27th district
- In office 1980–1990
- Preceded by: James B. Townsend
- Succeeded by: Dale Smith

District attorney for Pottawatomie and Lincoln Counties
- In office 1971–1979
- Preceded by: John L. Clifton Jr.
- Succeeded by: Bill Roberson

Personal details
- Education: Oklahoma Baptist University; University of Oklahoma College of Law

Military service
- Branch/service: United States Navy

Steve Lewis is an American attorney and politician who served as the 38th Speaker of the Oklahoma House of Representatives from 1989 to 1991. He also served as the U.S. Attorney for the Northern District of Oklahoma from 1993 to 2000, the 27th district of the Oklahoma House representative from 1980 to 1990, and as the district attorney for Pottawatomie and Lincoln Counties from 1971 to 1979.

== Biography ==
Steve Lewis graduated from Oklahoma Baptist University and the University of Oklahoma College of Law. He entered the U. S. Navy as a Judge Advocate General and served in the Philippines for three years. He was the elected district attorney for Pottawatomie and Lincoln Counties from 1971 to 1979. He was elected to Oklahoma House of Representatives representing the 27th district in 1980. From 1989 to 1991 he served as the 38th Speaker of the Oklahoma House of Representatives. He unsuccessfully ran for Governor of Oklahoma in 1990 and for U. S. Senate in 1992. He was appointed as the U.S. Attorney for the Northern District of Oklahoma in 1993 by President Bill Clinton. He resigned December 2, 2000, to enter private practice.
