= Mike Fair (Oklahoma politician) =

American politician (1942–2022)

Michael Edward Fair (December 11, 1942 – February 28, 2022) was an American politician and businessman.

Fair was born in Birmingham, Alabama and lived in East Point, Georgia, with his family. In 1959, Fair and his family moved to Oklahoma City, Oklahoma. He graduated from U.S. Grant High School, in Oklahoma City. Fair went to University of Central Oklahoma, New Mexico Highlands University, and the University of Oklahoma. Fair served in the United States Army during the Cuban Missile Crisis. He was involved in the insurance business in Oklahoma City. Fair served in the Oklahoma House of Representatives in 1967 and 1968 and in 1979 to 1986. He also served in the Oklahoma Senate from 1988 to 2004 and was a Republican. Fair died at his home in Oklahoma City, Oklahoma, on February 28, 2022, at the age of 79.
