= David Walters =

American politician and businessman (born 1951)

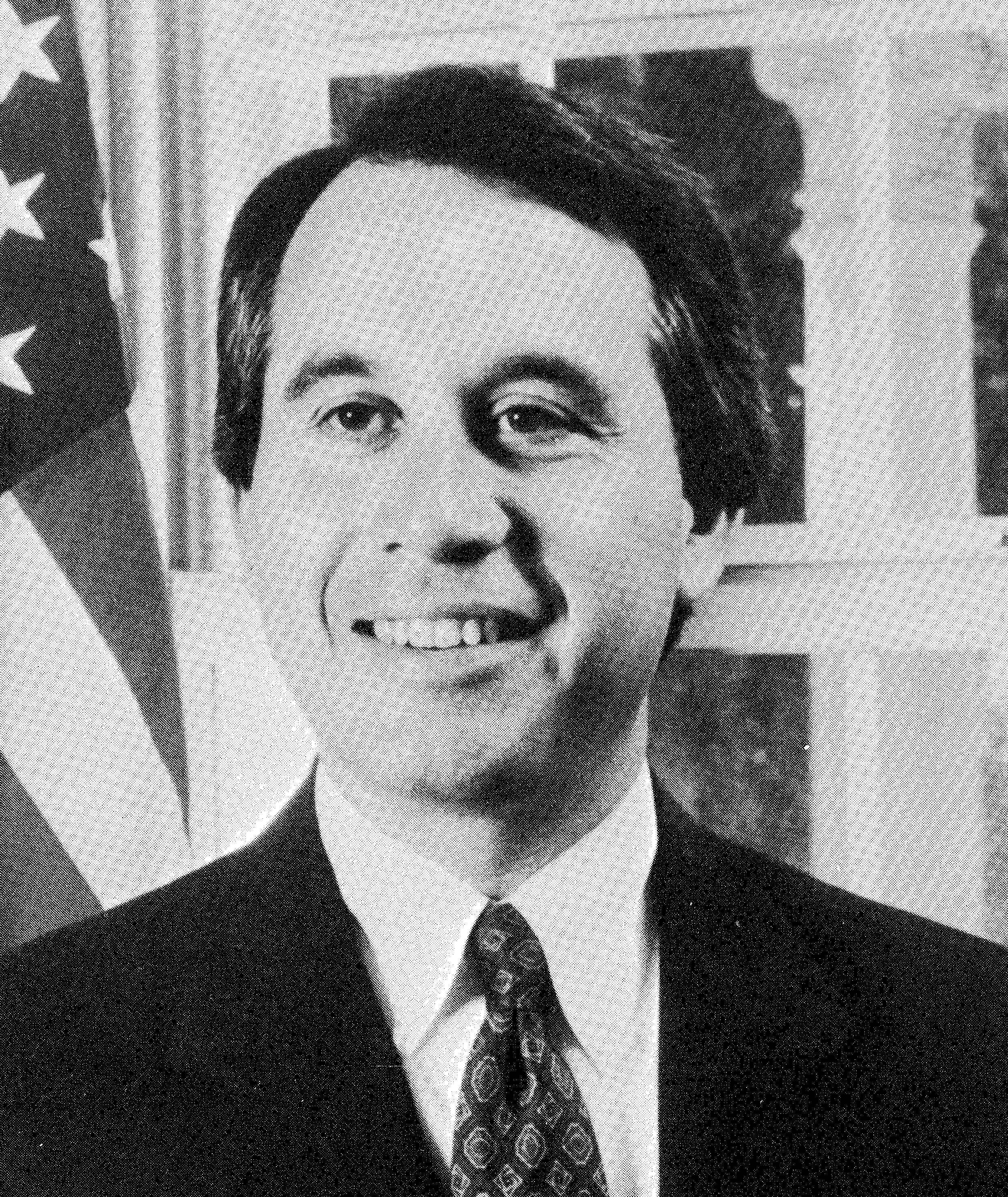

24th Governor of Oklahoma
- In office January 14, 1991 – January 9, 1995
- Lieutenant: Jack Mildren
- Preceded by: Henry Bellmon
- Succeeded by: Frank Keating

Personal details
- Born: David Lee Walters; November 20, 1951 (age 74) Canute, Oklahoma, U.S.
- Party: Democratic
- Children: 4
- Education: University of Oklahoma (BS); Harvard University (MBA)

David Lee Walters (born November 20, 1951) is an American businessman and politician who served as the 24th governor of Oklahoma from 1991 to 1995.

Born in Canute, Oklahoma, Walters was a project manager for Governor David Boren and the youngest executive officer working for the University of Oklahoma Health Sciences Center. He also worked in commercial real estate. As governor, he increased education funding, but his term was marred by controversies that ended with him pleading guilty to a misdemeanor election violation. He did not seek re-election and was defeated in a 2002 campaign for the United States Senate. He is the CEO of Walters Power International, a global provider of local power.

== Early life ==
Walters was born near Canute, Oklahoma to Harold and Yvonne Marie (née Warnke) Walters. He graduated as valedictorian from Canute High School in 1969. He earned a bachelor's degree in industrial engineering from the University of Oklahoma in 1973 and a master's degree in business administration from Harvard University in 1977.

He worked as the project manager for Governor David Boren and as the assistant and associate provost of the University of Oklahoma Health Sciences Center. At the age of 29, he was the youngest executive officer in the university’s history. In 1982, he joined The Burks Group, a commercial real estate company. He was appointed co-chairman of the governor's 100-member Reform Commission in 1984 and became the president of American Fidelity Property Company in 1985.

== Governor of Oklahoma (1991–1995) ==
In 1986, Walters was the Democratic nominee for Governor of Oklahoma, but was defeated by Republican Henry L. Bellmon, who returned to the governorship after completing his first term 20 years earlier.

On November 6, 1990, Walters was elected governor, carrying 75 of the state’s 77 counties. During his term education funding increased by approximately 30 percent and a $350 million bond issue for higher education brought construction and renovation to every state college campus.

Walters planned on making the Blue Room, a large ceremonial hall in the State Capitol, into his office.

While in office he was accused of election violations in that he conspired to hide $18,000 in campaign donations by attributing them to someone else. At the end of procedures, Governor Walters asked prosecutors what they wanted to end the rather lengthy process. An agreement was reached that the governor would plead guilty to a misdemeanor offense and pay a fine, in return for which his record would be expunged in twelve months. Though Walters claimed his innocence of the charges, he said it was in the best interest of the state and his family to accept the plea agreement. Twelve months later the charge was expunged from his record. He did not run for re-election in 1994, citing the pressure and negative publicity of political office, which he partly blamed for the suicide of his son in 1991.

=== Cabinet ===
- Secretary of State - John Kennedy (1991-1995)
- Secretary of Agriculture - Gary Sherrer (1991–1995)
- Secretary of Education - Sandy Garrett (1991–1995)
- Secretary of Energy - Charles R. Nesbitt (1991–1995)
- Secretary of Human Resources - James Thomas (1991), Oscar B. Jackson Jr. (1991–1995)
- Secretary of Safety and Security - Robert Fitzpatrick (1991–1995)
- Secretary of Transportation - Delmas Ford (1991-1995)
- Secretary of Veterans Affairs - John Willis (1991-1995)

== U.S. Senate campaign ==
In 2002, Walters was the unsuccessful Democratic nominee for the United States Senate, losing to incumbent Jim Inhofe.

Party political offices
Preceded by George Nigh	Democratic nominee for Governor of Oklahoma; 1986, 1990	Succeeded by Jack Mildren
Preceded by John Waihee	Chair of the Democratic Governors Association; 1992–1993	Succeeded by Evan Bayh
Preceded by James Boren	Democratic nominee for U.S. Senator from Oklahoma (Class 2); 2002	Succeeded by Andrew Rice
Political offices
Preceded by Henry Bellmon	Governor of Oklahoma; 1991–1995	Succeeded by Frank Keating
U.S. order of precedence (ceremonial)
Preceded by Martha McSally as Former U.S. Senator	Order of precedence of the United States; Within Oklahoma	Succeeded by Frank Keating as Former Governor
Preceded by Gary Herbert as Former Governor	Order of precedence of the United States; Outside Oklahoma	Succeeded by Frank Keating as Former Governor
