= Wapanucka, Oklahoma =

- Town
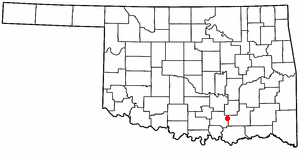
- Location of Wapanucka, Oklahoma
- Coordinates: 34°22′28″N 96°25′31″W
- Country: United States
- State: Oklahoma
- County: Johnston

Area
  - Total: 0.66 sq mi (1.70 km^{2})
  - Land: 0.65 sq mi (1.68 km^{2})
  - Water: 0.0077 sq mi (0.02 km^{2})
- Elevation: 633 ft (193 m)

Population (2020)
  - Total: 386
  - Density: 593.8/sq mi (229.25/km^{2})
- Time zone: UTC-6 (Central (CST))
  - Summer (DST): UTC-5 (CDT)
- ZIP code: 73461
- Area code: 580
- FIPS code: 40-78300
- GNIS feature ID: 2413448

Wapanucka (pronounced Wop´-uh-nuck´-uh) is a town in northeastern Johnston County, Oklahoma, United States. The population was 386 as of the 2020 Census. It is about 20 miles (32 km) northeast of Tishomingo. The town name refers to the Delaware Nation and means "Eastern Land People."

== History ==
The Board of Foreign Missions of the Presbyterian Church built the Wapanucka Female Manual Labour School in 1851–2. The school, which opened in 1852, was named for a nearby creek. Local residents often called it Allen's Academy, for James S. Allen, who supervised it. Later many dubbed it Rock Academy for its impressive stone building. The school closed in 1860 after the Presbyterian Board withdrew its financial support. The Confederate forces used the building during the Civil War as a hospital and a prison. After the war the academy reopened, serving male and female students. In 1890 it became a boys' school. In 1911 it was permanently closed and the property sold. The Wapanucka Academy site was listed in the National Register of Historic Places listings in Johnston County, Oklahoma (NR 72001065) in 1972.

== Geography ==
Wapanucka is located 20 miles (32 km) northeast of Tishomingo, the county seat.

According to the United States Census Bureau, the town has a total area of 0.7 square miles (1.8 km^{2}), of which 0.7 square miles (1.8 km^{2}) is land and 1.49% is water.

== Demographics ==
Historical population
Census	Pop.	Note	%±
1910	948		—
1920	1,038		9.5%
1930	553		−46.7%
1940	730		32.0%
1950	592		−18.9%
1960	459		−22.5%
1970	425		−7.4%
1980	472		11.1%
1990	402		−14.8%
2000	445		10.7%
2010	438		−1.6%
2020	386		−11.9%
U.S. Decennial Census

=== 2020 census ===
As of the 2020 census, Wapanucka had a population of 386. The median age was 34.6 years. 28.0% of residents were under the age of 18 and 18.9% of residents were 65 years of age or older. For every 100 females there were 106.4 males, and for every 100 females age 18 and over there were 109.0 males age 18 and over.

0.0% of residents lived in urban areas, while 100.0% lived in rural areas.

There were 152 households in Wapanucka, of which 38.2% had children under the age of 18 living in them. Of all households, 39.5% were married-couple households, 25.0% were households with a male householder and no spouse or partner present, and 17.8% were households with a female householder and no spouse or partner present. About 27.0% of all households were made up of individuals and 9.2% had someone living alone who was 65 years of age or older.

There were 190 housing units, of which 20.0% were vacant. The homeowner vacancy rate was 7.3% and the rental vacancy rate was 14.3%.

Racial composition as of the 2020 census
Race	Number	Percent
White	264	68.4%
Black or African American	2	0.5%
American Indian and Alaska Native	63	16.3%
Asian	0	0.0%
Native Hawaiian and Other Pacific Islander	0	0.0%
Some other race	5	1.3%
Two or more races	52	13.5%
Hispanic or Latino (of any race)	18	4.7%

=== 2000 census ===
As of the census of 2000, there were 445 people, 174 households, and 117 families residing in the town. The population density was 673.8 inhabitants per square mile (260.2/km^{2}). There were 208 housing units at an average density of 314.9 per square mile (121.6/km^{2}). The racial makeup of the town was 71.46% White, 17.75% Native American, 0.22% Asian, 6.07% from other races, and 4.49% from two or more races. Hispanic or Latino of any race were 7.87% of the population.

There were 174 households, out of which 32.2% had children under the age of 18 living with them, 52.9% were married couples living together, 9.2% had a female householder with no husband present, and 32.2% were non-families. 25.3% of all households were made up of individuals, and 13.8% had someone living alone who was 65 years of age or older. The average household size was 2.56 and the average family size was 3.12.

In the town, the population was spread out, with 27.9% under the age of 18, 10.3% from 18 to 24, 25.8% from 25 to 44, 18.4% from 45 to 64, and 17.5% who were 65 years of age or older. The median age was 33 years. For every 100 females, there were 102.3 males. For every 100 females age 18 and over, there were 95.7 males.

The median income for a household in the town was $19,922, and the median income for a family was $25,208. Males had a median income of $19,250 versus $16,250 for females. The per capita income for the town was $9,883. About 24.8% of families and 31.7% of the population were below the poverty line, including 32.1% of those under age 18 and 41.3% of those age 65 or over.

== Notable people ==
- Jack P. Juhan, Marine Corps officer during World War II, who reached the rank of major general
- Harriet Wright O'Leary (1916-1999), American teacher and politician and first woman to serve on the tribal council of the Choctaw Nation of Oklahoma
- Richard Lowell Weathers, who served as Mayor of Mustang, Oklahoma, from 1981 to 1985.
