= Lynn Cartwright =

American actress (1927–2004)

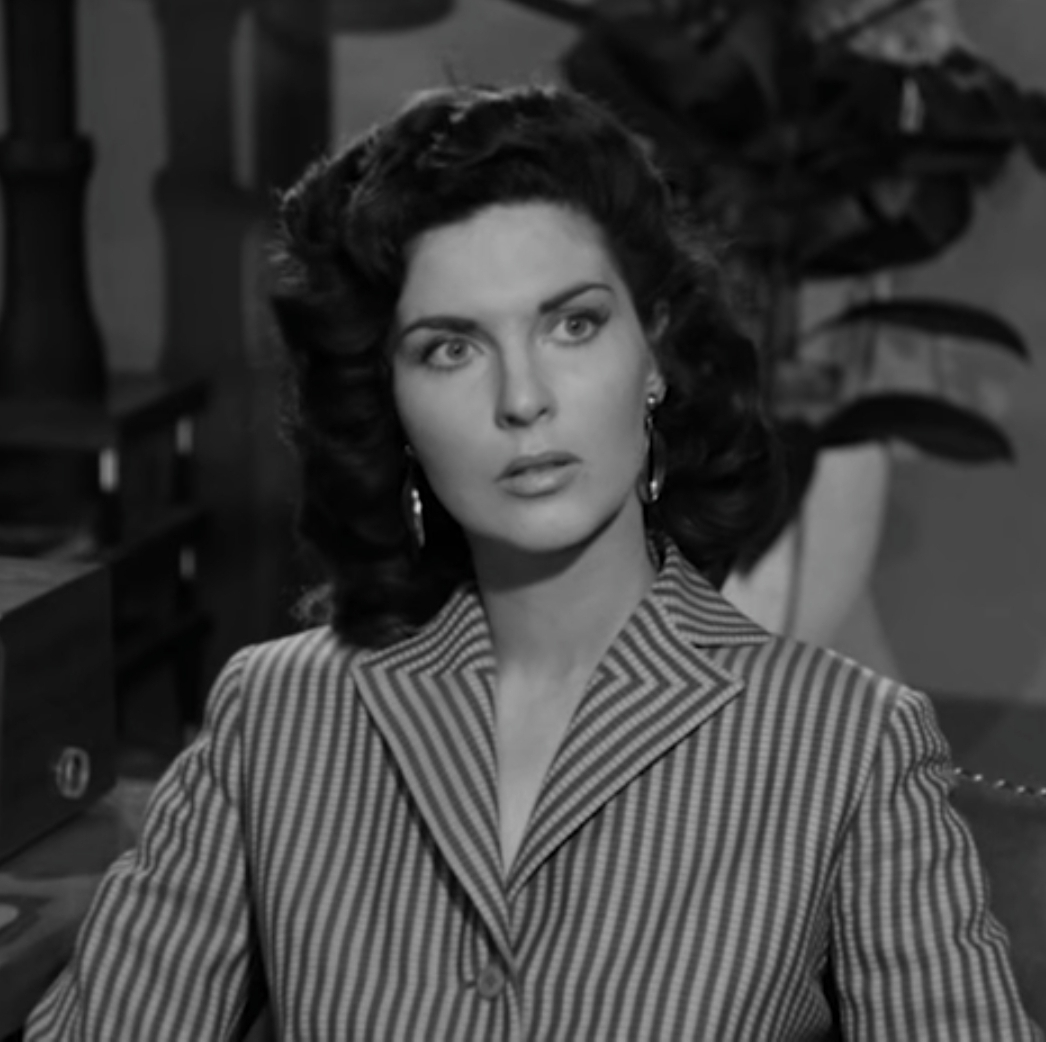
- Cartwright in The Wasp Woman (1959)
- Born: Doralyn E. Cartwright; February 27, 1927; McAlester, Oklahoma, U.S.
- Died: January 2, 2004 (aged 76); Los Angeles, California, U.S.
- Resting place: Hollywood Forever Cemetery
- Occupation: Actress
- Years active: 1955–1992
- Notable work: A League of Their Own
- Spouse: Leo Gordon (m. 1950; died 2000)
- Children: 1
- Father: Wilburn Cartwright

Lynn Cartwright (born Doralyn E. Cartwright; February 27, 1927 – January 2, 2004) was an American character actress known for her performance as the older version of Geena Davis' character, Dottie Hinson, in the 1992 film A League of Their Own.

== Early years ==
Cartwright was born in McAlester, Oklahoma, the daughter of U.S. Congressman Wilburn Cartwright and his wife Carrie (née Staggs). She studied drama at Stephens College and at American Academy in New York.

== Career ==
Her acting career spanned from 1957 to 1992 and included smaller roles in films such as Black Patch (1957), The Cry Baby Killer (1958), The Wasp Woman (1959), All the Loving Couples (1969), Son of Hitler (1978) and Lovelines (1984). For 15 years, she was involved with the Group Repertory Theater in Los Angeles.

Cartwright was chosen for the role in A League of Their Own not just because she closely resembled Geena Davis, but also because many of her mannerisms were similar.

== Personal life ==
Cartwright was married to actor and screenwriter Leo Gordon from February 14, 1950, until his death on December 24, 2000. She had a daughter, Tara, and a stepdaughter.

== Death ==
She died in her home from complications of dementia on January 2, 2004, aged 76, after she fractured her hip. Her ashes and those of her husband are together in a memorial display in a columbarium at the Hollywood Forever Cemetery in Los Angeles.

== Filmography ==
Year	Title	Role	Notes
1957	Black Patch	Kitty	
1958	Alfred Hitchcock Presents	Jean Sobel	Season 3 Episode 19: "The Equalizer"
1958	The Cry Baby Killer	Julie	
1958	Queen of Outer Space	Venusian Girl #4	
1959	Highway Patrol	Margret Baker	Season 4, Episode 34: "Express Delivery"
1959	The Wasp Woman	Maureen Reardon	
1960	The Apartment	Elevator Supervisor with Clicker	Uncredited
1965	The Girls on the Beach	Waitress	Uncredited
1969	All the Loving Couples	Natalie	
1969	The Erotic Adventures of Robin Hood	Lady Sallyforth	
1971	Adam-12	Jessica Caldwell	Episode: "Million Dollar Bluff"
1972	Adam-12	Clare Evans	Episode: "Hot Spell"
1972	Class of '74	Marsha	
1972	Where Does It Hurt?		
1975	Adam-12	Jan Cartwright	Episode: "Gus Corbin"
1978	The Seniors	Miss Creighton	
1978	The Lucifer Complex	Assistant Brunner	
1979	Son of Hitler	Annie	
1984	Lovelines	Mrs. Woodson	
1987	The Garbage Pail Kids Movie	Fashion Show Host	
1992	A League of Their Own	Older Dottie Hinson	(final film role)
