= 1965 Oklahoma Supreme Court scandal =

U.S. political scandal involving judicial misconduct

The 1965 Oklahoma Supreme Court scandal was a political scandal in the U.S. state of Oklahoma involving judicial misconduct on the Oklahoma Supreme Court. Justice N. S. Corn was convicted in 1964 on federal tax evasion charges. After his conviction, he implicated himself, Samuel Earl Welch, and Napoleon Bonaparte Johnson in accepting bribes to decide cases.

Corn had resigned after his conviction and Justice Welch resigned after impeachment precedings began in the Oklahoma House of Representatives. Justice Johnson refused to resign and became the first Oklahoma Supreme Court Justice impeached and removed from office.

== Background ==
In 1964 Oklahoma Supreme Court Justice N. S. Corn was convicted for filing false federal income tax returns. After his conviction, Corn admitted to accepting bribes between 1938 and 1959 in return for his vote on the court and implicated fellow justices Samuel Earl Welch and Napoleon Bonaparte Johnson in also accepting bribes. After Corn made his sworn statements implicating the other still-sitting justices, United States District Judge Stephen Sanders Chandler Jr. passed a copy along to Justice William A. Berry.

Berry was worried about being sued for libel if he released the allegations publicly, so he planned to pass the statement on to a member of the Oklahoma Legislature since legislators had legislative immunity to libel charges when speaking in a session of the legislature. Berry eventually decided to give the statement to Representative G. T. Blankenship.

== Investigation ==
On January 21, 1965, state Representative G. T. Blankenship read a summary of a sworn statement from N. S. Corn to the Oklahoma House of Representatives describing how Corn, Samuel Earl Welch, and Napoleon Bonaparte Johnson had all accepted bribes to decide cases pending before the court. An investigative committee of the Oklahoma Bar Association recommended charges be filed against Welch and Johnson.

=== Charges, impeachment, and investigations ===
A federal grand jury indicted Corn, Welch, Johnson, and former Mayor of Oklahoma City O. A. Cargill. Cargill was eventually convicted of perjury. On March 18, 1965, the Oklahoma House began impeachment proceedings against Welch and Johnson, with Welch immediately resigning. Johnson refused to resign and later became the first impeached and removed justice of the Oklahoma Supreme Court.

State Senator Roy Granthan was the prosecutor for the Oklahoma Senate trial of Justice Johnson. N. S. Corn testified that he accepted a bribe and shared it with Johnson, while Johnson took the stand in his defense and denied the allegations. He was ultimately convicted in the Senate by one vote.

== Aftermath ==
While initially Speaker of the Oklahoma House J. D. McCarty opposed judicial reform, he was later convicted of income tax evasion, allowing Governor Dewey Bartlett to push through reforms. On May 3, 1966, voters approved the creation of the Oklahoma Court on the Judiciary. On July 11, 1967, voters approved two state questions to abolish justices of the peace, the county court system, and special courts (replacing them with district courts) and replaced Oklahoma's system of judicial elections with the Oklahoma Judicial Nominating Commission for selecting judges.
