= Napoleon B. Johnson =

American judge

- Born: January 17, 1891; Maysville, Oklahoma (then in Cherokee Nation, Indian Territory)
- Died: 1974 (aged 82–83)
- Other names: N. B. Johnson; Napoleon Bonaparte Johnson
- Occupations: Attorney, Judge
- Known for: President of National Congress of American Indians (NCAI); Justice of the Oklahoma State Supreme Court;
- Notable work: Founder of NCAI

Napoleon Bonaparte Johnson (more often written as either N. B. Johnson or Napoleon B. Johnson) was born on January 17, 1891, in Maysville, Oklahoma (then in Cherokee Nation, Indian Territory). He was the oldest child of John Wade and Sarah (née Mays) Johnson, who had three other children, as well. John Johnson was half Cherokee, and his wife was white, making Napoleon and his siblings one-quarter Cherokee. The father was a professional stock trader and an elder in a local Presbyterian church. John raised his son like any other native Cherokee boy and saw to it that he started his education in a local Presbyterian mission school. (Note: He moved to Talequah, where he lived from 1893 to 1896, before moving to Anadarko in 1896.) He moved to Claremore in 1905, which he called his home most of his life. His formal education ended with a Bachelor of Laws (LL.B.) degree at Cumberland University.

In 1908, Napoleon apparently felt the urge to venture more widely. After visiting a naval recruiting station in Oklahoma City, he won parental approval to enlist. According to Herley, he became quite homesick while even before he arrived at a naval base in California. Still, he persisted, and spent a month training aboard the U.S.S. Pensacola, before returning home. It was the end of his naval career. Johnson graduated from Mary Gregory Memorial School, a Presbyterian mission school, at Anadarko in western Oklahoma in 1909.

After graduation from high school, Johnson joined the federal Indian Service, working first at a variety jobs in Tower, Minnesota, the Otoe-Missouria agency at Red Rock, Oklahoma (1913–14), and the Chilocco Indian Agricultural School at Chilocco, Oklahoma (1914–17). He later graduated from the state University Preparatory School (later renamed Oklahoma Military Academy), and attended Henry Kendall College (now Tulsa University).

Johnson re-entered the military during 1918, this time enlisting in the U.S. Army. After his discharge, he worked briefly for the Osage Indian Agency legal department, then returned to Claremore where he was appointed Assistant District Attorney for Rogers County, Oklahoma.

The biographical sketch written by Harlow in 1930 noted Johnson's interest in tribal and educational affairs.

== Early years ==
Johnson was educated in the Anadarko schools, Mary Gregory Presbyterian Mission, Eastern University Prep School, Henry Kendall College (later renamed as the University of Tulsa), where he spent two years. Then he went to Cumberland University, where he earned the LL.B. degree in June, 1921. He returned to Oklahoma, where he passed the bar exam and became a licensed attorney, then went to work in the legal department of the Osage Agency, before moving back to Claremore. Johnson worked for the U.S. Indian Service in 1913–17, then became assistant county attorney for Rogers County, Oklahoma in 1923–25, then county attorney 1925–28. Herley wrote that Johnson was elected to another term as county attorney in 1930, which he resigned in 1931 to open his own law practice; he continued for three years, when he was appointed as district judge for the Oklahoma Twelfth District.

Harlow's biographical sketch noted that Johnson attended tribal meetings at Talequah and "...takes unusual interest in tribal affairs and educational work for Indians." Harlow also wrote that in 1920, Johnson was listed as a registered Democrat and County Attorney for Rogers County, Oklahoma. p. 717. Herley noted that about 1925, Johnson began participating in Democratic conventions in Oklahoma City.

== Indian activism ==
Consistent with his political party affiliation, Johnson actively supported Franklin D. Roosevelt and his New Deal Program in the early 1930s. He was soon disappointed, and particularly disagreed with the new Democratic Commissioner of the Bureau of Indian Affairs (BIA), John Collier. (Note: Johnson believed that his followers' goal should be to fulfill, "... their destiny as self-reliant citizens, and not to remain as dependent retarded wards of the United States BIA. Collier's goal seemed to be simply ending the mission of the BIA as soon practical, and to end the concept of tribal land ownership by parceling out the land to the individual members of the tribe.) Although Johnson was a member of the Cherokee tribe, his views about the organization needed to cope with the massive Bureau of Indian Affairs (BIA) extended much farther than a single tribe.

The National Congress of American Indians (NCAI) held its first convention in Denver, Colorado, in 1944. Initially, Johnson was reluctant to attend, but was talked into going by some of his many friends in Oklahoma. His level of education, knowledge of the American legal system and how to work within it, status as a judge and his natural skills as a leader impressed attendees who had not previously known him. He was unanimously elected president of the NCAI. About 80 delegates from 50 tribes and associations in 27 states came together at the Cosmopolitan Hotel in Denver, Colorado, on November 15, 1944. The delegates then created ten permanent committees and elected an executive council, consisting of four officers and eight councilmen. By November 18, the council had passed 18 resolutions that concerned three main topics: (1) sovereignty, (2) civil rights and (3) political recognition for all Indians. These became the platform NCAI would address during the coming year. Within a year, NCAI claimed to have over 300 members, from nearly every tribe in the U.S. Johnson served as president until 1952.

By 1952, Johnson was hearing warnings that many members felt that his approach was ineffective in combating the political leaders who continued to press for termination of Federal benefits to Indians. Some members even claimed that NCAI was controlled by "...a small clique of its present officers," and "stooges of the Indian Bureau." An astute politician, Johnson announced that he was resigning as President of NCAI, and would be replaced by W. W. Short.

== Oklahoma Supreme Court Scandals ==
=== Judge Corn's Confession ===
On December 9, 1964, former Oklahoma Supreme Court Justice, N. S. Corn, then 80 years old and serving an 18-month sentence in a federal prison for income tax evasion, gave a sworn statement to the government detailing his involvement in the crime of bribery. The document named two other Supreme Court justices, Napoleon B. Johnson and Earl Welch, plus several other people as also participating in the scheme. (Note: Two other powerful political figures named by Corn were O. A. Cargill, Sr., formerly mayor of Oklahoma City and J. D. McCarty, three-term speaker of the Oklahoma House of Representatives.) Corn also admitted that he could not recall failing to receive a bribe in any of the 24 years he had served on the court. Ten days later, Corn was freed early.

One copy of Corn's affidavit was sent to Federal Judge Stephen Chandler. Simply having Corn's affidavit in hand was not enough to start a battle for reform. Chandler then called one of the most recently elected Supreme Court judges, William H. Berry, for a private meeting at Chandler's home, where Berry read the document and agreed that somehow the document must be made public. With Chandler's agreement, Berry contacted Oklahoma County Representative, G. T. Blankenship, who was appalled by what the document revealed. (Note: Blankenship happened to be the first Republican elected from Oklahoma County since 1928.) Berry assured Blankenship that if he would read Corn's affidavit aloud from the House floor, he (Blankenship) would be protected by legislative immunity and could not be sued. The representative agreed to do this.

After the legislature reconvened in January, 1965, Blankenship asked for the floor and began to speak. Apparently, the subject was still a well kept secret. The House remained in absolute silence throughout the speech. The stunned Democratic members began to shout cries of "Politics!" But the press reported the entire story to the public and would not let go. The Oklahoman printed a stirring editorial about how the state needed to reform the way judges were elected. (Note: As Oklahoma City Attorney, Bob Burke said many years later, "The cat was out of the bag.") So many powerful politicians believed that they had greatly benefitted from the status quo, that many people expected serious retribution against Blankenship. Governor Henry Bellmon ordered the State Board of Investigation to sweep the legislator's house for electronic eavesdropping devices, thinking that the opposition would likely try to destroy his credibility. He was also warned to go straight home every night after work - no stops for drinks or dinner at bars and restaurants for the same reason.

=== Investigation and Impeachment ===
On March 9, 1965, Supreme Court Justice Johnson took a lie detector examination concerning the allegation that he received $7,500 in return for a favorable ruling. He failed. Following that, the Oklahoma State House of Representatives passed bills of impeachment against him. The Oklahoma State Senate convicted him in an impeachment trial, automatically removing him from office and ending his judicial career.

After Johnson's conviction, Justice Berry wrote a book, Justice for Sale: The Shocking Scandal of the Oklahoma Supreme Court, detailing his views of the scandal. In it, he placed much of the blame on the system Oklahoma used for selecting judges, especially those trying to become appellate judges. Berry called the old system, in which bribes were simply passed off as "campaign contributions," "...a scandal waiting to happen." Burck Bailey, president of the Oklahoma Bar Association, said in a 1988 address to the OBA:"The villain in this sordid affair may be the method used in Oklahoma to fill judicial office.... The potential for corruption is inherent in the system. These payoffs, (as claimed by Cargill and Corn) were simply ‘campaign contributions’."

== Personal ==
Napoleon B. Johnson married Martha Lee Webber. The couple had one child, a daughter. He adhered to the Presbyterian faith, and belonged to the Masons, the American Legion, and the Chamber of Commerce.

Johnson reportedly died in 1974.

== See also ==
- National Congress of American Indians
- O. A. Cargill
- N. S. Corn
- Samuel Earl Welch
