= Sargent Prentiss Freeling =

American attorney and politician

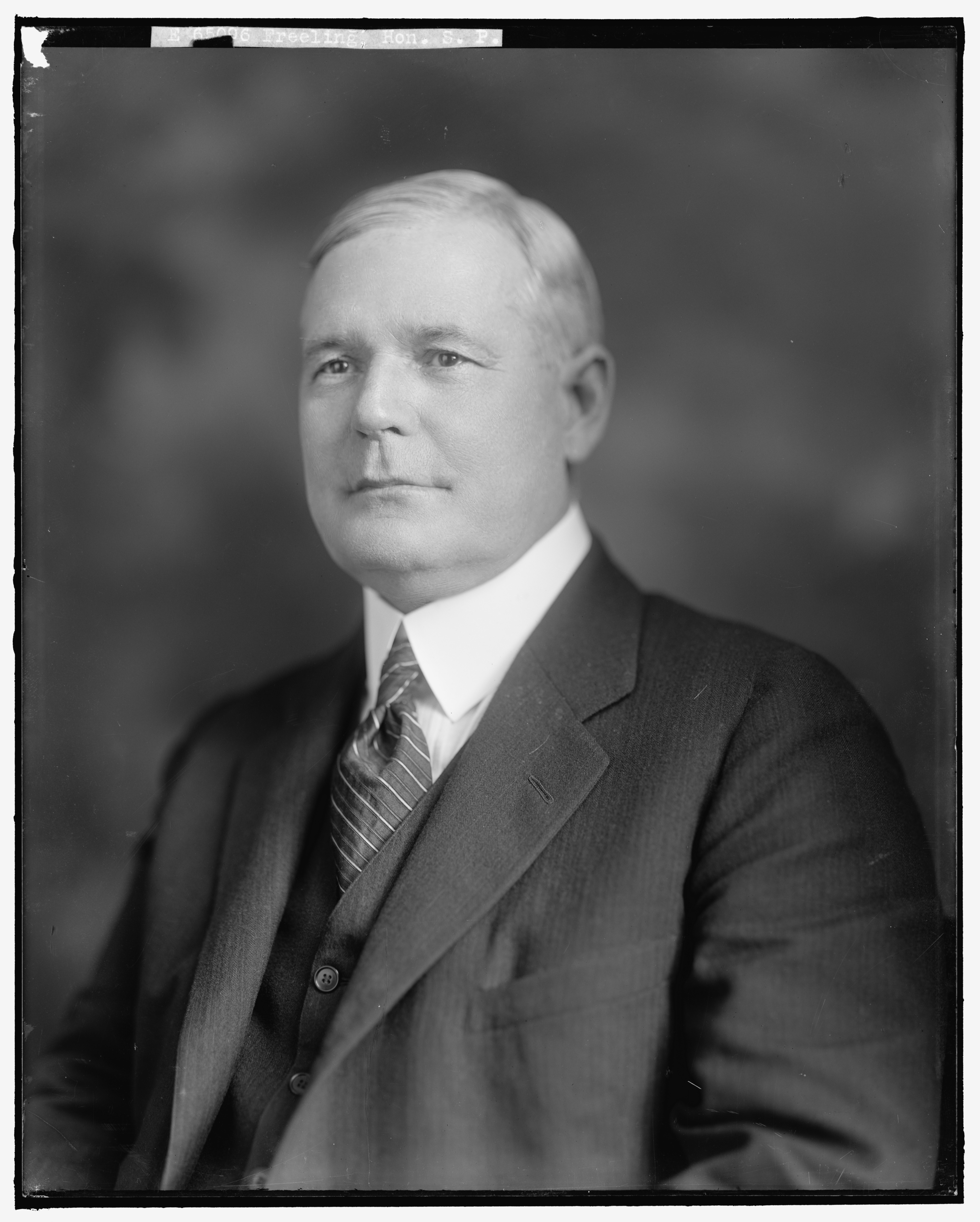

2nd Attorney General of Oklahoma
- In office January 1915 – 1922
- Governor: Robert L. Williams; James B. A. Robertson
- Preceded by: Charles West
- Succeeded by: George F. Short

District attorney for Pottawatomie County, Indian Territory
- In office 1902–1907

Personal details
- Born: January 25, 1874 McNairy, Tennessee
- Died: April 18, 1937 (aged 63) Oklahoma City, Oklahoma
- Resting place: Oklahoma City, Oklahoma
- Political party: Democratic Party
- Education: Southwestern Baptist University; Harvard University

Sargent Prentiss Freeling (January 25, 1874 – April 18, 1937) was an American politician who served as the 2nd attorney general of Oklahoma between 1915 and 1922.

== Early life and education ==
Sargent Prentiss Freeling was born to John William Freeling and Rosa Minerva Cantrell on January 25, 1874, in McNairy, Tennessee. He attended Southwestern Baptist University and graduated from Harvard University in 1899 before attending Southern Law College for one year.

== Move to Oklahoma and political career ==
Freeling moved to Shawnee, Oklahoma in 1900. Shortly after moving, he was admitted to the Oklahoma Bar. He was the elected county attorney for Pottawatomie County from 1902 to statehood. He ran against Charles West for the office of attorney general of Oklahoma in 1907, but lost the election. He would go on to win the race for attorney general in November 1914.

=== Attorney general ===
While attorney general, Freeling lead the Red River litigation which officially establish the border between Oklahoma and Texas. Freeling lead the state investigation of the Tulsa Race Massacre, charged Black Tulsans for the riot, and blamed the riot on Black Tulsans "intimidating white people." He provided arms and ammunition to Glenn Condon and the Tulsa Council of Defense during World War I.

== Later life and death ==
Freeling resigned in 1922 to focus on the Red River litigation. He practiced law in Oklahoma City after his retirement. In 1924, Freeling ran in the 1924 United States Senate election in Oklahoma, but lost the primary. He would later represent the mastermind of the Osage Indian murders, William K. Hale, in his murder trial in 1926.

He died on April 18, 1937, in Oklahoma City, where he was later buried. He never married, had no children, and was survived by a sister in Italy.

Party political offices
Preceded by Charles West	Democratic nominee for Attorney General of Oklahoma; 1914, 1918	Succeeded by George F. Short
