= Harry L. S. Halley =

American judge

Chief Justice of the Oklahoma Supreme Court
- In office 1965–1967
- Preceded by: W. H. Blackbird
- Succeeded by: Floyd L. Jackson
- In office 1953–1955
- Preceded by: Ben Arnold
- Succeeded by: Napoleon B. Johnson

Justice of the Oklahoma Supreme Court
- In office 1949–1967
- Preceded by: T. S. Hurst
- Succeeded by: Rooney McInerney

Personal details
- Born: Harry Lee Stuart Halley; September 5, 1894 Antlers, Oklahoma Territory
- Died: November 25, 1985 (aged 91) Tulsa, Oklahoma
- Parent: John Henry Halley (father)

Harry L. S. Halley (1894-1985), was a life-long Oklahoman who served on the Oklahoma Supreme Court from 1949 to 1967, including two terms (1966–1967) as chief justice. Born in Antlers, Oklahoma, before statehood, when that area was part of the Choctaw Nation, he moved to Tulsa after earning a law degree from the University of Oklahoma and then serving in the U.S. Army during World War I. He was a district court judge in Tulsa from 1931 to 1947. After spending several years in a private law practice, he was named to the state supreme court as an associate justice.

== Military service ==
Harry Lee Stuart Halley was born in Antlers, Oklahoma Territory, on September 5, 1894, to John Henry Halley and Anne Howard Stuart. Halley served in the U.S. Army both World War I and II, and earned three bronze stars. (Note: His highest ranks were captain in World War I and lieutenant colonel in WWII.)He was a Class of 1914 graduate of the Oklahoma University College of Law. Harlow's version of Halley's bio says that he earned both a BA and an LLB degrees from O.U.

After returning from WWI, Halley became a member of the American Legion, and was listed as a charter member of Joe Carson Post 1, which received its charter in Tulsa on June 18, 1919. The charter member group consisted of nine men and one woman who had seen active duty in Europe. Halley served a term as Post Commander during 1931.

== Civic life ==
The Chamber of Commerce decided to support a chapter of the Junior Chamber of Commerce (Jaycees) which would be open to the young service men flooding into Tulsa after WWI. On March 23, 1920, the Tulsa Jaycee chapter was formally organized. The membership consisted of young business and professional men aged between eighteen and thirty-two. Sixty-four men, including Halley joined as charter members. Halley was also put on the board of directors and named as Treasurer.

Halley was nominated to Associate Justice of the Oklahoma Supreme Court in 1948, representing District 6, and served until 1966.

== Death ==
Halley died in Tulsa on November 25, 1985, at age 91. His funeral was held in Boston Avenue Methodist Church.
