= Walter Dean (disambiguation) =

Walter Dean (born 1968) is an American football player. Walter Dean may also refer to:

- Walter Crowder Dean (1865–1952), American politician
- Walter Lofthouse Dean (1854–1912), American marine painter
- Walter Deane (1848–1930), American amateur botanist and ornithologist

== See also ==
- Walter Dean Myers (1937–2014), American writer
- Walter Dean Burnham (1930–2022), American political scientist
- Walter Dean Vargas (born 1971), Filipino Olympic Taekwondo trainer
