= 1934 Oklahoma gubernatorial election =

- November 6, 1934
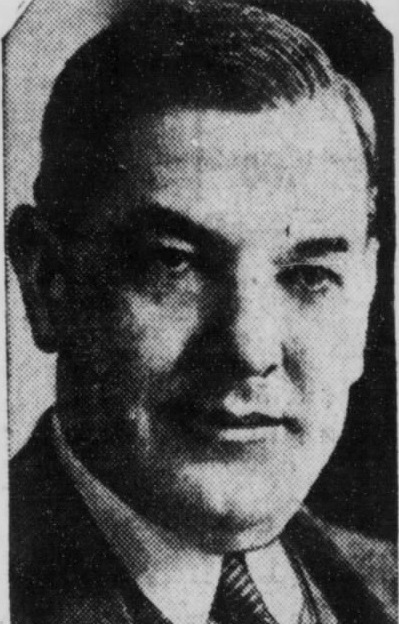

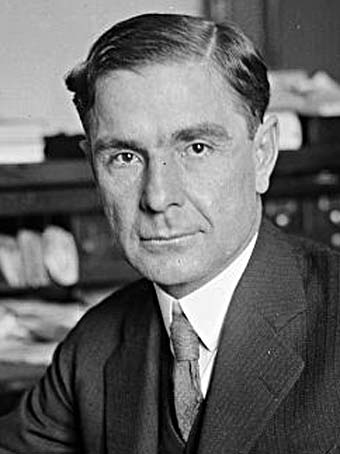
Nominee	E. W. Marland	William B. Pine
Party	Democratic	Republican
Popular vote	365,992	243,841
Percentage	58.25%	38.81%
- County results Marland: 50–60% 60–70% 70–80% Pine: 40–50% 50–60% 60–70%
Governor before election
William H. Murray
Democratic
Elected Governor
E. W. Marland
Democratic

The 1934 Oklahoma gubernatorial election was held on November 6, 1934, and was a race for Governor of Oklahoma. Democrat E. W. Marland defeated Republican William B. Pine. Also on the ballot were S. P. Green of the Socialist Party, Francis M. Simpson of the Progressive Party and four Independent candidates: George G. Ison, Joseph Prather Wheat, Dan W. Womack, and John Franing.

== Primary election ==
=== Democratic party ===
Fifteen candidates sought the Democratic nomination, including former governor Jack C. Walton, Lt. Governor Robert Burns, and Attorney General J. Berry King.

==== Candidates ====
- Tom Anglin, Speaker of the Oklahoma House of Representatives
- Cyrus A. Avery, creator of U.S. Route 66
- Grover Cleveland Brown
- Robert Burns, Lieutenant Governor of Oklahoma
- J. Amon D. Collins
- John Freeman
- J. Berry King, Attorney General of Oklahoma
- John A. MacDonald, member of Oklahoma Senate
- E. W. Marland, representative from Oklahoma's 8th congressional district
- B. M. Nelson
- Porter Newman, judge in Bryan County
- Edwin I. Reeser
- Gomer Smith, attorney and perennial candidate
- J. Oliver Tilly
- Jack Walton, member of Oklahoma Corporation Commission and former governor

==== Results ====
Democratic primary results
Party	Candidate	Votes	%
Democratic	E. W. Marland	156,885	30.55%
Democratic	Tom Anglin	101,698	19.81%
Democratic	Jack Walton	85,616	16.67%
Democratic	J. Berry King	69,811	13.60%
Democratic	Gomer Smith	44,992	8.76%
Democratic	Robert Burns	33,521	6.53%
Democratic	Porter Newman	8,763	1.71%
Democratic	John A. MacDonald	5,025	0.98%
Democratic	R. M. Nelson	1,602	0.31%
Democratic	Cyrus Avery	1,572	0.31%
Democratic	Edwin I. Reeser	1,071	0.21%
Democratic	J. Oliver Tilly	870	0.17%
Democratic	John Freeman	793	0.15%
Democratic	J. Amon D. Collins	736	0.14%
Democratic	Grover Cleveland Brown	531	0.10%
Total votes		513,486	100.00%

Ponca City oilman E. W. Marland and Tom Anglin of Holdenville were headed to a runoff when Anglin withdrew, leaving Marland unopposed.

Democratic primary runoff results
Party	Candidate	Votes	%
Democratic	E. W. Marland	375,572	100.00%
Total votes		375,572	100.00%

=== Republican party ===
Former Senator William B. Pine defeated two challengers by a wide margin to claim the GOP nomination.

==== Candidates ====
- Rexford B. Cragg
- Ray Ferrell
- William B. Pine, former United States Senator from Oklahoma

==== Results ====
Republican primary results
Party	Candidate	Votes	%
Republican	William B. Pine	60,347	87.37%
Republican	Ray Ferrell	4,424	6.41%
Republican	Rexford B. Cragg	4,299	6.22%
Total votes		69,070	100.00%

== General election ==
=== Results ===
1934 Oklahoma gubernatorial election
Party	Candidate	Votes	%	±%
Democratic	E. W. Marland	365,992	58.25%	−0.80%
Republican	William B. Pine	243,841	38.81%	−1.98%
Socialist	S. P. Green	16,688	2.66%	
Progressive	Francis M. Simpson	1,422	0.23%	
Independent	George G. Ison	186	0.03%	
Independent	John Franing	99	0.02%	−0.04%
Independent	Dan W. Womack	70	0.01%	
Independent	John Prather Wheat	33	0.01%	
Total votes		628,331	100.00%	
Majority		122,151	19.44%	
Democratic hold		Swing	+1.18%	

=== Results by county ===
William Pine was the first Republican to win Cherokee County and Rogers County in a gubernatorial election. The former would not vote Republican again until 1986.

County	E. W. Marland Democratic		William B. Pine Republican		S. P. Green Socialist		Francis M. Simpson Progressive		All Others Independent		Margin		Total votes cast
County	#	%	#	%	#	%	#	%	#	%	#	%	Total votes cast
Adair	2,798	45.84%	3,271	53.59%	32	0.52%	1	0.02%	2	0.03%	-473	-7.75%	6,104
Alfalfa	2,378	40.33%	3,399	57.64%	77	1.31%	38	0.64%	5	0.08%	-1,021	-17.31%	5,897
Atoka	3,273	65.91%	1,576	31.74%	112	2.26%	2	0.04%	3	0.06%	1,697	34.17%	4,966
Beaver	1,651	41.35%	2,278	57.05%	34	0.85%	19	0.48%	11	0.28%	-627	-15.70%	3,993
Beckham	3,889	64.32%	1,861	30.78%	286	4.73%	8	0.13%	2	0.03%	2,028	33.54%	6,046
Blaine	3,362	49.12%	3,073	44.90%	387	5.65%	13	0.19%	9	0.13%	289	4.22%	6,844
Bryan	6,360	76.05%	1,892	22.62%	101	1.21%	4	0.05%	6	0.07%	4,468	53.43%	8,363
Caddo	6,396	52.25%	5,066	41.38%	725	5.92%	52	0.42%	3	0.02%	1,330	10.86%	12,242
Canadian	4,173	55.08%	3,078	40.63%	291	3.84%	31	0.41%	3	0.04%	1,095	14.45%	7,576
Carter	7,014	64.01%	3,706	33.82%	226	2.06%	6	0.05%	5	0.05%	3,308	30.19%	10,957
Cherokee	3,489	49.41%	3,518	49.82%	51	0.72%	1	0.01%	3	0.04%	-29	-0.41%	7,062
Choctaw	4,772	74.35%	1,587	24.73%	52	0.81%	5	0.08%	2	0.03%	3,185	49.63%	6,418
Cimarron	1,325	57.24%	956	41.30%	28	1.21%	5	0.22%	1	0.04%	369	15.94%	2,315
Cleveland	4,747	63.48%	2,567	34.33%	146	1.95%	14	0.19%	4	0.05%	2,180	29.15%	7,478
Coal	2,347	74.37%	651	20.63%	153	4.85%	3	0.10%	1	0.06%	1,696	53.74%	3,156
Comanche	5,646	63.96%	2,839	32.16%	305	3.46%	31	0.35%	6	0.07%	2,807	31.80%	8,827
Cotton	3,522	67.99%	1,372	26.49%	278	5.37%	7	0.14%	1	0.02%	2,150	41.51%	5,180
Craig	3,962	52.99%	3,473	46.45%	36	0.48%	4	0.05%	2	0.03%	489	6.54%	7,477
Creek	9,218	51.63%	7,412	41.51%	1,200	6.72%	17	0.10%	8	0.04%	1,806	10.11%	17,855
Custer	4,226	58.53%	2,662	36.87%	294	4.07%	32	0.44%	6	0.08%	1,564	21.66%	7,220
Delaware	2,753	47.59%	2,990	51.69%	39	0.67%	2	0.03%	1	0.02%	-237	-4.10%	5,785
Dewey	1,980	39.92%	2,326	46.90%	631	12.72%	15	0.30%	8	0.16%	-346	-6.98%	4,960
Ellis	1,840	44.73%	2,158	52.46%	95	2.31%	13	0.32%	8	0.19%	-318	-7.73%	4,114
Garfield	7,353	47.64%	7,811	50.61%	123	0.80%	141	0.91%	6	0.04%	-458	-2.97%	15,434
Garvin	4,151	67.03%	1,805	29.15%	232	3.75%	4	0.06%	1	0.02%	2,346	37.88%	6,193
Grady	5,184	62.71%	2,431	29.41%	637	7.71%	12	0.15%	3	0.04%	2,753	33.30%	8,267
Grant	2,951	50.45%	2,815	48.13%	35	0.60%	47	0.80%	1	0.02%	136	2.33%	5,849
Greer	2,850	71.09%	1,078	26.89%	58	1.45%	15	0.37%	8	0.20%	1,772	44.20%	4,009
Harmon	1,809	76.65%	449	19.03%	92	3.90%	9	0.38%	1	0.04%	1,360	57.63%	2,360
Harper	1,455	47.03%	1,575	50.90%	51	1.65%	9	0.29%	4	0.13%	-120	-3.88%	3,094
Haskell	3,737	59.30%	2,543	40.35%	20	0.32%	1	0.02%	1	0.02%	1,194	18.95%	6,302
Hughes	4,068	62.51%	2,317	35.60%	113	1.74%	4	0.06%	6	0.09%	1,751	26.91%	6,508
Jackson	3,613	70.66%	1,227	24.00%	258	5.05%	13	0.25%	2	0.04%	2,386	46.67%	5,113
Jefferson	2,409	60.23%	1,340	33.50%	239	5.98%	8	0.20%	4	0.10%	1,069	26.73%	4,000
Johnston	2,894	73.92%	918	23.45%	100	2.55%	2	0.05%	1	0.03%	1,976	50.47%	3,915
Kay	10,578	65.24%	5,426	33.47%	87	0.54%	117	0.72%	5	0.03%	5,152	31.78%	16,213
Kingfisher	2,947	46.31%	3,380	53.11%	34	0.53%	1	0.02%	2	0.03%	-433	-6.80%	6,364
Kiowa	3,514	60.27%	1,729	29.66%	570	9.78%	17	0.29%	0	0.00%	1,785	30.62%	5,830
Latimer	2,897	67.88%	1,333	31.23%	31	0.73%	3	0.07%	4	0.09%	1,564	36.64%	4,268
Le Flore	7,717	65.13%	4,071	34.36%	54	0.46%	3	0.03%	3	0.03%	3,646	30.77%	11,848
Lincoln	4,863	43.49%	6,097	54.53%	196	1.75%	17	0.15%	8	0.07%	-1,234	-11.04%	11,181
Logan	4,385	45.95%	5,023	52.64%	110	1.15%	18	0.19%	6	0.06%	-638	-6.69%	9,542
Love	1,574	66.44%	641	27.06%	153	6.46%	1	0.04%	0	0.00%	933	39.38%	2,369
Major	1,165	27.74%	2,798	66.62%	174	4.14%	56	1.33%	7	0.17%	-1,633	-38.88%	4,200
Marshall	2,015	74.14%	528	19.43%	165	6.07%	8	0.29%	2	0.07%	1,487	54.71%	2,718
Mayes	3,345	49.56%	3,356	49.72%	40	0.59%	4	0.06%	5	0.07%	-11	-0.16%	6,750
McClain	3,367	67.99%	1,518	30.65%	63	1.27%	3	0.06%	1	0.02%	1,849	37.34%	4,952
McCurtain	4,238	73.74%	1,509	26.26%	0	0.00%	0	0.00%	0	0.00%	2,729	47.49%	5,747
McIntosh	3,854	56.09%	2,951	42.95%	53	0.77%	7	0.10%	6	0.09%	903	13.14%	6,871
Murray	2,902	70.80%	1,099	26.81%	89	2.17%	7	0.17%	2	0.05%	1,803	43.99%	4,099
Muskogee	10,485	58.85%	7,180	40.30%	133	0.75%	11	0.06%	8	0.04%	3,305	18.55%	17,817
Noble	3,077	52.38%	2,738	46.61%	52	0.89%	7	0.12%	0	0.00%	339	5.77%	5,874
Nowata	2,374	46.81%	2,647	52.19%	38	0.75%	11	0.22%	2	0.04%	-273	-5.38%	5,072
Okfuskee	3,806	55.86%	2,142	31.44%	850	12.48%	11	0.16%	4	0.06%	1,664	24.42%	6,813
Oklahoma	30,372	66.90%	14,150	31.17%	642	1.41%	220	0.48%	17	0.04%	16,222	35.73%	45,401
Okmulgee	9,246	60.69%	5,740	37.67%	220	1.44%	24	0.16%	6	0.04%	3,506	23.01%	15,236
Osage	7,500	64.14%	3,964	33.90%	206	1.76%	15	0.13%	8	0.07%	3,536	30.24%	11,693
Ottawa	6,313	56.16%	4,665	41.50%	255	2.27%	6	0.05%	3	0.03%	1,648	14.66%	11,242
Pawnee	2,887	39.79%	3,821	52.66%	526	7.25%	16	0.22%	6	0.08%	-934	-12.87%	7,256
Payne	5,207	48.95%	5,128	48.21%	280	2.63%	18	0.17%	4	0.04%	79	0.74%	10,637
Pittsburg	8,738	70.26%	3,569	28.70%	124	1.00%	5	0.04%	0	0.00%	5,169	41.56%	12,436
Pontotoc	4,580	71.43%	1,706	26.61%	117	1.82%	6	0.09%	3	0.05%	2,874	44.82%	6,412
Pottawatomie	8,657	59.87%	5,533	38.27%	244	1.69%	15	0.10%	10	0.07%	3,124	21.61%	14,459
Pushmataha	2,972	70.49%	1,182	28.04%	53	1.26%	3	0.07%	6	0.14%	1,790	42.46%	4,216
Roger Mills	1,801	53.75%	1,239	36.97%	259	7.73%	10	0.30%	42	1.25%	562	16.77%	3,351
Rogers	3,130	45.52%	3,437	49.99%	302	4.39%	5	0.07%	2	0.03%	-307	-4.46%	6,876
Seminole	7,257	63.93%	3,618	31.87%	461	4.06%	10	0.09%	5	0.04%	3,639	32.06%	11,351
Sequoyah	3,767	52.60%	3,378	47.17%	13	0.18%	2	0.03%	1	0.01%	389	5.43%	7,161
Stephens	3,797	62.25%	1,713	28.08%	587	9.62%	2	0.03%	1	0.02%	2,084	34.16%	6,100
Texas	2,918	61.65%	1,707	36.07%	87	1.84%	20	0.42%	1	0.02%	1,211	25.59%	4,733
Tillman	3,854	79.68%	935	19.33%	37	0.76%	8	0.17%	3	0.03%	2,919	60.35%	4,837
Tulsa	23,900	55.57%	18,128	42.15%	917	2.13%	50	0.12%	16	0.04%	5,772	13.42%	43,011
Wagoner	2,667	51.38%	2,349	45.25%	168	3.24%	5	0.10%	2	0.04%	318	6.13%	5,191
Washington	5,062	53.55%	4,249	44.95%	120	1.27%	12	0.13%	9	0.10%	813	8.60%	9,452
Washita	3,107	59.36%	1,719	32.84%	390	7.45%	17	0.32%	1	0.02%	1,388	26.52%	5,234
Woods	3,068	50.64%	2,795	46.13%	166	2.74%	26	0.43%	4	0.07%	273	4.51%	6,059
Woodward	2,494	44.70%	2,930	52.51%	85	1.52%	37	0.66%	34	0.61%	-436	-7.81%	5,580
Totals	365,992	58.25%	243,841	38.81%	16,688	2.66%	1,422	0.23%	388	0.06%	122,151	19.44%	628,331

==== Counties that flipped from Republican to Democratic ====
- Blaine
- Creek
- Kay
- Oklahoma
- Payne
- Tulsa
- Washington

==== Counties that flipped from Democratic to Republican ====
- Adair
- Beaver
- Cherokee
- Delaware
- Dewey
- Ellis
- Harper
- Lincoln
- Major
- Mayes
- Rogers
