= Williamson v. Lee Optical Co. =

- Supreme Court of the United States

Argued March 2, 1955 Decided March 28, 1955
- Full case name: Mac Q. Williamson, Attorney General of Oklahoma, et al. v. Lee Optical of Oklahoma, Incorporated, et al.
- Citations: 348 U.S. 483 (more) 75 S. Ct. 461; 99 L. Ed. 563; 1955 U.S. LEXIS 1003

Case history
- Prior: Appeal from the United States District Court for the Western District of Oklahoma

Holding
- State laws regulating business are subject to only rational basis review, and the Court need not contemplate all possible reasons for legislation.

Court membership
- Chief Justice Earl Warren Associate Justices Hugo Black · Stanley F. Reed; Felix Frankfurter · William O. Douglas; Harold H. Burton · Tom C. Clark; Sherman Minton · John M. Harlan II

Case opinion
- Majority: Douglas, joined by Warren, Black, Reed, Frankfurter, Burton, Clark, Minton
- Harlan took no part in the consideration or decision of the case.

Laws applied
- U.S. Const. amend. XIV

Williamson v. Lee Optical Co., 348 U.S. 483 (1955), is a United States Supreme Court case holding that state laws regulating business are only subject to rational basis review and that courts need not contemplate all possible reasons for legislation.

== Background ==
A 1953 Oklahoma law (59 Okla. Stat. Ann. §§ 941–947, Okla. Laws 1953, c. 13, §§ 2–8) contained provisions making it unlawful for any person not a licensed optometrist or ophthalmologist to fit lenses to faces or to duplicate or replace lenses or other optical appliances except upon written prescriptive authority of an Oklahoma-licensed optometrist or ophthalmologist. It also required every individual seeking to have eyeglasses made, repaired, or refitted to obtain a prescription. It therefore had a practical negative effect on unlicensed opticians, but exempted sellers of ready-to-wear eyeglasses.

The plaintiff brought suit to have the law declared unconstitutional and to enjoin state officials from enforcing it on equal protection grounds as well as due process grounds for arbitrary interference with an optician's right to do business.

The District Court ruled that portions of §§ 2, 3, and 4 of the Act violated the Due Process Clause of the Fourteenth Amendment to the Constitution and that portions of § 3 of the Act also violated the Equal Protection Clause of the Fourteenth Amendment.

== Decision ==
Justice William O. Douglas wrote the 8–0 majority opinion, joined by every justice apart from John Marshall Harlan II, who did not take part in the case. Douglas affirmed in part and reversed in part, holding that the law's provisions did not violate the Due Process Clause of the Fourteenth Amendment. It also held that the burdening effect on opticians despite that sellers of ready-to-wear eyeglasses were exempted did not violate the Equal Protection Clause.

Douglas found under rational basis review that the Oklahoma state legislature had a legitimate interest in requiring a prescription from a licensed optometrist or ophthalmologist. Although opticians were qualified to refit lenses without prescriptions, the Court reasoned that requiring prescriptions in every case would encourage more frequent eye examinations, which could enable early detection of more serious eye conditions. He wrote that, if a legitimate governmental interest exists, the law can survive a due process challenge.

Douglas further held that there was no equal protection violation because legislatures were permitted to deal with problems "one step at a time, addressing itself to the phase of the problem which seems most acute to the legislative mind." Thus, he argued, the fact that opticians were so impacted while sellers of ready-to-wear glasses were exempted may have been a signal that the sellers did not represent a portion of the problem that loomed large in the legislature's mind. He added that "the prohibition of the Equal Protection Clause goes no further than invidious discrimination. We cannot say that this point has been reached here."

Douglas articulated the standard for determining whether a law survives a due process challenge: "the law need not be in every respect logically consistent with its aims to be constitutional. It is enough that there is an evil at hand for correction, and that it might be thought that the particular legislative measure was a rational way to correct it." He wrote that "the day is gone when this court uses the Due Process Clause of the Fourteenth Amendment to strike down state laws, regulatory of business and industrial conditions, because they may be unwise, improvident, or out of harmony with a particular school of thought."

== See also ==
- List of United States Supreme Court cases, volume 348
