= N. S. Corn =

American judge

Chief Justice of the Oklahoma Supreme Court
- In office 1943–1945
- Preceded by: Earl Welch
- Succeeded by: T. L. Gibson

Justice of the Oklahoma Supreme Court
- In office 1935–1959
- Preceded by: Charles Swindall
- Succeeded by: Pat Irwin

Personal details
- Born: Nelson Smith Corn; March 25, 1884 Tahlequah, Cherokee Nation, Indian Territory
- Died: November 8, 1967 (aged 83) Oklahoma City, US
- Occupation: Teacher, attorney, politician, judge
- Known for: Justice of Oklahoma State Supreme Court (impeached and convicted of bribery)

N. S. Corn, also known as Nelson S. Corn or Nelson Smith Corn, (1884–1967) was a justice on the Oklahoma Supreme Court who was one of the central figures of the Oklahoma Supreme Court Scandal that occurred during the mid-1960s. He was accused of income tax evasion, impeached, tried, convicted, and sentenced to a prison term. During his imprisonment, he prepared a document confessing to his crimes and also provided evidence that led to the resignation or impeachment of additional justices for financial crimes while serving on the court, as well as causing the Oklahoma Legislature to reform the selection of Supreme Court justices.

== Parental family ==
Corn was born March 25, 1884, in Talequah, Oklahoma, which was then known as Talequah, Cherokee Nation, Indian Territory, to Columbus Franklin Corn and Camelia Jane (née Little) Corn. He was the fifth of seven children in the family.

== Early history ==
Corn served as an associate justice for 24 years, from 1934 to 1959, then an additional five years as a supernumerary justice. He attended Southwestern State College at Weatherford, Oklahoma, where he earned a teaching certificate that permitted him to teach school for eight years. He claimed that he had studied law at home after he was elected clerk of Dewey County, Oklahoma, in 1918. Although he failed the bar exam the first time he attempted it, he passed the next time he took it.

Corn was elected Dewey County Attorney, where he served after four years. He later admitted that his resignation was because of "...a little dissatisfaction over a murder case." He did not elaborate on the particulars.

== Bribery on the Supreme Court ==
Corn acquired a financial "angel" early in his career on the Oklahoma Supreme Court. He testified in one proceeding that the prominent and powerful mayor of Oklahoma City, O. A. Cargill gave him $1,500 in 1936 for his campaign fund. (Note: Just two years after he was first elected and four years before Corn was scheduled for reelection.) Corn said that thereafter Cargill gave him $250 each time he ran for reelection. Corn also stated that every time Cargill called him about a case pending before the court, Corn voted on the outcome. The deal was that whenever Corn knew that five other justices planned to vote one way on the outcome of the case, Corn should vote with them to ensure a majority vote. The pattern of voting continued for 19 years.

Corn was accused of accepting a $150,000 bribe to affect the outcome of the so-called Selected Investment Corporation Case. He and Justice Earl Welch were both tried at the same time. He was also charged with evading payment of income taxes for a five-year period of 1957 to 1961. Tried first on tax evasion, he was found guilty and sentenced to a three-year prison term plus a $13,500 fine. (Note: Far from a maximum sentence, which could have been five years in prison and $10,000 fine on each of the five counts.) Trial judge, Roy Harper, denied a new-trial motion by the defense lawyer, telling reporters that, "...I've never tried a tax case that was simpler” or “seen one with less actual defense.”

Corn changed his plea from "not guilty" to "nolo contendere" after U.S. Attorney A. B. Potter announced in court that he had a witness that could testify that Corn was involved in a $150,000 payoff from an unnamed corporation in 1957. (Note: Later identified as the Selected Investment Corporation.) Judge Harper also gave the former justice an 18-month sentence in jail.

=== Corn's early release from prison ===
While serving his 18-month sentence in the Springfield, Missouri federal prison, Corn decided to prepare an affidavit detailing his involvement in the bribery and income tax evasion schemes. After completing the document, he gave it to the government on December 9, 1964. (Note: For health reasons, Corn was released early from prison ten days after turning over the document.) It was then turned over to federal Judge Stephen Chandler, who shared it with the most recently elected Oklahoma Supreme Court Justice, William Berry, who got Representative G. T. Blankenship to present it to the state legislature.

Nelson S. Corn died November 8, 1967. He was buried in the family plot at Rose Hill Burial Park in Oklahoma City.
