= George F. Short =

American lawyer and politician (1889–1973)

3rd Attorney General of Oklahoma
- In office January 1923 – January 1927
- Governor: Jack C. Walton; Martin E. Trapp
- Preceded by: Sargent Prentiss Freeling
- Succeeded by: Ed Dabney

George F. Short (1889 – January 22, 1973) was an American lawyer and politician who served as the third Attorney General of Oklahoma from January 1923 to January 1927.

== Early life, education, and career ==
Born in Breckinridge County, Kentucky, Short moved with his family to Durant, Oklahoma, in 1902. He attended the University of Oklahoma and later worked as a teacher and administrator in schools in Tahlequah, Coalgate, and Weatherford.

He began practicing law in Coalgate and Idabel before being appointed attorney general during the administration of Governor Jack C. Walton.

== Attorney General of Oklahoma ==
Short served as the Attorney General of Oklahoma between 1923 and 1927, succeeding Sargent Prentiss Freeling and preceding Ed Dabney. Appointed at the age of 32, he was the youngest state attorney general in the United States at the time.

As attorney general, Short upheld the authority of the state senate right to impeach then-Governor Walton. He was also a member of the Ku Klux Klan. Short also "drew wide acclaim" for his successful investigation and prosecution of six men who had lynched a black laborer.

After former Tulsa Police Chief John Gustafson advised Short to arrest and prosecute Bryan and Ernest Burkhart for the Osage Indian murders, he declined and he repeatedly delayed calling grand juries to investigated the Burkharts and William King Hale.

Short left office in 1927, returning to private law practice in Oklahoma City.

== Death ==
Short died at Mercy Hospital in Oklahoma City, Oklahoma, at the age of 83. He was buried in Highland Cemetery in Durant. Survivors included his wife, Em K., stepson Dick Trent, and two stepdaughters.
