= Charles R. Nesbitt =

American politician

Charles Nesbitt

Oklahoma Secretary of Energy
- In office 1991–1995
- Governor: David Walters
- Succeeded by: Carl Michael Smith

Oklahoma Corporation Commissioner
- In office 1969–1975
- Governor: Dewey F. Bartlett; David Hall
- Preceded by: Harold Freeman
- Succeeded by: Hamp Baker

9th Attorney General of Oklahoma
- In office 1963–1967
- Governor: Henry Bellmon
- Preceded by: Mac Q. Williamson
- Succeeded by: G. T. Blankenship

Personal details
- Born: August 30, 1921 Miami, Oklahoma
- Died: July 5, 2007 (aged 85) Oklahoma City, Oklahoma
- Party: Democratic
- Spouse: Margôt Nesbitt
- Profession: Lawyer

Charles Rudolph Nesbitt, Jr. (August 30, 1921 – July 5, 2007) was an Oklahoma attorney and politician. He held several political positions in the Oklahoma state government, having served as the 9th Attorney General of Oklahoma (1963–1967), a member of the Oklahoma Corporation Commission (1969–1975), and as Oklahoma Secretary of Energy under Governor David Walters (1991–1995).

== Biography ==
Charles Nesbitt was born in Miami, Oklahoma, on August 30, 1921. His father was Charles Rudolph, Sr., also an attorney, and his mother was Irma Wilhelmi Nesbitt. He had one sister, Ilse Louise. He lived for a while in Tulsa, where he graduated from Central High School. He went on to earn a B.S. in Government from University of Oklahoma in 1942. He attended basic training for the Army at Ft. Sill, Oklahoma, where he became a second lieutenant, after which he served under General George S. Patton as a tank gunnery specialist. (Note: Lt. Nesbitt was stationed in Bavaria immediately after the end of hostilities in WWII.) He retired from the Army in 1950 with the rank of Major. He later enrolled in law school at Yale University and graduated with his Juris Doctor in 1947, shortly after working as a clerk under a district judge, Bower Broaddus. (Note: Judge Broaddus was then on the United States District Court for the Eastern District of Oklahoma.) Nesbitt went into private practice, specializing in oil and gas, and was involved in Oklahoma politics. He retired in 2001.

== Personal ==
Nesbitt met Margôt Dorothy Lord while both were attending the University of Oklahoma. They married in 1948, after he returned from Europe. In 1954, they settled in Heritage Hills, a neighborhood in Oklahoma City, where they continued to reside at the time of his death. Margôt, formerly an Episcopal priest at St. Paul's Cathedral (Oklahoma City), remained in Oklahoma until her death in 2021.

Nesbitt died on July 5, 2007, at the age of 85. Nesbitt was survived by his wife Margôt; three children, Nancy, Douglas, and Carolyn and their spouses; and his grandchildren, Matthew, Anne, Christopher, Philip, Patrick, and Daniel; as well as his sister, Ilse and her family.

== Political office holdings ==
- Oklahoma Attorney General (Democrat) 1962-1967
- Oklahoma Corporation Commissioner 1968-1973
- Oklahoma Energy Secretary 1991-1995

== See also ==
- Bower Slack Broaddus

Political offices
Preceded by Mac Q. Williamson	Attorney General of Oklahoma; 1963–1967	Succeeded by G. T. Blankenship
Preceded by	Oklahoma Corporation Commissioner; 1969–1975	Succeeded by
Preceded by	Oklahoma Secretary of Energy; Under Governor David Walters; 1991–1995	Succeeded by Carl Michael Smith
Party political offices
Preceded by Mac Q. Williamson	Democratic nominee for Attorney General of Oklahoma; 1962	Succeeded by James P. Garrett
