= Randell S. Cobb =

7th Attorney General of Oklahoma
- In office 1943–1946
- Appointed by: Robert S. Kerr
- Governor: Robert S. Kerr
- Preceded by: Mac Q. Williamson
- Succeeded by: Mac Q. Williamson

Randell S. Cobb (c. 1897 – May 13, 1948) was an American politician who served as the 7th Attorney General of Oklahoma. He was appointed by Governor of Oklahoma Robert S. Kerr in 1943 to succeed Mac Q. Williamson who resigned to join the U.S. Army. He left office in 1946.

Cobb died in Oklahoma City on May 13, 1948, at the age of 51.
