= Judicial misconduct =

Instances when a judge acts unethically

Judicial misconduct occurs when a judge acts in ways that are considered unethical or otherwise violate the judge's obligations of impartial conduct.

Actions that can be classified as judicial misconduct include: conduct prejudicial to the effective and expeditious administration of the business of the courts (as an extreme example: "falsification of facts" at summary judgment); using the judge's office to obtain special treatment for friends or relatives; accepting bribes, gifts, or other personal favors related to the judicial office; having improper discussions with parties or counsel for one side in a case; treating litigants or attorneys in a demonstrably egregious and hostile manner; violating other specific, mandatory standards of judicial conduct, such as judicial rules of procedure or evidence, or those pertaining to restrictions on outside income and requirements for financial disclosure; and acting outside the jurisdiction of the court, or performance of official duties if the conduct might have a prejudicial effect on the administration of the business of the courts among reasonable people. Rules of official misconduct also include rules concerning disability, which is a temporary or permanent condition rendering a judge unable to discharge the duties of the particular judicial office.

Even with systems that are supposed to be independent, judicial misconduct exists, oftentimes accompanied by judicial bias. Many scholars recognize judicial bias through personal opinion as an influential factor, but when it interferes with ethical decision-making, it can be considered a case of judicial misconduct. Specifically, judicial misconduct that appears as discriminatory towards targeted groups may cast doubt upon a judge's ability to rule impartially and fairly. Determining the means of this misconduct includes bias about race, gender, ideology, religion, (dis)ability, etc. Scholars have noted that the personal backgrounds of judges directly affect their decision-making in court. Additionally, judges’ personal ideologies, experiences, party affiliation, and similar factors can alter how judges interpret the law. Research reveals that judges differ in their interpretation of the law, potentially influencing the outcomes of some cases. Survey experiments are often conducted to test the existence of this discrimination, identifying if a judge has the ability to rule fairly on a case that includes minority groups they may have targeted in the past.

Scholars identify racial discrimination as judges may hold prejudices against races and ethnicities that alter their decision-making. Examining the impact of race on decision-making in countries (such as the United States and Kenya) highlights racial biases when comparing majority-minority cultural structures. Dominant ethnicities of geographical areas become centralized in judicial courts, but do not proportionally represent minority groups within the area. In the United States, scholars argue that most majority group representation in court falls to white males of higher class, noting that this may reinforce preexisting stereotypes. Studies find that Black individuals and male individuals of low income or low education levels receive significantly longer sentences than white or female individuals with higher income and education level. Notably, not only is racial discrimination prevalent in this system, but gender discrimination as well.

Some scholars identify gender discrimination as a form of judicial misconduct and have linked it to Western tradition and culture. Meanwhile, other scholars argue that judges draw upon personal experience and social assumptions when interpreting the law- both of which may change case outcome. Studies on patterns of judicial outcomes have identified concerns that gender bias affects judicial decision-making. Scholars note a connection between this behavior and the premise of liberal democratic theory, as the lack of sex neutrality within judicial reasoning can result in unequal outcomes. Cases involving sexual harassment, reproductive rights, and sex-based discrimination suggest that the gender of judges may be significant in decision making. Some research suggests that women judges in both federal and state courts are more likely to vote more liberally on gender-related cases; however, other studies find little to no correlation between the type of case and justices’ ruling patterns. Scholars also identify panel effects, in which the presence of women judges brings recognition to gender in cases where it may be prevalent. Related research finds that women judges in minority status on judicial panels do tend to vote more liberally on gender related issues, and show limited evidence of influence by peer male opinions.

== Seletected Jurisdictions ==
=== India ===
Justice C. S. Karnan was sentenced to six months of imprisonment by the Supreme Court of India, holding him guilty of contempt of court. He was the first Indian High Court judge to be sent to prison for contempt while in office.

=== Taiwan ===
In Taiwan, complaints of misconduct against judges are examined by the Judicial Evaluation Committee established by the Judges Act of 2011, which includes attorneys, scholars and other members from outside the judiciary. Since amendments that took effect in 2020, parties to concluded cases and victims of crime may petition it directly. A judge's opinion on the application of law may not itself be a ground for evaluation. Cases requiring discipline are heard by the Disciplinary Chamber of the Judiciary, whose sanctions range from reprimand to removal from office with permanent disqualification from public service.

=== United Kingdom ===
In the UK, judicial misconduct is investigated by the Judicial Conduct Investigations Office.

=== United States ===
A judicial investigative committee is a panel of judges selected to investigate a judicial misconduct complaint against a judge accused of judicial misconduct. Judicial investigative committees are rarely appointed. According to U.S. Court statistics, only 18 of the 1,484 judicial misconduct complaints filed in the United States Courts between September 2004 and September 2007 resulted in the formation of judicial investigative committees.

==== Notable cases and misconduct allegations ====
- 1965 Oklahoma Supreme Court scandal
- Michigan Supreme Court Justice Diane Hathaway
- United States Supreme Court Justice Samuel Chase, who was acquitted on articles of impeachment
- Chief Justice of the Alabama Supreme Court Roy Moore
- Chief Justice of the New Hampshire Supreme Court David A. Brock
- District Judge Shelley M. Richmond Joseph
- Kids for cash scandal
- New Jersey Appellate Division Judge Carmen H. Alvarez, widow of Atlantic County Judge Edgar R Holmes, sued in United States Federal Court for conspiring with Mercer County Superior Court Judge Mary Jacobson and others to violate and deprive Plaintiff Jon S. Ehrlich of his civil rights. Another defendant, Camden New Jersey Superior Court Judge Michael J. Kassel, was later reprimanded for being unprepared; failing to maintain impartiality; and acting unprofessionally. Kassel's statement of ignorance of the law and comments about not reading the papers, cited in the ACJC complaint against him, were identical to what he previously told Plaintiff when he dismissed a legal malpractice claim against one negligent attorney, while simultaneously failing to bother ruling on 2/3 of Plaintiff's counts. Despite the failures of Kassel, as part of the conspiracy to shield the court and corrupt colleagues, Judge Alvarez affirmed Kassel's decision. In furthering the conspiracy, Judge Alvarez affirmed Judge Jacobson's decision disregarding Judge Dennis McInerney's commission of Federal and state crimes in looting and dissipating the assets of a multi-million dollar estate after being appointed as CTA by his close friend Burlington County Superior Court Judge Michael Hogan, who acted in direct violation of various iterations of NJ Court Directive 11-18 and the NJ Code of Judicial Conduct. The Federal suit was dismissed with 3rd Circuit Appeal based on Absolute Immunity, a doctrine that has been galvanized by judges for judges over hundreds of years.
- Burlington County, New Jersey Presiding Municipal Judge Dennis P. McInerney- Federal judge blasts township court for jailing man who couldn't pay littering fine
- In re James D. Heiple, No. 97 CC 1 (4/30/1997) (Respondent, Chief Justice of the Illinois Supreme Court, was censured for conduct that is prejudicial to the administration of justice and brings the judicial office into disrepute for violating the Code of Judicial Conduct, Illinois Supreme Court Rules 61 and 62(A). Specifically, Respondent belligerently volunteered information that he was a member of the judiciary (e.g., "Do you know who you are talking to?" "Do you know who I am?") after being detained by police who suspected that he had violated traffic laws. Moreover, on three occasions, Respondent displayed an Illinois Supreme Court Justice identification credential to law enforcement to avoid receiving traffic citations. Respondent knew or should have known that communicating such information was likely to influence the officers who were investigating him and would be perceived by them as an attempt to use his judicial office to preclude being charged with traffic violations.)

== See also ==
- Disbarment
- Duty to report misconduct
- Gross negligence
- Judicial activism
- Judicial corruption
- Judicial immunity
- Judicial interpretation
- Judicial murder
- Kangaroo court
- Legal abuse
- Malfeasance in office
- Misfeasance in public office
- Sentencing disparity
- State liability
