= Larry Derryberry =

American politician (1939–2016)

11th Attorney General of Oklahoma
- In office January 11, 1971 – January 8, 1979
- Governor: David Hall; David Boren
- Preceded by: G. T. Blankenship
- Succeeded by: Jan Eric Cartwright

Speaker pro tempore of the Oklahoma House of Representatives
- In office January 7, 1969 – January 5, 1971

Member of the Oklahoma House of Representatives from the 52nd district
- In office January 5, 1965 – January 5, 1971
- Preceded by: District created
- Succeeded by: Howard Cotner

Member of the Oklahoma House of Representatives from the Jackson district
- In office January 8, 1963 – January 5, 1965
- Preceded by: Maurice Willis
- Succeeded by: District abolished

Personal details
- Born: Larry R. Derryberry; April 22, 1939; Altus, Oklahoma, U.S.
- Died: November 19, 2016 (aged 77); Oklahoma City, Oklahoma, U.S.
- Political party: Democratic
- Spouse: Gale Brazil (m. 1963)
- Children: 2
- Parent(s): Willis Landrum Derryberry; Willene Faye Woodall Derryberry
- Education: University of Oklahoma (BA); University of Oklahoma College of Law (JD)
- Occupation: Politician, lawyer

Larry R. Derryberry (April 22, 1939 – November 19, 2016) was an American politician and lawyer who served as the 11th Attorney General of Oklahoma from 1971 to 1979. He previously served in the Oklahoma House of Representatives from 1963 to 1971.

== Early life and education ==
Derryberry was born in Altus, Oklahoma, on April 22, 1939, to Willis Landrum Derryberry and Willene Faye Woodall Derryberry. He graduated from high school as salutatorian of his class.

Derryberry subsequently attended the University of Oklahoma, receiving a Bachelor of Arts in history in 1961 and his Juris Doctor from the University of Oklahoma College of Law in 1963.

== Career ==
Derryberry was elected to the Oklahoma House of Representatives during his second year of law school. He served from 1963 to 1971 as a Democrat, representing the Jackson district from 1963 to 1965 and the 52nd legislative district of Oklahoma from 1965 to 1971.

During his time in office, Derryberry chaired the Joint Committee on Congressional Redistricting. He also served as both Assistant Majority Floor Leader and speaker pro tempore.

In 1970, Larry was elected the 11th Attorney General of Oklahoma, serving from 1971 to 1979. Following his tenure, Larry continued practicing law in Oklahoma City.

== Personal life and death ==
Derryberry married Gale Brazil in 1963. They had two children, a son and daughter.

Derryberry died at the age of 77 in Oklahoma City on November 19, 2016.

== Legacy ==
A book about Derryberry, Courage Counts: The Life of Larry Derryberry, was written by historian Bob Burke and published by the Oklahoma Historical Society.

Party political offices
Preceded by James P. Garrett	Democratic nominee for Attorney General of Oklahoma; 1970, 1974	Succeeded by Jan Eric Cartwright
Oklahoma House of Representatives
Preceded by Maurice Willis	Member of the Oklahoma House of Representatives from the Jackson district 1963–1965	Succeeded by District abolished
Oklahoma House of Representatives
Preceded by District created	Member of the Oklahoma House of Representatives from the 52nd district 1965–1971	Succeeded by Howard Cotner
Oklahoma House of Representatives
Preceded by —	Speaker pro tempore of the Oklahoma House of Representatives; 1969–1971	Succeeded by —
Political offices
Preceded by G. T. Blankenship	11th Attorney General of Oklahoma; 1971–1979	Succeeded by Jan Eric Cartwright
