= Howard Cotner =

American politician (1925–2011)

Member of the Oklahoma House of Representatives from the 52nd district
- In office 1971–1997
- Preceded by: Larry Derryberry
- Succeeded by: David Braddock

Personal details
- Born: August 10, 1925 Wichita Falls, Texas, U.S.
- Died: August 8, 2011 (aged 85) Lawton, Oklahoma, U.S.
- Party: Democratic
- Children: 3
- Education: University of Oklahoma

Howard Cotner (August 10, 1925 – August 8, 2011) was an American politician. He served as a Democratic member for the 52nd district of the Oklahoma House of Representatives.

== Life and career ==
Cotner was born in Wichita Falls, Texas, the son of Wilma Clare Bodenhamer and Hugh Henry Cotner. He attended the University of Oklahoma.

In 1971, Cotner was elected to represent the 52nd district of the Oklahoma House of Representatives, succeeding Larry Derryberry. He served until 1997, when he was succeeded by David Braddock.

Cotner died in August 2011 at the Comanche County Memorial Hospital in Lawton, Oklahoma, at the age of 85.
