= Office of the Oklahoma Attorney General =

Office of the Attorney General State of Oklahoma
- Great Seal of Oklahoma

Agency overview
- Formed: November 17, 1907
- Preceding agency: Office of the Territorial Attorney General
- Headquarters: 313 NE 21 Street; Oklahoma City, Oklahoma
- Employees: 194
- Annual budget: $25.2 million
- Agency executive: Gentner Drummond, Attorney General of Oklahoma
- Website: Office of the Attorney General

The Office of the Attorney General (OAG) is an agency of the Oklahoma state government that is headed by the Attorney General of Oklahoma. The OAG is responsible for supervising the administration of justice across the State, providing legal assistance to the State government, and prosecuting violators of State law.

The 17th Attorney General of Oklahoma was Scott Pruitt, who assumed that post on January 10, 2011. On December 7, 2016, President-elect Donald Trump selected Pruitt to be his nominee as the next Administrator of the Environmental Protection Agency. Pruitt was confirmed by the United States Senate as EPA Administrator on February 17, 2017. Governor Mary Fallin appointed Mike Hunter as his successor as Attorney General on February 20, 2017. Hunter served as Attorney General until his resignation on June 1, 2021. Governor Kevin Stitt appointed John M. O’Connor as his successor as Attorney General on July 23, 2021. O'Connor ran for a full term in 2022, but was narrowly defeated in the Republican Primary by Tulsa-based attorney Gentner Drummond.

== Divisions ==
The office of the Attorney General is divided into several units:

- Attorney General
  - First Assistant Attorney General
    - Civil Division
      - Consumer Protection Unit - Provides mediation services to consumers to help resolve complaints against businesses. The Division can also provide information about complaints that have been filed against businesses, and provide publications to help you make good decisions in the marketplace. The Division also brings law enforcement actions against businesses that harm large numbers of Oklahoma consumers through unfair and deceptive practices.
      - Environmental Protection Unit - Division active in every area of environmental and natural resources law. Unit personnel protect the state's air, land, water and natural resources from pollution by investigating allegations of pollution and aggressively seeking remedies in both criminal and civil courts. The unit also provides legal advice and representation to state environmental agencies and chairs the Environmental Crimes Task Force, a collection of state, federal and local agencies united for the purpose of coordinating investigations and assuring efficient use of resources.
      - General Counsel Unit - A major function of the Attorney General is to assists public officials in the performance of their duties, seeking to provide the best legal advice possible for the good of the State and its citizens. Most Attorney General Opinions are written by members of the General Counsel Unit. These opinions are binding on state agencies unless overturned by a ruling from a court of competent jurisdiction. General Counsel Attorneys review Interlocal Agreements and examine and pass on any security issued by a county, municipality, township or other political subdivision. General Counsel Attorneys assist their clients in interpreting and following the Open Records Act and the Open Meeting Act and may assist in investigating and presenting a case against a particular professional licensee, or act as a hearing advisor to the licensure board during discipline proceedings. In addition to several specialized duties, the General Counsel Unit provides day-to-day legal advice for state agencies, boards and commissions. For many entities, the assistant attorney general is the sole provider of legal advice and services. For others, the assistant attorney general is a liaison available in addition to the agency's in-house counsel.
      - Litigation Section - The civil trial division for the Office of the Attorney General and main function of the office. This section defends and prosecutes civil matters for the state and its agencies, officers and employees. Litigation on behalf of the state is supported in every county, the Oklahoma Supreme Court, every federal district court in the state, the 10th Circuit Court of Appeals, the U. S. Supreme Court and in other states and foreign jurisdictions. The Office of the Attorney General defends state employees when sued for civil rights actions taken during their official duties. A majority of the more complicated and costly trials come from allegations surrounding the hiring, firing and promotion of state employees. The Litigation Section also has the responsibility to handle and direct the major class action litigation filed against institutions, including the challenges to the juvenile justice system. The unit represents state judicial officers, District Attorneys, Legislators, and the executive branch of state government when sued in both their official and individual capacities. The Litigation Section is also responsible for tracking the hiring of private attorneys by other state agencies and reporting the costs to state agencies for services provided by private attorneys.
      - Public Utilities Unit - Unit represents and protects the interests of the state's utility customers in rate-related proceedings. The unit also participates in utility-related task forces.
    - Criminal Division
      - Criminal Appeals Section - As in civil matter, the Attorney General represents the state in the criminal appeals process to ensure that the decisions rendered by judges and juries are upheld in the appellate courts. The unit works to uphold the convictions of the guilty and ensures that the punishment imposed by judges and juries are carried out. Unit attorneys provide quality responses that aid the court in ruling on issues of law and in the development of new legal precedents.
      - Multicounty Grand Jury Unit - The Multicounty Grand Jury Unit investigates and prosecutes cases ranging from homicide to narcotics violations. The unit also administers all aspects of the Multicounty Grand Jury.
      - Patient Abuse and Medicaid Fraud Control Unit - This Unit investigates and prosecutes Medicaid fraud and provider abuse, neglect and financial exploitation in Medicaid facilities.
      - Workers' Compensation and Insurance Fraud Unit - Section charged with controlling fraud in worker's compensation by: holding claimants accountable for providing truthful information; holding doctors accountable for accurately and completely documenting evidence supporting diagnoses; holding attorneys accountable as officers of the Court to expedite valid claims and prevent and report fraudulent clams or activities; holding insurance companies accountable for reporting suspected fraud, for paying claims without investigation, and for paying fraudulent claims; and holding the Workers' Compensation Court accountable for ensuring the legality and fairness of the disposition of claims. This mission shall be accomplished by identification and aggressive investigation and prosecution of violations of criminal statutes; by continuous interaction with the public, employers, insurance professionals and other law enforcement officers by providing education and training about workers' compensation fraud; and by analyzing the workers' compensation system in order to make recommendations for amendments and new legislation.
      - Victim Services Unit - Section that keeps family members informed of the status of capital cases.
      - Tobacco Enforcement Unit - Section that enforces the tobacco laws of the State.
    - Office of Civil Rights Enforcement - Promotes equality through education and enforcement in the areas of employment, housing, and places of public accommodation regardless of race, color, sex, religion, national origin, disability, and age.

== Staffing ==
The Attorney General's Office, with an annual budget of over $20 million, is one of the smaller employers of the State. For fiscal year 2009, the AG's Office was authorized 179 full-time employees.

Division	Number of Employees
Administration	27
Legal Services Consumer Protection Criminal Appeals Environmental Protection General Counsel Litigation Public Utilities	98
Financial Fraud and Special Investigations Unit	10
Patient Abuse and Medicaid Fraud Control Unit	20
Workers' Compensation and Insurance Fraud Unit	13
Victims Services Unit	6
Tobacco Enforcement Unit	5
Civil Rights Enforcement Office	15
Total	194

== Budget ==
The Attorney General's Office, as are most agencies of the State, is funded by yearly appropriations from the Oklahoma Legislature. 57% of the Office's $25 million annual budget comes from the States' yearly appropriations. 18% of the budget comes from the Attorney General's Revolving Fund, which is composed of fees the Attorney General charges other State agencies to perform legal services on their behalf. The remaining 25% comes from various special funds.

On the expenditure side, most ($14 million or 58%) of the Attorney General's Office budget is spent on salaries and benefits for the employees of the Office. $6.6 million (28%) consists of payments to local governments to aid them in the performance of their legal duties. The remaining $3.4 million (14%) is dedicated to the administrative and operational expenses needed to run the Office.

For fiscal year 2011, the operating units of the Attorney General's Office had the following operating budgets:

Division	Funding (in millions)
Administration	$2.8
Legal Services Consumer Protection Criminal Appeals Environmental Protection General Counsel Litigation Public Utilities	$8.2
Financial Fraud and Special Investigations Unit	$0.7
Patient Abuse and Medicaid Fraud Control Unit	$1.8
Workers' Compensation and Insurance Fraud Unit	$1.1
Victims Services Unit	$7.3
Tobacco Enforcement Unit	$0.4
Civil Rights Enforcement Office	$1.2
Other	$2.8
Total	$25.2

== See also ==
- Oklahoma Department of Public Safety
- Oklahoma State Bureau of Investigation
- Oklahoma Department of Corrections
- United States Department of Justice
