= Ed Dabney =

Attorney General of Oklahoma 1927–1931

Edwin Dabney
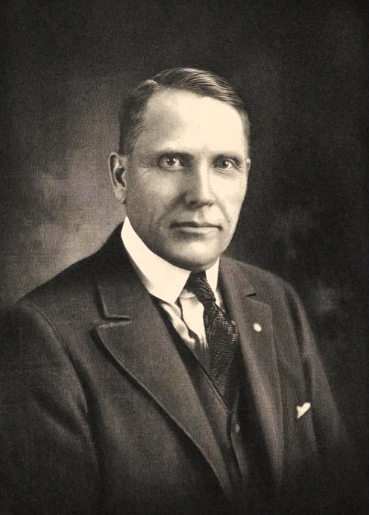
- Dabney in the 1920s

4th Attorney General of Oklahoma
- In office January 1927 – January 1931
- Governor: Henry S. Johnston; William J. Holloway
- Preceded by: George F. Short
- Succeeded by: J. Berry King

Member of the Oklahoma House of Representatives from the Jackson County district
- In office November 16, 1918 – November 16, 1922

Personal details
- Born: February 3, 1882; Comanche County, Texas
- Political party: Democratic Party
- Education: Howard Payne College; University of Texas

Edwin Dabney was an American politician who served as the Attorney General of Oklahoma between 1927 and 1931.

== Biography ==
Edwin Dabney was born on February 3, 1882, in Comanche County, Texas, to Edwin and Mamie G. Dabney. He attended primary school in Comanche County before attending high school in Blankett, Texas. He attended Howard Payne College and the University of Texas, where he earned his law degree. He practiced law in Comanche County before being elected county judge. In 1910, he moved to Oklahoma, was an active member of the Democratic Party, and was elected to the 7th Oklahoma Legislature and 8th Oklahoma Legislature. He served four years as an assistant attorney general. He served as the Attorney General of Oklahoma between 1927 and 1931.

Party political offices
Preceded by George F. Short	Democratic nominee for Attorney General of Oklahoma; 1926	Succeeded by J. Berry King
