= Stephen Sanders Chandler Jr. =

American judge

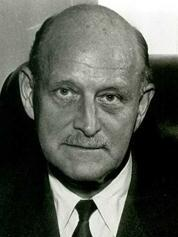

Senior Judge of the United States District Court for the Western District of Oklahoma
- In office October 20, 1975 – April 27, 1989

Chief Judge of the United States District Court for the Western District of Oklahoma
- In office 1956–1969
- Preceded by: Edgar Sullins Vaught
- Succeeded by: Luther L. Bohanon

Judge of the United States District Court for the Western District of Oklahoma
- In office May 13, 1943 – October 20, 1975
- Appointed by: Franklin D. Roosevelt
- Preceded by: Seat established by 54 Stat. 219
- Succeeded by: Ralph Gordon Thompson

Personal details
- Born: Stephen Sanders Chandler Jr. September 13, 1899 Blount County, Tennessee, U.S.
- Died: April 27, 1989 (aged 89) New York City, New York, U.S.
- Education: University of Kansas School of Law (LL.B.)

Stephen Sanders Chandler Jr. (September 13, 1899 – April 27, 1989) was a United States district judge of the United States District Court for the Western District of Oklahoma.

== Education and career ==
Born in Blount County, Tennessee, Chandler received a Bachelor of Laws from University of Kansas School of Law in 1922. He was in private practice of law in Oklahoma City, Oklahoma, from 1922 to 1943.

== Federal judicial service ==
Chandler was nominated by President Franklin D. Roosevelt on February 1, 1943, to the United States District Court for the Western District of Oklahoma, to a new seat created by 54 Stat. 219. He was confirmed by the United States Senate on May 10, 1943, and received his commission on May 13, 1943. He served as chief justice from 1956 to 1969. He assumed senior status on October 20, 1975. His service was terminated on April 27, 1989, due to his death. He had a reputation for contentiousness and in his treatment of counsel, he could be short and cutting.

He was charged by a local district attorney for the unlawful appropriation of land, even though there was little evidence to support the charge and it appeared that the district attorney acted more out of a vendetta than fidelity to the state laws. Nonetheless, by 1965 Oklahoma's public could read that Chandler had been accused of a crime, and had also bullied the United States Attorney into prosecuting a local attorney that Chandler believed had committed perjury. Moreover, Chandler published a law review article damning the United States Court of Appeals for the Tenth Circuit, the very appellate court which accepted appeals from his court. The 89th United States Congress had established the Ad Hoc Special Subcommittee on Judicial Behavior of the House Committee on the Judiciary, which ran an impeachment inquiry investigating Chandler.

=== Suspension ===
The Judicial Council of the United States Court of Appeals for the Tenth Circuit suspended him from his duties. The Supreme Court upheld this action in Chandler v. Judicial Council of Tenth Circuit, 398 U.S. 74 (1970). However the Court's decision, authored by Chief Justice Warren Burger, has been criticized for permitting judicial administrative bodies such as the Judicial Councils and the Judicial Conference (as well as state equivalents) to encroach into state legislative duties and limit judicial independence. This was precisely the argument made by Justice Hugo Black and Justice William O. Douglas in their cutting dissent. (Note: His obituary in the New York Times said that the Judicial Council had relieved him from his duties for one month, saying that Chandler was "...unable or unwilling to discharge efficiently the duties of his office." He appealed the decision to the Supreme Court, and was reinstated.) On the other hand, the Court's decision has been used as a model for judicial discipline, not only in the United States, but also in Canada in the case of Justice Leo Landreville on the Ontario Supreme Court.

=== Personal issues ===
Chandler had other professional incidents:

- He testified before a United States Senate subcommittee hearing in 1962 that he was, "...afraid of being poisoned, that his telephone was tapped and that his fellow judges sometimes cursed him."
- Twice he was removed from hearing lawsuits because of allegations of personal interest or bias and prejudice.
- He was indicted by an Oklahoma grand jury in 1965 on charges of conspiring to have his private road paved by the county. The charge was dismissed.
- He once barred the United States Attorney in Oklahoma City and five other Oklahoma City lawyers from practicing in Federal Court. The Federal appeals court overturned the ruling.

=== Other service ===
Chandler was a member of the law faculty for Oklahoma City University from 1957 to 1960.

== Role in exposing Oklahoma Supreme Court scandal (1965) ==
Chandler worked with Oklahoma Judge William A. Berry to expose corruption on the Oklahoma Supreme Court after reading a confidential testimony by one of the accused justices. He supported Berry's recommendation that they allow Oklahoma lawmaker, G. T. Blankenship, to make a speech about the contents in an open session of the Oklahoma House of Representatives on January 21, 1965. The House soon approved a formal investigation that led to the impeachment and indictment of Justices N. B. Johnson and Earl Welch.

== Other activities ==
- Chairman of the Judicial Administration of the American Bar Association, 1959-60.
- Member of the Governing council of the Inter-American Bar Association, 1956-1973.

== Family ==
Chandler married Margaret Patterson in 1922. She predeceased him. They had one daughter and two sons.

== Death ==
According to the New York Times, Judge Chandler died April 27, 1989, in an unnamed New York city hospital. The cause of death was not stated, but the paper reported that he had been suffering from pneumonia and ulcers. The Tulsa World reported that Chandler had died in Presbyterian Hospital in New York City while being treated for pneumonia and bleeding ulcer for about two weeks. His grandson, Stephen Chandler Sims, told the World that the judge had been treated for a bleeding ulcer during the previous summer.

== See also ==
- List of United States federal judges by longevity of service

== Sources ==
Legal offices
| Preceded by Seat established by 54 Stat. 219 | Judge of the United States District Court for the Western District of Oklahoma; 1943–1975 | Succeeded by Ralph Gordon Thompson |
| Preceded by Edgar Sullins Vaught | Chief Judge of the United States District Court for the Western District of Oklahoma; 1956–1969 | Succeeded by Luther L. Bohanon |
