= J. Berry King =

American politician

5th Attorney General of Oklahoma
- In office 1929 – January 1935
- Governor: Henry S. Johnston; William J. Holloway; William H. Murray
- Preceded by: Ed Dabney
- Succeeded by: Mac Q. Williamson

Personal details
- Born: Harrison, Arkansas
- Party: Democratic
- Education: University of Arkansas; University of Virginia School of Law

Military service
- Branch/service: United States Army
- Rank: Major
- Battles/wars: World War I

J. Berry King was an American politician who served as the 5th Attorney General of Oklahoma between 1929 and 1935.

== Biography ==
J. Berry King was born in Harrison, Arkansas. He graduated from the University of Arkansas in 1907 and the University of Virginia School of Law in 1910. His first law job was alongside William Wirt Hastings in Tahlequah. He enlisted during World War I as a private after 22 in months he left the United States Army as a major and judge advocate general. After the war he moved to Muskogee, Oklahoma, and opened his own law practice. Woodrow Wilson appointed him U.S. Attorney for the Eastern District of Oklahoma. In 1925 he was appointed assistant attorney general. In 1929 he was appointed the 5th Attorney General of Oklahoma and in 1931 he won reelection. He ran in the 1934 Oklahoma gubernatorial election, losing the Democratic primary. He died November 24, 1962. He married Sadye Thompson.
