= Mac Q. Williamson =

American politician

- Williamson ca.1955

6th and 8th Attorney General of Oklahoma
- In office January 1935 – September 1943
- Governor: E. W. Marland; Leon C. Phillips; Robert S. Kerr
- Preceded by: J. Berry King
- Succeeded by: Randell S. Cobb
- In office 1946 – January 1963
- Governor: Roy J. Turner; Johnston Murray; Raymond D. Gary; J. Howard Edmondson; George Nigh
- Preceded by: Randell S. Cobb
- Succeeded by: Charles R. Nesbitt

11th President pro tempore of the Oklahoma Senate
- In office 1927–1929
- Preceded by: William J. Holloway
- Succeeded by: C. S. Storms

Member of the Oklahoma Senate from the 19th district
- In office 1925–1932
- Preceded by: W. H. Woods
- Succeeded by: Homer Paul

Personal details
- Born: November 13, 1889 Nebraska City, Nebraska, U.S.
- Died: November 15, 1964 (aged 75) Oklahoma City, Oklahoma, U.S.
- Resting place: Pauls Valley, Oklahoma, U.S.
- Party: Democratic
- Education: University of Oklahoma College of Law

Mac Q. Williamson (October 13, 1889 – October 15, 1964) was an American politician who served in the Oklahoma Senate and as Attorney General for the State of Oklahoma.

== Early life and career ==
Williamson was born in Nebraska City, Nebraska, and moved with his family to Oklahoma City in 1905. They settled in Pauls Valley in 1906. He was admitted to the first class of the University of Oklahoma College of Law, then known as the Oklahoma University Law School, where he graduated in 1910. He became a member of the Oklahoma Bar in 1913. In 1914, he ran for Pauls Valley city attorney and won the position. In 1920, he ran for and won the Garvin County attorney position. He was reelected to the same job two years later. He was elected to the Oklahoma Senate in 1925, where he served until 1932. During 1928, he also served as president pro tempore for a year. In 1932, he ran for his first statewide office and in 1934 he won the race for Attorney General for the State of Oklahoma. Reelected seven times, he remained in this office until he retired in 1963. His 25 years in office are the longest of any Oklahoma Attorney General.

== Death ==
Williamson died at age 75 on October 15, 1964, at his home in Oklahoma City. He was buried in Mount Olivet Cemetery in Pauls Valley.

== See also ==
- Williamson v. Lee Optical Co.

Party political offices
Preceded by J. Berry King	Democratic nominee for Attorney General of Oklahoma; 1934, 1938, 1942, 1946, 1950, 1954, 1958	Succeeded by Charles R. Nesbitt
