= Charles West (Oklahoma politician) =

American politician

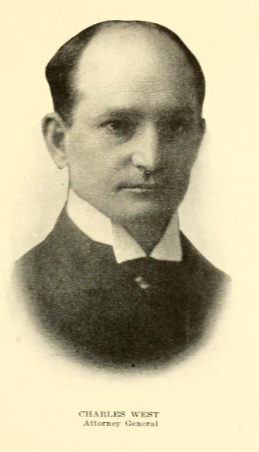
- Charles West in 1912

1st Attorney General of Oklahoma
- In office November 16, 1907 – January 1915
- Governor: Charles N. Haskell; Lee Cruce
- Preceded by: Position established
- Succeeded by: Sargent Prentiss Freeling

Personal details
- Born: March 16, 1872 Savannah, Georgia
- Party: Democratic Party

Charles West was an American politician who served as the first attorney general of Oklahoma from 1907 to 1915.

== Biography ==
Charles West was born in Savannah, Georgia, on March 16, 1872. He graduated from Johns Hopkins University in 1891 and pursued post-graduate work at the University of Leipzig. He was admitted to the Oklahoma Territory bar in 1895 and practiced in Pound Creek and Enid. He served in the Oklahoma National Guard between 1898 and 1910. He was the first attorney general of Oklahoma between 1907 and 1915. He was the president of the National Association of Attorneys General from 1911 to 1912. He is one of the only public attorneys to represent a Catholic school as an official act of office in the United States.

== Electoral history ==
1907 Oklahoma attorney general election
Party	Candidate	Votes	%	±%
Democratic	Charles West	131,055	54.5	New
Republican	Silas H. Reid	99,543	41.4	New
Socialist	E.T. Marsh	9,534	3.9	New
Democratic gain from		Swing	N/A	

Oklahoma attorney general Democratic primary (August 2, 1910)
Party	Candidate	Votes	%
Democratic	Charles West (incumbent)	43,893	40.1%
Democratic	J.C. Graham	34,716	31.8%
Democratic	George D. Key	30,579	28.1%
Turnout		109,188	

1910 Oklahoma attorney general election
Party	Candidate	Votes	%	±%
Democratic	Charles West (incumbent)	119,586	50.5%	−4.0%
Republican	Joseph M. Dodson	93,749	39.5%	−1.9%
Socialist	F. M. Alee	23,513	9.9%	+6.0%
Democratic hold		Swing		

Party political offices
First	Democratic nominee for Attorney General of Oklahoma; 1907, 1910	Succeeded by Sargent Prentiss Freeling
