= John Henry Halley =

American politician (1828–1898)

Member of the Illinois House of Representatives
- In office 1874–1877

Member of the Missouri House of Representatives
- In office 1858–1860

Personal details
- Born: July 9, 1828 Bedford County, Virginia, U.S.
- Died: January 1898 Oklahoma Territory, U.S.
- Spouse(s): Lucy Thompson Annie Howard Stuart (m. 1883)
- Children: 8, including Harry L. S. Halley

John Henry Halley was an American politician and judge who served in the Missouri House of Representatives from 1858 to 1860 and in the Illinois House of Representatives from 1874 to 1877.

== Biography ==
Joh Henry Halley was born on July 9, 1828, in Bedford County, Virginia. He graduated from Emory and Henry College in 1854 and was admitted to the Virginia Bar Association in 1855. He married Lucy Thompson and the couple had six children. He briefly lived in Lewis County, Missouri, before settling in Putnam County, where he was elected to the Missouri House of Representatives in 1858. At the start of the American Civil War, he joined the Confederate States Army as a lieutenant colonel. He rose to the rank of colonel by the end of the war. He later moved to Jasper County, Illinois, where he was elected to the Illinois House of Representatives in 1874 and 1876. In 1877, he was elected district judge for Effingham County to 1879. He married Annie Howard Stuart on July 21, 1883, and the couple had two children. After leaving the bench he moved to Oklahoma Territory, where he died in January 1898.
