= McNairy, Tennessee =

Coordinates: 35°18′43″N 88°37′38″W

McNairy is an unincorporated community in McNairy County, in the U.S. state of Tennessee.

== History ==
McNairy had its start when the railroad was extended to that point. A variant name was "McNairy Station". A post office called McNairy Station was established in 1866, the name was change to McNairy in 1882, and the post office closed in 1979.
