= Walter Crowder Dean =

American politician (1865–1952)

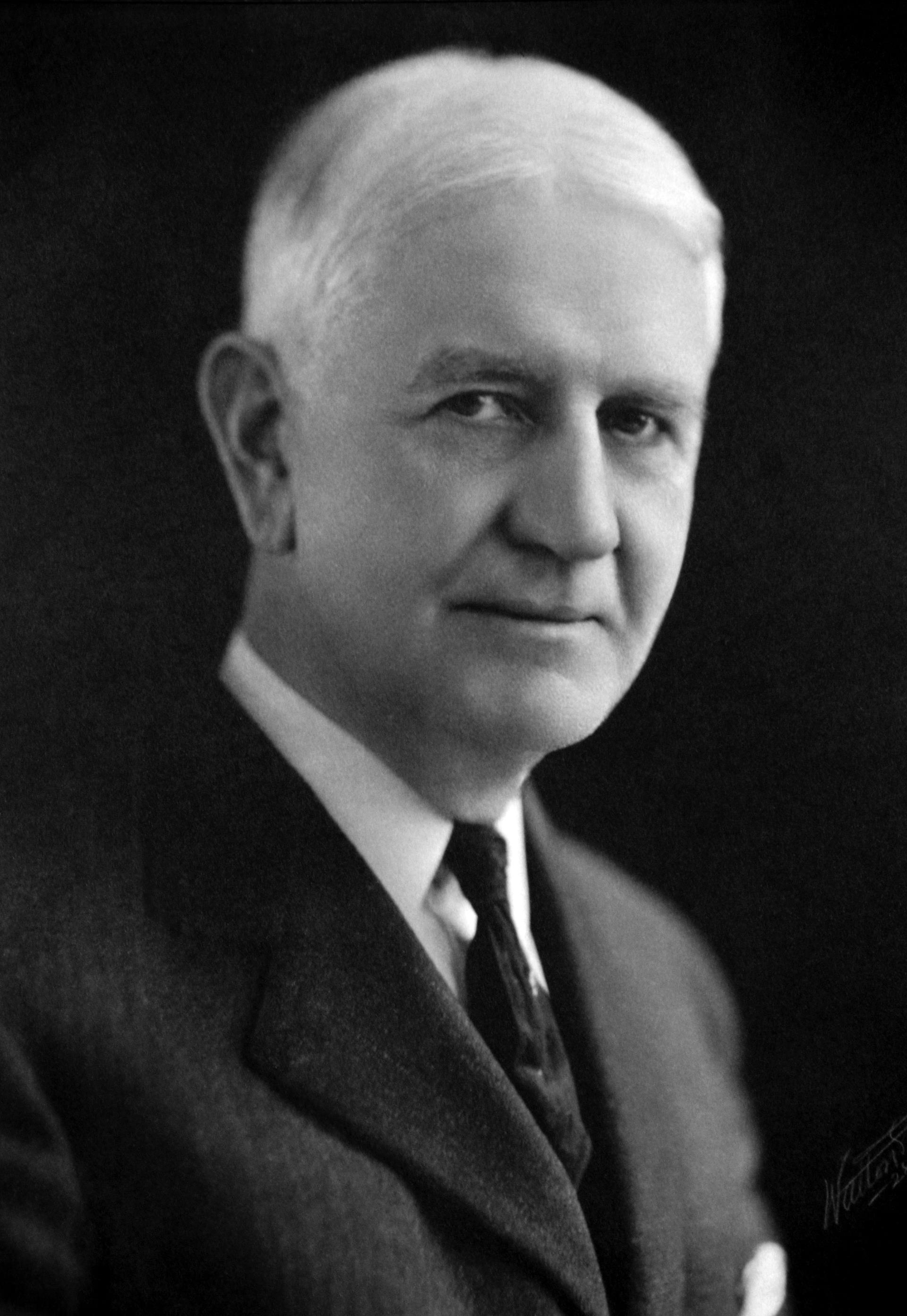

22nd Mayor of Oklahoma City
- In office April 12, 1927 – April 12, 1931
- Preceded by: O. A. Cargill
- Succeeded by: Clarence Blinn

Personal details
- Born: March 16, 1865 Philadelphia, Pennsylvania U.S.
- Died: October 10, 1952 (aged 87)

Walter Crowder Dean (March 16, 1865 – October 10, 1952) was an American politician who served as the Mayor of Oklahoma City between 1927 and 1931.

== Biography ==
Walter Crowder Dean was born on March 16, 1865 in Philadelphia. He worked as a civil engineer in Paris, Texas, before moving to Ardmore, Indian Territory, in 1905. He moved to Oklahoma City in 1908. He found the Dean Jewelry Company. On November 29, 1913, Dean was hired by Governor Lee Cruce to design the silverware set for captain's quarters of the USS Oklahoma. He did not campaign for office, but was elected Mayor of Oklahoma City. He served between April 12, 1927, and April 12, 1931. He died on October 10, 1952.
