= O. A. Cargill =

American politician

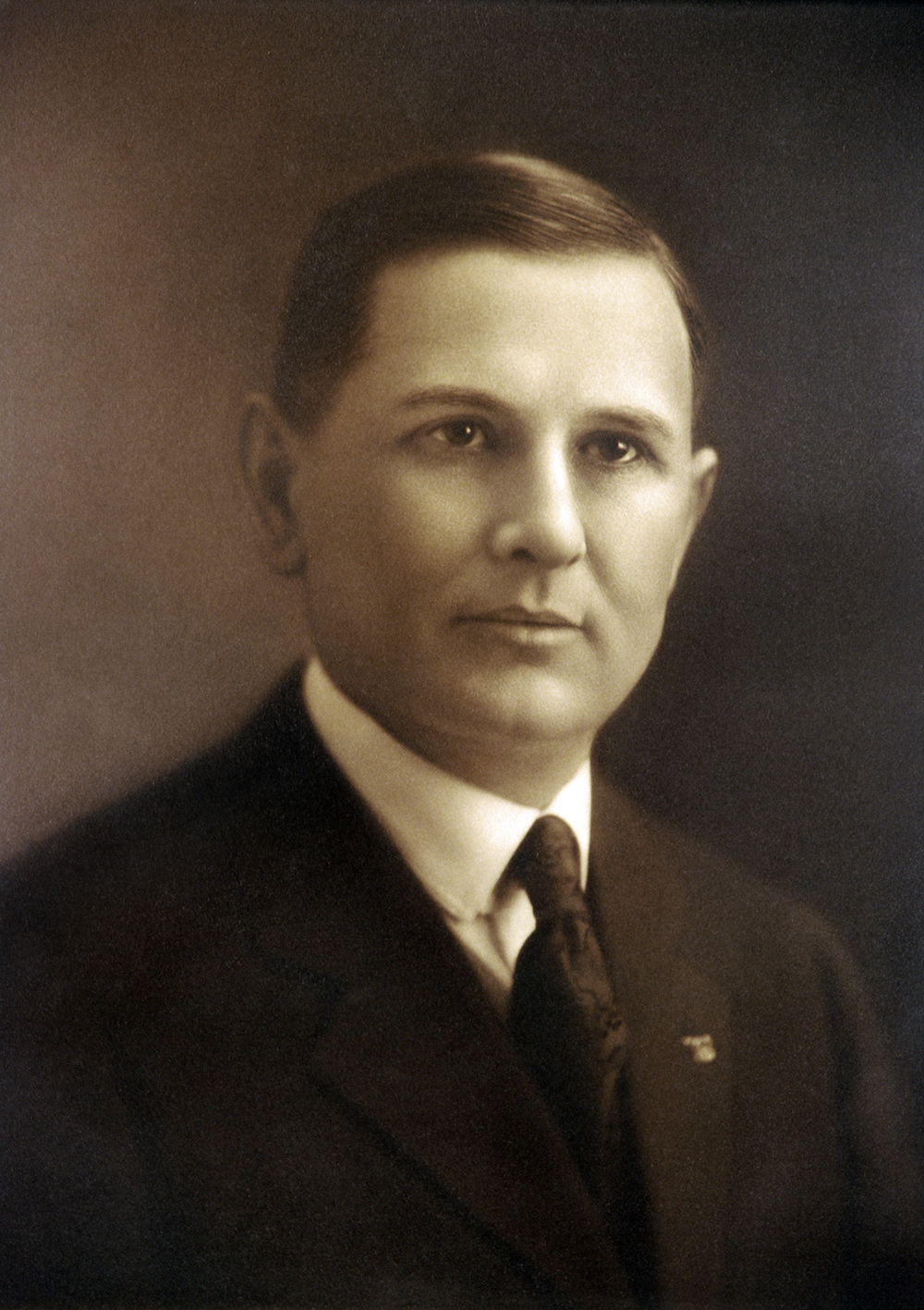

21st Mayor of Oklahoma City
- In office April 4, 1923 – April 12, 1927
- Preceded by: Mike Donnelly (acting)
- Succeeded by: Walter Crowder Dean

Personal details
- Born: February 26, 1885 Viola, Arkansas
- Died: March 20, 1973 (aged 88)

Otto Arthur Cargill (February 26, 1885 – March 20, 1973) was a prominent lawyer, author, politician, and buffalo rancher during Oklahoma's early days. He was mayor of Oklahoma City April 4, 1923 - April 12, 1927.

== Early life ==
Otto "O.A." Cargill was born in Viola, Arkansas, on February 26, 1885, to John Erve Cargill and Anna Mize. His father was a physician and Baptist minister. He was educated at Mountain Home College in Mountain Home, Arkansas. He married Delia Arnold on May 2, 1905, in Cushing, Oklahoma, and they settled in Oklahoma City in 1912. During his early days in Oklahoma and Indian Territory, he was a deputy U.S. marshal under Bill Depew. Cargill worked as a streetcar conductor, became an Oklahoma City police officer, and was admitted to the Oklahoma Bar Association in 1916. He was county attorney of Oklahoma County 1919–1920.

== Political career ==
Cargill was elected mayor in 1923, defeating Allen Street. Assuming office when the city was in a bad financial condition, Cargill found his reform efforts frustrated, particularly by supporters of the former mayorm Jack C. Waltonm who had remained in office after the election. In 1926, the electorate voted to replace Oklahoma City's existing city commission government with a mayor–council form of government. He ran unsuccessfully for governor in 1926 against Henry S. Johnstonm who was supported by the Ku Klux Klan. Cargill, being bitterly opposed to the Klan, came in third.

== Role in the murder of Claude Chandler ==
Cargill's gubernatorial campaign claim that he opposed the Ku Klux Klan starkly contradicted at least one dark chapter in the life of a man who admitted to being a former member of the KKK. Cargill, as district attorney of Oklahoma County, ordered a raid on the property of a suspected moonshine bootlegger, Charles Chandler of Logan County, which took place on the morning of August 29, 1920. "Crush it", he had instructed, though the property was outside his jurisdiction.

What occurred at the scene of the raid is not clear. Evidence is clear, however, that a gunfight developed and Chandler was killed along with two law enforcement officers. One officer was injured as was Chandler's son, Claude Chandler, and the one remaining officer at the scene arrested Claude. Logan County Prosecutor A. I. Dinwiddie determined after a cursory investigation that evidence was sufficient to charge Claude Chandler with homicide and try him in court. Dinwiddie determined to initiate a formal inquest and investigation in conjunction with Logan County officers. However, before Logan County officers could transport him to the Logan County Jail, Cargill arrived on the scene with a group of heavily armed men and took custody of Chandler and crime-scene evidence. Cargill indicated that he was taking Chandler to Oklahoma City to be prosecuted in federal court, which he later admitted was a bluff. Dinwiddie's insistence that Logan County officials had jurisdiction, and that Oklahoma county and federal statute had no legal mechanism by which to prosecute Chandler (claims which were confirmed by Federal District Attorney Herbert Peck), served only to anger Cargill, who would not be deterred.

Cargill voiced concern that "a Logan County jury made up largely of Negroes would have turned [him] loose". Cargill ordered that Chandler be taken to the Oklahoma County Jail. There, jail personnel were substantially and anomalously weakened, although The Daily Oklahoman reported at the time that threats to lynch Claude Chandler "were legion". In recounting his role in the episode, Cargill said, "The officers of Logan County were foolish to be bluffed by Oklahoma county officers. The government did not want Chandler, and he could not be prosecuted in Oklahoma County. I went to the scene of the murder and found [Deputy] Adrean and [Agent] Weiss lying in bloody dirt while Logan County officers stood and talked about holding an inquest. I did not fool; I just took things in my own hands, ordered the bodies taken to Oklahoma City, the Chandler boy to be brought to our jail. I guess those Logan officers are still standing gaping at the road talking inquest."

The following night, three men easily gained access to the jail, which was under the protection of one guard, and a mob abducted and brutally murdered Claude Chandler. In subsequent grand jury hearings, 13 inmates identified Deputy Luther Bishop as the leader of the mob, one a former deputy and another who had known Bishop for over a decade. Cargill previously hired Bishop to work in the district attorney's office. The two were very close, Cargill's life having years before been saved by Bishop. Though Bishop refused to testify to the grand jury, a man named Ned Looney testified that he had seen Bishop at a filling station at the time of the abduction of Claude Chandler. Loony was appointed deputy district attorney by Cargill two days after the lynching. Jail logs indicate that three inmates, the only three who testified to the grand jury that it was not Bishop who had abducted Chandler, were released from jail by Assistant D.A. Looney. A photo was taken of Claude Chandler, dead and hanging from a tree, while a man who appears to be Bishop rests his arm on one of Chandler's feet. The following caption is written on the photo: "I send you this beautiful photograph this is one who died by the unwritten law yesterday. -Ned"

== Later career and perjury conviction ==
Cargill practiced law for many years. Late in his career, he became embroiled in a wide-ranging bribery scandal also involving several justices of the Oklahoma Supreme Court. During the 1965 Oklahoma Supreme Court scandal, he was convicted on three counts of perjury and sentenced five years in prison. In 1967, the United States Court of Appeals for the Tenth Circuit set aside two of the counts, but affirmed his conviction on the third.

== Family ==
He had four children: O.A. "Buck" Cargill Jr., Keet Cargill, Oklahoma Cargill Hood, and Otha Cargill Westcott. He was the grandfather of country music star Henson Cargill, O.A. "Little Buck" Cargill Jr., and Carol Cargill.
