= Oklahoma Attorney General =

Attorney general for the U.S. state of Oklahoma

Attorney General of Oklahoma
- Great Seal of Oklahoma

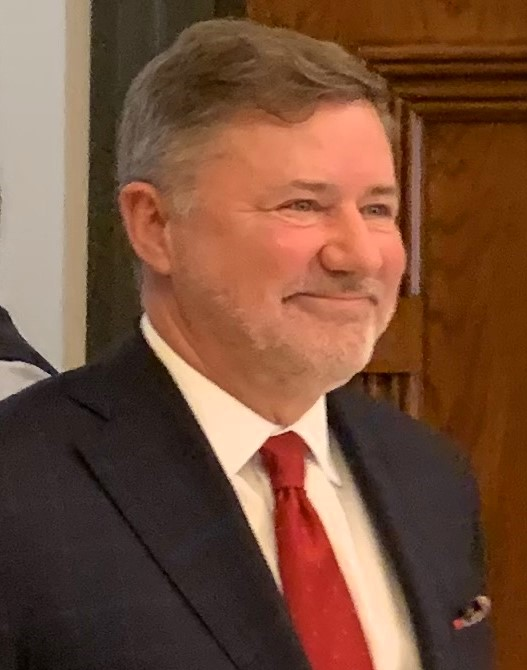
- Incumbent; Gentner Drummond since January 9, 2023
- Office of the Attorney General of Oklahoma
- Precursor: Office of the Territorial Attorney General
- Formation: November 17, 1907
- Succession: Fifth
- Website: www.oag.ok.gov

The attorney general of Oklahoma is the State Attorney General for the state of Oklahoma. The attorney general serves as the chief legal and law enforcement officer of the State of Oklahoma and head of the Office of the Oklahoma Attorney General. The attorney general is responsible for providing legal advice to the other departments and agencies of the executive branch, legislative branch and judicial branch of the state government. The attorney general is also responsible for the prosecution of offenses against Oklahoma law and advocate for the basic legal rights of Oklahoma residents.

The 20th attorney general of Oklahoma is Gentner Drummond. He succeeded the 19th attorney general of Oklahoma, John M. O'Connor. The 18th attorney general of Oklahoma was Mike Hunter, who assumed that post on February 20, 2017, serving until his resignation on June 1, 2021. Governor Mary Fallin appointed him to succeed Scott Pruitt who was nominated on December 7, 2016 by President-elect Donald Trump to be the next administrator of the Environmental Protection Agency. Pruitt was confirmed by the United States Senate as EPA Administrator on February 17, 2017.

== Election ==
The state attorney general is elected directly by the people of Oklahoma. Elections for the office are held on a four-year basis. In the event of a tie between two or more candidates, the Oklahoma Legislature, by joint ballot, chooses one of the candidates.

According to Article V of the Oklahoma Constitution require, persons running for the office must be a citizen of the state, a resident of the United States for ten years, and at least thirty-one years of age.

The state attorney general's term lasts for four years and runs parallel with the term of the Governor of Oklahoma, beginning on the first Monday in January following their election. As originally written, the Oklahoma Constitution placed no limits on the number of terms an individual could serve as attorney general. Following the results of the 2010 state elections, the state constitution was amended to limit the attorney general to no more than two terms, consecutive or not.

== Powers and responsibilities ==
The Attorney General is the chief legal officer of Oklahoma. The Attorney General's duties include the following:

- Providing legal advice and representation in court for the Governor and the state government in general
- Providing legal advice, official opinions, to the Governor and members of the Legislature
- Defending the state in cases of criminal appeals and suits against the state
- Defending the constitutionality of state laws

One primary responsibility of the Attorney General is to appear before the Oklahoma Supreme Court or the Oklahoma Court of Criminal Appeals and prosecute or defend all actions and proceedings, civil or criminal, in which the state is a party. This duty extends to representing the state in any United States federal court as well. The Attorney General may also prosecute or defend the state or the people of the state when their interests are before any state commission, board or office. It is also the duty of the Attorney General to institute civil actions against members of any state board, commission, or office for failure to perform their legal duties as well as to prosecute members of any state board, commission, or office for violation of the criminal laws when such violations have occurred in connection with the performance of their official duties.

Another primary role of the Attorney General is to provide a legal opinion upon all questions of law submitted to the Attorney General. Such questions may be submitted by the Legislature (or either branch thereof) or by any state officer, board, commission or department. However, the Attorney General may only provide a legal opinion on matter related to the official duties of the officers that submitted the question and may not act a private attorney. However, members of the Oklahoma House of Representatives and Oklahoma Senate may ask the Attorney General for a legal opinion upon any subject. Private citizens may not ask for legal opinions of the Attorney General.

A chief concern of the Attorney General is monitoring the proper application of state funds appropriated by the Legislature and to prosecute breaches of trust in the administration of such funds. At the request of the Governor, Oklahoma State Auditor and Inspector, Oklahoma State Treasurer, or either branch of the Legislature, the Attorney General may prosecute for any violation of any contract in which the state is interested. When requested to do so by any state officer, board or commission, the office must also prepare proper drafts for contracts, forms and other writing which may be wanted for the use of the state. If funds are illegally expended, upon the request of the Governor or the Legislature, it is the Attorney General who is responsible for instituting actions to recover such funds. This duty also extends to recovering state property and to preventing the illegal use of any state property. After collecting money owed to the state, the Attorney General must deposit all funds into the State Treasury immediately.

The Attorney General has the power to convene multi-county grand juries.

At any time, the Legislature, or either chamber thereof, may require the Attorney General to submit a report on any business relating to the duties of the Attorney General's office.

== Relationship with Governor ==
Though the Governor of Oklahoma and Attorney General are elected at the same time, each is directly elected. Since both are directly chosen by the voters, the relationship between the offices can vary based on the individuals who hold the offices; this can become evident when the Governor and the Attorney General are of different parties, which has become more frequent since Republicans have been making gains in statewide elections. Democratic Attorney General Charles R. Nesbitt and Republican Governor Henry Bellmon in 1963 was the first instance of this occurrence. Since then this has happened two more times: in 1987 with Republican Governor Henry Bellmon and Democratic Attorney General Robert Harlan Henry, in 1995 with Republican Governor Frank Keating and Democratic Attorney General Drew Edmondson.

When a Governor and Attorney General are of the same party, the relationship often becomes more collegial. However, when the Governor and Attorney General are of different parties, the relation can become somewhat adversarial. This was demonstrated when, in 2001, Governor Keating and Attorney General Edmondson were the plaintiff and defendant in the Oklahoma Supreme Court case Keating v. Edmondson.

The Governor, as the chief executive of the State, determines the budget for the entire State Government (including the Attorney General's Office). Additionally, any power or function of the Attorney General must be exercised at the direction of the Governor. Should the Attorney General refuse, the Governor has the power to employ Special Counsel to exercise the Attorney General's power for him. The Oklahoma Secretary of Safety and Security, who is appointed by the Governor and serves at his pleasure, oversees the activities of the Attorney General's Office on behald of the Governor. On the other hand, legal opinions issued by the Attorney General are binding on the Governor until overturned by a court of law.

== Relations with District Attorneys ==
Though the Attorney General is the chief law enforcement officer of the State, the State's several District Attorneys (which are the primary local prosecutors of the State) are directly elected and not under the control of the Attorney General. The State is divided into 27 judicial districts, each with one District Attorney. The main purpose of the District Attorney is the prosecution of all criminal actions that occur in their district as well as representing the State in all civil actions arising out of their district. The Attorney General does not have the power to direct, stop, prevent or otherwise interfere with a District Attorney choosing to prosecute an individual or not. The primary relations between the Attorney General and the District Attorneys is that in cases appealed from the Trial Court level, the Attorney General represents the State at the Appeal Court level instead of the District Attorney.

While the Attorney General does not control local District Attorneys, he does have the power to require the aid and assistance of any District Attorney (in their respective District) on matters related to the Attorney General functions or case brought to the Supreme Court of Oklahoma or the Oklahoma Court of Criminal Appeals from their respective District. Likewise, any District Attorney may request the assistance of the Attorney General in any matter related to the District Attorney's functions. Such request must be submitted to the Governor of Oklahoma, and; should they approve, the Governor will direct the Attorney General to assist the requesting District Attorney. There is no appeal of the Governor's decision on this matter.

== Oath ==
"I, ........., do solemnly swear (or affirm) that I will support, obey, and defend the Constitution of the United States, and the Constitution of the State of Oklahoma, and that I will not, knowingly, receive, directly or indirectly, any money or other valuable thing, for the performance or nonperformance of any act or duty pertaining to my office, other than the compensation allowed by law; I further swear (or affirm) that I will faithfully discharge my duties as Attorney General of the State of Oklahoma to the best of my ability."

== Office-holders ==
Denotes an acting attorney general

Parties

Democratic (15) Republican (5)

| No. | Image | Name | Party | Term |
|---|---|---|---|---|
| 1 | | Charles West | Democratic | 1907–1915 |
| 2 | | Sargent Prentiss Freeling | Democratic | 1915–1923 |
| 3 | | George Short | Democratic | 1923–1927 |
| 4 | | Ed Dabney | Democratic | 1927–1931 |
| 5 | | J. Berry King | Democratic | 1931–1935 |
| 6 | | Mac Q. Williamson | Democratic | 1935–1943 |
| 7 | | Randell S. Cobb | Democratic | 1943–1946 |
| 8 | | Mac Q. Williamson | Democratic | 1946–1963 |
| 9 | | Charles R. Nesbitt | Democratic | 1963–1967 |
| 10 | | G. T. Blankenship | Republican | 1967–1971 |
| 11 | | Larry Derryberry | Democratic | 1971–1979 |
| 12 | | Jan Eric Cartwright | Democratic | 1979–1983 |
| 13 | | Mike Turpen | Democratic | 1983–1987 |
| 14 | | Robert Harlan Henry | Democratic | January 12, 1987 – June 22, 1991 |
| 15 | | Susan B. Loving | Democratic | June 22, 1991 – January 9, 1995 |
| 16 | | Drew Edmondson | Democratic | January 9, 1995 – January 10, 2011 |
| 17 | | Scott Pruitt | Republican | January 10, 2011 – February 17, 2017 |
| - | | Cara Rodriguez (Acting) | Republican | February 17, 2017 – February 20, 2017 |
| 18 | | Michael J. Hunter | Republican | February 20, 2017 – June 1, 2021 |
| - | | Dawn Cash (Acting) | Republican | June 8, 2021 – July 23, 2021 |
| 19 | | John M. O'Connor | Republican | July 23, 2021 – January 9, 2023 |
| 20 | | Gentner Drummond | Republican | January 9, 2023 – present |
