= G. T. Blankenship =

American politician (1928–2024)

10th Attorney General of Oklahoma
- In office 1967–1971
- Governor: Dewey F. Bartlett
- Preceded by: Charles R. Nesbitt
- Succeeded by: Larry Derryberry

Minority leader of the Oklahoma House of Representatives
- In office 1964–1966
- Preceded by: C. W. Doornbos
- Succeeded by: James W. Connor

Member of the Oklahoma House of Representatives from the 83rd district
- In office 1961–1966
- Succeeded by: Ralph Gordon Thompson

Personal details
- Born: George Tony Blankenship Jr. March 11, 1928 Oklahoma City, Oklahoma, U.S.
- Died: April 20, 2024 (aged 96)
- Party: Republican
- Spouse: Libby
- Children: 3

George Tony Blankenship Jr. (March 11, 1928 – April 20, 2024) was an American lawyer and politician who served as the Attorney General of Oklahoma from 1967 to 1971 and in the Oklahoma House of Representatives from 1961 to 1966. He also served as the minority leader of the Oklahoma House of Representatives between 1964 and 1966 and was the first Republican Attorney General of Oklahoma.

A member and minority leader of the Oklahoma House of Representatives, he initiated the investigation of corruption on the Oklahoma Supreme Court that resulted in the removal of three justices during the 1965 Oklahoma Supreme Court scandal and changing the process by which future justices would be selected. Leaving the House to run for higher office, Blankenship served as the 10th attorney general of Oklahoma. After serving as attorney general, he entered private law practice in Oklahoma City and served two terms on the University of Oklahoma's board of regents.

== Early life ==
George Tony Blankenship was born in Oklahoma City on March 11, 1928, to George Tony Blankenship and Daisy Dean Blankenship. He attended Jefferson Elementary, Taft Junior High, and Classen High School. He went on to the University of Oklahoma and received a Bachelor of Arts. He was then admitted to the OU College of Law where he earned a Bachelor of Laws in 1954 and became an attorney.

Blankenship served in the United States Air Force between 1954 and 1956 as a judge advocate for the 23rd Fighter Group. He entered private practice in 1956.

== Political career ==
In 1960, Blankenship was elected to the Oklahoma House of Representatives. He served in the State House until 1967. He was elected by his fellow Republicans to serve as the House Minority Leader from 1964 to 1966, making him the highest-ranking Republican in the House at that time.

One of the most significant events during his career in the House, was a speech he delivered in January 1965 that revealed what would be called the 1965 Oklahoma Supreme Court scandal. The speech resulted in a formal investigation and led to the impeachment and/or removal of three justices, as well as changing the process by which future justices would be selected for the court.

In the 1966 general election, Blankenship became the first Republican in state history to be elected Attorney General of Oklahoma. He succeeded Charles R. Nesbitt. Blankenship served one term as attorney general from 1967 to 1971.

After leaving office, Blankenship opened his private practice of law in Oklahoma City. He would later become chairman of the board of directors for the Bank of Nichols Hills in Nichols Hills, Oklahoma. While engaged in private practice, Blankenship would become actively involved with the Oklahoma City Chamber of Commerce.

== University of Oklahoma ==
Blankenship was appointed to the board of regents of the University of Oklahoma in 1990 by Republican Governor of Oklahoma Henry Bellmon. He served two terms as chairman of the board of regents in 1995 and 1996. Governor Frank Keating reappointed him to the board in 1997. He was elected chairman again in 2003. His second term ended in 2004, after which he retired.

The Sarkeys Foundation has established the G.T. Blankenship Chair for Alzheimer's and Aging Research at the Oklahoma Medical Research Foundation. Blankenship and his wife established the G.T. and Libby Blankenship Chair in the History of Liberty, the purpose of which is to emphasize the importance of undergraduate teaching and focus on historical and contemporary issues of freedom.

== Personal life and death ==
Blankenship and his wife, Libby, lived in Oklahoma City and had three children. He was inducted into the Oklahoma Hall of Fame in 2001. He died on April 20, 2024, at the age of 96.

Political offices
Preceded by	Oklahoma State Representative; 1961–1967	Succeeded by
Preceded by	Minority Leader of the Oklahoma House of Representatives; 1965–1967	Succeeded by
Preceded by Charles R. Nesbitt	Attorney General of Oklahoma; 1967–1971	Succeeded by Larry Derryberry
Party political offices
Preceded by David C. Shapard	Republican nominee for Attorney General of Oklahoma; 1966, 1970	Succeeded by Stephen Jones
