= Samuel Earl Welch =

American judge

- Born: January 27, 1892; Choctaw Nation, Indian Territory (now LeFlore County, Oklahoma)
- Died: November 12, 1969 (aged 77); Oklahoma City
- Other name: Earl Welch
- Occupations: Attorney, Judge
- Years active: 1911-1965
- Known for: First enrolled member of any tribe to sit on the Oklahoma Supreme Court.

Samuel Earl Welch (January 27, 1892 – November 12, 1969), more commonly written as Earl Welch was a native of Indian Territory, born in 1892, near the present town of Wister, Oklahoma in the present LeFlore County, Oklahoma. He was the second-oldest of nine children born to Charles Arthur Welch (1871-1927) and Mary Adelia Morton (1870-1930). His early education was in schools at Poteau, Talihina, and Antlers. He attended Hargrove College in Ardmore, in 1905-07, then the University of Arkansas in 1908-9 He attended the newly-founded University of Oklahoma School of Law in 1909-11, but dropped out before graduation because of inadequate finances. He completed his legal education by reading the law in the office of his father and grandfather, and was admitted to the bar in 1911.

Welch belonged to a private law practice, Welch & Welch, from 1911 to 1926, and also served as mayor of Antlers during 1920-26, before serving as District Judge from 1927 to 1932. In 1932, he became an associate justice of the Oklahoma Supreme Court. An OU alumni magazine noted that Welch was of Chickasaw descent, and that he was the first enrolled member of any tribe to sit on the Oklahoma Supreme Court.

== Trial of Justices Welch and Corn ==
On April 8, 1964, the New York Times reported that a Federal grand jury had indicted Justice Earl Welch and former Justice N. S. Corn, who had been charged with income tax evasion. The indictment said that Welch had evaded $13,364 in income taxes for 1957 through 1961, and Corn evaded $11,063 in 1957 through 1959. At the time of the trial, Welch was still an active Justice on the Oklahoma Supreme. Corn, then 80 years old, had taken semi-retirement status in 1959, drawing three-fourths of his normal salary and working only on special assignments. Corn pleaded nolo contendere at the trial, and was sentenced to 18 months in prison and a fine of $11,250.

In October 1964, Welch was convicted of five counts of tax evasion. He was sentenced to three years in prison the following month.

== Personal life ==
Welch was married to Fern Kerr (1894-1986).
