= 1914 Oklahoma elections =

- November, 1914

The 1914 Oklahoma elections were held on November 3, 1914, in the U.S. state of Oklahoma. Oklahoma voters elected statewide officials and members of the United States House of Representatives.

== Federal ==
=== House ===
| District | Incumbent | | | This race | |
| District | Member | Party | First elected | Results | Candidates |
|---|---|---|---|---|---|
| Oklahoma 1 | Bird S. McGuire | Republican | 1907 | Incumbent retired. Republican loss. | ▌ ✓ James S. Davenport (Democratic) 46.4%; ▌Joseph A. Gill (Republican) 42.7%; ▌G. A. Lafayette (Socialist) 9.9%; ▌Lloyd G. Owen (Progressive) 1.1% |
| Oklahoma 1 | James S. Davenport; Redistricted from the 3rd district | Democratic | 1910 | Incumbent re-elected. | ▌ ✓ James S. Davenport (Democratic) 46.4%; ▌Joseph A. Gill (Republican) 42.7%; ▌G. A. Lafayette (Socialist) 9.9%; ▌Lloyd G. Owen (Progressive) 1.1% |
| Oklahoma 2 | None (New district) | | | New district. Democratic gain. | ▌ ✓ William W. Hastings (Democratic) 49.1%; ▌Charles A. Cooke (Republican) 33.1%; ▌Clifford S. Crain (Socialist) 17.1%; ▌P. E. Reed (Progressive) 0.6%; ▌Taylor H. Ebersole (Prohibition) 0.2% |
| Oklahoma 3 | Charles D. Carter; Redistricted from the 4th district | Democratic | 1907 | Incumbent re-elected. | ▌ ✓ Charles D. Carter (Democratic) 50.0%; ▌R. L. Norman (Socialist) 30.7%; ▌C. H. Elting (Republican) 18.8%; ▌Dudley B. Buell (Progressive) 0.6% |
| Oklahoma 4 | William H. Murray; Redistricted from the at-large seat | Democratic | 1912 | Incumbent re-elected. | ▌ ✓ William H. Murray (Democratic) 42.2%; ▌James D. Flynn (Republican) 28.9%; ▌Marion Hughes (Socialist) 28.2%; ▌E. N. Wright (Progressive) 0.8% |
| Oklahoma 5 | Joseph B. Thompson; Redistricted from the at-large seat | Democratic | 1912 | Incumbent re-elected. | ▌ ✓ Joseph B. Thompson (Democratic) 47.5%; ▌D. K. Pope (Republican) 31.4%; ▌W. L. Lurry (Socialist) 18.3%; ▌Albert Rennie (Progressive) 2.3%; ▌J. E. Brewer (Prohibition) 0.5% |
| Oklahoma 5 | Claude Weaver; Redistricted from the at-large seat | Democratic | 1912 | Incumbent lost renomination. Democratic loss. | ▌ ✓ Joseph B. Thompson (Democratic) 47.5%; ▌D. K. Pope (Republican) 31.4%; ▌W. L. Lurry (Socialist) 18.3%; ▌Albert Rennie (Progressive) 2.3%; ▌J. E. Brewer (Prohibition) 0.5% |
| Oklahoma 6 | Scott Ferris; Redistricted from the 5th district | Democratic | 1907 | Incumbent re-elected. | ▌ ✓ Scott Ferris (Democratic) 48.1%; ▌Alvin Campbell (Republican) 27.4%; ▌J. T. Cumbie (Socialist) 22.0%; ▌E. L. Persons (Progressive) 2.1%; ▌Thomas H. Allen (Prohibition) 0.4% |
| Oklahoma 7 | None (New district) | | | New district. Democratic gain. | ▌ ✓ James V. McClintic (Democratic) 43.1%; ▌H. H. Stallard (Socialist) 33.2%; ▌Walter S. Mills (Republican) 22.5%; ▌Henry S. Vogle (Progressive) 1.2% |
| Oklahoma 8 | Dick T. Morgan; Redistricted from the 2nd district | Republican | 1908 | Incumbent re-elected. | ▌ ✓ Dick T. Morgan (Republican) 41.8%; ▌Henry S. Johnston (Democratic) 39.1%; ▌G. M. Green (Socialist) 13.3%; ▌Charles R. Alexander (Progressive) 5.2%; ▌Charles Brown (Prohibition) 0.7% |

=== Senate ===
1914 United States Senate election in Oklahoma
| Party | Candidate | Votes | % |
|---|---|---|---|
| Democratic | Thomas Gore (inc.) | 119,442 | 47.98% |
| Republican | John H. Burford | 73,292 | 29.44% |
| Socialist | Patrick S. Nagle | 52,229 | 20.98% |
| Progressive | William O. Cromwell | 3,966 | 1.59% |
| Majority | | 46,150 | 18.54% |
| Total votes | | 248,929 | 100.00% |
| Democratic hold | | | |

== State ==
=== Governor ===
1914 gubernatorial election, Oklahoma
| Party | Candidate | Votes | % | ±% |
|---|---|---|---|---|
| Democratic | Robert L. Williams | 100,597 | 39.6% | −8.9% |
| Republican | John Fields | 95,904 | 37.8% | −2.3% |
| Socialist | Fred W. Holt | 52,703 | 20.7% | +10.8% |
| Progressive | John P. Hickam | 4,189 | 1.6% | New |
| Independent | Amos L. Wilson | 206 | 1.6% | N/A |
| Independent | T. J. Wood | 88 | 0.0% | N/A |
| Democratic hold | | Swing | -8.9% | |

=== Lieutenant Governor ===
1914 Oklahoma lieutenant gubernatorial election
- November 3, 1914
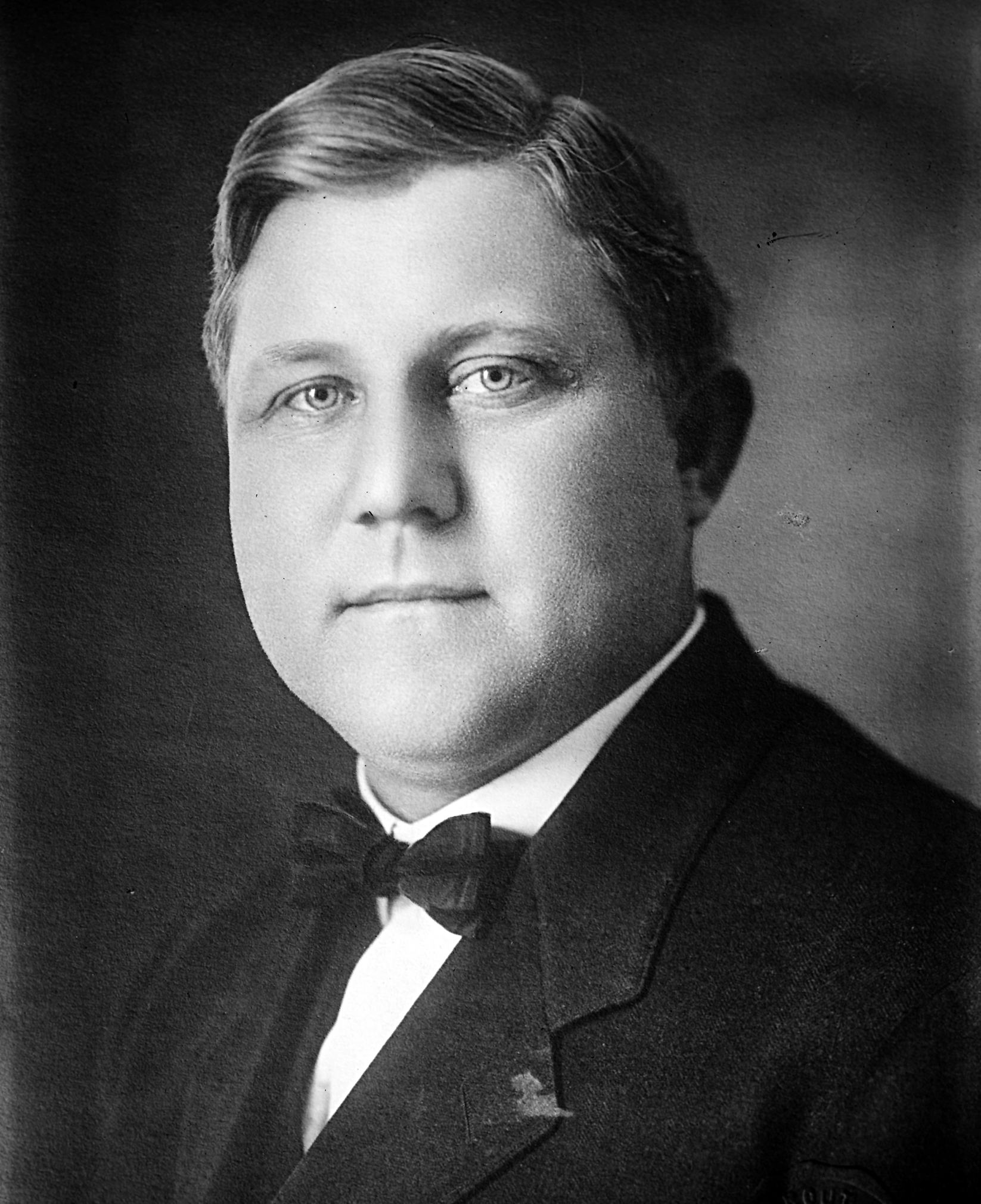
| Nominee | Martin E. Trapp | Eugene B. Lawson | George G. Hamilton |
| Party | Democratic | Republican | Socialist |
| Popular vote | 104,285 | 80,419 | 53,072 |
| Percentage | 42.9% | 33.1% | 21.8% |
- County results Trapp: 30–40% 40–50% 50–60% Lawson: 30–40% 40–50% 50–60% Hamilton: 30–40% 40–50%
Lieutenant Governor before election
J. J. McAlester
Democratic
Elected Lieutenant Governor
Martin E. Trapp
Republican

Democratic Primary

Oklahoma lieutenant gubernatorial Democratic primary (August 4, 1914)
| Party | Candidate | Votes | % |
|---|---|---|---|
| Democratic | Martin E. Trapp | 18,178 | 16.0% |
| Democratic | Ben F. Lafayette | 17,192 | 15.1% |
| Democratic | Pete P. Duffy | 16,307 | 14.3% |
| Democratic | Frank F. Davis | 14,498 | 12.7% |
| Democratic | Woodson Norvell | 11,351 | 9.9% |
| Democratic | Edwin Sorrells | 10,646 | 9.3% |
| Democratic | Richard Billups | 10,233 | 9.0% |
| Democratic | John W. Barbour | 8,704 | 7.6% |
| Democratic | Bert Van Leuven | 3,312 | 2.9% |
| Democratic | Robert H. Oury | 3,123 | 2.7% |
| Turnout | | 113,544 | |

Republican primary

Oklahoma lieutenant gubernatorial Republican primary (August 4, 1914)
| Party | Candidate | Votes | % |
|---|---|---|---|
| Republican | Eugene B. Lawson | 21,191 | 100% |

Socialist primary

Oklahoma lieutenant gubernatorial Socialist primary (August 4, 1914)
| Party | Candidate | Votes | % |
|---|---|---|---|
| Socialist | George G. Hamilton | 15,821 | 100% |

Progressive primary

Oklahoma lieutenant gubernatorial Progressive primary (August 4, 1914)
| Party | Candidate | Votes | % |
|---|---|---|---|
| Progressive | J. M. Marrow | 1,309 | 59.6% |
| Progressive | J. R. Lankard | 885 | 40.3% |
| Turnout | | 2,194 | |

Prohibition primary

Oklahoma lieutenant gubernatorial Prohibition primary (August 4, 1914)
| Party | Candidate | Votes | % |
|---|---|---|---|
| Prohibition | A. H. Crawford | 49 | 100% |

General election

1914 Oklahoma lieutenant gubernatorial election
| Party | Candidate | Votes | % | ±% |
|---|---|---|---|---|
| Democratic | Martin E. Trapp | 104,285 | 42.9% | −6.4% |
| Republican | Eugene B. Lawson | 80,419 | 33.1% | −6.2% |
| Socialist | George G. Hamilton | 53,072 | 21.8% | +11.9% |
| Progressive | J. M. Morrow | 4,459 | 1.8% | New |
| Prohibition | A. H. Crawford | 668 | 0.2% | −1.1% |
| Democratic hold | | Swing | | |

=== Secretary of State ===
1914 Oklahoma Secretary of State election
- November 3, 1914
| Nominee | Joseph Lucien Lyon | Marvin B. Prentiss | H. M. Sinclair |
| Party | Democratic | Republican | Socialist |
| Popular vote | 107,456 | 75,259 | 52,963 |
| Percentage | 44.7% | 31.3% | 22.0% |
- County results Lyon: 30–40% 40–50% 50–60% Prentiss: 30–40% 40–50% 50–60% Sinclair: 30–40% 40–50%
Secretary of State before election
H. G. Oliver
Democratic
Elected Secretary of State
Joseph Lucien Lyon
Democratic

Democratic Primary

Oklahoma secretary of state Democratic primary (August 4, 1914)
| Party | Candidate | Votes | % |
|---|---|---|---|
| Democratic | Joseph Lucien Lyon | 32,770 | 30.8% |
| Democratic | J. S. Askew | 31,362 | 29.5% |
| Democratic | Kirby Frans | 18,116 | 17.0% |
| Democratic | Edward G. Spillman | 14,619 | 13.7% |
| Democratic | J. Y. Battenfield | 9,192 | 8.6% |
| Turnout | | 106,059 | |

Republican primary

Oklahoma Secretary of State Republican primary (August 4, 1914)
| Party | Candidate | Votes | % |
|---|---|---|---|
| Republican | Marvin B. Prentiss | 26,947 | 100% |

Socialist primary

Oklahoma Secretary of State Socialist primary (August 4, 1914)
| Party | Candidate | Votes | % |
|---|---|---|---|
| Socialist | H. M. Sinclair | 15,820 | 100% |

Progressive primary

Oklahoma Secretary of State Progressive primary (August 4, 1914)
| Party | Candidate | Votes | % |
|---|---|---|---|
| Progressive | P. S. Coleman | 1,102 | 50.5% |
| Progressive | Dan W. Patton | 1,080 | 49.4% |
| Turnout | | 2,182 | |

General election

1914 Oklahoma Secretary of State election
| Party | Candidate | Votes | % | ±% |
|---|---|---|---|---|
| Democratic | Joseph Lucien Lyon | 107,456 | 44.7% | −4.6% |
| Republican | Marvin B. Prentiss | 75,259 | 31.3% | −8.1% |
| Socialist | H. M. Sinclair | 52,963 | 22.0% | +12.2% |
| Progressive | Dan W. Patton | 4,527 | 1.8% | New |
| Democratic hold | | Swing | | |

=== State Auditor ===
Democratic Primary

Oklahoma State Auditor Democratic primary (August 4, 1914)
| Party | Candidate | Votes | % |
|---|---|---|---|
| Democratic | Everette B. Howard | 39,601 | 38.7% |
| Democratic | Frank C. Carter | 38,743 | 37.9% |
| Democratic | Frank B. Lucas | 23,846 | 23.3% |
| Turnout | | 102,190 | |

Republican primary

Oklahoma State Auditor Republican primary (August 4, 1914)
| Party | Candidate | Votes | % |
|---|---|---|---|
| Republican | Geo. H. Foster | 27,522 | 100% |

Socialist primary

Oklahoma State Auditor Socialist primary (August 4, 1914)
| Party | Candidate | Votes | % |
|---|---|---|---|
| Socialist | S. H. Colwick | 15,803 | 100% |

Progressive primary

Oklahoma State Auditor Progressive primary (August 4, 1914)
| Party | Candidate | Votes | % |
|---|---|---|---|
| Progressive | B. F. Morris | 1,313 | 60.7% |
| Progressive | L. D. Burton | 848 | 39.2% |
| Turnout | | 2,161 | |

Prohibition primary

Oklahoma State Auditor Prohibition primary (August 4, 1914)
| Party | Candidate | Votes | % |
|---|---|---|---|
| Prohibition | D. A. Holmes | 48 | 100% |
| Turnout | | 48 | |

General election

1914 Oklahoma State Auditor election
| Party | Candidate | Votes | % | ±% |
|---|---|---|---|---|
| Democratic | Everette B. Howard | 107,728 | 44.7% | −5.4% |
| Republican | Geo. H. Foster | 75,404 | 31.3% | −8.5% |
| Socialist | S. H. Colwick | 52,605 | 21.8% | +11.8% |
| Progressive | B. F. Morris | 4,468 | 1.8% | New |
| Prohibition | D. A. Holmes | 677 | 0.2% | New |
| Democratic hold | | Swing | | |

Results by county Howard: 30–40%; 40–50%; Foster: 30–40%; 40–50%; Colwick: 30–40%; 40–50%; Tie: 30–40%

=== Attorney General ===
Democratic Primary

Oklahoma Attorney General Democratic primary (August 4, 1914)
| Party | Candidate | Votes | % |
|---|---|---|---|
| Democratic | Sargent Prentiss Freeling | 26,085 | 23.2% |
| Democratic | Geo. D. Key | 24,190 | 21.5% |
| Democratic | Ed P. Hill | 18,060 | 16.0% |
| Democratic | E. J. Giddings | 16,444 | 14.6% |
| Democratic | Fred S. Caldwell | 15,843 | 14.1% |
| Democratic | Chas. M. Cope | 11,735 | 10.4% |
| Turnout | | 112357 | |

Republican primary

Oklahoma Attorney General Republican primary (August 4, 1914)
| Party | Candidate | Votes | % |
|---|---|---|---|
| Republican | Walter C. Stevens | 27,490 | 100% |

Socialist primary

Oklahoma Attorney General Socialist primary (August 4, 1914)
| Party | Candidate | Votes | % |
|---|---|---|---|
| Socialist | W. T. Banks | 15,823 | 100% |

Progressive primary

Oklahoma Attorney General Progressive primary (August 4, 1914)
| Party | Candidate | Votes | % |
|---|---|---|---|
| Progressive | John A. Haver | 2,060 | 100% |

General election

1914 Oklahoma Attorney General election
| Party | Candidate | Votes | % | ±% |
|---|---|---|---|---|
| Democratic | Sargent Prentiss Freeling | 106,412 | 44.0% | −6.5% |
| Republican | Walter C. Stevens | 77521 | 32.0% | −7.5% |
| Socialist | W. T. Banks | 52989 | 21.9% | +12.0% |
| Progressive | John A. Haver | 4617 | 1.9% | New |
| Democratic hold | | Swing | | |

Results by county Freeling: 30–40%; 40–50%; 50–60%; 60–70%; Stevens: 30–40%; 40–50%; 50–60%; Banks: 30–40%; 40–50%

=== State Treasurer ===
Results by county Alexander: 30–40%; 40–50%; 50–60%; Mathis: 30–40%; 40–50%; 50–60%; Stofer: 30–40%; 40–50%

Democratic Primary

Oklahoma State Treasurer Democratic primary (August 4, 1914)
| Party | Candidate | Votes | % |
|---|---|---|---|
| Democratic | William Lee Alexander | 43,288 | 40.6% |
| Democratic | Joseph C. McClelland | 38,926 | 36.5% |
| Democratic | Abner Bruce | 24,375 | 22.8% |
| Turnout | | 106,589 | |

Republican primary

Oklahoma State Treasurer Republican primary (August 4, 1914)
| Party | Candidate | Votes | % |
|---|---|---|---|
| Republican | L. Mathis | 27,033 | 100% |

Socialist primary

Oklahoma State Treasurer Socialist primary (August 4, 1914)
| Party | Candidate | Votes | % |
|---|---|---|---|
| Socialist | Oles Stofer | 15,758 | 100% |

Progressive primary

Oklahoma State Treasurer Progressive primary (August 4, 1914)
| Party | Candidate | Votes | % |
|---|---|---|---|
| Progressive | F. N. Winslow | 1,942 | 100% |

General election

1914 Oklahoma State Treasurer election
| Party | Candidate | Votes | % | ±% |
|---|---|---|---|---|
| Democratic | William Lee Alexander | 107,700 | 44.7% | −4.9 |
| Republican | L. Mathis | 75,451 | 31.3% | −7.9% |
| Socialist | Oles Stofer | 52,677 | 21.9% | +12% |
| Progressive | F. N. Winslow | 4,695 | 1.9% | New |
| Democratic hold | | Swing | | |

=== State Superintendent ===
Democratic Primary

Oklahoma State Superintendent Democratic primary (August 4, 1914)
| Party | Candidate | Votes | % |
|---|---|---|---|
| Democratic | R. H. Wilson (incumbent) | 64,807 | 63.6% |
| Democratic | Clinton M. Allen | 37,084 | 36.3% |
| Turnout | | 101891 | |

Republican primary

Oklahoma State Superintendent Republican primary (August 4, 1914)
| Party | Candidate | Votes | % |
|---|---|---|---|
| Republican | C. G. Vannest | 26,581 | 100% |

Socialist primary

Oklahoma State Superintendent Socialist primary (August 4, 1914)
| Party | Candidate | Votes | % |
|---|---|---|---|
| Socialist | J. O. Weldy | 15,700 | 100% |

Progressive primary

Oklahoma State Superintendent Progressive primary (August 4, 1914)
| Party | Candidate | Votes | % |
|---|---|---|---|
| Progressive | Cyris H. Parrick | 2,103 | 100% |

General election

1914 Oklahoma State Superintendent election
| Party | Candidate | Votes | % | ±% |
|---|---|---|---|---|
| Democratic | R. H. Wilson (incumbent) | 107,686 | 44.7% | −5.6% |
| Republican | C. G. Vannest | 75705 | 31.4% | −8.2% |
| Socialist | J. O. Welday | 52658 | 21.8% | +11.8% |
| Progressive | Cyris H. Parrick | 4,584 | 1.9% | New |
| Democratic hold | | Swing | | |

=== State Examiner and Inspector ===
Democratic Primary

Oklahoma State Examiner and Inspector Democratic primary (August 4, 1914)
| Party | Candidate | Votes | % |
|---|---|---|---|
| Democratic | Fred Parkinson (incumbent) | 51,474 | 55.3% |
| Democratic | Hugh Gerner | 40,436 | 43.4% |
| Democratic | E. J. Mitchell | 1,064 | 1.1% |
| Turnout | | 92974 | |

Republican primary

Oklahoma State Examiner and Inspector Republican primary (August 4, 1914)
| Party | Candidate | Votes | % |
|---|---|---|---|
| Republican | John S. Woofter | 26,683 | 100% |

Socialist primary

Oklahoma State Examiner and Inspector Socialist primary (August 4, 1914)
| Party | Candidate | Votes | % |
|---|---|---|---|
| Socialist | John Hagel | 15,643 | 100% |

Progressive primary

Oklahoma State Examiner and Inspector Progressive primary (August 4, 1914)
| Party | Candidate | Votes | % |
|---|---|---|---|
| Progressive | Harry H. Keener | 2,069 | 100% |

General election

1914 Oklahoma State Examiner and Inspector election
| Party | Candidate | Votes | % | ±% |
|---|---|---|---|---|
| Democratic | Fred Parkinson (incumbent) | 107,002 | 44.8% | −6.2% |
| Republican | John S. Woofter | 74,215 | 31.1% | −8.6% |
| Socialist | John Hagel | 52,758 | 22.1% | +10.0% |
| Progressive | Harry H. Keener | 4,467 | 1.8% | New |
| Democratic hold | | Swing | | |

=== Chief Mine Inspector ===
Democratic Primary

Oklahoma Chief Mine Inspector primary (August 4, 1914)
| Party | Candidate | Votes | % |
|---|---|---|---|
| Democratic | Ed Boyle (incumbent) | 37,905 | 36.7% |
| Democratic | Pete Hanraty | 26,366 | 25.5% |
| Democratic | Martin Clark | 25,220 | 24.4% |
| Democratic | J. H. Needham | 13,556 | 13.1% |
| Turnout | | 103,047 | |

Republican primary

Oklahoma Chief Mine Inspector Republican primary (August 4, 1914)
| Party | Candidate | Votes | % |
|---|---|---|---|
| Republican | Pat W. Mallory | 26,587 | 100% |

Socialist primary

Oklahoma Chief Mine Inspector Socialist primary (August 4, 1914)
| Party | Candidate | Votes | % |
|---|---|---|---|
| Socialist | Patrick O'Shea | 15,761 | 100% |

General election

1914 Oklahoma Chief Mine Inspector election
| Party | Candidate | Votes | % | ±% |
|---|---|---|---|---|
| Democratic | Ed Boyle (incumbent) | 107,605 | 45.5% | −4.3% |
| Republican | Pat W. Malloy | 75,266 | 31.8% | −8.1% |
| Socialist | Patrick O'Shea | 53,266 | 22.5% | +10.3% |
| Democratic hold | | Swing | | |

=== Commissioner of Labor ===
Democratic Primary

Oklahoma Commissioner of Labor Democratic primary (August 4, 1914)
| Party | Candidate | Votes | % |
|---|---|---|---|
| Democratic | W. G. Ashton | 60,975 | 66.6% |
| Democratic | Pete Garaghty | 30,486 | 33.3% |
| Turnout | | 91461 | |

Republican primary

Oklahoma Commissioner of Labor Republican primary (August 4, 1914)
| Party | Candidate | Votes | % |
|---|---|---|---|
| Republican | Will M. Phares | 26,380 | 100% |

Socialist primary

Oklahoma Commissioner of Labor Socialist primary (August 4, 1914)
| Party | Candidate | Votes | % |
|---|---|---|---|
| Socialist | J. Luther Langston | 15,790 | 100% |

General election

1914 Oklahoma Commissioner of Labor election
| Party | Candidate | Votes | % | ±% |
|---|---|---|---|---|
| Democratic | W. G. Ashton | 106,802 | 45.5% | −4.9% |
| Republican | Will M. Phares | 74314 | 31.6% | −7.8% |
| Socialist | U. G. Tuttle | 53316 | 22.7% | +12.7% |
| Democratic hold | | Swing | | |

=== Commissioner of Charities and Corrections ===
Democratic Primary

Oklahoma Commissioner of Charities and Corrections Democratic primary (August 4, 1914)
| Party | Candidate | Votes | % |
|---|---|---|---|
| Democratic | William D. Matthews | 21,720 | 20.1% |
| Democratic | Mabel Bassett | 19,083 | 17.7% |
| Democratic | Ruth Dickinson Clement | 13,666 | 12.6% |
| Democratic | Frank Naylor | 13,563 | 12.5% |
| Democratic | Anna Laskey | 11,906 | 11.0% |
| Democratic | Dorothy Briley | 8,654 | 8.0% |
| Democratic | Ella Bilbo | 7,488 | 6.9% |
| Democratic | Czarina Conlan | 7,426 | 6.8% |
| Democratic | Roxanna R. Oxford | 4,296 | 3.9% |
| Turnout | | 107812 | |

Republican primary

Oklahoma Commissioner of Charities and Corrections Republican primary (August 4, 1914)
| Party | Candidate | Votes | % |
|---|---|---|---|
| Republican | Alice M. Curtice | 26,854 | 100% |

Socialist primary

Oklahoma Commissioner of Charities and Corrections Socialist primary (August 4, 1914)
| Party | Candidate | Votes | % |
|---|---|---|---|
| Socialist | Florence Anderson | 15,770 | 100% |

Progressive primary

Oklahoma Commissioner of Charities and Corrections Progressive primary (August 4, 1914)
| Party | Candidate | Votes | % |
|---|---|---|---|
| Progressive | Laura M. McLain | 1,404 | 63.4% |
| Progressive | F. W. Smith | 809 | 36.5% |
| Turnout | | 2213 | |

Prohibition primary

Oklahoma Commissioner of Charities and Corrections Prohibition primary (August 4, 1914)
| Party | Candidate | Votes | % |
|---|---|---|---|
| Prohibition | Hettie H. Leonard | 48 | 100% |

General election

1914 Oklahoma Commissioner of Charities and Corrections election
| Party | Candidate | Votes | % | ±% |
|---|---|---|---|---|
| Democratic | William D. Matthews | 105,663 | 44.0% | −7.0% |
| Republican | Alice A. Curtice | 76,167 | 31.7% | −7.1% |
| Socialist | Florence Anderson | 52,984 | 22.0% | +12.0% |
| Progressive | Laura M. McClain | 4,612 | 1.9% | New |
| Prohibition | Hettie H. Leonard | 694 | 0.2% | New |
| Democratic hold | | Swing | | |

=== Commissioner of Insurance ===
Results by county Welch: 30–40%; 40–50%; 50–60%; Hoyt: 30–40%; 40–50%; 50–60%; Woodrow: 30–40%; 40–50%

Democratic Primary

Oklahoma Commissioner of Insurance Democratic primary (August 4, 1914)
| Party | Candidate | Votes | % |
|---|---|---|---|
| Democratic | A. L. Welch (incumbent) | 29,986 | 29.2% |
| Democratic | Arthur W. Pettit | 15,270 | 14.8% |
| Democratic | C. M. Brewer | 14,832 | 14.4% |
| Democratic | James A. Jones | 11,945 | 11.6% |
| Democratic | Eli W. Hardin | 10,283 | 10.0% |
| Democratic | J. J. Barnes | 8,744 | 8.5% |
| Democratic | John L. Spengler | 6,359 | 6.2% |
| Democratic | W. T. S. Barnes | 5,118 | 4.9% |
| Turnout | | 102537 | |

Republican primary

Oklahoma Commissioner of Insurance Republican primary (August 4, 1914)
| Party | Candidate | Votes | % |
|---|---|---|---|
| Republican | Fred B. Hoyt | 26,356 | 100% |

Socialist primary

Oklahoma Commissioner of Insurance Socialist primary (August 4, 1914)
| Party | Candidate | Votes | % |
|---|---|---|---|
| Socialist | Thomas W. Woodrow | 15,776 | 100% |

Progressive primary

Oklahoma Commissioner of Insurance Progressive primary (August 4, 1914)
| Party | Candidate | Votes | % |
|---|---|---|---|
| Progressive | Sam J. Storm | 2,042 | 100% |

General election

1914 Oklahoma Commissioner of Insurance election
| Party | Candidate | Votes | % | ±% |
|---|---|---|---|---|
| Democratic | A. L. Welch (incumbent) | 106,828 | 44.8% | −5.0% |
| Republican | Fred B. Hoyt | 74,287 | 31.1% | −8.9% |
| Socialist | Thomas W. Woodrow | 52,644 | 22.0% | +11.9% |
| Progressive | Sam J. Storm | 4,414 | 1.8% | New |
| Independent | I. P. Mantz | 212 | 0.0% | New |
| Democratic hold | | Swing | | |

=== President of State Board of Agriculture ===
Democratic Primary

Oklahoma President of State Board of Agriculture Democratic primary (August 4, 1914)
| Party | Candidate | Votes | % |
|---|---|---|---|
| Democratic | Frank M. Gault | 38,412 | 37.1% |
| Democratic | J. J. McAlester | 34,590 | 33.4% |
| Democratic | G. H. Adams | 18,405 | 17.7% |
| Democratic | John B. Favor | 9,307 | 8.9% |
| Democratic | Walter H. Mansfield | 2,703 | 2.6% |
| Turnout | | 103417 | |

Republican primary

Oklahoma President of State Board of Agriculture Republican primary (August 4, 1914)
| Party | Candidate | Votes | % |
|---|---|---|---|
| Republican | Harlan Emerson | 26,441 | 100% |

Socialist primary

Oklahoma President of State Board of Agriculture Socialist primary (August 4, 1914)
| Party | Candidate | Votes | % |
|---|---|---|---|
| Socialist | John G. Wills | 15,539 | 100% |

Progressive primary

Oklahoma President of State Board of Agriculture Progressive primary (August 4, 1914)
| Party | Candidate | Votes | % |
|---|---|---|---|
| Progressive | R. M. Bressie | 1,887 | 100% |

General election

1914 Oklahoma President of State Board of Agriculture election
| Party | Candidate | Votes | % | ±% |
|---|---|---|---|---|
| Democratic | Frank M. Gault | 107,501 | 45.1% | −4.9% |
| Republican | Harlan Emerson | 74,339 | 31.2% | −8.6% |
| Socialist | John G. Willis | 51875 | 21.8% | +11.8% |
| Progressive | R. M. Bressie | 4237 | 1.7% | New |
| Democratic hold | | Swing | | |

=== Corporation Commission ===
Democratic Primary

Oklahoma Corporation Commission Democratic primary (August 4, 1914)
| Party | Candidate | Votes | % |
|---|---|---|---|
| Democratic | A. P. Watson (incumbent) | 32,503 | 32.1% |
| Democratic | William T. Field | 19,463 | 19.2% |
| Democratic | Henry J. Denton | 17,244 | 17.0% |
| Democratic | Henry B. Roach | 16,482 | 16.2% |
| Democratic | R. P. Bowles | 15,310 | 15.1% |
| Turnout | | 101002 | |

Republican primary

Oklahoma Corporation Commission Republican primary (August 4, 1914)
| Party | Candidate | Votes | % |
|---|---|---|---|
| Republican | Sherman W. Hill | 26,321 | 100% |

Socialist primary

Oklahoma Corporation Commission Socialist primary (August 4, 1914)
| Party | Candidate | Votes | % |
|---|---|---|---|
| Socialist | Allen Fields | 15,373 | 100% |

Progressive primary

Oklahoma Corporation Commission Progressive primary (August 4, 1914)
| Party | Candidate | Votes | % |
|---|---|---|---|
| Progressive | G. R. McKinley | 1,368 | 67.9% |
| Progressive | Lew Betts | 646 | 32.0% |
| Turnout | | 2014 | |

Prohibition primary

Oklahoma Corporation Commission Prohibition primary (August 4, 1914)
| Party | Candidate | Votes | % |
|---|---|---|---|
| Prohibition | Amos Phifer | 47 | 100% |

General election

1914 Oklahoma Corporation Commission election
| Party | Candidate | Votes | % | ±% |
|---|---|---|---|---|
| Democratic | A. P. Watson (incumbent) | 106,280 | 44.4% | −4.0% |
| Republican | Sherman W. Hill | 74,279 | 31.0% | −12.2% |
| Socialist | Allen Fields | 53060 | 22.1% | +13.7% |
| Progressive | G. R. McKinley | 4991 | 2.0% | New |
| Prohibition | Amos Phifer | 610 | 0.2% | New |
| Democratic hold | | Swing | | |

=== Clerk of the Supreme Court ===
Democratic Primary

Oklahoma Clerk of the Supreme Court Democratic primary (August 4, 1914)
| Party | Candidate | Votes | % |
|---|---|---|---|
| Democratic | William M. Franklin | 25,055 | 30.3% |
| Democratic | Swamp Campbell (incumbent) | 23,625 | 28.6% |
| Democratic | Gus Pool | 21,527 | 26.0% |
| Democratic | Chas. S. Albright | 12,398 | 15.0% |
| Turnout | | 82605 | |

Republican primary

Oklahoma Clerk of the Supreme Court Republican primary (August 4, 1914)
| Party | Candidate | Votes | % |
|---|---|---|---|
| Republican | Zack T. Pryse | 25,543 | 100% |

Socialist primary

Oklahoma Clerk of the Supreme Court Socialist primary (August 4, 1914)
| Party | Candidate | Votes | % |
|---|---|---|---|
| Socialist | R. E. Dooley | 15,438 | 100% |

Progressive primary

Oklahoma Clerk of the Supreme Court Progressive primary (August 4, 1914)
| Party | Candidate | Votes | % |
|---|---|---|---|
| Progressive | J. W. Speaks | 1,820 | 100% |

General election

1914 Oklahoma Clerk of the Supreme Court election
| Party | Candidate | Votes | % | ±% |
|---|---|---|---|---|
| Democratic | William M. Franklin | 107,657 | 45.1% | −4.9% |
| Republican | Zack T. Pryse | 73,451 | 30.8% | −9.0% |
| Socialist | R. E. Dooley | 52840 | 22.1% | +12.1% |
| Progressive | J. W. Speake | 4413 | 1.8% | New |
| Democratic hold | | Swing | | |

=== Oklahoma Supreme Court ===
==== District 2 ====
Democratic primary

Oklahoma Supreme Court primary (August 4, 1914)
| Party | Candidate | Votes | % |
|---|---|---|---|
| Democratic | W. R. Bleakmore | 18,310 | 43.6% |
| Democratic | Summers T. Hardy | 12,037 | 28.7% |
| Democratic | Robert M. Rainey | 11,554 | 27.5% |
| Turnout | | 41901 | |

Republican primary

Oklahoma Supreme Court primary (August 4, 1914)
| Party | Candidate | Votes | % |
|---|---|---|---|
| Republican | L. S. Dolman | 1,372 | 100% |

Socialist primary

Oklahoma Supreme Court primary (August 4, 1914)
| Party | Candidate | Votes | % |
|---|---|---|---|
| Socialist | J. W. Callahan | 4,787 | 100% |

Progressive primary

Oklahoma Supreme Court primary (August 4, 1914)
| Party | Candidate | Votes | % |
|---|---|---|---|
| Progressive | Robert Crockett | 87 | 100% |

General election

Oklahoma Supreme Court general election
| Party | Candidate | Votes | % | ±% |
|---|---|---|---|---|
| Democratic | Summers T. Hardy | 105,784 | 31.3% | −38.5% |
| Democratic | W. R. Bleakmore | 102191 | 30.2% | −38.5% |
| Republican | L. S. Dolman | 72993 | 21.6% | New |
| Socialist | J. W. Callahan | 52314 | 15.5% | New |
| Progressive | Robert Crocket | 4147 | 1.2% | New |
| Democratic hold | | Swing | | |

==== District 4 ====
Democratic primary

Oklahoma Supreme Court primary (August 4, 1914)
| Party | Candidate | Votes | % |
|---|---|---|---|
| Democratic | J. F. Sharp | 10,083 | 34.7% |
| Democratic | Frank M. Bailey | 9,812 | 33.8% |
| Democratic | F. E. Riddle | 9,118 | 31.4% |
| Turnout | | 29013 | |

Republican primary

Oklahoma Supreme Court primary (August 4, 1914)
| Party | Candidate | Votes | % |
|---|---|---|---|
| Republican | A. T. Boys | 4,881 | 100% |

Socialist primary

Oklahoma Supreme Court primary (August 4, 1914)
| Party | Candidate | Votes | % |
|---|---|---|---|
| Socialist | A. C. Barrett | 8,116 | 100% |

General election

Oklahoma Supreme Court general election
| Party | Candidate | Votes | % | ±% |
|---|---|---|---|---|
| Democratic | J. F. Sharp | 105,177 | 45.4% | −2.8% |
| Republican | A. T. Boys | 73186 | 31.6% | −11.8% |
| Socialist | A. C. Barrett | 53219 | 22.9% | +14.5% |
| Democratic hold | | Swing | | |

==== District 5 ====
Democratic primary

Oklahoma Supreme Court primary (August 4, 1914)
| Party | Candidate | Votes | % |
|---|---|---|---|
| Democratic | G. A. Brown | 13,990 | 100% |

Republican primary

Oklahoma Supreme Court primary (August 4, 1914)
| Party | Candidate | Votes | % |
|---|---|---|---|
| Republican | Henry J. Sturgis | 5,480 | 100% |

Progressive primary

Oklahoma Supreme Court primary (August 4, 1914)
| Party | Candidate | Votes | % |
|---|---|---|---|
| Progressive | W. H. Hills | 676 | 100% |

General election

Oklahoma Supreme Court general election
| Party | Candidate | Votes | % | ±% |
|---|---|---|---|---|
| Democratic | G. A. Brown | 104,860 | 57.6% | +1.6% |
| Republican | Henry J. Sturgis | 72440 | 39.8% | −4.1% |
| Progressive | W. H. Hills | 4560 | 2.5% | New |
| Democratic hold | | Swing | | |

=== Court of Criminal Appeals Eastern District ===
Democratic Primary

Oklahoma Court of Criminal Appeals Eastern District Democratic primary (August 4, 1914)
| Party | Candidate | Votes | % |
|---|---|---|---|
| Democratic | James R. Armstrong (incumbent) | 21,026 | 58.3% |
| Democratic | Presley B. Cole | 15,011 | 41.6% |
| Turnout | | 36037 | |

Republican primary

Oklahoma Court of Criminal Appeals Eastern District Republican primary (August 4, 1914)
| Party | Candidate | Votes | % |
|---|---|---|---|
| Republican | John B. Campbell | 5,242 | 70.2% |
| Republican | John H. Clapp | 2,216 | 29.7% |
| Turnout | | 7458 | |

Socialist primary

Oklahoma Court of Criminal Appeals Eastern District Socialist primary (August 4, 1914)
| Party | Candidate | Votes | % |
|---|---|---|---|
| Socialist | W. D. Cope | 4,579 | 100% |

Progressive primary

Oklahoma Court of Criminal Appeals Eastern District Progressive primary (August 4, 1914)
| Party | Candidate | Votes | % |
|---|---|---|---|
| Progressive | Luther Kyle | 159 | 59.7% |
| Progressive | Orlando Swain | 107 | 40.2% |

General election

1914 Oklahoma Court of Criminal Appeals Eastern District election
| Party | Candidate | Votes | % | ±% |
|---|---|---|---|---|
| Democratic | James R. Armstrong | 104,117 | 44.7% | −10.9% |
| Republican | John B. Campbell | 72,779 | 31.2% | =13.1% |
| Socialist | W. D. Cope | 51,977 | 22.3% | New |
| Progressive | Luther Kyle | 3,981 | 1.7% | New |
| Democratic hold | | Swing | | |

=== Assistant Mine Inspector ===
==== District 1 ====
1914 Oklahoma Assistant Mine Inspector District 1 election
| Party | Candidate | Votes | % |
|---|---|---|---|
| Democratic | Thomas Scott | 106,098 | 45.5% |
| Republican | John H. Hall | 74,192 | 31.8% |
| Socialist | Andrew Hentz | 52,715 | 22.6% |
| Democratic hold | | | |

==== District 2 ====
1914 Oklahoma Assistant Mine Inspector District 2 election
| Party | Candidate | Votes | % |
|---|---|---|---|
| Democratic | William T. Williams | 104,613 | 45.3% |
| Republican | M. J. Smith | 73,902 | 32% |
| Socialist | Arthur Oliver | 52,330 | 22.6% |
| Democratic hold | | | |

==== District 3 ====
1914 Oklahoma Assistant Mine Inspector District 3 election
| Party | Candidate | Votes | % |
|---|---|---|---|
| Democratic | Frank Haley (incumbent) | 104,598 | 45.2% |
| Republican | Robert L. King | 74,084 | 32% |
| Socialist | W. M. Crisp | 52,491 | 22.7% |
| Democratic hold | | | |
