= Threadgill =

Threadgill is a surname. Notable people with the surname include:

- Bruce Threadgill (born 1956), American football player
- Frances F. Threadgill (1867–1941), American women's rights activist
- Henry Threadgill (born 1944), American composer, saxophonist, and flautist
- John Threadgill (1847–1915), American politician and physician from Oklahoma
- Kenneth Threadgill (1909–1987), American country singer and tavern owner
- Pyeng Threadgill (born 1977), American blues, jazz and soul blues singer, songwriter and record producer
