= Winnie Branstetter =

American suffragette, writer, and socialist

Winnie Estelle Branstetter
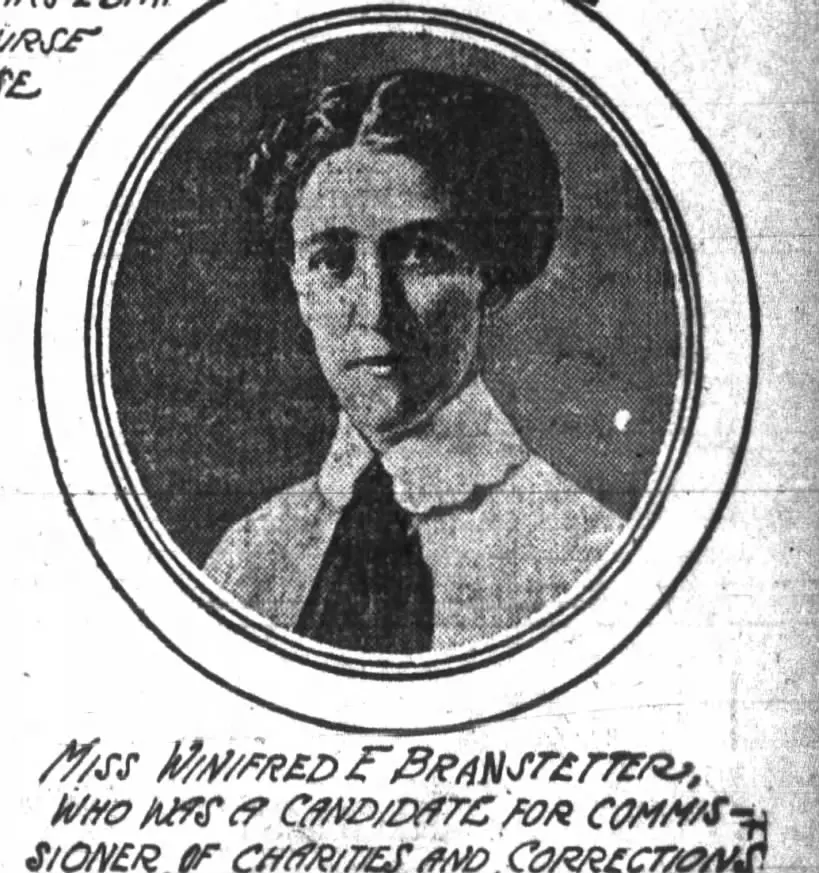
- Branstetter's photo from a 1911 newspaper

Secretary of the Socialist Party of New Mexico
- In office February 1908 – August 1909
- Preceded by: Established

Personal details
- Born: Winifred Estelle Shirley; March 19, 1879 Hick City, Missouri
- Died: November 15, 1960 (aged 81) Providence, Rhode Island
- Resting place: Swan Point Cemetery
- Party: Socialist Party of America
- Spouse: Otto Branstetter (m. 1899; died 1924)
- Children: 2
- Known for: Founder and first Secretary of the Socialist Party of New Mexico; founding member of the Women's National Committee

Winifred Estelle Branstetter (née Shirley; March 19, 1879 – November 15, 1960) was an American suffragette, writer, and Socialist Party of America politician. Branstetter organized for the Socialist Party of America in Oklahoma, New Mexico, and Illinois, serving as the first Secretary of the Socialist Party of New Mexico.

In 1910, she was the Socialist Party's nominee for Oklahoma Commissioner of Charities and Corrections. She was active in the Oklahoma Woman's Suffrage Association, serving as vice-president for three years, and the socialist Women's National Committee, serving as an officer in 1913. She wrote for The Socialist Woman magazine.

== Early life, marriage, and family ==
Winnie Estelle Shirley was born in Hick City, Missouri on March 19, 1879, to Ambrose and Gertrude Prather Shirley. Winnie had homestead with her father in Cleveland County in the Land Rush of 1889, before moving to Kansas City in 1890. She went to Kansas City schools and worked as a department store clerk until she met and married Otto Branstetter in 1899. In 1900, the newlyweds relocated to her family's homestead in Cleveland County. The couple moved to Norman, Oklahoma (then Norman, Oklahoma Territory) in 1904. They had two children: Gertrude and Theresa.

== Career ==
In 1908, Branstetter was elected secretary of the Socialist Party of Oklahoma and served as a delegate to the national Socialist Party of America convention. She was one of 19 women elected as delegates to the 1908 convention. She was one of the founding members of the Women's National Committee within the party and served as their national secretary.

=== New Mexico ===
After the 1908 convention, Branstetter moved with her two daughters to Roswell, New Mexico to homestead, found the Socialist Party of New Mexico, and serve as the first secretary of the new party. She served in this position between February 1908 and August 1909. She was her party's nominee for Superintendent of Schools in Estancia, New Mexico in 1908. After her homestead claim was approved in September 1909, she sold her New Mexico farm and returned to Oklahoma.

=== Return to Oklahoma ===
In 1910, she was an Oklahoma delegate to the Socialist Party of America Convention. The same year, she worked as an associate editor for The Oklahoma Pioneer and was the Socialist nominee for Oklahoma Commissioner of Charities and Corrections. She placed 3rd, behind the Democratic and Republican Parties' nominees. In 1911, she was elected to the state executive committee and the Women's National Committee for the party. In 1912, she was an Oklahoma delegate to the National Suffrage Convention in Philadelphia. She was a suffragette and served as the vice-president of the Oklahoma Woman's Suffrage Association for three years.

=== Chicago and later years ===
She and Otto moved to Chicago in 1913 where she continued to serve as an officer for the Women's National Committee. During World War I, Branstetter was the liaison for the national office to imprisoned anti-war socialists imprisoned at Leavenworth, Kansas. In 1921, she served as a delegate for Cook County to the Amnesty International Conference in Washington D.C.

== Advocacy ==
Branstetter advocated working with existing suffragette organizations to help recruit for the Socialist Party of America while organizing for the right to vote. She considered woman's suffrage vital to allowing women to fight capitalism that subjected women to low-paying jobs, farm labor, and dependency on marriage. Suffrage would allow women to vote for political and economic equality. She was a frequent contributor to The Socialist Woman, writing articles for women's suffrage and against child labor aimed towards the wives of tenant farmers in Oklahoma.

In her 1910 essay "To The Socialist Women of Oklahoma," Branstetter argues capitalism is the primary cause of child labor, the gender pay gap, and prostitution and calls on socialist women to actively organize. In "The Same Story" from the same year, she recounted a meeting with a destitute man who had left his wife and daughter to travel and find work. In the essay, she buys him lunch, tells him about her own experiences with poverty, and listens to his story. She concludes by reflecting on the economic hardship his wife and daughter will face without him.

Branstetter also published feminist short stories, such as her 1911 short story Meta.

== Death ==
Branstetter died on November 15, 1960, in Providence, Rhode Island and was buried at Swan Point Cemetery.

== Electoral history ==
1910 Oklahoma Commissioner of Charities and Corrections general election
Party	Candidate	Votes	%
Democratic	Kate Barnard (incumbent)	120,703	51.05%
Republican	Kate Himrod Biggers	91,907	38.86%
Socialist	Winnie Branstetter	23,872	10.09%
Total votes		236,482	100.0
Democratic hold			
