= Stillwell H. Russell =

American politician

S. H. Russell

Justice of the Oklahoma Supreme Court
- In office March 16, 1914 – May 16, 1914
- Appointed by: Lee Cruce
- Preceded by: Robert L. Williams
- Succeeded by: W. R. Bleakmore

Personal details
- Born: Stillwell Heady Russell; February 14, 1846 Marshall, Harrison County, Texas
- Died: May 16, 1914 (aged 68) Oklahoma City, Oklahoma County, Oklahoma
- Occupation: lawyer, politician, U.S. marshal, soldier in the Confederate Army,

Stillwell Heady Russell (1846–1914) was a Texas lawyer, politician, U.S. marshal, soldier in the Confederate Army, and, at the time of his death, justice of the Oklahoma Supreme Court. Born in Marshall, Harrison County, Texas and living in Texas through a long political career, he moved to what would become the state of Oklahoma in 1899 to practice law. In 1914, he was appointed to fill a vacancy on the Oklahoma Supreme Court, but he died after serving only two months.

== Early life ==
S. H. Russell was born in Brazoria County, Texas on Valentine's Day (February 14), 1846 to William Jarvis (1802–1881) and Eleanor (Heady) Russell (1817–1890). (Note: His unusual given names were bestowed to honor his mother's father, a notable Kentuckian named Stillwell Heady.) Little about his early life has been published except that he attended the Texas Military Institute and farmed until the U.S. Civil War intruded. He enlisted as a private in the 25th Regiment of the Texas Cavalry, fighting for the Confederate Army. His military career was evidently unremarkable, because he emerged as still a private at the end of hostilities.

Returning to civilian life, Russell got a job as a clerk in a Brazoria, Texas dry goods store. He used his spare time to study law in the offices of Lathrop & McCormick. In 1869, he was admitted to the Texas bar, and soon after moved to Galveston, Texas.

== Texas politics ==
Russell was selected as City Attorney for both Houston and Galveston in 1870. Texas Governor Edmund Davis appointed Russell as District Attorney, covering both Harrison and Rusk Counties in northeast Texas. He held that post until 1872, when he was elected sheriff of Harrison County, remaining in that position until 1876. In 1875, he was also a delegate to the Texas State Constitutional Convention, where he served on committees for the Legislative Department and Revenue and Taxation.

Russell decided to run for election to the U.S. House of Representatives from Texas's 2nd congressional district. Despite winning endorsements from both the Tyler Index and the Galveston Daily News, his one-term incumbent Democratic opponent, David B. Culberson, beat him handily in the 1876 general election. (Note: The vote count was 17,326 for Culberson and 9,130 for Russell.) Undaunted, he ran for Harrison County tax collector in 1877 and won the post. He resigned for unknown reasons in the same year, and in 1878 was appointed by President Rutherford B. Hayes as U.S. Marshal for the Western District of Texas.

In the late 1870s, Russell headed an investigation of train robberies allegedly committed by the notorious Sam Bass gang. This had no positive effect on his political career. In November 1882, he ran for election again to the U.S. Congress, this time against Democrat James Henry Jones in Texas's 3rd congressional district, losing 14,045 votes to 9,492.

== Legal problems and prison sentence ==
In March 1882, investigators discovered irregularities in some of the accounts kept by Russell's deputies, which were distributed over an enormous area stretching from the Arkansas border to El Paso. Several suits were brought against him during the month. In May, he was charged with misappropriating government funds, arrested, and put under a $4,000 bond. More charges were made in early 1883, "on the account of irregularities in summoning juries". Russell went on trial in San Antonio starting March 29, 1883. By the end of April, Russell was convicted of "rendering false accounts to the government." Monetary claims were in the range of $50,000. He was sentenced to two years in prison, to be served at the Illinois State Penitentiary at Chester, Illinois.

Many supporters — and some of his political opponents — argued that Russell was the subject of a political prosecution led by Brewster Cameron, a Department of Justice official who was the nephew of Attorney General Benjamin H. Brewster and son of former Senator Simon Cameron. (The so-called Cameron machine dominated Pennsylvania politics for decades.) The Dallas Daily Herald, a Democratic newspaper, editorialized: "Every cunning device that money could provide was employed in securing Russell's conviction...Unhappily for Russell, it is said, that he once kicked Brewster Cameron, a nephew of the department of justice, out of his presence and it is for this worthy act, and not as alleged for the laches or thefts of his deputies that he is consigned to prison...Never was power more despotically or wickedly employed. The people do not revolt, but from the press and countless citizens and from partisan friends and enemies, from Republicans and Democrats everywhere in Texas, and even from citizens of Washington petitions are sent up urging the president to pardon S. H. Russell."

The Washington Post described Russell as the victim of intraparty Republican politics: "[Brewster] Cameron, of the Department of Justice, was Russell's enemy...Russell dressed well and is self-willed and self-reliant. He was hated, therefore, by many vulgar people. The Department of Justice was invoked to destroy him. He was indicted again and again, and again and again he was tried and acquitted. He was utterly impoverished by these prosecutions, ever failing and ever renewed. The government's purse was infinitely larger than Mr. Russell's...poor Russell was undone. He is penniless and must crack stone two years in a northern penitentiary. Corkscrew Cameron willed it and the Department of Justice effervescing with exquisite delight gloats over the downfall of a citizen victimized by malice and limitless wealth and power wielded by Corkscrew Cameron."

By July 1883, Russell had been assigned to a prison clerkship and to work in the brickyard. Some of Russell's friends and supporters started a campaign for his early release. (Note: One of these supporters was former Texas representative and judge Anthony Banning "A.B." Norton, who went to Washington, D.C., to plead the case. Norton was a newspaper editor and publisher who was also a member of the Texas Constitutional Convention of 1866 representing Henderson, Kaufman and Van Zandt Counties. He also served as judge of the Fifth Judicial District of Texas (1868), postmaster of Dallas (1875) and United States marshal for northern Texas (1879).) Russell was released in February 1885, after serving 21 months. He went to live in Denison, Texas, where he reestablished his law practice, and later to Dallas.

Russell returned to public life after his prison term, his reputation apparently undamaged. In 1892, running on a Republican/Populist fusion ticket, Russell was nearly elected Dallas County attorney, losing to Democrat C. B. Gillespie by less than 1,000 votes and winning 9 of 12 wards in the city of Dallas.

== Move to Oklahoma ==
By 1895, the Texas chapter of the International Order of Odd Fellows selected him as a delegate to its convention in Atlantic City, New Jersey. In April 1899, he participated in an IOOF encampment in Oklahoma Territory, where he decided to start a new life. He and Edgar Wilhelm opened a law office in Ardmore in December 1899. Shortly after Oklahoma became a state on November 16, 1907, he returned to politics, leaving the Republican fold to become a member of the Democratic party. He was elected judge of Oklahoma's 8th judicial district, then reelected in 1910, defeating Republican James Humphrey by a vote of 2,797 to 1,204.

In 1914, incumbent Associate Justice Robert L. Williams resigned his seat on the Oklahoma Supreme Court to run for governor. Incumbent governor Lee Cruce appointed Russell as Williams' replacement. Russell took the oath of office on March 16.

== Death ==
Soon after his appointment, Justice Russell became ill at a meeting of the Oklahoma Bar Association. He died on May 16, 1914 in his room at the Lee-Huckins Hotel in Oklahoma City. The cause of death was called "a weak heart," with an "attack of acute indigestion" as a contributing factor.

Justice Russell's body was conveyed to Ardmore, Oklahoma, where his funeral was conducted at the First Presbyterian Church on May 20, 1914. A large number of state dignitaries attended the service. Oklahoma Supreme Court Chief Justice F. E. Riddle eulogized him thusly: "At the bar, he was a learned and ingenious advocate, possessing a brilliant and persuasive eloquence. On the bench, his love of justice, his candor and modesty, were no less distinguished than his learning, acuteness and discrimination."
