= Ada Wills Garside =

American photographer

- Born: Ada Wills; February 18, 1870; Brown County, Ohio, U.S.
- Died: March 7, 1950 (aged 80); Ponca City, Oklahoma, U.S.
- Occupation: Photographer
- Known for: One of the first photographers of Oklahoma Territory

Ada Exira Wills Garside (February 18, 1870 – March 7, 1950) was an American photographer known for her photography in Oklahoma Territory and later Oklahoma. She photographed Native Americans, the Chilocco Indian School, and the Solar eclipse of May 28, 1900.

== Early life and family ==
Ada Wills Garside was born in Brown County, Ohio, the daughter of Thomas L. Wills and Elizabeth Morris Wills. In 1875, her family moved to Iowa. She married Henry L. Garside on December 24, 1890. She moved to Villisca, Iowa in 1895, Stanberry, Missouri in 1897, and finally settled in Newkirk, Oklahoma Territory in 1899.

== Photography and other work ==
Garside became interested in photography by 1897. After moving to Oklahoma, she became one of the first progressional photographers in the territory alongside other pioneers such as Emma Alfreda White Coleman and Annette Ross Hume. Her photography business was one of the most complete in the territory, offering a dozen photos from 25 cents to $12 and even offering Kodak camera rentals. During her career, she photographed Native Americans, the Chilocco Indian School, and the Solar eclipse of May 28, 1900. She photographed the Kay County Courthouse in 1910.

== Death ==
Garside's husband died on October 7, 1928. Later in life she was a Sunday School superintendent, and a member of the Newkirk Study Club. Garside died on March 7, 1950, in Ponca City, Oklahoma.
