= Emma Alfreda White Coleman =

Oklahoma photographer (1863–1949)

- Born: Emma Alfreda White; 1863; Clarinda, Iowa
- Died: June 7, 1949; Norman, Oklahoma
- Occupation: Photographer
- Known for: One of the first photographers of Oklahoma Territory

Emma Alfreda White Coleman was an American photographer in Oklahoma Territory and later Oklahoma. She opened the Norman Art Gallery and took early photographs of the Oklahoma Sanitarium and the University of Oklahoma.

== Early life and family ==
Emma Alfreda White Coleman was born in 1863 to Amanda and David White in Clarinda, Iowa. She married Albert Elmer Coleman and none of their children survived to adulthood. She moved to Norman, Oklahoma Territory, shortly after the Land Run of 1889. She worked as a seamstress after moving to Norman.

== Photography ==
Coleman took up photography in Oklahoma, joining early pioneers Ada Wills Garside and Annette Ross Hume as one of the first photographers in Oklahoma Territory. In 1898, she opened the Norman Art Gallery, which she ran until 1918. She owned four cameras, and her clients included individuals, families, sports teams, the Choctaw Nation, the University of Oklahoma, and the Oklahoma Sanitarium. She was a member of the Photographers' Association of Oklahoma.

== Death and legacy ==
Coleman died on June 7, 1949, in Norman, Oklahoma. Her photographs are archived at the University of Oklahoma.
