= G. A. Brown =

American judge

Justice of the Oklahoma Supreme Court
- In office November 1914 – October 15, 1915
- Preceded by: F. E. Riddle
- Succeeded by: Charles M. Thacker

Personal details
- Born: Gibson A. Brown; 1849 Washington County, Texas
- Died: October 15, 1915 (aged 65–66)

Gibson A. Brown (better known as G. A. Brown) (1849 – 1915) was a native of Washington County, Texas. His parents were James P. and Mary A. (née Bryan), both natives of Georgia who had moved to a farm in 1847. Brown became an attorney and moved to Greer County, Texas.

== Legal education and early career ==
After graduating from public school, he studied law in the office of former Texas governor James W. Throckmorton (1825-1894) in Sherman, Texas, where he continued practicing law with Gov. Throckmorton. (Note: Throckmorton's law partner, Thomas J. Brown, was an uncle of G. A. and participated with Throckmorton in teaching the young man until he was ready for admission to the bar in 1873. Thomas, who served as an associate justice of the Texas Supreme Court for over twenty years was serving as Chief Justice at the time his nephew became a lawyer.)

== Career in Texas ==
G. A. then joined the Throckmorton and Brown firm as a junior partner, until he moved to Clarendon in Donley County, Texas in 1882, where he was appointed county judge. After serving two terms, he resigned to devote his time to private law practice. In 1889, he was named judge of the newly-created Texas 44th Judicial District by Texas Governor, L. S. Ross, and moved his residence to Vernon in Wilbarger County, Texas. He was re-elected three times, remaining in office until 1903.

The State of Texas had created Greer County in 1860, and thereafter claimed jurisdiction over it, but this issue had been argued in the United States courts at several levels and for many years. By 1896, the issue had already been litigated again. At last, the Supreme Court rejected Texas' claims. The U.S. Congress quickly passed legislation that declared the land as under the jurisdiction of the Federal Government and attached it to the Territory of Oklahoma, effective May 4, 1896.

A local legend claimed that Judge Brown was trying an important case that morning when he was interrupted by a messenger who brought him the news that had just arrived on the telegraph. Judge Brown immediately adjourned the court and announced that he no longer had jurisdiction over the case. He allegedly announced to everyone in the courtroom that "... We opened court in Greer County, Texas, but will close court in Greer County, Oklahoma."

Many settlers in the county were concerned about the status of their claims over land they had bought while it was still part of Texas. They asked Brown to go to Washington to secure their claims. He agreed, and after meeting with President Cleveland and Attorney General Harmon, who concurred. Congress quickly passed the necessary legislation to secure these prior claims.

== Career in Oklahoma ==
Brown moved in 1903 to the town of Magnum, then in Greer County, Oklahoma Territory.

After Oklahoma became a state on November 16, 1907, Brown was elected Judge of the Oklahoma 18th Judicial District. He was reelected to that position in November, 1910. In the election of November 1914, Brown was elected to the Supreme Court of Oklahoma, filling the unexpired term of Judge Jesse Dunn, who had died during his term, even as Brown moved his own family to Oklahoma City. Judge Brown himself died while in office on October 15, 1915.

== Personal life ==
In 1875, Brown married Miss Adela H. Davis, daughter of a Louisiana doctor, E. K. Davis, and step-daughter of John A. Fain, of Denton, Texas, and became parents of four children. Brown was a York Rite Mason, past master of the lodge, past high priest of the Royal Arch Chapter and a member of the Knights Templar.
