= Louise Fluke =

Designer of the Flag of Oklahoma

- Born: Louise Trimmier Funk; February 9, 1900; Van Buren, Arkansas, U.S.
- Died: July 27, 1986 (aged 86); Oklahoma City, Oklahoma, U.S.
- Resting place: Fairview Cemetery, Shawnee, Oklahoma, U.S.
- Occupation: Art teacher
- Known for: Flag design

Louise Trimmier Fluke (née Funk; February 9, 1900 – July 27, 1986) was an American art teacher and designer of the Oklahoma state flag.

== Biography ==
Louise Trimmier Funk was born in Van Buren, Arkansas, to Richard Waller and Nancy Trimmier (née Sloan) Funk. She moved to Shawnee, Oklahoma, with her family a year later. As a young girl she received art lessons from Marjorie Dodge Tapp. After graduating from Shawnee High School, she continued her art lessons at Columbia University and the Chicago Art Institute. After returning to Shawnee, she married George Fluke on December 18, 1924.

In July, 1925, the Flukes moved to Ponca City, Oklahoma. She continued living there even after her husband died in 1953. She survived an automobile accident that claimed the life of her husband. She raised their son, who was also named George. She worked as a substitute art teacher in the Ponca City public schools, served as President of the Twentieth Century Club and was a regent of the Daughters of the American Revolution. In 1982, her activities were recognized with the Pioneer Woman Award by Governor George Nigh at the Marland Mansion Renaissance Ball.

Fluke died of pneumonia on July 27, 1986, at the age of 86.

== Oklahoma flag ==
Fluke flag proposal (1925)

While sewing her own wedding gown, she learned that the state organization of the Daughters of the American Revolution had announced a contest to design a new state flag. Her fiancé encouraged her to take the time to enter the contest. She took three weeks to study artifacts at the Oklahoma Historical Society, and entered five different designs. The Daughters of the American Revolution judges picked one of hers as the winner. The legislature approved Fluke's flag proposal on March 25, 1926.

On April 2, 2005, the 80th anniversary of her version of the flag flying above the Oklahoma State Capitol, Fluke’s descendants presented the Oklahoma Senate with an original large silk flag that was both sewn and painted by hand. Fluke had signed the banner; her signature is quite visible on the right-hand side below the shield. The flag has been treated and mounted in a pressurized gilt frame.
