= Marvin B. Prentiss =

Member of the Oklahoma House of Representatives from the Osage County district
- In office 1912–1914 Serving with Charles Bowers Peters

Personal details
- Born: Metamora, Ohio, United States
- Died: May 3, 1953 (aged 83) Nowata, Oklahoma, United States
- Party: Republican

Marvin B. Prentiss was an American politician who served in the Oklahoma House of Representatives representing Osage County from 1912 to 1914. A member of the Republican Party, he was the party's nominee for Oklahoma Secretary of State in the 1914 Oklahoma elections.

== Biography ==
Marvin B. Prentiss was born in Metamora, Ohio, and moved to Fairfax, Oklahoma, in 1906. He was a doctor. He served in the Oklahoma House of Representatives as a member of the Republican Party representing Osage County in the 4th Oklahoma Legislature. His seat was established in 1912 and disestablished in 1914. He was the Republican nominee for Oklahoma Secretary of State in the 1914 Oklahoma elections. He moved to Nowata, Oklahoma, in 1929 and worked there until he moved to Claremont, Florida, in 1943. He retired in 1948 and he died on May 3, 1953, in Nowata, Oklahoma.
