= W. R. Bleakmore =

Justice of the Oklahoma Supreme Court
- In office May 1914 – January 1915
- Appointed by: Lee Cruce
- Preceded by: Stillwell H. Russell
- Succeeded by: Summers T. Hardy

Personal details
- Born: September 22, 1872 Richmond, Virginia, U.S.
- Died: 1955
- Party: Democratic Party
- Education: University of Michigan

Willard Ransom Bleakmore was an American attorney and judge who briefly served on the Oklahoma Supreme Court in 1914.

== Biography ==
Willared Ransom Bleakmore was born on September 22, 1872, in Richmond, Virginia, but grew up in Iowa before graduating from the University of Michigan. He moved to Oklahoma Territory in 1890, settling in Oklahoma City. In 1894, he moved to Ardmore, Oklahoma, where he was partner to the law firm Cruce, Cruce, and Bleakmore alongside Lee Cruce.

In 1912, he was elected county attorney for Carter County, Oklahoma. After Oklahoma Supreme Court Justice Stillwell H. Russell died in May 1914, Cruce appointed Bleakmore his successor. During his tenure he authored 47 opinions, 46 majority opinions and one concurring opinion. He was a member of the Democratic Party.

He left the court after the 1914 Oklahoma elections and later worked on the Oklahoma Supreme Court Commission, as an assistant attorney general, and as counsel for Rock Island Railway. He retired in 1946 and died in 1955.

== Works cited ==
- Creel, Von Russell (2015). "Short Tenures on the Supreme Court of Oklahoma" (PDF). Chronicles of Oklahoma. 93 (1): 46–71.
- Pickett, Norman N.; Allis, Daniel (1965). "Supreme Courts: Oklahoma and the United States--A Studied Comparison of Systems". Tulsa Law Review. 2 (2): 138–147.
