= William D. Matthews (politician) =

American politician (d. 1930)

2nd Oklahoma Commissioner of Charities and Corrections
- In office January 1915 – January 1923
- Preceded by: Kate Barnard
- Succeeded by: Mabel Bassett

Personal details
- Born: January 11, 1846 Holly Springs, Mississippi, United States
- Died: April 18, 1930 (aged 84) Oklahoma City, Oklahoma, United States
- Party: Democratic Party

William D. Matthews (January 11, 1846 – April 18, 1930) was an American politician who served as the Oklahoma commissioner of charities and corrections from 1915 to 1923.

== Biography ==
William D. Matthews was born on January 11, 1846, near Holly Springs, Mississippi. During the American Civil War he served in the Confederate States of America Army under John Hunt Morgan. He married his wife in 1868. After the war he became a Methodist preacher and in 1880 he moved to Oklahoma Territory. He moved to Oklahoma City after being appointed chaplain for the 4th Oklahoma Legislature. He ran in the 1914 Oklahoma elections for Oklahoma commissioner of charities and corrections in a nine candidate Democratic Party primary that included Mabel Bassett and Czarina Conlan. He placed first and was the Democratic nominee. He later won the general election. He was preceded in office by Kate Barnard and served two terms until he was succeeded by Mabel Bassett in 1923. He died on April 18, 1930, in Oklahoma City.

== Electoral history ==
Oklahoma Commissioner of Charities and Corrections Democratic primary (August 4, 1914)
Party	Candidate	Votes	%
Democratic	William D. Matthews	21,720	20.1%
Democratic	Mabel Bassett	19,083	17.7%
Democratic	Ruth Dickinson Clement	13,666	12.6%
Democratic	Frank Naylor	13,563	12.5%
Democratic	Anna Laskey	11,906	11.0%
Democratic	Dorothy Briley	8,654	8.0%
Democratic	Ella Bilbo	7,488	6.9%
Democratic	Czarina Conlan	7,426	6.8%
Democratic	Roxanna R. Oxford	4,296	3.9%
Turnout		107812	

1914 Oklahoma Commissioner of Charities and Corrections election
Party	Candidate	Votes	%	±%
Democratic	William D. Matthews	105,663	44.0%	−7.0%
Republican	Alice A. Curtice	76,167	31.7%	−7.1%
Socialist	Florence Anderson	52,984	22.0%	+12.0%
Progressive	Laura M. McClain	4,612	1.9%	New
Prohibition	Hettie H. Leonard	694	0.2%	New
Democratic hold		Swing		
