= List of flags of Oklahoma =

This is a list of flags used currently or historically in Oklahoma.

== State flag ==
Flag	Date	Use	Description
	1925 (Standardized in 2006)	State and civil flag	A rectangular field of light blue on which is placed an Osage war shield with six crosses and seven pendant eagle feathers above the word 'Oklahoma' in white. Superimposed onto the crosses of the war shield is a calumet and an olive branch. 2:3 aspect ratio
	1957	Governor's flag	A green field charged with the Seal of Oklahoma, surrounded by five white five-pointed stars.

== Military flags ==
Flag	Date	Use	Description
		Oklahoma Army National Guard Headquarters	A blue field, defaced with the insignia of the Oklahoma Army National Guard on a light blue shield.
		Oklahoma ARNG 90th Troop Command	A tricolor of blue-maize-blue, defaced with the insignia of the Washington Army National Guard.

== City flags ==
Flag	Date	Use	Description
		Flag of Oklahoma City	A white field with a red frame, charged with the city seal.
	2018	Flag of Tulsa	Upper navy blue half and lower beige half, separated by a gold horizontal line, with a gold shield on the left third, containing a red circle and beige six-pointed star.
		Flag of Norman	
		Flag of Enid	

== Historic flags ==
Flag	Date	Use	Description
	1860-1866	Choctaw Nation flag	A blue banner, charged with a red disc with a white border, with a bow, arrows, and a peace pipe in the middle. This banner was used in the American Civil War (though adopted before such), and later by the Choctaw Youth Movement.
	1861	Confederate Choctaw flag	the Stars and Bars with a red star in the center of the canton.
	1861-1865	1st Cherokee Mounted Rifles flag	A variant of the Stars and Bars, with five red stars in the middle of the canton, and "CHEROKEE BRAVES" in the white stripe in red text.
	1911-1925	State flag	A red banner, charged with a white five-pointed star with a blue border, with the number "46" contained within it.
	1925-1941	State flag	Similar to the current flag, without "OKLAHOMA" on it.
	1941-1988	State flag	Word "Oklahoma" added in 1941.
	1988-2006	State flag	Same as the 1941-1988 flag, but with a darker shade of blue.

== Tribal flags ==
Flag	Date	Use	Description
	1978	Flag of the Cherokee Nation	Seal of the Cherokee Nation on an orange field, surrounded by seven yellow stars with seven points, each of the stars points toward the star in the center of the seal, with the seven-pointed representing the seven clans of the Cherokee, surrounded by a green-and-black rope edging.. Modified in 1989 with a black seven-pointed star added to the upper right-hand corner of the flag to represent those lost on the Trail of Tears.
	1978	Flag of the Chickasaw Nation	Seal of the Chickasaw Nation on a navy blue field.
	1978	Flag of the Choctaw Nation	Seal of the Choctaw Nation on a dark purple background.
	2025	Flag of the Osage Nation	Seal of the Osage Nation on a sky blue background.
