= Ruth Dickinson Clement =

American politician (1873–1953)

- Born: Ruth Dickinson; December 20, 1873; Caldwell County, Kentucky, United States
- Died: May 28, 1953 (aged 79); Tulsa, Oklahoma, United States
- Known for: Designing 1st Flag of Oklahoma.
- Political party: Democratic Party

Ruth Dickinson Clement (December 20, 1873 – May 28, 1953) was an American politician who is best known for designing the first Flag of Oklahoma.

== Biography ==
Ruth Dickinson Clement was born Ruth Dickinson on December 20, 1873, to W. P. Dickinson and Louisa Monroe Dickinson in Caldwell County, Kentucky. She moved to Ardmore, Oklahoma Territory, in the 1890s where she married William Richard Clement, a brother-in-law of Lee Cruce. The couple had one child and later moved to Marquette, Kansas. In 1904, her family moved to Oklahoma City. In 1909 she became the president of the Oklahoma City Federation of Women's Clubs. In 1910 she joined the Women of '89 club and in 1910 she was the president of the Oklahoma Division of the United Daughters of the Confederacy. In 1911, she designed a state flag supported by Governor Cruce which was adopted as the Flag of Oklahoma on March 2, 1911. It remained the state flag until 1925. In July 1911, Cruce appointed her to the board of trustees of the Oklahoma Confederate Home. In 1914, she ran for Oklahoma Commissioner of Charities and Corrections in the Democratic Party primary. She placed third, behind William D. Matthews and Mabel Bassett. She joined the Daughters of the American Revolution in 1915. Clement died on May 28, 1953, in Tulsa.

== Electoral history ==
Oklahoma Commissioner of Charities and Corrections Democratic primary (August 4, 1914)
Party	Candidate	Votes	%
Democratic	William D. Matthews	21,720	20.1%
Democratic	Mabel Bassett	19,083	17.7%
Democratic	Ruth Dickinson Clement	13,666	12.6%
Democratic	Frank Naylor	13,563	12.5%
Democratic	Anna Laskey	11,906	11.0%
Democratic	Dorothy Briley	8,654	8.0%
Democratic	Ella Bilbo	7,488	6.9%
Democratic	Czarina Conlan	7,426	6.8%
Democratic	Roxanna R. Oxford	4,296	3.9%
Turnout		107812	
