= Estelle Chisholm Ward =

Native American journalist

- June 19, 1938
- Born: Estelle Chisholm; June 18, 1875; Chism, Chickasaw Nation, Indian Territory
- Died: December 9, 1946 (aged 71); Oklahoma City, Oklahoma
- Citizenship: Chickasaw Nation, American
- Occupation(s): educator, journalist, publisher, and political activist
- Years active: 1900–1946
- Known for: first Chickasaw woman to represent the tribe's interests in Washington, D. C.

Estelle Chisholm Ward (June 18, 1875 – December 9, 1946) was a Chickasaw teacher, journalist, and magazine publisher from Oklahoma. She was active in politics both civic and tribal and was elected as county treasurer of Johnston County, Oklahoma. Ward was the first woman to represent the Chickasaw Nation as a delegate to Washington, DC.

== Early life ==
Estelle Chisholm was born on June 18, 1875, in Chism, in the Chickasaw Nation of Indian Territory to Julia Ann (née McLish) and William Chisholm. The town was founded and named after her father. Her grandfather was Jesse Chisholm a mixed-blood Cherokee-Scottish trader, after whom the Chisholm Trail was named. Her mother's parents were Ginny "Gincy" (née Colbert) and George Frazier McLish, who were of Chickasaw and Scottish descent. By her father's first wife, Hester Butler Cochran, she had a half-sister, Caroline, as well as seven full siblings: Eliza, Angeline, Mary V., Alice, Cora Ann, Julia Ann and William Jr.

Chisholm attended the Bloomfield Academy and after graduating, taught in the school for a couple of years. She then attended Kidd College in Sherman, Texas, from 1894 to 1895, before moving to Bowling Green, Kentucky, to attend Potter College.

== Career ==
Upon completing her education, Chisholm began teaching at Burris Chapel School, a neighborhood school that was part of the Chickasaw education system and located near Tishomingo. On December 23, 1896, in the Chickasaw Nation she married William Thomas Ward, who would serve as the long-time auditor of the Chickasaw tribe and later as a deputy United States clerk. They lived on their farm and raised their children in Garrett Township, near Tishomingo through the 1920s and then kept a home in Oklahoma City. She was a member of the National Bureau of Women Speakers and contributed articles to newspapers both inside and outside of Oklahoma. Ward published and edited a magazine in Oklahoma City called the Super Civilized Indian.

Ward was involved in politics and was elected as Johnston County Treasurer, as well as running several campaigns for Republican candidates. In 1928, she attended a convention of Choctaw and Chickasaw tribe members from throughout Oklahoma in Ardmore. The purpose of the convention was to discuss both financial issues and the burdens being placed upon the tribes because of implementation of the Indian Citizenship Act and the Burke Act. The tribes were concerned about the inability to secure funds that were due them from the government for their coal and asphalt lands. They selected committee representatives, all men save Czarina Conlan for the Choctaw tribe and Ward for the Chickasaw, to draft a solution. The committee met to prepare the recommendations and decided to send Conlan and Ward to Washington, D.C. It was the first time women had been sent to Washington as tribal representatives for either tribe. The women's task was to argue in favor of passage of a bill proposed by U.S. House Representative Wilburn Cartwright for sale of the coal and asphalt holdings, as well as continuing the restrictions of selling Indian lands.

Ward died on December 9, 1946, in Oklahoma City, Oklahoma, and was buried at City Cemetery in Tishomingo, Oklahoma.
