= Flag of Oklahoma =

U.S. state flag

Oklahoma
- Other names: Oklahoma flag, Native America's flag
- Use: Civil and state flag
- Proportion: 2∶3
- Adopted: April 2, 1925; 101 years ago (original version); November 1, 2006; 20 years ago (standardized version)
- Design: A rectangular field of light blue on which is placed an Osage war shield with six crosses and seven pendant eagle feathers above the word 'Oklahoma' in white. Superimposed onto the crosses of the war shield is a calumet and an olive branch.
- Designed by: Louise Fluke

The flag of the U.S. state of Oklahoma, also known as the Oklahoma flag, is a rectangular field of sky blue on which is placed an Osage war shield with six crosses and seven pendant eagle feathers above the name of the state in a white Eurostile text in all capitals. Superimposed onto the crosses of the war shield is a calumet (peace pipe) and an olive branch.

== Statute ==
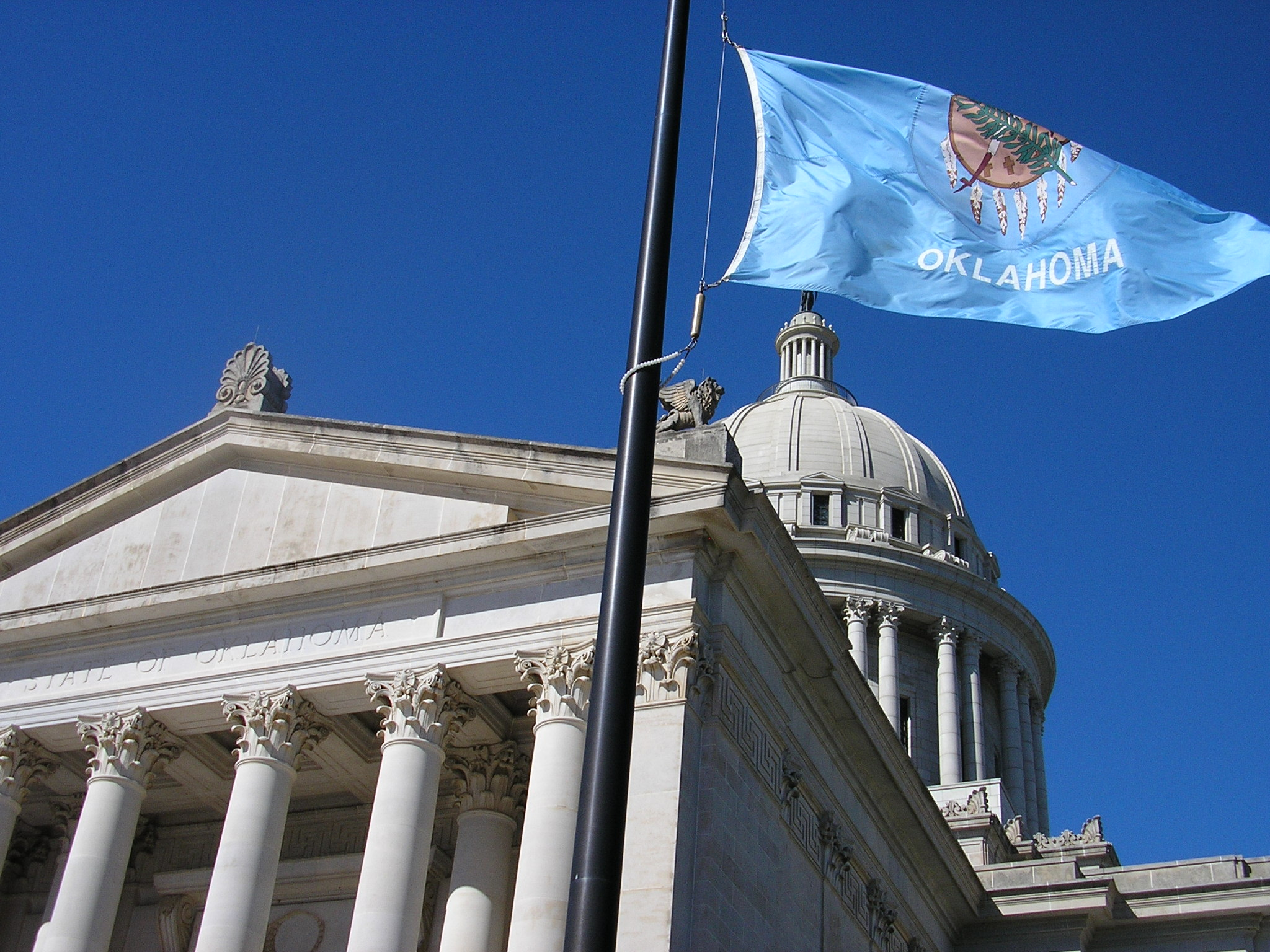
The Flag of Oklahoma flying outside the Capitol in 2007.

The 2024 Oklahoma Statutes, Title 25, §25-91, defines that the state flag shall be:

A sky blue field with a circular rawhide shield of an American Indian Warrior, decorated with six painted crosses on the face thereof, the lower half of the shield to be fringed with seven pendant eagle feathers and superimposed upon the face of the shield a calumet or peace pipe, crossed at right angles by an olive branch, as illustrated by the design accompanying this resolution, and underneath said shield or design in white letters shall be placed the word "Oklahoma"...

It is further specified that:

1. The Osage Indian warrior's circular rawhide shield of amber buckskin is center upon a field of French Blue. On the face of the shield shall be six small gold brown crosses that match the thongs lacing the edge of the shield. The vertical bar of each cross shall be twenty-five percent (25%) longer than the horizontal bar, the lower width line of which shall be placed at the fifty percent (50%) mark of the vertical bar and the top width line shall be placed at the top twenty-five percent (25%) mark of the vertical bar. The width of the horizontal bar shall be seventy-five percent (75%) of the vertical bar;

2. The edge of the lower half of the shield shall be fringed with seven pendant eagle feathers of white tipped with gold brown;

3. Across the face of the shield at right angle shall be a calumet or Indian pipe of peace, which shall have a ruby red bowl, flesh stem and be decorated with a ruby red tassel at the end. Above the calumet, lying at a right angle shall be an olive branch of Dartmouth green; and

4. The name Oklahoma in white letters shall appear under the shield on the face of the flag.

=== Colors ===
The law defining the flag's design (25 OK Stat § 91) also defines its colors as:

Name	Pantone	Usage on Flag
French Blue	285 C	Field
Amber	465 C	Shield
Flesh	486 C	Feather shading; calumet pipe stem
Gold Brown	174 C	Feather shading; crosses and thongs
Ruby Red	195 C	Calumet pipe body and tassel
Dartmouth Green	554 C	Olive branch on calumet

== History ==
=== Territorial flag (late-1800s) ===
Accounting to The Guthrie Daily Leader in 1899, during Governor's C. M. Barnes speech to territorial legislature he mention that the National Guard carried with them a territorial banner bearing the territory's seal on it.

=== First flag (1911–1925) ===
Oklahoma's first flag was adopted in 1911, four years after statehood. The flag featured a large centered white star fimbriated in blue on a red field. The number 46 was written in blue inside the star, as Oklahoma was the forty-sixth state to join the Union. It was designed by Ruth Dickinson Clement, a founder of the state branch of the United Daughters of the Confederacy.

=== Current flag (1925–present) ===
A contest, sponsored by the Daughters of the American Revolution, was held in 1924 to replace the state flag, as red flags were closely associated with the red flag of communism. The winning entry by DAR member Louise Fluke, of Shawnee, Oklahoma, which was adopted as the state flag on April 2, 1925, resembled the current flag without the word Oklahoma on it. That word was added in 1941 as part of an effort to combat widespread illiteracy, although there is no evidence the change to the flag played any significant role in such.

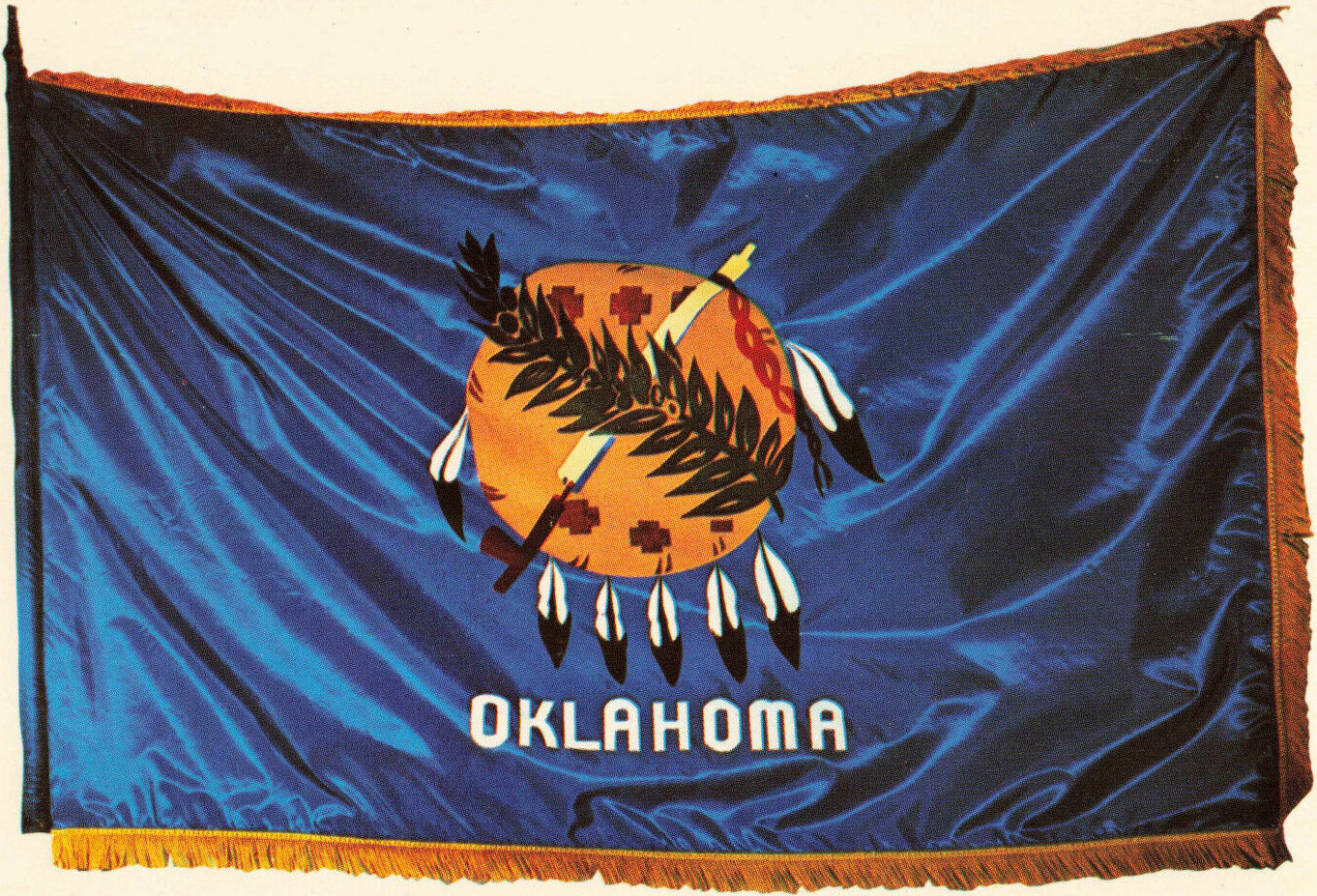
Oklahoman flag from 1961 with erroneous design

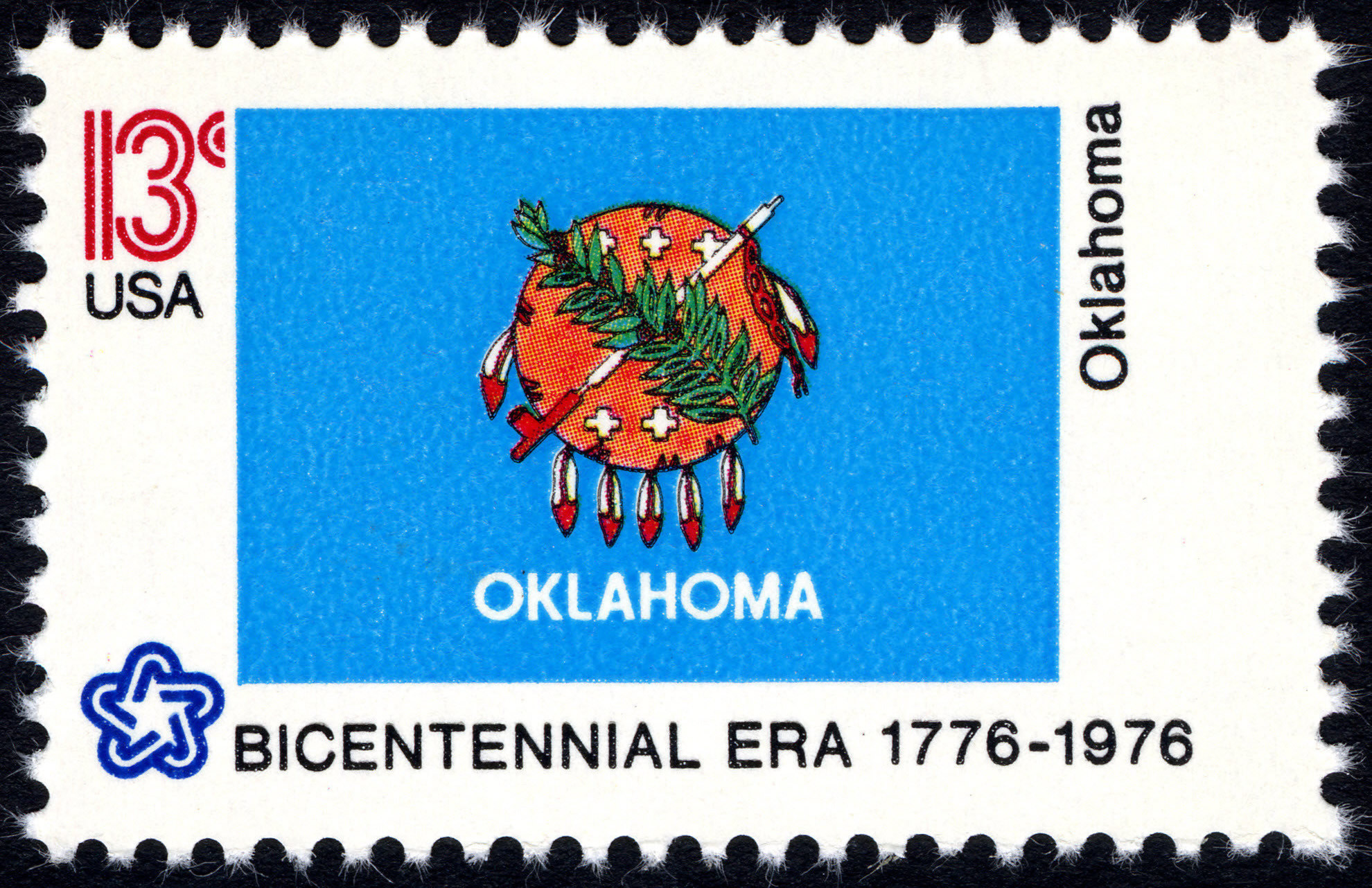
The Oklahoma state flag as depicted in the 1976 bicentennial postage stamp series

The official design of the flag of Oklahoma has remained the same since 1941, however, unauthorized flag designs became prevalent throughout the state, so much so that the correct and official design of the flag was becoming lost. These unauthorized flags displayed stylized eagle feathers, incorrectly shaped crosses, an incorrectly shaped pipe, wrong colors, or combinations of these and other errors. In 2005, an Oklahoma Boy Scout leader designing patches for a National Jamboree contingent was looking for an image of the Oklahoma state flag and noticed that there were multiple unauthorized designs of the Oklahoma state flag displayed on state government, historical, and educational websites. With some research he was able to identify the official design to use, but because of the prevalence of unauthorized designs, he contacted his state representative, and was the impetus to standardize the colors and shapes by Oklahoma Senate Bill 1359 and signed into law by Governor Brad Henry on May 23, 2006, taking effect on November 1, 2006.

State flag (1911–1925)	State flag (1925–1941)	State flag (1941–1988)	State flag (1988–2006)

== Design and symbolism ==
Choctaw flag (1860)

The flag of Oklahoma is one of two U.S. state flags (along with New Mexico) to depict distinct Native American iconography. (Note: The Florida and Massachusetts flags contain state seals depicting Native people.) The blue field represents devotion and loyalty. The shield surmounted by the pipe and olive branch represents defensive or protective warfare, showing a love of peace by a united people. The flag of Oklahoma closely resembles the flag of the Choctaw Nation carried into battle by men of the Second Indian Brigade or "Choctaw Brigade" during the American Civil War. The Choctaw flag, a replica of which hung in the Oklahoma Historical Museum, having been described as a rectangular field of blue, on which was placed a large red circular war shield bordered by a band of white; superimposed upon the face of the shield was a white bow, two arrows, and tomahawk crossed at right angles.

In 2001, the North American Vexillological Association surveyed its members on the designs of the 72 U.S. state, territorial, and Canadian provincial flags and ranked the Oklahoma flag 39th.

== Display and use ==
In 2015, a new specialty license plate honoring the first flag was authorized by the legislature and signed into law. A minimum of 100 pre-orders were required and fulfilled. Later in 2024 the first flag license plate with the addition of Route 66 landmarks became the new standard Oklahoma license plate.

=== Salute ===
The state legislature adopted the following salute to the flag in 1982:

"I salute the Flag of the State of Oklahoma: Its symbols of peace unite all people."

== Flag of the governor of Oklahoma ==
The Oklahoma governor's flag

The Oklahoma governor's flag consists of a green field charged with the seal of Oklahoma, surrounded by a pentagram of five white stars. The five stars symbolize the Five Civilized Tribes. The flag was officially adopted in 1957 and is used as a symbol to mark the presence of the governor of Oklahoma.

== See also ==
- List of flags of Oklahoma
- Flag of the governor of Oklahoma
- List of flags by design
- List of Oklahoma state symbols
- List of U.S. state, district, and territorial insignia
