= Czarina Conlan =

Native American politician

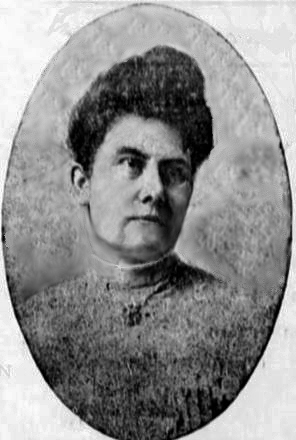
- Conlan in 1906
- Born: Madeline Czarina Colbert; January 14, 1871; Colbert, Chickasaw Nation, Indian Territory
- Died: May 5, 1958 (aged 87); Oklahoma City, Oklahoma
- Other names: Czarina Colbert
- Citizenship: Choctaw Nation, American
- Education: St. Xavier Academy, Baird College, Mary Baldwin College.
- Occupations: museum curator, Native American cultural preservationist, suffragist and Indigenous rights activist
- Years active: 1919-1942
- Known for: first woman to be elected to a school board in Oklahoma and first woman to represent the Choctaw Nation in Washington, D.C.
- Spouse: Michael Conlan
- Children: Lottie Conlan

Madeline Czarina Conlan (1871–1958) was a Native American archivist and museum curator. She worked at the Oklahoma Historical Society museum for 24 years. She founded a woman's club in Indian Territory and served as the chair of the Oklahoma Indian Welfare Committee of the Oklahoma State Federation of Women's Clubs for 12 years. She was the first woman elected to serve on a school board in the state. Although the Attorney General of Oklahoma ruled she could not serve, she defied the order and completed a two-year term on the Lindsay School Board.

In 1928, she was appointed by an assembly of 400 to 500 Choctaw and Chickasaw tribal citizens from throughout Oklahoma to chair their convention and then to represent their interests as ambassador in Washington, D.C., on the pending coal and asphalt resources bill. It was the first time a woman had been sent from either tribe as a representative for their tribe in Washington. She was inducted into the Oklahoma Hall of Fame in 1935.

== Early life ==
Madeline Czarina Colbert was born on January 14, 1871, in Colbert, in the Chickasaw Nation of Indian Territory to Athenius (née Folsom) and James Allen Colbert. Her father was Chickasaw and involved in tribal affairs of the Chickasaw Nation. Colbert's paternal grandfather, Martin Colbert, was involved in the negotiations for the Chickasaw removal from Mississippi to Indian Territory. He chose to remain in Mississippi and accepted state and US citizenship. Levi Colbert, a paternal great-grandfather, served as Andrew Jackson's standard-bearer at the Battle of New Orleans. Colbert's mother was Choctaw and the daughter of Rev. Israel Folsom who was one of the first Native Americans to be ordained as a preacher and to work among the Choctaw. Her great-grandfather, Nathaniel Folsom, married Aiahnichih Ohoyoh, a cousin of noted leader Mushulatubbee.

Colbert attended local Chickasaw schools for a few years before going to a convent school, St. Xavier Academy, in Denison, Texas. She studied at Baird College in Clinton, Missouri, and then did additional work at Mary Baldwin College in Staunton, Virginia, in 1889. She married Michael Conlan, originally of Black River Falls, Wisconsin, on November 6, 1894, in Atoka, in the Choctaw Nation, Indian Territory. They had one child, a daughter named Lottie.

== Career ==
In 1896, Conlan organized the Pioneer Club of Atoka, the first women's club in Indian Territory. In 1898, when the women's clubs of Oklahoma decided to come together as the Federation of Women's Clubs for Oklahoma and Indian Territories, Conlan's group joined the federation. In 1899, she was the only delegate from Indian Territory to attend the convention of the General Federation of Women's Clubs (GFWC) in Los Angeles. (Note: It is unclear if the convention in question was a state convention or if the year is incorrect and it was a national convention. California formed their state organization in 1899 and had a statewide convention in that year. They did not host a national convention until 1902.)

At the time, the GFWC was deeply divided on the issue of race. They did not reach a resolution as to whether the organization would be for "whites only" until 1902. In 1903, when a group of ten Indian Territory women's clubs withdrew from the Oklahoma Federation to form the Federation of Women's Clubs of Indian Territory, Conlan was elected their first president and the group was admitted to GFWC in 1904. In 1908, a year after Oklahoma statehood, the Indian women's group re-merged with the Oklahoma Women's Club.

Conlan served for twelve years as the chair of the Oklahoma Indian Welfare Committee of the Oklahoma State Federation of Women's Clubs (OSFWC). The committee was primarily concerned with health issues for women: they conducted hygiene classes at Indian schools and consulted in maternity issues. In 1926, the organization, under Conlan's direction, prepared an index of Native American cultural contributions. In 1932, she was elected as the Director of the OSFWC, which placed her on the national board of the GFWC.

Conlan was one of the leading suffragists in Oklahoma. She authored a resolution for the national convention of the GFWC held in Boston in 1908 for women to press state legislatures to allow women to serve on school boards if law did not prohibit it. Conlan was the first woman to serve on a school board in Oklahoma, having been elected to the post on the Lindsay School Board a decade before women's suffrage was granted. Though she was elected in 1909, the state Attorney General ruled that she could not serve. Conlan rallied other women and served in defiance of his order for two years. She later ran for the post of Commissioner of Charities and Corrections in 1914.

In 1913, Conlan worked on a Century Chest Project for the Ladies Aid Society of the First English Lutheran Church of Oklahoma City. She was responsible for gathering items from various Oklahoma tribes, including books and documents in their native languages as well as cultural artifacts. The time capsule was opened in 2013 and displayed at the Historical Society Museum.

In 1919, Conlan began working as the curator of the Native American collection of the museum run by the Oklahoma Historical Society. Because she was Choctaw, Conlan was often able to secure gifts and items from tribal citizens for the museum collection that others might not have been able to acquire. She served as the main collector of Native American artifacts and documents for the museum until 1942 when she was dismissed from the post.

In 1928, a convention of Choctaw and Chickasaw tribal citizens from throughout Oklahoma was held in Ardmore. They discussed both financial issues and the burdens being placed upon them due to the passage and implementation of the Indian Citizenship Act and the Burke Act. Since their tribal governments had been abolished, the tribal citizens were concerned about the inability to secure funds that were due to them for their coal and asphalt lands to provide for their tribe members. Those elected as committee representatives were men except for two women who were Conlan for the Choctaw tribe and Estelle Ward for the Chickasaw tribe. Conlan was selected as chair of the convention. The committee met to prepare the recommendations and broke with precedent, sending Conlan and Estelle Chisholm Ward to Washington, D.C., to argue in favor of passage of a bill proposed by U.S. House Representative Wilburn Cartwright for sale of the coal and asphalt holdings, as well as continuing the restrictions of selling Indian lands. It was the first time that women had been sent to Washington as representatives of their tribes. In 1944, Congress finally passed a bill authorizing the sale of the coal and asphalt lands, but there were factions of Choctaw and Chickasaw who were discontented that it had taken so long for their leadership to distribute the funds from the long-promised sale. In the political battle which then ensued between Harry J. W. Belvin and Chief William A. Durant, Conlan threw her support behind Durant, who lost the election. Conlan died on 5 May 1958, in Oklahoma City following a brief illness and was buried at the Fairlawn Cemetery. The Western History Collections at the University of Oklahoma maintains a collection of memorabilia called the "Madeline Czarina Colbert Conlan Collection". which focuses on Choctaw and other Native American documents.

== Awards and recognition ==
In 1933, Conlan was nominated to receive the inaugural Indian Achievement Medal of the Indian Council Fire, though she did not win the award, she was inducted into the Oklahoma Hall of Fame in 1935.

== Death ==
Conlan died on 5 May 1958, in Oklahoma City following a brief illness and was buried at the Fairlawn Cemetery. The Western History Collections at the University of Oklahoma maintains a collection of memorabilia called the "Madeline Czarina Colbert Conlan Collection". which focuses on Choctaw and other Native American documents.

== Electoral history ==
Oklahoma Commissioner of Charities and Corrections Democratic primary (August 4, 1914)
Party	Candidate	Votes	%
Democratic	William D. Matthews	21,720	20.1%
Democratic	Mabel Bassett	19,083	17.7%
Democratic	Ruth Dickinson Clement	13,666	12.6%
Democratic	Frank Naylor	13,563	12.5%
Democratic	Anna Laskey	11,906	11.0%
Democratic	Dorothy Briley	8,654	8.0%
Democratic	Ella Bilbo	7,488	6.9%
Democratic	Czarina Conlan	7,426	6.8%
Democratic	Roxanna R. Oxford	4,296	3.9%
Turnout		107812	
