= Kate Himrod Biggers =

American suffragist

- Born: Kate Himrod; July 15, 1849; Waterford, Pennsylvania
- Died: September 27, 1935 (aged 86); Waterford, Pennsylvania
- Occupations: Politician, Suffragist
- Spouse: Thomas B. Biggers (m. 1874)

Kate Himrod Biggers (1849–1935) was an American suffragist. She served as president of the Oklahoma Woman's Suffrage Association.

== Life ==
Biggers née Himrod was born on July 15, 1849, in Waterford, Pennsylvania. She married Thomas B. Biggers in 1874 and the couple moved west, living in Painterhood, Kansas, then the Chickasha, Indian Territory, finally settling in Marlow, Oklahoma, in 1910.

Biggers joined the local suffrage association in Chickasha. In 1904 the Woman's Christian Temperance Union and the National American Woman Suffrage Association (NAWSA) helped form the Woman Suffrage Association of Oklahoma and Indian Territory. Biggers served as the group's first president from 1904 through 1911. The name was changed to the Oklahoma Woman's Suffrage Association in 1907 and was part of the NAWSA.

In 1910 Biggers ran unsuccessfully for the post of Oklahoma Commissioner of Charities and Corrections against the incumbent, Kate Barnard. In 1916 Biggers helped establish the Neighborly Home Demonstration Club of Stephens County. In 1918 she served as vice president of the Marlow Suffrage Club.

After the death of her husband, Biggers returned to Waterford, Pennsylvania where she died on August 27, 1935.

== See also ==
- List of suffragists and suffragettes
