= Thomas Scott (Oklahoma politician) =

Oklahoma Assistant Mine Inspector
- In office 1914 – June 17, 1920
- Preceded by: John O'Brien
- Succeeded by: John O'Brien

Personal details
- Born: September 17, 1860 Tranent, Scotland, United Kingdom
- Died: June 17, 1920 (aged 59) Phillips, Oklahoma, U.S.
- Citizenship: American; British
- Party: Democratic Party

Thomas Scott was an American politician who served as the elected Assistant Mine Inspector in Oklahoma from 1914 until his death during an inspection in 1920.

== Biography ==
Thomas Scott was born on September 17, 1860, in Tranent, Scotland, United Kingdom. He moved to the United States in 1883. He moved to Indian Territory in 1886, and settled in Coalgate by 1889.

Scott ran for assistant mine inspector in the 1914 Oklahoma elections. He defeated incumbent John O'Brien in the Democratic Party primary, and Republican John H. Hall and Socialist Andrew Hentz in the general election.

Scott ran for reelection in the 1918 Oklahoma elections. He defeated Wolf Isherwood in the Democratic primary, and Republican Peter Mochan in the general election.

He died on June 17, 1920, during an inspection of the Fulsom-Morris Company coal mine in Phillips, Oklahoma. He was succeeded in office by John O'Brien.
