= Otto Branstetter =

American socialist

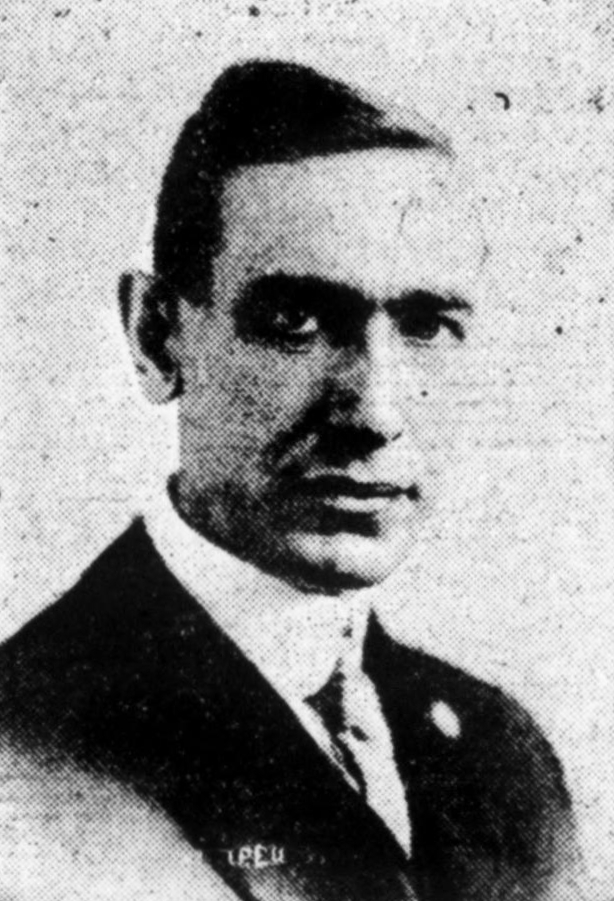
- Branstetter c. 1924

Executive Secretary of the Socialist Party of America
- In office 1919-1924
- Preceded by: Adolph Germer
- Succeeded by: Bertha Hale White

Personal details
- Born: Otto Franklin Branstetter; May 5, 1877 Kansas City, Missouri, U.S.
- Died: August 2, 1924 (aged 47) Chicago, Illinois, U.S.
- Spouse: Winnie Branstetter (m. 1899)
- Children: 2

Military service
- Branch/service: United States Army
- Years of service: 1898
- Rank: Private
- Unit: 3rd Missouri Infantry
- Battles/wars: Spanish-American War

Otto Franklin Branstetter (May 5, 1877 – August 2, 1924) was an American socialist official. Branstetter served as executive secretary of the National Executive Committee of the Socialist Party of America from 1919 until shortly before his death in 1924.

Branstetter was a private in Company G, 3rd Missouri Infantry in the Spanish–American War in 1898.

In 1921, Branstetter was a prominent founding member of the secular Jewish Yiddish-oriented political organization, the Jewish Socialist Verband. In 1921, Branstetter was a lead organizer against the communist-affiliated left wing within the Socialist Party when he introduced a resolution that called for the expulsion of SPA members who supported the Communist International (Comintern). On February 1, 1924, Branstetter submitted his resignation to the National Executive Committee, calling himself "tired and worn out." He was replaced by his assistant, Bertha Hale White.

Otto and his wife, Winnie Branstetter, married in 1899 and moved to Oklahoma in 1904. They had two children, Gertrude and Theresa. Otto's wife, Winnie, was also a socialist organizer as well as a prominent suffragette. She died in Providence, Rhode Island on November 15, 1960.
