= Sophia Julia Douglas =

- Born: Sophia Julia Coleman; September 22, 1851; Cattauragus County, New York
- Died: August 8, 1902 (aged 50); Oklahoma City, Oklahoma
- Occupations: Educator, Clubwoman
- Spouse: Selwyn Douglas (m. 1869)
- Children: 1

Sophia Julia Coleman Douglas (1851–1902) was the founder and first president of the Federation of Women's Clubs for Oklahoma and Indian Territories. She served as principal of Oklahoma City High School before statehood.

== Biography ==
Sophia Julia Coleman was born on September 22, 1851, in Cattaraugus County, New York. Her family moved to Michigan with her when she was eight years old, where she attended the state normal school. She attended Vassar College. In 1869, she married a judge, Selwyn Douglas (1841-1916), with whom she had one child, MacGregor Coleman (1873–1908). In 1891, the Colemans moved to Oklahoma City, Oklahoma. There Mrs. Douglas was the principal of the city's first high school.

Coleman was a member of several women's clubs. She joined the Philomathea Club in 1891. The Philomathea Club worked to obtain funds for a Carnegie Library in Oklahoma City. Colman wrote a letter to Andrew Carnegie in 1900 requesting a grant for the library, which he provided. In 1896, she formed the Sans Souci study club, in 1898 the Twentieth Century Club, in 1900 the New Century Club, and, in 1901, the DAYC Club (Do All You Can).

In 1898, working with the Philomathea Club, Douglas founded the Federation of Women's Clubs for Oklahoma and Indian Territories. She also served as its first president.

Douglas died on August 8, 1902, in Oklahoma City, aged 50.

== Legacy ==
A memorial fountain was erected with funds donated by the Federation of Women's Clubs for Oklahoma and Indian Territories on the grounds of the Oklahoma City Carnegie Library. It was presented November, 1903.
