= Mabel Bassett =

American politician and state official

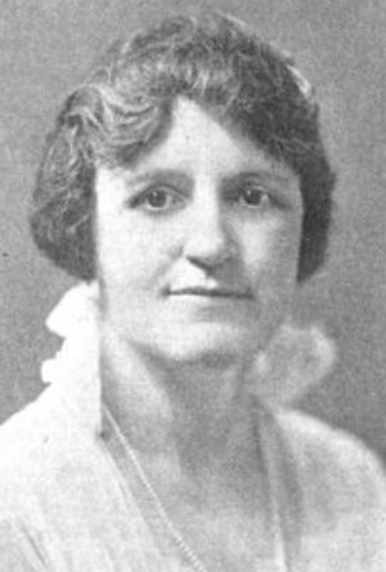
- Mabel Bassett, from a 1923 publication

3rd Oklahoma Commissioner of Charities and Corrections
- In office January 1923 – January 1947
- Preceded by: William D. Matthews
- Succeeded by: Buck Cook

Personal details
- Born: Mabel Luella Bourne; August 16, 1876 Chicago, Illinois, U.S.
- Died: August 2, 1953 (aged 76) Oklahoma City, Oklahoma, U.S.

Mabel Luella Bourne Bassett (August 16, 1876 (Note: Her gravestone gives 1875 as the birth year.) – August 2, 1953) was an American politician in Oklahoma. A Democrat, she served as the state's Commissioner of Charities and Corrections from 1923 until 1947.

== Early life ==
Mabel Bourne was born in Chicago, the daughter of Stephen Bourne and Martha E. Yourlin Bourne. She graduated from high school in Billings, Montana. She lived in Trinidad, Colorado as a young woman, and moved to Sapulpa, Oklahoma in 1902. She took courses at the Missouri School of Social Work in St. Louis.

== Career ==
Prior to seeking political office, Bassett founded the Creek County Humane Society, one of the first humane societies in Oklahoma. During World War I, she was executive secretary of the Creek County Red Cross.

Once in office as Commissioner of Charities and Corrections, Bassett was responsible for establishing a women's unit of the Oklahoma State Penitentiary and transferring African-American juvenile delinquents from the state penitentiary to a training school in Boley. In 1923, she issued a report on abusive and negligent conditions at the Pauls Valley Training School, a juvenile detention facility. "The people of Oklahoma want the truth," she said of her reform campaign. "They do not want their little boys flogged by drunken guards and I shall see that it is stopped, regardless of what is thrown in my path." In 1936, she investigated the death of an 11-year-old boy who died attempting to escape a fourth-floor jail cell in Stillwater.

Bassett also campaigned for a seat in the U.S. House of Representatives in 1932; however, she lost to fellow Democrat Will Rogers. She ran for a Congressional seat again in 1940. Buck Cook defeated Bassett for reelection to Commissioner of Charities and Corrections in the Democratic Runoff Primary in 1946. Bassett attempted to regain that office from Buck Cook in 1950 but was again defeated in the Democratic Runoff Primary. After which Bassett retired from politics. She ran a cattle farm in Guthrie, Oklahoma.

From 1930 to 1931, Bassett was vice-president of the American Prison Association.

== Personal life, death, and legacy ==
Bourne married train conductor Joseph L. Bassett in 1890, and had three children. Her daughter died in 1935. Upon Bassett's death from cancer in 1953, in Oklahoma City, her body lay in state in the Oklahoma State Capitol. Oklahoma's Mabel Bassett Correctional Center is named for Bassett.

== Electoral history ==
Oklahoma Commissioner of Charities and Corrections Democratic primary (August 4, 1914)
Party	Candidate	Votes	%
Democratic	William D. Matthews	21,720	20.1%
Democratic	Mabel Bassett	19,083	17.7%
Democratic	Ruth Dickinson Clement	13,666	12.6%
Democratic	Frank Naylor	13,563	12.5%
Democratic	Anna Laskey	11,906	11.0%
Democratic	Dorothy Briley	8,654	8.0%
Democratic	Ella Bilbo	7,488	6.9%
Democratic	Czarina Conlan	7,426	6.8%
Democratic	Roxanna R. Oxford	4,296	3.9%
Turnout		107812	
