= Frances F. Threadgill =

- Born: Frances Falwell; September 22, 1867; Memphis, Tennessee
- Died: February 17, 1941 (aged 73); Oklahoma City, Oklahoma
- Occupations: Educator, Club Woman
- Spouse: John Threadgill (m. 1892; died 1915)
- Children: 2

Frances Falwell Threadgill (1867-1941) was the first president of the Oklahoma State Federation of Women's Clubs.

== Biography ==
Threadgill née Falwell was born on September 22, 1867, in Memphis, Tennessee. She attended the Peabody Normal School in Nashville, graduating in 1881. She taught school in Memphis and then moved to Taylor, Texas, teaching there briefly until 1892. The same year she married Dr. John Threadgill, with whom she had two children.

The Threadgills moved Oklahoma. There she became involved with the Federation of Women's Clubs for Oklahoma and Indian Territories. In 1902 she led a campaign to place kindergartens in the public school system. From 1904 to 1906, serving on the Federation's legislative committee, she campaigned to include legislation regarding regulation of child labor, compulsory education, and the establishment of juvenile courts and a reform school.

In 1908 the Federation of Women's Clubs for Oklahoma and Indian Territories and the Federation of Women's Clubs of Indian Territory merged to become the Oklahoma State Federation of Women's Clubs and Threadgill served as its first president.

In 1909 the Frances F. Threadgill Education Loan Fund was established by the Oklahoma State Federation of Women's Clubs.

From 1910 to 1912 Threadgill served as the treasurer of the national organization the General Federation of Women's Clubs of which the Oklahoma State Federation of Women's Clubs was a member. She also worked to gain suffrage for Oklahoma women.

In 1934 Threadgill was inducted into the Oklahoma Hall of Fame.

Threadgill died on February 17, 1941, in Oklahoma City.
