= Summers T. Hardy =

American politician (1875–1950)

Justice of the Oklahoma Supreme Court
- In office 1914–1919
- Preceded by: W. R. Bleakmore
- Succeeded by: R. W. Higgins

Personal details
- Born: May 23, 1875 Van Buren County, Arkansas, United States
- Died: October 18, 1950 (aged 75) Tulsa, Oklahoma, United States
- Occupation: Attorney, Judge, Justice of the Oklahoma Supreme Court
- Known for: Personal lawyer for Harry Sinclair; corporate counsel for Sinclair Oil Company

Summers T. Hardy (May 23, 1875 – October 18, 1950) was a native of Arkansas who came to Indian Territory in with his family in 1892, settling in what would become Ardmore, Oklahoma. (Note: Hardy's formal education ended after the eighth grade, when he began working as a postal clerk.) He read law and passed the bar exam in 1897, then entered private law practice in Ardmore and Madill, Oklahoma. Hardy met a young woman from Texas in Ardmore named Laura Scribner, whom he married in 1900. He got into local politics and was elected as a delegate to the Oklahoma Constitutional Convention in 1906. He was named President of the Madill City School board in 1907–1908. He ran for a District 16 judgeship in Marshall County and won, serving 1911–1913, then served briefly in District 29 in 1914.

== Early life ==
Summers T. Hardy was born in Van Buren County, Arkansas on May 23, 1875, to Henry and Martha (Underwood) Hardy. As a young man, Henry was a farmer and blacksmith, and became a local Methodist preacher as he grew older. He was also elected to the state legislature as a Democratic representative until 1885. Then, Henry moved his family to Montague County, Texas, where he was elected twice as county judge, for a total of four years. After his term ended, he moved to Ardmore (then in Oklahoma Territory, where Henry died in 1895 at age 43.

Young Hardy grew up on farms, was educated in public schools and had some commercial training. He was then hired as a clerk in the local post office, while completing a course in stenography. He used this training to get hired by the local Garrett and Hardy law firm, while he also read the law and passed the bar exam in 1897. (Note: The partner in the law firm was apparently one of Henry's brothers, Reuben, who had come to settle in Oklahoma Territory before Henry.)

== Legal career in Oklahoma ==
In 1900, Summers Hardy and his brother Garret formed a partnership with Mr. Garrett in Madill, Oklahoma. Hardy became particularly interested in "citizenship cases." One such, Archards v. McGahey, et al., No. 1,. (Note: Also called, "the government farm case," was fought for years before the Five Tribes Commission and the U. S. Court and was settled in Washington D. C.) The decision was considered a notable win for the Hardy firm.

Politically, Hardy identifies himself as a strong democrat and a prohibitionist. In 1906, the Oklahoma Democratic Party selected him as one of its speakers trying to convince voters in Oklahoma Territory that they should support the proposed Oklahoma Constitution.

== Oklahoma Supreme Court ==
At age 29, in 1914, Hardy was elected to a 6-year term (1915–21) as an associate justice of the Oklahoma Supreme Court, making him one of the youngest men ever to serve on the highest court in the state. He was named Chief Justice for 1917–18.

After serving on the State Supreme Court, Summers resigned from public service on May 1, 1919, and moved to Tulsa, where he became General Counsel for Harry Sinclair and the Sinclair Oil Companies. He and his wife bought a lot in the very fashionable Maple Ridge Historic District subdivision, where they had an architect build a two-story Prairie Style residence at 1702 South Madison Avenue. The house still stands today, serving as an elegant private residence. (Note: At the time of its construction in 1918, the house and lot reportedly cost $2,300.)

== Involvement with Harry Sinclair ==
Harry Sinclair became a major donor to the national Republican Party, whose standard-bearer, Warren G. Harding, won the 1920 Presidential election. During Harding's first term, the infamous Teapot Dome Scandal erupted, engulfing much of the Harding administration and many major supporters in charges of official corruption regarding sale of oil leases. It is unclear when the retired Justice Summers left the Sinclair organization (though he was not accused of any wrongdoing), but the scandal ruined Sinclair and caused his oil empire to be completely dismantled and sold piecemeal to other companies.

== Tulsa University College of Law activities ==
Judge Hardy was instrumental in founding Tulsa Law School in 1923. After Tulsa Law School merged with the University of Tulsa to become the University of Tulsa College of Law in 1943, Judge Hardy served as the first dean of the merged law school from 1943 to 1949. The Hardys continued to live in the Maplewood house during that time.

== Death ==
Hardy died at his home in Tulsa, Oklahoma after suffering a stroke.
