= Annette Ross Hume =

American photographer (1858–1933)

- Born: Annette Ross; March 8, 1858; Perrysburg, Ohio
- Died: January 19, 1933 (aged 74); Minco, Oklahoma
- Occupations: Photographer, woman's club president
- Known for: taking over 700 of the earliest photographs of Oklahoma Territory
- Notable work: An Historical Sketch of the Federation of Women's Clubs of Oklahoma and Indian Territories, 1898–1908

Annette Ross Hume (March 8, 1858 – January 19, 1933) was an American photographer known for taking over 700 photographs of Native Americans and Oklahoma Territory. She served as the president of the Oklahoma State Federation of Women's Clubs from 1913 to 1915.

== Early life and family ==
Annette Ross Hume was born on March 8, 1858, to James and Catherine Darling Ross in Perrysburg, Ohio. She married Charles R. Hume, a doctor, on December 12, 1876. In 1890, they moved to Anadarko, Oklahoma Territory. Charles worked as a physician for the Kiowa, Comanche, and Wichita tribes. She had five children, two of which survived to adulthood: Carleton Ross and Raymond Robinson.

== Photography ==
Starting 1891, Hume took up photography. She photographed Native Americans, including Geronimo and Quanah Parker, and Oklahoma Territory. In total, her work includes over 700 photographs that depict the transition of the area from Indian reservations to Oklahoma Territory. Her glass photographic plate negatives are now part of the University of Oklahoma's archives. Other photos are part of the Oklahoma Historical Society and Wichita State University's archives.

== Activism ==
Hume was a charter member of the Anadarko Philomathic Club in 1899. She wrote An Historical Sketch of the Federation of Women's Clubs of Oklahoma and Indian Territories, 1898–1908 in 1908 and served as the president of the Oklahoma State Federation of Women's Clubs from 1913 to 1915. She was president of the Presbyterian Women's Territorial Synodical Society before her death on January 19, 1933, in Minco, Oklahoma.
