= John Threadgill =

American politician and physician (1847–1915)

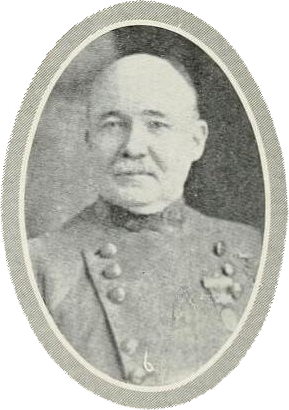
- Threadgill in a 1914 publication

Member of the Oklahoma Territorial Council for the 4th district
- In office 1905–1907
- Preceded by: R. M. Campbell
- Succeeded by: Position disestablished

Member of the Oklahoma Territorial House for the 7th district
- In office 1903–1905
- Preceded by: John Embry
- Succeeded by: R. R. Fuller

Personal details
- Born: September 28, 1847 Wadesboro, North Carolina, U.S.
- Died: May 14, 1915 (aged 67) Oklahoma City, Oklahoma, U.S.
- Resting place: Fairlawn Cemetery; Oklahoma City, Oklahoma, U.S.
- Party: Democratic; Republican
- Spouse(s): Elizabeth Guiton (m. 1872; died 1873) Susannah Gault (m. 1875; died 1891) Frances Falwell (m. 1892)
- Children: 4
- Education: College of Physicians and Surgeons; Alabama Medical College (MD)
- Occupation: Politician; physician; banker; soldier

John Threadgill (September 28, 1847 – May 14, 1915) was an American politician, physician and banker. Born in North Carolina, he served in the Confederate States Army and practiced medicine in Texas and the Oklahoma Territory. He was mayor of Taylor, Texas, and served in the Oklahoma Territorial Legislature. He was a leader in the United Confederate Veterans.

== Early life ==
John Threadgill was born on September 28, 1847, in Wadesboro, North Carolina, to Elizabeth (née Paul) and James Threadgill. He grew up and attended local schools in Anson County. His great uncle Thomas Threadgill was a member of the constitutional convention of North Carolina.

== Civil War ==
At the age of 16, Threadgill joined the Company C of the 14th North Carolina Infantry Regiment of the Confederate States Army as a private. He was a member of the flying squadron and was part of the Shenandoah Valley raid. He was part of General Jubal Early's division in the fall of 1864. On October 19, 1864, he was wounded in the Battle of Cedar Creek and following the valley campaign became a prisoner of war during the Siege of Petersburg. He also participated in the battles of Winchester and Strasburg. He was a prisoner of war at Hart Island and was held there until June 29, 1865.

== Medical studies and career ==
Following the war, Threadgill returned home and studied medicine for two years in the offices of Dr. Edmond F. Ashe. He then attended the Washington University (later the College of Physicians and Surgeons) in Baltimore. After completing his studies, he moved to Brenham, Texas, in September 1870 and practiced medicine there. He then attended the Alabama Medical College and graduated with a Doctor of Medicine in 1873. He returned to Taylor, Texas, to practice medicine.

== Politics and later career ==
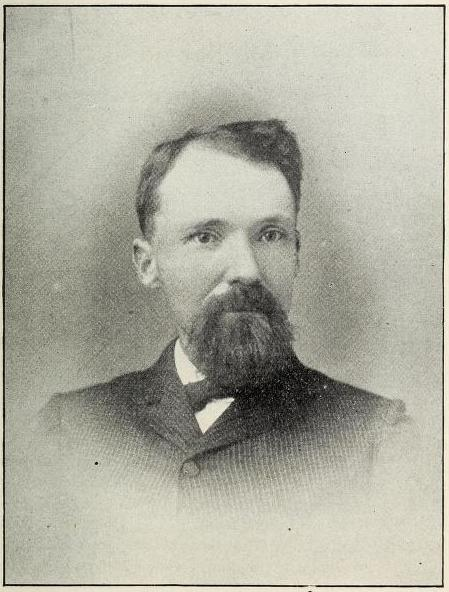
Threadgill in a 1890 publication

Threadgill was a Republican and Democrat. He was county commissioner of Williamson County and served as city alderman for two terms. He served four years as mayor of Taylor. He conducted financial ventures there and was president of the First National Bank of Taylor. In 1893, he moved to Norman in the Oklahoma Territory and took up a position caring for the mentally ill. He established a sanatorium in Norman and remained there until 1901, when he moved to Oklahoma City.

After moving to Oklahoma City, he stopped practicing medicine. In 1902, he was elected president of the newly organized Oklahoma Medical College. In 1903 and 1904, he served in the Oklahoma Territorial Legislature. He successfully passed legislation to make it a felony to bribe a state official. In 1905, he was appointed by Governor Frank Frantz as a member of the board of education and served two terms. One term, he served as president of the body and also served as its secretary. He was later appointed to the board of the insane asylum at Fort Supply and also served as its chairman.

On April 3, 1904, Threadgill opened and operated Threadgill Hotel (later Bristol Hotel) in Oklahoma City. In 1904, he was an organizer of the Commercial National Bank and served as the president until 1905 when he sold his interest. He also served as president of the Oklahoma Bank and Trust Company, which he organized in 1902. He was director of the State National Bank. He organized the Oklahoma National Life Insurance Company in 1910 and served as president for eighteen months. In 1903, he was elected president of the Oklahoma City school board. He was appointed a member of the pension board of Confederate veterans and at the time of his death was brigadier general of the first brigade of the United Confederate Veterans. Following a Confederate reunion in Macon, Georgia, Threadgill returned a minority report of the United Confederate Veterans and accepted the invitation of the Grand Army of the Republic to participate in the 1913 Gettysburg reunion.

== Personal life ==
Threadgill married Elizabeth Guiton on January 28, 1872. She died in 1873. Threadgill married Susannah "Sue" Gault of Taylor, Texas, on December 1, 1875. They had two children, James S. and Jennie. Susannah died in 1891. He married Frances Falwell of Memphis, Tennessee, on January 6, 1892. They had two children, Mary Frances and John Falwell.

Threadgill died on May 14, 1915, at his home on Robinson Avenue in Oklahoma City. He was buried at Fairlawn Cemetery in Oklahoma City.
