= Federation of Women's Clubs for Oklahoma and Indian Territories =

- Successor: Oklahoma State Federation of Women's Clubs
- Formation: 1898
- Founder: Sophia Julia Coleman Douglas
- Founded at: Oklahoma
- Type: Woman's club

The Federation of Women's Clubs for Oklahoma and Indian Territories was formed in May, 1898. The motto selected for the organization was "Kindliness and Helpfulness". The first president was Sophia Julia Coleman Douglas.

The charter women's clubs were:

- Philomathea Club, Oklahoma City, organized Oct. 1891
- Chautauqua Literary and Scientific Club, Guthrie, organized Oct. 1891
- Coterle Club, Norman, organized Jan. 1894
- Tuesday Afternoon, Perry, organized Sept. 1894
- Merrie Wives, Purcell, organized Feb. 1895
- Current Events, Kingfisher, organized Oct. 1895
- Matrons' Magazine, Wynnewood, organized Feb. 1896
- San Souci, Oklahoma City, organized Oct. 1896
- Browning, Stillwater, Organized Nov. 1896
- Athenaeum Club, El Reno, organized 1897
- Shakespeare Club, Guthrie, organized May, 1898

They immediately joined the General Federation of Women's Clubs (GFWC). Working under the auspices of the GFWC, the Federation of Women's Clubs for Oklahoma and Indian Territories supported the 1906 campaign for a compulsory school attendance law, which help achieve the resulting compulsory education bill that passed in 1907. They were also involved with the GFWC's "Indian Welfare Committee", working for better health care and educational facilities for Native Americans.

Beginning in 1903, some women's clubs left the Federation of Women's Clubs for Oklahoma and Indian Territories to form the Federation of Women's Clubs of Indian Territory. Membership in the Indian Territories women's clubs typically had a majority Native American membership.

== Oklahoma State Federation of Women's Clubs ==
Oklahoma achieved statehood in 1907. In 1908 the Federation of Women's Clubs for Oklahoma and Indian Territories and the Federation of Women's Clubs of Indian Territory merged to become the Oklahoma State Federation of Women's Clubs. The first president was Frances F. Threadgill. In 1909 the newly merged club was admitted into the GFWC.
