= Oklahoma Commissioner of Charities and Corrections =

The Oklahoma commissioner of charities and corrections was an elective executive officer of the state of Oklahoma.

The office was established by the Oklahoma Constitution in 1907. The commissioner was required to make an annual report; the first report was dated December 10, 1908. The office was disestablished by the constitutional amendment State Question 50 to the Constitution. It was adopted at the special election held on July 22, 1975. The amendment came into effect on January 8, 1979. The duties of the commissioner were taken over by the Oklahoma Department of Corrections.

== Qualifications and term of office ==
A commissioner of charities and corrections had to have been a citizen of the United States, at least 25 years old, and have been resident of Oklahoma for at least ten years prior to election and served a four-year term that ran concurrent with that of the governor of Oklahoma.

== Powers and responsibilities ==
The commissioner of charities and corrections had the power to investigate the entire system of public charities and corrections of the state. This included examining the conditions and management of all prisons, jails, alms-houses, reformatories, reform and industrial schools, hospitals, infirmaries, dispensaries, orphanages, and all public and private retreats and asylums which derived their support wholly or in part from the State, any county or municipality within the State.

In performing those duties, the officers of the institutions being investigated by the commissioner of charities and corrections had to promptly furnish the commissioner of charities and corrections with such information, relating to their respective institutions at the demand of the commissioner of charities and corrections. Also, the commissioner of charities and corrections had the power to summon any person to appear and produce such books and papers as was designated in the summons, and to give testimony under oath concerning the matter and institution under investigation.

A full report of any investigation, including the testimony, conducted by the commissioner of charities and corrections had to be made to the governor of Oklahoma and then had to be transmitted by the governor to the Oklahoma Legislature with any suggestions as the governor desired to make. Also, on the first day of October of each year, and at any time on request of the governor, the commissioner of charities and corrections had to make a full and complete report of the operations and administration of their office, with such suggestions as the commissioner of charities and corrections may have deemed suitable and pertinent.

== Commissioners ==
1. Kate Barnard, 1907 - 1915, first woman to hold state office in Oklahoma.
2. William D. Matthews, 1915 - 1923
3. Mabel Bassett, 1923 - 1947
4. Buck Cook, 1947 - 1967
5. Jim Cook, 1967 - 1977
6. Jack Stamper, 1977 - 1979
