= F. E. Riddle =

American lawyer

- Born: July 13, 1870; Lynchburg, Moore County, Tennessee
- Other name: Finis E. Riddle
- Occupations: Attorney, judge
- Years active: Associate Justice of the Oklahoma Supreme Court; Chief Justice of the Oklahoma Supreme Court in 1914
- Notable work: Served as chief counsel for Gov. Jack C. Walton and Lt. Gov. Martin Trapp in their impeachment trials.

Finis E. Riddle (born 1870), known better as F. E. Riddle, was a frontier lawyer and Oklahoma Supreme Court Justice.

== Early life ==
Riddle was born in Lynchburg, Tennessee, in Moore County, to Martin Van Buren and Theresa (née Tucker) Riddle, and raised in Tennessee until he enrolled in school at National Normal University in Lebanon, Ohio. (Note: The source identified the school as "Holbrook's Normal", but it was actually named Southwestern Normal School when it opened in 1855. It was renamed National Normal University (NNU) in 1870. Alfred Holbrook was the school president from its founding until he resigned in 1894. It became Lebanon University in 1907, and closed in 1917 after going bankrupt. The facility was demolished in 1977.) It is unclear whether Riddle graduated from NNU, but evidently the school did not have a curriculum in law. Later, Riddle studied law under Judge Samuel A. Billingsley, and was admitted to the Tennessee bar in 1894.

== Career ==
Riddle decided his future would be made in the West, and moved to that part of Indian Territory containing the town now known as Chickasha, Oklahoma. He established a private practice of lawyers that was retained on most of the important legal cases that appeared before the territorial courts before the state of Oklahoma was organized. In 1904, Riddle became eligible to present cases before the United States Supreme Court.

In April 1914, Riddle was appointed to the Oklahoma Supreme Court by Governor Lee Cruce to complete the unexpired term of the recently deceased Chief Justice Samuel W. Hayes, whose term was scheduled to expire in January 1915. He accepted, even though he continued to live in Chickasha while he served. During the eight months following his appointment, he reportedly wrote eighty opinions, a number never exceeded by an Oklahoma justice in such a short time. Riddle served as chief counsel in the impeachment trial of Governor Jack C. Walton and chief counsel for Lt. Governor Martin E. Trapp in a suit to determine whether Trapp could succeed himself after replacing Walton. Riddle's effort was successful.

The Riddles moved to Tulsa after he resigned from the Supreme Court in 1919. He spent the rest of his career as the junior partner of Linn & Riddle.

== Personal life ==
Riddle married Letitia Cloud, the daughter of a rancher who lived in Gainesville, Texas, in 1896. They had one child, daughter Frances Alee Riddle, who was born in 1900. (Note: Harlow's biography of Riddle gives Letitia's surname as Claud and Frances' middle name as Allie.) Frances was noted for her equestrian skills and won a blue ribbon at the Oklahoma State Fair in 1914.
