= Frank M. Boyer =

American politician

Member of the Oklahoma House of Representatives from the Tulsa County district
- In office 1932–1934 Serving with Krit Logsdon, (Note: The Tulsa County district was a top-seven district during the 14th Oklahoma Legislature.) Joe Chambers, Henry C. Timmons, Mat X. Beard, Ben O. Kirkpatrick, and Seth G. Eby Jr.
- Preceded by: Robert Galbreath (Note: The Tulsa County district was a top-five district during the 13th Oklahoma Legislature. Candidates who served in both the 13th and 14th Oklahoma Legislatures are listed under "alongside.")
- Succeeded by: A. E. Montgomery (Note: The Tulsa County district was a top-seven district during the 15th Oklahoma Legislature. Candidates who served in both the 14th and 15th Oklahoma Legislatures will be listed under "alongside."); Ed B. Moffett; Lewis Poe; G. R. Kirkpatrick; Edwin P. O'Brien
- In office 1922–1926 Serving with W. Warren Ferrell (1922–1924), (Note: Boyer served in both the 9th and 10th Oklahoma Legislature representing a top-five electoral district.) J. W. Simpson (1922–1924), John H. Miller (1922–1926), George S. Long (1922–1924), Phillip J. Kramer (1924–1926), Thomas I. Munroe (1924–1926), and O. H. Terwilleger (1924–1926)
- Preceded by: Bailey E. Bell (Note: The Tulsa County district was a top-two district during the 8th Oklahoma Legislature.); Remington Rogers
- Succeeded by: L. O. Maxwell (Note: The Tulsa County district was a top-five district during the 11th Oklahoma Legislature.); O. O. Owens; G. C. Thomas; D. A. Wilson; Hugh Webster

Personal details
- Born: 1889 or 1890 Toledo, Ohio, U.S.
- Died: June 16, 1967 Oklahoma City, Oklahoma, U.S.
- Party: Democratic Party

Frank M. Boyer was an American politician who served in the Oklahoma House of Representatives from 1922 to 1926, and from 1932 to 1934. He represented Tulsa County as a member of the Democratic Party. Alongside John H. Miller, he was the first representative from Tulsa County to win reelection to the Oklahoma House.

== Biography ==
Frank M. Boyer was born in 1889 or 1890 in Toledo, Ohio. He moved to Tulsa in 1914

Boyer served in the Oklahoma House of Representatives representing Tulsa County as a member of the Democratic Party from 1922 to 1926. He was preceded in office by Bailey E. Bell and Remington Rogers, and succeeded in office by L. O. Maxwell, O. O. Owens, G. C. Thomas, D. A. Wilson, and Hugh Webster. Boyer was a member of the Ku Klux Klan and chaired the legislative probe into Governor Jack C. Walton's efforts to prevent a 1923 special election.

Boyer was later reelected to a third term in 1932, where he was preceded in office by Robert Galbreath, and was succeeded in office by A. E. Montgomery, Ed. B. Moffett, Lewis Poe, Seth G. Eby Jr., and Edwin P. O'Brien. After leaving office in 1934, he remained in Oklahoma City, where he worked as a deputy county treasurer. He died on June 16, 1967, in Oklahoma City.
