= Harry H. Rogers =

American politician

Member of the Oklahoma House of Representatives from the Tulsa district
- In office November 1916 – November 1918 Serving with Glenn Condon (Note: The Tulsa County district was a top-two district during the 6th Oklahoma Legislature.)
- Preceded by: James H. Sykes (Note: The Tulsa County district was a top-two district during the 5th Oklahoma Legislature.); Washington E. Hudson
- Succeeded by: W. Valjean Biddison (Note: The Tulsa County district was a top-two district during the 7th Oklahoma Legislature.); Joe W. Kenton

Personal details
- Born: 1877 Hickory County, Missouri, U.S.
- Died: December 3, 1957 San Antonio, Texas, U.S.
- Party: Republican

Harry H. Rogers was an American politician, oilman, and banker who served in the Oklahoma House of Representatives. He represented Tulsa County as a Republican.

== Biography ==
Harry H. Rogers was born in Hickory County, Missouri in 1877. He worked as a teacher in Hickory and St. Clair counties before becoming licensed to practice law. He later moved to Wewoka and Holdenville, both in Oklahoma, before settling in Tulsa in 1912. He worked as an oilman, lawyer, and banker. Prior to Oklahoma statehood, he opposed the State of Sequoyah.

In 1916, he ran for the Oklahoma House of Representatives in the Republican primary, winning the nomination for the top two Tulsa County district alongside Glenn Condon. Rogers and Condon defeated Democratic nominees James H. Sykes and Kelley E. Gibson in the general election. Socialist candidates R. S. Lyon and J. A. Mooney also ran placing fifth and sixth.

In 1918, he was supported by the Republican State Convention as the party's gubernatorial nominee, but he withdrew from the race a month later. He was described as an "oil millionaire" in his 1918 campaign withdrawal announcement. He moved to San Antonio, Texas, in 1920. He died on December 3, 1957, in San Antonio "after several weeks' illness."
