= Joe W. Kenton =

Oklahoma state representative

Member of the Oklahoma House of Representatives from the Tulsa County district
- In office 1918–1920 Serving with W. Valjean Biddison (Note: The Tulsa County district was a top-two district during the 7th Oklahoma Legislature.)
- Preceded by: Glenn Condon (Note: The Tulsa County district was a top-two district during the 6th Oklahoma Legislature.); Harry H. Rogers
- Succeeded by: Bailey E. Bell (Note: The Tulsa County district was a top-two district during the 8th Oklahoma Legislature.); Remington Rogers

Personal details
- Party: Democratic Party

Joe W. Kenton was an American politician who served in the Oklahoma House of Representatives from 1918 to 1920. He represented Tulsa County as a member of the Democratic Party.

== Biography ==
Joe W. Kenton filed to run as a Democrat in the 1918 Oklahoma House of Representatives election. He placed first in the top-two primary, ahead of third place candidate C. E. King who was eliminated and advanced to the general election alongside W. Valjean Biddison. Biddison and Kenton defeated Republican nominees J. J. DeShane and Horace J. Newberry in the November election. Kenton was preceded in office by Glenn Condon and Harry H. Rogers, and succeeded in office by Bailey E. Bell and Remington Rogers.
