= George S. Long =

American politician (1883–1958)

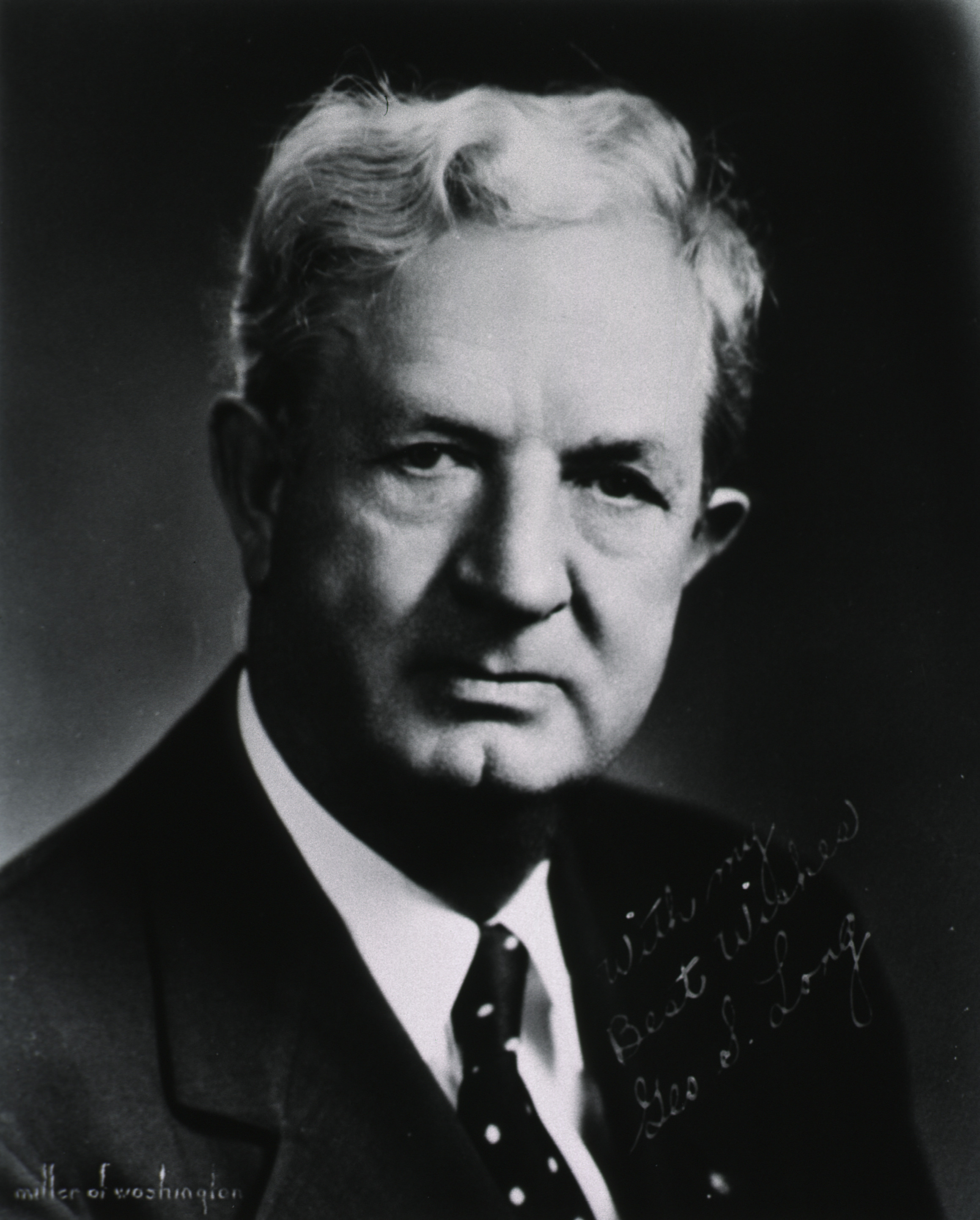

Member of the U.S. House of Representatives from Louisiana's 8th district
- In office January 3, 1953 – March 22, 1958
- Preceded by: A. Leonard Allen
- Succeeded by: Harold McSween

Member of the Oklahoma House of Representatives from the Tulsa County district
- In office 1923–1925 Serving with J. W. Simpson (Note: The Tulsa County district was a top-five district during the 9th Oklahoma Legislature.), W. Warren Ferrell, Frank M. Boyer, and John H. Miller
- Preceded by: Bailey E. Bell (Note: The Tulsa County district was a top-two district during the 8th Oklahoma Legislature.); Remington Rogers
- Succeeded by: John H. Miller (Note: The Tulsa County district was a top-five district during the 10th Oklahoma Legislature.); Phillip J. Kramer; Thomas I. Moore; Frank M. Boyer; O. H. Terwilleger

Personal details
- Born: George Shannon Long; September 11, 1883 Tunica, Louisiana, U.S.
- Died: March 22, 1958 (aged 74) Bethesda, Maryland, U.S.
- Resting place: Greenwood Memorial Park in Pineville, Louisiana
- Party: Democratic
- Spouse(s): Mary Katherine Shindel Long (–1950; her death); Jewell Irene Tyson Long (married 1953–1958; his death)
- Relatives: Long family
- Education: Louisiana College
- Occupation: Educator, lawyer, dentist

Military service
- Allegiance: United States
- Branch/service: United States Army

George Shannon Long (September 11, 1883 – March 22, 1958) was a member of the United States House of Representatives from Louisiana. He was also a member of the Long family.

Long was born in Tunica, Louisiana, on September 11, 1883. He was the second son of Huey Pierce Long Sr. (1852–1937) and Caledonia Palestine Tison (1860–1913). After dental school, he moved to Tulsa, Oklahoma and served in the state house during the 9th Oklahoma Legislature.

During the 1920s in Oklahoma Long was a member of the Ku Klux Klan.

== See also ==
- List of members of the United States Congress who died in office (1950–1999)

== Notes ==
U.S. House of Representatives
Preceded by A. Leonard Allen	United States Representative for the 8th Congressional District of Louisiana; 1953–1958	Succeeded by Harold B. McSween
