= W. V. Pryor =

American politician

Member of the Oklahoma House of Representatives from the Creek and Tulsa counties district
- In office 1910–1912
- Preceded by: John H. Simmons
- Succeeded by: William B. Williams (Note: The joint Creek and Tulsa County floterial district was replaced with a top-two Tulsa County district after the 3rd Oklahoma Legislature.); Frank Z. Curry

Personal details
- Born: 1887 North Carolina, U.S.
- Died: October 22, 1950 Claremore, Oklahoma, U.S.
- Resting place: Hendersonville, North Carolina, U.S.
- Party: Democratic Party
- Education: University of North Carolina

W. V. Pryor (1887 – October 22, 1950) was an American politician who served in the Oklahoma House of Representatives from 1910 to 1912.

== Biography ==
W. V. Pryor was born in 1887 in North Carolina and graduated from the University of North Carolina in 1905.

In 1910, he was the Democratic Party nominee for the Creek and Tulsa counties district in the Oklahoma House of Representatives. He defeated Republican Joseph Bruner in the general election. He served in the 3rd Oklahoma Legislature, was preceded in office by Republican John H. Simmons, and succeeded in office by Democrats William B. Williams and Frank Z. Curry.

He was unopposed in the Democratic Primary for reelection, but lost the general election to Republican newspaper editor H. H. Sherman. Socialist Party candidate Frank Voorhees also ran in the general election, placing third behind Pryor.

In 1914, Pryor ran for Creek County attorney and faced S. H. Sornborger in the Democratic primary. He won the primary and faced Roy T. Wildman, John W. Overstreet and Oran Burk in the general election. Wildman won the office.

In 1917, Pryor was appointed to the Oklahoma Supreme Court Commission by Governor Robert L. Williams.

In 1930, Pryor was charged with contempt of court by Judge Thomas S. Harris after Pryor made comments about a case Harris disliked. The Oklahoma Court of Criminal Appeals ordered the charges against Pryor be dismissed on appeal. In 1940, Pryor was charged with first degree manslaughter after he killed Claude Bellows with his car. The charges were later dismissed by District Judge D. O. Beaver on the request of county attorney Everett S. Collins.

Pryor died on October 22, 1950, in Claremore, Oklahoma. He was buried in Hendersonville, North Carolina. (Note: While the headline indicates Pryor was buried in Claremore, the text of the article clarified he was buried in Hendersonville.)
