= Bailey E. Bell =

American politician (1891–1971)

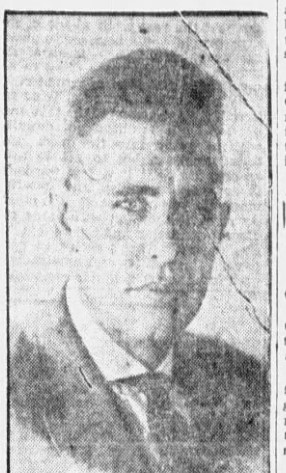
- Bell in 1920

Member of the Oklahoma House of Representatives from the Tulsa County district
- In office November 1920 – November 1922 Serving with Remington Rogers (Note: The Tulsa County district was a top-two district during the 8th Oklahoma Legislature.)
- Preceded by: Joe W. Kenton (Note: The Tulsa County district was a top-two district during the 7th Oklahoma Legislature.); W. Valjean Biddison
- Succeeded by: J. W. Simpson (Note: The Tulsa County district was a top-five district during the 9th Oklahoma Legislature.); W. Warren Ferrell; Frank M. Boyer; John H. Miller; George S. Long

Personal details
- Born: December 31, 1891 Osceola, Missouri, U.S.
- Died: June 21, 1971 (aged 79) Seattle, Washington, U.S.
- Party: Republican

Bailey E. Bell was an American politician who served in the Oklahoma House of Representatives from 1920 to 1922. He represented Tulsa County as a member of the Republican Party.

== Biography ==
Bailey E. Bell was born on December 31, 1891, in Osceola, Missouri, and moved to Oklahoma Territory when he was three. He served as the assistant city attorney for Tulsa from 1916 to 1917. In 1916, he was the Republican nominee for Tulsa County court clerk, but lost the election to Democrat Frank Ingraham.

He ran for the Oklahoma House of Representatives in 1920 as a member of the Republican Party and faced H. J. Newberry, Remington Rogers, and J. E. Hildt in the primary election. He advanced to the general election alongside Rogers and faced Democrats E. Bee Guthrey and N. R. Graham. Bell placed second in the top-two election, winning a seat alongside Rogers.

Bell served in the Oklahoma House of Representatives as a member of the Republican Party representing the Tulsa County district from 1920 to 1922 alongside Remington Rogers. He was preceded in office by Joe W. Kenton and W. Valjean Biddison, and succeeded in office by J. W. Simpson, W. Warren Ferrell, Frank M. Boyer, John H. Miller, and George S. Long. Bell was the speaker pro tem of the Oklahoma House during the 8th Oklahoma Legislature.

He was a Republican candidate for the U.S. House of Representatives in 1932 and 1936.

He moved to Alaska in 1940 and worked as an attorney in the Fairbanks and Anchorage. In 1965, he returned to Tulsa, before moving to Marysville, Washington, in 1970. He died on June 22, 1971, in Seattle, Washington, of a stroke.
