= Glenn Condon =

American politician (1891 - 1968)

Member of the Oklahoma House of Representatives from the Tulsa County district
- In office 1916–1918 Serving with Harry H. Rogers (Note: The Tulsa County district was a top-two district during the 6th Oklahoma Legislature.)
- Preceded by: James H. Sykes (Note: The Tulsa County district was a top-two district during the 5th Oklahoma Legislature.); Washington E. Hudson
- Succeeded by: W. Valjean Biddison (Note: The Tulsa County district was a top-two district during the 7th Oklahoma Legislature.); Joe W. Kenton

Personal details
- Born: 1891 Iowa, United States
- Died: August 24, 1968 (aged 76) Tulsa, Oklahoma, United States
- Party: Republican Party (after 1916); Socialist (1912)

Glenn Condon was an American politician and newspaper editor who served in the Oklahoma House of Representatives representing Tulsa County from 1916 to 1918.

== Biography ==
Glen Condon was born in Iowa in 1891 and moved to Oklahoma City in his youth.

In 1912, Condon ran for clerk of the Tulsa County Superior Court as the Socialist Party of Oklahoma's nominee. He lost the general election to Democratic nominee Frank Ingraham, who received 2,972 votes while Condon received 520.

Condon served in the Oklahoma House of Representatives from 1916 to 1918 as a member of the Republican Party representing the Tulsa County district alongside fellow Republican Harry H. Rogers. He was preceded in office by James H. Sykes and Washington E. Hudson, and succeeded in office by W. Valjean Biddison and Joe W. Kenton. At the time of his election he was the youngest member of the Oklahoma House.

In March 1917, he was named managing editor of the Tulsa World. In August, he was appointed to the Tulsa Council of Defense. He was vehemently anti-Industrial Workers of the World and observed the Tulsa Outrage, writing the Tulsa World' s coverage. He left the paper in December 1917. He later became a radio host known as "Mr. Oklahoma News," hosted a radio dance party on KVOO and was the news director for KRMG.

He died on August 24, 1968, in Tulsa, Oklahoma.
