= Remington Rogers =

American politician (1893–1987)

Member of the Oklahoma House of Representatives from the Tulsa County district
- In office November 1920 – November 1922 Serving with Bailey E. Bell (Note: The Tulsa County district was a top-two district during the 8th Oklahoma Legislature.)
- Preceded by: Joe W. Kenton (Note: The Tulsa County district was a top-two district during the 7th Oklahoma Legislature.); W. Valjean Biddison
- Succeeded by: J. W. Simpson (Note: The Tulsa County district was a top-five district during the 9th Oklahoma Legislature.); W. Warren Ferrell; Frank M. Boyer; John H. Miller; George S. Long

Personal details
- Born: August 14, 1893 Brooklyn, New York, U.S.
- Died: February 10, 1987 (aged 93) Tulsa, Oklahoma, U.S.
- Party: Republican
- Education: Cornell University

Remington Rogers was an American politician who served in the Oklahoma House of Representatives representing the Tulsa County district from 1920 to 1922.

== Biography ==
Remington Rogers was born on August 14, 1893, in Brooklyn, New York, to Asa Leroy Rogers and Emily Fletcher. He graduated from Erasmus Hall High School and Cornell University in 1914. He moved to Oklahoma in 1915 joined the Oklahoma Bar Association. On June 12, 1917, he married Agnes McLeod and the couple had four children.

Rogers served in the Oklahoma House of Representatives as a member of the Republican Party representing the Tulsa County district from 1920 to 1922 alongside Bailey E. Bell. He was preceded in office by Joe W. Kenton and W. Valjean Biddison, and succeeded in office by J. W. Simpson, W. Warren Ferrell, Frank M. Boyer, John H. Miller, and George S. Long.

He taught at the University of Tulsa College of Law from 1936 to 1958. He died on February 10, 1987, in Tulsa, Oklahoma.
