= W. Valjean Biddison =

American politician and judge

District Judge for Tulsa County
- In office May 9, 1921 – January 9, 1923
- Preceded by: Position established

Member of the Oklahoma House of Representatives from the Tulsa County district
- In office 1918–1920 Serving with Joe W. Kenton (Note: The Tulsa County district was a top-two district during the 7th Oklahoma Legislature.)
- Preceded by: Glenn Condon (Note: The Tulsa County district was a top-two district during the 6th Oklahoma Legislature.); Harry H. Rogers
- Succeeded by: Bailey E. Bell (Note: The Tulsa County district was a top-two district during the 8th Oklahoma Legislature.); Remington Rogers

Personal details
- Born: Worthy Valjean Biddison; 1886 or 1887 Leonardville, Kansas, U.S.
- Died: February 8, 1963 Tulsa, Oklahoma, U.S.
- Party: Democratic Party
- Education: Kansas State Agriculture College; Washburn College

Worthy Valjean Biddison was an American politician and judge who served in the Oklahoma House of Representatives from 1918 to 1920. He was a member of the Democratic Party and represented Tulsa County.

== Biography ==
Worthy Valjean Biddison was born in Leonardville, Kansas, in 1886 or 1887. He was the son of V. H. Biddison. He was a graduate of Kansas State Agriculture College and Washburn College. He moved to Tulsa, Oklahoma, in September 1907 to work as a stenographer.

Biddison filed to run as a Democrat in the 1918 Oklahoma House of Representatives election. He placed second in the top-two primary, ahead of third place candidate C. E. King who was eliminated and advanced to the general election alongside Joe E. Kenton. Biddison and Kenton defeated Republican nominees J. J. DeShane and Horace J. Newberry in the November election.

Biddison did not run for reelection in 1920, and was succeeded in office by Republican nominees Bailey E. Bell and Remington Rogers. He was appointed district judge for Tulsa County on May 9, 1921, by Governor James B. A. Robertson. He left office on January 9, 1923.

He died on February 8, 1963, in Tulsa.
