= Patrick S. Nagle =

American political organizer

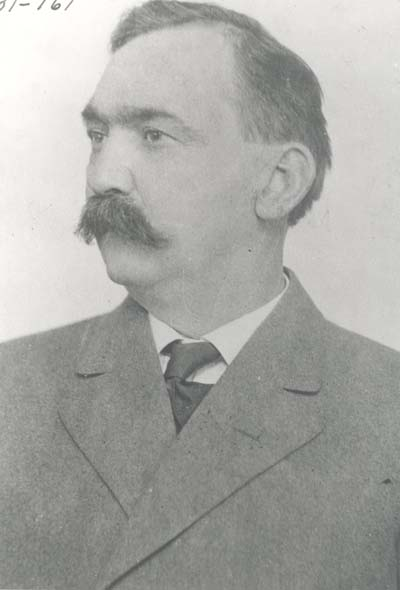

United States Marshal for the Oklahoma Territory
- In office February 18, 1896 – October 25, 1897
- Preceded by: Evett Dumas Nix
- Succeeded by: Canada H. Thompson

Personal details
- Born: November 23, 1858 Indiana, U.S.
- Died: January 12, 1924 (aged 65) Oklahoma, U.S.
- Party: Socialist (after 1908); Democratic (before 1908)

Patrick Sarsfield Nagle was an American political organizer who served as the U.S. Marshal for Oklahoma Territory between 1896 and 1897. During the 1890s, he was a prominent Democratic Party organizer. After 1908, he joined the Socialist Party of Oklahoma as an organizer.

== Biography ==
Nagle's parents, George Nagle and Mary Burke immigrated to the United States in the 1830s from Ireland, eventually settling in Indiana. Patrick S. Nagle was born on November 23, 1858, and grew up in a family of Roman Catholics and Jacksonian Democrats. He moved to Kansas with his family in 1876. He was later elected to county office, admitted to the Kansas Bar Association, and participated in the Land Run of 1889, eventually settling in Kingfisher, Oklahoma. He married Angie McCartney on September 10, 1894.

Nagle was a leading figure in Oklahoma Territory's Democratic Party, specifically within the conservative wing that backed Grover Cleveland. He served as the U.S. Marshal for Oklahoma Territory from February 18, 1896, to October 25, 1897. In 1908, he joined the Socialist Party of Oklahoma and, according to the Encyclopedia of Oklahoma History and Culture, was both respected for his leadership, and "resented" for "his dictatorial methods." He was the socialist nominee in the 1914 United States Senate election in Oklahoma and the 1918 Oklahoma gubernatorial election. He worked with Oscar Ameringer on Jack Walton's 1922 gubernatorial campaign and later served in Walton's administration until his death on January 12, 1924.

== Electoral history ==
1914 United States Senate election in Oklahoma
Party	Candidate	Votes	%
Democratic	Thomas Gore (inc.)	119,442	47.98%
Republican	John H. Burford	73,292	29.44%
Socialist	Patrick S. Nagle	52,229	20.98%
Progressive	William O. Cromwell	3,966	1.59%
Majority		46,150	18.54%
Total votes		248,929	100.00%
Democratic hold			

1918 gubernatorial election, Oklahoma
Party	Candidate	Votes	%	±%
Democratic	James B. A. Robertson	104,132	53.5	+13.9%
Republican	Horace G. McKeever	82,865	42.6	+4.8%
Socialist	Patrick S. Nagle	7,438	3.8	−16.9
Democratic hold		Swing	+13.9%	
