= 10th Oklahoma Legislature =

Leadership
- President Pro Tem of the Senate: William J. Holloway (D)
- Speaker of the House: J.B. Harper (D)
- Composition: Senate; 38 6 House; 83 24

The Tenth Oklahoma Legislature was a meeting of the legislative branch of the government of Oklahoma, composed of the Oklahoma Senate and the Oklahoma House of Representatives. The state legislature met in Oklahoma City, in regular session from January 6 to March 28, 1925, during the term of Governor Martin Trapp.

The 1925 session was marked by the creation of the state's top investigative law enforcement agency, which is today known as the Oklahoma State Bureau of Investigation.

== Dates of sessions ==
- Regular session: January 6-March 28, 1925

Previous: 9th Legislature • Next: 11th Legislature

== Major legislation ==
- The Oklahoma Legislature passed legislation to create the Bureau of Criminal Identification in 1925, which today is known as the Oklahoma State Bureau of Investigation.

== Party composition ==
=== Senate ===
Affiliation	Party (Shading indicates majority caucus)		Total
Affiliation	Democratic	Republican	Total
	38	6	44
Voting share	86.4%	13.6%	

=== House of Representatives ===
Affiliation	Party (Shading indicates majority caucus)		Total
Affiliation	Democratic	Republican	Total
	83	24	107
Voting share	77.6%	22.4%	

== Leadership ==
William J. Holloway served as president pro tempore of the Oklahoma Senate in 1925. J.B. Harper served as Speaker of the Oklahoma House of Representatives.

== Members ==
=== Senate ===
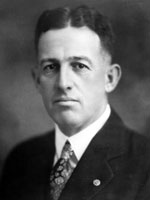
Lieutenant Governor William J. Holloway.

District	Name	Party
Lt Gov	William J. Holloway	Dem
1	Wallace Hughes	Dem
2	Stanley Shepherd	Dem
2	E.M. Reed	Dem
3	L.R. Hughey	Dem
4	Mrs. Lamar Looney	Dem
5	Harry Cordell	Dem
6	S.G. Thomas	Dem
6	A.E. Darnell	Dem
7	Ira Hill	Rep
8	William Otjen	Rep
9	William Cline	Dem
10	Jo Ferguson	Rep
11	Harry Jones	Dem
12	Joe Shearer	Rep
13	Thomas C. Waldrep	Dem
13	C.M. Feuquay	Dem
14	John Jack Barker	Dem
14	W.C. Fidler	Dem
15	Ed Johns	Dem
15	Jed Johnson	Dem
16	W.P. Kimerer	Rep
17	W.C. Lewis	Dem
17	Dave Boyer	Dem
18	Earl Brown	Dem
18	U.T. Rexroat	Dem
19	John Luttrell	Dem
19	Mac Q. Williamson	Dem
20	J.H. McCurley	Dem
20	Thomas F. Memminger	Dem
21	L.P. Bobo	Dem
22	Tom Anglin	Dem
23	Joseph Looney	Dem
24	William J. Holloway	Dem
25	Carl Monk	Dem
26	J.R. McClendon	Dem
27	W.M. Gulager	Dem
27	W.G. Stigler	Dem
28	John Goodall	Dem
29	Harve Langley	Dem
30	H.L. Marshall	Rep
31	Washington E. Hudson	Dem
32	Amos Holland Culp	Dem
33	Floyd Calvert	Dem
34	G.I. Van Dall	Dem

- Table based on state almanac and list of all senators.

=== House of Representatives ===
Name	Party	County
J.D. Beauyear	Dem	Adair
O.W.T. Henderson	Dem	Alfalfa
P.R. Crowley	Dem	Atoka
Roy Coppock	Rep	Beaver, Harper
Ira Finley	Dem	Beckham
Elias Smith	Dem	Blaine
O.E. Thornley	Dem	Bryan
E.P. White	Dem	Bryan
Roy Hangar	Rep	Caddo
Harry Jolly	Dem	Caddo
Price Thompson	Dem	Canadian
J.W. Murphy	Dem	Carter
Lloyd Noble	Rep	Carter
J.A. Morgan	Rep	Cherokee
D.A. Stovall	Dem	Choctaw
William Strong	Dem	Cimarron, Texas
E.V. George	Dem	Cleveland
J.R. Hickman	Dem	Coal
E.M. Reinwand	Dem	Comanche
H.P. Wettengel	Dem	Comanche
Joseph Hooper	Dem	Cotton
O.E. Odell	Dem	Craig
W.I. Cunningham	Dem	Creek
Ida Robertson	Dem	Creek
Edward F. White	Rep	Creek
Thomas P. Stone	Dem	Custer
Isaiah Long	Rep	Delaware
C.R. Flint	Rep	Dewey
G.E. Davison	Rep	Ellis
O.R. Miller	Rep	Garfield
William H. Ryan	Dem	Garfield
James M. Thompson	Dem	Garvin
A.L. Davis	Dem	Grady
David C. Roberts Jr.	Dem	Grady
William M. Thornhill	Rep	Grant
J.G.H. Windle	Dem	Greer
E.C. Abernathy	Dem	Harmon
Newt Sanders	Dem	Haskell
N.J. Johnson	Dem	Hughes
A.E. Bilbrey	Dem	Jackson
Guy Green	Dem	Jefferson
John Garner	Dem	Johnston
G.A. Chappell	Rep	Kay
Joseph Wilson Morris	Rep	Kay
Robert B. McClintic	Rep	Kingfisher
Charles F. Fawks Jr.	Dem	Kiowa
E.M. Cooper	Dem	Latimer
J.B. Harper	Dem	LeFlore
Burton Kidd	Dem	LeFlore
B. Taylor	Rep	Lincoln
M.M. Watson	Rep	Lincoln
O.B. Acton	Rep	Logan
Woody Dixon	Dem	Love
John Voorhees	Rep	Major
David L. Faulk	Dem	Marshall
Fred S. Lee	Dem	Mayes
C.C. Hester	Dem	McClain
Paul Stewart	Dem	McCurtain
Paul Thorn	Dem	McCurtain
L.D. Ogden	Dem	McIntosh
H.W. Broadbent	Dem	Murray
Tom B. O'Bryan	Dem	Muskogee
J.F. Strayhorn	Dem	Muskogee
F.L. Walton	Dem	Muskogee
R.F. Howe	Rep	Noble
W.T. Bluejacket	Dem	Nowata
T.H. Wren	Dem	Okfuskee
H.L. Caldwell	Rep	Oklahoma
Henry L. Cloud	Rep	Oklahoma
Robert C. Graham	Dem	Oklahoma
Anna Laskey	Dem	Oklahoma
R.A. Singletary	Dem	Oklahoma
Allen Street	Dem	Oklahoma
S.M. Hufstedler	Dem	Okmulgee
Charles Lewis	Dem	Okmulgee
David Logan	Dem	Okmulgee
H.N. Cornutt	Dem	Osage
Frank Shaw	Dem	Osage
Perry Porter	Dem	Ottawa
R.W. Skinner	Dem	Ottawa
W.S. Caldwell	Rep	Pawnee
George Hoke	Dem	Payne
Fletcher Davis	Dem	Pittsburg
E.P. Hill	Dem	Pittsburg
Otto Strickland	Dem	Pontotoc
Sam Bailey	Dem	Pottawatomie
M.M. Henderson	Dem	Pottawatomie
L.W. Weaver	Dem	Pushmataha
John Simpler	Dem	Roger Mills
E.H. Lightner	Dem	Rogers
Bart Aldridge	Dem	Seminole
W.A. Carlisle	Dem	Sequoyah
T.M. McCombs	Dem	Sequoyah
P.D. Sullivan	Dem	Stephens
Henry R. King	Dem	Tillman
Frank Boyer	Dem	Tulsa
Phillip Kramer	Dem	Tulsa
John Miller	Dem	Tulsa
Thomas Munroe	Dem	Tulsa
O.H. Terwilleger	Dem	Tulsa
Horace Foster	Dem	Wagoner
A.C. Easter	Rep	Washington
William Rupard	Dem	Washington
Ed Hines	Dem	Washita
Marion Clothier	Rep	Woods
Jerry Coover	Rep	Woodward

- Table based on government database.
