= 1914 United States Senate election in Oklahoma =

- November 3, 1914
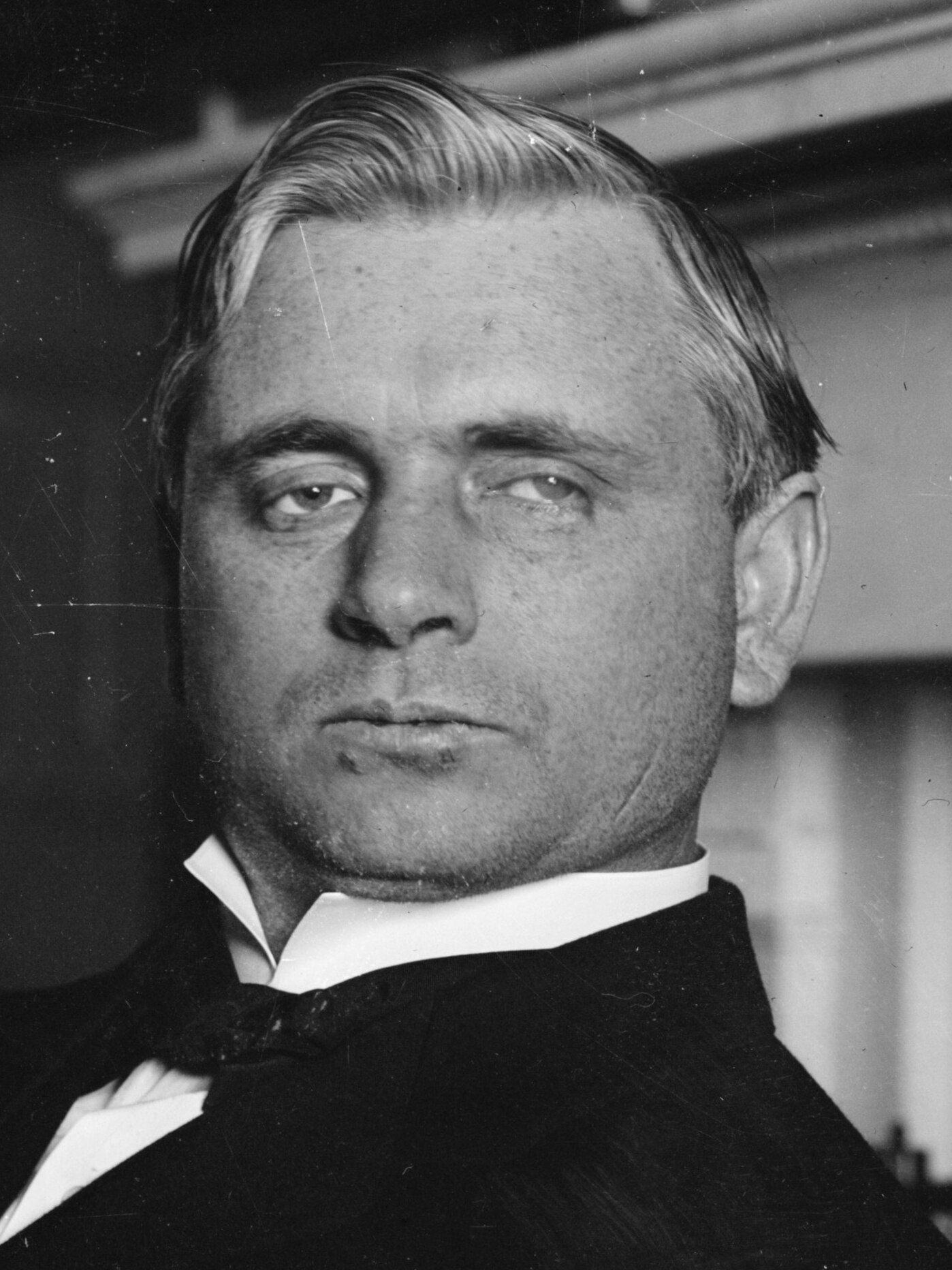

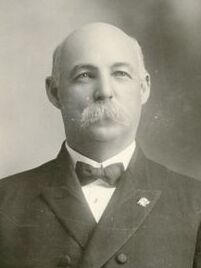

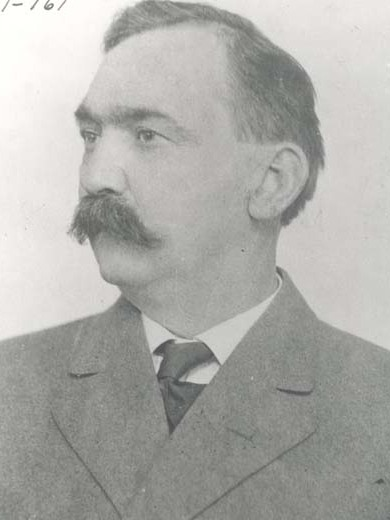
Nominee	Thomas Gore	John H. Burford	Patrick S. Nagle
Party	Democratic	Republican	Socialist
Popular vote	119,442	73,292	52,229
Percentage	47.98%	29.44%	20.98%
- County results Gore: 30–40% 40–50% 50–60% Burford: 30–40% 40–50%
U.S. senator before election
Thomas Gore
Democratic
Elected U.S. Senator
Thomas Gore
Democratic

The 1914 United States Senate election in Oklahoma took place on November 3, 1914. Incumbent Senator Thomas Gore, a Democrat, sought re-election in his first popular election. He was challenged by Republican nominee John H. Burford, a former Justice on the Territorial Oklahoma Supreme Court; Socialist nominee Patrick S. Nagle, a former U.S. Marshal; and Progressive nominee William O. Cromwell, the former State Attorney General. Despite the fact that the left-leaning vote was split several ways in the election, Gore won re-election in a landslide, receiving 48% of the vote to Burford's 29, Nagle's 21%, and Cromwell's 2%.

== Democratic primary ==
=== Candidates ===
- Thomas Gore, incumbent U.S. Senator
- Samuel W. Hayes, former Chief Justice of the Oklahoma Supreme Court

=== Results ===
Democratic primary
Party	Candidate	Votes	%
Democratic	Thomas Gore (inc.)	86,957	75.06%
Democratic	Samuel W. Hayes	28,891	24.94%
Total votes		115,848	100.00%

== Republican primary ==
=== Candidates ===
- John H. Burford, former Justice on the Territorial Oklahoma Supreme Court

=== Results ===
Republican primary
Party	Candidate	Votes	%
Republican	John H. Burford	25,438	100.00%
Total votes		25,438	100.00%

== Socialist Primary ==
=== Candidates ===
- Patrick S. Nagle, former U.S. Marshal

=== Results ===
Socialist primary
Party	Candidate	Votes	%
Socialist	Patrick S. Nagle	15,272	100.00%
Total votes		15,272	100.00%

== Progressive primary ==
=== Candidates ===
- William O. Cromwell, former Oklahoma Attorney General

=== Results ===
Progressive primary
Party	Candidate	Votes	%
Progressive	William O. Cromwell	1,116	55.52%
Progressive	Charles F. Dyer	894	44.48%
Total votes		2,010	100.00%

== General election ==
=== Results ===
1914 United States Senate election in Oklahoma
Party	Candidate	Votes	%
Democratic	Thomas Gore (inc.)	119,442	47.98%
Republican	John H. Burford	73,292	29.44%
Socialist	Patrick S. Nagle	52,229	20.98%
Progressive	William O. Cromwell	3,966	1.59%
Majority		46,150	18.54%
Total votes		248,929	100.00%
Democratic hold			
