= 9th Oklahoma Legislature =

Leadership
- President of the Senate: Martin Trapp (D)
- President Pro Tem of the Senate: Tom Anglin (D)
- Speaker of the House: Murray Gibbons (D)
- Composition: Senate; 32 12; House; 93 14

The Ninth Oklahoma Legislature was a meeting of the legislative branch of the government of Oklahoma, composed of the Oklahoma Senate and the Oklahoma House of Representatives. The state legislature met in Oklahoma City, in regular session from January 2 to March 31, 1923, during the short term of Governor Jack C. Walton, and in two special sessions after his impeachment.

Tom Anglin served as President pro tempore of the Oklahoma Senate and Murray Gibbons served as Speaker of the Oklahoma House of Representatives.

== Dates of sessions ==
- Regular session: January 2-March 31, 1923
- First special session: October 11, 1923 – January 14, 1924
- Second special session: January 15, 1924 – March 15, 1924

Previous: 8th Legislature • Next: 10th Legislature

== Major events ==
- The state legislature successfully impeached Governor Jack C. Walton, who was suspended on October 23, 1923, and convicted and removed from office of November 19, 1923. Lieutenant Governor Martin Trapp became acting governor upon his suspension and the sixth Governor of Oklahoma upon his conviction.
- Soon after taking office, Trapp called the Oklahoma Legislature into special session to investigate state officials and agencies.

== Party composition ==
=== Senate ===
Affiliation	Party (Shading indicates majority caucus)		Total
Affiliation	Democratic	Republican	Total
	32	12	44
Voting share	72.8%	27.2%	

=== House of Representatives ===
Affiliation	Party (Shading indicates majority caucus)		Total
Affiliation	Democratic	Republican	Total
	93	14	107
Voting share	82.6%	26.4%	

== Leadership ==
Lieutenant Governor Martin Trapp served as President of the Senate until the suspension of the governor on October 23, 1923, and his conviction on November 19, 1923. Tom Anglin served as President pro tempore of the Oklahoma Senate. Murray Gibbons was Speaker of the Oklahoma House of Representatives.

== Members ==
=== Senate ===
District	Name	Party
1	Wallace Hughes	Dem
2	C.B. Leedy	Rep
2	E.M. Reed	Dem
3	L.R. Hughey	Dem
4	Mrs. Lamar Looney	Dem
5	Harry Cordell	Dem
6	James Land	Rep
6	A.E. Darnell	Dem
7	Ira Hill	Rep
8	Harry O. Glasser	Rep
9	William Cline	Dem
10	Roy Harvey	Rep
11	Harry Jones	Dem
12	John Golobie	Rep
13	Charles Wells	Rep
13	C.M. Feuquay	Dem
14	John Jack Barker	Dem
14	Ross Lillard	Dem
15	Ed Johns	Dem
15	L.L. West	Dem
16	H. Brown	Rep
17	W.C. Lewis	Dem
17	Jed Johnson	Dem
18	Earl Brown	Dem
18	John Carlock	Dem
19	John Luttrell	Dem
19	W.H. Woods	Dem
20	C.E. McPherren	Dem
20	Thomas F. Memminger	Dem
21	L.P. Bobo	Dem
22	Tom Anglin	Dem
23	Joseph Looney	Dem
24	William J. Holloway	Dem
25	Carl Monk	Dem
26	Joe Ratliff	Dem
27	W.M. Gulager	Dem
27	Clark Nichols	Dem
28	E.M. Frye	Rep
29	Harve Langley	Dem
30	Horace Durant	Rep
31	Washington E. Hudson	Dem
32	Glen Horner	Rep
33	Floyd Calvert	Dem
34	J. Corbett Cornett	Rep

- Table based on state almanac and list of all senators.

=== House of Representatives ===
Name	Party	County
K.G. Comfort	Dem	Adair
Leslie Salter	Rep	Alfalfa
H.G. Eastridge	Dem	Atoka
Leslie Ray	Rep	Beaver, Harper
Ira Finley	Dem	Beckham
L.A. Everhart	Rep	Blaine
C.E. Thornley	Dem	Bryan
E.P. White	Dem	Bryan
F.B. Jones	Dem	Caddo
J.L. Montgomery	Dem	Caddo
Price Thompson	Dem	Canadian
T.J. Pollock	Dem	Carter
Guy Sigler	Dem	Carter
John Gulager	Dem	Cherokee
D.A. Stovall	Dem	Choctaw
I.M. Lightner	Dem	Cimarron, Texas
John Bunyan Phillips	Dem	Cleveland
W.H. Thornsbrough	Dem	Coal
L.E. Goodrich	Dem	Comanche
Fred Hansen	Dem	Cotton
Joe L. Williams	Dem	Craig
Lulu Anderson	Dem	Creek
W.I. Cunningham	Dem	Creek
Charles Hutson	Dem	Creek
J.W. Bremer	Dem	Custer
W.D. Gibson	Dem	Delaware
M.R. Payne	Dem	Dewey
E.M. Beum	Dem	Ellis
V.L. Headrick	Rep	Garfield
William Otjen	Rep	Garfield
James M. Thompson	Dem	Garvin
A.L. Davis	Dem	Grady
Gordon Gray	Dem	Grady
Lewis Watkins	Dem	Grant
J.G.H. Windle	Dem	Greer
H. Treadway	Dem	Harmon
Newt Sanders	Dem	Haskell
C.T. Edwards	Dem	Hughes
C.W. Miller	Dem	Hughes
L.R. Lowry	Dem	Jackson
A.C. Burger	Dem	Jefferson
John Garner	Dem	Johnston
John Bell	Dem	Kay
Walter Franks	Dem	Kay
Henry Cloud	Rep	Kingfisher
James Tolbert	Dem	Kiowa
J.W. Callahan	Dem	Latimer
J.B. Harper	Dem	LeFlore
Burton Kidd	Dem	LeFlore
B. Taylor	Rep	Lincoln
M.M. Watson	Rep	Lincoln
O.B. Acton	Rep	Logan
Woody Dixon	Dem	Love
John Voorhees	Rep	Major
D.T. Wooten	Dem	Marshall
J.C. Lindsey	Dem	Mayes
Murray Gibbons	Dem	McClain
James Dyer	Dem	McCurtain
Paul Stewart	Dem	McCurtain
D.A. Brumley	Dem	McIntosh
E.F. Saltsman	Dem	McIntosh
Jesse Pullen	Dem	Murray
A.K. Berry	Dem	Muskogee
Wesley E. Disney	Dem	Muskogee
Perry Miller	Dem	Muskogee
R.F. Howe	Rep	Noble
Charles Baskin	Dem	Nowata
T.W. Harman	Dem	Okfuskee
T.H. Wren	Dem	Okfuskee
W.S. Burleson	Dem	Oklahoma
Anna Laskey	Dem	Oklahoma
Joe O'Brien	Dem	Oklahoma
W.W. Robertson	Dem	Oklahoma
R.A. Singletary	Dem	Oklahoma
Allen Street	Dem	Oklahoma
Amos Holland Culp	Dem	Okmulgee
Charles Lewis	Dem	Okmulgee
Joseph Rossiter	Dem	Okmulgee
Richard Elam	Dem	Osage
Marshall Smith	Dem	Osage
J.S. Mabon	Rep	Ottawa
George Moothart	Dem	Ottawa
E.M. Funkhouser	Dem	Pawnee
Edith Mitchell	Dem	Payne
Charles Brice	Dem	Pittsburg
T.D. Taylor	Dem	Pittsburg
Fred Brydia	Dem	Pontotoc
N.A.J. Ticer	Dem	Pottawatomie
L.C. Watson	Dem	Pottawatomie
G.T. Johnson	Dem	Pushmataha
W.A. Adams	Dem	Roger Mills
Wayne Bayless	Dem	Rogers
Wilbur Varnum	Dem	Seminole
J.L. Watson	Dem	Sequoyah
W.D. McBee	Dem	Stephens
James C. Nance	Dem	Stephens
Henry R. King	Dem	Tillman
Frank Boyer	Dem	Tulsa
Warren Ferrell	Dem	Tulsa
George S. Long	Dem	Tulsa
John Miller	Dem	Tulsa
J.W. Simpson	Dem	Tulsa
William Silas Vernon	Dem	Wagoner
G.I Vandall	Dem	Washington
Edward Hines	Dem	Washita
Marion Clothier	Rep	Woods
Jerry Coover	Rep	Woodward

- Table based on government database.
