= James H. Sykes =

American politician

Member of the Oklahoma House of Representatives from the Tulsa County district
- In office November 1914 – November 1916 Serving with Washington E. Hudson (Note: The Tulsa County district was a top-two district during the 5th Oklahoma Legislature.)
- Preceded by: Frank Z. Curry; William B. Williams (Note: The Tulsa County district was a top-two district during the 4th Oklahoma Legislature.)
- Succeeded by: Glenn Condon (Note: The Tulsa County district was a top-two district during the 6th Oklahoma Legislature.); Harry H. Rogers

Personal details
- Died: May 2, 1934 Bixby, Oklahoma, U.S.
- Party: Democratic Party

James H. Sykes was an American politician who served in the Oklahoma House of Representatives. He represented Tulsa County as a member of the Democratic Party.

== Biography ==
James H. Sykes was born in 1879 or 1880. He married Esther R. Overton in 1911. The couple later divorced by 1918.

Sykes campaigned for Oklahoma's 3rd congressional district in the 1912 United States House of Representatives elections in Oklahoma. He lost the Democratic primary to James S. Davenport, but carried Tulsa County.

In 1914, Sykes filed for the Oklahoma House of Representatives' Tulsa County seat. He led the Democratic primary alongside Washington E. Hudson, defeating N. J. Coats, A. L. Jonas, Riley League, and M. McKenna in the top two primary. Sykes and Hudson won the November election.

Sykes ran for reelection in 1916 alongside fellow Democrat Kelley E. Gibson, but lost the November election to the Republican nominees Glenn Condon and Harry H. Rogers. Socialist candidates R. S. Lyon and J. A. Mooney also ran placing fifth and sixth.

Sykes died on May 2, 1934, near Bixby, Oklahoma, of "heart trouble."
