= 1918 Oklahoma gubernatorial election =

- November 5, 1918
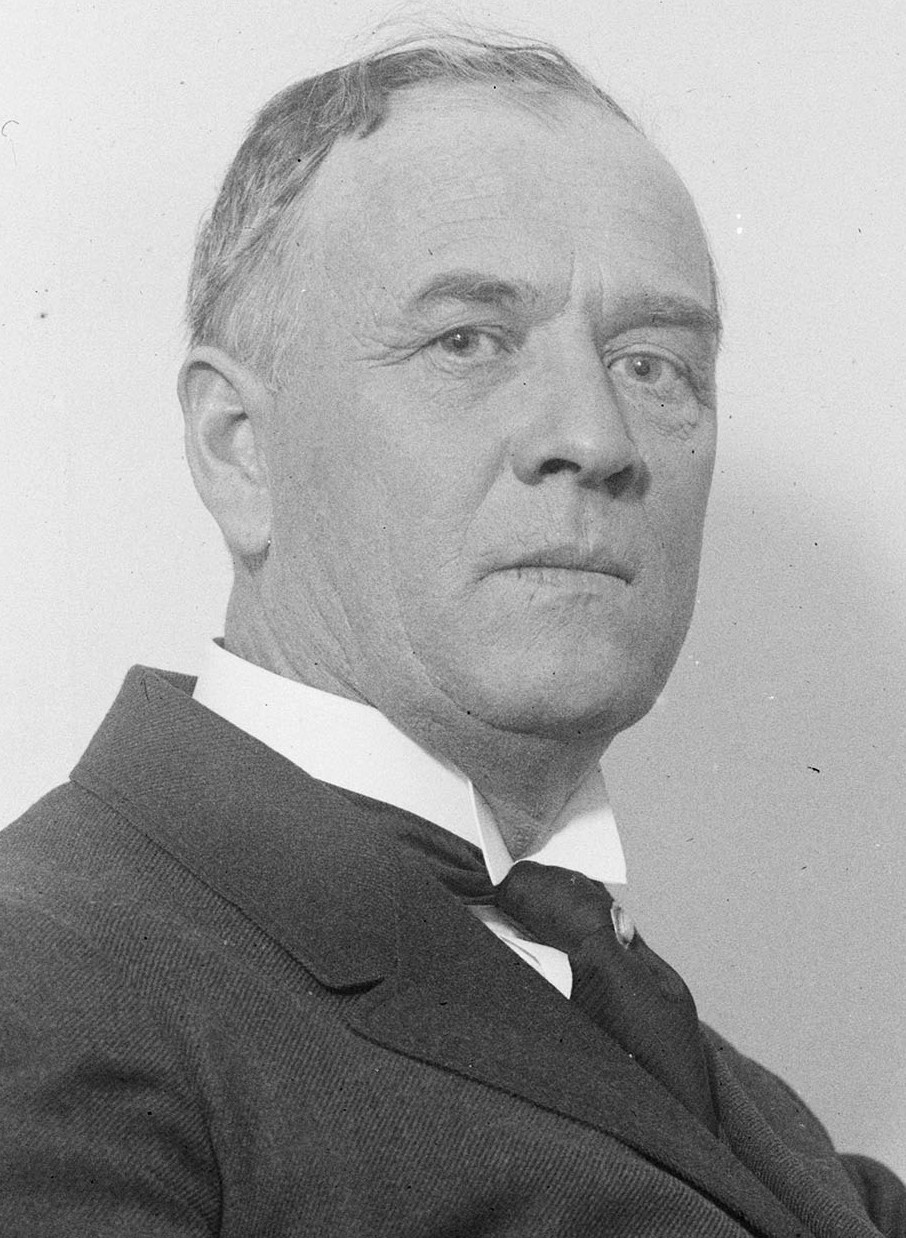

Nominee	James B. A. Robertson	Horace G. McKeever
Party	Democratic	Republican
Popular vote	104,132	82,865
Percentage	53.56%	42.62%
- County results Robertson: 40–50% 50–60% 60–70% 70–80% 80–90% McKeever: 40–50% 50–60% 60–70%
Governor before election
Robert L. Williams
Democratic
Elected Governor
James B. A. Robertson
Democratic

The 1918 Oklahoma gubernatorial election was held on November 5, 1918, and was a race for Governor of Oklahoma. Democrat James B. A. Robertson defeated Republican Horace G. McKeever. Also on the ballot was Patrick S. Nagle of the Socialist Party.

== Primary election ==
=== Democratic party ===
James B. A. Robertson, a former judge who had lost in the Democratic gubernatorial primary in 1914, defeated six other candidates to win the nomination, including future governor 'Alfalfa Bill' Murray.

==== Candidates ====
- W. L. Alexander, State Treasurer of Oklahoma
- Frank P. Davis
- W. A. Durant, member of Oklahoma House of Representatives
- Frank M. Gault
- J. O. McCollister
- William H. Murray, former Speaker of the Oklahoma House of Representatives and former representative from Oklahoma's 4th congressional district
- J. B. A. Robertson, attorney and former member of Oklahoma Supreme Court Commission

==== Results ====
Democratic primary results
Party	Candidate	Votes	%
Democratic	J. B. A. Robertson	48,568	45.00%
Democratic	William H. Murray	24,283	22.50%
Democratic	W. L. Alexander	22,670	21.01%
Democratic	Frank M. Gault	4,904	4.54%
Democratic	William A. Durant	4,164	3.86%
Democratic	Frank P. Davis	2,030	1.88%
Democratic	J. O. McCollister	1,300	1.20%
Total votes		107,919	100.00%

=== Republican party ===
In a race where all five candidates achieved significant vote percentages, Horace G. McKeever came out on top.

==== Candidates ====
- John M. Claypool
- J. T. Dickerson, former member of Oklahoma House of Representatives
- John Golobie, member of Oklahoma Senate
- Horace G. McKeever
- U. S. Stone, banker and oil operator

==== Results ====
Republican primary results
Party	Candidate	Votes	%
Republican	Horace G. McKeever	14,950	36.11%
Republican	John Golobie	9,076	21.92%
Republican	U. S. Stone	8,161	19.71%
Republican	J. T. Dickerson	6,260	15.12%
Republican	John M. Claypool	2,957	7.14%
Total votes		41,404	100.00%

=== Socialist party ===
==== Candidates ====
- Patrick S. Nagle

==== Results ====
Socialist primary results
Party	Candidate	Votes	%
Socialist	Patrick S. Nagle	5,791	100.00%
Total votes		5,791	100.00%

== General election ==
=== Results ===
1918 Oklahoma gubernatorial election
Party	Candidate	Votes	%	±%
Democratic	J. B. A. Robertson	104,132	53.56%	+13.91%
Republican	Horace G. McKeever	82,865	42.62%	+4.81%
Socialist	Patrick S. Nagle	7,438	3.83%	−16.95%
Total votes		194,435	100.00%	
Majority		21,267	10.94%	
Democratic hold		Swing	+9.09%	

=== Results by county ===
County	J. B. A. Robertson Democratic		Horace G. McKeever Republican		Patrick S. Nagle Socialist		Margin		Total votes cast
County	#	%	#	%	#	%	#	%	Total votes cast
Adair	1,019	51.67%	923	46.81%	30	1.52%	96	4.87%	1,972
Alfalfa	892	36.74%	1,393	57.37%	143	5.89%	-501	-20.63%	2,428
Atoka	1,346	55.32%	1,037	42.62%	50	2.16%	309	12.70%	2,433
Beaver	878	45.49%	978	50.67%	74	3.83%	-100	-5.18%	1,930
Beckham	1,253	62.93%	600	30.14%	138	6.93%	653	32.80%	1,991
Blaine	831	35.35%	1,242	52.83%	278	11.82%	-411	-17.48%	2,351
Bryan	2,234	75.68%	609	20.63%	109	3.69%	1,625	55.05%	2,952
Caddo	1,949	44.16%	2,309	52.32%	155	3.51%	-360	-8.16%	4,413
Canadian	1,529	50.78%	1,362	45.23%	120	3.99%	167	5.55%	3,011
Carter	2,083	73.97%	639	22.69%	94	3.34%	1,444	51.28%	2,816
Cherokee	1,256	49.61%	1,246	49.21%	30	1.18%	10	0.39%	2,532
Choctaw	1,097	70.01%	356	22.72%	114	7.28%	741	47.29%	1,567
Cimarron	373	53.44%	289	41.40%	36	5.16%	84	12.03%	698
Cleveland	1,323	65.08%	625	30.74%	85	4.18%	698	34.33%	2,033
Coal	1,033	65.05%	454	28.59%	101	6.36%	579	36.46%	1,588
Comanche	1,374	55.58%	968	39.16%	130	5.26%	406	16.42%	2,472
Cotton	1,011	60.50%	611	36.56%	49	2.93%	400	23.94%	1,671
Craig	1,459	52.69%	1,276	46.08%	34	1.23%	183	6.61%	2,769
Creek	2,775	52.23%	2,422	45.59%	116	2.18%	353	6.64%	5,313
Custer	1,031	44.92%	1,181	51.46%	83	3.62%	-150	-6.54%	2,295
Delaware	1,021	54.28%	817	43.43%	43	2.29%	204	10.85%	1,881
Dewey	643	36.93%	794	45.61%	304	17.46%	-151	-8.67%	1,741
Ellis	494	32.27%	835	54.54%	202	13.19%	-341	-22.27%	1,531
Garfield	1,513	31.33%	3,176	65.77%	140	2.90%	-1,663	-34.44%	4,829
Garvin	1,798	71.89%	651	26.03%	52	2.08%	1,147	45.86%	2,501
Grady	2,231	70.67%	810	25.66%	116	3.67%	1,421	45.01%	3,157
Grant	1,091	41.90%	1,449	55.65%	64	2.46%	-358	-13.75%	2,604
Greer	996	71.45%	376	26.97%	22	1.58%	620	44.48%	1,394
Harmon	766	82.63%	140	15.10%	21	2.27%	626	67.53%	927
Harper	482	40.30%	647	54.10%	67	5.60%	-165	-13.80%	1,196
Haskell	1,108	56.65%	774	39.57%	74	3.78%	334	17.08%	1,956
Hughes	1,591	61.05%	982	37.68%	33	1.27%	609	23.37%	2,606
Jackson	1,392	75.90%	364	19.85%	78	4.25%	1,028	56.05%	1,834
Jefferson	1,079	71.93%	389	25.93%	32	2.13%	690	46.00%	1,500
Johnston	1,044	60.00%	630	36.21%	66	3.79%	414	23.79%	1,740
Kay	1,682	41.39%	2,274	55.95%	108	2.66%	-592	-14.57%	4,064
Kingfisher	791	32.12%	1,527	62.00%	145	5.89%	-736	-29.88%	2,463
Kiowa	1,218	51.07%	1,121	47.00%	46	1.93%	97	4.07%	2,385
Latimer	748	55.57%	539	40.04%	59	4.38%	209	15.53%	1,346
Le Flore	2,101	55.09%	1,630	42.74%	83	2.18%	471	12.35%	3,814
Lincoln	1,555	37.31%	2,461	59.05%	152	3.65%	-906	-21.74%	4,168
Logan	1,275	38.12%	1,933	57.79%	137	4.10%	-658	-19.67%	3,345
Love	856	81.52%	159	15.14%	35	3.33%	697	66.38%	1,050
Major	474	28.06%	863	51.10%	352	20.84%	-389	-23.03%	1,689
Marshall	841	64.89%	365	28.16%	90	6.94%	476	36.73%	1,296
Mayes	1,127	53.06%	955	44.96%	42	1.98%	172	8.10%	2,124
McClain	994	66.09%	469	31.18%	41	2.73%	525	34.91%	1,504
McCurtain	955	73.69%	305	23.53%	36	2.78%	650	50.15%	1,296
McIntosh	1,185	60.00%	725	36.71%	65	3.29%	460	23.29%	1,975
Murray	903	71.72%	336	26.69%	20	1.59%	567	45.04%	1,259
Muskogee	2,692	64.10%	1,473	35.07%	35	0.83%	1,219	29.02%	4,200
Noble	916	40.95%	1,239	55.39%	82	3.67%	-323	-14.44%	2,237
Nowata	933	43.64%	1,180	55.19%	25	1.17%	-247	-11.55%	2,138
Okfuskee	887	59.29%	557	37.23%	52	3.48%	330	22.06%	1,496
Oklahoma	5,461	54.53%	4,332	43.26%	222	2.22%	1,129	11.27%	10,015
Okmulgee	1,809	52.09%	1,550	44.63%	114	3.28%	259	7.46%	3,473
Osage	1,443	53.64%	1,184	44.01%	63	2.34%	259	9.63%	2,690
Ottawa	2,222	53.85%	1,808	43.82%	96	2.33%	414	10.03%	4,126
Pawnee	1,123	46.02%	1,205	49.39%	112	4.59%	-82	-3.36%	2,440
Payne	1,484	42.93%	1,808	52.30%	165	4.77%	-324	-9.37%	3,457
Pittsburg	2,602	66.04%	1,222	31.02%	116	2.94%	1,380	35.03%	3,940
Pontotoc	1,785	74.31%	567	23.61%	50	2.08%	1,218	50.71%	2,402
Pottawatomie	2,086	54.59%	1,592	41.66%	143	3.74%	494	12.93%	3,821
Pushmataha	793	56.85%	534	38.28%	68	4.87%	259	18.57%	1,395
Roger Mills	695	50.11%	516	37.20%	176	12.69%	179	12.91%	1,387
Rogers	1,425	53.07%	1,190	44.32%	70	2.61%	235	8.75%	2,685
Seminole	1,151	51.59%	987	44.24%	93	4.17%	164	7.35%	2,231
Sequoyah	1,395	55.38%	1,082	42.95%	42	1.67%	313	12.43%	2,519
Stephens	1,337	70.55%	461	24.33%	97	5.12%	876	46.23%	1,895
Texas	947	53.81%	743	42.22%	70	3.98%	204	11.59%	1,760
Tillman	1,203	74.67%	360	22.35%	48	2.98%	843	52.33%	1,611
Tulsa	4,011	52.74%	3,456	45.44%	138	1.81%	555	7.30%	7,605
Wagoner	820	54.49%	595	39.53%	90	5.98%	225	14.95%	1,505
Washington	1,130	46.85%	1,227	50.87%	55	2.28%	-97	-4.02%	2,412
Washita	1,304	59.95%	580	26.67%	291	13.38%	724	33.29%	2,175
Woods	936	38.77%	1,365	56.55%	113	4.68%	-429	-17.77%	2,414
Woodward	842	41.21%	1,076	52.67%	125	6.12%	-234	-11.45%	2,043
Totals	104,132	53.56%	82,865 (Note: The county figures add up to 82,905)	40.62%	7,438 (Note: The county figures add up to 7,445)	3.83%	21,267	10.94%	194,435

==== Counties that flipped from Republican to Democratic ====
- Canadian
- Comanche
- Craig
- Creek
- Oklahoma
- Ottawa
- Pottawatomie
- Tulsa

==== Counties that flipped from Socialist to Democratic ====
- Beckham
- Kiowa
- Roger Mills
