= Frank Z. Curry =

American politician

Member of the Oklahoma House of Representatives from the Tulsa County district
- In office 1912–1914 Serving with William B. Williams (Note: The Tulsa County district was a top-two district during the 4th Oklahoma Legislature.)
- Preceded by: J. I. Gillespie
- Succeeded by: Washington E. Hudson (Note: The Tulsa County district was a top-two district during the 5th Oklahoma Legislature.); James H. Sykes

Personal details
- Born: August 31, 1867 Greene County, Georgia, U.S.
- Died: November 7, 1958 (aged 91) Muskogee, Oklahoma, U.S.
- Party: Democratic Party

Frank Z. Curry was an American politician who served in the Oklahoma House of Representatives from 1912 to 1914. He was a member of the Democratic Party and represented Tulsa County.

== Biography ==
Frank Z. Curry was born on August 31, 1867, in Greene County, Georgia. He graduated from the University of Georgia Law School in 1888 and served in the Spanish-American War. Prior to moving to Oklahoma, Curry worked as an attorney and county court judge for Butts County, Georgia.

In 1912, Curry began calling the Democratic Party leadership in Tulsa corrupt. He ran in the Democratic primary to represent Tulsa County in the Oklahoma House of Representatives, defeating incumbent J. I. Gillespie. In a top-two general election, Curry and fellow Democrat William B. Williams ran against Republicans C. H. Cleveland and John A. Oliphant. Curry won the November election. He was succeeded in office by Washington E. Hudson.

In 1914, he ran for the 31st district of the Oklahoma Senate against incumbent A. F. Vandeventer, with both Curry and Vandeventer losing to R. L. Davidson. The Tulsa Tribune opposed his candidacy, calling him "Standard Oil's candidate." In 1916, he again ran for the Oklahoma legislature and lost to incumbent James H. Sykes.

In 1930, he again ran for the Oklahoma legislature, but he placed 5th in the primary. In 1936, he ran against incumbent state representative Seth G. Eby and the two advanced to a runoff, which Curry lost.

Curry died on November 7, 1958, in Muskogee, Oklahoma.
