= William B. Williams (Oklahoma politician) =

American politician and judge

Member of the Oklahoma House of Representatives from the Tulsa County district
- In office 1912–1914 Serving with Frank Z. Curry (Note: The Tulsa County district was a top-two district during the 4th Oklahoma Legislature.)
- Preceded by: J. I. Gillespie
- Succeeded by: James H. Sykes (Note: The Tulsa County district was a top-two district during the 5th Oklahoma Legislature.); Washington E. Hudson

Personal details
- Born: 1859 or 1860 Virginia, U.S.
- Died: December 4, 1931 Riverside, California, U.S.
- Resting place: Long Beach, California, U.S.
- Party: Democratic Party

William B. Williams was an American politician and judge who served in the Oklahoma House of Representatives from 1912 to 1914. He was a member of the Democratic Party and represented Tulsa County.

== Biography ==
William B. Williams was born in Virginia in 1859 or 1860 and moved to Illinois during his childhood. As an adult, he lived in California, Colorado, and Kansas before settling in present-day Perry, Oklahoma. In 1903, he moved to Broken Arrow, Indian Territory, where he worked as an attorney and was a member of the Christian Science church.

In 1912, he ran in the Democratic Party primary for the Tulsa County district of the Oklahoma House of Representatives against Frank Z. Curry and incumbent J. I. Gillespie. Curry and Williams advanced to the general election and defeated Republican candidates C. H. Cleveland and John A. Oliphant. He served in the 4th Oklahoma Legislature was succeeded in office by Democrat James H. Sykes.

In 1918, he was appointed county judge for Tulsa County and in 1921 he was appointed district judge. He served until 1926 when he was appointed to the Oklahoma Supreme Court Commission by Governor Martin Trapp.

He died on December 4, 1931, in Riverside, California, of "heart trouble." He was buried in Long Beach, California.
