= 7th Oklahoma Legislature =

Leadership
- President of the Senate: Martin Trapp (D)
- President Pro Tem of the Senate: R.L. Davidson (D)
- Speaker of the House: Thomas C. Waldrep (D)
- Composition: Senate; 34 10; House; 79 30

The Seventh Oklahoma Legislature was a meeting of the legislative branch of the government of Oklahoma, composed of the Oklahoma Senate and the Oklahoma House of Representatives. The Oklahoma State Capitol, which was completed on June 30, 1917, was now available to state legislators The building was completed on June 30, 1917. They met in regular session from January 7 to March 29, 1919, during the first year of the term of Governor James B.A. Robertson. Among the newly elected members of the Oklahoma House of Representatives was George B. Schwabe, who would soon serve as the first Republican Speaker of the Oklahoma House of Representatives.

Lieutenant Governor Martin E. Trapp served as the President of the Senate, R. L. Davidson served as the President pro tempore of the Oklahoma Senate, and Thomas C. Waldrep served as Speaker of the Oklahoma House of Representatives.

== Dates of session ==
- January 7-March 29, 1919

Previous: 6th Legislature • Next: 8th Legislature

== Major events ==
- The Oklahoma State Capitol, which was completed on June 30, 1917, was used by the state legislature for the first time during the 1919 session.

== Party composition ==
=== Senate ===
Affiliation	Party (Shading indicates majority caucus)		Total
Affiliation	Democratic	Republican	Total
	34	10	44
Voting share	77.3%	22.7%	

=== House of Representatives ===
Affiliation	Party (Shading indicates majority caucus)		Total
Affiliation	Democratic	Republican	Total
	79	30	109
Voting share	72.5%	27.5%	

== Leadership ==
=== Senate ===
Lieutenant Governor Martin E. Trapp served as the President of the Senate, which gave him a tie-breaking vote and allowed him to serve as a presiding officer. R.L. Davidson was elected by state senators to serve as the President pro tempore of the Oklahoma Senate, the primary presiding officer of the Oklahoma Senate.

=== House ===
Thomas C. Waldrep served as Speaker of the Oklahoma House of Representatives.

== Members ==
=== Senate ===
District	Name	Party
Lt Gov	Martin E. Trapp	Dem
1	M. W. Pugh	Dem
2	Arthur Leach	Dem
2	James Spurlock	Dem
3	William Briggs	Rep
4	George L. Wilson	Dem
5	Harry Cordell	Dem
6	R. L. Knie	Dem
6	T. C. Simpson	Dem
7	Joe Sherman	Rep
8	Eugene Watrous	Rep
9	W. T. Clark	Rep
9	R. L. Hall	Dem
10	Tom Testerman	Rep
11	M. F. Ingraham	Rep
12	John Golobie	Rep
13	T. B. Hogg	Dem
13	M. W. Lynch	Rep
14	T. F. Hensley	Dem
14	W. K. Snyder	Dem
15	C. A. Dearmon	Dem
15	Frank Carpenter	Dem
16	H. Brown	Rep
17	L. A. Morton	Dem
17	Elmer Thomas	Dem
18	James Draughon	Dem
18	Fred Tucker	Dem
19	William Robert Wallace	Dem
19	Jep Knight	Dem
20	J. T. McIntosh	Dem
20	Wilburn Cartwright	Dem
21	J. E. Fleming	Dem
22	C. W. Board	Dem
23	Luther Harrison	Dem
24	W. C. McAlister	Dem
25	E. P. Hill	Dem
26	John Vaughan	Dem
27	S. S. Mayfield	Dem
27	Eugene Kerr	Dem
28	Thomas LaFayette Rider	Dem
29	Pete Coyne	Dem
30	J. J. Smith	Dem
31	R. L. Davidson	Dem
32	S. L. Johnson	Dem
33	E. E. Woods	Rep

- Table based on state almanac.

=== House of Representatives ===
Name	Party	County
D. B. Collums	Dem	Adair
W. S. David	Rep	Alfalfa
William Gill	Dem	Atoka
J. W. Steffen	Rep	Beaver, Harper
W. A. Hornbeck	Dem	Beckham
L. A. Everhart	Rep	Blaine
Porter Newman	Dem	Bryan
J. B. Smith	Dem	Bryan
Joseph Hollarn	Rep	Caddo
J. E. Thirsk	Rep	Caddo
John Jack Barker	Dem	Canadian
J. L. Trevathan	Rep	Canadian
J. L. Galt	Dem	Carter
D. S. Hoover	Dem	Carter
Sam Redburn	Rep	Cherokee
D. A. Stovall	Dem	Choctaw
S. L. Portwood	Dem	Cimarron, Texas
John Bunyan Phillips	Dem	Cleveland
Frank Brinkworth	Dem	Coal
R. B. Thomas	Dem	Comanche
John McTaggart	Dem	Comanche, Cotton
Lon Morris	Dem	Cotton
G. R. Hill	Dem	Craig
William Cheatham	Dem	Creek
J. M. Morgan	Dem	Creek
W. D. Crane	Rep	Custer
E. A. Olmstead	Rep	Custer
John Gibson	Dem	Delaware
G. W. Trimble	Dem	Dewey
Bert Hill	Rep	Ellis
J. B. Campbell	Rep	Garfield
H. O. Glasser	Rep	Garfield
Alfred Stevenson	Dem	Garvin
Bert Jackson	Dem	Grady
M. I. Stokes	Dem	Grady
T. E. Beck	Rep	Grant
Harry D. Henry	Dem	Greer
L. A. Pearson	Dem	Harmon
Anderson Webb	Dem	Haskell
Tom Anglin	Dem	Hughes
B. F. Harrison	Dem	Hughes
W. D. Ballard	Dem	Jackson
Ed Dabney	Dem	Jackson
C. S. Storms	Dem	Jefferson
S. E. Cummings	Dem	Johnston
Samuel Elder	Rep	Kay
W. P. Kimerer	Rep	Kingfisher
R. R. Fitzgerald	Dem	Kiowa
W. G. Goodard	Dem	Kiowa
L. P. Bobo	Dem	Latimer
J. B. Harper	Dem	LeFlore
M. W. Romine	Dem	LeFlore
Ed Ambler	Rep	Lincoln
B. Taylor	Rep	Lincoln
Amos Ewing	Rep	Logan
John O'Neill	Dem	Logan
Asa Walden	Dem	Love
J. R. Haley	Rep	Major
Syd Wheeler	Dem	Marshall
Gideon Morgan	Dem	Mayes
E. E. Glasco	Dem	McClain
John Scott	Dem	McCurtain
W. M. Duffy	Dem	McIntosh
H. W. Broadbent	Dem	Murray
Wesley E. Disney	Dem	Muskogee
L. E. Neff	Dem	Muskogee
Robert West	Dem	Muskogee
Roy Harvey	Rep	Noble
George B. Schwabe	Rep	Nowata
W. N. Barry	Dem	Okfuskee
S. S. Butterfield	Dem	Oklahoma
I. L. Harris	Rep	Oklahoma
W. W. Robertson	Dem	Oklahoma
Charles Ruth	Dem	Oklahoma
Allen Street	Dem	Oklahoma
Bert Hodges	Dem	Okmulgee
L. A. Wismeyer	Rep	Osage
J. S. Mabon	Rep	Ottawa
Millard Grubb	Rep	Pawnee
Charles Platt	Rep	Payne
John Vaughan	Rep	Payne
S. Z. Fitzgerald	Dem	Pittsburg
Paul Nesbitt	Dem	Pittsburg
T. W. Smith	Dem	Pittsburg
Date Crawford	Dem	Pontotoc
W. H. Ebey	Dem	Pontotoc
N.A.J. Ticer	Dem	Pottawatomie
Thomas C. Waldrep	Dem	Pottawatomie
G. T. Johnson	Dem	Pushmataha
J. T. Nicholson	Dem	Roger Mills
Tom Kight	Dem	Rogers
W. W. Pryor	Dem	Seminole
J. H. Dodson	Dem	Sequoyah
L. C. McNabb	Dem	Sequoyah
L. Akers	Dem	Stephens
John E. Williams	Dem	Tillman
W. Valjean Biddison	Dem	Tulsa
Joe W. Kenton	Dem	Tulsa
T. A. Parkinson	Dem	Wagoner
A. E. Craver	Rep	Washington
W. T. Graves	Dem	Washita
J. H. Hay	Dem	Washita
Marion Clothier	Rep	Woods
Jerry Coover	Rep	Woodward

- Table based on government database.
