= Earl Foster =

American politician (1889–1965)

Member of the Oklahoma Supreme Court Commission
- In office June 28, 1927 – September 10, 1930
- Preceded by: Dudley Monk
- Succeeded by: Position abolished

Personal details
- Born: February 24, 1889 Marion County, Kansas, U.S.
- Died: October 26, 1965 (aged 76) Oklahoma City, Oklahoma, U.S.
- Party: Democratic Party
- Children: 2, including Earl Foster Jr.
- Education: University of Oklahoma; University of Oklahoma College of Law

Earl Foster was an American politician who served on the Oklahoma Supreme Court Commission from 1927 to 1930.

== Biography ==
Earl Foster was born on February 24, 1889, in Marion County, Kansas, to Andrew Jackson Foster and Elizabeth Rachel Dixon. His family moved to Lincoln County, Oklahoma Territory, when he was three years old. He graduated from Chandler High School in 1906, the University of Oklahoma in 1912, and the University of Oklahoma College of Law in 1913. After graduation he was appointed city attorney for Drumright, Oklahoma. He served in that role until he assumed the office of Creek County district attorney on January 1, 1917. He served in office until 1920. He was appointed to the Oklahoma Supreme Court Commission on June 28, 1927, and served until he retired on September 10, 1930. He was a member of the Democratic Party and served on the Oklahoma City Public Schools board of education.

In 1916, he married Alta Sawyer and the couple had two children, including Oklahoma state representative Earl Foster Jr. He died on October 26, 1965, in Oklahoma City.
