= William Lee Alexander =

American politician (died 1938)

Bill Alexander

3rd State Treasurer of Oklahoma
- In office January 1915 – January 1919
- Governor: Robert L. Williams
- Preceded by: Robert Dunlop
- Succeeded by: A. N. Leecraft

Personal details
- Born: William Lee Alexander Charlotte, North Carolina, United States
- Died: October 2, 1938 Pryor, Oklahoma, United States
- Party: Democratic Party

William Lee "Bill" Alexander was an American politician who served as the Oklahoma State Treasurer from 1915 to 1919.

== Biography ==
William Lee "Bill" Alexander was born in Charlotte, North Carolina. In 1872, he moved to Whitesboro, Texas, where he lived until he participated in the Land Run of 1889 in Oklahoma Territory. He was the county treasurer for Oklahoma County, Oklahoma Territory, from 1896 to 1900. A member of the Democratic Party, he was elected Oklahoma State Treasurer in 1914 and served in office from 1915 to 1919, when he was succeeded by A. N. Leecraft. He ran in the 1918 Oklahoma gubernatorial election, but lost the Democratic primary. He died on October 2, 1938, in Pryor, Oklahoma.
