= William O. Cromwell =

American politician

Attorney General of Oklahoma Territory
- In office January 5, 1906 – November 16, 1907
- Appointed by: Frank Frantz
- Succeeded by: Position disestablished

Personal details
- Born: November 20, 1860
- Party: Progressive Party (1914)

William O. Cromwell was an American politician who served as the last attorney general of Oklahoma Territory during the administration of Frank Frantz.

== Electoral history ==
1914 United States Senate election in Oklahoma
Party	Candidate	Votes	%
Democratic	Thomas Gore (inc.)	119,442	47.98%
Republican	John H. Burford	73,292	29.44%
Socialist	Patrick S. Nagle	52,229	20.98%
Progressive	William O. Cromwell	3,966	1.59%
Majority		46,150	18.54%
Total votes		248,929	100.00%
Democratic hold			
