= 5th Oklahoma Legislature =

Term of state legislature in Oklahoma, US

Leadership
- President of the Senate: Martin E. Trapp (D)
- President Pro Tem of the Senate: E. L. Mitchell (D)
- Speaker of the House: Alonzo McCrory (D)
- Composition: Senate; 37 6 1 House; 73 18 6

The Fifth Oklahoma Legislature was a meeting of the legislative branch of the government of Oklahoma, composed of the Oklahoma Senate and the Oklahoma House of Representatives. The state legislature met in Oklahoma City, in regular session from January 5 to March 23, 1915, and in special session from January 17 to February 22, 1916, during the first two years of the term of Governor Robert L. Williams. The legislature included six Socialists, who only served for a single term. The only bill sponsored by a Socialist that became Oklahoma law involved hunting. The 1916 special session was called after the U.S. Supreme Court struck down Oklahoma's Jim Crow law.

Lieutenant Governor Martin E. Trapp served as the President of the Senate and E. L. Mitchell served as the President pro tempore of the Oklahoma Senate. Alonzo McCrory served as Speaker of the Oklahoma House of Representatives.

== Dates of sessions ==
- Regular session: January 5-March 23, 1915
- Special session: January 17-February 22, 1916

Previous: 4th Legislature • Next: 6th Legislature

== Party composition ==
=== Senate ===
Affiliation	Party (Shading indicates majority caucus)			Total
Affiliation	Democratic	Republican	Socialist	Total
	37	6	1	44
Voting share	84.1%	13.6%	2.3%	

=== House of Representatives ===
Affiliation	Party (Shading indicates majority caucus)			Total
Affiliation	Democratic	Republican	Socialist	Total
	73	18	6	97
Voting share	75.3%	18.5%	6.2%	

== Leadership ==
=== Senate ===
Lieutenant Governor Martin E. Trapp served as the President of the Senate, which gave him a tie-breaking vote and allowed him to serve as a presiding officer. E. L. Mitchell was elected by state senators to serve as the President pro tempore of the Oklahoma Senate, the primary presiding officer of the Oklahoma Senate.

=== House ===
Alonzo McCrory of Ringling, Oklahoma, served as Speaker of the Oklahoma House of Representatives and William A. Durant served as Speaker Pro Tempore.

== Members ==
=== Senate ===
District	Name	Party
Lt-Gov	Martin E. Trapp	Dem
1	W. J. Risen	Dem
2	E. L. Mitchell	Dem
2	G. E. Wilson	Soc
3	W. M. Bickel	Dem
4	J. L. Carpenter	Dem
5	Harry Cordell	Dem
6	James Austin	Dem
6	O. J. Logan	Dem
7	A. C. Beeman	Rep
8	Eugene Watrous	Rep
9	William Cline	Dem
9	J. E. Curran	Rep
10	George Waters	Dem
11	Clarence Davis	Dem
12	John H. Burford	Rep
13	Charles F. Barrett	Dem
13	C. L. Edmonson	Dem
14	Tom McMechan	Dem
14	Ben Wilson	Dem
15	Thomas O'Neill	Dem
15	John Pugh	Dem
16	S. W. Hogan	Rep
17	Frank Beauman	Dem
17	Elmer Thomas	Dem
18	R. A. Keller	Dem
18	Fred Tucker	Dem
19	Joe Edwards	Dem
19	Ben Franklin	Dem
20	J. T. McIntosh	Dem
20	John Hickman	Dem
21	M. M. Ryan	Dem
22	C. W. Board	Dem
23	R. H. Chase	Dem
24	W. C. McAlister	Dem
25	W. V. Buckner	Dem
26	C. C. Shaw	Dem
27	T. H. Davidson	Dem
27	Campbell Russell	Dem
28	M. S. Blassingame	Dem
29	O. W. Killam	Dem
30	George W. Fields Jr.	Dem
31	R. L. Davidson	Dem
32	Jason Sutherlin	Rep
33	W. A. Chase	Dem

- Table based on state almanac.

=== House of Representatives ===
Name	Party	County
Thomas J. Welch	Dem	Adair
J. C. Smith	Rep	Alfalfa
James Thurmond	Dem	Atoka
Howard Drake	Rep	Beaver, Harper
Thomas McLemore	Soc	Beckham
L. A. Everhart	Rep	Blaine
William A. Durant	Dem	Bryan
Gustavus Ramsey	Dem	Bryan
Joseph Baker	Dem	Caddo
Frank Carpenter	Dem	Caddo
T. F. Hensley	Dem	Canadian
Kelly Brown	Dem	Carter
J. D. Cox	Dem	Cherokee
W. L. Garner	Dem	Choctaw
Thomas W. Hunter	Dem	Choctaw
Charles Williams	Dem	Cimarron, Texas
H. O. Miller	Dem	Cleveland
Wilburn Cartwright	Dem	Coal
Lewis Hunter	Dem	Comanche, Cotton
William Powell	Dem	Comanche, Cotton
Bryant Cash	Dem	Craig
William J. Ladd	Rep	Creek
John Simpson	Dem	Custer
Lee Howe	Dem	Delaware
David C. Kirkpatrick	Soc	Dewey
C. H. Holmes	Rep	Ellis
Charles C. Childers	Dem	Garfield
Marvin McCord	Rep	Garfield
L. B. Abney	Dem	Garvin
Cicero Murray	Dem	Garvin
L. N. Barbee	Dem	Grady
Bert Jackson	Dem	Grady
J. E. Lemon	Dem	Grant
J. O. McCollister	Dem	Greer
H. Treadway	Dem	Harmon
A. H. Huggins	Dem	Haskell
Ben F. Harrison	Dem	Hughes
R. J. Morgan	Dem	Jackson
Alonzo McCrory	Dem	Jefferson
J. J. Clark	Dem	Johnston
Henry Headley	Rep	Kay
C. L. Pinkham	Dem	Kay
J. A. Marsh	Rep	Kingfisher
R. R. Fitzgerald	Dem	Kiowa
N. D. Pritchett	Soc	Kiowa
Cliff Peery	Dem	Latimer
G. L. Council	Dem	LeFlore
T. G. McMahan	Dem	LeFlore
Ed Keegan	Rep	Lincoln
Jake Zabloudil	Rep	Lincoln
O. B. Acton	Rep	Logan
Amos Ewing	Rep	Logan
Asa Walden	Dem	Love
Charles Henry Ingham	Soc	Major
O. G. Rollins	Dem	Marshall
Johnson Crawford	Dem	Mayes
E. E. Glasco	Dem	McClain
Tom G. Taylor	Dem	McCurtain
W. M. Duffy	Dem	McIntosh
George Pullen	Democrat	Murray
R. L. Disney	Dem	Muskogee
Napoleon Bonaparte Maxey	Dem	Muskogee
E. T. Testerman	Rep	Noble
Eldon Sams	Rep	Nowata
W. N. Berry	Dem	Okfuskee
Joseph Dickerson	Rep	Oklahoma
Jesse Norton	Rep	Oklahoma
R. L. Peebly	Dem	Oklahoma
John H. Wright	Dem	Oklahoma
James Young	Dem	Oklahoma
S. L. Johnson	Dem	Okmulgee
Louis Bryant	Dem	Osage
James Moore	Dem	Ottawa
G. W. Goodwin	Rep	Pawnee
J. L. McKeown	Dem	Payne
Tom Haile	Dem	Pittsburg
Paul Nesbitt	Dem	Pittsburg
T. G. Wilkes	Dem	Pittsburg
Sam Hargis	Dem	Pontotoc
W. K. Dunn	Dem	Pottawatomie
R. R. Hendon	Dem	Pottawatomie
Thomas C. Waldrep	Dem	Pottawatomie
J. H. Reigner	Dem	Pushmataha
Sydney W. Hill	Soc	Roger Mills
A. E. Ball	Dem	Rogers
Luther Harrison	Dem	Seminole
J. N. Davis	Dem	Sequoyah
Henry Sitton	Dem	Stephens
A. North	Dem	Tillman
Washington E. Hudson	Dem	Tulsa
James H. Sykes	Dem	Tulsa
William E. Long	Dem	Wagoner
M. W. Bovee	Dem	Washington
C. C. Hill	Dem	Washita
W. H. Olmstead	Rep	Woods
E. O. McCance	Dem	Woodward

- Table based on government database.
