= Earl Foster Jr. =

American politician

Member of the Oklahoma House of Representatives from the Oklahoma County district
- In office November 1954 – November 1960
- Preceded by: N.E. Reynolds Jr.
- Succeeded by: George C. Keyes

Personal details
- Born: c.1918 Sapulpa, Oklahoma, US
- Died: April 1, 1972 Oklahoma City, Oklahoma, US
- Party: Democratic Party
- Parent: Earl Foster (father)
- Education: University of Oklahoma; George Washington University

Earl Foster Jr. (c. 1918 – April 1, 1972) was an American politician who served in the Oklahoma House of Representatives representing Oklahoma County from 1954 to 1960.

== Biography ==
Earl Foster Jr. was the son of Earl Foster. He attended the University of Oklahoma and George Washington University. Foster served in the Oklahoma House of Representatives as a member of the Democratic Party representing Oklahoma County from 1954 to 1960. He was preceded in office by N.E. Reynolds Jr. and succeeded in office by George C. Keyes.

From 1947 to 1949, Foster was an attorney for the Federal Power Commission and the Securities and Exchange Commission, both in Washington, D.C. He was appointed as an associate municipal judge in Oklahoma City in 1968.

Foster died in Oklahoma City on April 1, 1972, at the age of 54.
