= Paul Nesbitt =

American politician

7th Speaker of the Oklahoma House of Representatives
- In office 1917–1919
- Preceded by: Alonzo McCrory
- Succeeded by: Thomas C. Waldrep

Member of the Oklahoma House of Representatives
- In office 1915–1919

Personal details
- Born: April 3, 1872 Milford, Iowa
- Died: July 22, 1950 (aged 78) Talihina, Oklahoma
- Party: Democratic
- Spouse: Ida May Corber
- Occupation: doctor, newspaperman, politician

Paul Nesbitt (April 3, 1872 – July 22, 1950) was an American politician, who served as Speaker of the Oklahoma House of Representatives. He also served as a secretary for Governor Charles N. Haskell and as a Cabinet member for Governor John C. Walton. Educated at Chicago Medical College, he was a doctor and newspaperman before his entry into Oklahoma politics.

Nesbitt died July 22, 1950, in Talihina, Oklahoma.

== Early life ==
Nesbitt was born April 3, 1872, at Milford, Iowa, the son of James and Evaline Nesbitt. His father was a first lieutenant in the United States Army and his grandfather was an Irish immigrant who served under George Washington in the American Revolutionary War.

Growing up in Nebraska, he was educated at Chicago Medical College and practiced medicine in Vinton, Iowa, El Dorado Springs, Missouri, and finally in Watonga, a town in Oklahoma Territory, in 1899. Nesbitt briefly owned the Watonga Herald. He abandoned his practice in 1904 and went to St. Louis, Missouri, to apprentice as a cub reporter and later worked for the Joplin Globe.

In 1906, he returned to Oklahoma to direct the publicity campaign for the Democratic candidates wanting to serve as delegates to the Oklahoma constitutional convention. He did not support the nomination of Charles N. Haskell in the Democratic primary, but ended up serving as secretary for Oklahoma's first governor. and helped carry the state seal from Guthrie, Oklahoma, to Oklahoma City in 1910.

== Political career ==
Nesbitt represented Pittsburg County in the Oklahoma Legislature during the sessions of the 5th, 6th, and 7th Oklahoma Legislature legislatures.

He supported John C. Walton for governor and served as a Cabinet member under Walton.

== Death ==
Nesbitt died July 22, 1950, in Talihina, Oklahoma, of a cerebral hemorrhage.
