= J. I. Gillespie =

American politician

Member of the Oklahoma House of Representatives from the Tulsa County district
- In office November 16, 1910 – November 16, 1912
- Preceded by: F. L. Haymes
- Succeeded by: Frank Z. Curry (Note: The Tulsa County district was replaced with a top-two district after the 3rd Oklahoma Legislature.); William B. Williams

Personal details
- Died: July 17, 1938 Yates Center, Kansas, U.S.
- Party: Democratic Party

J. I. Gillespie was an American politician who served in the Oklahoma House of Representatives from 1910 to 1912. He was a member of the Democratic Party and represented Tulsa County.

== Biography ==
J. I. Gillespie moved to Tulsa in 1903. He worked in the oil industry and campaigned for the Oklahoma House of Representatives in 1910, defeating Robert Pilgrim in the Democratic Party primary. He defeated P. E. Megee in the general election. He lost his 1912 reelection campaign to Frank Z. Curry. He died in Yates Center, Kansas, on July 17, 1938.
