= Austin Lee Jeffrey =

Oklahoma Supreme Court Commissioner
- In office March 25, 1927 – February 10, 1930
- Preceded by: Position established
- Succeeded by: W. L. Eagleton Jr.

Personal details
- Born: October 14, 1890 Lockhart, Texas, United States
- Died: November 9, 1959 (aged 69) Oklahoma City, Oklahoma, United States
- Education: University of Texas

Austin Lee Jeffrey was an American attorney who served on the Oklahoma Supreme Court Commission from 1927 to 1930.

== Biography ==
Austin Lee Jeffrey was born on October 14, 1890, in Lockhart, Texas, to James Pruitt Jeffrey and Ursula Miley. He attended the Southwestern Teachers College in San Marcus, Texas. He attended the University of Texas and graduated with a law degree in 1916. He served in the United States Army during World War I. After the war he moved to Pawhuska, Oklahoma, and was an assistant attorney for Osage County. He moved to Oklahoma City in 1927 and was appointed to the Oklahoma Supreme Court Commission. He left office in 1930. He also served as the city attorney for Oklahoma City after 1937. He died on November 9, 1959, in Oklahoma City.
