= Gustavus Ramsey =

American politician (1857–1926)

Member of the Oklahoma House of Representatives from the Bryan County district
- In office 1915–1917
- Preceded by: R. R. Halsell
- Succeeded by: Porter Newman

Personal details
- Born: February 24, 1857 Virginia, United States
- Died: November 19, 1926 (aged 69) Sherman, Texas, United States
- Party: Democratic Party

Gustavus A. Ramsey (February 24, 1857 – November 19, 1926) was an American politician who served in the Oklahoma House of Representatives from 1915 to 1917.

== Biography ==
Gustavus Ramsey was born on February 24, 1857, in Virginia to John Z. Ramsey and Judith E. Gilbert. His father was a farmer, merchant, Confederate States of America soldier, and slaveowner. After the American Civil War, his family moved to Texas. In 1885, he moved to Panola County of the Chickasaw Nation where he worked as a farmer and cattle rancher. On December 24, 1891, he married Amanda P. Potts, a Chickasaw citizen, and the couple had one daughter, Mable Ramsey.

A member of the Democratic Party, he was elected to the 5th Oklahoma Legislature representing Bryan County. He served in the Oklahoma House of Representatives from 1915 to 1917. He was preceded in office by R. R. Halsell, and succeeded by Porter Newman. He was a Baptist, Freemason, and Oddfellow. He lived in Colbert, Oklahoma.

He died on November 19, 1926, in Sherman, Texas.
