= Phil D. Brewer =

American politician (1861–1932)

Oklahoma Supreme Court Commissioner
- In office September 11, 1911 – April 1, 1916
- Appointed by: Oklahoma Supreme Court; Robert L. Williams
- Preceded by: Position established
- Succeeded by: Jean P. Day

Oklahoma Superior Court Judge
- In office 1909 – August 1911
- Appointed by: Charles N. Haskell

Member of the Arkansas House of Representatives from the Sebastian County district
- In office 1890–1892

Personal details
- Born: Phil Doddridge Brewer; June 18, 1861 Hackett, Arkansas, U.S.
- Died: August 28, 1932 (aged 71) Oklahoma City, Oklahoma, U.S.
- Party: Democratic Party

Phil D. Brewer was an American politician who served in the Arkansas House of Representatives, as a judge in Oklahoma, and on the Oklahoma Supreme Court Commission.

== Biography ==
Phil Doddridge Brewer was born on June 18, 1861, near Hackett, Arkansas, during the American Civil War to John O. Brewer and Sarah Louisa Brewer. He studied at the country summer schools during his childhood before attending DePauw University for one year. He started teaching at 19 and by 24 he studied law under John S. Little. In 1890, he was elected to one term in the Arkansas House of Representatives representing Sebastian County as a member of the Democratic Party. He moved to Indian Territory in 1895, a year after he married Annie L. Garner. He moved to McAlester, Oklahoma, in 1897 and practiced law until 1909 when Governor Charles Haskell appointed him to the Superior Court. In 1910 he won a 4-year term to the same office, but he resigned in August 1911 to accept an appointment on the Oklahoma Supreme Court Commission. He resigned in 1916 to return to private practice. He died on August 28, 1932, in Oklahoma City.

== Works cited ==
- Thoburn, Joseph B. (1916). History of Oklahoma, Vol. III. p. 951.
- Williams, R. L. (December 1932). "Necrology" (PDF). Chronicles of Oklahoma. 10 (4): 600–603.
