= Napoleon Bonaparte Maxey =

American politician (1853–1930)

Oklahoma Supreme Court Commissioner
- In office March 16, 1923 – December 31, 1926
- Appointed by: Jack C. Walton

Member of the Oklahoma House of Representatives from the Muskogee County district
- In office November 16, 1914 – November 16, 1916

Personal details
- Born: July 15, 1853 Smith County, Tennessee, U.S.
- Died: July 15, 1930 (aged 77)

Napoleon Bonaparte Maxey was an American politician who served in the Oklahoma House of Representatives from 1914 to 1916 and on the Oklahoma Supreme Court Commission from 1923 to 1925.

== Biography ==
Napoleon Bonaparte Maxey was born on July 15, 1853, in Smith County, Tennessee, to Thomas J. Maxey and Mary B. Day. He attended the University of Chicago between 1877 and 1879. He studied law under Judge Monroe C. Crawford in Union County, Illinois, and was admitted to the Illinois Bar in February 1881. He married Augusta C. Miller later that year. He moved to Gainesville, Texas, in 1888 and to Muskogee, Indian Territory, in 1889. He was elected to the Oklahoma House of Representatives during the 5th Oklahoma Legislature as a member of the Democratic Party and served on the Oklahoma Supreme Court Commission between 1923 and 1925. He died on July 15, 1930.
