= Tulsa Benevolent Association =

1920s Oklahoma Ku Klux Klan holding company

The Tulsa Benevolent Association was the holding company of the Oklahoma chapter of the Ku Klux Klan during the 1920s.

== History ==
On January 5, 1922, the Tulsa Benevolent Association was incorporated as the holding company for the Oklahoma chapter of the Ku Klux Klan. The five trustees of the corporation were Washington E. Hudson, John Rogers, C. W. Benedict, "William Shelly" Rogers, and Alf Heggem, and they officed out of the Mayo Building.

In 1923, the organization built Beno Hall, a 3,000 seat and 3-story meeting hall. Beno Hall was intentionally built near the Greenwood District, Tulsa, a largely African American neighborhood in north Tulsa. W. Tate Brady supplied part of the land for Beno Hall. It was colloquially called "Be No Hall," a reference to how there would "Be No Nigger, Jew, Catholic, or Immigrant" at the hall.

The association ceased to exist in 1925 after infighting caused the departure of Washington E. Hudson. Beno Hall was insolvent by 1929, and was sold to the Tulsa County Sheriff's Office. In 1976 Beno Hall was demolished.
