= 6th Oklahoma Legislature =

Leadership
- President of the Senate: Martin Trapp (D)
- President Pro Tem of the Senate: C. W. Board (D)
- Speaker of the House: Paul Nesbitt (D)
- Composition: Senate; 38 5 1 House; 83 26

The Sixth Oklahoma Legislature was a meeting of the legislative branch of the government of Oklahoma, composed of the Oklahoma Senate and the Oklahoma House of Representatives. The state legislature met in Oklahoma City, in regular session from January 2 to March 16, 1917, during the third year of the term of Governor Robert L. Williams.

Lieutenant Governor Martin E. Trapp served as the President of the Senate and C. W. Board served as the President pro tempore of the Oklahoma Senate. Paul Nesbitt served as Speaker of the Oklahoma House of Representatives.

== Dates of sessions ==
- Regular session: January 2-March 16, 1917

Previous: 5th Legislature • Next: 7th Legislature

== Major legislation ==
- Senate Bill 55 prohibited alcohol and made the penalty $500 and six months imprisonment. After it was enacted, the bill was challenged because it failed to exempt liquor distribution for sacramental use in churches and the Oklahoma Supreme Court ruled on May 21, 1918, that the sacramental use of liquor would be exempt. A December ruling said individuals could possess liquor as long as it was not received form a common carrier.

== Party composition ==
=== Senate ===
Affiliation	Party (Shading indicates majority caucus)			Total
Affiliation	Democratic	Republican	Socialist	Total
	38	5	1	44
Voting share	86.4%	11.3%	2.3%	

=== House of Representatives ===
Affiliation	Party (Shading indicates majority caucus)		Total
Affiliation	Democratic	Republican	Total
	83	26	109
Voting share	76.1%	23.9%	

== Leadership ==
=== Senate ===
Lieutenant Governor Martin E. Trapp served as the President of the Senate, which gave him a tie-breaking vote and allowed him to serve as a presiding officer. C.W. Board was elected by state senators to serve as the President pro tempore of the Oklahoma Senate, the primary presiding officer of the Oklahoma Senate.

=== House ===
Paul Nesbitt of McAlester, Oklahoma, served as Speaker of the Oklahoma House of Representatives and Thomas C. Waldrep of Shawnee, Oklahoma, served as Speaker Pro Tempore.

== Members ==
=== Senate ===
District	Name	Party
Lt-Gov	Martin E. Trapp	Dem
1	W. J. Risen	Dem
2	Arthur Leach	Dem
2	G. E. Wilson	Soc
3	W. M. Bickel	Dem
4	George L. Wilson	Dem
5	Harry Cordell	Dem
6	R.L. Knie	Dem
6	O.J. Logan	Dem
7	Walter Ferguson	Rep
8	Eugene Watrous	Rep
9	William Cline	Dem
9	R.L. Hall	Dem
10	Tom Testerman	Rep
11	Clarence Davis	Dem
12	John Golobie	Rep
13	T.B. Hogg	Dem
13	C.L. Edmonson	Dem
14	Robert Burns	Dem
14	W.K. Snyder	Dem
15	Thomas O'Neill	Dem
15	Frank Carpenter	Dem
16	H. Brown	Rep
17	Frank Beauman	Dem
17	J. Elmer Thomas	Dem
18	R.A. Keller	Dem
18	Fred Tucker	Dem
19	Joe Edwards	Dem
19	Jep Knight	Dem
20	J.T. McIntosh	Dem
20	John Hickman	Dem
21	M.M. Ryan	Dem
22	C.W. Board	Dem
23	R.H. Chase	Dem
24	W.C. McAlister	Dem
25	W.V. Buckner	Dem
26	John Vaughan	Dem
27	T.H. Davidson	Dem
27	Eugene Kerr	Dem
28	Thomas LaFayette Rider	Dem
29	O.W. Killam	Dem
30	J.J. Smith	Dem
31	R.L. Davidson	Dem
32	S.L. Johnson	Dem
33	W.A. Chase	Dem

- Table based on state almanac and list of all senators.

=== House of Representatives ===
Name	Party	County
D. B. Collums	Dem	Adair
J. C. Smith	Rep	Alfalfa
James Thurmond	Dem	Atoka
E. L. Adams	Dem	Beaver, Harper
Algernon Mansur	Dem	Beckham
L. A. Everhart	Rep	Blaine
William A. Durant	Dem	Bryan
Porter Newman	Dem	Bryan
Newt Dickinson	Dem	Caddo
S. C. Kelly	Dem	Caddo
John Jack Barker	Dem	Canadian
T. F. Hensley	Dem	Canadian
Thad Baker	Dem	Carter
Roy Shores	Dem	Carter
Roy Hinds	Dem	Cherokee
R. K. Warren	Dem	Choctaw
M. W. Pugh	Dem	Cimarron, Texas
H. O. Miller	Dem	Cleveland
Wilburn Cartwright	Dem	Coal
Lewis Hunter	Dem	Comanche, Cotton
William Powell	Dem	Comanche, Cotton
Fletcher Riley	Dem	Comanche, Cotton
J. H. Butler	Rep	Craig
William Cheatham	Dem	Creek
J. M. Morgan	Dem	Creek
Oscar Houston	Dem	Custer
E. J. Meacham	Dem	Custer
John Gibson	Dem	Delaware
M. L. Jones	Dem	Dewey
Bert Hill	Rep	Ellis
J. B. Campbell	Rep	Garfield
J. A. Eakins	Rep	Garfield
E. O. Northcutt	Dem	Garvin
Alfred Stevenson	Dem	Garvin
Bert Jackson	Dem	Grady
Ed Shegog	Dem	Grady
T. E. Beck	Rep	Grant
J. O. McCollister	Dem	Greer
H. Treadway	Dem	Harmon
J. L. Hendrickson	Dem	Haskell
H. A. Hicks	Dem	Hughes
Silas Shirley	Dem	Hughes
Everett Petry	Dem	Jackson
G. M. Bond	Dem	Jefferson
B. N. Hultzman	Dem	Johnston
Samuel Elder	Rep	Kay
Henry Headley	Rep	Kay
J. A. Marsh	Rep	Kingfisher
R. R. Fitzgerald	Dem	Kiowa
L. P. Bobo	Dem	Latimer
J. B. Harper	Dem	LeFlore
Tom Neal	Dem	LeFlore
Ed Keegan	Rep	Lincoln
W. F. Pardoe	Rep	Lincoln
O. B. Acton	Rep	Logan
Amos Ewing	Rep	Logan
Asa Walden	Dem	Love
S. J. Bardsley	Rep	Major
Sid Wheeler	Dem	Marshall
D. C. Hughes	Dem	Mayes
G.H.A. Thomas	Dem	McClain
G. E. Rowland	Dem	McCurtain
S. S. Mayfield	Dem	McIntosh
R. H. Berry	Dem	McIntosh
James Draughon	Dem	Murray
R. L. Disney	Dem	Muskogee
L. E. Neff	Dem	Muskogee
Robert West	Dem	Muskogee
Roy Harvey	Rep	Noble
A. R. Garrett	Rep	Nowata
W. N. Berry	Dem	Okfuskee
S. S. Butterfield	Dem	Oklahoma
Tom Dolan	Dem	Oklahoma
Rollin Gish	Dem	Oklahoma
I. L. Harris	Rep	Oklahoma
W. W. Robertson	Dem	Oklahoma
H. L. Christopher	Dem	Okmulgee
Bert Hodges	Dem	Okmulgee
L. A. Wismeyer	Rep	Osage
John N. Scott	Dem	Ottawa
Millard Grubb	Rep	Pawnee
A. J. Hartenbower	Dem	Payne
Charles Platt	Rep	Payne
S. J. Fitzgerald	Dem	Pittsburg
Tom Haile	Dem	Pittsburg
Paul Nesbitt	Dem	Pittsburg
J. W. Vaden	Dem	Pontotoc
Robert Wimbish	Dem	Pontotoc
W. L. Chapman	Dem	Pottawatomie
N. A. J. Ticer	Dem	Pottawatomie
Thomas C. Waldrep	Dem	Pottawatomie
C. A. Welch	Dem	Pushmataha
J. T. Nicholson	Dem	Roger Mills
E. E. Woods	Rep	Rogers
A. S. Norvell	Dem	Seminole
M. M. Turlington	Dem	Seminole
J. Blackard Jr.	Dem	Sequoyah
C. B. Johnson	Dem	Sequoyah
J. P. Speer	Dem	Stephens
W. G. Woodard	Dem	Swanson
Squire Humble	Dem	Tillman
Glenn Condon	Rep	Tulsa
Harry H. Rogers	Rep	Tulsa
P. A. Fox	Dem	Wagoner
J. C. Hamilton	Dem	Wagoner
A. E. Craver	Rep	Washington
I. B. Hurst	Dem	Washita
W. H. Olmstead	Rep	Woods
B. H. Beatte	Dem	Woodward

- Table based on government database.
