= C. L. Pinkham =

American politician

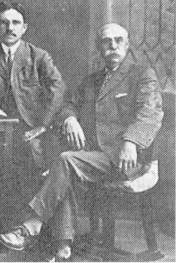
- Pinkham, seated, in 1913

Oklahoma Supreme Court Commissioner
- In office March 16, 1923 – December 31, 1926
- Appointed by: Jack C. Walton

Member of the Oklahoma House of Representatives from the Kay County district
- In office 1913–1917
- Preceded by: T. O. Williams
- Succeeded by: H. W. Headley

Personal details
- Party: Democratic Party

C. L. Pinkham was an American politician who served in the Oklahoma House of Representatives representing Kay County as a Democrat from 1913 to 1917. He later served on the Oklahoma Supreme Court Commission's 5th division from 1923 to 1926. In 1910, he ran in the Democratic primary for Oklahoma's 1st congressional district, placing fourth.
