= Washington E. Hudson =

American politician, Klansman, lawyer (1866–1964)

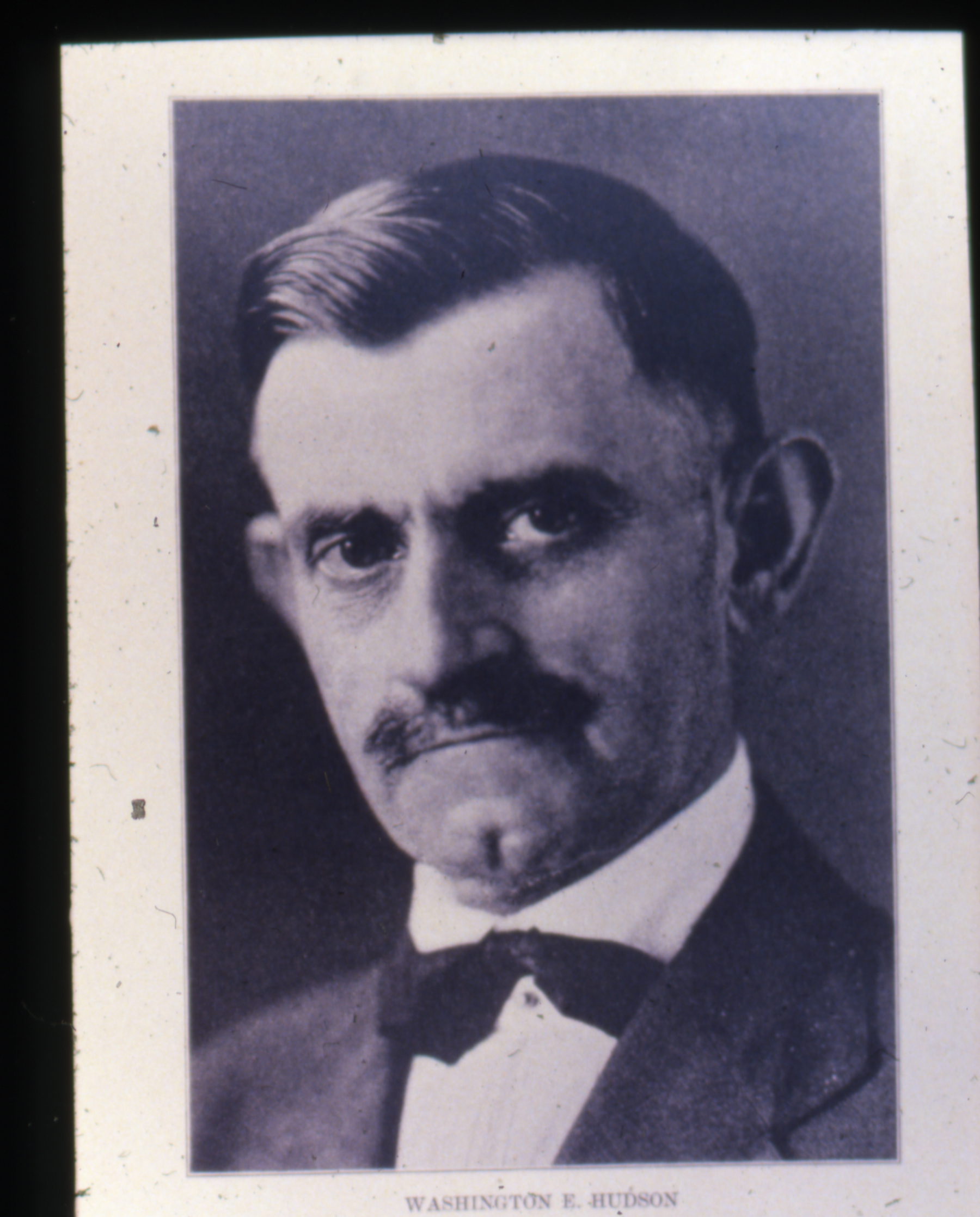
- Hudson in 1921

Grand River Dam Authority board member
- In office 1955–1964

Member of the Oklahoma Senate from the 31st district
- In office November 16, 1922 – November 16, 1926
- Preceded by: R. L. Davidson
- Succeeded by: C. H. Terwilleger

Member of the Oklahoma House of Representatives from the Tulsa County district
- In office November 16, 1914 – November 16, 1916 Serving with James H. Sykes (Note: The Tulsa County district was a top-two district during the 5th Oklahoma Legislature.)
- Preceded by: Frank Z. Curry (Note: The Tulsa County district was a top-two district during the 4th Oklahoma Legislature.); William B. Williams
- Succeeded by: Harry H. Rogers (Note: The Tulsa County district was a top-two district during the 6th Oklahoma Legislature.); Glenn Condon

Personal details
- Born: Washington Elias Hudson; October 8, 1866 Neeley's Bend, Davidson County, Tennessee, U.S.
- Died: January 30, 1964 (aged 97) Tulsa County, Oklahoma, U.S.
- Education: South Kentucky College; Vanderbilt University

Washington Elias Hudson (October 8, 1866 (Note: Sources for Hudson's date of birth vary. Thoburn (1916) lists Hudson's date of birth as October 8, 1868. The date of birth on his tombstone is October 8, 1866.) - January 30, 1964) was an American politician, Ku Klux Klansman, and lawyer who served in the Oklahoma House of Representatives, the Oklahoma Senate, and on the board of the Grand River Dam Authority.

== Early life ==
Washington Elias Hudson was born on October 8, 1866, in Neeley's Bend (Davidson County), Tennessee, to Horatio Hudson and Nannie Hudson. His father died in 1882. He attended the Woolwine Training School in Nashville and graduated from South Kentucky College in 1890. He studied law at Vanderbilt University graduating in 1892. He married Annie Dade on May 8, 1894. He served as an assistant district attorney between 1895 and 1902, when he moved to Lawton in Oklahoma Territory. He briefly moved to Frederick, Oklahoma in 1907 and Tulsa in 1912.

== Oklahoma Legislature ==
In 1914, Hudson was elected to the Oklahoma House of Representatives representing Tulsa County as a member of the Democratic Party. He was a supporter of Governor Robert L. Williams and chaired the oil and gas committee in the house. Hudson helped draw up the impeachment articles for A. P. Watson and served as a prosecutor during his impeachment trial. He helped secure funding for Langston University in 1915.

He served in the Oklahoma Senate between 1923 and 1927. He helped prepare and present the impeachment of Oklahoma Governor Jack C. Walton.

== Founding Oklahoma Ku Klux Klan and University of Tulsa College of Law ==
Hudson served as Dick Rowland's attorney after the Tulsa Race Massacre. On January 5, 1922, the Oklahoma Ku Klux Klan was officially incorporated as the Tulsa Benevolent Association with Hudson as its chairman. Other incorporators included: John Rogers, C. W. Benedict, William “Shelly” Rogers, and Alf G. Heggem. He left the Klan in 1924, but later rejoined.

In 1923, Hudson helped found Tulsa Law School and he served as the law school's first dean until 1943. In 1943, William Rogers incorporated Hudson's school into the University of Tulsa College of Law.

== Lake Hudson, Grand River Dam Authority and death ==
Lake Hudson is named after Hudson. He served on the board of the Grand River Dam Authority from 1955 until his death in 1964.

== Family ==
Hudson's son, Robert D. Hudson, served as a district judge in Tulsa County. The Tulsa-based American Inns of Court chapter was named after Hudson from 1987 until 1995, when his name was dropped from the association due to his Ku Klux Klan ties.

== Works cited ==
- Thoburn, Joseph Bradfield (1916). A Standard History of Oklahoma, Volume III. Oklahoma City: American Historical Society. p. 949-1342.
