= Alonzo McCrory =

American politician

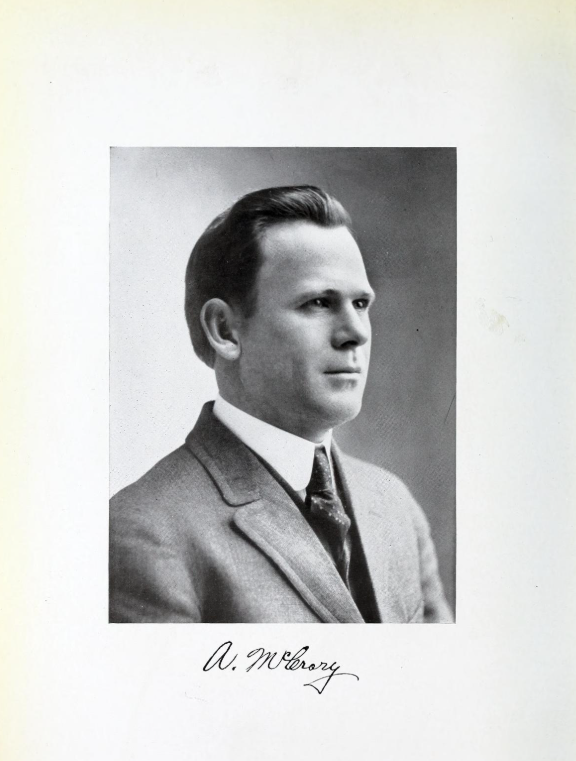
- McCrory in approximately 1916.

6th Speaker of the Oklahoma House of Representatives
- In office 1915–1917
- Preceded by: J. Harvey Maxey Jr.
- Succeeded by: Paul Nesbitt

Member of the Oklahoma House of Representatives from the Jefferson County district
- In office 1913–1917
- Preceded by: Cham Jones
- Succeeded by: G. M. Bond

Personal details
- Born: September 10, 1878 Fayette County, Texas, U.S.
- Died: November 19, 1945 (aged 67)
- Party: Democratic Party

Alonzo McCrory (September 10, 1878 – November 19, 1945) was an American politician who served as the 6th Speaker of the Oklahoma House of Representatives from 1915 to 1917. A member of the Democratic Party, he represented Jefferson County in the Oklahoma House of Representatives from 1913 to 1917.

== Biography ==
Alonzo McCrory was born on September 10, 1878, in Fayette County, Texas, to A. S. McCrory and Clara Wier. His father was a Confederate soldier from Tennessee and his mother was from Mississippi. He attended public schools and Baylor University, but did not graduate. In 1903 he moved to Durant, Oklahoma, and started manufacturing soda water. He worked in the mercantile business from 1904 to 1909 in Comanche and Cornish. In 1909, he founded the Cornish News in Cornish, Oklahoma. In May 1914 he moved his paper to Ringling, Oklahoma, and changed the name to Ringling News. He was elected to the Oklahoma House of Representatives representing Jefferson County in 1912 and served in the legislature from 1913 to 1917 as a member of the Democratic Party. From 1915 to 1917, he served as the 6th Speaker of the Oklahoma House of Representatives. He was elected Speaker in 1915 with 76 votes, over the Republican nominee Jesse B. Norton, who received 16 votes, and the Socialist nominee N. D. Pritchett, who received 5 votes. He married Una B. Cochran on July 26, 1902.
