= Oklahoma Supreme Court Commission =

- Established: 1911; 1923; 1954
- Dissolved: November 30, 1918; December 31, 1930; April 1, 1959
- Location: Oklahoma
- Judge term length: 2 years
- Number of positions: Three to fifteen
- Type of tribunal: Judicial commission

The Oklahoma Supreme Court Commission was a judicial commission in Oklahoma created by the Oklahoma Legislature to assist the Oklahoma Supreme Court with its caseload. The commission was active between 1911–1918, 1923–1930, and 1954–1959 and subordinate to the Oklahoma Supreme Court. The number of members varied over time, from three to fifteen. Members would adjudicate cases and write opinions with the final drafts and decisions requiring the approval of the Supreme Court.

== Background ==
The Oklahoma Supreme Court Commission was authorized by the Oklahoma Legislature by statute subject to sunset provisions. The commission was created as an alternative to creating a new appellate court. The first Oklahoma Supreme Court Commission was created in 1911 with six members and was set to expire in 1913. In 1913, the legislature extended the commission until February 1, 1915. In 1915 the commission was extended again for two more years and expanded to nine members. In 1917, it was extended until November 30, 1918. The commission was reauthorized in 1923 through December 1926. In 1927, it was extended again until 1930. In 1954, the Oklahoma Bar Association recommended the creation of a permanent seven-member Supreme Court Commission, but the proposal was rejected by the Oklahoma Legislature, who instead opted to create a temporary commission. The final Oklahoma Supreme Court Commission was authorized in 1955 through 1959.

== Timeline of authorization ==
- 1911– Legislation passed authorizing the commission until 1913. The legislation provided for six commissioners (one from each of the state's five judicial districts and one at-large) who were appointed by the Oklahoma Supreme Court. Commissioners were organized by the Supreme Court into two 'divisions' made up of three commissioners and served a two-year term.
- 1913– Legislation passed authorizing the commission until 1915.
- 1915– Legislation passed authorizing the commission until January 31, 1917. The legislation increased the number of commissioners to nine (one from each of the state's five judicial districts and four at-large) who were appointed by the Governor of Oklahoma subject to the consent and approval of the Oklahoma Supreme Court. Commissioners were organized by the Supreme Court into three 'divisions' made up of three commissioners and served two-year terms. Commissioners were required to meet the same requirements as Supreme Court Justices in the Oklahoma Constitution or be district judges in the state. Commissioners could be removed from office by the Governor at his discretion. This legislation also specifically authorized the commission to assist the Supreme Court with hearing cases and writing opinions.
- 1917– Legislation passed authorizing the commission until November 30, 1918. The only change was the removal power was moved from the Governor to the Legislature through impeachment.
- 1923– Legislation passed re-authorizing the commission until December 31, 1926. The legislation increased the number of commissioners to fifteen who were appointed by the Governor of Oklahoma subject to the consent and approval of the Oklahoma Supreme Court. Commissioners could be removed from office at the discretion of the Supreme Court.
- 1927– Legislation passed authorizing the commission until December 31, 1930. The number of commissioners was decreased back to nine and they were organized into two divisions.
- 1955– Legislation passed authorizing the commission until April 1, 1959. The legislation provided for three commissioners. Commissioners were appointed by the Governor of Oklahoma subject to the consent and approval of the Oklahoma Supreme Court and could be removed from office by the Supreme Court at its discretion.

== Membership ==
The following commissioners were appointed to the first commission by the Oklahoma Supreme Court:

Division 1

- C. B. Ames, served September 11, 1911 to March 1, 1913.
- J. F. Sharp, served September 11, 1911 to December 31, 1915.
- James B. A. Robertson, served September 11, 1911, to February 1, 1914.
- Charles M. Thacker, served March 19, 1913 to December 31, 1915.
- George Rittenhouse, served February 2, 1914 to December 31, 1915.

Division 2

- Phil D. Brewer, served September 11, 1911, to December 31, 1915.
- J. B. Harrison, served September 11, 1911, to September 11, 1915.
- Malcolm E. Rosser, served September 11, 1911, to September 1, 1915.
- C. L. Moore, served January 11, 1915, to December 31, 1915.
- C. A. Galbraith, served September 1, 1915 to December 31, 1915.

The following commissioners were appointed to the second commission by Governor of Oklahoma:

Division 1

- Charles M. Thacker, served April 1, 1915, to November 2, 1915.
- William A. Collier, served April 1, 1915, to January 31, 1917.
- Phil D. Brewer, served April 1, 1915, to April 1, 1916.
- Nestor Rummons, served November 2, 1915, to January 31, 1917.
- Jean P. Day, served April 1, 1916, to October 24, 1916.
- A. M. Stewart, served October 24, 1916, to January 31, 1917.

Division 2

- C. A. Galbraith, served April 1, 1915, to January 31, 1917.
- John Devereux, served April 1, 1915, to January 5, 1916.
- Sam Hooker, served January 5, 1916, to February 15, 1916.
- Frank Burford, served February 15, 1916, to January 31, 1917.
- Rutherford Brett, served April 1, 1915, to June 1, 1916.
- D. D. Brunson, served June 7, 1916 to January 31, 1917.

Division 3

- George Rittenhouse, served April 1, 1915, to September 19, 1916.
- W. R. Bleakmore, served April 1, 1915, to January 31, 1917.
- J. B. Dudley, served April 1, 1915, to February 15, 1916.
- Hunter L. Johnson, served September 19, 1916, to January 31, 1917.
- Sam Hooker, served February 15, 1916, to January 31, 1917.

The following commissioners were appointed to the third commission by Governor of Oklahoma:

Division 1

- Nestor Rummons, served March 31, 1917, to November 30, 1918.
- A. M. Stewart, served March 31, 1917, to November 30, 1918.
- William A. Collier, served March 31, 1917, to November 30, 1918.

Division 2

- D. K. Pope, served April 31, 1917, to November 30, 1918.
- A. T. West, served March 31, 1917, to June 1, 1918.
- H. S. Davis, served June 11, 1918 to November 30, 1918.
- C. A. Galbraith, served March 31, 1917, to November 30, 1918.

Division 3

- W. V. Pryor, served April 23, 1917, to November 30, 1918.
- W. R. Bleakmore, served March 31, 1917, to February 16, 1918.
- J. M. Springer, served February 26, 1918, to November 30, 1918.
- Sam Hooker, served March 31, 1917, to November 30, 1918.

The following commissioners were appointed to the fourth commission by the Governor of Oklahoma:

Division 1

- Napoleon Bonaparte Maxey, served March 16, 1923, to December 31, 1926.
- B. C. Logsdon, served March 16, 1923, to December 31, 1926.
- Robert Ray, served March 16, 1923, to December 31, 1926.

Division 2

- J. S. Estes, served March 16, 1923, to December 31, 1926.
- J. H. Jarman, served March 16, 1923, to December 31, 1926.
- Thomas D. Lyons, served March 16, 1923, to November 28, 1925.
- William B. Williams, served November 28, 1925, to December 31, 1926.

Division 3

- C. M. Threadgill, served March 16, 1923, to December 31, 1926.
- Charles H. Ruth, served March 16, 1923, to December 31, 1926.
- Cham Jones, served March 16, 1923, to December 31, 1926.

Division 4

- A. S. Dickson, served March 16, 1923, to December 31, 1926.
- J. S. Shackelford, served March 16, 1923, to December 31, 1926.
- R. E. Stephenson, served March 16, 1923, to December 31, 1926.

Division 5

- William P. Thompson, served March 16, 1923, to December 31, 1926.
- William E. Foster, served March 16, 1923, to December 31, 1926.
- C. L. Pinkham, served March 16, 1923, to December 31, 1926.

The following commissioners were appointed to the fifth commission by the Governor of Oklahoma:

Division 1

- Crawford D. Bennett, served March 25, 1927, to December 31, 1930.
- Houston B. Teehee, served March 25, 1927, to December 31, 1930.
- L. V. Reid, served March 25, 1927, to December 31, 1930.
- Arthur Leach, served March 25, 1927, to December 31, 1930.
- Dudley Monk, served March 25, 1927, to June 28, 1927.
- Earl Foster, served June 28, 1927, to September 10, 1930.

Division 2

- J. A. Diffendaffer, served March 25, 1927, to December 31, 1930.
- A. L. Herr, served March 25, 1927, to December 31, 1930.
- Austin Lee Jeffrey, served March 25, 1927, to February 10, 1930.
- W. L. Eagleton Jr., served February 13, 1930, to December 31, 1930.
- W. C. Hall, served March 25, 1927, to December 31, 1930.

The following commissioners were appointed to the sixth commission by the Governor of Oklahoma:

- J. W. Crawford, served June 3, 1955, to July 7, 1957.
- James H. Nease, served June 3, 1955, to April 1, 1959.
- Jean R. Reed, served April 30, 1957, to April 1, 1959.

== Historical legacy ==
Scholarship in the late 1990s noted the lack of recent scholarship into Supreme Court Commissions in the United States and their unique function has been described as quasi-judicial.
