= John Bunyan Phillips =

American politician (1871-1943)

Member of the Oklahoma House of Representatives from the Cleveland County district
- In office 1922–1924
- Preceded by: Ralph C. Hardie
- Succeeded by: E. V. George
- In office 1918–1920
- Preceded by: H. O. Miller
- Succeeded by: Ralph C. Hardie

Personal details
- Born: September 5, 1871 Odessa, Missouri, U.S.
- Died: April 6, 1943 (aged 71) Oklahoma City, Oklahoma, U.S.
- Party: Democratic Party

John Bunyan Phillips was an American politician who served in the Oklahoma House of Representatives representing Cleveland County from 1918 to 1920 and from 1922 to 1924.

== Biography ==
John Bunyan Phillips was born on September 5, 1871, near Odessa, Missouri. In 1890, he moved to Oklahoma Territory, and on January 9, 1898, he married Claudia Beryl Hess. He was a farmer, rancher, and contractor.

Phillips served in the Oklahoma House of Representatives as a member of the Democratic Party representing Cleveland County from 1918 to 1920 and from 1922 to 1924. In his first term, he was preceded in office by Democrat H. O. Miller and succeeded in office by Republican Ralph C. Hardie. In his second term, he was preceded in office by Hardie and succeeded in office by E. V. George. While in the legislature, he supported the impeachment of Governor Jack Walton. He died on April 6, 1943, in Oklahoma City.
