= John H. Burford =

American judge (1852–1922)

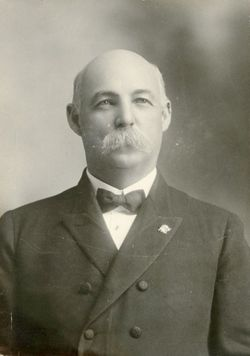

Member of the Oklahoma Senate from the 12th district
- In office 1912–1916
- Preceded by: Ben F. Berkey
- Succeeded by: John Golobie

Personal details
- Born: February 29, 1852 Parke County, Indiana, US
- Died: September 2, 1922 (aged 70) Long Beach, California, US
- Occupation: Attorney, Justice of the Oklahoma Territorial Supreme Court
- Known for: Last Chief Justice of the Oklahoma Territorial Supreme Court

John H. Burford (February 29, 1852 – September 2, 1922) was an American judge who served as justice of the Territorial Oklahoma Supreme Court from 1892 to 1906, serving as the final Chief Justice of that court from 1898 to 1903. After the territorial supreme court was dissolved at statehood, Burford served as City Attorney for Guthrie, Oklahoma, where he had made his home. He was the Republican Party nominee for U. S. Senator in 1914, but lost the election.

== Ancestry and early life ==
John H. Burford was born in Parke County, Indiana on February 29, 1852. His father was Reverend James Burford, a Baptist minister in Indiana, who had various ministries in that state, and where he lived out the rest of his life. The Burford ancestral background was English, Scottish and Welsh; the original immigrant, Elijah Hastings Burford, came from Oxfordshire County, England to Amherst County, Virginia in 1713.

John Burford got nearly all his formal education in Indiana, and graduated from the Indiana University (from what is now Maurer School of Law) with a Bachelor of Laws degree in 1874. After graduation, he went to work for Judge D. V. Burns in Indianapolis, as both a student and assistant. Some time later, he moved to Crawfordsville, Indiana, where he opened an independent law office. He also served two terms as prosecutor in the 22nd Judicial Court of Indiana. Becoming active in Republican Party politics, and a member of the state central committee in 1888, he strongly supported Benjamin Harrison's campaign for the President of the United States. Before moving to Crawfordsville, he married Mary A. Cheek at Indianapolis on February 14, 1876. (Note: John and Mary had one son, who became a successful attorney in Bartlesville, Oklahoma.)

Three years after settling in Crawfordville, Burford was elected prosecuting attorney for the 22nd Circuit. He won several high-profile cases, including one in which the defendant was found guilty of murder and hanged – the first legal hanging in the county. Subsequently, he was chosen as chairman of the Republican Party Central Committee for Indiana, which secured the election of Benjamin Harrison as President of the U.S. in 1888. He remained a friend of Harrison until the president died.

Burford left Indiana and came to Oklahoma Territory in 1890, where the first governor offered him the job of Probate Judge for Beaver County. After staying there for two days, he resigned the probate job and traveled to Oklahoma City. He was soon appointed as registrar of the Land Office by President Harrison. The offer appealed to him, and he snapped up the opportunity to serve in this job. He remained until 1892, when Justice A. J. Seay resigned from the Supreme Court to replace George W. Steele, who had just resigned as Governor of Oklahoma. Burford was also assigned as chief judge of the 2nd District, and found it necessary to move to El Reno. (Note: The 2nd District included all of Oklahoma Territory west of Oklahoma and Logan counties, with El Reno designated as the district headquarters.) He remained in this position for nearly four and a half years, earning widespread respect even from men who disagreed with him politically. Notably, he was the only appointee of a Republican president who was allowed to serve out his full term when Democrat Grover Cleveland succeeded Republican Benjamin Harrison as president. In June 1896, Burford was succeeded by John C. Tarsney, of Kansas City, Missouri.

== Oklahoma Territory ==
Burford moved to the newly created Oklahoma Territory in 1890, where he settled in Beaver County in the Oklahoma Panhandle, previously known as "No Man's Land". The first Governor of Oklahoma Territory, George W. Steele appointed Burford as the first Probate Judge in Beaver County. He only stayed two days before he resigned and moved to Oklahoma City, where President Harrison appointed him as Registrar of the Land Office. He remained in the Land Office until March 1892, when President Harrison appointed him as Associate Justice of the Territorial Supreme Court, replacing Abram J. Seay, who had already accepted the position of Territorial Governor, succeeding former Governor Steele. Once on the court, Burford was assigned to the Second District, which required him to move to El Reno. (Note: The Second Judicial District included Blaine, Canadian, Garfield, Kingfisher and Washita Counties in Oklahoma.) Burford continued in this position even after Grover Cleveland was elected president, thus serving four years and four months on the court. When his full term had expired, he was succeeded on the Supreme Court by John C. Tarsney of Kansas City. Burford went back to private law practice in El Reno.

=== Chief Justice of Territorial Supreme Court ===
President William McKinley appointed Burford as Chief Justice of the Oklahoma Territorial Supreme Court on February 16, 1898. (Note: This appointment required Burford to move his residence from El Reno to Guthrie, the Territorial capital.) His reappointment would continue under President Theodore Roosevelt, in effect making him the final Chief Justice, since the Territorial Government was dissolved when Oklahoma was proclaimed a state on November 16, 1907. During his tenure, Burford not only performed his ordinary duties, but greatly influenced the system of jurisprudence that would be practiced after statehood.

Burford's accomplishments as Chief Justice were:

- Published 13 volumes of Supreme Court reports;
- Eliminated Territorial Library indebtedness of $5,000, and increased its collection to 15,000 volumes. (Note: The Territorial Chief Justice also served as chairman of the Territorial Library board of trustees.)

=== Post-statehood activities ===
Burford continued to reside in Guthrie for several years after statehood. He represented the citizens of Guthrie in all the litigations that resulted from moving the state capital from Guthrie to Oklahoma City. He was elected president of the State Bar Association in 1912–13. In 1912, he was elected to a 4-year term in the state senate. He continued in the leadership of the state Republican Party, which rewarded him by making him their unanimous choice candidate for the office of U. S. Senator in 1914. He, along with the complete Republican slate, lost that election.

== Death and burial ==
John H. Burford died in Long Beach, California on September 2, 1922. His body was shipped to Oklahoma City, where he was buried in Rose Hill Burial Park, after a service at the First Methodist Church.

== Notes ==
Party political offices
First	Republican nominee for United States Senator from Oklahoma (Class 3); 1914	Succeeded by John W. Harreld
