= 8th Oklahoma Legislature =

Leadership
- President of the Senate: Martin Trapp (D)
- President Pro Tem of the Senate: T. C. Simpson (D)
- Speaker of the House: George B. Schwabe (R)
- Composition: Senate; 27 17; House; 73 36

The Eighth Oklahoma Legislature was a meeting of the legislative branch of the government of Oklahoma, composed of the Oklahoma Senate and the Oklahoma House of Representatives. The state legislature met in Oklahoma City, in regular session from January 4 to April 2, 1921, and in special session from April 25 to May 21, 1921, during the third year of the term of Governor James B.A. Robertson. It was the first time, Republicans took control of the Oklahoma House of Representatives. In 1920, Bessie McColgin, a Republican, became the first woman elected to the Oklahoma House of Representatives. Lamar Looney, Oklahoma's first female state senator and a Democrat, was also elected in 1920.

Impeachment charges were brought against lieutenant governor in the Oklahoma House of Representatives, but not sustained by the state senate.

T. C. Simpson served as the President pro tempore of the Oklahoma Senate and George Blaine Schwabe served as the Speaker of the Oklahoma House of Representatives.

== Dates of sessions ==
- Regular session: January 4-April 2, 1921
- Special session: April 25-May 21, 1921

Previous: 7th Legislature • Next: 9th Legislature

== Major events ==
- on Republicans held the majority of seats in the Oklahoma House of Representatives for the first time in state history, allowing them to select the chamber's leaders.
- The first female state legislators in Oklahoma served in the 1921 session.
- The Republican-dominated House brought impeachment charges against Lieutenant Governor Martin Trapp and narrowly failed to approve impeachment charges against both the state treasurer and Oklahoma Governor James Robertson. The Democratic-dominated Senate did not sustain the impeachment charges against Trapp.

== Party composition ==
=== Senate ===
| Affiliation | Party (Shading indicates majority caucus) | | Total |
| Affiliation | Democratic | Republican | Total |
|---|---|---|---|
| | 27 | 17 | 44 |
| Voting share | 61.4% | 38.6% | |

=== House of Representatives ===
| Affiliation | Party (Shading indicates majority caucus) | | Total |
| Affiliation | Republican | Democratic | Total |
|---|---|---|---|
| | 73 | 36 | 109 |
| Voting share | 67% | 33% | |

== Leadership ==
T. C. Simpson of Thomas, Oklahoma, served as President pro tempore of the Oklahoma Senate in 1921. George B. Schwabe was Speaker of the Oklahoma House of Representatives.

== Members ==
=== Senate ===
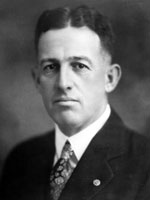
State Senator William J. Holloway would go on to become an Oklahoma governor.

| District | Name | Party |
|---|---|---|
| Lt Gov | Martin E. Trapp | Dem |
| 1 | M. W. Pugh | Dem |
| 2 | C. B. Leedy | Rep |
| 2 | James Spurlock | Dem |
| 3 | William Briggs | Rep |
| 4 | Mrs. Lamar Looney | Dem |
| 5 | Harry Cordell | Dem |
| 6 | James Land | Rep |
| 6 | T. C. Simpson | Dem |
| 7 | Joe Sherman | Rep |
| 8 | Harry Glasser | Rep |
| 9 | W. T. Clark | Rep |
| 10 | Roy Harvey | Rep |
| 11 | M. F. Ingraham | Rep |
| 12 | John Golobie | Rep |
| 13 | Charles Wells | Rep |
| 13 | M. W. Lynch | Rep |
| 14 | T. F. Hensley | Dem |
| 14 | Ross Lillard | Dem |
| 15 | C. A. Dearmon | Dem |
| 15 | L. L. West | Dem |
| 16 | H. Brown | Rep |
| 17 | L. A. Morton | Dem |
| 17 | Jed Johnson | Dem |
| 18 | James Draughon | Dem |
| 18 | John Carlock | Dem |
| 19 | William Robert Wallace | Dem |
| 19 | W. H. Woods | Dem |
| 20 | C. E. McPherren | Dem |
| 20 | Wilburn Cartwright | Dem |
| 21 | J. E. Fleming | Dem |
| 22 | Tom Anglin | Dem |
| 23 | Luther Harrison | Dem |
| 24 | William J. Holloway | Dem |
| 25 | E. P. Hill | Dem |
| 26 | Joe Ratliff | Dem |
| 27 | Clark Nichols | Dem |
| 27 | Samuel Morton Rutherford | Dem |
| 28 | E. M. Frye | Rep |
| 29 | Pete Coyne | Dem |
| 30 | Horace Durant | Rep |
| 31 | R. L. Davidson | Dem |
| 32 | Glen Horner | Rep |
| 33 | E. E. Woods | Rep |
| 34 | J. Corbett Cornett | Rep |

- Table based on state almanac.

=== House of Representatives ===
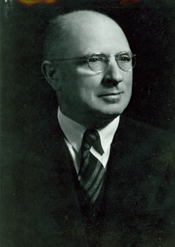
George B. Schwabe was Oklahoma's first Republican Speaker of the House.

| Name | Party | County |
|---|---|---|
| W. A. Scofield | Rep | Adair |
| Leslie Salter | Rep | Alfalfa |
| F. C. Johnson | Dem | Atoka |
| J. W. Steffen | Rep | Beaver, Harper |
| W. A. Hornbeck | Dem | Beckham |
| L. A. Everhart | Rep | Blaine |
| Porter Newman | Dem | Bryan |
| J. B. Smith | Dem | Bryan |
| T. F. Cummings | Rep | Caddo |
| T. C. Ottinger | Rep | Caddo |
| J. L. Trevathan Thompson | Rep | Canadian |
| D. S. Hoover | Dem | Carter |
| Bruce Keenan | Rep | Cherokee |
| D. A. Stovall | Dem | Choctaw |
| John Q. Denny | Rep | Cimarron, Texas |
| Ralph Hardie | Rep | Cleveland |
| Austin Rice | Rep | Coal |
| Thornton Clark | Rep | Comanche |
| Leroy Elmore | Dem | Cotton |
| P. Z. Newman | Rep | Craig |
| Eli Admire | Rep | Creek |
| W. D. Crane | Rep | Custer |
| James Butler | Rep | Delaware |
| Otto Smith | Rep | Dewey |
| G. E. Davison | Rep | Ellis |
| J. B. Campbell | Rep | Garfield |
| L. G. Gossett | Rep | Garfield |
| J. S. Garrison | Dem | Garvin |
| A. L. Davis | Dem | Grady |
| M. B. Louthan | Dem | Grady |
| T. E. Beck | Rep | Grant |
| Horace Simpson | Dem | Greer |
| L. A. Pearson | Dem | Harmon |
| John Ogle | Rep | Haskell |
| Ben F. Harrison | Dem | Hughes |
| Ed Dabney | Dem | Jackson |
| J. M Roberson | Dem | Jefferson |
| Hugh Jones | Dem | Johnston |
| F. A. Heberling | Rep | Kay |
| W. P. Kimerer | Rep | Kingfisher |
| S. D. Bailey | Rep | Kiowa |
| George Mitchell | Rep | Kiowa |
| Arthur Smallwood | Rep | Latimer |
| Sam Neely | Dem | LeFlore |
| J. T. White | Rep | LeFlore |
| B. Taylor | Rep | Lincoln |
| M. M. Watson | Rep | Lincoln |
| William Dodd | Rep | Logan |
| E. G. Sharp | Rep | Logan |
| J. C. Graham | Dem | Love |
| Roy Harp | Rep | Major |
| Marvin Shilling | Dem | Marshall |
| Will Crockett | Rep | Mayes |
| Murray Gibbons | Dem | McClain |
| James Dyer Jr. | Dem | McCurtain |
| Charles Whitaker | Dem | McIntosh |
| Jess Pullen | Dem | Murray |
| Wesley E. Disney | Dem | Muskogee |
| Perry Miller | Dem | Muskogee |
| J. F. Strayhorn | Dem | Muskogee |
| H. E. Keim | Rep | Noble |
| George B. Schwabe | Rep | Nowata |
| T. W. Harman | Rep | Okfuskee |
| Thomas Gorman | Dem | Oklahoma |
| I. L. Harris | Rep | Oklahoma |
| John Jerkins | Dem | Oklahoma |
| W. W. Robertson | Dem | Oklahoma |
| Clarence Tylee | Rep | Okmulgee |
| L. A. Wismeyer | Rep | Osage |
| James Miller | Rep | Ottawa |
| W. S. Caldwell | Rep | Pawnee |
| Charles Platt | Rep | Payne |
| Charles Brice | Dem | Pittsburg |
| R. H. Matthews | Rep | Pittsburg |
| W. O. Pratt | Dem | Pittsburg |
| C. A. Knight | Dem | Pontotoc |
| W. S. Pendleton | Dem | Pottawatomie |
| Victor Locke Jr. | Rep | Pushmataha |
| Bessie McColgin | Rep | Roger Mills |
| Harry Jennings | Rep | Rogers |
| D. O. Jennings | Rep | Seminole |
| R. A. Balance | Rep | Sequoyah |
| James C. Nance | Dem | Stephens |
| H. R. King | Dem | Tillman |
| Bailey E. Bell | Rep | Tulsa |
| Remington Rogers | Rep | Tulsa |
| W. T. Drake | Rep | Wagoner |
| A. E. Craver | Rep | Washington |
| W. T. Graves | Dem | Washita |
| E. A. Herod | Rep | Woods |
| Jerry Coover | Rep | Woodward |

- Table based on government database.
