= Thomas C. Waldrep =

American politician (1889–1959)

Member of the Oklahoma Senate from the 13th district
- In office 1933–1941
- Preceded by: Clarence Johnson
- Succeeded by: Mead Norton
- In office 1925–1929
- Preceded by: Chas. E. Wells
- Succeeded by: Clarence Johnson

8th Speaker of the Oklahoma House of Representatives
- In office 1919–1921
- Preceded by: Paul Nesbitt
- Succeeded by: George B. Schwabe

Member of the Oklahoma House of Representatives from the Pottawatomie County district
- In office 1915–1921
- Preceded by: James T. Farrall
- Succeeded by: C. A. Knight

Personal details
- Born: February 16, 1889 Moulton, Alabama, U.S.
- Died: October 7, 1959 (aged 70) Oklahoma City, Oklahoma, U.S.
- Party: Democratic
- Education: University of Oklahoma

Thomas C. Waldrep (February 16, 1889 – October 7, 1959) was an American politician who served as the 8th Speaker of the Oklahoma House of Representatives.

== Biography ==
Thomas C. Waldrep was born on February 16, 1889, in Moulton, Alabama. He moved with his family to present-day Oklahoma in 1898. He was an attorney, Methodist, and a graduate of the University of Oklahoma. He was elected to the Oklahoma House of Representatives representing Pottawatomie County as a Democrat in 1914 and served in the house from 1915 to 1921. He served as the 8th Speaker of the Oklahoma House of Representatives from 1919 to 1921. From 1925 to 1929 and 1933 to 1941, he represented the 13th district of the Oklahoma Senate. He died on October 7, 1959, in Oklahoma City.
