= John Jack Barker =

American politician (1852–1927)

Member of the Oklahoma Senate from the 14th district
- In office 1923–1927
- Preceded by: Ross N. Lillard
- Succeeded by: John L. Rice

Member of the Oklahoma House of Representatives from the Canadian County district
- In office 1917–1921
- Preceded by: T. F. Hensley
- Succeeded by: J. L. Trevathan

Personal details
- Born: October 22, 1852 Mendota, Virginia, United States
- Died: November 11, 1927 (aged 75) El Reno, Oklahoma, United States
- Party: Democratic Party

John "Jack" Barker (October 22, 1852 – November 11, 1927) was an American politician who served in the Oklahoma House of Representatives and Oklahoma Senate.

== Biography ==
John M. "Jack" Barker was born on October 22, 1852, in Mendota, Virginia, to Edmund Barker and Sarah Wood. He moved to Illinois and Missouri before settling in Oklahoma Territory near El Reno in 1891. In 1875, he married Frances Farrell and the couple had three daughters. He served on several school boards in Oklahoma over sixteen years.

Barker was elected as a member of the Democratic Party representing the Canadian County district of the Oklahoma House of Representatives from 1917 to 1921. He later represented the 14th district of the Oklahoma Senate from 1923 to 1927. He later served as the vice president of the Oklahoma Farmers' Union. He died on November 11, 1927, in El Reno.
