= John Golobie =

American politician from Oklahoma

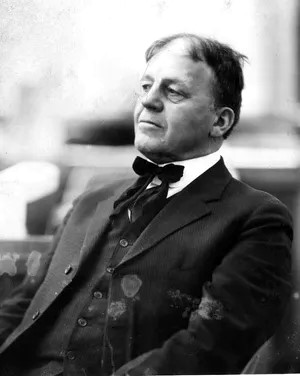

Member of the Oklahoma Senate from the 12th district
- In office November 16, 1916 – November 16, 1924
- Preceded by: John H. Burford
- Succeeded by: Joe Shearer

Personal details
- Born: Austro-Hungarian Empire
- Died: May 30, 1927 Oklahoma, U.S.
- Party: Republican

John Golobie was an American politician who served in the Oklahoma Senate between 1916 and 1924. Before his election, he immigrated from Europe and worked as a journalist. After settling in Guthrie in 1889, he later became the editor of the Oklahoma State Register in 1907.

== Biography ==
John Golobie was born in either Czecho-Slovakia or Yugoslavia (likely in the then Austro-Hungarian Empire). Golobie immigrated to the United States and later settled in Kansas writing for the Wichita Eagle. In 1889, he participated in a land run and settled in Guthrie. He took over as editor of the Oklahoma State Register in 1907. He ran in the 1910 United States House of Representatives elections in Oklahoma for the 1st district, but lost the Republican primary. He was elected to the Oklahoma Senate in 1916 and served until 1924. Golobie was instrumental in making mistletoe the state floral emblem of Oklahoma. He died on May 30, 1927.

== Electoral history ==
1910 Oklahoma's 1st congressional district Republican primary (August 2, 1910)
Party	Candidate	Votes	%
Republican	Bird Segle McGuire (incumbent)	9,042	54.4%
Republican	Milton C. Garber	6,412	38.6%
Republican	John Golobie	1,145	6.8%
Turnout		16,599	
