= 2nd Oklahoma Legislature =

Meeting of the legiative branch of the government of Oklahoma

Leadership
- President of the Senate: George W. Bellamy (D)
- President Pro Tem of the Senate: J. C. Graham (D)
- Speaker of the House: Ben Wilson (D)
- Composition: Senate; 34 10; House; 70 39

The Second Oklahoma Legislature was a meeting of the legislative branch of the government of Oklahoma, composed of the Oklahoma Senate and the Oklahoma House of Representatives, during the only term of Governor Charles Haskell. State legislators elected in 1908 met in the Guthrie City Hall Building from January 5 to March 12, 1909. The state legislature also met in special session from January 20 to March 19, 1910.

Oklahoma's first black state legislator, A. C. Hamlin, was among the new group of state legislators, but was limited to one term by a Jim Crow law passed by the legislature.

== Dates of sessions ==
- Regular session: January 5-March 12, 1909
- Special session: January 20-March 19, 1910

Previous: 1st Legislature • Next: 3rd Legislature

== Major legislation ==
- Legislation enacted on March 6, 1909, created the Southeastern Normal School, which would later become Southeastern Oklahoma State University. Initially offering four years of high school and junior college, the school opened its doors to students on June 14, 1909.

== Party composition ==
=== Senate ===
Affiliation	Party (Shading indicates majority caucus)		Total
Affiliation	Democratic	Republican	Total
	34	10	44
Voting share	77.3%	22.7%	

=== House of Representatives ===
Affiliation	Party (Shading indicates majority caucus)		Total
Affiliation	Democratic	Republican	Total
	70	39	109
Voting share	64.2%	35.8%	

== Leadership ==
=== Senate ===
Lieutenant Governor George W. Bellamy continued to serve as the first President of the Senate, which gave him a tie-breaking vote and allowed him to serve as a presiding officer. J. C. Graham was elected as the second President pro tempore of the Oklahoma Senate, giving him the authority to organize the state senate and serve as a presiding officer.

=== House ===
Ben Wilson served as the second Speaker of the Oklahoma House of Representatives. He hailed from a town known as Cereal, which today is known as Banner, Oklahoma. Ben F. Harrison, of Calvin, served as Speaker Pro Tempore.

== Members ==
=== Senate ===
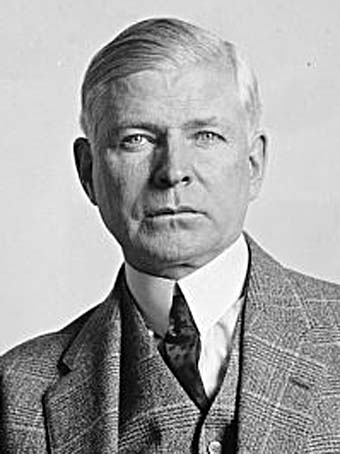
State Senator Elmer Thomas would go on to serve as a United States Senator.

District	Name	Party
Lt-Gov	George W. Bellamy	Dem
1	Joe S. Morris	Dem
2	E. L. Mitchell	Dem
2	R. E. Echols	Dem
3	A. G. Updegraff	Rep
4	Henry J. Denton	Dem
5	Tom Moore	Dem
6	J. J. Williams	Dem
6	Richard Billups	Dem
7	Richard Curd	Rep
8	Patrick James Goulding	Dem
9	E. B. Chapman	Rep
9	Sylvester Soldani	Dem
10	J. Q. Newell	Dem
11	Clarence Davis	Dem
12	H. S. Cunningham	Rep
13	S. A. Cordell	Dem
13	Michael Eggerman	Dem
14	Roy Stafford	Dem
14	Frank Colville	Rep
15	L. K. Taylor	Dem
15	George Johnson	Dem
16	Emory Brownlee	Dem
17	Elmer Thomas	Dem
17	D. M. Smith	Dem
18	J. C. Graham	Dem
18	Harry K. Allen	Dem
19	H. S. Blair	Dem
19	Robert Wynne	Dem
20	Jessee Hatchett	Dem
20	Thomas F. Memminger	Dem
21	Edwin Sorrells	Dem
22	Frank Warren	Rep
23	Reuben Roddie	Dem
24	W. P. Stewart	Dem
25	William Redwine	Rep
26	William Franklin	Dem
27	Campbell Russell	Dem
27	Harry B. Beeler	Rep
28	J. Harrie Cloonan	Rep
29	J. M. Keyes	Dem
30	Elias Landrum	Dem
31	P. J. Yeager	Dem
32	R. T. Potter	Rep
33	Joseph Strain	Dem

- Table based on list cross-referenced from three sources.

=== House of Representatives ===
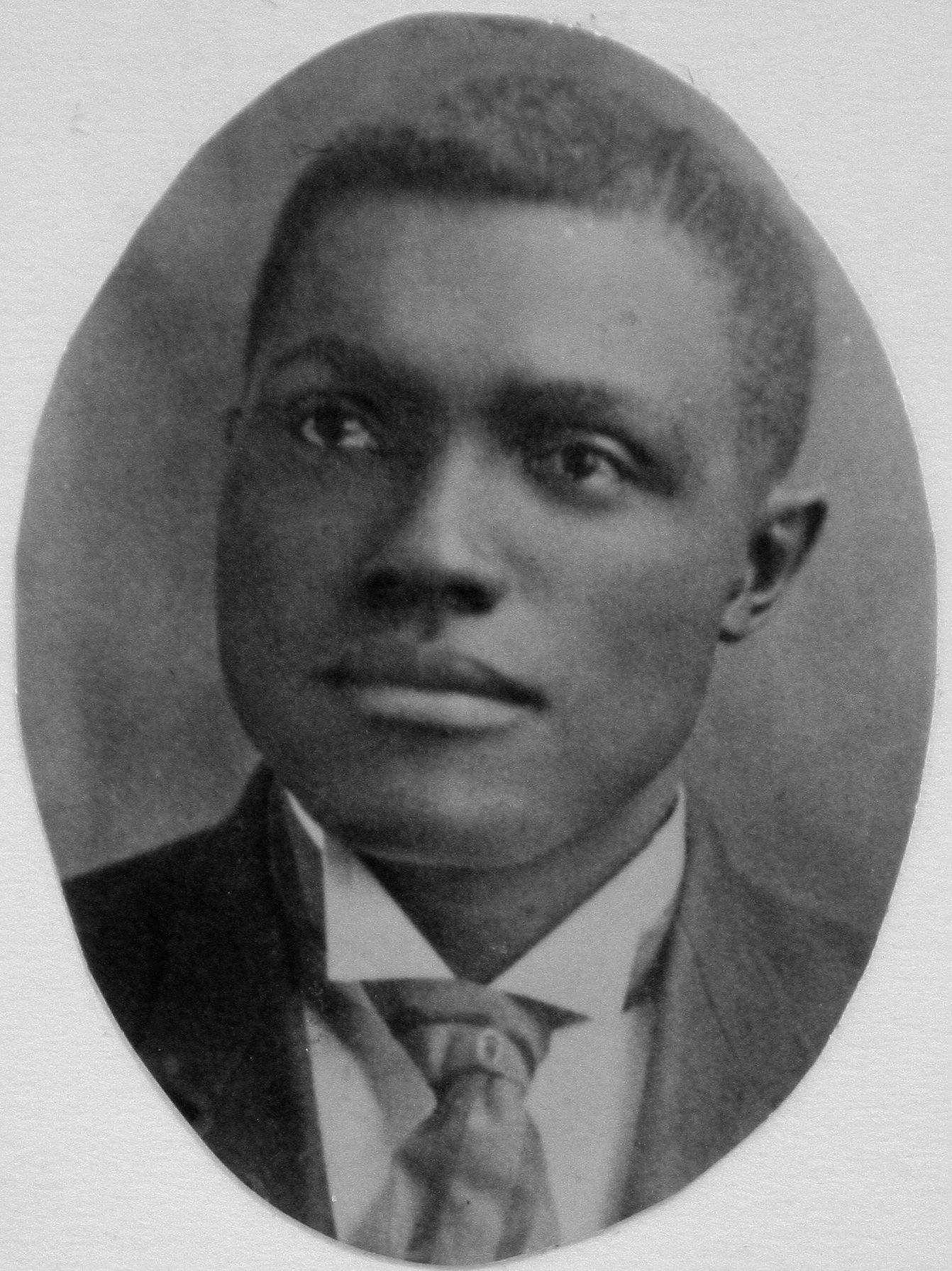
Oklahoma's first black state legislator, A. C. Hamlin.

Name	Party	County
Thomas LaFayette Rider	Dem	Adair
A. J. Butts	Dem	Alfalfa
George W. Partridge	Rep	Alfalfa, Grant
J. M. Humpheys	Rep	Atoka
William A. Durant	Dem	Atoka, Bryan
A. W. Tooley	Rep	Beaver
G. W. Lewis	Dem	Beckham
A. L. Edgington	Rep	Blaine
A. E. Ewell	Dem	Bryan
William F. Semple	Dem	Bryan
J. S. Bell	Dem	Caddo
Joe Smith	Dem	Caddo
Ben Wilson	Dem	Caddo, Canadian, Cleveland
Milton B. Cope	Dem	Canadian
William F. Gilmer	Dem	Carter
John R. Whayne	Dem	Carter
Henry Ward	Rep	Cherokee
Lyman W. White	Dem	Choctaw
Frank L. Casteel	Dem	Cimarron
S. W. Hutchins	Dem	Cleveland
George Jahn	Dem	Coal
John M. Moore	Dem	Coal, Johnston
Leslie P. Ross	Dem	Comanche
Amil H. Japp	Dem	Comanche, Stephens
E. N. Ratcliff	Dem	Craig
Peter J. Coyne	Dem	Craig, Rogers
George O. Helm	Dem	Creek
John Simmons	Rep	Creek, Tulsa
Howell Smith	Dem	Custer
L. L. Reeves	Dem	Custer, Washita
Lee B. Smith	Dem	Delaware
Richard G. Brownlee	Rep	Dewey
H. P. Covey	Rep	Ellis
Joseph M. Porter	Rep	Garfield
Arthur A. Stull	Rep	Garfield
Eugene Watrous	Rep	Garfield, Kingfisher
J. J. Rotenberry	Dem	Garvin
William Robert Wallace	Dem	Garvin
R. L. Glover	Dem	Grady
Henry Ireton	Dem	Grady
Joseph W. Smith	Dem	Grant
James J. Savage	Dem	Greer
George L. Wilson	Dem	Greer
Henry L. Vogle	Rep	Harper
Ed Boyle	Dem	Haskell
Charles A. Cooke	Rep	Haskell, Muskogee
N. J. Johnson	Dem	Hughes
Ben F. Harrison	Dem	Hughes, Pittsburg
S. G. Ashby	Dem	Jackson
Alex Savage	Dem	Jefferson
J. M. Ratliff	Dem	Johnston
Charles M. Compton	Rep	Kay
Lester Maris	Rep	Kay
Harvey Utterback	Rep	Kingfisher
J. V. Faulkner	Dem	Kiowa
J. E. Terral	Dem	Kiowa
Lon Lovelace	Dem	Latimer
Christopher Columbus Mathies	Dem	LeFlore
J. J. Sullivan	Rep	LeFlore, Sequoyah
John B. Charles	Rep	Lincoln
James H. Lockwood	Rep	Lincoln
J. Harvey Maxey Jr.	Dem	Lincoln, Pottawatomie
O. B. Acton	Rep	Logan
A. C. Hamlin	Rep	Logan
John S. Shearer	Rep	Logan
John McCalla	Dem	Love
Joe R. Sherman	Rep	Major
J. W. McDuffee	Dem	Marshall
D. C. Hughes	Dem	Mayes
Thomas C. Whitson	Dem	McClain
C. M. Anderson	Dem	McCurtain
A. J. Milsap	Rep	McIntosh
M. Turner	Dem	Murray
James Knox	Rep	Muskogee
Edward Merrick	Rep	Muskogee
R. F. Howe	Rep	Noble
J. A. Tillotson	Dem	Nowata
Robert J. Dixon	Rep	Okfuskee
Ed Dunn	Dem	Oklahoma
Charles G. Jones	Rep	Oklahoma
S. W. Murphy	Rep	Oklahoma
I. M. Putnam	Dem	Oklahoma
J. H. Lincoln	Rep	Okmulgee
Prentiss Price	Dem	Osage
J. F. Tucker	Dem	Ottawa
John Bonar	Rep	Pawnee
Ed Clark	Rep	Pawnee, Payne
C. E. Sexton	Rep	Payne
Henry M. McElhaney	Dem	Pittsburg
William S. Rogers	Dem	Pittsburg
Frank Huddleston	Dem	Pontotoc
Edgar S. Ratliff	Dem	Pontotoc, Seminole
Milton Bryan	Dem	Pottawatomie
William S. Carson	Dem	Pottawatomie
William F. Durham	Dem	Pottawatomie
Ben T. Williams	Dem	Pushmataha
Joseph L. Paschal	Dem	Roger Mills
C. S. Wortman	Dem	Rogers
H. M. Tate	Rep	Seminole
Isaac Jacobs	Rep	Sequoyah
W. B. Anthony	Dem	Stephens
E. J. Earle	Dem	Texas
Henry R. King	Dem	Tillman
F. L. Haymes	Dem	Tulsa
J. P. Calhoun	Rep	Wagoner
Clint Moore	Rep	Washington
S. C. Burnett	Dem	Washita
H. T. Parsons	Rep	Woods
John H. Bridges	Rep	Woodward

- Table based on government database.
