= 1st Oklahoma Legislature =

Leadership
- President of the Senate: George W. Bellamy (D)
- President Pro Tem of the Senate: Henry S. Johnston (D)
- Speaker of the House: William H. Murray (D)
- Composition: Senate; 38 6 House; 93 16

The 1st Oklahoma Legislature was the first meeting of the Oklahoma Legislature. legislative power of Oklahoma, composed of the Oklahoma State Senate and the Oklahoma House of Representatives. The meeting took place from December 2, 1907, to May 26, 1908, in the Guthrie City Hall Building during the first year of the only term of Governor Charles Haskell.

Both houses of the state legislature had large Democratic majorities. William H. Murray, who had served as the president of the state constitutional convention, was elected by his colleagues as the first Speaker of the Oklahoma House of Representatives. Henry S. Johnston, who had served as the presiding officer of the state constitutional convention, was elected to serve as the first President pro tempore of the Oklahoma Senate.

== Dates of session ==
- Regular session: December 2, 1907 – May 26, 1908

Next: 2nd Legislature

== Major legislation ==
- Prohibition - State Senator Richard Billups authored legislation to prohibit the manufacture, transportation and possession of liquor. The bill was amended by William H. Murray to allow state liquor dispensaries for medicinal and scientific purposes. It was signed by the governor on March 24, 1908.
- Segregation / Jim Crow - The very first bill introduced in both houses once statehood had been achieved was a measure requiring separate coaches and waiting rooms for white and black persons. Oklahoma was admitted to the Union on Saturday, November 16, 1907. The legislature convened two weeks later on Monday December 2. After formalities on the first day, both the House and Senate introduced respective Bill No. 1 on the second legislative day in each chamber, entitled: "An Act for the accommodation, comfort, convenience and protection of passengers on Railroad Trains and Cars." (House) and "An Act to promote the comfort of passengers on railroads, street cars, urban, interurban, suburban cars, and at railroad stations." (Senate). After a suspension of the rules (House) and designation as an emergency bill (Senate), the bill was passed by the House on the fourth legislative day and by the Senate on the fifth by a wide majority of both houses (including many Republicans) and took effect December 18, 1907. The only opposition reported in the record of either chamber was from a Senator that objected "to the section permitting negro nurses and attendants riding in the coach or compartment designated for whites".

== Party composition ==
=== Senate ===
Affiliation	Party (Shading indicates majority caucus)		Total
Affiliation	Democratic	Republican	Total
	38	6	44
Voting share	86.4%	13.6%	

=== House of Representatives ===
Affiliation	Party (Shading indicates majority caucus)		Total
Affiliation	Democratic	Republican	Total
	93	16	109
Voting share	85.3%	14.7%	

== Leadership ==
=== Senate ===
With the Democratic caucus controlling the Oklahoma Senate, Henry S. Johnston of Perry, Oklahoma, was selected to serve as the first President pro tempore of the Oklahoma Senate. Johnston had served as the presiding officer of the state constitutional convention. Lieutenant Governor George W. Bellamy served as the President of the Senate, which gave him a tie-breaking vote and allowed him to serve as a presiding officer.

=== House ===
After much deliberation over who would serve as Speaker of the Oklahoma House of Representatives, the Democratic caucus chose William H. Murray of Tishomingo, Oklahoma, a former Chickasaw Nation representative and the president of the state constitutional convention. Sworn into office on November 16, 1907, Murray pushed for legislation to curb business excesses and support agriculture during his single term as speaker. State Representative Albert H. Ellis, of Garfield County, Oklahoma, was elected by his peers to serve as speaker pro tempore.

=== Staff ===
Charles H. Pittman served as the first chief clerk of the Oklahoma House of Representatives.

== Members ==
=== Senate ===
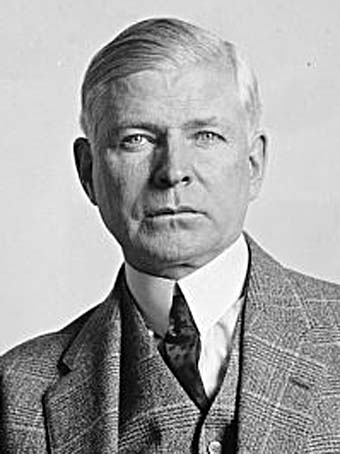
State Senator Elmer Thomas would go on to serve as a United States Senator.

District	Name	Party
Lt-Gov	George W. Bellamy	Dem
1	Joe S. Morris	Dem
2	A. E. Agee	Dem
2	R. E. Echols	Dem
3	A. G. Updegraff	Rep
4	Frank Mathews	Dem
5	Tom Moore	Dem
6	J. J. Williams	Dem
6	Richard Billups	Dem
7	Richard Curd	Rep
8	Patrick James Goulding	Dem
9	Sylvester Soldani	Dem
9	Edmund Brazell	Dem
10	Henry S. Johnston	Dem
11	Clarence Davis	Dem
12	H. S. Cunningham	Rep
13	Michael Eggerman	Dem
13	S. A. Cordell	Dem
14	Roy Everett Stafford	Dem
14	W. H. Johnson	Dem
15	L. K. Taylor	Dem
15	George Johnson	Dem
16	Emory Brownlee	Rep
17	Elmer Thomas	Dem
17	D. M. Smith	Dem
18	J. C. Little	Dem
18	J. C. Graham	Dem
19	H. S. Blair	Dem
19	Robert Wynne	Dem
20	Jessee Hatchett	Dem
20	Thomas F. Memminger	Dem
21	Edwin Sorrells	Dem
22	H. H. Holman	Dem
23	Reuben Roddie	Dem
24	W. P. Stewart	Dem
25	William Redwine	Rep
26	William M. Franklin	Dem
27	Eck Brook	Dem
27	Campbell Russell	Dem
28	Petway Conn	Dem
29	J. M. Keyes	Dem
30	Elias Landrum	Dem
31	P. J. Yeager	Dem
32	H. E. P. Stanford	Rep
33	Joseph Strain	Dem

- Table based on cross-references of three sources.

=== House of Representatives ===
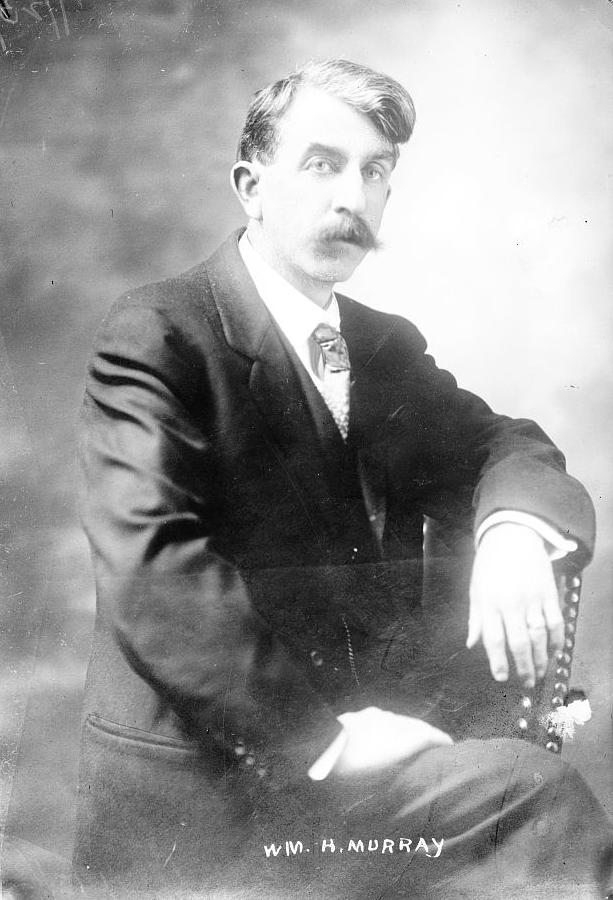
Speaker of the Oklahoma House William H. Murray

Name	Party	County
Thomas LaFayette Rider	Dem	Adair
Dan G. Murley	Dem	Alfalfa
John R. Evans	Rep	Alfalfa, Grant
Robert M. Rainey	Dem	Atoka
William A. Durant	Dem	Atoka, Bryan
Abel J. Sands	Rep	Beaver
George Whitehurst	Dem	Beckham
William H. Bowdre	Rep	Blaine
J. H. Baldwin	Dem	Bryan
A. F. Ross	Dem	Bryan
Charles C. Fisher	Dem	Caddo
Frank Stevens	Dem	Caddo
Ben Wilson	Dem	Caddo, Canadian, Cleveland
Milton B. Cope	Dem	Canadian
Leo Harris	Dem	Carter
J. F. McCants	Dem	Carter
Joseph L. Manus	Dem	Cherokee
William H. Armstrong	Dem	Choctaw
Frank L. Casteel	Dem	Cimarron
J. Vandaveer	Dem	Cleveland
George W. O'Neal	Dem	Coal
C. A. Skeen	Dem	Coal, Johnston
Roy J. Williams	Dem	Comanche
Amil H. Japp	Dem	Comanche, Stephens
E. J. Hobdy	Dem	Craig
John T. Ezzard	Dem	Craig, Rogers
W. B. Stone	Dem	Creek
Woodson Norvell	Dem	Creek, Tulsa
Howell Smith	Dem	Custer
L. L. Reeves	Dem	Custer, Washita
Lee B. Smith	Dem	Delaware
W. G. Smith	Rep	Dewey
Elmer V. Jesse	Dem	Ellis
Albert H. Ellis	Dem	Garfield
Joseph M. Porter	Rep	Garfield
Eugene Watrous	Rep	Garfield, Kingfisher
W. M. Lindsay	Dem	Garvin
William Tabor	Dem	Garvin
Robert M. Johnson	Dem	Grady
Albert S. Riddle	Dem	Grady
Joseph W. Smith	Dem	Grant
George W. Briggs	Dem	Greer
W. C. Pendegraft	Dem	Greer
John W. Durst	Dem	Harper
Ed Boyle	Dem	Haskell
J. B. Crouch	Dem	Haskell, Muskogee
Edward Swengal	Dem	Hughes
Ben F. Harrison	Dem	Hughes, Pittsburg
William A. Banks	Dem	Jackson
Charles M. London	Dem	Jefferson
William H. Murray	Dem	Johnston
Q. T. Brown	Dem	Kay
Logan Hawkins	Dem	Kay
Harvey Utterback	Rep	Kingfisher
Jesse T. Armstrong	Dem	Kiowa
J. V. Faulkner	Dem	Kiowa
James E. Stivers	Dem	Latimer
Charles W. Broome	Dem	LeFlore
E. A. Moore	Dem	LeFlore, Sequoyah
H. M. Jarrett	Dem	Lincoln
James H. Lockwood	Rep	Lincoln
H. G. Stettmund	Dem	Lincoln, Pottawatomie
Will H. Chappell	Rep	Logan
John S. Shearer	Rep	Logan
George H. Stagner	Rep	Logan
John McCalla	Dem	Love
Joe R. Sherman	Rep	Major
H.S.P. Ashby	Dem	Marshall
Henry N. Butler	Dem	Mayes
Thomas C. Whitson	Dem	McClain
William H. Harrison	Dem	McCurtain
William B. Beck	Dem	McIntosh
M. Turner	Dem	Murray
Fred P. Branson	Dem	Muskogee
A. J. Snelson	Dem	Muskogee
Charles A. Fraser	Rep	Noble
J. A. Tillotson	Dem	Nowata
Thomas B. Wortman	Dem	Okfuskee
Curtis R. Day	Rep	Oklahoma
A. T. Earley	Dem	Oklahoma
Charles G. Jones	Rep	Oklahoma
I. M. Putnam	Dem	Oklahoma
William C. McAdoo	Dem	Okmulgee
John D. Deyerle	Dem	Osage
A. G. Martin	Dem	Ottawa
William Murdock	Dem	Pawnee
George D. Hudson	Dem	Pawnee, Payne
P. A. Ballard	Dem	Payne
J. L. Hendrickson	Dem	Pittsburg
Henry M. McElhaney	Dem	Pittsburg
Frank Huddleston	Dem	Pontotoc
Edgar S. Ratliff	Dem	Pontotoc, Seminole
Milton Bryan	Dem	Pottawatomie
William S. Carson	Dem	Pottawatomie
William F. Durham	Dem	Pottawatomie
Ben T. Williams	Dem	Pushmataha
Joseph L. Paschal	Dem	Roger Mills
John F. Tandy	Dem	Rogers
Jesse Chastain	Dem	Seminole
George Winchester Allen	Dem	Sequoyah
W. B. Anthony	Dem	Stephens
E. J. Earle	Dem	Texas
Henry R. King	Dem	Tillman
Cicero Holland	Dem	Tulsa
A. D. Orcutt	Rep	Wagoner
A. F. Vandeventer	Dem	Washington
David L. Smith	Dem	Washita
William T. Abbott	Dem	Woods
Irving Hart	Dem	Woodward

- Table based on government database.

== See also ==
- List of Oklahoma state legislatures
