= 3rd Oklahoma Legislature =

Leadership
- President of the Senate: J. J. McAlester (D)
- President Pro Tem of the Senate: Elmer Thomas (D)
- Speaker of the House: William A. Durant (D)
- Composition: Senate; 31 13; House; 83 26

The Third Oklahoma Legislature was a meeting of the legislative branch of the government of Oklahoma, composed of the Oklahoma Senate and the Oklahoma House of Representatives. The state legislature met in the Levy Building in Oklahoma City, beginning with a special session from November 28 to December 16, 1910, during the end of Governor Charles Haskell's term and ending with a regular session from January 3 to March 11, 1911, during the first year of the term of Governor Lee Cruce. The Democratic Party, which already held the majority of seats in the Oklahoma House of Representatives, further increased the number of seats they held after the 1910 election.

Lieutenant Governor J. J. McAlester served as the President of the Senate and Elmer Thomas served as the President pro tempore of the Oklahoma Senate. W. B. Anthony served as Speaker of the Oklahoma House of Representatives during the special session in 1910, while William A. Durant took over during the regular session in 1911.

== Dates of sessions ==
- Special session: November 28, 1910 – December 16, 1910
- Regular session: January 3-March 11, 1911

Previous: 2nd Legislature • Next: 4th Legislature

== Party composition ==
=== Senate ===
Affiliation	Party (Shading indicates majority caucus)		Total
Affiliation	Democratic	Republican	Total
	31	13	44
Voting share	70.5%	29.5%	

=== House of Representatives ===
Affiliation	Party (Shading indicates majority caucus)		Total
Affiliation	Democratic	Republican	Total
	83	26	109
Voting share	76.1%	23.9%	

== Leadership ==
=== Senate ===
Lieutenant Governor J. J. McAlester served as the President of the Senate, which gave him a tie-breaking vote and allowed him to serve as a presiding officer. Elmer Thomas was elected by state senators to serve as the President pro tempore of the Oklahoma Senate, the primary presiding officer of the Oklahoma Senate.

=== House ===
The Democratic caucus held the majority of seats in the Oklahoma House of Representatives. W. B. Anthony, of Marlow, served as Speaker of the Oklahoma House of Representatives during the special session in 1910, and William A. Durant served as Speaker of the Oklahoma House of Representatives during the regular session in 1911.

== Members ==
=== Changes in membership ===
- George A. Coffey resigned from SD-6. James V. McClintic was elected on November 5, 1912 to finish his term.
- Bill Tilghman resigned from SD-13. C. L. Edmonson was elected on November 5, 1912 to finish his term.

=== Senate ===
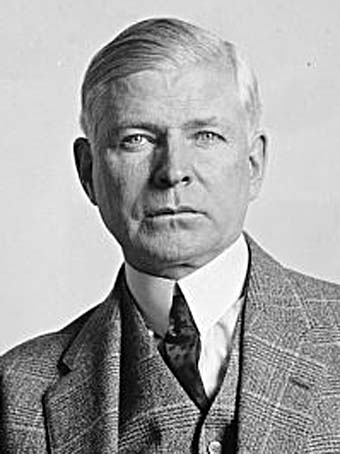
President Pro Tem Elmer Thomas would go on to serve as a United States Senator.

District	Name	Party
Lt-Gov	J. J. McAlester	Dem
1	J. H. Langston	Rep
2	E. L. Mitchell	Dem
2	R. E. Echols	Dem
3	William Briggs	Rep
4	Henry J. Denton	Dem
5	Guy Horton	Dem
6	J. J. Williams	Dem
6	George Coffey	Dem
7	J. W. McCully	Rep
8	Patrick James Goulding	Dem
9	William Dutton	Rep
9	E. B. Chapman	Rep
10	J. Q. Newell	Dem
11	Joseph Jones	Rep
12	Ben Berkey	Rep
13	Michael Eggerman	Dem
13	William Tilghman	Dem
14	Tom McMechan	Dem
14	Frank Colville	Rep
15	George Barefoot	Dem
15	Joe Smith	Dem
16	Emory Brownlee	Dem
17	F. W. Anderson	Dem
17	Elmer Thomas	Dem
18	C. B. Kendrick	Dem
18	Harry K. Allen	Dem
19	Joseph Bryan Thompson	Dem
19	Robert Wynne	Dem
20	Jessee Hatchett	Dem
20	Thomas F. Memminger	Dem
21	Edwin Sorrells	Dem
22	Frank Warren	Rep
23	Reuben Roddie	Dem
24	W. P. Stewart	Dem
25	William Redwine	Rep
26	William Franklin	Dem
27	Sid Garrett	Dem
27	Harry B. Beeler	Rep
28	J. Harrie Cloonan	Rep
29	E. C. Harlan	Dem
30	Elias Landrum	Dem
31	A. F. Vandeventer	Dem
32	R. T. Potter	Rep
33	Gid Graham	Dem

- Table based on 2005 Oklahoma Almanac.

=== House of Representatives ===
Name	Party	County
George W. Smith	Dem	Adair
G. N. Kneeland	Rep	Alfalfa
A. J. Rentfrow	Rep	Alfalfa, Grant
J. W. Clark	Dem	Atoka
William A. Durant	Dem	Atoka, Bryan
A. W. Tooley	Rep	Beaver
George W. Lewis	Dem	Beckham
George Jamison	Rep	Blaine
J. H. Baldwin	Dem	Bryan
William F. Semple	Dem	Bryan
H. M. Christian	Dem	Caddo
G. M. Fuller	Dem	Caddo
Dan W. Perry	Dem	Caddo, Canadian, Cleveland
U. S. Brown	Rep	Canadian
J. B. Champion	Dem	Carter
U. T. Rexroat	Dem	Carter
Houston B. Teehee	Dem	Cherokee
M. L. Webb	Dem	Choctaw
O. Marshall	Dem	Cimarron
Oliver Aiken	Dem	Cleveland
George T. Searcy	Dem	Coal
John M. Moore	Dem	Coal, Johnston
Roy J. Williams	Dem	Comanche
J. W. Leftwich	Dem	Comanche, Stephens
Peter Coyne	Dem	Craig
W. L. Jeffords	Dem	Craig, Rogers
S. J. Smith	Rep	Creek
W. V. Pryor	Dem	Creek, Tulsa
J. M. Thrash	Dem	Custer
George W. Cornell	Dem	Custer, Washita
O. W. Killam	Dem	Delaware
H. O. Devereaux	Rep	Dewey
Flavius Rose	Rep	Ellis
J. B. Campbell	Rep	Garfield
Joseph M. Porter	Rep	Garfield
Eugene Watrous	Rep	Garfield, Kingfisher
O. W. Patchell	Dem	Garvin
William Tabor	Dem	Garvin
E. W. Frey	Dem	Grady
R. L. Glover	Dem	Grady
W. T. Clark	Rep	Grant
K. C. Cox	Dem	Greer
C. H. Madden	Dem	Harmon
Henry L. Vogle	Rep	Harper
H. H. Edwards	Dem	Haskell
Jasper Cullop	Dem	Haskell, Muskogee
Eugene Kerr	Dem	Haskell, Muskogee
N. J. Johnson	Dem	Hughes
William A. Hammond	Dem	Hughes, Pittsburg
S. G. Ashby	Dem	Jackson
Cham Jones	Dem	Jefferson
W. J. Milburn	Dem	Johnston
W. H. Clarke	Rep	Kay
T. O Williams	Dem	Kay
George L. King	Rep	Kingfisher
O. J. Logan	Dem	Kiowa
W. H. New	Dem	Latimer
Charles W. Broome	Dem	LeFlore
S. J. Folsom	Dem	LeFlore, Sequoyah
C. R. Blackburn	Rep	Lincoln
John B. Charles	Rep	Lincoln
J. Harvey Maxey Jr.	Dem	Lincoln, Pottawatomie
O. B. Acton	Rep	Logan
G. E. Clayton	Dem	Logan
John S. Shearer	Rep	Logan
W. H. Brooks	Dem	Love
S. S. Davison	Rep	Major
J. W. McDuffee	Dem	Marshall
R. W. Lindsey	Rep	Mayes
E. L. Green	Dem	McClain
James R. Knight	Dem	McCurtain
J. W. Steen	Dem	McIntosh
Charles B. Emanuel	Dem	Murray
W. C. Jackson	Dem	Muskogee
W. P Miller	Dem	Muskogee
E. T. Testerman	Rep	Noble
C. L. Miller	Dem	Nowata
J. J. Roland	Dem	Okfuskee
Hubert Bolen	Dem	Oklahoma
C. H. DeFord	Rep	Oklahoma
R. L. Peebly	Dem	Oklahoma
John H. Wright	Dem	Oklahoma
J. M. Lenox	Dem	Okmulgee
Charles Bowers Peters	Dem	Osage
James K. Moore	Dem	Ottawa
Ross Brubaker	Dem	Pawnee
Ed Clark	Rep	Pawnee, Payne
T. H. Stockton	Rep	Payne
Henry M. McElhaney	Dem	Pittsburg
S. F. Whitman	Dem	Pittsburg
John P. Crawford	Dem	Pontotoc
J. S. Barham	Dem	Pontotoc, Seminole
Charles F. Barrett	Dem	Pottawatomie
William S. Carson	Dem	Pottawatomie
B. F. Nesbitt	Dem	Pottawatomie
H S P Ashby	Dem	Pushmataha
Perry Madden	Dem	Roger Mills
Joe Chambers	Dem	Rogers
E. E. Jayne	Dem	Seminole
J. W. Breedlove	Dem	Sequoyah
W. B. Anthony	Dem	Stephens
J. V. McClintic	Dem	Swanson
T. O. James	Dem	Texas
Walter L. Coughlin	Dem	Tillman
J. I. Gillespie	Dem	Tulsa
John S. Moss	Dem	Wagoner
Lon Fisher	Dem	Washington
Eckles Harris	Dem	Washita
D. S. Woodson	Dem	Woods
E. G. Vosburgh	Rep	Woodward

- Table based on government database.
