= 4th Oklahoma Legislature =

Leadership
- President of the Senate: J. J. McAlester (D)
- President Pro Tem of the Senate: C. B. Kendrick (D)
- Speaker of the House: J. Harvey Maxey Jr. (D)
- Composition: Senate; 34 10; House; 78 19

The Fourth Oklahoma Legislature was a meeting of the legislative branch of the government of Oklahoma, composed of the Oklahoma Senate and the Oklahoma House of Representatives. The state legislature met in the India White Temple in Oklahoma City, in regular session from January 7 to March 17, 1913, and in special session from March 18 to July 5, 1913, during the term of Governor Lee Cruce.

The 1913 session was marked by the passage of a municipal Sunday closing law, which was favored by Cruce. Lieutenant Governor James Jackson McAlester served as the President of the Senate and C.B. Kendrick served as the President pro tempore of the Oklahoma Senate. J. Harvey Maxey Jr. served as Speaker of the Oklahoma House of Representatives.

== Dates of sessions ==
- Regular session: January 7-March 17, 1913
- Special session: March 18-July 5, 1913

Previous: 3rd Legislature • Next: 5th Legislature

== Party composition ==
=== Senate ===
Affiliation	Party (Shading indicates majority caucus)		Total
Affiliation	Democratic	Republican	Total
	34	10	44
Voting share	77.3%	22.7%	

=== House of Representatives ===
Affiliation	Party (Shading indicates majority caucus)		Total
Affiliation	Democratic	Republican	Total
	78	19	97
Voting share	80.4%	26.4%	

== Major legislation ==
- Sundays - Governor Lee Cruce supported municipal Sunday closing laws and the 1913 state legislature passed House Bill 50, which prohibited a number of Sunday activities.

== Leadership ==
=== Senate ===
Lieutenant Governor James Jackson McAlester served as the President of the Senate, which gave him a tie-breaking vote and allowed him to serve as a presiding officer. C.B. Kendrick was elected by state senators to serve as the President pro tempore of the Oklahoma Senate, the primary presiding officer of the Oklahoma Senate.

=== House ===
J. Harvey Maxey Jr. of Muskogee, Oklahoma, served as Speaker of the Oklahoma House of Representatives in 1913 and Charles B. Emanuel served as Speaker Pro Tempore.

== Members ==
=== Senate ===
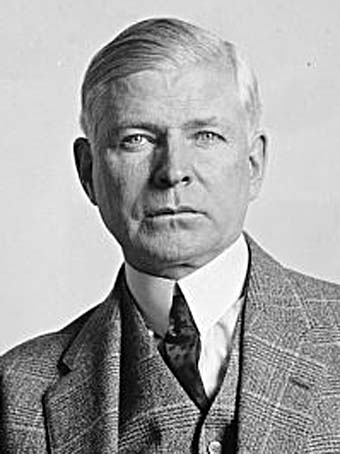
State Senator Elmer Thomas would go on to serve as a United States Senator.

District	Name	Party
Lt-Gov	J. J. McAlester	Dem
1	George Aycock	Dem
2	E. L. Mitchell	Dem
2	R. E. Echols	Dem
3	William Briggs	Rep
4	J. L. Carpenter	Dem
5	Guy Horton	Dem
6	James Austin	Dem
6	J. V. McClintic	Dem
7	J. W. McCully	Rep
8	Eugene Watrous	Rep
9	William Dutton	Rep
9	J. E. Curran	Rep
10	George Waters	Dem
11	Joseph Jones	Rep
12	John H. Burford	Rep
13	Charles F. Barrett	Dem
13	C. L. Edmonson	Dem
14	Tom McMechan	Dem
14	Ben Wilson	Dem
15	George Barefoot	Dem
15	John Pugh	Dem
16	E. J. Warner	Rep
17	F. W. Anderson	Dem
17	Elmer Thomas	Dem
18	C. B. Kendrick	Dem
18	Ben Franklin	Dem
19	J. T. McIntosh	Dem
19	Fred Tucker	Dem
20	Joseph Bryan Thompson	Dem
20	Thomas F. Memminger	Dem
21	Edwin Sorrells	Dem
22	C. W. Board	Dem
23	Reuben Roddie	Dem
24	W. C. McAlister	Dem
25	William Redwine	Rep
26	C. C. Shaw	Dem
27	Sid Garrett	Dem
27	Campbell Russell	Dem
28	M. S. Blassingame	Dem
29	E. C. Harlan	Dem
30	George W. Fields Jr.	Dem
31	A. F. Vandeventer	Dem
32	James H. Sutherlin	Rep
33	Gid Graham	Dem

- Table based on state almanac.

=== House of Representatives ===
Name	Party	County
Thomas LaFayette Rider	Dem	Adair
Charles B. Parkhurst	Rep	Alfalfa
I. L. Cook	Dem	Atoka
R. B. Rutherford	Dem	Beaver, Harper
H. V. Joseph	Dem	Beckham
George Jamison	Rep	Blaine
William A. Durant	Dem	Bryan
R. R. Halsell	Dem	Bryan
H. N. Christian	Dem	Caddo
Theo Pruett	Dem	Caddo
R. J. Thompson	Dem	Canadian
U. T. Rexroat	Dem	Carter
Houston B. Teehee	Dem	Cherokee
Thomas W. Hunter	Dem	Choctaw
W. L. Roberts	Dem	Cimarron, Texas
N. E. Sharp	Dem	Cleveland
George T. Searcy	Dem	Coal
J. M. Haynes	Dem	Comanche, Cotton
Roy J. Williams	Dem	Comanche, Cotton
Peter Coyne	Dem	Craig
H. H. Herman	Rep	Creek
W. S. Dearing	Dem	Custer
Lee Howe	Dem	Delaware
Howell Smith	Dem	Dewey
Flavius Rose	Rep	Ellis
Charles C. Childers	Dem	Garfield
George Dizney	Rep	Garfield
Joe A. Edwards	Dem	Garvin
W B M Mitchell	Dem	Garvin
T. J. Brown	Dem	Grady
A. S. Riddle	Dem	Grady
J. E. Lemon	Dem	Grant
O. L. Cummings	Dem	Greer
H. L. Russell	Dem	Harmon
H. M. Moore	Dem	Haskell
J. B. Griggs	Dem	Hughes
R. J. Morgan	Dem	Jackson
Alonzo McCrory	Dem	Jefferson
Andrew Veatch	Dem	Johnston
W. C. Baum	Rep	Kay
C. L. Pinkham	Dem	Kay
George L. King	Rep	Kingfisher
Leonard Lewis	Dem	Kiowa
Cliff Peery	Dem	Latimer
T.G. McMahan	Dem	LeFlore
J.L. Spengler	Dem	LeFlore
John B. Charles	Rep	Lincoln
Fred Hoyt	Rep	Lincoln
Walter H. Matthews	Dem	Lincoln, Pottawatomie
Frank McGuire	Rep	Logan
W. H. Brooks	Dem	Love
W.T. Ruby	Rep	Major
C.H. Thomas	Dem	Marshall
Gideon Morgan	Rep	Mayes
E.E. Glasco	Dem	McClain
W.S. Davis	Dem	McCurtain
Tom G. Taylor	Dem	McIntosh
Charles B. Emanuel	Dem	Murray
William Carr	Dem	Muskogee
J. Harvey Maxey Jr.	Dem	Muskogee
E.T. Testerman	Rep	Noble
W.A. Chase	Dem	Nowata
W.H. Case	Dem	Okfuskee
George Harvison	Dem	Okfuskee
Hubert Bolen	Dem	Oklahoma
C.H. DeFord	Rep	Oklahoma
Hugh Randall	Dem	Oklahoma
D.B. Welty	Dem	Oklahoma
John H. Wright	Dem	Oklahoma
J.M. Lenox	Dem	Okmulgee
Charles Bowers Peters	Dem	Osage
Marvin B. Prentiss	Rep	Osage
J.S. Mabon	Rep	Ottawa
Stanley Edmister	Rep	Pawnee
J.W. Reece	Dem	Payne
R.I. Bond	Dem	Pittsburg
E.P. Hill	Dem	Pittsburg
S.F. Whitman	Dem	Pittsburg
John P. Crawford	Dem	Pontotoc
James Farrall	Dem	Pottawatomie
Harvey H. Smith	Dem	Pottawatomie
H. O. Tener	Dem	Pottawatomie
H S P Ashby	Dem	Pushmataha
Thomas Joyner	Dem	Roger Mills
Archibald Bonds	Dem	Rogers
W.A. Bishop	Dem	Seminole
William L. Curtis	Dem	Sequoyah
O.M. Morris	Dem	Stephens
W.G. Woodard	Dem	Swanson
Harry Cordell	Dem	Tillman
Frank Z. Curry	Dem	Tulsa
William B. Williams	Dem	Tulsa
John O. Baker	Dem	Wagoner
R. F. Stilwell	Dem	Washington
C. C. Hill	Dem	Washita
W. H. Olmstead	Rep	Woods
E. G. Vosburgh	Rep	Woodward

- Table based on government database.
