= List of first Native American U.S. state legislators =

List of Native Americans who were first state legislators

Native Americans have served in state legislatures, with several interruptions, since Greenwood LeFlore was elected to the Mississippi lower house in 1841. Twenty-one states (out of 50) have yet to elect or appoint any Native American state legislators. This list does not include Native Hawaiians.

== Nationwide ==
Legislator	Nation	Legislative achievement	Seat held	Took office	Left office	Party	Note
Greenwood LeFlore	Choctaw	1^{st} Native American man to be elected to any state legislature	Mississippi House of Representatives	1841	1844	Whig	
William A. Durant	Choctaw	1^{st} Native American to serve as speaker of any state lower house	Speaker of the Oklahoma House of Representatives	1911	1913	Democratic	
Cora Reynolds Anderson	Ojibwe	1^{st} Native American woman elected to any state legislature	Michigan House of Representatives	1924	1925	Republican	
Bill Beltz	Iñupiat	1^{st} Native American to serve as leader of any state upper house	President of the Alaska Senate	1959	1960	Democratic	

== Alaska ==
first Alaska Native men elected to the Alaska House of Representatives: John E. Curtis (Iñupiaq), Charles E. Fagerstrom (Inupiaq), James Hoffman (Yup'ik), Axel C. Johnson (Yup'ik), John Nusunginya (Iñupiaq) (1959)
first Alaska Native men elected to the Alaska Senate: Bill Beltz (Inupiaq), Frank Peratrovich (Tlingit), Eben Hopson (Iñupiaq) (1959)
first Alaska Native man to serve as Alaska Senate President: Bill Beltz (Inupiaq) (1959)
first Alaska Native woman elected to the Alaska House of Representatives: Brenda Itta (Iñupiaq) (1974)
first Alaska Native woman elected to the Alaska Senate: Georgianna Lincoln (Gwich'in) (1993)
first Alaska Native to serve as Speaker of the Alaska House: Bryce Edgmon (Yup'ik) (2017)

== Arizona ==
first Native American man elected to the Arizona House of Representatives: Lloyd House (Navajo, Oneida) (1967)
first Native American man elected to the Arizona Senate: Arthur J. Hubbard Sr. (Navajo) (1972)
first Native American women elected to the Arizona House of Representatives: Debra Lynn Norris (Navajo, Tohono O'odham) and Sally Ann Gonzales (Yaqui) (1997)
first Native American woman elected to the Arizona Senate: Jamescita Peshlakai (Navajo) (2016)

== Arkansas ==
first Native American man elected to the Arkansas House of Representatives: Jeremy Hutchinson (Blackfoot) (2000) first Native American woman elected to the Arkansas House of Representatives: Jo Ellen Carson (Apache Tribe of Oklahoma) (1999)

== California ==
first Native American elected to the California State Assembly and first openly gay Native American California legislator: Todd Gloria (Tlingit) (2016)
first California Native American elected to the California State Assembly: James Ramos (Serrano, Cahuilla) (2018)

== Colorado ==
first Native American elected to the Colorado House of Representatives: Ben Nighthorse Campbell (Cheyenne) (1983)
first Native American elected to the Colorado Senate: Suzanne Williams (Comanche) (2004)

== Idaho ==
first Native American man elected to the Idaho House of Representatives: Joseph Garry (Coeur d'Alene) (1956)
first Native American woman elected to the Idaho House of Representatives: Jeanne Givens (Coeur d'Alene) (1985)

== Illinois ==
first Native American elected to the Illinois General Assembly: Donne Trotter (Choctaw) (1988)
first Native American elected to the Illinois Senate: Donne Trotter (Choctaw) (1993)

== Kansas ==
first Native American woman elected to the Kansas House of Representatives: Ponka-We Victors (Ponca, Tohono O'odham) (2010)
first transgender Native American state legislator: Stephanie Byers (Chickasaw) (2021)

== Kentucky ==
first Native American elected to the Kentucky House of Representatives: Reginald Meeks (Cherokee) (2000)

== Maine ==
first Native Americans appointed to the Maine House of Representatives (non-voting tribal representatives): Francis Loran and John Neptune (Penobscot) (1823)
first Native American elected to the Maine House of Representatives (non-voting): Henry John Bear (Maliseet) (2013)

== Massachusetts ==
first Native American elected to the Massachusetts Legislature: Watson F. Hammond (Montauk) (1837)

== Michigan ==
first Native American to be elected to the Michigan Legislature: Cora Reynolds Anderson (Ojibwe) (1924)

== Minnesota ==
first Native American man elected to the Minnesota Senate: Skip Finn (Ojibwe) (1991)
first Native American woman elected to the Minnesota House of Representatives and first lesbian and two-spirit Native American state legislator: Susan Allen (Lakota) (2001)
first Native American woman elected to the Minnesota Senate: Mary Kunesh (Lakota) (2020)

== Mississippi ==
first Native American in the Mississippi House and State Senate: Greenwood LeFlore (Choctaw) (1841)
first Native American woman elected to the Mississippi House of Representatives: Carolyn Crawford (Ojibwe) (2012)

== Montana ==
first Native American elected to the Montana House of Representatives: Dolly Smith Custer Akers (Assiniboine) (1932)
first Native American woman elected to the Montana Senate: Sharon Stewart-Peregoy (Crow) (2008)
first openly gay Native American elected to the Montana Legislature: Donavon Hawk (2020)

== Nebraska ==
first Native American elected to the Nebraska Legislature: Tom Brewer (Lakota) (2016)

== Nevada ==
first Native American man elected to the Nevada Legislature: Dewey Sampson (Paiute) (1938)

first Native American Speaker of the Nevada House: John Oceguera (Paiute) (2000)

first Native American woman elected to the Nevada State Assembly: Shea Backus (2018)

== New Mexico ==
first Native American man elected to the New Mexico Senate: Tom Lee (Navajo) (1966)
first Native American woman elected to the New Mexico House of Representatives: Lynda Lovejoy (1988)

== North Carolina ==
first Native American elected to the North Carolina House of Representatives: Henry Ward Oxedine (Lumbee) (1973)
first Native American elected to the North Carolina House of Representatives in the 20th century: Charles Graham (Lumbee) (2011)

== North Dakota ==
first Native American elected to the North Dakota Legislature: Arthur Raymond (Lakota) (1970) first Native American woman elected to the North Dakota House of Representatives: Ruth Buffalo (Mandan, Hidatsa, and Arikara) (2018)

== Oklahoma ==
- Several members of the 1st Oklahoma Legislature were Native American including, but not limited to: Elias Landrum, Thomas LaFayette Rider, J. M. Keys, Winchester Allen, and Joseph L. Manus (Cherokee); William A. Durant, W. H. Harrison, E. A. Moore and A. Frank Ross (Choctaw); Robert M. Johnson (Chickasaw), Sylvester Soldani (Osage), and Benjamin F. Harrison (Chickasaw/Choctaw) (1907)
- First Native American Speaker of the Oklahoma House of Representatives: William A. Durant (Choctaw) (1911)
- First Native American woman elected to the Oklahoma Legislature: Helen TeAta Gale Cole (Chickasaw) (1979)
- First LGBT Native American man elected to the Oklahoma Legislature and possibly nationwide: Al McAffrey (Choctaw) (2006)
- First LGBT Native American woman elected to the Oklahoma Legislature: Chelsey Branham (Chickasaw) (2018)

== Oregon ==
first Native American elected to the Oregon House of Representatives: Jackie Taylor (Potawatomi) (1991)

== Pennsylvania ==
first Native American elected to the Pennsylvania House of Representatives: Barbara McIlvaine Smith (Sac and Fox) (2007)

== South Dakota ==
first Native American man elected to the South Dakota Legislature: Pat Flynn Jr. (Lakota) (1970)
first Native American woman elected to the South Dakota Legislature: Theresa Two Bulls (Lakota) (2004)
first Native American elected as South Dakota Senate Minority Leader: Troy Heinert (Lakota)
first Republican Native American woman elected to the South Dakota House of Representatives: Tamara St. John (Dakota) (2019)

== Tennessee ==
first Native American elected to the Tennessee House of Representatives: Bryan Terry (Choctaw) (2015)

== Utah ==
first Native American woman elected to the Utah Legislature: Angela Romero (Assiniboine) (2013)

== Washington ==
first Native American man to be elected to the Washington Legislature: William Bishop (Snohomish) (1898)
first Native American man to be elected to the Washington State Senate: William Bishop (Snohomish) (1919)
first Native American woman elected to the Washington Legislature: Lois Stratton (Spokane) (1971)
first Alaska Native woman elected to the Washington Legislature: Debra Lekanoff (Tlingit, Unangax̂) (2019)

== Wisconsin ==
first Native American elected to the Wisconsin State Assembly: Alonzo D. Dick (Brothertown) (1849)

== Wyoming ==
first Native American man elected to the Wyoming Legislature: Scotty Ratliff (Eastern Shoshone) (1980)
first Native American woman elected to the Wyoming Legislature and first Native American elected to the Wyoming Senate: Affie Ellis (Navajo) (2016)
first Native American woman elected to the Wyoming House of Representatives: Andi Clifford (Northern Arapaho) (2018)

== See also ==
- List of Native American politicians
- Native American women in politics
