= 1912 United States House of Representatives elections in Oklahoma =

- November 5, 1912

All 8 Oklahoma seats to the United States House of Representatives
	Majority party	Minority party
Party	Republican	Democratic
Last election	2	3
Seats won	2	6

The 1912 United States House of Representatives elections in Oklahoma were held on November 5, 1912, to elect the eight U.S. representatives from the State of Oklahoma, one from each of the state's congressional districts and three at-large. The primary elections for the Republican, Democratic, and Socialist parties' nominations took place on August 6, 1912.

== At-large ==
=== Democratic primary ===
1912 U.S. House of Representatives for Oklahoma's at-large districts Democratic primary
Party	Candidate	Votes	%
Democratic	William H. Murray	39,140	12.0%
Democratic	Joseph B. Thompson	31,887	9.7%
Democratic	Claude Weaver	26,923	8.2%
Democratic	Fred P. Branson	22,182	6.8%
Democratic	William M. Franklin	21,427	6.5%
Democratic	Leslie P. Ross	20,288	6.2%
Democratic	James B. A. Robertson	18,252	5.5%
Democratic	Moman Pruiett	15,650	4.8%
Democratic	R. E. Echols	13,556	4.1%
Democratic	Frank Adams	12,320	3.7%
Democratic	N. B. Hays	11,804	3.6%
Democratic	J. Y. Callahan	10,215	3.1%
Democratic	Leslie G. Niblack	9,601	2.9%
Democratic	William T. Field	8,965	2.7%
Democratic	B. V. Cummins	7,281	2.2%
Democratic	George Bowman	6,264	1.9%
Democratic	W. J. Campbell	6,215	1.9%
Democratic	Patrick James Goulding	6,009	1.8%
Democratic	Robert Lee Adderton	5,351	1.6%
Democratic	Jack G. Harley	5,096	1.5%
Democratic	O. Brown	4,792	1.4%
Democratic	Charles Adler	4,518	1.3%
Democratic	M. F. Eggerman	4,189	1.2%
Democratic	D. R. Carpenter	4,077	1.2%
Democratic	Ben Bouldin	3,645	1.1%
Democratic	W. F. Gilmer	2,515	0.7%
Democratic	Augustus E. Ivey	1,905	0.5%
Democratic	William W. Janes	1,897	0.5%
Total votes		325,964	100.00

=== General election ===
1912 U.S. House of Representatives for Oklahoma's at-large districts general election
Party	Candidate	Votes	%
Democratic	William H. Murray	121,202	16.2%
Democratic	Claude Weaver	121,186	16.2%
Democratic	Joseph B. Thompson	120,346	16.1%
Republican	Alvin D. Allen	87,409	11.7%
Republican	James L. Brown	87,264	11.7%
Republican	Emory Brownlee	86,092	11.5%
Socialist	Oscar Ameringer	41,229	5.5%
Socialist	J. T. Cumbie	41,070	5.5%
Socialist	J. Luther Langston	41,020	5.5%
Democratic gain from		Swing	N/A

== District 1 ==
=== Democratic primary ===
1912 Oklahoma's 1st congressional district Democratic primary (August 6, 1912)
Party	Candidate	Votes	%
Democratic	John J. Davis	3,219	29.7%
Democratic	Frank P. Davis	2,417	22.3%
Democratic	J. M. Springer	1,490	13.7%
Democratic	B. J. Waugh	1,469	13.5%
Democratic	Edmond Brazell	1,428	13.2%
Democratic	Sam Gaskell	793	7.3%
Turnout		10816	

=== General election ===
1912 Oklahoma's 1st congressional district election
Party	Candidate	Votes	%	±%
Republican	Bird S. McGuire (incumbent)	19,035	45.0%	−4.2%
Democratic	John J. Davis	18456	43.6%	−1.0%
Socialist	A. W. Renshaw	4447	10.5%	+4.4%
Prohibition	Thomas P. Hopley	322	0.7%	New
Turnout		42260	100%	

== District 2 ==
=== Democratic primary ===
1912 Oklahoma's 2nd congressional district Democratic primary (August 6, 1912)
Party	Candidate	Votes	%
Democratic	J. J. Carney	3,907	22.6%
Democratic	Geo. W. Cornell	3,779	21.9%
Democratic	James S. Ross	3,735	21.6%
Democratic	Dan W. Peery	1,864	10.8%
Democratic	Thomas S. Ballew	1,694	9.8%
Democratic	R. B. Forrest	1,381	8.0 %
Democratic	Ed C. Ballew	887	5.1%
Turnout		17,247	

=== General election ===
1912 Oklahoma's 2nd congressional district election
Party	Candidate	Votes	%	±%
Republican	Dick T. Morgan (incumbent)	24,349	43.8%	−2.2%
Democratic	J. J. Carney	18456	42.7%	−1.3%
Socialist	P. D. McKenzie	7453	13.4%	+3.6%
Turnout		55575	100%	

== District 3 ==
=== Democratic primary ===
1912 Oklahoma's 3rd congressional district Democratic primary (August 6, 1912)
Party	Candidate	Votes	%
Democratic	James S. Davenport (incumbent)	12,688	53.6%
Democratic	W. P. Thraves	3,375	14.2%
Democratic	James H. Sykes	3,303	13.9%
Democratic	M. L. Williams	2,654	11.2%
Democratic	W. A. Huser	1,623	6.8%
Turnout		23643	

=== General election ===
1912 Oklahoma's 3rd congressional district election
Party	Candidate	Votes	%	±%
Democratic	James S. Davenport (incumbent)	27,184	49.5%	−1.1%
Republican	R. T. Daniel	20884	38.0%	+7.7%
Socialist	Lewis B. Irwin	6463	11.7%	−3.3%
Independent	H. L. Storm	363	0.6%	N/A
Turnout		54894	100%	{{{change}}}

== District 4 ==
=== Democratic primary ===
1912 Oklahoma's 4th congressional district Democratic primary (August 6, 1912)
Party	Candidate	Votes	%
Democratic	Charles D. Carter	18,928	72.2%
Democratic	R. H. Stanley	5,716	21.8%
Democratic	J. J. Parsons	1,571	5.9%
Turnout		26215	

=== General election ===
1912 Oklahoma's 4th congressional district election
Party	Candidate	Votes	%	±%
Democratic	Charles D. Carter (incumbent)	23,987	51.3%	−4.3%
Republican	E. N. Wright	11421	24.4%	−5.9%
Socialist	F. W. Holt	11321	24.2%	+10.2%
Turnout		46729	100%	

== District 5 ==
=== Democratic primary ===
1912 Oklahoma's 5th congressional district Democratic primary (August 6, 1912)
Party	Candidate	Votes	%
Democratic	Scott Ferris	24,883	80.3%
Democratic	J. W. Mansell	6,075	19.6%
Turnout		30958	

=== General election ===
1912 Oklahoma's 4th congressional district election
Party	Candidate	Votes	%	±%
Democratic	Scott Ferris (incumbent)	29,574	56.2%	−2.6%
Republican	C. O. Clark	11987	22.7%	−4.9%
Socialist	H. H. Stallard	11033	20.9%	+6.9%
Turnout		52594	100%	
