= 1914 United States House of Representatives elections in Oklahoma =

- November 3, 1914

All 8 Oklahoma seats to the United States House of Representatives
	Majority party	Minority party
Party	Republican	Democratic
Last election	2	6
Seats won	1	7

The 1914 United States House of Representatives elections in Oklahoma were held on November 3, 1914, to elect the eight U.S. representatives from the State of Oklahoma, one from each of the state's congressional districts. The primary elections for the Republican, Democratic, and Socialist parties' nominations took place on August 4, 1914.

== District 1 ==
=== Democratic primary ===
1914 Oklahoma's 1st congressional district Democratic primary (August 4, 1914)
Party	Candidate	Votes	%
Democratic	James S. Davenport (incumbent)	8,991	62.9%
Democratic	Pat Malloy	5,309	37.1
Turnout		14300	

=== Republican primary ===
1914 Oklahoma's 1st congressional district Republican primary (August 4, 1914)
Party	Candidate	Votes	%
Republican	Joseph A. Gill	2,607	59.0%
Republican	Thomas E. Elliot	1,814	41.0%
Turnout		4421	

== District 2 ==
=== Democratic primary ===
1914 Oklahoma's 2nd congressional district Democratic primary (August 4, 1914)
Party	Candidate	Votes	%
Democratic	William W. Hastings	6,052	44.7
Democratic	Campbell Russell	4,761	35.2
Democratic	J. Harvey Maxey Jr.	2,718	20.1
Turnout		13531	

=== Republican primary ===
1914 Oklahoma's 2nd congressional district Republican primary (August 4, 1914)
Party	Candidate	Votes	%
Republican	Charles A. Cook	2,113	100%

== District 3 ==
=== Democratic primary ===
1914 Oklahoma's 3rd congressional district Democratic primary (August 4, 1914)
Party	Candidate	Votes	%
Democratic	Charles D. Carter (incumbent)	13,813	100%

=== Republican primary ===
1914 Oklahoma's 3rd congressional district Republican primary (August 4, 1914)
Party	Candidate	Votes	%
Republican	C. H. Elting	1,163	100%

== District 4 ==
=== Democratic primary ===
1914 Oklahoma's 4th congressional district Democratic primary (August 4, 1914)
Party	Candidate	Votes	%
Democratic	William H. Murray (incumbent)	5,150	33.3%
Democratic	Harvey H. Smith	4,425	28.6%
Democratic	Reuben M. Roddie	4,070	26.3%
Democratic	Charles F. Barrett	1,811	11.7%
Turnout		15456	

=== Republican primary ===
1914 Oklahoma's 4th congressional district Republican primary (August 4, 1914)
Party	Candidate	Votes	%
Republican	James Dennis Flynn	2,275	60.8%
Republican	Edson R. Walte	1,464	39.2%
Turnout		3739	

== District 5 ==
=== Democratic primary ===
1914 Oklahoma's 5th congressional district Democratic primary (August 4, 1914)
Party	Candidate	Votes	%
Democratic	Joseph B. Thompson (incumbent)	6,731	43.3%
Democratic	Claude Weaver (incumbent)	4,313	27.7%
Democratic	Mont R. Powell	2,467	15.9%
Democratic	W. O. Whitewell	2,036	13.1%
Turnout		15547	

=== Republican primary ===
1914 Oklahoma's 5th congressional district Republican primary (August 4, 1914)
Party	Candidate	Votes	%
Republican	D. K. Pope	1,792	39.3%
Republican	Will H. Chappell	1,525	33.4%
Republican	Jas. M. Gresham	1,246	27.3%
Turnout		4563	

== District 6 ==
=== Democratic primary ===
1914 Oklahoma's 6th congressional district Democratic primary (August 4, 1914)
Party	Candidate	Votes	%
Democratic	Scott Ferris (incumbent)	10,680	73.8%
Democratic	Robert Glover	3,800	26.2%
Turnout		14480	

=== Republican primary ===
1914 Oklahoma's 6th congressional district Republican primary (August 4, 1914)
Party	Candidate	Votes	%
Republican	Alvin Campbell	2,275	62.1%
Republican	Hugh E. Reinhardt	1,390	37.9%
Turnout		3665	

== District 7 ==
=== Democratic primary ===
1914 Oklahoma's 7th congressional district Democratic primary (August 4, 1914)
Party	Candidate	Votes	%
Democratic	James V. McClintic	5,731	34.5%
Democratic	James R. Tolbert	5,094	30.7%
Democratic	George W. Cornell	2,740	16.5%
Democratic	Robert T. Williams	1,730	10.4%
Democratic	Jarrett Todd	505	3.0%
Democratic	S. B. Garrett	424	2.6%
Democratic	R. H. Webb	222	1.3%
Democratic	Ben Bouldin	146	0.9%
Turnout		16592	

=== Republican primary ===
1914 Oklahoma's 7th congressional district Republican primary (August 4, 1914)
Party	Candidate	Votes	%
Republican	Walter S. Mills	1,597	100%

== District 8 ==
=== Democratic primary ===
1914 Oklahoma's 8th congressional district Democratic primary (August 4, 1914)
Party	Candidate	Votes	%
Democratic	Henry S. Johnston	2,735	35.8%
Democratic	C. W. Herod	1,985	26.0%
Democratic	Z. A. Harris	1,789	23.4%
Democratic	Ed Brazell	597	7.8%
Democratic	Homer S. Chambers	541	7.1%
Turnout		7647	

=== Republican primary ===
1914 Oklahoma's 8th congressional district Republican primary (August 4, 1914)
Party	Candidate	Votes	%
Republican	Dick T. Morgan	5,860	100%
