= Senator Blair (disambiguation) =

Henry W. Blair (1834–1920) was a U.S. Senator from New Hampshire from 1879 to 1891.

Senator Blair may also refer to:

- Austin Blair (1818–1894), Michigan State Senate
- Craig Blair (born 1959), West Virginia State Senate
- Francis Preston Blair Jr. (1821–1875), Missouri State Senate
- H. S. Blair (1851–1932), Oklahoma State Senate
- John Blair (Tennessee politician) (1790–1863), Tennessee State Senate
- William Blair (American politician) (1820–1880), Wisconsin State Senate
