= Benjamin Franklin Wilson =

Benjamin Franklin Wilson may refer to:

- Ben F. Wilson (1876–1930), American film actor, director, producer and screenwriter
- Benjamin Franklin Wilson (politician) (1851–1937), American politician from the state of Oklahoma
