= Cicero Holland =

American politician

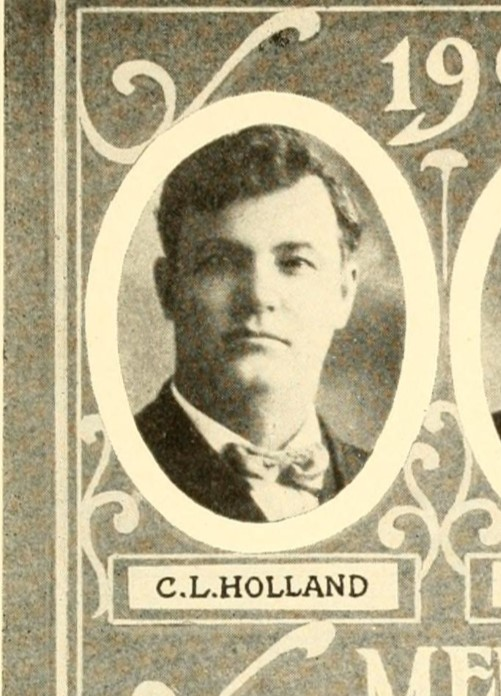

Member of the Oklahoma House of Representatives from the Tulsa County district
- In office November 16, 1907 – November 16, 1908
- Preceded by: Position established
- Succeeded by: F. L. Haymes

Tulsa city councilor
- In office 1903–1907
- Succeeded by: E. B. Howard

Personal details
- Born: 1866 Fairfield County, Ohio, U.S.
- Died: July 26, 1926 Tulsa, Oklahoma, U.S.
- Party: Democratic Party

Cicero Holland was an American politician who served in the Oklahoma House of Representatives from 1907 to 1908. He was the first representative for Tulsa County.

== Biography ==
Cicero L. Holland was born in 1866 in Fairfield County, Ohio, and his family moved to Kansas in 1868. He moved to Ponca City, Oklahoma Territory, in 1897 and then to Comanche County in 1901 where he helped found Hastings, Oklahoma. In 1904 he moved to Tulsa and opened a grocery store.

He represented the 4th Ward of the Tulsa city council until his election to the Oklahoma House of Representatives at Oklahoma statehood. He was succeeded on the council by E. B. Howard. He served in the 1st Oklahoma Legislature, and later died of a heart attack on July 17, 1926 in Tulsa.
