= F. L. Haymes =

American politician

Craig County, Oklahoma county judge
- In office 1947–1948
- In office 1918–1925

Craig County, Oklahoma county attorney
- In office 1934–1946

Member of the Oklahoma House of Representatives from the Tulsa County district
- Preceded by: Cicero Holland
- Succeeded by: J. I. Gillespie

Personal details
- Born: 1873 or 1874
- Died: January 19, 1950 Vinita, Oklahoma, U.S.
- Party: Democratic Party

F. L. Haymes (sometimes spelled F. L. Haynes) was an American politician who served in the Oklahoma House of Representatives from 1908 to 1910. He represented Tulsa County as member of the Democratic Party.

== Biography ==
F. L. Haymes was born in 1873 or 1874, and was admitted to the Missouri Bar Association in 1895. He moved to Broken Arrow in 1903 and was elected to the Oklahoma House of Representatives in 1908 from Tulsa County. He was a member of the Democratic Party and served in the 2nd Oklahoma Legislature. He was preceded in office by Democrat Cicero Holland and succeeded in office by Democrat J. I. Gillespie.

After leaving the legislature, he was elected Craig County judge from 1918 to 1925, and county attorney from 1934 to 1946, and again as county judge from 1947 to 1948. He died on January 19, 1950, in Vinita, Oklahoma.
