= Lyman W. White =

Member of the Oklahoma House of Representatives from the Choctaw County district
- In office 1909 – April 30, 1910
- Preceded by: W. H. Armstrong
- Succeeded by: M. L. Webb

Personal details
- Born: December 8, 1858 Salem, Illinois, United States
- Died: April 30, 1910 (aged 51) Hugo, Oklahoma, United States
- Party: Democratic Party

Lyman W. White was an American politician who served in the Oklahoma House of Representatives from 1909 to 1910.

== Biography ==
Lyman W. White was born on December 8, 1858, in Salem, Illinois, to John and Mary White. He received a law degree from the University of Illinois and later moved to Missouri around 1886. In 1905, he moved to Hugo, Oklahoma Territory where he served as mayor. He served in the 2nd Oklahoma Legislature from 1909 until his death. He was a member of the Democratic Party and represented Choctaw County. He was preceded in office by W. H. Armstrong and was succeeded by M. L. Webb. He died on April 30, 1910, in Hugo, Oklahoma.
