= H. O. Tener =

Member of the Oklahoma House of Representatives from the Pottawatomie County district
- In office 1913–1915
- Preceded by: B. F. Nesbitt
- Succeeded by: W. K. Dunn

Personal details
- Died: June 18, 1928 (aged 58) Oklahoma City, Oklahoma, United States
- Political party: Democratic Party

H. O. Tener was an American politician who served in the Oklahoma House of Representatives from 1913 to 1915. He was also a member of the Oklahoma Constitutional Convention.

== Biography ==
Tener was elected as the Dewey County delegate to the Oklahoma Constitutional Convention. After statehood, Governor Charles N. Haskell appointed him to the Oklahoma State Board of Health. He later moved to Pottawatomie County and was elected to the 4th Oklahoma Legislature. As a member of the Democratic Party, he served in the Oklahoma House of Representatives from 1913 to 1915. He succeeded B. F. Nesbitt and was succeeded by W. K. Dunn. He died on June 18, 1928, in Oklahoma City.
