= Christopher Columbus Mathies =

Member of the Oklahoma House of Representatives from the LeFlore County district
- In office 1909–1911
- Preceded by: C. W. Broome
- Succeeded by: C. W. Broome

Personal details
- Born: May 3, 1850 Gadsden, Alabama, United States
- Died: January 7, 1915 (aged 64) Wister, Oklahoma
- Party: Democratic Party

Christopher Columbus Mathies (May 3, 1850 – January 7, 1915) was an American politician who served in the Oklahoma House of Representatives from 1909 to 1911 and as a member of the Oklahoma Constitutional Convention.

== Biography ==
Christopher Columbus Mathies was born on May 3, 1850, in Gadsden, Alabama, to William Henry Mathies and Ann Alford. He joined the Confederate States Army at the age of 13 and fought at the Battle of Missionary Ridge. He left the army on May 9, 1865. He moved to Arkansas in 1872 before moving again in 1875 to Indian Territory. That year he married Almeda Killen, a Choctaw citizen, who died a year later. In 1879, he married Ocy Woodson, who died in 1883. In 1884, he married Annie Carnall.

He was elected as a delegate to the Oklahoma Constitutional Convention from the 100th district in 1906. He was elected to the 2nd Oklahoma Legislature as a member of the Democratic Party. He represented the LeFlore County district in the Oklahoma House of Representatives. He was preceded and succeeded in office by C. W. Broome. He later served two terms as a LeFlore county commissioner. He died on January 7, 1915, in Wister, Oklahoma.
