= Richard Billups =

American politician

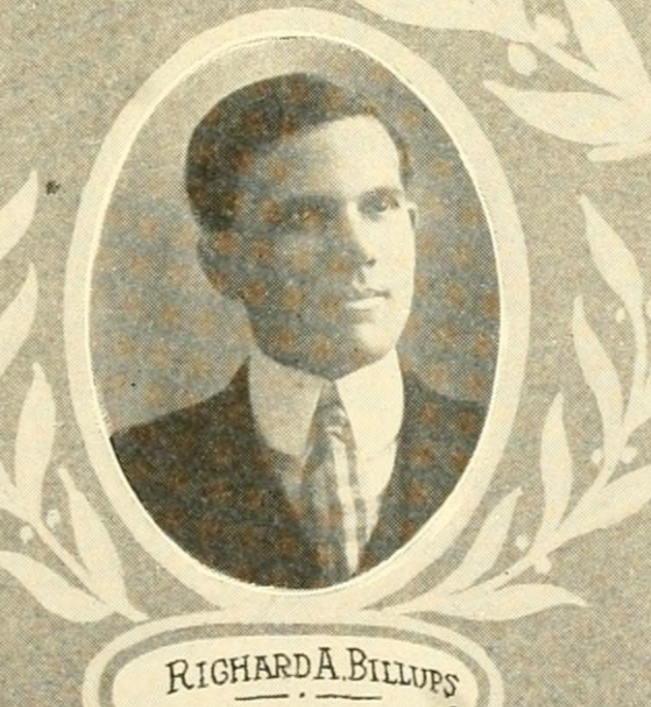
- Billups before 1912

Member of the Oklahoma Senate from the 6th district
- In office November 16, 1907 – November 16, 1910 Serving with J. J. Williams
- Preceded by: Position established
- Succeeded by: George A. Coffey

Personal details
- Born: Richard Alphonzo Billups; April 24, 1878 Mississippi, U.S.
- Died: August 6, 1948 (aged 70) Oklahoma City, Oklahoma, U.S.
- Party: Democratic Party
- Spouse: Lelia Beatrice Tyler
- Children: 5
- Education: Cumberland Law School

Richard Alphonzo Billups (April 24, 1878 – August 6, 1948) was an American politician who served as a Democratic Party member of the Oklahoma Senate representing the 6th district from 1907 to 1910.

== Biography ==
Born in Mississippi on April 24, 1878, Billups attended Cumberland Law School in Lebanon, Tennessee.

On Easter Sunday, March 30, 1902, Billups married Lelia Beatrice Tyler at her parents' home in Duck Hill, Mississippi.

Billups died on April 24, 1948, aged 67, at his home in Oklahoma City, two days after suffering a heat attack. He was survived by his wife and their five children.

== Billups law ==
He is remembered for chairing the 1st Oklahoma Legislature Senate Prohibition Committee and pushing through "Billups Booze Bill," a bill to prohibit the manufacture, transportation, and possession of liquor. William H. Murray pushed for the inclusion of an exception for medical and scientific purposes. He ran for Lieutenant Governor of Oklahoma in 1914.

== Electoral history ==
Oklahoma lieutenant gubernatorial Democratic primary (August 4, 1914)
Party	Candidate	Votes	%
Democratic	Martin E. Trapp	18,178	16.0%
Democratic	Ben F. Lafayette	17,192	15.1%
Democratic	Pete P. Duffy	16,307	14.3%
Democratic	Frank F. Davis	14,498	12.7%
Democratic	Woodson Norvell	11,351	9.9%
Democratic	Edwin Sorrells	10,646	9.3%
Democratic	Richard A. Billups	10,233	9.0%
Democratic	John W. Barbour	8,704	7.6%
Democratic	Bert Van Leuven	3,312	2.9%
Democratic	Robert H. Oury	3,123	2.7%
Turnout		113,544	
