= Albert H. Ellis =

American politician

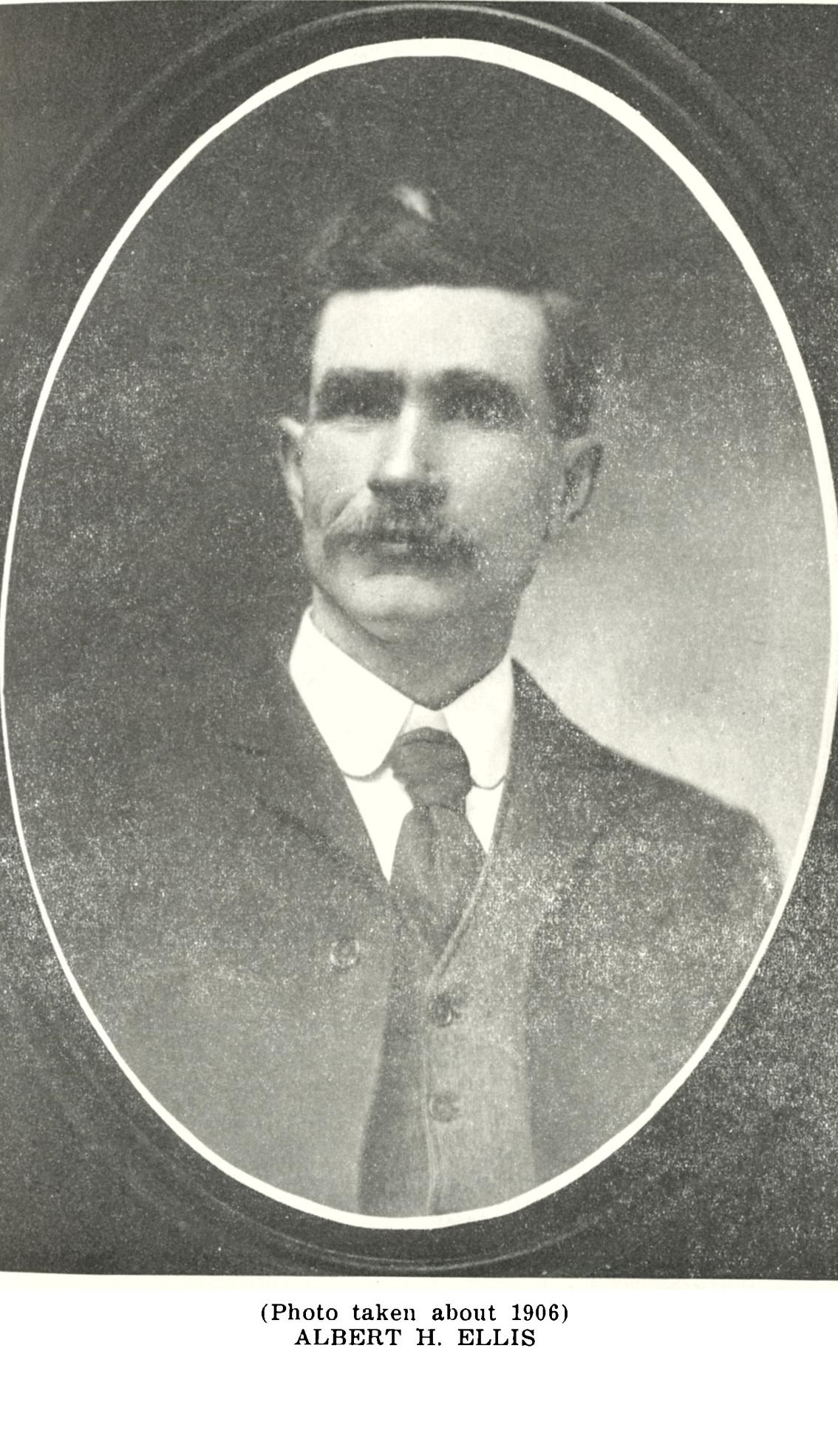

Speaker Pro Tempore of the Oklahoma House of Representatives
- In office November 16, 1907 – November 16, 1908
- Preceded by: Position established
- Succeeded by: Ben F. Harrison

Member of the Oklahoma House of Representatives
- In office November 16, 1907 – November 16, 1908
- Preceded by: Position established
- Succeeded by: Arthur A. Stull
- Constituency: Garfield County

Personal details
- Born: Albert Harman Ellis; December 17, 1861 Indiana, U.S.
- Died: June 18, 1950 (aged 88)
- Party: Democratic Party

Albert Harman Ellis (December 17, 1861 – June 18, 1950) was an American Democratic politician and farmer from Oklahoma.

Ellis, born in Indiana on December 17, 1861, came to Oklahoma as a homesteader, participating in the Land Run of 1893 that opened the Cherokee Outlet for settlement. Ellis settled in present-day Garfield County southwest of Hayward.

Ellis was a member of the fourth Territorial Legislature of Oklahoma, the Oklahoma Constitutional Convention, and served as speaker pro tempore of the Oklahoma House of Representatives in the first Legislature of Oklahoma. He was defeated for reelection to the House by three votes. Ellis County, Oklahoma is named for him. Ellis died on June 18, 1950.

== Electoral history ==
Oklahoma lieutenant gubernatorial Democratic primary (August 2, 1910)
Party	Candidate	Votes	%
Democratic	J.J. McAlester	33,064	30.2%
Democratic	Frank P. Davis	24,104	22.0%
Democratic	J. M. Postelle	14,747	13.4%
Democratic	P. P. Duffy.	13,388	12.2%
Democratic	P. J. Yeager	10,524	9.6%
Democratic	Albert H. Ellis	9,699	8.8%
Democratic	Robert L. Notson	3,870	3.5%
Turnout		109,396	
