= Sylvester Soldani =

American-Osage politician (1860–1934)

Member of the Oklahoma Senate from the 9th district
- In office November 16, 1907 – November 16, 1910 Serving with Edmund Brazell (1907-1908) and E. B. Chapman (1908-1910)
- Preceded by: Position established
- Succeeded by: William Dutton

Personal details
- Born: September 3, 1860 Kansas City, Missouri, U.S.
- Died: July 2, 1934 (aged 73) Kansas City, U.S.
- Citizenship: Osage Nation; American
- Party: Democratic Party

Sylvester J. Soldani was an American and Osage politician who served in the Oklahoma Senate from statehood in 1907 until 1910.

== Biography ==
Sylvester Soldani was born on September 3, 1860, in Kansas City, Missouri, to John and Matilde Soldani. He was a citizen of the Osage Nation through his mother.

Soldani served in the Oklahoma Senate representing the 9th district in the 1st and 2nd Oklahoma Legislature as a member of the Democratic Party. He was succeeded in office by Republican senator William Dutton.

He died on July 2, 1934, in Kansas City.
