= A. C. Hamlin =

American politician (1881–1912)

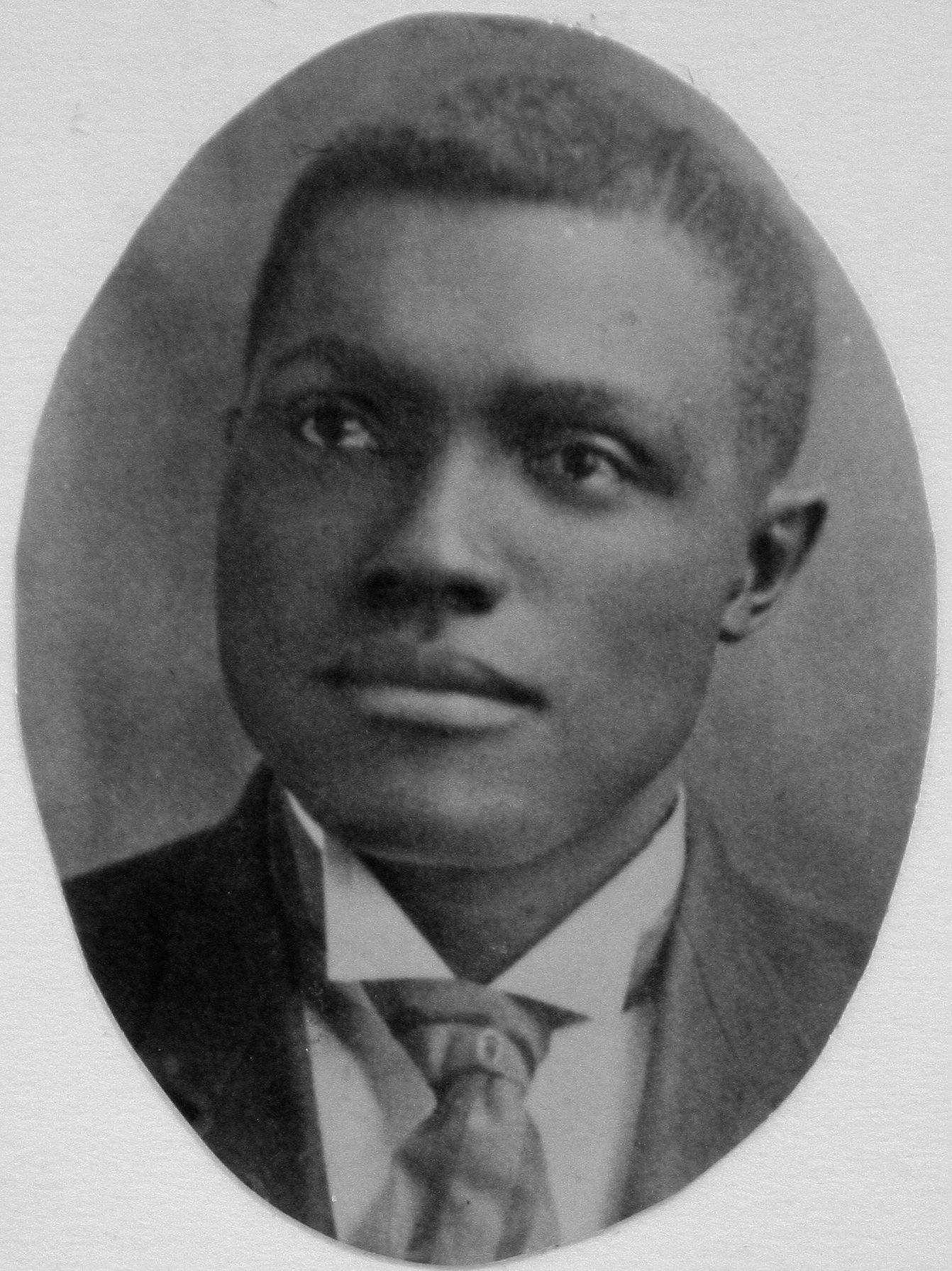

Member of the Oklahoma House of Representatives
- In office November 18, 1908 – November 23, 1910

Personal details
- Born: February 10, 1881 Topeka, Kansas, U.S.
- Died: August 29, 1912 (aged 31) Logan County, Oklahoma, U.S.
- Party: Republican
- Spouse: Katie Weaver (m. 1899)
- Children: 5

Albert Comstock Hamlin (February 10, 1881 – August 29, 1912) was the first African American elected to the Oklahoma Legislature. He lost his re-election bid as a direct result of a constitutional amendment that prevented many black Oklahomans from voting. Hamlin was buried in Logan County, Oklahoma.

== Early life ==
Born in Topeka, Kansas, to former slaves Andrew Jackson and Fanny Hamlin, A. C. Hamlin arrived in Oklahoma Territory in 1890 with the family. He married Katie Weaver in 1899 and had five children.

Before his election to the Oklahoma Legislature, Hamlin served on a school board and a town trustee.

== Political career ==
Hamlin won a seat in the Oklahoma House of Representatives in 1908 due to the large predominance of African Americans in the Logan County, Oklahoma district.

Oklahoma Democratic politicians were determined to keep African Americans from rising in society, as evidenced by the leader of the constitutional convention who exclaimed that blacks would always remain bootblacks, barbers and farmers.

Despite his dual minority status as an African-American and a Republican, Hamlin was able to receive support for bills to provide funding for a black school in his district, address unequal facilities for black and white railroad passengers, and prohibit certain activities on Sunday.

Hamlin lost a bid for reelection in 1910 after a constitutional amendment limited black voters by creating voter registration requirements including literacy and registration of individuals or their ancestors prior to January 1, 1866. Known as the "grandfather clause," the amendment was declared unconstitutional by the 1915 Guinn v. United States case. The "grandfather clause" was responsible for an exodus of African-Americans from Oklahoma to Canada.

== Death and legacy ==
Hamlin died August 29, 1912, on his farm from unknown causes, and was buried in Robinson Cemetery in Logan County, Oklahoma. The Hamlin family cemetery plot includes his headstone and the headstone of a G. H. Hamlin.

On February 21, 2009, the Logan County state representative introduced an amendment to name a part of Interstate 35 from Waterloo to Charter Road in southern Logan County as the "A.C. Hamlin Parkway". The amendment won approval as part of House Bill 2691 as was signed by Oklahoma Governor Brad Henry. In May 2015, the Oklahoma Department of Transportation placed signage denoting the designation.

As of 2023, the 24th biennial awards banquet named for A. C. Hamlin was held by Oklahoma's Legislative Black Caucus, composed of black Oklahoma House and State Senate elected officials. Oklahoma Governor Mary Fallin signed a bill designating "Swing Low, Sweet Chariot" as the official gospel song of Oklahoma during the 2011 banquet.

Former Oklahoma Governor Frank Keating authored a July 2020 editorial in The Oklahoman advocating that Oklahoma State University rename the then-named Murray Hall after A.C. Hamlin. The university ultimately decided on a different name for the campus buildings.
