= J. Harrie Cloonan =

American politician (1875-?)

Member of the Oklahoma Senate from the 28th district
- In office 1908–1912
- Preceded by: P. C. Conn
- Succeeded by: M. S. Blassingame

Personal details
- Born: April 24, 1875 Napoleon, Michigan, U.S.
- Party: Republican

J. Harrie Cloonan was an American politician who served in the Oklahoma Senate from 1908 to 1912 representing the 28th district.

== Biography ==
J. Harrie Cloonan was born in Napoleon, Michigan, on April 24, 1875, to Thomas Cloonan and Susan Marron. His parents were both Irish immigrants and moved to Oklahoma Territory in 1901 and was a member of the Sequoyah Constitutional Convention in 1898. He was a member of the Republican Party. He married Ressie Judd in 1900.

Cloonan was elected to the Oklahoma Senate from 1908 to 1912 representing the 28th district as a member of the Republican Party. He was preceded in office by P. C. Conn and succeeded in office by M. S. Blassingame.

In 1910, he ran for the Republican Party's nomination for Oklahoma Corporation Commissioner but lost the primary to Emory Brownlee.

== Electoral history ==
1910 Oklahoma Corporation Commissioner Republican primary (August 2, 1910)
| Party | Candidate | Votes | % |
|---|---|---|---|
| Republican | Emory Brownlee | 23,929 | 41.0% |
| Republican | Sherman W. Hill | 16,827 | 28.8% |
| Republican | J. B. Queen | 9,592 | 16.4% |
| Republican | J. Harrie Cloonan | 7,912 | 13.5% |
| Turnout | | 58,260 | |
