= Joseph L. Manus =

American politician (1871–1920)

Member of the Oklahoma House of Representatives from the Cherokee County district
- In office November 16, 1907 – 1908
- Preceded by: position established
- Succeeded by: Henry Ward

Personal details
- Born: 1871 Tahlequah, Cherokee Nation (1794–1907), Indian Territory
- Died: June 27, 1920 Tahlequah, Oklahoma, U.S.
- Citizenship: Cherokee Nation; American
- Education: Hillsdale College

Joseph L. Manus was a Cherokee and American politician who served in the Oklahoma House of Representatives from 1907 to 1908.

== Biography ==
Joseph L. Manus was born in 1871 and raised near Tahlequah in the Indian Territory (modern state of Oklahoma). He was the son of Skake Manus, a senator in the Cherokee Nation Senate. He attended Hillsdale College from September 1891 until 1896. He played for the Hillsdale Chargers football program from 1892 to 1894, and was the first Native American to attend Hillsdale, where he played football. He was a member of the original Cherokee Nation. After graduating in 1896 he married Effie May Peterson. The couple had six children.

Manus represented Cherokee County in the 1st Oklahoma Legislature as a member of the Democratic Party. He was a member of the Oklahoma House of Representatives and was succeeded in office by Republican representative Henry Ward.

He died on June 27, 1920, of Bright's disease in Tahlequah, Oklahoma. He was posthumously inducted into the Hillsdale College athletic Hall of Fame in 2001.
