= William A. Durant =

Native American politician

William Durant
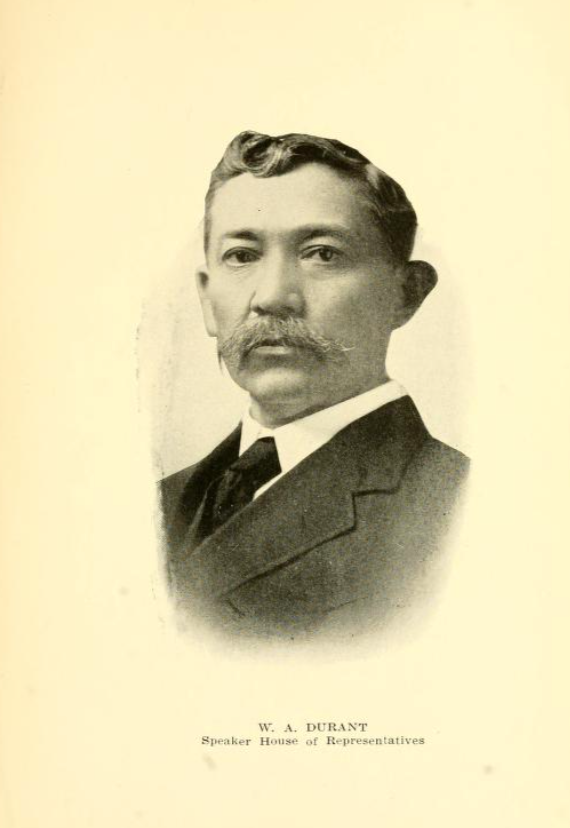

4th Speaker of the Oklahoma House of Representatives
- In office 1911–1913
- Preceded by: W. B. Anthony
- Succeeded by: J. Harvey Maxey Jr.

Member of the Oklahoma House of Representatives
- In office 1907–1913
- Preceded by: District established
- Succeeded by: District disestablished
- In office 1913–1919
- Preceded by: J. H. Baldwin
- Succeeded by: Porter Newman
- Constituency: Atoka and Bryan counties (1907-1913); Bryan County (1913-1919)

Chief of the Choctaw Nation
- In office 1937–1948
- Nominated by: Franklin D. Roosevelt
- Preceded by: Ben Dwight
- Succeeded by: Harry J. W. Belvin

Member of the Choctaw National Council from the Pushmataha District
- In office 1890–1906
- Constituency: Okchamali Kaunti

Personal details
- Born: March 18, 1866 Bennington, Choctaw Nation, Indian Territory
- Died: August 1, 1948 (aged 82) Tuskahoma, Oklahoma, U.S.
- Party: Democratic
- Spouse: Ida May Corber
- Occupation: lawyer, politician

William A. Durant (March 18, 1866 – August 1, 1948) was a Choctaw politician in the U.S. state of Oklahoma. A lawyer, he sat in the tribal legislature and later became Speaker of the Choctaw Nation before its annexation in 1906. He played a role in Oklahoma statehood and served in the Oklahoma House, rising to become its fourth Speaker. He was the sponsor of a bill that created Southeastern Oklahoma State University. He served later in life as chief of the Choctaw Nation during World War II.

== Early life ==
Born in Bennington, in Indian Territory, on March 18, 1866, he was the son of Sylvester Durant, a Presbyterian minister, and Martha Robinson. He earned a master's degree in education from Arkansas College in 1886.

A lawyer, Durant was licensed to practice in the courts of the Choctaw and Chickasaw Nations and in United States federal courts. In 1890, he was elected to the legislature of the Choctaw Nation and became speaker in 1891. He married Ida May Corber on April 19, 1892.

Durant served as a sergeant-at-arms at the 1906 Oklahoma constitutional convention.

On November 16, 1907, Durant took part in the ceremony that united Oklahoma Territory and Indian Territory into the U.S. state of Oklahoma. Durant's role was to give away the bride, Miss Indian Territory, to the groom.

== Oklahoma Legislature ==
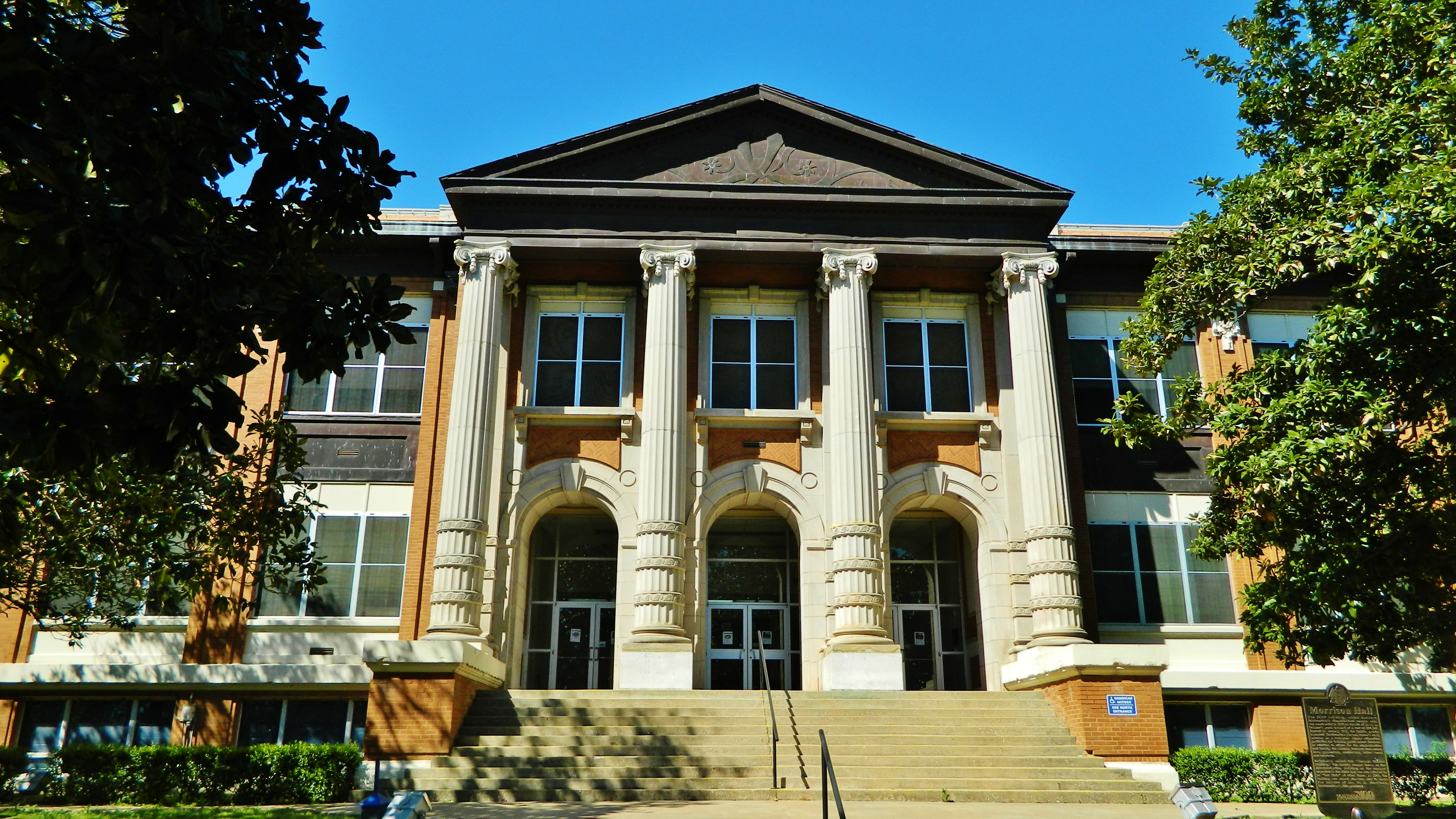
Morrison Hall, Southeastern Oklahoma State University

Durant was elected to the Oklahoma Legislature in 1907, after Oklahoma became a state, and served in the 1st Oklahoma Legislature. During the regular session of the 2nd Oklahoma Legislature in 1909, he sponsored a bill that set the Southeastern Normal School, which later became Southeastern Oklahoma State University, in Durant, Oklahoma. Enacted March 6, 1909, the legislation initially created an education institution that offered four years of high school and junior college. The school opened its doors to students on June 14, 1909. Durant was also one of the authors of a bill that dealt with the location of Oklahoma's capital.

He served as the third Speaker of the Oklahoma House of Representatives during the regular session of the 3rd Oklahoma Legislature. He continued to serve in the 4th Oklahoma Legislature and served as Speaker Pro Tempore in the 5th Oklahoma Legislature, when a special session was called to address the United States Supreme Court decision on Jim Crow laws. His final term in the Oklahoma House of Representatives ended in 1917, after the regular session of the 6th Oklahoma Legislature.

Durant served as Speaker of the Choctaw Nation during his service in the state legislature and as its speaker, the only man to do so. He also served as Secretary of the Oklahoma Senate and as a Chief Clerk of the Oklahoma House of Representatives.

== Choctaw Nation chief ==
When Oklahoma became a state, United States presidents appointed the chiefs of the Choctaw Nation. Durant, who was appointed chief by President Franklin Delano Roosevelt, served as Principal Chief of the Choctaw Nation from 1937 to 1948, leading the tribe during World War II.

== Death ==
Durant died in Tuskahoma on August 1, 1948, and is buried in Durant, Oklahoma.
