= Irving Hart =

American politician (1851–1927)

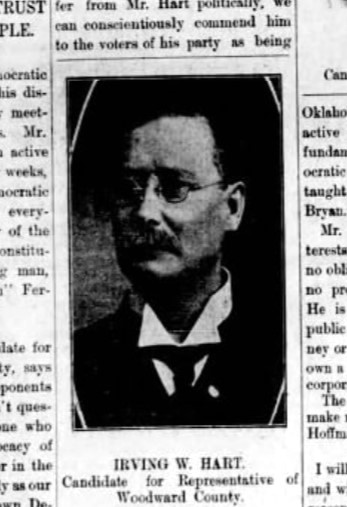
- Hart in 1907

Member of the Oklahoma House of Representatives from the Woodward County district
- In office November 16, 1907 – 1909
- Preceded by: Position established
- Succeeded by: John H. Bridges

Personal details
- Born: September 23, 1851 New York City, New York, United States
- Died: April 3, 1927 (aged 75) Oklahoma City, Oklahoma, United States
- Party: Democratic Party

Irving Wallace Hart (September 23, 1851 – July 3, 1927) was an American politician who served in the Oklahoma House of Representatives from 1907 to 1909.

== Biography ==
Irving Wallace Hart was born on September 23, 1851, in New York City to Robert Hope and Margaret Irving Hart. In 1888, he married Mary Nancy Schell and the couple had one daughter, Hazel Margaret Garringer. He went west as a boy and eventually settled in Woodward, Oklahoma Territory, in 1893. In Woodward, he opened a mercantile business.

In 1907, Hart was elected to represent the Woodward County district of the Oklahoma House of Representatives as a member of the Democratic Party. He was succeeded in office by John H. Bridges in 1909. While in office, he helped establish the West Oklahoma Hospital for the Insane. He died on July 3, 1927, in Oklahoma City.
