= Charles Bowers Peters =

American politician

Member of the Oklahoma House of Representatives from the Osage County district
- In office November 1910 – November 1914
- Preceded by: Prentiss Price
- Succeeded by: Loris E. Bryant

Personal details
- Born: October 25, 1877 Sedan, Kansas, U.S.
- Died: January 18, 1957 (aged 79) Tulsa, Oklahoma, U.S.
- Party: Democratic Party

Charles Bowers Peters was an American politician who served in the Oklahoma House of Representatives representing the Osage County district from 1910 to 1914.

== Biography ==
Charles B. Peters was born on October 25, 1877, in Sedan, Kansas. At 15, he was the editor for the Caney Times in Caney, Kansas. When he was 23, he moved to Osage County, Oklahoma, where he ran the Osage Journal and Pawhuska Capitol. In 1908, he married Jessie Crane and the couple moved to Hominy, where he ran the Hominy News.

Peters served in the Oklahoma House of Representatives as a member of the Democratic Party representing the Osage County district from 1910 to 1914. He was preceded in office by Prentiss Price and succeeded in office by Loris E. Bryant. After leaving the legislature he worked as an attorney. In 1921, he moved to Tulsa and he was a delegate to the 1936 Democratic National Convention. In 1923, he was named alongside Klan leaders as a defendant in a lawsuit by S. K. Lesky, who was tarred and feathered by the Klan. He died on January 18, 1957, in Tulsa.
