= Benjamin Franklin Wilson (politician) =

American politician

Ben Wilson
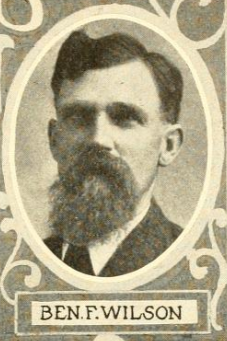

Member of the Oklahoma Senate from the 14th district
- In office 1913–1917
- Preceded by: Frank M. Colville
- Succeeded by: W. K. Snyder

2nd Speaker of the Oklahoma House of Representatives
- In office 1909–1911
- Preceded by: William H. Murray
- Succeeded by: W. B. Anthony

Member of the Oklahoma House of Representatives from the Caddo, Canadian, and Cleveland counties district
- In office 1907–1911
- Preceded by: Position established
- Succeeded by: Dan W. Perry

Member of the Oklahoma Territorial House from the 13th district
- In office 1897–1899
- Preceded by: W. H. Mason
- Succeeded by: J. W. Heady

Personal details
- Born: 1855 Texas, US
- Died: 1934 (aged 78–79) Oklahoma City, Oklahoma, US
- Political party: Democratic Party
- Spouse: Jenny Horne

Benjamin Franklin Wilson was an American politician from the U.S. state of Oklahoma. He was a member of the 1st Oklahoma Legislature and served as the second Speaker of the Oklahoma House of Representatives.

== Early life ==
Born in 1855, in Texas to John Wilson Jr. and Emily Brown. He later married Jenny Horne. Prior to his election, he was an alfalfa farmer.

== Political career ==
Wilson was among Oklahoma's first class of state legislators, serving in the 1st Oklahoma Legislature in the Oklahoma House of Representatives. The state legislature met from December 2, 1907, to May 26, 1908, in the Guthrie City Hall Building during the first year of the only term of Governor Charles N. Haskell.

He served as the second Speaker of the Oklahoma House of Representatives, during the 2nd Oklahoma Legislature. At the time, he hailed from a town known as Cereal, which was later renamed to Banner, Oklahoma. The town ceased to exist in 1954.

He represented the 14th district in the Oklahoma Senate from 1913 to 1917. He was a member of the Democratic Party.

== Later life and death ==
Benjamin continued to live in Oklahoma, enumerated in the 1920 census in Canadian County, and 1930 census for Oklahoma County. Benjamin Franklin Wilson died April 25, 1934.
