= P. J. Yeager =

American politician (born 1859)

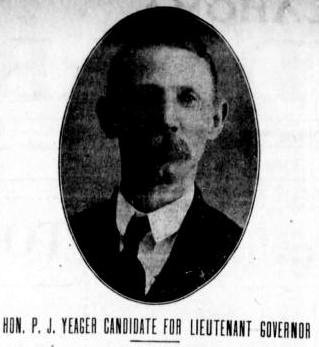

Member of the Oklahoma Senate
- In office November 16, 1907 – 1911
- Preceded by: Position established
- Succeeded by: A. F. Vandeventer
- Constituency: Tulsa County

Alderman for Tulsa, Indian Territory
- In office 1906 – November 16, 1907
- Succeeded by: Position disestablished

Personal details
- Born: April 10, 1859 Columbus, Ohio
- Party: Democratic Party

P. J. Yeager was an American politician who served in the Oklahoma Senate from statehood in 1907 until 1911.

== Biography ==
P. J. Yeager was born in Columbus, Ohio on April 10, 1859. He moved to Guthrie, Illinois at age 20 and opened a general store. In 1895, he moved to Arkansas and he moved again in 1902 to Tahlequah, Cherokee Nation. In 1904, his family settled in Tulsa where he was elected as an alderman in 1906. He was elected to the 1st Oklahoma Legislature as a member of the Democratic Party representing Tulsa County in the Oklahoma Senate from 1907 until 1911. He ran for Lieutenant Governor of Oklahoma in the 1910 Oklahoma elections.
