= Elias Landrum =

American judge (1866–1958)

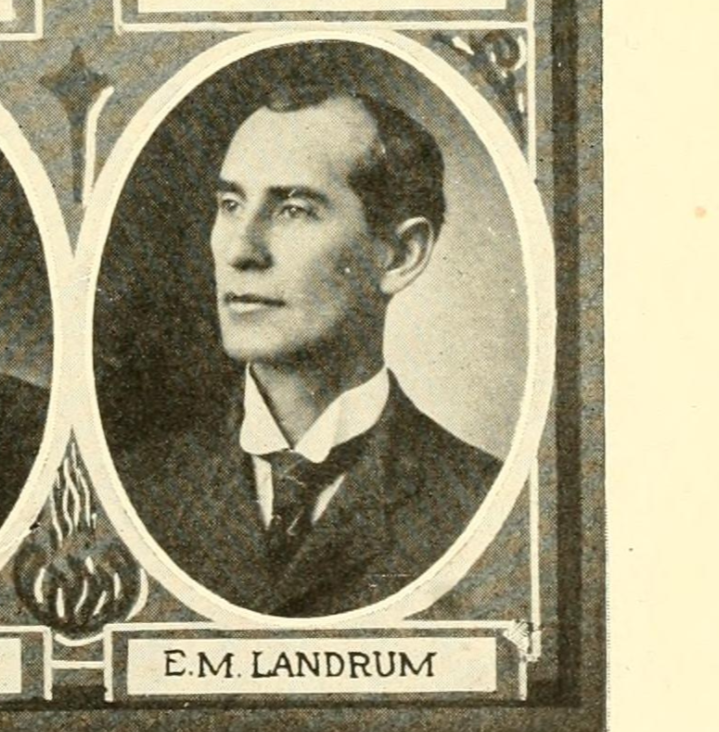
- Landrum before 1912

Craig County Judge
- In office 1934–1936

Craig County Treasurer
- In office 1930–1934

Member of the Oklahoma Senate from the 30th district
- In office November 16, 1907 – 1913
- Preceded by: Position established
- Succeeded by: George W. Fields Jr.

Tahlequah City Recorder
- In office 1903–1905

Tahlequah Alderman
- In office 1899–1903

Member of the Cherokee Nation Senate
- In office 1895–1899

Cherokee Nation district judge
- In office 1893–1895

Personal details
- Born: Elias McLeod Landrum; March 6, 1866 Rhea's Mill, Texas, U.S.
- Died: June 1958 Vinita, Oklahoma, U.S.
- Party: Democratic Party
- Spouse: Nana Woodall
- Children: 4
- Education: Oxford College of Emory University

Elias McLeod Landrum was an American and Cherokee politician who served in the Oklahoma Senate from 1907 to 1913. Prior to Oklahoma statehood, he was a politician in the Cherokee Nation serving as a district judge, in the national legislature, and on the city council for the capital city of Tahlequah.

After leaving the state senate, he worked as an auditor for the state and was later elected Craig County Treasurer in 1930. In 1935, after being elected county judge the year prior, he was indicted for a $37,000 embezzlement scheme. While his conviction was on appeal, Governor E. W. Marland granted him parole and he spent the rest of his career working for the Oklahoma Tax Commission. He died in 1958.

== Early life and Cherokee political career ==
Elias McLeod Landrum was born on March 6, 1866, in Rhea's Mill, Texas. He attended the Cherokee Nation's primary schools and graduated from Worcester Academy in 1885. He graduated from Emory College in 1890 and started teaching in Hillsboro, Georgia. In December 1891, his father died and he returned home to manage the family farm he inherited near Vinita. He found a job as a teacher and was elected district judge in 1893 and to the Cherokee Senate representing the Delaware District in 1895. He married Nana Woodall on September 10, 1895, and moved to Tahlequah later that year. The couple had four children.

Landrum was elected as an alderman in Tahlequah in 1899 and 1901. He built a home in town in 1900 and bought a jewelry store in March 1901. By November 1902 he lost the store to foreclosure, but was able to keep his home. In 1903, he was elected recorder for the city of Tahlequah.

== Oklahoma politics ==
In June 1907, he ran for the Democratic Party's nomination for Cherokee County register of deeds. He lost the primary to Robert W. Foster. After a tri-county Democratic convention deadlocked on the party's nominee for Oklahoma's 30th senate district, Landrum was nominated as a compromise candidate. He won the 1907 general election and reelection to a four-year term in 1909.

During his first term in the Oklahoma Senate, he advocated authored two notable failed bills. The first would have banned the use of an Indian's likeness in tobacco advertising and the other would have funded the placement of a statue of Sequoyah in Statuary Hall. Landrum advocated for the creation of the state normal school that would become Northeastern State University. After the school opened, Landrum tried to secure a mathematics professorship, but Oklahoma Attorney General Charles West objected to the appointment as a conflict of interest since Landrum created the position while in the Oklahoma Legislature.

In 1910, Landrum ran for Oklahoma State Examiner and Inspector. He lost the Democratic primary to incumbent Charles A. Taylor. In the 2nd and 3rd Oklahoma Legislature, he worked with Houston B. Teehee to protect Cherokee orphans and extend tribal rights to Cherokees born after the close of the Dawes Rolls. He also continued to advocate for the state to fund a Sequoyah statue for Statuary Hall. In 1911, he moved to Oklahoma City and found work as a clerk in the city treasurer's office. In 1913 he was the assistant state inspector for Fred Parkinson and he worked in that office until 1930. He lost two campaigns for the U.S. House of Representatives in 1924 and 1930.

In 1930, he was elected Craig County Treasurer and he was reelected in 1932. In 1934, he was elected Craig County Judge. In 1935, Landrum was indicted for embezzlement and accused of stealing $36,985.55 alongside R. J. Hutchman. Both Landrum and Hutchman were found guilty of the crime, but Landrum appealed and Governor E. W. Marland granted him parole after pleas for clemency from state senators Henry C. Timmons and Jack L. Rorschach, Oklahoma Supreme Court Justice W. H. Kornegay and state representative S. F. Parks. After his parole he moved to Oklahoma City and worked for the Oklahoma Tax Commission before returning to Vinita. He died in June 1958.

== Electoral history ==
Oklahoma State Examiner and Inspector Democratic primary (August 2, 1910)
Party	Candidate	Votes	%
Democratic	Charles A. Taylor (incumbent)	64,439	66.4%
Democratic	E. Mack Landrum	32,486	33.5%
Turnout		96,925	
