= H. S. Blair =

American politician (1851–1932)

Member of the Oklahoma Senate from the 19th district
- In office November 16, 1907 – 1910 Serving with W. P. Wynne
- Preceded by: Position established
- Succeeded by: Joseph B. Thompson

Member of the North Carolina Senate from the 36th district
- In office 1889–1891 Serving with S. B. Briggs
- Preceded by: John Tull; Isaac H. Bailey
- Succeeded by: L. T. Avery; J. T. Reid

Personal details
- Born: 1851 Alexander County, North Carolina, U.S.
- Died: 18 January 1932 (aged 81) Taylorsville, North Carolina, U.S.
- Party: Democratic
- Education: Rutherford College; Wake Forest School of Law
- Occupation: Politician, lawyer, newspaper editor

Hartwell S. Blair (1851 – January 18, 1932) was an American politician, lawyer, and newspaper editor who served in the North Carolina Senate from 1889 to 1891 and the Oklahoma Senate from 1907 to 1910. He founded the Drumright Derrick and owned or edited several other local newspapers, including the Chickasaw Banner and the Maysville News.

== Early life and career ==
Hartwell S. Blair was born in Alexander County, North Carolina, in 1851, the son of Morgan Blair and Elizabeth McLeod. He graduated from Rutherford College and the Wake Forest University School of Law before practicing law and editing The Lenoir News-Topic.

Blair served in the North Carolina Senate from 1889 to 1891, representing the 36th district alongside S. B. Briggs. He was preceded in office by John Tull and Isaac H. Bailey, and was succeeded by L. T. Avery and J. T. Reid.

== Move to Oklahoma and later career ==
Following his tenure in North Carolina, Blair moved to Oklahoma Territory. In 1907, he ran for the Oklahoma Senate, competing against G. G. Guthrie, Moman Pruiett, Charley Roff, and W. P. Wynne in a top-two Democratic primary. Placing first in the primary ahead of Wynne, both men advanced to the general election. He went on to serve in both the 1st and 2nd Oklahoma Legislatures representing the 19th district alongside Wynne from 1907 to 1910, before being succeeded by Joseph B. Thompson.

In 1910, Blair ran for Oklahoma State Auditor, finishing second in the Democratic primary to William Macklin Cross.

Blair founded the Drumright Derrick in 1913, serving as its editor before selling the publication in 1916. At various points in his career, he also owned and edited the Chickasaw Banner and the Maysville News.

== Personal life and death ==
Blair returned to North Carolina around 1924, settling in Taylorsville. He died there on January 18, 1932, following several months of failing health.

== Electoral history ==
Oklahoma State Auditor Democratic primary (August 2, 1910)
Party	Candidate	Votes	%
Democratic	William Macklin Cross (Note: Cross died on August 3, 1910.)	59,018	54.9%
Democratic	H. S. Blair	18,332	17.1%
Democratic	H. A. Tucker	15,499	14.5%
Democratic	W. F. Gilmer	14,540	13.5%
Turnout		107,389	
