= Jessee Hatchett =

American judge and politician

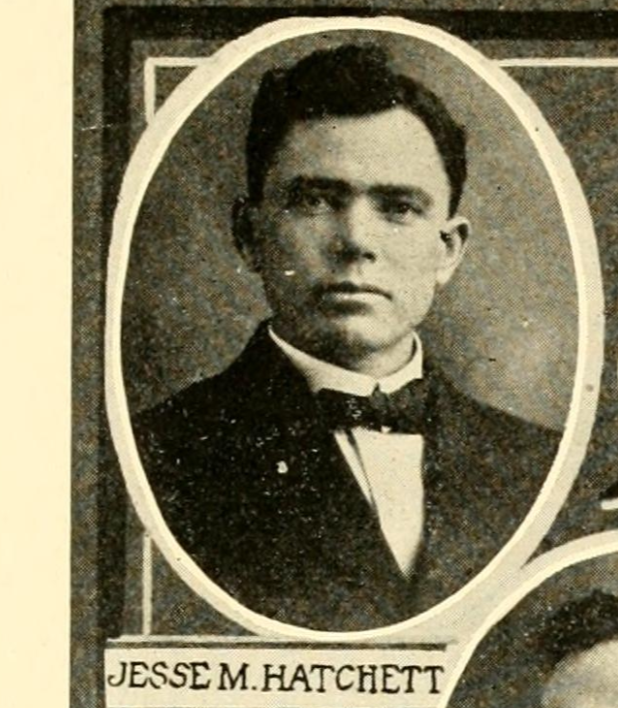
- Hatchett in 1912

District Judge for Oklahoma's 6th Judicial District
- In office 1912–1919
- Preceded by: A. H. Ferguson
- Succeeded by: J. M. Crook

Member of the Oklahoma Senate from the 20th district
- In office November 16, 1907 – 1912
- Preceded by: Position established
- Succeeded by: Joseph B. Thompson

Personal details
- Party: Democratic Party

Jessee M. Hatchett (December 27, 1874 – April 2, 1926) was an American judge and politician who served in the Oklahoma Senate from 1907 to 1912 and as District Judge of the 6th Judicial District from 1912 to 1919.

== Biography ==
Jessee M. Hatchett was born in Schulenburg, Texas, to John M. and Sarah E. Hatchett on December 27, 1874. He graduated from the University of Texas in 1896 and moved to Davis, Indian Territory. In 1898 he moved to Durant. He married Meta Yarbrough and had three children. He was elected to the Oklahoma Senate in 1907 and served until 1912 when he became the District Judge of the 6th judicial district. He retired in 1919 and died on April 2, 1926. He was a member of the Democratic Party.
