= A. F. Vandeventer =

American politician

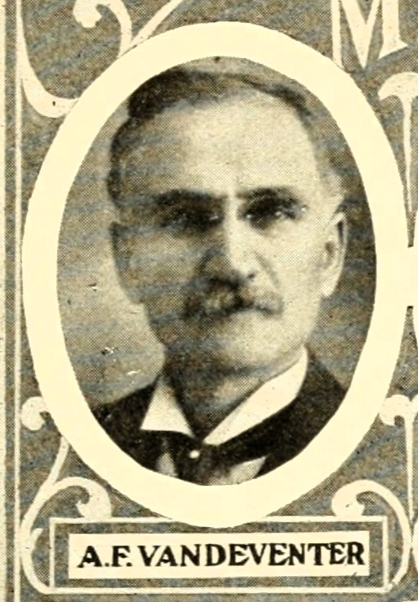
- Vandeventer circa 1907

Member of the Oklahoma Senate from the 31st district
- In office November 16, 1910 – November 16, 1914
- Preceded by: P. J. Yeager
- Succeeded by: R. L. Davidson

Member of the Oklahoma House of Representatives
- In office November 16, 1907 – November 16, 1908
- Preceded by: Position established
- Succeeded by: Clint Moore
- Constituency: Washington County, Oklahoma

Speaker of the Arkansas House of Representatives
- In office 1899–1901
- Preceded by: James Camp Tappan
- Succeeded by: T. H. Humphreys

Member of the Arkansas House of Representatives
- In office 1897–1901
- Constituency: Conway County, Arkansas

Personal details
- Born: 1862 Fulton County, Illinois
- Died: November 5, 1931 (aged 68–69) Bartlesville, Oklahoma
- Party: Democratic

Algernon Foster Vandeventer (1862 – November 5, 1931) was an American politician. He was a son of John Finley Vandeventer and Sarah C. Bowers, and a distant relative of Supreme Court Justice Willis Van Devanter. He was a member of the Arkansas House of Representatives, serving from 1897 to 1901. He was a member of the Democratic party. After serving in the Arkansas Legislature, he moved to Oklahoma and served in the Oklahoma House of Representatives and Oklahoma Senate.
