= Campbell Russell =

American politician

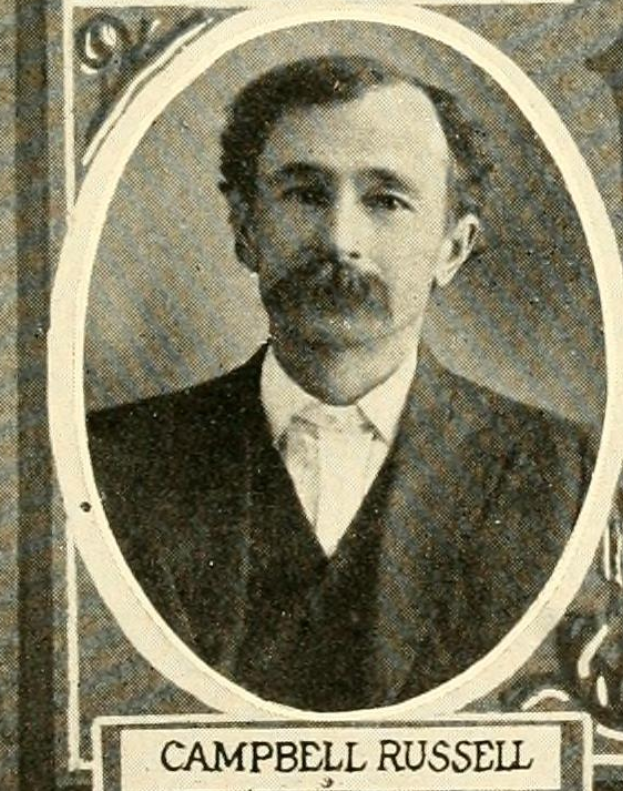
- Russell in 1909

Oklahoma Corporation Commissioner
- In office January 1917 – January 1923
- Preceded by: George A. Henshaw
- Succeeded by: Frank Carter

Member of the Oklahoma Senate from the 27th district
- In office November 16, 1912 – November 16, 1916
- Preceded by: Sid Garrett
- Succeeded by: Eugene Kerr
- In office November 16, 1907 – November 16, 1910
- Preceded by: Position established
- Succeeded by: Sid Garrett

Personal details
- Born: 1863
- Died: 1937 (aged 73–74)
- Party: Democratic Party

Campbell Russell was an American politician who served in the Oklahoma Senate and as an Oklahoma Corporation Commissioner.

== Early life ==
Campbell Russell was born in 1863. He moved to Indian Territory between 1880 and 1882, settling in the Muscogee Nation (present-day Muskogee County). He later owned 27,000 head of cattle through his Prairie Stock Farm in Warner. He founded and funded the first free school for white children in Indian Territory. He built a four classroom school in 1905 and donated it to the town.

== Oklahoma politics ==
Russell was elected to the Oklahoma Senate as a Democrat in 1907 representing the 27th district and served four consecutive terms. He unsuccessfully ran for the United States House of Representatives in 1910 and 1914. In 1916, he was elected to the Oklahoma Corporation Commission. In 1922, he was admitted to the Oklahoma Bar Association. Russell played a major role in the impeachment of Oklahoma Governor Jack C. Walton and was a member of the Ku Klux Klan. He also worked for Farmer's Union and the Southwest Light and Power Company. He ran for Oklahoma's 9th congressional district in 1930. He died in 1937.

== Electoral history ==
1910 Oklahoma's 3rd congressional district Democratic primary (August 2, 1910)
Party	Candidate	Votes	%
Democratic	James S. Davenport	10,998	47.8%
Democratic	S.L. Johnson	5,807	27.7%
Democratic	Campbell Russell	4,406	21.0%
Democratic	Kenneth S. Murchinson	692	3.3%
Turnout		20,913	

1914 Oklahoma's 2nd congressional district Democratic primary (August 4, 1914)
Party	Candidate	Votes	%
Democratic	William Wirt Hastings	6,052	44.7%
Democratic	Campbell Russell	4,761	35.2%
Democratic	J. Harvey Maxey Jr.	2,718	20.1%
Turnout		13531	
