= W. B. Anthony =

American politician

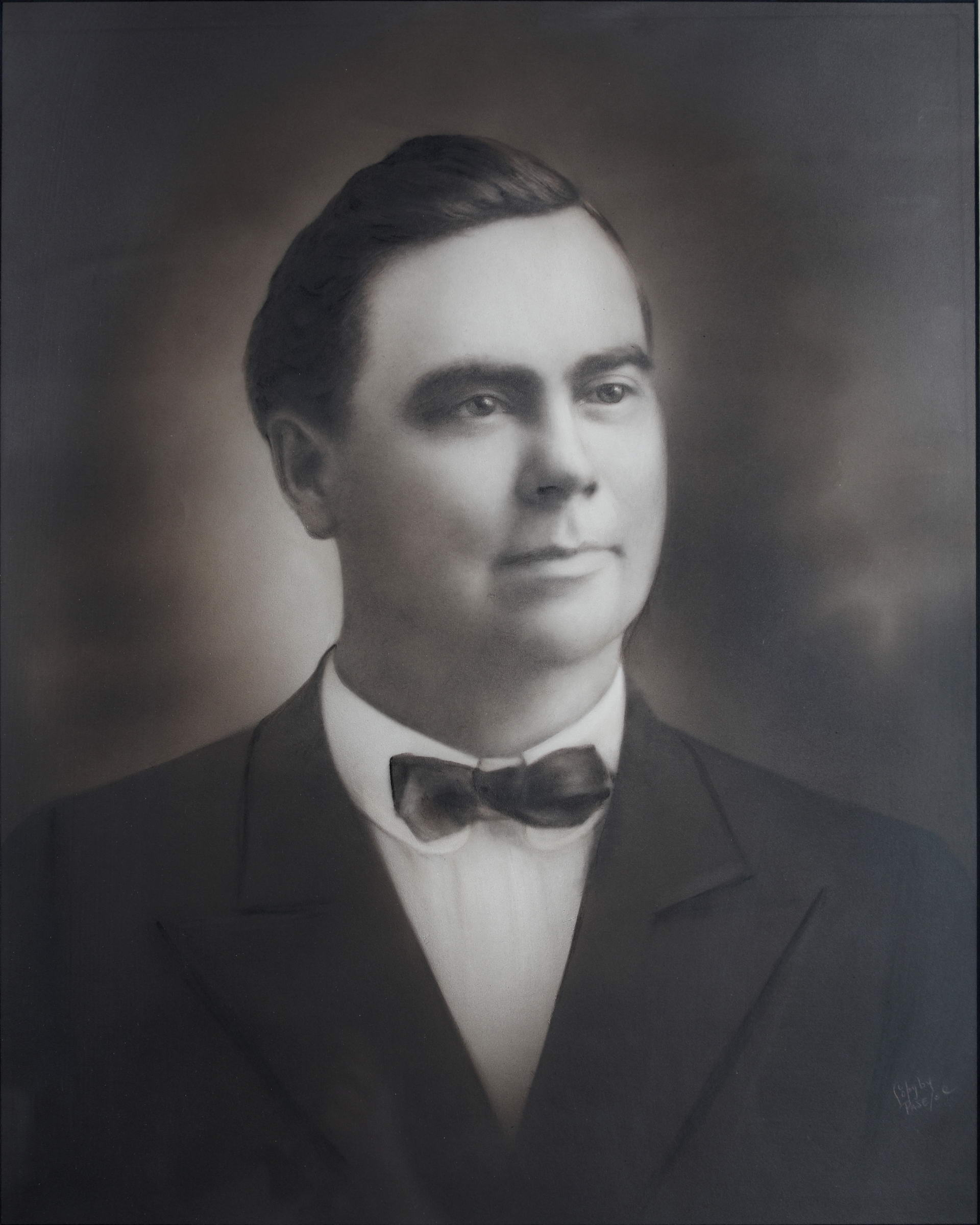
- Anthony 1907

3rd Speaker of the Oklahoma House of Representatives
- In office 1910 special session
- Preceded by: Benjamin Franklin Wilson
- Succeeded by: William A. Durant

Member of the Oklahoma House of Representatives Stephens County, Oklahoma
- In office 1907–1912
- Preceded by: Position established
- Succeeded by: O. M. Morris

Personal details
- Born: 9 January 1871 Bedford County, Tennessee, USA
- Died: 11 August 1933 (aged 62) Norman, Cleveland, Oklahoma, USA
- Party: Democratic

William Bruce "Bill" Anthony was an American politician who served in the Oklahoma House of Representatives from 1907 to 1912.

== Biography ==
W. B. Anthony was born on January 9, 1871 in Bedford County, Tennessee to Jacob Levi Allen Alexander Berry Gabbard "Jake" Anthony and Martha Malissa "Mattie" (Bruce) Anthony. He served in the Oklahoma House of Representatives from 1907 to 1912 representing Stephens County. He was a member of the Democratic Party. He was also the private secretary for Charles N. Haskell. On June 12, 1910, he participated in a scheme to move the State Seal of Oklahoma from Guthrie to Oklahoma City on Haskell's orders. He was the Speaker of the Oklahoma House of Representatives during the 1910 special session. He was appointed Chairman of the Oklahoma Capitol Building Commission. He died on August 11, 1933 in Norman, Cleveland, Oklahoma, USA.
