= J. J. Williams (Oklahoma politician) =

American politician (1867–1928)

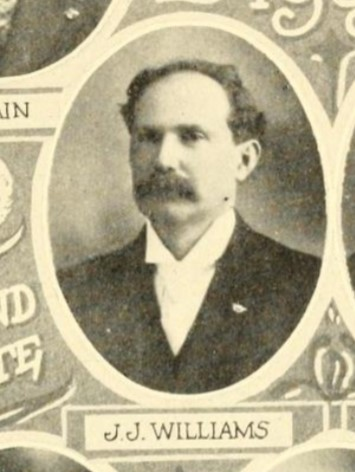

Member of the Oklahoma Senate from the 6th district
- In office November 16, 1907 – 1913 Serving with Richard Billups (1907-1911); George A. Coffrey (1911-1912); J. V. McClintic (1912-1913)
- Preceded by: Position established
- Succeeded by: James L. Austin

Personal details
- Born: April 8, 1867 Wheatland, Missouri, United States
- Died: May 17, 1928 (aged 61) Clinton, Oklahoma, United States
- Party: Democratic Party

J. J. Williams (April 8, 1867 – May 17, 1928) was an American politician who served in the Oklahoma Senate from statehood in 1907 until 1913.

== Biography ==
J. J. Williams was born on April 8, 1867, in Wheatland, Missouri. He attended Southwest Baptist University, Valparaiso University, and the University of Illinois and learned to be a medical doctor. He married Tena Milliken in 1892. He eventually settled in Weatherford, Oklahoma Territory, and helped found Southwestern Oklahoma State University's campus there. In 1905, he was elected mayor of Weatherford. A member of the Democratic Party, he was elected to the Oklahoma Senate as one of two representatives serving the 6th district at statehood. He initially served alongside Richard Billups until he was succeeded by George A. Coffrey in 1911. Coffey later resigned and was succeeded by J. V. McClintic in 1912. Williams left office in 1913 and was succeeded by James L. Austin. He died on May 17, 1928, in Clinton, Oklahoma.
