= J. Harvey Maxey Jr. =

American politician

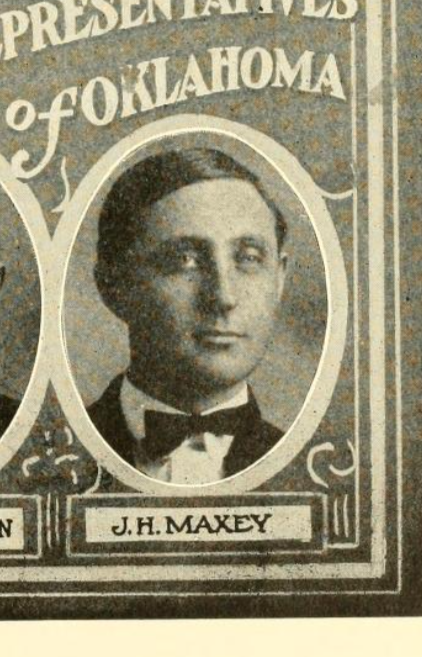
- Maxey before 1912

5th Speaker of the Oklahoma House of Representatives
- In office 1913–1915
- Preceded by: William A. Durant
- Succeeded by: Alonzo McCrory

Member of the Oklahoma House of Representatives
- In office 1909–1915
- Preceded by: H. G. Stettmund
- Succeeded by: R. L. Disney
- Constituency: Lincoln and Pottawatomie Counties (1909-1913); Muskogee County (1913-1915)

J. Harvey Maxey Jr. was an American politician who served as the 5th Speaker of the Oklahoma House of Representatives from 1913 to 1915. He served in the Oklahoma House of Representatives from 1909 to 1915.

== Biography ==
J. Harvey Maxey Jr. was named after his father J. Harvey Maxey, a member of the Oklahoma Constitutional Convention. He served in the Oklahoma House of Representatives representing Lincoln and Pottawatomie Counties from 1909 to 1913 as a member of the Democratic Party. He also represented Muskogee County from 1913 to 1915 while serving as the 5th Speaker of the Oklahoma House of Representatives. In the 1913 Speaker election, he defeated the Republican nominee E. J. Vosburgh of Woodward County with 77 to 18 votes. He ran for the United States House of Representatives in 1914. He placed third, and last, in the Democratic primary behind William Wirt Hastings and Campbell Russell.

== Electoral history ==
1914 Oklahoma's 2nd congressional district Democratic primary (August 4, 1914)
Party	Candidate	Votes	%
Democratic	William Wirt Hastings	6,052	44.7%
Democratic	Campbell Russell	4,761	35.2%
Democratic	J. Harvey Maxey Jr.	2,718	20.1%
Turnout		13531	
