= Thomas F. Memminger =

American politician

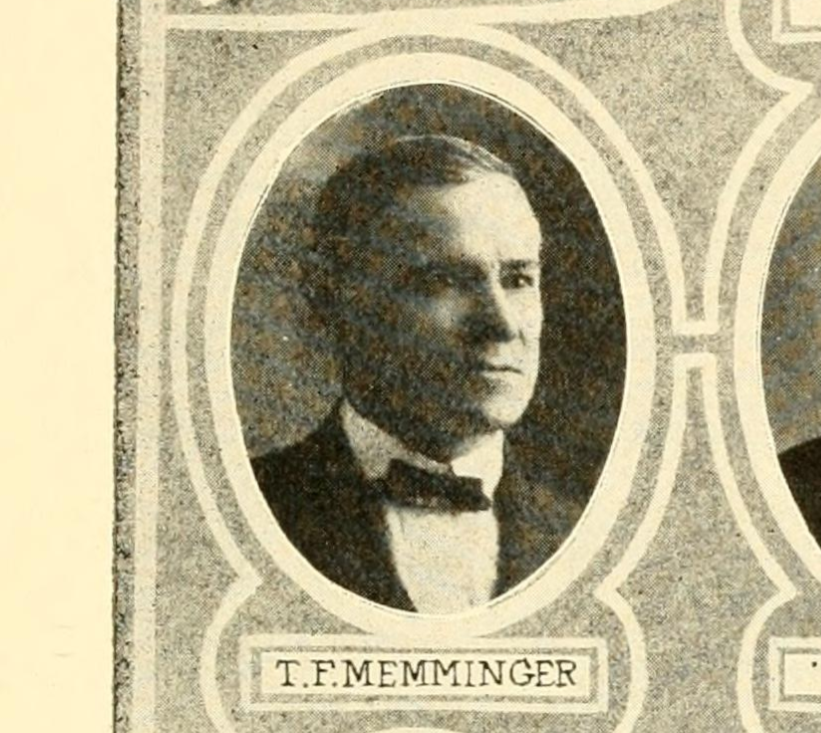
- Memminger before 1912

Member of the Oklahoma Senate from the 20th district
- In office 1922–1926
- Preceded by: Wilburn Cartwright
- Succeeded by: J. N. Nesbitt
- In office November 16, 1907 – 1914
- Preceded by: Position established
- Succeeded by: John R. Hickman

Member of the Nebraska House of Representatives
- In office 1903–1905
- In office 1899–1901

Personal details
- Born: August 22, 1859 Wheeling, Virginia, U.S.
- Died: March 30, 1927 (aged 67)
- Party: Democratic Party

Thomas F. Memminger (August 22, 1859 – March 30, 1927) was an American politician who served in the Nebraska House of Representatives and Oklahoma Senate.

== Early life, education, and family ==
Thomas F. Memminger was born on August 22, 1859, near Wheeling, Virginia, (now West Virginia) to William Memminger and Caroline Metzger. His parents were both first generation German Americans. He attended Frasher's Business College in Wheeling. He later moved to Clinton, Iowa, before settling in Madison County, Nebraska, in 1884. On October 28, 1890, he married Margaret Burrows and they had two children.

== Nebraska politics ==
In 1887, he was elected Madison County county treasurer and he was reelected in 1889. In 1895, he was hired as U.S. Senator William V. Allen's private secretary. In 1896, he was hired as president of various banks and Madison Publishing Company. He served in the Nebraska House of Representatives representing Madison County from 1899 to 1901 and from 1903 to 1905.

== Oklahoma politics and death ==
In 1905, he moved to Indian Territory living in Durant for a year before settling in Atoka. He was elected to the Oklahoma Senate at statehood in 1907 and served until 1914. He was reelected in 1922 and served until 1926. He was a delegate to the 1916 Democratic National Convention. He died on March 30, 1927.
