= Patrick James Goulding =

American politician

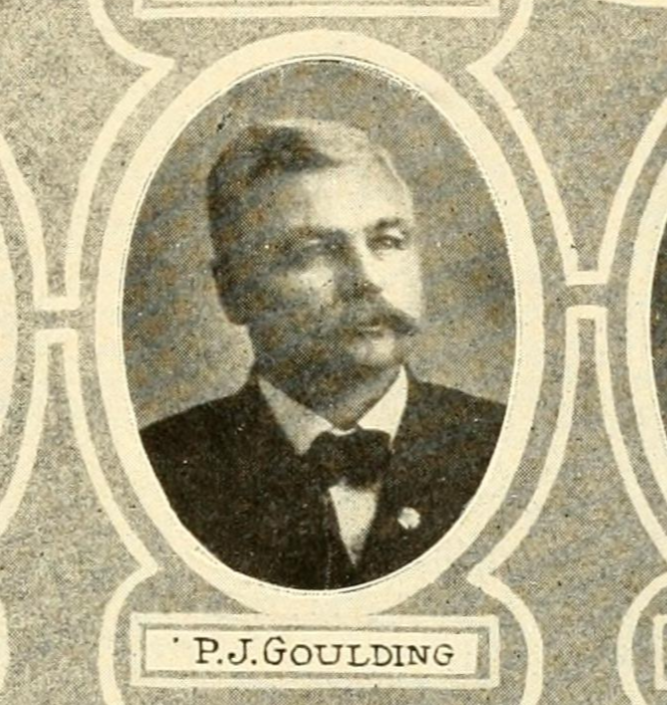
- Goulding before 1912

Member of the Oklahoma Senate from the 8th district
- In office November 16, 1907 – November 16, 1912
- Preceded by: Position established
- Succeeded by: Eugene Watrous

Personal details
- Born: March 5, 1862 Rochester, New York
- Died: May 4, 1918 (aged 56)
- Party: Democratic Party

Patrick James Goulding was an American politician who served in the Oklahoma Senate between 1907 and 1912.

== Biography ==
Patrick James Goulding was born into an Irish family on March 5, 1862, in Rochester, New York, to James A. Goulding and Anna F. McGlew. In 1867, the family moved to Iowa. He studied engineering before moving to Oklahoma Territory in 1893, claiming land near Enid. He was elected as a Democratic Party member of the Oklahoma Senate representing Enid at statehood in 1907. He served on the State Capitol Commission in 1913, helping plan the construction of the Oklahoma State Capitol. He died on May 4, 1918.
