= Emory Brownlee =

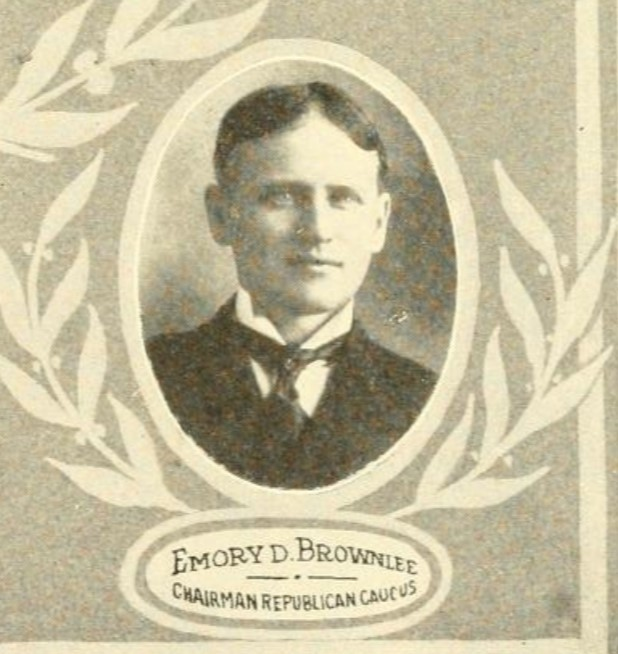

Member of the Oklahoma Senate from the 16th district
- In office November 16, 1907 – 1913
- Preceded by: Position established
- Succeeded by: E. J. Warner

Personal details
- Died: January 1, 1928 Kingfisher, Oklahoma, United States
- Party: Republican

Emory David Brownlee was an American politician who served in the Oklahoma Senate.

== Biography ==
Emory David Brownlee moved to Kingfisher, Oklahoma Territory, in 1889. He was an attorney and worked as the registrar for Oklahoma Territory's land office. A member of the Republican Party, Brownlee was elected to represent the 16th district of the Oklahoma Senate from 1907 to 1913. He was the Republican nominee for Oklahoma Corporation Commission in 1910 and for the United States House of Representatives in 1912. He died on January 1, 1928, in Kingfisher.

== Electoral history ==
1910 Oklahoma Corporation Commissioner election
Party	Candidate	Votes	%	±%
Democratic	George A. Henshaw	117,444	50.1%	−4.6%
Republican	Emory Brownlee	93,050	39.7%	−1.5%
Socialist	J. F. McDaniel	23,835	10.1%	+6.2%
Democratic hold		Swing		

1912 U.S. House of Representatives for Oklahoma's at-large districts general election
Party	Candidate	Votes	%
Democratic	William H. Murray	121,202	16.2%
Democratic	Claude Weaver	121,186	16.2%
Democratic	Joseph B. Thompson	120,346	16.1%
Republican	Alvin D. Allen	87,409	11.7%
Republican	James L. Brown	87,264	11.7%
Republican	Emory Brownlee	86,092	11.5%
Socialist	Oscar Ameringer	41,229	5.5%
Socialist	J. T. Cumbie	41,070	5.5%
Socialist	J. Luther Langston	41,020	5.5%
Democratic gain from		Swing	N/A
