= Joseph B. Thompson =

American politician

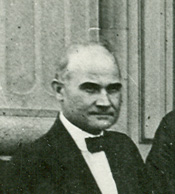

Member of the U.S. House of Representatives from Oklahoma
- In office March 3, 1913 – September 18, 1919
- Preceded by: District created
- Succeeded by: John W. Harreld
- Constituency: at-large (Seat B) (1913–1915); 5th district (1915–1919)

Member of the Oklahoma Senate
- In office 1912–1913
- Preceded by: Jessee Hatchett
- Succeeded by: J. T. McIntosh
- In office 1910–1912
- Preceded by: H. S. Blair
- Succeeded by: J. T. McIntosh
- Constituency: 19th district (1910-1912); 20th district (1912-1913)

Personal details
- Born: Joseph Bryan Thompson; April 29, 1871 Sherman, Texas
- Died: September 18, 1919 (aged 48) Martinsburg, West Virginia
- Party: Democratic Party
- Spouse: Mary Miller Thompson
- Children: James Miller Thompson; Joseph B. Thompson, Jr.
- Education: Savoy College

Joseph Bryan Thompson (April 29, 1871 – September 18, 1919) was an American politician and a U.S. representative from Oklahoma.

== Biography ==
Born near Sherman, Texas, Thompson attended the public schools, and was graduated from Savoy College in Fannin County, Texas, in 1890. He studied law, and was admitted to the bar in 1892 and commenced practice in Purcell, Indian Territory. He moved to Ardmore, Indian Territory. Thompson married Mary Miller, and they raised two sons, James Miller Thompson and Joseph B. Thompson Jr.

== Career ==
Appointed commissioner for the United States court in 1893, Thompson returned to Purcell, Indian Territory. He resigned in 1897 and moved to Pauls Valley and resumed the practice of law. He served as delegate to the Democratic National Conventions in 1900, 1904, and 1908, and as member of the Democratic Territorial committee from 1896 to 1904. He was chairman of the Democratic State committee in 1906 and 1908, and served in the State senate from 1910 to 1914.

Thompson was elected as a Democrat to the 63rd Congress and to the three succeeding Congresses and served from March 4, 1913, until his death.

== Death ==
On September 18, 1919, Thompson died of heart failure induced by Bright's disease while on a train near Martinsburg, West Virginia en route to his home at Pauls Valley, Oklahoma. He is interred at Mount Olivet Cemetery, Pauls Valley, Oklahoma.

== See also ==
- List of members of the United States Congress who died in office (1900–1949)

U.S. House of Representatives
Preceded by None	Member of the U.S. House of Representatives from Oklahoma's at-large congressional seat 1913–1915	Succeeded by At-large district eliminated
Preceded by Scott Ferris	Member of the U.S. House of Representatives from Oklahoma's 5th congressional district 1915–1919	Succeeded by John W. Harreld
