= Edwin Sorrells =

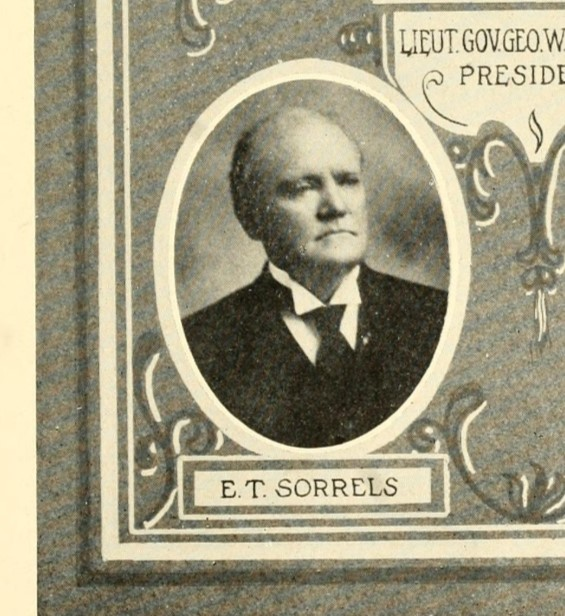

Member of the Oklahoma Senate from the 21st district
- In office 1907–1915
- Preceded by: Position established
- Succeeded by: M. M. Ryan

Personal details
- Born: October 30, 1854 Sebastian County, Arkansas, United States
- Died: May 4, 1922 (aged 67) Wilburton, Oklahoma, United States
- Party: Democratic Party

Edwin Theodore Sorrells (October 30, 1854 – May 4, 1922) was an American politician who served in the Oklahoma Senate from 1907 to 1915.

== Biography ==
Edwin Theodore Sorrells was born on October 30, 1854, in Sebastian County, Arkansas, to George Washington Sorrells and Charlotte Smedley. On March 9, 1879, he married Rachel Bloodworth and the couple moved to Indian Territory. He was elected to the Oklahoma Constitutional Convention. He was elected to the Oklahoma Senate representing the 21st district from statehood in 1907 until 1915. A member of the Democratic Party, he was succeeded in office by M. M. Ryan. He ran for Lieutenant Governor of Oklahoma in the 1914 Oklahoma elections, but lost the Democratic primary. In 1916, he was elected county commissioner for Latimer County. He died on May 4, 1922, in Wilburton, Oklahoma.
