= 1907 Oklahoma gubernatorial election =

- September 17, 1907
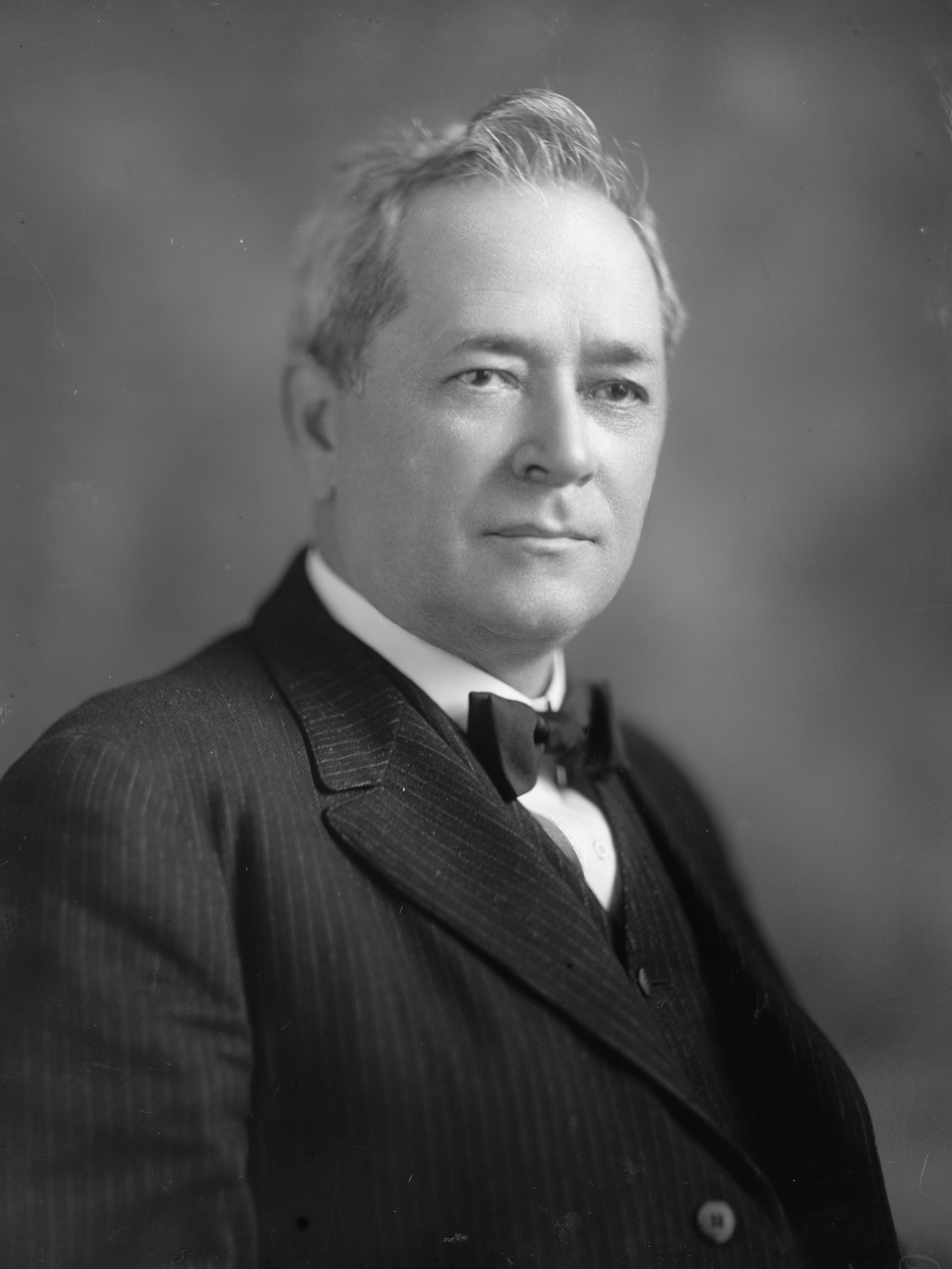

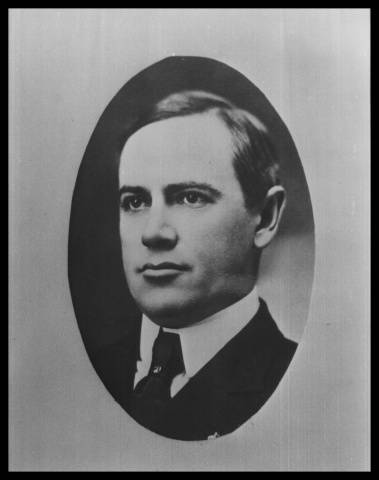
Nominee	Charles N. Haskell	Frank Frantz
Party	Democratic	Republican
Popular vote	134,162	106,507
Percentage	53.58%	42.53%
- County results Haskell: 40–50% 50–60% 60–70% 70–80% 80–90% Frantz: 40–50% 50–60%
Governor before election
Frank Frantz
as Territorial Governor
Republican
Elected Governor
Charles N. Haskell
Democratic

The 1907 Oklahoma gubernatorial election was held on September 17, 1907, and was the inaugural race for Governor of Oklahoma. Democrat Charles N. Haskell defeated Republican Frank Frantz, the territorial governor. Also on the ballot was C. C. Ross of the Socialist Party.

Oklahoma joined the Union as the 46th state on November 16, 1907. Haskell and all other new state officers elected at this general election took office on that date.

== Results ==
1907 Oklahoma gubernatorial election
Party	Candidate	Votes	%
Democratic	Charles N. Haskell	134,162	53.58%
Republican	Frank Frantz (incumbent)	106,507	42.53%
Socialist	C. C. Ross	9,740	3.89%
Majority		27,655	11.04%
Total votes		250,409	100.00%
Democratic gain from Republican			

=== Results by county ===
After this election, neither Muskogee County nor Sequoyah County would vote for a Republican again until 2010.

County	Charles N. Haskell Democratic		Frank Frantz Republican		C. C. Ross Socialist		Margin		Total votes cast
County	#	%	#	%	#	%	#	%	Total votes cast
Adair	922	56.01%	718	43.62%	6	0.36%	204	12.39%	1,646
Alfalfa	1,323	42.09%	1,698	54.02%	122	3.88%	-375	-11.93%	3,143
Atoka	1,261	57.06%	851	38.51%	98	4.43%	410	18.55%	2,210
Beaver	1,245	48.09%	1,235	47.70%	109	4.21%	10	0.39%	2,589
Beckham	2,010	66.96%	778	25.92%	214	7.13%	1,232	41.04%	3,002
Blaine	1,469	43.49%	1,735	51.36%	174	5.15%	-266	-7.87%	3,378
Bryan	2,923	66.12%	1,234	27.91%	264	5.97%	1,689	38.20%	4,421
Caddo	3,161	50.69%	2,873	46.07%	202	3.24%	288	4.62%	6,236
Canadian	2,102	52.72%	1,790	44.90%	95	2.38%	312	7.83%	3,987
Carter	2,672	59.82%	1,543	34.54%	252	5.64%	1,129	25.27%	4,467
Cherokee	1,248	51.27%	1,161	47.70%	25	1.03%	87	3.57%	2,434
Choctaw	1,554	54.95%	1,167	41.27%	107	3.78%	387	13.68%	2,828
Cimarron	540	56.25%	397	41.35%	23	2.40%	143	14.90%	960
Cleveland	1,853	56.95%	1,188	36.51%	213	6.55%	665	20.44%	3,254
Coal	1,377	59.12%	705	30.27%	247	10.61%	672	28.85%	2,329
Comanche	3,133	53.44%	2,538	43.29%	192	3.27%	595	10.15%	5,863
Craig	1,671	52.60%	1,479	46.55%	27	0.85%	192	6.04%	3,177
Creek	1,302	44.27%	1,551	52.74%	88	2.99%	-249	-8.47%	2,941
Custer	1,930	53.40%	1,523	42.14%	161	4.45%	407	11.26%	3,614
Delaware	1,003	62.03%	589	36.43%	25	1.55%	414	25.60%	1,617
Dewey	1,179	44.36%	1,137	42.78%	342	12.87%	42	1.58%	2,658
Ellis	1,326	48.08%	1,328	48.15%	104	3.77%	-2	-0.07%	2,758
Garfield	2,219	39.41%	3,237	57.49%	175	3.11%	-1,018	-18.08%	5,631
Garvin	2,772	68.18%	1,239	30.47%	55	1.35%	1,533	37.70%	4,066
Grady	2,981	69.42%	1,243	28.95%	70	1.63%	1,738	40.48%	4,294
Grant	1,799	49.76%	1,729	47.83%	87	2.41%	70	1.94%	3,615
Greer	2,151	67.47%	864	27.10%	173	5.43%	1,287	40.37%	3,188
Harper	729	46.88%	735	47.27%	91	5.85%	-6	-0.39%	1,555
Haskell	1,804	56.13%	1,319	41.04%	91	2.83%	485	15.09%	3,214
Hughes	1,965	59.37%	1,256	37.95%	89	2.69%	709	21.42%	3,310
Jackson	2,143	75.43%	604	21.26%	94	3.31%	1,539	54.17%	2,841
Jefferson	1,543	69.85%	594	26.89%	72	3.26%	949	42.96%	2,209
Johnston	1,944	66.71%	757	25.98%	213	7.31%	1,187	40.73%	2,914
Kay	2,651	50.02%	2,562	48.34%	87	1.64%	89	1.68%	5,300
Kingfisher	1,688	42.35%	2,204	55.29%	94	2.36%	-516	-12.95%	3,986
Kiowa	2,610	61.14%	1,529	35.82%	130	3.05%	1,081	25.32%	4,269
Latimer	969	58.16%	629	37.76%	68	4.08%	340	20.41%	1,666
Le Flore	2,162	54.60%	1,715	43.31%	83	2.10%	447	11.29%	3,960
Lincoln	3,432	47.57%	3,562	49.38%	220	3.05%	-130	-1.80%	7,214
Logan	2,179	35.76%	3,831	62.87%	84	1.38%	-1,652	-27.11%	6,094
Love	1,199	67.47%	491	27.63%	87	4.90%	708	39.84%	1,777
Major	968	37.72%	1,296	50.51%	302	11.77%	-328	-12.78%	2,566
Marshall	1,248	64.56%	467	24.16%	218	11.28%	781	40.40%	1,933
Mayes	1,215	57.02%	908	42.61%	8	0.38%	307	14.41%	2,131
McClain	1,465	63.72%	723	31.45%	111	4.83%	742	32.27%	2,299
McCurtain	1,287	55.88%	955	41.47%	61	2.65%	332	14.42%	2,303
McIntosh	1,666	50.24%	1,607	48.46%	43	1.30%	59	1.78%	3,316
Murray	1,356	69.50%	502	25.73%	93	4.77%	854	43.77%	1,951
Muskogee (Note: The return from this county was rejected by the canvassing board on account of perceived irregularities.)	3,479	47.46%	3,789	51.68%	63	0.86%	-310	-4.23%	7,331
Noble	1,459	48.41%	1,494	49.57%	61	2.02%	-35	-1.16%	3,014
Nowata	1,068	51.27%	992	47.62%	23	1.10%	76	3.65%	2,083
Okfuskee	1,125	51.51%	878	40.20%	181	8.29%	247	11.31%	2,184
Oklahoma	5,038	44.51%	5,944	52.51%	337	2.98%	-906	-8.00%	11,319
Okmulgee	1,287	43.94%	1,502	51.28%	140	4.78%	-215	-7.34%	2,929
Osage	1,693	54.61%	1,357	43.77%	50	1.61%	336	10.84%	3,100
Ottawa	1,305	50.33%	1,245	48.01%	43	1.66%	60	2.31%	2,593
Pawnee	1,714	49.25%	1,599	45.95%	167	4.80%	115	3.30%	3,480
Payne	2,261	49.77%	2,093	46.07%	189	4.16%	168	3.70%	4,543
Pittsburg	3,366	54.29%	2,602	41.97%	232	3.74%	764	12.32%	6,200
Pontotoc	2,328	67.93%	855	24.95%	244	7.12%	1,473	42.98%	3,427
Pottawatomie	4,210	57.26%	2,911	39.59%	232	3.16%	1,299	17.67%	7,353
Pushmataha	864	60.46%	520	36.39%	45	3.15%	344	24.07%	1,429
Roger Mills	1,290	54.09%	854	35.81%	241	10.10%	436	18.28%	2,385
Rogers	1,759	60.53%	1,116	38.40%	31	1.07%	643	22.13%	2,906
Seminole	1,396	51.92%	1,101	40.94%	192	7.14%	295	10.97%	2,689
Sequoyah	1,927	49.38%	1,940	49.72%	35	0.90%	-13	-0.33%	3,902
Stephens	2,205	67.93%	710	21.87%	331	10.20%	1,495	46.06%	3,246
Texas	1,576	52.27%	1,353	44.88%	86	2.85%	223	7.40%	3,015
Tillman	1,472	70.91%	557	26.83%	47	2.26%	915	44.08%	2,076
Tulsa	2,163	51.20%	1,951	46.18%	111	2.63%	212	5.02%	4,225
Wagoner	1,200	40.23%	1,723	57.76%	60	2.01%	-523	-17.53%	2,983
Washington	1,404	48.51%	1,442	49.83%	48	1.66%	-38	-1.31%	2,894
Washita	2,100	60.31%	1,152	33.08%	230	6.61%	948	27.23%	3,482
Woods	1,276	44.57%	1,424	49.74%	163	5.69%	-148	-5.17%	2,863
Woodward	1,327	44.61%	1,416	47.60%	232	7.80%	-89	-2.99%	2,975
Totals (Note: The totals do not include the rejected votes from Muskogee County.)	134,162	53.58%	106,507	42.53%	9,740	3.89%	27,655	11.04%	250,409

== See also ==
- 1907 Oklahoma elections
