= 1907 Oklahoma elections =

- September 17, 1907

The 1907 Oklahoma elections were held on September 17, 1907, to elect every political office in the soon-to-be-formed U.S. State of Oklahoma. The elections took place in Indian Territory and Oklahoma Territory.

== Federal elections ==
=== Senate ===
State	Incumbent			Results	Candidates
State	Senator	Party	Electoral history	Results	Candidates
Oklahoma (Class 2)	New state			First senator elected December 10, 1907. Democratic gain.	▌ ✓ Robert L. Owen (Democratic) 128 votes; ▌Clarence B. Douglas (Republican) 22 votes; ▌C. B. Jones (Republican) 22 votes
Oklahoma (Class 3)	New state			First senator elected December 10, 1907. Democratic gain.	▌ ✓ Thomas Gore (Democratic) 128 votes; ▌Clarence B. Douglas (Republican) 22 votes; ▌C. B. Jones (Republican) 22 votes

=== House ===
1907 United States House of Representatives elections in Oklahoma
Party	Votes	Percentage	Seats Before	Seats After	+/–
Democratic	136,171	56.02%	0	4	+4
Republican	101,841	41.89%	0	1	+1
Socialist	5,083	2.09%	0	0	0
Totals	243,095	100.00%	0	5	+5

District	Status	
District	Status	Candidates
Oklahoma 's 1 st congressional district	First representative elected November 16, 1907. Republican gain.	▌ ✓ Bird Segle McGuire (Republican) 50.3%; ▌ William L. Eagleton (Democratic) 47.3%; ▌ Achilles W. Renshaw (Socialist) 2.4%
Oklahoma 's 2 nd congressional district	First representative elected November 16, 1907. Democratic gain.	▌ ✓ Elmer L. Fulton (Democratic) 50.9%; ▌ Thompson Benton Ferguson (Republican) 49.1%
Oklahoma 's 3 rd congressional district	First representative elected November 16, 1907. Democratic gain.	▌ ✓ James S. Davenport (Democratic) 52.7%; ▌ Frank C. Hubbard (Republican) 47.3%
Oklahoma 's 4 th congressional district	First representative elected November 16, 1907. Democratic gain.	▌ ✓ Charles D. Carter (Democratic) 62.4%; ▌ Loren G. Disney (Republican) 33.2%; ▌J. T. Cumbie (Socialist) 4.3%
Oklahoma 's 5 th congressional district	First representative elected November 16, 1907. Democratic gain.	▌ ✓ Scott Ferris (Democratic) 66.2%; ▌ Henry D. McKnight (Republican) 29.9%; ▌ Wood Hubbard (Republican) 3.9%

== State elections ==
=== Governor ===
1907 Oklahoma gubernatorial election
Party	Candidate	Votes	%	±%
Democratic	Charles N. Haskell	134,162	53.5	New
Republican	Frank Frantz	106,507	42.5	New
Socialist	C.C. Ross	9,740	3.8	New
Democratic gain from		Swing	N/A	

=== Lieutenant Governor ===
1907 Oklahoma lieutenant gubernatorial election
Party	Candidate	Votes	%	±%
Democratic	George W. Bellamy	132,568	54.7	New
Republican	N.G. Turk	100,106	41.3	New
Socialist	M.H. Carey	9,662	3.9	New
Democratic gain from		Swing	N/A	

=== Secretary of State ===
1907 Oklahoma Secretary of State election
Party	Candidate	Votes	%	±%
Democratic	William Macklin Cross	133,504	54.8	New
Republican	Thomas M. Robnett	100,159	41.1	New
Socialist	J.G. Watrus	9,601	3.9	New
Democratic gain from		Swing	N/A	

=== State Auditor ===
1907 Oklahoma State Auditor election
Party	Candidate	Votes	%	±%
Democratic	Martin E. Trapp	132,590	54.5	New
Republican	J.E. Dyche	99,904	41.1	New
Socialist	A.B. Davis	10,454	4.3	New
Democratic gain from		Swing	N/A	

=== Attorney General ===
1907 Oklahoma attorney general election
Party	Candidate	Votes	%	±%
Democratic	Charles West	131,055	54.5	New
Republican	Silas H. Reid	99,543	41.4	New
Socialist	E.T. Marsh	9,534	3.9	New
Democratic gain from		Swing	N/A	

=== State Treasurer ===
1907 Oklahoma State Treasurer election
Party	Candidate	Votes	%	±%
Democratic	James Menefee	132,496	54.7	New
Republican	Mortimer F. Stillwell	100,137	41.4	New
Socialist	John B. Ash	9,286	3.8	New
Democratic gain from		Swing	N/A	

=== State Superintendent of Public Instruction ===
1907 Oklahoma State Superintendent election
Party	Candidate	Votes	%	±%
Democratic	Evan Dhu Cameron	132,962	54.8	New
Republican	Calvin Ballard	99,912	41.1	New
Socialist	Joseph A. Hanna	9,678	3.9	New
Democratic gain from		Swing	N/A	

=== State Examiner and Inspector ===
1907 Oklahoma State Examiner election
Party	Candidate	Votes	%	±%
Democratic	Charles A. Taylor	132,821	54.8	New
Republican	John S. Fischer	99,600	41.1	New
Socialist	C.H. Done	9,555	3.9	New
Democratic gain from		Swing	N/A	

=== Chief Mine Inspector ===
1907 Oklahoma Chief Mine Inspector election
Party	Candidate	Votes	%	±%
Democratic	Pete Hanraty	132,821	54.8	New
Republican	David Halstead	99,596	41.1	New
Socialist	David Henderson	9,610	3.9	New
Democratic gain from		Swing	N/A	

=== Commissioner of Labor ===
1907 Oklahoma Commissioner of Labor election
Party	Candidate	Votes	%	±%
Democratic	Charles L. Daugherty	132,777	54.8	New
Republican	A.D. Murlin	99,380	41.0	New
Socialist	J.W. Shaw	9,766	4.0	New
Democratic gain from		Swing	N/A	

=== Commissioner of Charities and Corrections ===
1907 Oklahoma Commissioner of Charities and Corrections election
Party	Candidate	Votes	%	±%
Democratic	Kate Barnard	134,300	55.2	New
Republican	Haxel Tomlinson	98,960	40.7	New
Socialist	Kate Richards O'Hare	9,615	3.9	New
Democratic gain from		Swing	N/A	

=== Commissioner of Insurance ===
1907 Oklahoma Commissioner of Insurance election
Party	Candidate	Votes	%	±%
Democratic	T. J. McComb	132,405	54.7	New
Republican	Michael Burke	99,697	41.2	New
Socialist	Thomas G. Toler	9,571	3.9	New
Democratic gain from		Swing	N/A	

=== Clerk of the Supreme Court of Oklahoma ===
1907 Oklahoma Clerk of the Supreme Court of Oklahoma election
Party	Candidate	Votes	%	±%
Democratic	Swamp Campbell	132,597	55.0	New
Republican	J.W. Speake	99,227	41.1	New
Socialist	J.V. Kolachny	9,049	3.7	New
Democratic gain from		Swing	N/A	

=== Corporation Commission ===
1907 Oklahoma Corporation Commission election
Party	Candidate	Votes	%	±%
Democratic	J.E. Love	132,762	54.9	New
Republican	John Jenson	99,386	41.1	New
Socialist	E.C. Deberry	9,608	3.9	New
Democratic gain from		Swing	N/A	

1907 Oklahoma Corporation Commission election
Party	Candidate	Votes	%	±%
Democratic	J.J. McAlester	132,373	54.7	New
Republican	Patrick J. Dore	99,547	41.2	New
Socialist	A.T. Reeves	9,639	3.9	New
Democratic gain from		Swing	N/A	

1907 Oklahoma Corporation Commission election
Party	Candidate	Votes	%	±%
Democratic	A.P. Watson	132,123	54.9	New
Republican	D.A. Crafton	99,109	41.1	New
Socialist	Roy Hays	9,423	3.9	New
Democratic gain from		Swing	N/A	

=== Supreme Court Justices ===
1907 Oklahoma Supreme Court District 1 election
Party	Candidate	Votes	%	±%
Democratic	John B. Turner	132,821	57.2	New
Republican	Ralph E. Campbell	99,302	42.7	New
Democratic gain from		Swing	N/A	

1907 Oklahoma Supreme Court District 2 election
Party	Candidate	Votes	%	±%
Democratic	Robert L. Williams	132,588	57.0	New
Republican	W. H. Johnston	99,728	42.9	New
Democratic gain from		Swing	N/A	

1907 Oklahoma Supreme Court District 3 election
Party	Candidate	Votes	%	±%
Democratic	Matthew John Kane	132,433	57.0	New
Republican	John H. Cotterall	99,655	42.9	New
Democratic gain from		Swing	N/A	

1907 Oklahoma Supreme Court District 4 election
Party	Candidate	Votes	%	±%
Democratic	Samuel W. Hayes	131,902	54.8	New
Republican	Frank E. Gillette	99,715	41.4	New
Socialist	A.L. Loudermilk	9,078	3.7	New
Democratic gain from		Swing	N/A	

1907 Oklahoma Supreme Court District 5 election
Party	Candidate	Votes	%	±%
Democratic	Jesse James Dunn	130,050	56.5	New
Republican	D.A. Crafton	99,869	43.4	New
Democratic gain from		Swing	N/A	

== See also ==
- 1st Oklahoma Legislature
