= J. J. McAlester =

American politician (1842–1920)

James Jackson McAlester
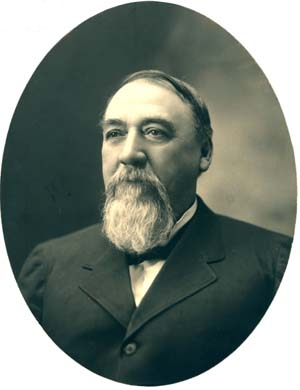

2nd Lieutenant Governor of Oklahoma
- In office January 9, 1911 – January 11, 1915
- Governor: Lee Cruce
- Preceded by: George W. Bellamy
- Succeeded by: Martin E. Trapp

Oklahoma Corporation Commissioner
- In office November 16, 1907 – January 9, 1911
- Governor: Charles N. Haskell
- Preceded by: Position established
- Succeeded by: George A. Henshaw

United States Marshal for Indian Territory's Central District
- In office March 1, 1895 – April 19, 1897
- Preceded by: Position established
- Succeeded by: Jasper P. Grady

United States Marshal for Indian Territory
- In office April 6, 1893 – March 1, 1895
- Preceded by: Thomas B. Needles
- Succeeded by: Position replaced with multiple districts

Personal details
- Born: October 1, 1842 Sebastian County, Arkansas, U.S.
- Died: September 21, 1920 (aged 77) McAlester, Oklahoma, U.S.
- Party: Democratic Party
- Spouse: Rebecca Burney
- Relatives: Benjamin Burney (brother-in-law)

Military service
- Allegiance: Confederate States of America
- Branch/service: Confederate States Army
- Rank: Captain
- Battles/wars: American Civil War; Battle of Pea Ridge

James Jackson McAlester (October 1, 1842 – September 21, 1920) was an American coal baron and politician active in Indian Territory and later Oklahoma. He served as a United States Marshal for Indian Territory from 1893 to 1897, one of three members of the first Oklahoma Corporation Commission from 1907 to 1911, and as the second lieutenant governor of Oklahoma from 1911 to 1915.

McAlester was born in Arkansas in 1842, and enlisted in the Confederate States Army during the American Civil War. After the war, he received a detailed survey of coal deposits within the Choctaw Nation in Indian Territory and traveled there to work as a trader. He later married Rebecca Burney, sister of Chickasaw Governor Benjamin Burney, which granted him citizenship in the Chickasaw Nation and Choctaw Nation. He used his tribal citizenship to claim lands that contained valuable coal deposits, allowing him to become incredibly wealthy and influential in the territory.

He owned a general store in an area that eventually grew into the town of McAlester, Oklahoma, named after J. J., and he owned substantial interests in coal mining operation in the area, leading him into conflict with the Choctaw Nation's government. Chief Coleman Cole ordered McAlester's execution for violating tribal law preventing the sale of "part of the land" during his tenure, but McAlester was able to escape his sentence and resumed his activities after Cole's term. He built the McAlester House, which was listed on the National Register of Historic Places in 1980.

In the lead up to Oklahoma statehood McAlester was elected to the first Oklahoma Corporation Commission and in 1910 he was elected lieutenant governor of Oklahoma and he served until 1915. He died in 1920.

== Early life, military career, and family ==
McAlester was born in Sebastian County, Arkansas, on October 1, 1842, and grew up in Ft. Smith, Arkansas. He joined the Confederate States Army at the start of the war and reached the rank of captain. He fought at the Battle of Pea Ridge. After the defeat of the Confederacy he returned to Ft. Smith where he met engineer Oliver Weldon who gave him details of the location of coal deposits in Indian Territory (near now-McAlester, Oklahoma). In 1866 he moved to the Choctaw Nation and worked for the trading companies "Harlan and Rooks" and "Reynolds and Hannaford," before buying out the later.

On August 22, 1872, he married Rebecca Burney (born 1841 in Mississippi - died May 5, 1919, in Oklahoma) a member of the Chickasaw Nation and they had five children. Burney was the sister of Chickasaw Governor Benjamin Burney. This made it possible for him to gain citizenship in and the right to own property in both the Choctaw and Chickasaw nations.

== Business Career and founding McAlester ==
By 1870, McAlester was running his own business at the "Crossroads" in Indian Territory, which later became McAlester, Oklahoma. He sold everyday goods and tools, and provided a stable supply of imported manufactured goods to Choctaw people in the area. He lobbied Missouri–Kansas–Texas Railroad to bring the railroad through the Crossroads with trains first arriving in 1872. His role in bringing the railroads to the area led to the first post office for the area being dubbed "McAlester."

Using the knowledge he had gotten from Weldon, McAlester was able to make many lucrative coal claims in the area and to establish what eventually became McAlester Coal Mining Co. Since there was not enough labor in the Choctaw Nation to support the growing coal industry, immigrant workers from the United States and Europe were recruited to work in the mines, including a large Carpatho-Russian community.

His trading company, J. J. McAlester Mercantile Company, was the unofficial company store for some miners since portions of their pay was issued in the form of scrip redeemable only at the store. Some miners pay was also directly paid from the company to McAlester to cover debts or as store credit. A review of his stores sale logs show price discrepancies between customers purchasing the same item, indicating some price discrimination, but no clear pattern of discrimination was determined.

McAlester's selling of coal caused conflict with Choctaw Nation Chief Coleman Cole. Under Choctaw law, any tribal citizen who sold "part of the land" was to be sentenced to death and Cole interpreted the coal sales as a violation of the law. After McAlester was arrested by Choctaw Lighthorse alongside two other intermarried whites, the three men escaped. McAlester claimed he later messaged Cole and settled the dispute, while other accounts say he lived in exile in the Muscogee Nation until the end of Cole's term in 1878. (Note: Paul Nesbitt wrote that McAlester settled the dispute with Cole, citing McAlester; John Bartlett Meserve wrote that McAlester lived in the Muscogee Nation the remainder of Cole's term.) In the 1880s, Green McCurtain led an unsuccessful effort to nationalize the Choctaw Nation's coal deposits.

== U.S. Marshall and Oklahoma Corporation Commission ==
On April 6, 1893, President Grover Cleveland appointed McAlester U.S. Marshal for Indian Territory and he served until March 1, 1895, when he became the U.S. Marshall for Indian Territory's Central District until April 19, 1897. He was elected to the Oklahoma Corporation Commission and took office in 1907. He did not run for reelection in 1910, instead running for Lieutenant Governor of Oklahoma.

== Lt. Governor of Oklahoma and death ==
As a member of the Democratic Party he was elected as Lieutenant Governor of Oklahoma with 118,544 votes (49.3%), winning against Republican candidate and former Choctaw chief Gilbert Dukes with 94,621 votes (39.4%), with Socialist candidate John G. Wills reaching nearly 10%. During his tenure McAlester had the occasion to serve as acting governor of Oklahoma, during the absence of Governor Lee Cruce from the state, as evidenced by a pardon he issued in 1915 in the case of Sibenaler v. State (1915 OK CR 45).

He died on September 21, 1920, in McAlester. He is buried in the Masonic Section of Oak Hill Cemetery.

== Legacy ==
McAlester House, J. J. McAlester's home in McAlester, Oklahoma, was listed on the National Register of Historic Places listings in Pittsburg County, Oklahoma in 1980. One of his daughters, Sudie McAlester, married Choctaw Chief Victor Locke Jr. A 2.5-ton chunk of coal sits from McAlester's mines was displayed at the 1921 World's fair, left in his yard for several years, and then given to McAlester High School where it has been displayed outdoors since the mid-1980s.

=== Analysis by historians ===
Historians' opinions of McAlester have shifted over time. Early to mid-twentieth century scholarship on his legacy was more likely to view him as a frontier businessman bringing civilization to Indian Territory, while later scholarship is more critical of his exploitation of Choctaw law and the effects of his business on the Choctaw Nation. Historian Linda English described him as an "ambitious man who continually demonstrated his commitment to progress."

=== In popular culture ===
J. J. McAlester's store served as the basis for the store visited by U.S. Marshal Rooster Cogburn in the 1968 novel True Grit by Charles Portis (and the subsequent 1969 and 2010 feature film versions).

== Electoral history ==
1907 Oklahoma Corporation Commission elections
Party	Candidate	Votes	%	±%
Democratic	J.J. McAlester	132,373	54.7	New
Republican	Patrick J. Dore	99,547	41.2	New
Socialist	A.T. Reeves	9,639	3.9	New
Democratic gain from		Swing	N/A	

Oklahoma lieutenant gubernatorial Democratic primary (August 2, 1910)
Party	Candidate	Votes	%
Democratic	J.J. McAlester	33,064	30.2%
Democratic	Frank P. Davis	24,104	22.0%
Democratic	J. M. Postelle	14,747	13.4%
Democratic	P. P. Duffy.	13,388	12.2%
Democratic	P. J. Yeager	10,524	9.6%
Democratic	Albert H. Ellis	9,699	8.8%
Democratic	Robert L. Notson	3,870	3.5%
Turnout		109,396	

Results by county McAlester: 40–50%; 50–60%; 60–70%; 70–80%; Dukes: 40–50%; 50–60%; 60–70%

1910 Oklahoma lieutenant gubernatorial election
Party	Candidate	Votes	%	±%
Democratic	J.J. McAlester	118,544	49.3%	−5.4%
Republican	Gilbert Dukes	94,621	39.3%	−2.0%
Socialist	John G. Wills	23,974	9.9%	+6.0%
Prohibition	I.A. Briggs	3,136	1.3%	New
Democratic hold		Swing		

== Works cited ==
- English, Linda C. (Spring 2003). "Inside the Store, Inside the Past: A Cultural Analysis of McAlester's General Store" (PDF). Chronicles of Oklahoma. 81 (1): 34–53.
- Hightower, Michael J. (Spring 1984). "Cattle, Coal and Indian Land: A Tradition of Mining in Southeastern Oklahoma" (PDF). Chronicles of Oklahoma. 62 (1): 4–25.
- Hightower, Michael J. (Summer 2024). "Old Reliable: The First National Bank of McAlester and the Extraordinary Legacy of Clark and Wanda Bass". Chronicles of Oklahoma. 102 (2): 147–164.
- Meserve, John Bartlett (Summer 1936). "Chief Coleman Cole" (PDF). Chronicles of Oklahoma. 14 (1): 9–21.
- Nesbitt, Paul (Summer 1933). "J. J. McAlester" (PDF). Chronicles of Oklahoma. 11 (2): 758–764.

Party political offices
Preceded by George W. Bellamy	Democratic nominee for Lieutenant Governor of Oklahoma; 1910	Succeeded by Martin E. Trapp
Political offices
Preceded by George W. Bellamy	Lieutenant Governor of Oklahoma; 1911–1915	Succeeded by Martin E. Trapp
