= Mill Creek, Oklahoma =

- Town
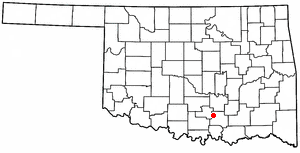
- Location of Mill Creek, Oklahoma
- Coordinates: 34°24′15″N 96°49′35″W
- Country: United States
- State: Oklahoma
- County: Johnston

Area
  - Total: 0.39 sq mi (1.00 km^{2})
  - Land: 0.38 sq mi (0.99 km^{2})
  - Water: 0 sq mi (0.00 km^{2})
- Elevation: 1,034 ft (315 m)

Population (2020)
  - Total: 293
  - Density: 763.5/sq mi (294.79/km^{2})
- Time zone: UTC-6 (Central (CST))
  - Summer (DST): UTC-5 (CDT)
- ZIP code: 74856
- Area code: 580
- FIPS code: 40-48500
- GNIS feature ID: 1095392

Mill Creek is a town in Johnston County, Oklahoma, United States. The population was 293 as of the 2020 Census. Mill Creek Community is an unincorporated area of Johnston County that surrounds the town and claims to have about 1,000 residents, including those who live within the town limits. Local residents consider the town as the focal point of the community.

== History ==
In 1852, when the post office was first established, the town was named Mineral Hill and was within the Choctaw Nation, Indian Territory. The 1855 Treaty of Separation between the Choctaws and Chickasaws established the latter as a separate nation, effective March 4, 1856. Mill Creek then fell within the Chickasaw Nation boundaries. The post office was renamed Harris Mill in 1859, after Chickasaw Governor Cyrus Harris built a large grist mill on the local creek. The name changed back to Mill Creek in 1879. In 1902, the town of Mill Creek incorporated in Indian Territory, and after statehood, became Mill Creek, Oklahoma, on November 16, 1907.

The town's history is closely linked to the railroad. The St. Louis, Oklahoma, and Southern Railway laid tracks through the Mill Creek area from 1900 to 1901. However, the tracks were approximately 3 miles (4.8 km) east of town, so many residents moved closer to the railroad. (Note: The St. Louis, Oklahoma and Southern Railway was bought by the St. Louis and San Francisco Railroad (Frisco), in June 1901, which was then acquired by the Burlington Northern in 1980. The Burlington Northern merged with the Atchison, Topeka and Santa Fe Railroad in 1997, creating what is now known as the BNSF system.) Soon, the town became one of the largest shipping points for cattle in the region.

The population peaked in 1907, at 644.

== Geography ==
According to the United States Census Bureau, the town has a total area of 0.4 square miles (1.0 km^{2}), all land.

== Demographics ==
Historical population
Census	Pop.	Note	%±
1910	626		—
1920	620		−1.0%
1930	422		−31.9%
1940	459		8.8%
1950	299		−34.9%
1960	287		−4.0%
1970	234		−18.5%
1980	431		84.2%
1990	336		−22.0%
2000	340		1.2%
2010	319		−6.2%
2020	293		−8.2%
U.S. Decennial Census

=== 2020 census ===
As of the 2020 census, Mill Creek had a population of 293. The median age was 37.6 years. 28.7% of residents were under the age of 18 and 15.0% of residents were 65 years of age or older. For every 100 females there were 94.0 males, and for every 100 females age 18 and over there were 85.0 males age 18 and over.

0.0% of residents lived in urban areas, while 100.0% lived in rural areas.

There were 112 households in Mill Creek, of which 46.4% had children under the age of 18 living in them. Of all households, 41.1% were married-couple households, 13.4% were households with a male householder and no spouse or partner present, and 36.6% were households with a female householder and no spouse or partner present. About 21.5% of all households were made up of individuals and 13.4% had someone living alone who was 65 years of age or older.

There were 126 housing units, of which 11.1% were vacant. The homeowner vacancy rate was 0.0% and the rental vacancy rate was 14.3%.

Racial composition as of the 2020 census
Race	Number	Percent
White	165	56.3%
Black or African American	1	0.3%
American Indian and Alaska Native	66	22.5%
Asian	1	0.3%
Native Hawaiian and Other Pacific Islander	0	0.0%
Some other race	5	1.7%
Two or more races	55	18.8%
Hispanic or Latino (of any race)	14	4.8%

=== 2000 census ===
As of the 2000 census, the median income for a household in the town was $24,479, and the median income for a family was $26,250. Males had a median income of $29,500 versus $16,250 for females. The per capita income for the town was $10,661. About 23.4% of families and 28.7% of the population were below the poverty line, including 43.0% of those under age 18 and 20.5% of those age 65 or over.

== Economy ==
According to the Encyclopedia of Oklahoma History and Culture, the main economic activity now is extraction of gravel and granite. The granite is noted for its pink color and is marketed under the trade name "Autumn Rose."

== Notable people ==
Cyrus Harris (1817-1888), was a native of Mississippi but moved to Mill Creek in 1855. He became the first governor of the Chickasaw Nation and was re-elected to the position four more times. He made his home near the present town of Mill Creek and was buried in Old Mill Creek Cemetery.

Jess Larson, 1st Administrator of General Services, the administrator of the War Assets Administration, and as chairman and president of the Air Force Association, was born in Mill Creek in 1904.
