= Cyrus Harris =

Chickasaw politician, businessman and farmer

- Born: August 22, 1817; Pontotoc, Mississippi
- Died: January 6, 1888 (aged 70); Mill Creek, Chickasaw Nation, Indian Territory (now Oklahoma)
- Occupations: Businessman, farmer, Chickasaw politician
- Years active: 1837–1878
- Known for: Governor of Chickasaw Nation (elected 5 times)

Cyrus H. Harris (August 22, 1817 – January 6, 1888), a mixed-blood Chickasaw born in Mississippi, was elected the first Governor of the Chickasaw Nation, and served five non-consecutive two-year terms. Although his formal schooling was limited at an elementary level, he became fluent in both the English and Chickasaw languages. He and his family relocated to Indian Territory in 1837, where he was employed in business and also served as an interpreter and developed a keen interest in Chickasaw politics. In 1856, he was elected to his first term as governor of the newly established Chickasaw Nation His accomplishments included organizing a national government after the Chickasaw Nation and Choctaw Nation formally separated into two distinct entities. He also executed a formal alliance between his nation and the Confederate States of America after the outbreak of the American Civil War. After the cessation of hostilities, he played a major role in the recovery of the nation from its devastated condition. He retired from politics in 1874, after serving his fifth term as governor. He died in 1887 at his home in Mill Valley, and was buried at the cemetery in Mill Valley.

== Early life ==
Cyrus Harris was born August 22, 1817, to Elizabeth Oxberry (Note: Some sources spell Elizabeth's surname as Oxbury. It is spelled Oxberry in Harris' biography for the Chickasaw Hall of Fame.) and a man named Harris or Harrison. near Pontotoc, Mississippi, on the estate of his grandmother, Molly Oxberry Gunn. (Note: The identity of the father is uncertain. Meserve and several other sources say the man's original surname was Harrison, but was later shortened to Harris. Only the Chickasaw Hall of Fame biography identifies the father as James Harris. Another source says that Elizabeth's marriage did not last long, that Elizabeth returned to her mother's home before Cyrus was born and that the boy had nothing to do with his father thereafter.) He began his formal education at Monroe Mission School in 1827. Later, he went to an Indian School in Giles County, Tennessee. His formal schooling was only elementary, and he never returned to school after leaving Tennessee. In 1830, Cyrus returned to live with his grandmother, mother and uncle, Martin Colbert.

According to family history, Cyrus' grandmother, Molly Oxberry Gunn, was the daughter of General William Colbert. General William Colbert was a notable Chickasaw warrior and leader. (Note: General William Colbert's Chickasaw name was Chooshemataha.) However, no primary sources have been uncovered to document this relationship. Futhermore, Cyrus writes Harry Warren in the early 1880s with genealogical information about the Colbert family and makes no mention of any relationship to William Colbert.

== Relocation to Indian Territory ==
Early in the 19th Century, the Federal Government began its attempts to force Native Americans out of their homelands in the Southeastern United States to a sparsely settled area that they had reserved for them across the Mississippi River. It was officially known as Indian Territory. In 1818, the Chickasaws became the first of the Five Civilized Tribes to sell their lands in Kentucky and Tennessee to the government. Each received a twenty-year annuity of $1,000 for their share of the tribal land.

By 1830, the Federal Government was putting heavy pressure on the Chickasaws to move from their homes in other Southeastern states to Indian Territory. Their close relatives, the Choctaws, had already signed the 1830 Treaty of Dancing Rabbit Creek to move from Mississippi. (Note: The two tribes shared a common homeland and government, so the removal terms affected both. Both tribes were to share a large area south of the Canadian River, in what is now southern Oklahoma. The Chickasaw tribe then bought a one-fourth interest in the new Choctaw land for $150,000.)

Fluent in both English and Chickasaw, Cyrus Harris became useful as an interpreter in the many meetings with government officials to discuss details of the removal. Cyrus, himself, moved in November 1837, and settled along the Blue River in what is now Johnston County, Oklahoma, where he opened a mercantile business.

== Chickasaw Nation political life ==
Cyrus Harris' diplomatic experience before and during removal sparked his interest in Chickasaw political affairs. He was selected to accompany Edward Pickens in 1850 and 1854 on missions to meet with Federal officials about tribal business. When he returned from the 1850 mission to Washington, he sold his Blue River home, and moved to Boggy Creek, where he lived for about a year. He then moved to Pennington Creek, about 1.0 mile (1.6 km) west of Tishomingo, Oklahoma. In 1855, after returning from his 1854 journey to Washington, Harris moved to Mill Creek, Oklahoma, which remained his home for the rest of his life.

The Chickasaw Nation adopted a new constitution in August, 1856. According to Meserve, there were several candidates in the 1856 election for governor, but none received a majority of the popular vote. Thus, the choice was left to the Legislature, which selected Cyrus Harris by a majority of one vote. Harris spent the majority of his two-year term organizing the new government. He ran for a second term in 1858, but was defeated by Dougherty Colbert.

Cyrus Harris was elected Governor again in 1860. During this term, the American Civil War broke out. The Chickasaws were the first of the Five Civilized Tribes to openly favor the Confederacy. (Note: Meserve stated that one major factor for this development was that the United States Army had already abandoned Fort Washita, leaving the Chickasaw Nation vulnerable to attacks by the Plains Indians, who roamed the western part of Indian Territory.) Governor Harris signed the resolutions supporting secessions from the Union on May 25, 1861.

Harris lost the 1862 election to Dougherty Colbert, and did not run for office in 1864. He ran again in 1866 and was elected Governor for the third time, and was reelected in 1868. Apparently he did not run again in 1870, but made his final campaign in 1872, in which he won his final term as governor. Although he ran again in 1874, he lost to B. F. Overton. He was a candidate in the 1878 election for a sixth term, but lost to Benjamin Burney by five votes. He then retired from politics and spent the remainder of his life at his Mill Creek home. He only emerged from political retirement in 1886 to vigorously support his nephew, William Guy, who was the Progressive Party candidate for governor. Guy's opponent, the "Conservative Party candidate, William L. Byrd, lost this election. However, their political fortunes reversed, and Byrd defeated Guy in the 1890 election.

== Harris family ==
Sources state that Cyrus Harris married three times. His first wife was Kizzie Kemp. His second wife was Nancy Thomas who was born in 1830 in Chickasaw, Mississippi. She married Cyrus Harris in 1848. They had eight children in 14 years. She died as a young mother on January 22, 1864, in Mill Creek, Oklahoma, at the age of 34. His third was Hettie Frazier.

In 1960, flooding along Mill Creek threatened to wash away the old Mill Creek Cemetery. Relatives of Governor Harris decided to have his remains moved to the Drake-Nebo Cemetery. (Note: The Drake-Nebo Cemetery is located near the communities of Drake and Nebo in Murray County, Oklahoma.) His wife and one daughter, Emily, had been buried there during the 1990s. Their other daughter, Lucy Harris Lael, had been reburied in Oaklawn Cemetery in Wynnewood, Oklahoma.
