= Jess Larson =

American lawyer, United States Army general, and government official

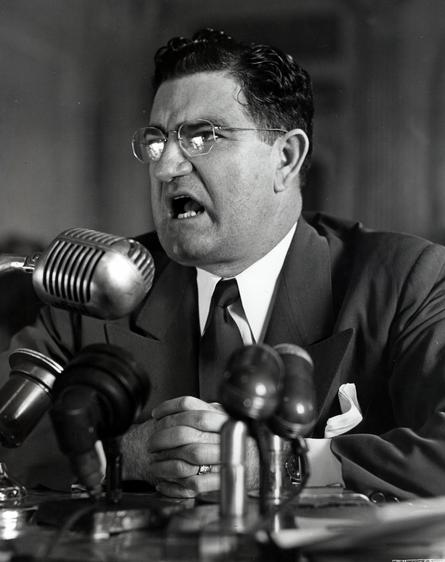

1st Administrator of General Services
- In office July 3, 1949 – January 29, 1953
- President: Harry Truman
- Succeeded by: Russell Forbe (acting)

Personal details
- Born: June 22, 1904 Mill Creek, Oklahoma, US
- Died: February 25, 1987 (aged 82) Washington, D.C., US
- Resting place: Arlington National Cemetery; 38°52′42″N 77°04′07″W
- Party: Democratic Party
- Spouse(s): Germaine Moreau (until 1964); Zdenka Sokitch (2nd wife)
- Education: University of Oklahoma
- Profession: Politician, lawyer

Military service
- Allegiance: United States
- Branch/service: Air Force Reserve
- Years of service: 1920–1966
- Rank: Major General
- Battles/wars: World War II
- Awards: Legion of Merit; Purple Heart

Jess Larson (June 22, 1904 – February 25, 1987) was an American lawyer who served as the first Administrator of General Services, the administrator of the War Assets Administration, and as chairman and president of the Air Force Association.

== Early life ==
Jess Larson was born in Mill Creek, Oklahoma, and he grew up in Chickasha, Oklahoma. As a young man he helped run family ranching and dairy businesses in Chickasha. Larson attended high school at the Missouri Military Academy in Mexico, Missouri. While attending the Missouri Military Academy, he enlisted in the Oklahoma National Guard at age 16. He then went on to attend University of Oklahoma and the University of Oklahoma Law School. In college, Larson was in the ROTC, and he was commissioned as a second lieutenant in the Oklahoma National Guard in 1923.

Two years after completing law school, Larson was elected as mayor of Chickasha. Larson studied law in a Chickasha law office, and in 1934 he moved with his wife to Oklahoma City where he began practicing law. Larson was admitted to the Oklahoma bar in 1935. From 1935 to 1939, he was secretary to the commissioners of the Oklahoma State Land Office.

== Career ==
Larson was a member of the National Guard, and he was called into service as an artillery officer in the Army during World War II. He served in Italy and received the Legion of Merit and the Purple Heart medals. Near the end of the war, he was ordered to Washington.

In 1946, Jess Larson was appointed general counsel of the War Assets Administration, which was charged with disposing of surplus defense property. He became administrator of the War Assets Administration in 1947. In 1949, President Truman nominated him to head the Federal Works Agency. Less than a month later, in July 1949, he was appointed the first administrator of the General Services Administration, which had just been formed. He continued in that position until January 29, 1953.

After leaving GSA, Larson established a private law practice in Washington. He was with the firm of Alvord and Alvord for many years and was of counsel to the firm of Stoel, Rives, Boley, Fraser and Wyse at the time of his death. In 1956 Larson was promoted to brigadier general, Air Force Reserve and in 1961 he was promoted to major general, Air Force Reserve. He retired as a major general in March 1966 after having served five years in grade.

From 1964 to 1971, Larson was president and chairman of the Air Force Association. For this work the Air Force conferred on him its Exceptional Civilian Service Award. Larson was a member of the Oklahoma Aviation Hall of Fame, the Metropolitan Club, the Army & Navy Club and the National Democratic Club.

== Personal life ==
Jess Larson's first wife, Germaine Moreau, died in 1964. He later married Zdenka Sokitch. Larson had one sister and two brothers: Gladys Larson Edwards, retired Army Col. Robert W. Larson of Springfield and K. P. Larson of Las Vegas. Jess Larson died in 1987 at the age of 82 and was buried at Arlington National Cemetery.
