= George W. Bellamy =

American politician

George Bellamy
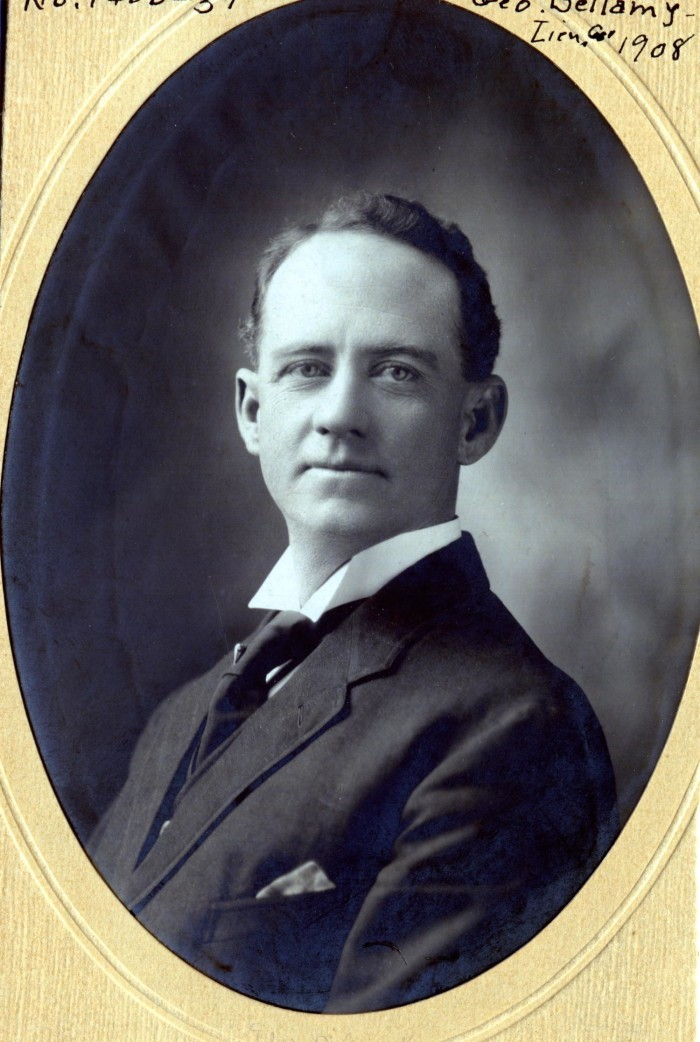
- Bellamy in 1908

1st Lieutenant Governor of Oklahoma
- In office 1907 – January 9, 1911
- Governor: Charles N. Haskell
- Preceded by: Position established
- Succeeded by: J. J. McAlester

Member of the Oklahoma Territorial Council from the 7th district
- In office 1899–1903
- Preceded by: C. W. Gould
- Succeeded by: Felix L. Winkler

Personal details
- Born: December 1867 Missouri
- Died: 1920
- Resting place: El Reno Cemetery
- Party: Democratic
- Spouse: Lou Blanche Jones
- Profession: politician, pharmacist

George W. Bellamy (1867–1920) was the first lieutenant governor of Oklahoma, from 1907 until 1911 alongside Oklahoma's first governor, Charles N. Haskell.

== Early life ==
Bellamy was born in Missouri in December 1867. He married Lou Blanche Jones in Stillwater, Oklahoma on December 5, 1894. They had a daughter named Constance, before Lou's death in 1900. Bellamy worked as a pharmacist.

== Political career ==
A member of the Democratic Party, Bellamy was elected as Lieutenant Governor of Oklahoma in 1907, beating Republican N. G. Turk with 132,568 (54.7%) to 100,106 votes (41.31%), and served until 1911 alongside Governor Charles Haskell. He was the first in a long line of Democratic Lieutenant Governors, lasting until 1995.

== Electoral history ==
1907 Oklahoma lieutenant gubernatorial election
Party	Candidate	Votes	%	±%
Democratic	George W. Bellamy	132,568	54.7	New
Republican	N.G. Turk	100,106	41.3	New
Socialist	M.H. Carey	9,662	3.9	New
Democratic gain from		Swing	N/A	

Party political offices
First	Democratic nominee for Lieutenant Governor of Oklahoma; 1907	Succeeded by J. J. McAlester
Political offices
Preceded by Office established	Lieutenant Governor of Oklahoma; 1907–1911	Succeeded by J. J. McAlester
