= McAlester House =

Historic house in Oklahoma, United States

- U.S. National Register of Historic Places
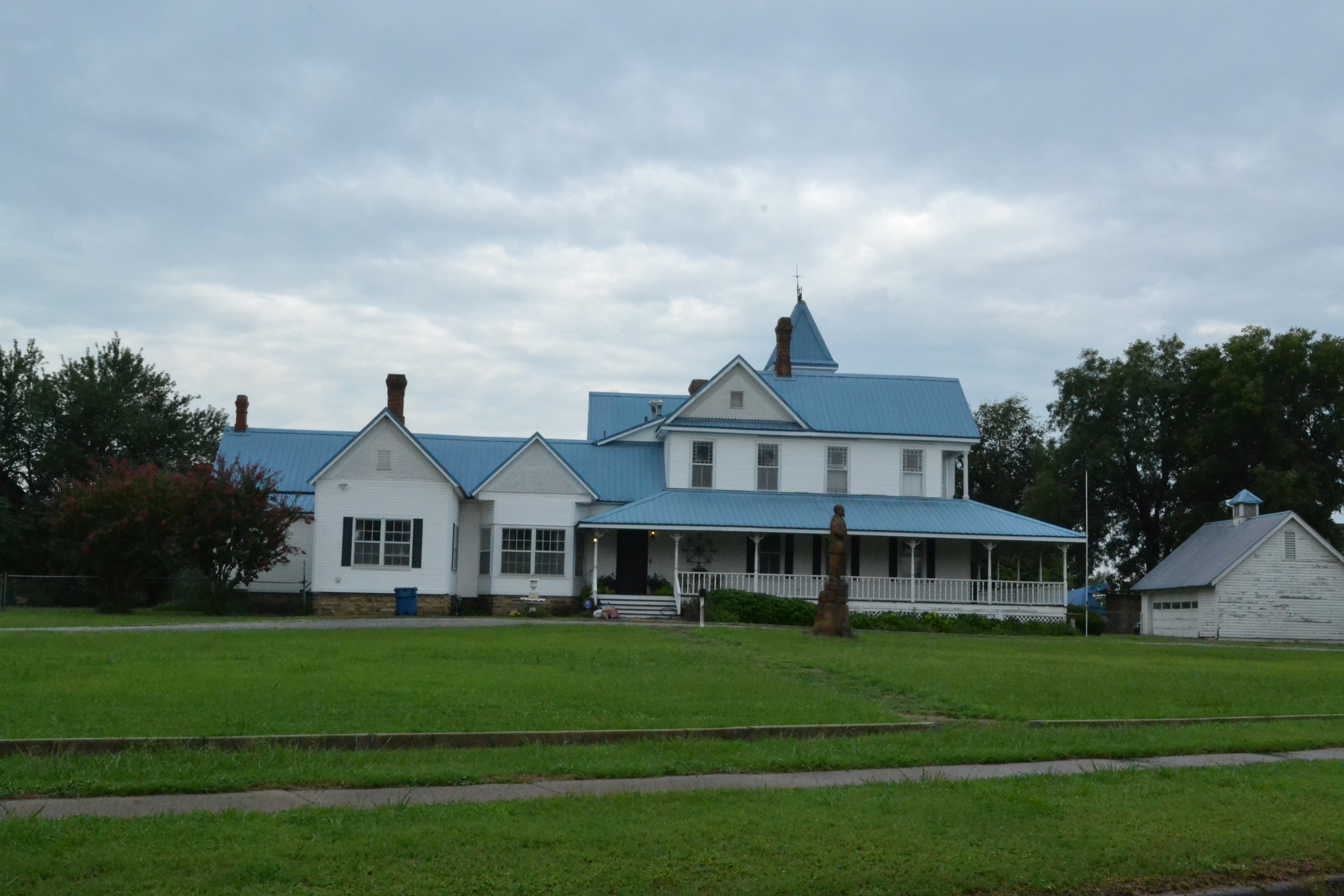

- Location within Oklahoma Location within the United States
- Location: 14 E. Smith Ave., McAlester, Oklahoma
- Coordinates: 34°57′19.9″N 95°45′36.7″W
- Area: less than one acre
- Built: 1870
- Architectural style: Queen Anne
- NRHP reference No.: 80004289
- Added to NRHP: August 29, 1980

The McAlester House is an historic house located at 14 East Smith Avenue in McAlester, Oklahoma.

== Description and history ==
Named for its builder and first owner, the colorful J. J. McAlester, for whom McAlester was named, it began in 1870 as a four-room log house. At the time, it was located in Tobucksy County, Choctaw Nation, in the Indian Territory. J. J. McAlester later surrounded the log structure with a single-story house and also built a much larger two-story Queen Anne style house joined by a breezeway to the smaller structure. Its furnishings, many of which remain to this day, reflected the prosperity and position that the McAlester family enjoyed in the community. The building was renovated in 1960 by J. L. McAlester, grandson of J. J. McAlester. In 1980, McAlester House was added to the National Register of Historic Places.

In the early 2000s, it was bought by its present owners who have continued the work of renovation and preservation. The house was featured in 2008 in a segment of the HGTV channel's If Walls Could Talk program.
