= Benjamin Burney =

Chickasaw politician, governor, and treasurer from 1876 to 1878

Governor of the Chickasaw Nation
- In office 1878–1880
- Preceded by: Benjamin Franklin Overton
- Succeeded by: Benjamin Franklin Overton

Treasurer of the Chickasaw Nation
- In office 1876–1878

Personal details
- Born: Benjamin Crooks Burney; January 15, 1844 Shreveport, Louisiana
- Died: November 25, 1892 (aged 48) Aylsworth, Chickasaw Nation, Indian Territory, U.S.
- Relatives: J. J. McAlester (brother-in-law)

Benjamin Burney was a Chickasaw politician who served as the governor of the Chickasaw Nation from 1878 to 1880 and as treasurer of the Chickasaw Nation from 1876 to 1878.

== Biography ==
Benjamin Crooks Burney was born to David C. Burney and Lucy James in Shreveport, Louisiana, on January 15, 1844. He was born during his family's removal from the Chickasaw lands in northern Mississippi. He was named after the steamboat captain of the ship that transported his family to Indian Territory. The family brought eighteen slaves with them during their removal and settled in Burneyville.

Burney attended the Chickasaw Orphans School in Tishomingo and enlisted in the Indian cavalry loyal to the Confederate States of America, serving in Shocoe's battalion. After the war he returned to Burneyville, became a farmer and rancher. In 1872, his sister Rebecca Burney married J. J. McAlester.

In 1876, he was elected Treasurer of the Chickasaw Nation. In 1878, Burney ran for Governor of the Chickasaw Nation against Cyrus Harris and won by 5-votes. He succeeded Benjamin Franklin Overton and served until 1880. He did not run for reelection and was succeeded by Overton. He died on November 25, 1892, near Aylsworth.
