= Coleman Cole =

Choctaw politician (c.1800–1886)

Chief of the Choctaw Nation
- In office 1874–1878
- Preceded by: William Bryant
- Succeeded by: Isaac Levi Garvin

Personal details
- Born: circa. 1800 Yalobusha County, Mississippi, U.S.
- Died: Fall 1886
- Party: Sheki (Fullblood) Party

Coleman Cole (c. 1800 - 1886) was a Choctaw politician who served as the Chief of the Choctaw Nation between 1874 and 1878.

== Biography ==
Coleman Cole was born in Choctaw territory within Yalobusha County, Mississippi, to Robert Cole and Sallie about the year 1800. Cole remained in Mississippi when the Choctaw people were removed by the United States to Indian Territory to take care of his grandmother Shumaka. He was removed in 1845 and worked as a rancher. He represented Cedar County in the Choctaw Nation Council in 1850, 1855, 1871, 1873. He also served as a county judge. In August 1874, Cole was elected Chief of the Choctaw Nation as a member of the Fullblood or Shaki Party. He was reelected on August 2, 1876, and served until 1878. During his tenure, he heavily taxed white traders in the territory and imposed a $100 license fee for a white man to marry a Choctaw woman. In 1875, he ordered that J. J. McAlester, D. M. Hailey, and Robert Reams be sentenced to death for selling coal mined from Choctaw lands. The men were accused of violating a Choctaw law that prohibited selling "part of the land," and provided for the death penalty for violators. The three men fled and later negotiated their safe return after Cole left office. In 1880, he ran for chief again but lost the election to Jackson McCurtain. He died in the fall of 1886.

== Works cited ==
- Meserve, John Bartlett (Summer 1936). "Chief Coleman Cole" (PDF). Chronicles of Oklahoma. 14 (1): 9–21.
