= Frank Frantz =

American politician (1872–1941)

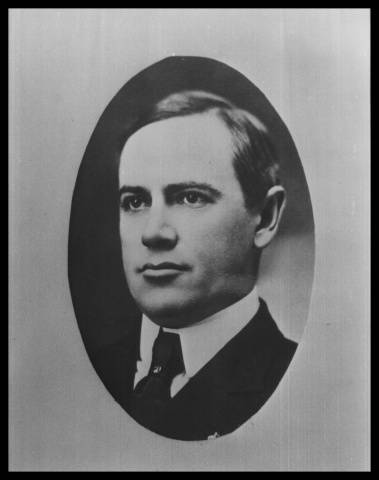

7th Governor of Oklahoma Territory
- In office January 5, 1906 – November 16, 1907
- Appointed by: Theodore Roosevelt
- Preceded by: Thompson Benton Ferguson
- Succeeded by: Charles N. Haskell as state governor (Note: Governor Frantz's office was dissolved following the adoption of the Oklahoma Constitution. Frantz was succeeded by the Governor of Oklahoma Charles N. Haskell)

Personal details
- Born: May 7, 1872 Roanoke, Illinois, U.S.
- Died: March 9, 1941 (aged 68) Tulsa, Oklahoma, U.S.
- Resting place: Memorial Park Cemetery; 36°05′10″N 95°52′54.8″W
- Party: Republican
- Spouse: Matilda Evans Frantz
- Relatives: Orville Frantz (brother)
- Profession: Rough Rider and politician

Military service
- Branch/service: United States Army
- Years of service: May–December, 1898
- Rank: Captain
- Commands: Cuba
- Battles/wars: Spanish–American War

Frank Frantz (May 7, 1872 – March 9, 1941) was an American Rough Rider and politician who served as the seventh and final governor of Oklahoma Territory (1906–07). Frantz ran on the Republican ticket to serve as the first governor of the State of Oklahoma, but lost the election to Democrat Charles N. Haskell.

== Early life ==
On May 7, 1872, Frank Frantz was born in Roanoke, Illinois, the son of Henry J. and Maria Frantz. Frantz would be educated in Illinois's public schools and would spend two years attending Eureka College. Following the opening of the Cherokee Strip on September 16, 1893, Frantz and his brothers moved to Medford in Oklahoma Territory.

Frantz would later work in California and Arizona Territory for an oil company. In 1898, while in Prescott, the capital of Arizona Territory, the Spanish–American War broke out. On May 1, 1898, at the age of 26, Frantz enlisted in the 1st United States Volunteer Cavalry, which the American press called the Rough Riders. Upon joining the Rough Riders, Frantz returned to Indian Territory and met the regiment's charismatic second-in-command, Lieutenant Colonel Theodore Roosevelt.

== Rough Riders ==
After joining the Rough Riders, Frantz was assigned to A Company and given the rank of First Lieutenant, where he served as the Deputy Commander under Captain William "Bucky" O'Neill. Traveling to Daiquirí, Cuba, the Rough Riders would engage, on June 24, 1898, in the Battle of Las Guasimas, the first clash between American and Spanish forces. Frantz fought valiantly and his performance caught Roosevelt's eye.

On June 30, Colonel Leonard Wood, the commander of the Rough Riders, was promoted to the rank of brigadier general. Likewise, Lt. Colonel Roosevelt was promoted to colonel and given command of the Rough Riders. On the following day, the fiercest battle of the Spanish–American War occurred: the Battle of San Juan Hill. Frantz's skill during the battle would forever gain him Roosevelt's friendship and trust. Just before the final assault on the Spanish fortifications, Captain O'Neill was warned about unnecessarily exposing himself to Spanish fire. Even as he was dismissing the danger, O'Neill was instantly killed by a bullet hitting him in the mouth. Frantz immediately took over the command and led the company to a successful charge up Kettle and San Juan Hills. After the battle concluded, in recognition of Frantz's service, Roosevelt promoted Frantz to the rank of captain and commander of A Company of the Rough Riders.

On August 12, 1898, an armistice between the United States and Spain ended the Spanish–American War. In the coming months, on December 10, 1898, with the Treaty of Paris, Spain ceded the Philippines, Guam, and Puerto Rico to the United States and Cuba gained its independence. Although Captain Frantz would leave military service behind him, he gained an abiding friendship with Roosevelt.

== Return to Oklahoma ==
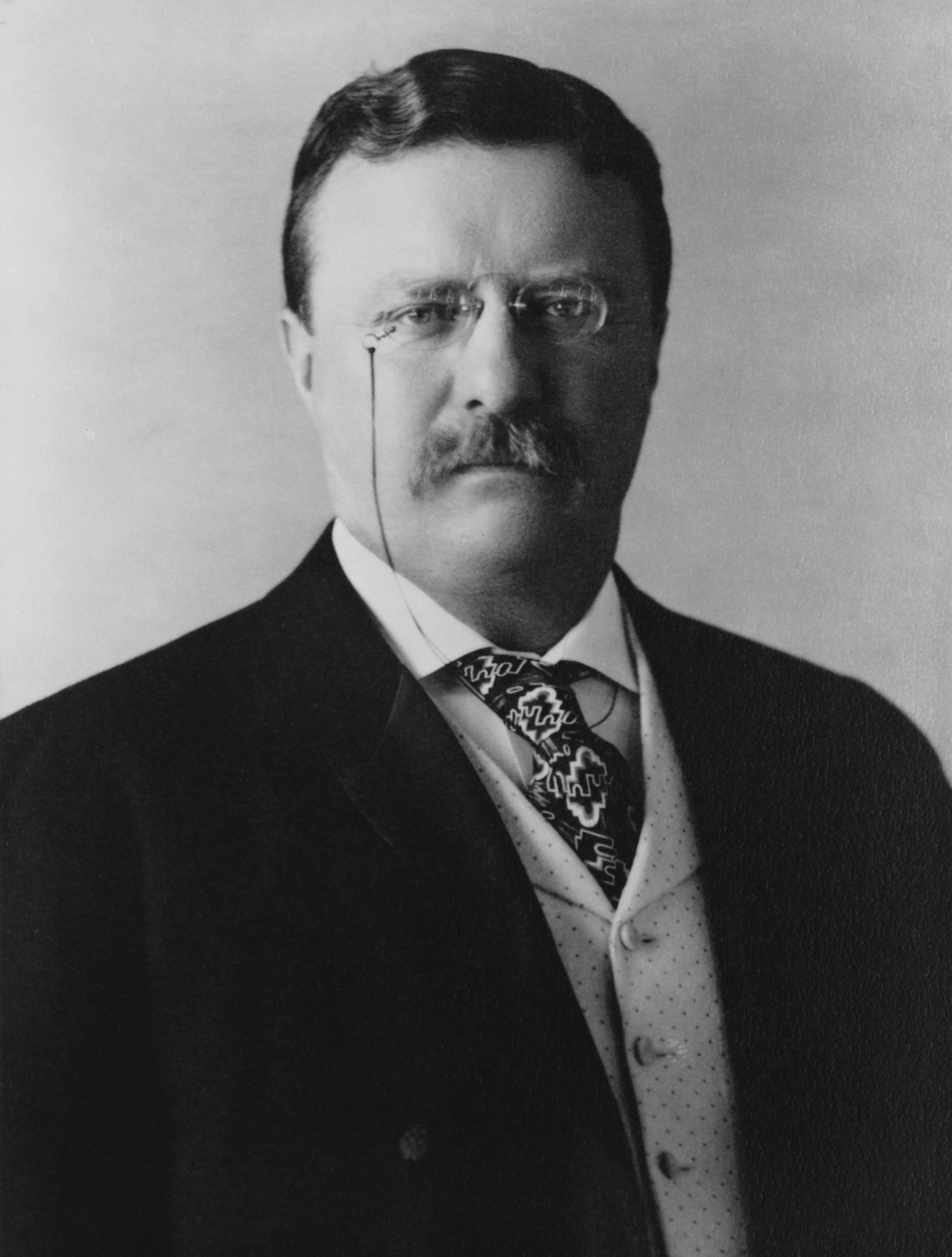
President Theodore Roosevelt appointed his friend to the Governorship of Oklahoma Territory.

Upon the conclusion of his military service, Captain Frantz returned to Oklahoma Territory and settled in Enid. There with his brother, Montgomery, he opened a hardware and lumber business, Frantz Brothers Hardware and Tin Shop. While in Enid, Frantz met Matilda Evans of Oklahoma City, and married her in March 1901. Their union would produce five children.

On June 20, 1900, Frantz was initiated an Entered Apprentice in Enid Lodge No. 80. By December of that same year, he would be passed to the degree of Fellowcraft. However, for reasons that are unknown, it would take a full five years since the month he was initiated to earn the degree of Master Mason (a full-fledged member of Freemasonry) on June 12, 1905. He was also a Knight Templar of the York Rite of Freemasonry, as his Templar sword is currently displayed in the Senate Lounge inside the Oklahoma Capitol building.

== Public service ==
During this time, Roosevelt was elected vice president on the Republican ticket to serve under US President William McKinley. On September 6, 1901, President McKinley was shot at the Pan-American Exposition. McKinley died on September 14, and Roosevelt succeeded him to the presidency.

Frantz's wartime association with now President Roosevelt became a lifelong friendship. Frantz would, on several occasions, travel to the White House to spend time with the Commander-in-Chief. On his visits to the White House, Frantz, an athlete and a boxer, engaged in several matches with Roosevelt, knocking him out on three occasions.

Immediately, Frantz's friendship with the new president proved beneficial. Frantz, a fellow Republican, was named the postmaster of Enid by President Roosevelt before the end of 1901. Frantz would serve in this post for another two years, when Roosevelt appointed him Indian Agent of the Osage Agency at Pawhuska. Roosevelt again demonstrated his friendship with Frantz by elevating him to the governorship of Oklahoma Territory. Frantz assumed the office on January 5 and would be inaugurated on January 16, 1906, being the seventh and (at age 34) youngest governor to serve in the Territory's history.

== Governor of Oklahoma Territory ==
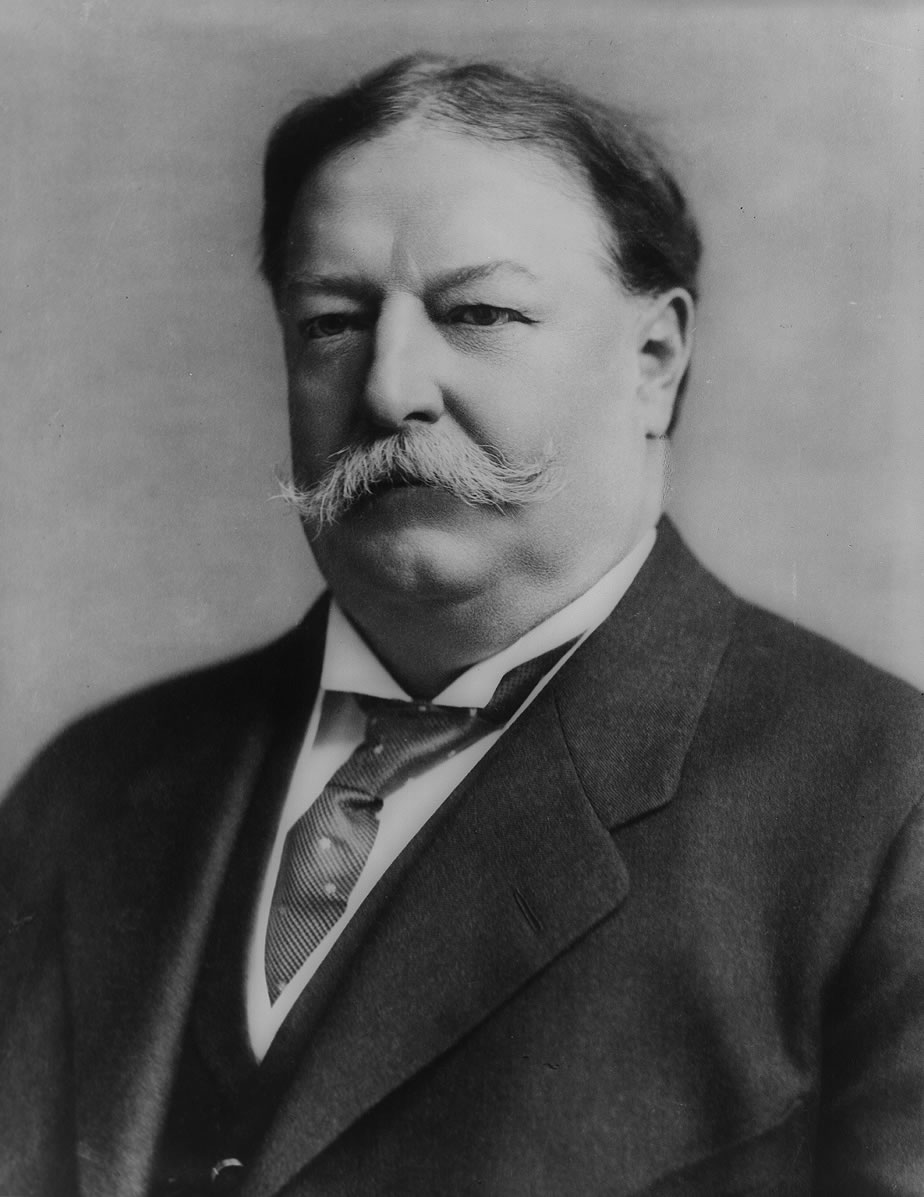
William Howard Taft would support Frantz in his bid for Governorship. However, Taft's disapproval of the Oklahoma Constitution cost Frantz the Governorship of Oklahoma.

Governor Frantz assumed control of the Territory during a time when the citizens of the Territory were seeking statehood. Thus his Governorship immediately became routine. However, Frantz would do many beneficial things for the would-be state.

Governor Frantz made an invaluable contribution to the future of Oklahoma's educational system. Immediately upon coming into office, Governor Frantz discovered that oil companies were drilling on land reserved for public buildings after statehood in Pawnee County without obtaining permission. In response, Frantz crafted a policy requiring those companies to lease the mineral rights to the state.

After the United States Congress passage of the Enabling act of 1906, Frantz set his administration into overdrive. Frantz immediately took steps to obtain the remaining amount of land in No Man's Land, what would become the Panhandle of modern Oklahoma. The Governor's agents acquired the entire federal domain within the realm of the state. Frantz leased the land to Oklahoma's farmers, earning the new state millions in revenue.

After the proposed Oklahoma Constitution was completed in early 1907, Frantz sought, and won, the Republican nomination to serve as Oklahoma's first governor. To face Frantz, the Democrats selected Charles N. Haskell, one of the proposed Constitution's main authors. Frantz would accept Haskell's challenge to joint public discussions throughout the state, and every problem concerned with the administration of the new state came up and was debated during the campaign.

Frantz would lose to Charles N. Haskell in an election to become the first Governor of Oklahoma.

During the course of the campaign, two nationally prominent figures spoke at various locations: Republican presidential nominee William Howard Taft and Democratic presidential nominee William Jennings Bryan. Though Taft supported Frantz, Taft's disapproval of Oklahoma's proposed constitution and his advice that the people vote against it caused the voters to react in favor of the Democrats. Frantz lost the race to Haskell on September 17, 1907. On the same day, the voters approved the Oklahoma Constitution into law. Soon after, Congress accepted the Constitution and Oklahoma became the 46th State on November 16. Haskell was also inaugurated on that day, resulting in the end of Frantz's term.

== Later life and death ==
After leaving office, Frantz moved to Denver, Colorado where he resided for six years. In 1915, Frantz returned to Oklahoma to live in Tulsa, becoming the head of the Land Department of the Cosden Oil Company. Frantz then spent time working in the oil royalty business. In 1940 he was elected a director of the Investors Royalty Company. Frantz made an unsuccessful attempt to reenter politics, running to serve as the Congressman representing Oklahoma's first congressional district in 1932. At the age of 68, overcome with health issues, Frantz lost consciousness on March 8, 1941, in Muskogee, Oklahoma. Frantz was transported to back to Tulsa where, on March 9, 1941, he died in his own home.

== Electoral history ==
1907 Oklahoma gubernatorial election
Party	Candidate	Votes	%	±%
Democratic	Charles N. Haskell	134,162	53.5	New
Republican	Frank Frantz	106,507	42.5	New
Socialist	C.C. Ross	9,740	3.8	New
Democratic gain from		Swing	N/A	

Political offices
Preceded by Thompson Benton Ferguson	Governor of Oklahoma Territory; Under President Theodore Roosevelt; 1906–1907	Succeeded by Charles N. Haskell state Governor
Party political offices
Preceded by First	Republican nominee for Governor of Oklahoma; 1907	Succeeded by J. W. McNeal
