= Charles N. Haskell =

American politician and 1st Governor of Oklahoma (1860–1933)

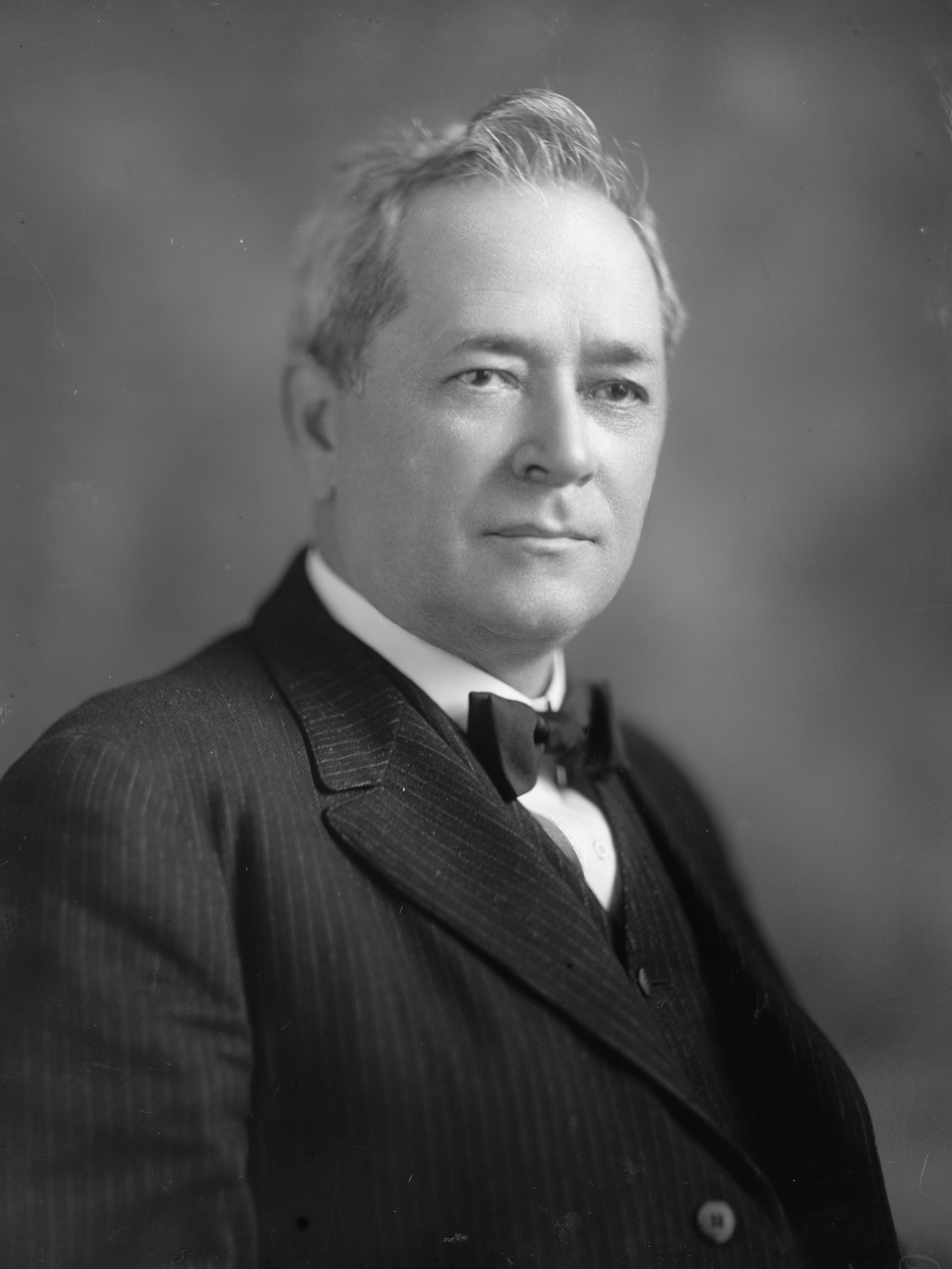
- Haskell, 1905–1933

1st Governor of Oklahoma
- In office November 16, 1907 – January 9, 1911
- Lieutenant: George W. Bellamy
- Preceded by: Frank Frantz; as Territorial Governor
- Succeeded by: Lee Cruce

Treasurer of the Democratic National Committee
- In office July 25, 1908 – September 27, 1908
- Preceded by: William H. O'Brien
- Succeeded by: Herman Ridder

Personal details
- Born: Charles Nathaniel Haskell; March 13, 1860 Leipsic, Ohio, US
- Died: July 5, 1933 (aged 73) Oklahoma City, Oklahoma, US
- Resting place: Muskogee, Oklahoma, US
- Party: Democratic
- Spouse(s): Lucie Pomeroy Haskell; Lillian Gallup Haskell
- Profession: Teacher, lawyer

Charles Nathaniel Haskell (March 13, 1860 – July 5, 1933) was an American lawyer, oilman, and politician who was the first governor of Oklahoma. As a delegate to Oklahoma's constitutional convention in 1906, he played a crucial role in drafting the Oklahoma Constitution and gaining Oklahoma's admission into the United States as the 46th state in 1907. A prominent businessman in Muskogee, he helped the city grow in importance. He represented the city as a delegate in both the 1906 Oklahoma convention and an earlier convention in 1905 that was a failed attempt to create a U.S. state of Sequoyah.

During Oklahoma's constitutional convention, Haskell succeeded in pushing for the inclusion of prohibition and blocking the inclusion of women's suffrage in the Oklahoma Constitution. As governor, he was responsible for moving the state capital to Oklahoma City, establishing schools and state agencies, reforming the territorial prison system, and enforcing prohibition. The constitution prohibited persons from having successive terms in the governor's office. Lee Cruce succeeded Haskell, who returned to his law practice and related business activities. Haskell died of a stroke in 1933.

== Early life and education ==
Born in West Leipsic, Ohio on March 13, 1860, Charles Haskell was the son of George R. Haskell who died when the boy was three years old. His widowed mother, Jane H. Haskell (née Reeves), worked for the local Methodist church as a bell ringer and custodian to support her six children.

At the age of 10, Haskell started working as a farm boy for a farmer named Miller in Putnam County, Ohio. He lived and worked there for eight years as he grew into adulthood. Miller was a school teacher, but the young Haskell did not have time to attend school because of his work. Instead, Miller's wife taught him at home, and Haskell earned a teaching certificate at age 17.

== Private career ==
Haskell became a schoolteacher at age 18 and taught for three years in Putnam County. After "reading the law" as an apprentice with an established firm, on December 6, 1880, he passed the bar exam. He became a practicing attorney at age 20, setting up his practice in the village of Ottawa, Ohio. In his work as an attorney in Ottawa, he became one of the most successful lawyers in the county seat. He also became prominent in the Democratic Party in northwestern Ohio. In 1888, Haskell started work as a general contractor; for the next 16 years, his business career gave him an understanding of American industrialism. During this time, he lived part of the time in New York City and in San Antonio, Texas.

== Marriage and family ==
Haskell married Lucie Pomeroy, daughter of a prominent Ottawa family, on October 11, 1881. Their children were Norman, who became a lawyer in Muskogee, Oklahoma (where the family moved in 1901); Murray, who worked as a bank cashier; and daughter Lucie.

Lucie Pomeroy Haskell died in March 1888. Her widower remarried in 1889, to Lillie Elizabeth Gallup. They also had three children together: Frances, Jane and Joseph.

== Move to Muskogee ==
Haskell moved to Muskogee, Oklahoma, where he would become a prominent resident.

Following the Land Run of 1889 and passage of the Organic Act in 1890, migration of European Americans to Oklahoma Territory increased dramatically, raising the territory's status on the national scene. Haskell moved his family to Muskogee, the capital of the Creek Nation, in March 1901. When he arrived, Haskell found Muskogee a "dry", sleepy village of some 4,500 people. He built the first five-story business block in the town and in Indian Territory.

Haskell organized and built most of the railroads running into Muskogee. He is said to have built and owned 14 brick buildings in the city. Through his influence, Muskogee developed as a center of business and industry, and its population grew to more than 20,000 inhabitants. He often recounted that he hoped Muskogee would become the "Queen City of the Southwest".

Haskell gained increasing influence in the politics of Indian Territory and drew the attention of the leaders of the Creek Nation. During this time, the Native American nations in Indian Territory were talking of creating a state and joining the Union under the name of the State of Sequoyah. The Creek selected Haskell as their official representative to the conventions, in the position of vice-president for the Five Civilized Tribes, held in Eufaula, Oklahoma in 1902 and Muskogee in 1905.

Of the six delegates at the Muskogee convention, only Haskell and William H. Murray were not of Native American descent. U.S. President Theodore Roosevelt blocked the attempt to create Sequoyah, as he opposed the potential of another Democratic-majority state.

Haskell wrote a large portion of the proposed state's constitution. Although he had publicly worked for a separate state for Indian Territory, privately, he was thrilled to see the Sequoyah proposal defeated. Haskell believed it would force the Indian leaders to join in statehood with Oklahoma Territory.

The United States Congress and President Roosevelt agreed that the Oklahoma and Indian territories had to combine to enter the Union as one state, the State of Oklahoma. After congressional passage of the Enabling Act in 1906, Haskell was elected as a delegate by the largest margin in the new state, representing the seventy-sixth district, which included Muskogee. Traveling to Guthrie and the Oklahoma Constitutional convention on November 20, 1906, Haskell would meet William H. Murray from the Muskogee convention and Robert L. Williams. Due to their presence at both conventions, Haskell and Murray became lifelong friends.

The delegates to the Guthrie convention included many who had served in the Sequoyah convention. Numerous elements proposed for the new constitution were based upon the Sequoyah constitution. Haskell owned the New State Tribune, and through its editorial columns advocated for the elements he wanted in the new constitution. Most were incorporated, in substance if not in form. While Murray served as the convention's president, delegates recognized Haskell's power in the body. A local newspaper during the time, the Guthrie Report, called Haskell "the power behind the throne".

Haskell had a perfect attendance and voting record during the session. He advocated for provisions that affected both territories’ labor problems, and advocated for representatives of organized labor. Haskell also drafted a report drawing up county boundaries, led the crusade for state prohibition, introduced Jim Crow laws, as were prevalent among Southern states to restrict African Americans to second-class status; and successfully kept female suffrage out of the state constitution.

== Gubernatorial campaign ==
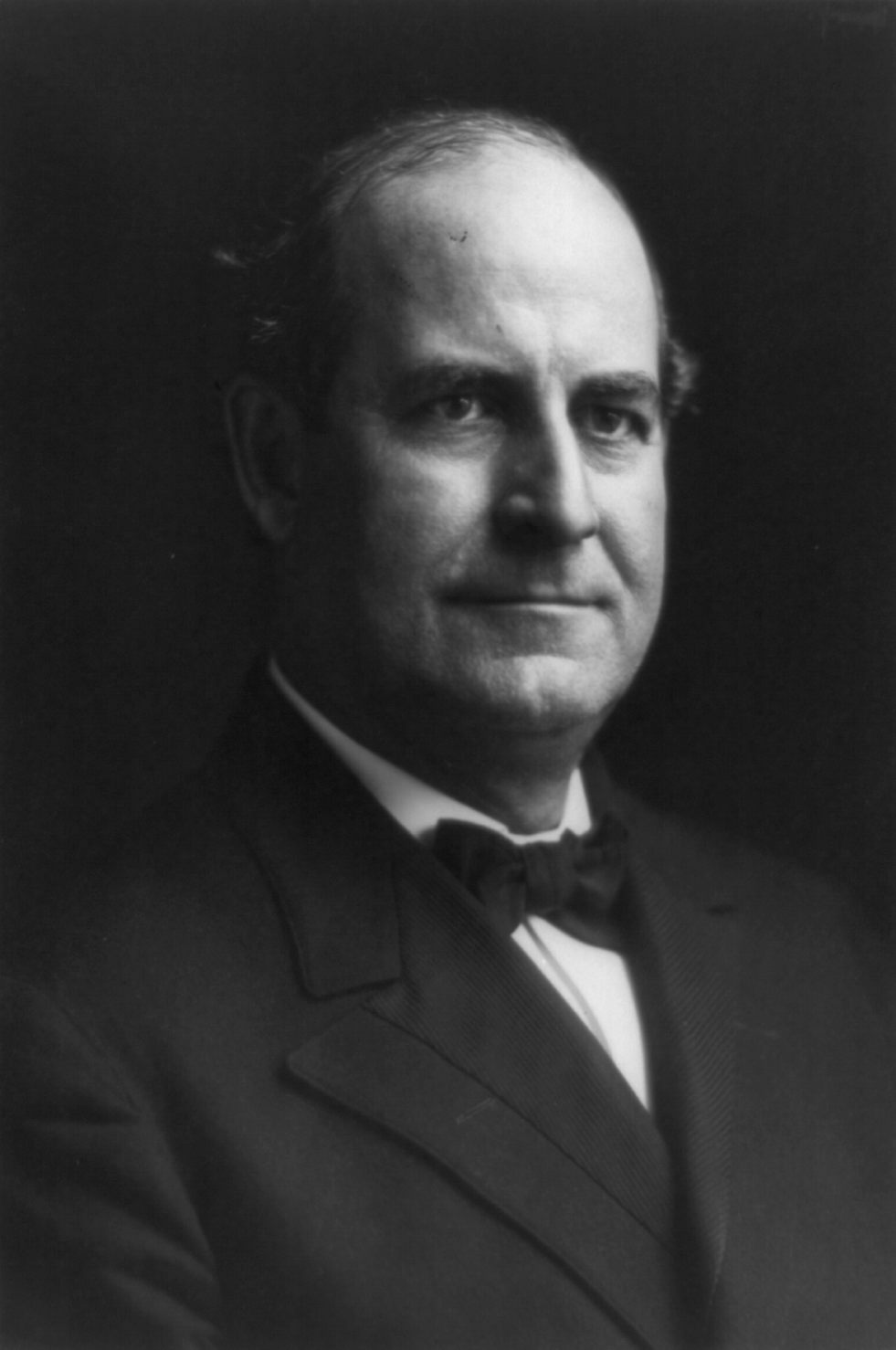
William Jennings Bryan supported Haskell in his 1907 campaign.

At Tulsa on March 26, 1907, during the recess before the final adoption of the constitution by the convention, Haskell held a large Democratic Party banquet at the Brady Hotel, attended by between 500 and 600 of the leading Democrats of the new state. During this banquet, the first campaigns for governor were formally inaugurated. During this evening, his friends proposed Haskell for the Democratic gubernatorial candidacy. Among the other potential candidates were Thomas Doyle of Perry and Lee Cruce of Ardmore. Haskell, like other prominent Democrats at the time, had the strong support of labor and agriculture leaders.

The party primaries for governor were set for June 8, and Doyle and Cruce had already been campaigning; Haskell had little time. During his campaign, Haskell made 88 speeches in 45 days, and reached nearly every county. The lieutenants of the respective candidates were vigorously working in the school districts and securing support in every community. Haskell's hard-working nature led him to win the Democratic nomination. Haskell won the Democratic primary by a more than 4,000-vote majority. Frank Frantz, the Republican territorial governor, was nominated as the Republican candidate at their caucus at Tulsa.

Frantz was a former Rough Rider and a friend of U.S. President Theodore Roosevelt, who had appointed him. He was a very strong candidate for the Republican party. Haskell challenged Frantz to joint public discussions throughout the state; they discussed every problem facing administration of the new state during the campaign.

In addition, two nationally prominent figures spoke at various locations: Republican presidential nominee William Howard Taft and Democratic presidential nominee William Jennings Bryan. Taft's disapproval of Oklahoma's proposed constitution and his recommendation that the people vote against it seemed to increase support for the Democrats. Haskell won the gubernatorial race by more than 30,000 votes on September 17, 1907. On the same day, the voters ratified the new Oklahoma Constitution.

== Governor of Oklahoma ==
Governor Haskell as he appeared upon entering office

On November 16, 1907, five minutes after it was known that Oklahoma had officially become a state, Guthrie Leader editor Leslie G. Niblack administered the oath of office to Haskell. The ceremony took place privately in Haskell's hotel apartments in the presence of his immediate family, Robert Latham Owen, United States Senator-elect, and Thomas Owen of Muskogee, Haskell's former political manager. Haskell's inaugural address at Guthrie, delivered on the south steps of the Carnegie Library, quickly lifted him into national prominence.

Haskell's old friends William H. Murray and Robert L. Williams also came into power with the state's founding; with Murray as the state's first Speaker of the Oklahoma House of Representatives and Williams appointed, by Haskell, as the first Oklahoma Supreme Court chief justice. Haskell set the precedents for the use of executive power.

During the 1st Oklahoma Legislature, Haskell delivered a message creating a commission charged with sending a message to the U.S. Congress: amending the United States Constitution to provide for the election of U.S. senators by a direct vote of the people. Although it did not occur until after he left office, his efforts, as well as the works of the Progressive-era leaders, provided for the passage of the Seventeenth Amendment to the United States Constitution in 1912.

Though Guthrie was the official capital of the state, Haskell set up his administration from Oklahoma City. Oklahoma City quickly grew in industry and prominence, with a booming population of 64,000, shadowing the smaller city of Guthrie, which was located just miles from the growing city. Haskell personally led the move to change the capital from Guthrie to Oklahoma City. First, he moved the official home of the Great Seal of Oklahoma and Oklahoma Constitution. Slowly, all government functions moved to the Oklahoma City area.

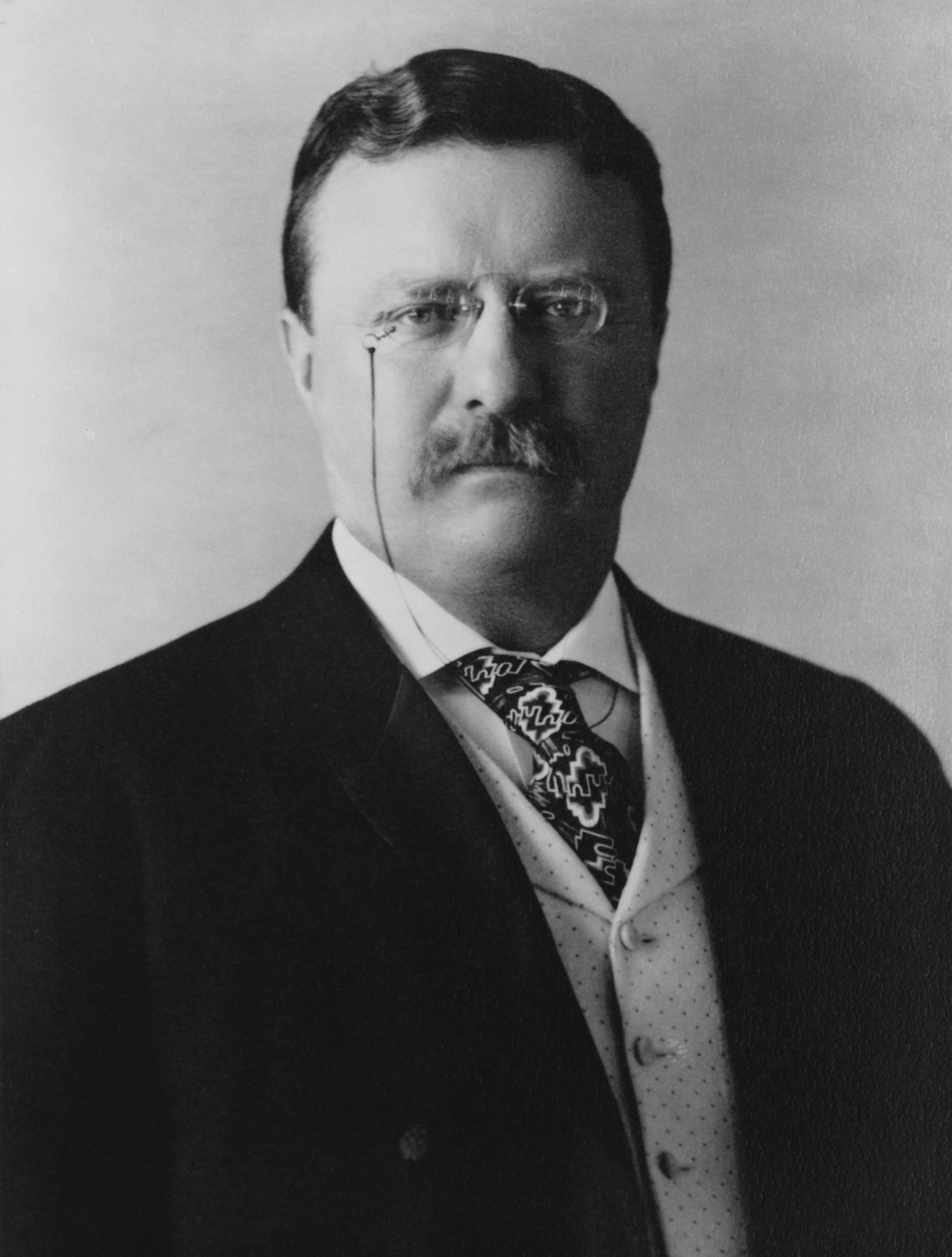
Theodore Roosevelt would be one of Haskell's fiercest political opponents during his Governorship.

In the state legislature's first session, under Haskell's leadership, Oklahoma carried out various reforms including laws regulating banking in the state, while the old territorial prison system was reformed and the public protected from exploitative railroads, public utilities, trusts and monopolies. Haskell also initiated a law insuring deposits in case of a bank failure, a landmark piece of legislation in the nation. Haskell also rigidly enforced prohibition through the Alcohol Control Act. Though following progressive dogma at every turn, such as the introduction of child labor laws, factory inspection codes, safety codes for mines, health and sanitary laws, and employer's liability for workers, Haskell's legislative schedule also included Jim Crow laws for Oklahoma. Haskell's other significant contributions while governor included establishing the Oklahoma Geological Survey, the Oklahoma School for the Blind, the Oklahoma College for Women and the Oklahoma State Department of Health. In addition, he helped to create the Oklahoma Court of Criminal Appeals in 1908. Haskell selected the first judges of the Oklahoma Court of Criminal Appeals.

Prior to statehood, Kansas officials imprisoned individuals convicted of crimes in Oklahoma Territory. Oklahoma Commissioner of Charities and Corrections Kate Barnard, Oklahoma's first female state official, visited the Kansas prisons and reported to Governor Haskell on the horrible conditions. In response, in 1908, Haskell pushed a bill through the state legislature that transferred 50 Oklahoma prisoners detained in the Kansas penitentiary at Lansing to McAlester, Oklahoma. When the Oklahoma state militia marched the prisoners down to McAlester, they found no prison. Under military supervision, the prisoners built Oklahoma State Penitentiary, the state's first correctional facility (still in use today). The militia housed the prisoners in a tent city and were authorized by Haskell to use lethal force against any prisoner that tried to escape.

A grandfather clause was also enacted by the 2nd Oklahoma Legislature by the state's Democratic leaders, effectively excluding blacks from voting. Haskell would spend the remainder of his term enforcing prohibition, regulation of railroads and other trusts, and the moving of the state capital to Oklahoma City. Haskell's dream came true on June 11, 1910, when Oklahoma City became the state's official capital.

In 1909, Haskell was indicted in federal court as part of the Town Lot Fraud scandal, which involved the mass filing of fraudulent real estate documents to steal Muscogee Nation surplus land. The indictment was dismissed on September 29, 1910. Critics of Haskell, particularly in the Tulsa World used the term "Haskellism" to refer to allegations of political corruption during his tenure.

At the end of his term as governor in 1911, Haskell stepped down from the governorship, happy to see his 1907 Democratic primary challenger Lee Cruce inaugurated as the second governor of Oklahoma. In 1912, Haskell unsuccessfully challenged incumbent U.S. Senator Robert Latham Owen in a hard-fought Democratic primary for his U.S. Senate seat.

== National politics ==
Not only a powerful figure in Oklahoma politics, Haskell's progressive roots and populist nature granted him national clout. In 1908, Haskell headed the Oklahoma delegation to the National Democratic Convention at Denver where he was appointed treasurer of the Democratic National Committee. He was the spokesman for William Jennings Bryan in writing the platform of the convention. Two months later, he was forced to resign his treasurer position after allegations were leveled against him of taking illegal contributions from the Standard Oil Company. In 1920, he again headed the Oklahoma delegation at the National Convention, which in that year met at San Francisco, and was committed to and faithfully labored for United States Senator Robert Latham Owen, of Oklahoma, for the United States presidential nomination. Haskell would serve in this post two more times: a third in 1928 to the National Democratic Convention at Houston, and a fourth time in 1932 to the National Democratic Convention at Chicago.

At each convention and in his speeches and in articles appearing in the public press he disclosed an intimate understanding of the big money masters of America and ruthlessly exposed many of their venal practices and their corrupt usage of the public funds in their own interest to the detriment of the people.

== Later life, death and legacy ==
Haskell entered the oil business after finishing his term as governor, a profession he would stay in until the end of his life. In 1933, Haskell suffered a major stroke, from which he would never recover. Three months later, Haskell would die from pneumonia. Haskell lost consciousness on July 4th that same year, and died the next day, in the Skirvin Hotel in Oklahoma City at the age of 73. He is buried in Muskogee, Oklahoma.

Charles Haskell Elementary in Edmond, Oklahoma, and Charles N. Haskell Middle School in Broken Arrow, Oklahoma are named in his honor. Haskell County, Oklahoma and the city of Haskell, Oklahoma are also named after him.

== Electoral history ==
1907 Oklahoma gubernatorial election
Party	Candidate	Votes	%	±%
Democratic	Charles N. Haskell	134,162	53.5	New
Republican	Frank Frantz	106,507	42.5	New
Socialist	C.C. Ross	9,740	3.8	New
Democratic gain from		Swing	N/A	

Oklahoma Democratic primary (August 6, 1912)
Party	Candidate	Votes	%
Democratic	Robert L. Owen (Incumbent)	80,204	64.3%
Democratic	Charles N. Haskell	44,483	35.6%
Turnout		124,687	

== State of the State Speeches ==
- First State of the State
- Second State of the State
- Third State of the State
- Fourth and final State of the State

== Sources ==
- Short biography of Charles N Haskell
- Address of Haskell from the Chronicles of Oklahoma
- Tribute to Haskell from the Chronicles of Oklahoma

Party political offices
First	Democratic nominee for Governor of Oklahoma; 1907	Succeeded by Lee Cruce
Political offices
Preceded by Frank Frantz; Territorial Governor	Governor of Oklahoma; 1907–1911	Succeeded by Lee Cruce
Notes and references
1. The position of Governor of Oklahoma was created under the new Oklahoma Constitution. It replaced the office of Governor of Oklahoma Territory.
