= 1910 Oklahoma elections =

- November 8, 1910

The 1910 Oklahoma elections were held on November 8, 1910, in the U.S. State of Oklahoma. Oklahoma voters elected statewide officials and members of the United States House of Representatives, and also determined the permanent state capital city of Oklahoma City by referendum.

== Federal ==
=== House ===
District	Incumbent			This race	
District	Member	Party	First elected	Results	Candidates
Oklahoma 1	Bird S. McGuire	Republican	1907	Incumbent re-elected.	▌ ✓ Bird Segle McGuire (Republican) 49.2%; ▌Neil E. McNeil (Democratic) 44.7%; ▌W. L. Reynolds (Socialist) 6.1%
Oklahoma 2	Dick T. Morgan	Republican	1908	Incumbent re-elected.	▌ ✓ Dick T. Morgan (Republican) 46.0%; ▌Elmer L. Fulton (Democratic) 44.1%; ▌H. I. Bryant (Socialist) 9.9%
Oklahoma 3	Charles E. Creager	Republican	1908	Incumbent lost re-election. New member elected. Democratic gain.	▌ ✓ James S. Davenport (Democratic) 50.6%; ▌Charles E. Creager (Republican) 43.5%; ▌G. M. Snyder (Socialist) 5.9%
Oklahoma 4	Charles D. Carter	Democratic	1907	Incumbent re-elected.	▌ ✓ Charles D. Carter (Democratic) 55.6%; ▌Charles M. Campbell (Republican) 30.4%; ▌J. N. Gilmore (Socialist) 14.0%
Oklahoma 5	Scott Ferris	Democratic	1907	Incumbent re-elected.	▌ ✓ Scott Ferris (Democratic) 58.9%; ▌J. H. Franklin (Republican) 27.6%; ▌H. H. Stallard (Socialist) 13.5%

== State ==
=== Governor ===
1910 Oklahoma gubernatorial election
Party	Candidate	Votes	%	±%
Democratic	Lee Cruce	120,218	48.5%	−5.0%
Republican	J. W. McNeal	99,527	40.1%	−2.4%
Socialist	J. T. Cumbie	24,707	9.9%	+6.1%
Prohibition	George E. Rouch	3,214	1.2%	New
Democratic hold		Swing	-5.0%	

=== Lieutenant Governor ===
Democratic Primary

Oklahoma lieutenant gubernatorial Democratic primary (August 2, 1910)
Party	Candidate	Votes	%
Democratic	J.J. McAlester	33,064	30.2%
Democratic	Frank P. Davis	24,104	22.0%
Democratic	J. M. Postelle	14,747	13.4%
Democratic	P. P. Duffy.	13,388	12.2%
Democratic	P. J. Yeager	10,524	9.6%
Democratic	Albert H. Ellis	9,699	8.8%
Democratic	Robert L. Notson	3,870	3.5%
Turnout		109,396	

Republican primary

Oklahoma lieutenant gubernatorial Republican primary (August 2, 1910)
Party	Candidate	Votes	%
Republican	Gilbert Dukes	60,938	100%

Socialist primary

Oklahoma lieutenant gubernatorial Socialist primary (August 2, 1910)
Party	Candidate	Votes	%
Socialist	John G. Wills	13,184	100%

Prohibition primary

Oklahoma lieutenant gubernatorial Prohibition primary (August 2, 1910)
Party	Candidate	Votes	%
Prohibition	I.A. Briggs	68	100%

General election

1910 Oklahoma lieutenant gubernatorial election
Party	Candidate	Votes	%	±%
Democratic	J.J. McAlester	118,544	49.3%	−5.4%
Republican	Gilbert Dukes	94,621	39.3%	−2.0%
Socialist	John G. Wills	23,974	9.9%	+6.0%
Prohibition	I.A. Briggs	3,136	1.3%	New
Democratic hold		Swing		

Results by county McAlester: 40–50%; 50–60%; 60–70%; 70–80%; Dukes: 40–50%; 50–60%; 60–70%

=== Secretary of State ===
Democratic Primary

Oklahoma Secretary of State Democratic primary (August 2, 1910)
Party	Candidate	Votes	%
Democratic	Ben F. Harrison	56,005	55.0%
Democratic	Leo Meyer	45,874	45.0%
Turnout		101,879	

Republican primary

Oklahoma Secretary of State Republican primary (August 2, 1910)
Party	Candidate	Votes	%
Republican	Donald R. Fraser	32,815	51.0%
Republican	Thomas N. Robnett	31,422	49.0%
Turnout		64,237	

Socialist primary

Oklahoma Secretary of State Socialist primary (August 2, 1910)
Party	Candidate	Votes	%
Socialist	J.V. Kolachny	13,063	100%

Prohibition primary

Oklahoma Secretary of State Prohibition primary (August 2, 1910)
Party	Candidate	Votes	%
Prohibition	H.E. Strickler	72	100%

General election

1910 Oklahoma Secretary of State election
Party	Candidate	Votes	%	±%
Democratic	Ben F. Harrison	117,790	49.3%	−5.5%
Republican	Donald R. Fraser	94,180	39.4%	−1.6%
Socialist	J.V. Kolachny	23,581	9.8%	+5.9%
Prohibition	H.E. Strickler	2,931	1.2%	New
Democratic hold		Swing		

Results by county Harrison: 40–50%; 50–60%; 60–70%; Fraser: 40–50%; 50–60%

=== State Auditor ===
Democratic Primary

Oklahoma State Auditor Democratic primary (August 2, 1910)
Party	Candidate	Votes	%
Democratic	William Macklin Cross (Note: Cross died on August 3, 1910.)	59,018	54.9%
Democratic	H. S. Blair	18,332	17.1%
Democratic	H.A. Tucker	15,499	14.5%
Democratic	W.F. Gilmer	14,540	13.5%
Turnout		107,389	

Republican primary

Oklahoma State Auditor Republican primary (August 2, 1910)
Party	Candidate	Votes	%
Republican	Thomas S. Dulaney	37,613	59.5%
Republican	Joseph Wade Bone	25,696	40.5%
Turnout		63,309	

Socialist primary

Oklahoma State Auditor Socialist primary (August 2, 1910)
Party	Candidate	Votes	%
Socialist	H.A. Kembel	13,041	100%

General election

1910 Oklahoma State Auditor election
Party	Candidate	Votes	%	±%
Democratic	Leo Meyer	117,954	50.1%	−4.4%
Republican	Thomas S. Dulaney	93,749	39.8%	−1.3%
Socialist	H.A. Kembel	23,706	10.0%	+5.7%
Democratic hold		Swing		

Results by county Meyer: 40–50%; 50–60%; 60–70%; 70–80%; Dulaney: 40–50%; 50–60%

=== Attorney General ===
Democratic Primary

Oklahoma attorney general Democratic primary (August 2, 1910)
Party	Candidate	Votes	%
Democratic	Charles West (incumbent)	43,893	40.1%
Democratic	J. C. Graham	34,716	31.8%
Democratic	George D. Key	30,579	28.1%
Turnout		109,188	

Republican primary

Oklahoma attorney general Republican primary (August 2, 1910)
Party	Candidate	Votes	%
Republican	Joseph M. Dodson	24,231	36.1%
Republican	P.C. Hughes	12,536	18.6%
Republican	Don C. Smith	11,271	16.8%
Republican	Cornelius Hardy	9,768	14.5%
Republican	Malcolm D. Owen	9,259	13.8%
Turnout		67,065	

Socialist primary

Oklahoma attorney general Socialist primary (August 2, 1910)
Party	Candidate	Votes	%
Socialist	F.M. Alee	13,026	100%

General election

1910 Oklahoma attorney general election
Party	Candidate	Votes	%	±%
Democratic	Charles West (incumbent)	119,586	50.5%	−4.0%
Republican	Joseph M. Dodson	93,749	39.5%	−1.9%
Socialist	F. M. Alee	23,513	9.9%	+6.0%
Democratic hold		Swing		

Results by county West: 40–50%; 50–60%; 60–70%; 70–80%; Dodson: 40–50%; 50–60%; Tie: 40-50%

=== State Treasurer ===
Democratic Primary

Oklahoma State Treasurer Democratic primary (August 2, 1910)
Party	Candidate	Votes	%
Democratic	Robert Dunlop	56,348	55.0%
Democratic	Martin E. Trapp	46,233	45.0%
Turnout		102,581	

Republican primary

Oklahoma State Treasurer Republican primary (August 2, 1910)
Party	Candidate	Votes	%
Republican	W.H. Dill	30,171	57.2%
Republican	H.M. Spalding	20,146	31.5%
Republican	Richard Rudesill	13,538	21.3%
Turnout		63,855	

Socialist primary

Oklahoma State Treasurer Socialist primary (August 2, 1910)
Party	Candidate	Votes	%
Socialist	C.B. Boylan	13,020	100%

Prohibition primary

Oklahoma State Treasurer Prohibition primary (August 2, 1910)
Party	Candidate	Votes	%
Prohibition	E.H. Leonard	70	100%

General election

1910 Oklahoma State Treasurer election
Party	Candidate	Votes	%	±%
Democratic	Robert Dunlop	118,479	49.6%	−5.1%
Republican	W.H. Dill	93,726	39.2%	−2.2%
Socialist	C.B. Boylan	23,697	9.9%	+6.1%
Prohibition	E.H. Leonard	2,827	1.1%	New
Democratic hold		Swing		

Results by county Dunlop: 40–50%; 50–60%; 60–70%; 70–80%; Dill: 40–50%; 50–60%

=== State Superintendent ===
Democratic Primary

Oklahoma State Superintendent Democratic primary (August 2, 1910)
Party	Candidate	Votes	%
Democratic	R. H. Wilson	62,337	56.7%
Democratic	Evan Dhu Cameron (incumbent)	47,433	43.3%
Turnout		108.770	

Republican primary

Oklahoma State Superintendent Republican primary (August 2, 1910)
Party	Candidate	Votes	%
Republican	John P. Evans	25,706	37.2%
Republican	James E. Dyche	22,035	32.0%
Republican	G.D. Moss	21,269	30.8%
Turnout		69,010	

Socialist primary

Oklahoma State Superintendent Socialist primary (August 2, 1910)
Party	Candidate	Votes	%
Socialist	S.S. Smith	13,015	100%

General election

1910 Oklahoma State Superintendent election
Party	Candidate	Votes	%	±%
Democratic	R. H. Wilson	118,628	50.3%	−4.5%
Republican	John P. Evans	93,549	39.6%	−1.5%
Socialist	S.S. Smith	23,642	10.0%	+6.1%
Democratic hold		Swing		

=== State Examiner and Inspector ===
Democratic Primary

Oklahoma State Examiner and Inspector Democratic primary (August 2, 1910)
Party	Candidate	Votes	%
Democratic	Charles A. Taylor (incumbent)	64,439	66.4%
Democratic	Elias Landrum	32,486	33.5%
Turnout		96,925	

Republican primary

Oklahoma Examiner and Inspector Republican primary (August 2, 1910)
Party	Candidate	Votes	%
Republican	W. B. Lain	57,494	100%

Socialist primary

Oklahoma State Examiner and Inspector Socialist primary (August 2, 1910)
Party	Candidate	Votes	%
Socialist	W. S. Webster	12,978	100%

1910 Oklahoma State Examiner and Inspector election
Party	Candidate	Votes	%	±%
Democratic	Charles A. Taylor (incumbent)	117,519	50.0%	−4.8%
Republican	W.B. Lain	93,372	39.7%	−1.4%
Socialist	W.S. Webster	23,763	10.1%	+6.2%
Democratic hold		Swing		

=== Chief Mine Inspector ===
Democratic primary

1910 Oklahoma Chief Mine Inspector Democratic primary (August 2, 1910)
Party	Candidate	Votes	%
Democratic	Ed Boyle	51,394	51.8%
Democratic	Pete Hanraty (incumbent)	47,726	48.2%
Turnout		99,120	

Republican primary

1910 Oklahoma Chief Mine Inspector Republican primary (August 2, 1910)
Party	Candidate	Votes	%
Republican	John H. Hall	54,791	100%

Socialist primary

1910 Oklahoma Chief Mine Inspector Socialist primary (August 2, 1910)
Party	Candidate	Votes	%
Socialist	David G. Jackson	12,994	100%

General election

1910 Oklahoma Chief Mine Inspector election
Party	Candidate	Votes	%	±%
Democratic	Ed Boyle	117,248	49.8%	−5.0%
Republican	John H. Hall	93,988	39.9%	−1.2%
Socialist	David G. Jackson	24,000	10.2%	+6.3%
Democratic hold		Swing		

=== Commissioner of Labor ===
Democratic primary

1910 Oklahoma Commissioner of Labor Democratic primary (August 2, 1910)
Party	Candidate	Votes	%
Democratic	Charles L. Daugherty (incumbent)	87,617	100%

Republican primary

1910 Oklahoma Commissioner of Labor Republican primary (August 2, 1910)
Party	Candidate	Votes	%
Republican	John W. Funston	23,960	37.2%
Republican	Robert F. Hamilton	12,991	20.1%
Republican	James E. Gorman	12,279	19.0%
Republican	Fred Pell, Sr.	9,166	14.2%
Republican	D. F. Harrington	5,983	9.2%
Turnout		64,379	

Socialist primary

1910 Oklahoma Commissioner of Labor Socialist primary (August 2, 1910)
Party	Candidate	Votes	%
Socialist	F. B. Hadsall	12,952	100%

General election

1910 Oklahoma Commissioner of Labor election
Party	Candidate	Votes	%	±%
Democratic	Charles L. Daugherty (incumbent)	119,605	50.4%	−4.4%
Republican	John W. Funston	93,455	39.4%	−1.6%
Socialist	E. B. Hadsall	23,846	10.0%	+6.0%
Democratic hold		Swing		

=== Commissioner of Charities and Corrections ===
Democratic primary

1910 Oklahoma Commissioner of Charities and Corrections Democratic primary (August 2, 1910)
Party	Candidate	Votes	%
Democratic	Kate Barnard (incumbent)	72,386	67.6%
Democratic	W. F. Baker	34,580	32.3%
Turnout		106,966	

Republican primary

1910 Oklahoma Commissioner of Charities and Corrections Republican primary (August 2, 1910)
Party	Candidate	Votes	%
Republican	Kate Himrod Biggers	36,195	57.8%
Republican	Minnie Donahoe	26,360	42.1%
Turnout		62,555	

Socialist primary

1910 Oklahoma Commissioner of Charities and Corrections Socialist primary (August 2, 1910)
Party	Candidate	Votes	%
Socialist	Winnie Branstetter	12,849	100%

General election

1910 Oklahoma Commissioner of Charities and Corrections election
Party	Candidate	Votes	%	±%
Democratic	Kate Barnard (incumbent)	120,703	51.0%	−4.2%
Republican	Kate Himrod Biggers	91,907	38.8%	−1.9%
Socialist	Winnie Branstetter	23,872	10.0%	+6.1%
Democratic hold		Swing		

=== Commissioner of Insurance ===
Democratic primary

1910 Oklahoma Commissioner of Insurance Democratic primary (August 2, 1910)
Party	Candidate	Votes	%
Democratic	P. A. Ballard	25,755	25.4%
Democratic	James W. Martin	23,214	22.9%
Democratic	Milas Lasater (incumbent)	18,840	18.6%
Democratic	Seth K. Corden	13,429	13.2%
Democratic	J. L. Calvert	11,759	11.6%
Democratic	William H. Ebey	8,233	8.1%
Turnout		101,230	

Republican primary

1910 Oklahoma Commissioner of Insurance Republican primary (August 2, 1910)
Party	Candidate	Votes	%
Republican	James T. Burns	24,334	37.5%
Republican	Eugene F. Hoffman	10,884	16.8%
Republican	Fred B. Hoyt	8,659	13.3%
Republican	Fred W. Edmonds	8,640	13.3%
Republican	E. R. Hughes	7,377	11.3%
Republican	Theodore VonKeller	4,860	7.5%
Turnout		64,754	

Socialist primary

1910 Oklahoma Commissioner of Insurance Socialist primary (August 2, 1910)
Party	Candidate	Votes	%
Socialist	E. S. Maple	12,568	100%

General election

1910 Oklahoma Commissioner of Insurance election
Party	Candidate	Votes	%	±%
Democratic	P. A. Ballard	116,621	49.8%	−5.1%
Republican	James T. Burns	93,778	40.0%	−1.2%
Socialist	E. S. Maple	23,761	10.1%	+6.2%
Democratic hold		Swing		

Results by county Ballard: 40–50%; 50–60%; 60–70%; 70–80%; Burns: 40–50%; 50–60%

=== State Printer ===
Democratic primary

1910 Oklahoma State Printer Democratic primary (August 2, 1910)
Party	Candidate	Votes	%
Democratic	Giles W. Farris	39,324	41.6%
Democratic	D. C. Lester	33,704	35.7%
Democratic	J. T. Highley	21,316	22.5%
Turnout		94,344	

Republican primary

1910 Oklahoma State Printer Republican primary (August 2, 1910)
Party	Candidate	Votes	%
Republican	Samuel L. Bartholomew	30,341	52.6%
Republican	Jesse G. Curd	27,265	47.3%
Turnout		57,606	

Socialist primary

1910 Oklahoma State Printer Socialist primary (August 2, 1910)
Party	Candidate	Votes	%
Socialist	Jacob J. Truinett	12,494	100%

General election

1910 Oklahoma State Printer election
Party	Candidate	Votes	%	±%
Democratic	Giles W. Farris	117,239	50.0%	
Republican	Samuel L. Bartholomew	93,215	39.8%	
Socialist	Jacob J. Truinett	23,717	10.1%	
Democratic gain from				

=== President of State Board of Agriculture ===
Democratic primary

1910 Oklahoma President of State Board of Agriculture Democratic primary (August 2, 1910)
Party	Candidate	Votes	%
Democratic	G. T. Bryan	55,712	58.9%
Democratic	George L. Bishop	22,805	24.1%
Democratic	Joseph L. Paschal	15,940	16.8%
Turnout		94,457	

Republican primary

1910 Oklahoma President of State Board of Agriculture Republican primary (August 2, 1910)
Party	Candidate	Votes	%
Republican	William H. Beaver	48,058	100%

Socialist primary

1910 Oklahoma President of State Board of Agriculture Socialist primary (August 2, 1910)
Party	Candidate	Votes	%
Socialist	J. R. Allen	12,496	100%

General election

1910 Oklahoma President of State Board of Agriculture election
Party	Candidate	Votes	%
Democratic	G.T. Bryan	117,203	50.0%
Republican	William H. Beaver	93,429	39.8%
Socialist	J.R. Allen	23,649	10.0%
Democratic hold			

=== Corporation Commission ===
1910 Oklahoma Corporation Commissioner Democratic primary (August 2, 1910)
Party	Candidate	Votes	%
Democratic	George A. Henshaw	30,004	30.2%
Democratic	R. P. Bowles	19,606	19.7%
Democratic	George L. Wilson	14,201	14.2%
Democratic	Joseph Strain	13,488	13.5%
Democratic	G. M. Tucker	9,429	9.4%
Democratic	J. A. Norman	8,594	8.6%
Democratic	Thomas R. Lash	4,004	4.0%
Turnout		99,326	

Republican primary

1910 Oklahoma Corporation Commissioner Republican primary (August 2, 1910)
Party	Candidate	Votes	%
Republican	Emory Brownlee	23,929	41.0%
Republican	Sherman W. Hill	16,827	28.8%
Republican	J. B. Queen	9,592	16.4%
Republican	J. Harrie Cloonan	7,912	13.5%
Turnout		58,260	

Socialist primary

1910 Oklahoma Corporation Commissioner Socialist primary (August 2, 1910)
Party	Candidate	Votes	%
Socialist	J. F. McDaniel	12,427	100%

General election

1910 Oklahoma Corporation Commissioner election
Party	Candidate	Votes	%	±%
Democratic	George A. Henshaw	117,444	50.1%	−4.6%
Republican	Emory Brownlee	93,050	39.7%	−1.5%
Socialist	J. F. McDaniel	23,835	10.1%	+6.2%
Democratic hold		Swing		

=== Clerk of the Supreme Court ===
Democratic primary

1910 Oklahoma Clerk of the Supreme Court Democratic primary (August 2, 1910)
Party	Candidate	Votes	%
Democratic	Swamp Campbell	39,921	39.8%
Democratic	L. K. Taylor	25,624	26.2%
Democratic	Neil B. Gardner	19,030	19.5%
Democratic	N. A. Gordon	14,006	14.3%
Turnout		97,581	

Republican primary

1910 Oklahoma Clerk of the Supreme Court Republican primary (August 2, 1910)
Party	Candidate	Votes	%
Republican	Amos E. Ewing	23,308	100%

Socialist primary

1910 Oklahoma Clerk of the Supreme Court Socialist primary (August 2, 1910)
Party	Candidate	Votes	%
Socialist	H. M. Sinclair	12,391	100%

General election

1910 Oklahoma Clerk of the Supreme Court election
Party	Candidate	Votes	%	±%
Democratic	Swamp Campbell (incumbent)	117,571	50.0%	−5.0%
Republican	Chas. C. Chapell	93,645	39.8%	−1.3%
Socialist	H.M. Sinclair	23,721	10.0%	+6.3%
Democratic hold		Swing		

=== Oklahoma Supreme Court ===
==== District 3 ====
Democratic primary

1910 Oklahoma Supreme Court Democratic primary (August 2, 1910)
Party	Candidate	Votes	%
Democratic	Matthew John Kane (incumbent)	14,710	100%

Republican primary

Oklahoma Supreme Court Republican primary (August 2, 1910)
Party	Candidate	Votes	%
Republican	A. J. Biddison	11,009	62.4%
Republican	A. R. Mussellner	6,609	37.5%
Turnout		17,618	

General election

1910 Oklahoma Supreme Court District 3 election
Party	Candidate	Votes	%	±%
Democratic	Matthew John Kane (incumbent)	118,020	55.8%	−1.2%
Republican	A.J. Biddison	93,159	44.1%	+1.2%
Democratic hold		Swing		

==== District 5 ====
Democratic primary

1910 Oklahoma Supreme Court Democratic primary (August 2, 1910)
Party	Candidate	Votes	%
Democratic	Jesse James Dunn (incumbent)	16,765	100%

Republican primary

Oklahoma Supreme Court Republican primary (August 2, 1910)
Party	Candidate	Votes	%
Republican	L. M. Keys	7,186	56.5%
Republican	Henry J. Sturgis	5,531	43.4%
Turnout		12,717	

General election

1910 Oklahoma Supreme Court District 5 election
Party	Candidate	Votes	%	±%
Democratic	Jesse James Dunn (incumbent)	118,548	56.0%	−0.5%
Republican	L. M. Keys	93,076	43.9%	+0.5%
Democratic hold		Swing		

=== Court of Criminal Appeals ===
==== Eastern district ====
Democratic primary

1910 Oklahoma Court of Criminal Appeals Eastern District Democratic primary (August 2, 1910)
Party	Candidate	Votes	%
Democratic	James R. Armstrong	13,264	41.9%
Democratic	J. H. Linebaugh	12,086	38.2%
Democratic	D. A. McDougal	6,256	19.8%
Democratic	Woodson Norvell	39	0.001%
Turnout		31645	

Republican primary

1910 Oklahoma Court of Criminal Appeals Eastern District Republican primary(August 2, 1910)
Party	Candidate	Votes	%
Republican	Thomas C. Humphrey	11,009	100%

General Election

1910 Oklahoma Court of Criminal Appeals Eastern District election
Party	Candidate	Votes	%
Democratic	James R. Armstrong	117,409	55.6%
Republican	Thomas C. Humphrey	93,601	44.3%
Democratic gain from			

==== Northern district ====
Democratic Primary

1910 Oklahoma Court of Criminal Appeals Northern District Democratic primary (August 2, 1910)
Party	Candidate	Votes	%
Democratic	Thomas H. Doyle	16,225	63.3%
Democratic	William L. Eagleton	9,384	36.6%
Turnout		25609	

Republican primary

1910 Oklahoma Court of Criminal Appeals Northern District Republican primary (August 2, 1910)
Party	Candidate	Votes	%
Republican	Erskine Snoddy	21,183	100%

General election

1910 Oklahoma Court of Criminal Appeals Northern District election
Party	Candidate	Votes	%
Democratic	Thomas H. Doyle (incumbent)	117,933	55.7%
Republican	Erskine Snoddy	93,468	44.2%
Democratic hold			

==== Southern district ====
Democratic primary

1910 Oklahoma Court of Criminal Appeals Southern District Democratic primary (August 2, 1910)
Party	Candidate	Votes	%
Democratic	Henry Marshall Furman	34,642	100%

Republican primary

1910 Oklahoma Court of Criminal Appeals Southern District Republican primary (August 2, 1910)
Party	Candidate	Votes	%
Republican	Dwight Brown	11,064	100%

General election

1910 Oklahoma Court of Criminal Appeals Southern District election
Party	Candidate	Votes	%
Democratic	Henry Marshall Furman (incumbent)	117,704	56.0%
Republican	Dwight Brown	92,293	43.9%
Democratic hold			

=== Assistant Mine Inspector ===
==== District 1 ====
1910 Oklahoma Assistant Mine Inspector District 1 election
Party	Candidate	Votes	%
Democratic	John O'Brien	116,253	49.8%
Republican	George Harris	93,115	39.9%
Socialist	Geo. F. Brady	23,849	10.2%
Democratic hold			

==== District 2 ====
1910 Oklahoma Assistant Mine Inspector District 2 election
Party	Candidate	Votes	%
Democratic	Martin Clark	115,757	49.3%
Republican	A.G. Hamilton	93,339	39.7%
Socialist	E.L. Goodman	25,523	10.8%
Democratic hold			

==== District 3 ====
1910 Oklahoma Assistant Mine Inspector District 3 election
Party	Candidate	Votes	%
Democratic	Frank Haley	116,085	55.7%
Republican	Michael O'Hara	92,207	44.2%
Democratic hold			

=== State Questions ===
==== State question 6 ====
State Question No. 6 Initiative Petition No. 2 The gist of the proposition is as follows: The selection by a majority vote of New Jerusalem District composed of not less than six sections of land compactly located within fifty miles of the center of the State; citizens may offer site, description, descriptions and options showing cost filed with Secretary and printed for information of voter; platting model city, public building reservations, remainder sold at public auction at appraised value or more; after repaying cost of public proceeds used equally for public buildings and improvements within District; State Institutions hereafter located must be in districts.

State question
Choice	Votes	%
For	84,366	41.51
Against	118,899	58.49
Total	203,265	100.00

==== State question 8 ====
State Question No. 8 Initiative Petition No. 3 The gist of the proposition is as follows: To authorize women to vote under the same circumstances and conditions as men may now do under the laws of this State, and this purpose is effected by striking out the word "male" wherever it exists as a limitation in Section 1 of Article 3 of the Constitution.

State question
Choice	Votes	%
For	88,808	40.79
Against	128,928	59.21
Total	217,736	100.00

==== State question 15 ====
State Question No. 15 Initiative Petition No. 7 The gist of the proposition is as follows: "A proposition to permanently locate State Capitol; Creating Commission of three to be appointed by Governor, January 1, 1911, or sooner; defines powers and duties; appropriates six hundred thousand dollars to purchase not to exceed two thousand acres; State to be reimbursed from sale of lots; Capitol fund created therefrom; Board may exercise power of eminent domain. Said Commission and School Land Commission to appraise value of lands and improvements separately. Makes Oklahoma City, Guthrie and Shawnee candidates; Provides for others by petition. Proposed separately to determine questions; (1) Shall Capitol be located, and (2) Where."

State question
Choice	Votes	%
For	96,448	59.92
Against	64,522	40.08
Total	160,970	100.00

1910 State Capital election
Candidate	Votes	%
Oklahoma City	96,261	70.8
Guthrie	31,301	23.0
Shawnee	8,382	6.2
Total votes	135,944	100

==== State question 16 ====
State Question No. 16 Initiative Petition No. 8 The gist of the proposition is as follows: That an extra section be added to Article 9 of the Constitution directing that any railroad, transportation or transmission company organized under the laws, of any other State, the United States or any Territory thereof, owning or operating, or wishing to extend a line or lines through this State may have the right and power to conduct such business after they have filed a copy of their articles of incorporation with the Secretary of State and appointed a resident agent upon whom legal process may be served.

State question
Choice	Votes	%
For	53,784	33.20
Against	108,205	66.80
Total	161,989	100.00

==== State question 17 ====
State Question No. 16 Initiative Petition No. 10 The gist of the proposition is as follows: That no person shall be registered as an elector in this State, be allowed to vote in any election held herein, unless he be able to read and write any section of the Constitution of the State of Oklahoma; but no person who was, on January 1, 1866, or at any time prior thereto, entitled to vote, under any form of Government, or who at that time resided in some foreign nation, and no lineal descendent of such person, shall be denied the right to register and vote because of his inability to so read and write sections of the Constitution. Precinct election inspectors having in charge the registration of electors shall enforce the provisions of this section at the time of registration, provided registration be required. Should registration be dispensed with, the provisions of this section shall be enforced by the precinct election officers when the electors apply for ballots to vote.

State question
Choice	Votes	%
For	135,443	56.05
Against	106,222	43.95
Total	241,665	100.00

==== State question 21 ====
State Question No. 21 Referendum Petition No. 12 The gist of the proposition is as follows: A law* prescribing the time and manner of conducting general elections, creates a State Election Board, appointed by the Governor, not more than two of the same political party; chairman of the managing committee of each of the two political parties having cast the largest number of votes in the last preceding general election may at any time submit to the Governor the names of not less tham five members of their respective political parties. In making said appointments preference shall be given to the names so submitted.

State question
Choice	Votes	%
For	80,146	42.95
Against	106,459	57.05
Total	186,605	100.00

==== State question 22 ====
State Question No. 22 Initiative Petition No. 11 The gist of the proposition is as follows: To amend Section 7, Article 1 of the Constitution and to provide for the licensed sale of intoxicating liquors in incorporated cities, towns and villages after an election to determine whether said municipality shall license the sale of liquors to be consumed on the premises at a cost of two thousand dollars per year, and the sale in original packages not to be there consumed at a cost of five hundred dollars per year for each license, with restrictions, as to Sunday and midnight closing, prohibiting treating and other restrictions.

State question
Choice	Votes	%
For	105,041	45.44
Against	126,118	54.56
Total	231,159	100.00

==== State question 23 ====
State Question No. 23 Legislative Petition No. 13 Submitted by Senate Joint Resolution No. 1, page 278, Session Laws 1910. The gist of the proposition is as follows: That all taxes derived from public service corporations operating in more than one county of the state to be paid into the State Treasury and distributed as are other common school funds

State question
Choice	Votes	%
For	101,636	70.21
Against	43,133	29.79
Required majority		123834
Total	144,769	100.00

==== State question 24 ====
State Question No. 24 Legislative Petition No. 14 Submitted by Senate Joint Resolution No. 12, page 645, Session Laws 1909. The gist of the proposition is as follows: Public Service corporations that have organized under the laws of the State of Oklahoma shall not be allowed to abate full jurisdiction over them by said State on account of any transfer to or consolidation with a foreign corporation.

State question
Choice	Votes	%
For	83,169	60.12
Against	55,175	39.88
Required majority		123834
Total	138,344	100.00

==== State question 25 ====
State Question No. 25 Legislative Petition No. 15 The gist of the proposition is as follows: That an extra section be added to Article 9 of the Constitution directing that any railroad transportation or transmission company organized under the laws of any other State, the United States or any Territory thereof owning or operating or wishing to extend a line or lines through this State may have the right and power to conduct such business after they have filed a copy of their articles of incorporation with the Secretary of State and appointed a resident agent upon whom legal process may be served.

State question
Choice	Votes	%
For	41,768	47.23
Against	46,662	52.77
Total	88,430	100.00
