= 11th Oklahoma Legislature =

Leadership
- President of the Senate: William J. Holloway (D)
- President Pro Tem of the Senate: Mac Q. Williamson (D)
- Speaker of the House: D.A. Stovall (D)
- Composition: Senate; 35 9 House; 83 22

The Eleventh Oklahoma Legislature was a meeting of the legislative branch of the government of Oklahoma, composed of the Oklahoma Senate and the Oklahoma House of Representatives. The state legislature met in Oklahoma City, in regular session from January 4 to March 24, 1927, and in special session from December 6 through 29, 1927, during the term of Governor Henry S. Johnston.

== Dates of sessions ==
- Regular session: January 4-March 24, 1927
- Special session: December 6–29, 1927

Previous: 10th Legislature • Next: 12th Legislature

== Party composition ==
=== Senate ===
Affiliation	Party (Shading indicates majority caucus)		Total
Affiliation	Democratic	Republican	Total
	35	9	44
Voting share	79.5%	20.5%	

=== House of Representatives ===
Affiliation	Party (Shading indicates majority caucus)		Total
Affiliation	Democratic	Republican	Total
	83	22	105
Voting share	79%	21%	

== Leadership ==
Lieutenant Governor William J. Holloway served as President of the Senate, giving him a tie-breaking vote and the authority to serve as presiding officer. Mac Q. Williamson served as President pro tempore of the Oklahoma Senate in 1927. D.A. Stovall served as Speaker of the Oklahoma House of Representatives.

== Members ==
=== Senate ===
District	Name	Party
1	W. H. Loofbourrow	Dem
2	Stanley Shepherd	Dem
2	E.M. Reed	Dem
3	D. H. Powers	Rep
4	Mrs. Lamar Looney	Dem
5	W. C. Austin	Dem
6	S.G. Thomas	Dem
6	A.E. Darnell	Dem
7	Ira Hill	Rep
8	William Otjen	Rep
9	W. T. Clark	Rep
10	Jo Ferguson	Rep
11	Fletcher Johnson	Dem
12	Joe Shearer	Rep
13	Thomas C. Waldrep	Dem
13	George Peck	Dem
14	John L. Rice	Dem
14	W.C. Fidler	Dem
15	Gordon Gray	Dem
15	Jed Johnson	Dem
16	W.P. Kimerer	Rep
17	C. S. Storms	Dem
17	Dave Boyer	Dem
18	Jess Pullen	Dem
18	U.T. Rexroat	Dem
19	E. V. George	Dem
19	Mac Q. Williamson	Dem
20	J.H. McCurley	Dem
20	J. N. Nesbitt	Dem
21	D. A. Shaw	Dem
22	Tom Anglin	Dem
23	Lester E. Smith	Dem
24	Paul Stewart	Dem
25	Guy Andrews	Dem
26	Felix Simmons	Dem
27	W.M. Gulager	Dem
27	W.G. Stigler	Dem
28	John Goodall	Dem
29	R. L. Wheatley	Dem
30	H.L. Marshall	Rep
31	C. H. Terwilleger	Rep
32	Amos Holland Culp	Dem
33	Gid Graham	Dem
34	G.I. Van Dall	Dem

- Table based on state almanac.

=== House of Representatives ===
Name	Party	County
Frank Adair	Dem	Adair
Oliver Henderson	Dem	Alfalfa
P. R. Crowley	Dem	Atoka
C. E. Baggerly	Dem	Beaver, Harper
Frank Carmichael	Dem	Beckham
Elias Smith	Dem	Blaine
A. N. Leecraft	Dem	Bryan
J. B. Smith	Dem	Bryan
Harry Jolly	Dem	Caddo
Lewis Ware	Rep	Caddo
J. B. Deardorff	Dem	Canadian
Earl Brown	Dem	Carter
Arleigh Davis	Dem	Carter
Charles Rogers	Dem	Cherokee
O. A. Brewer	Dem	Choctaw
Frank Sewell	Dem	Cimarron, Texas
C. T. Lane	Dem	Cleveland
C. Leslie Cardwell	Dem	Coal
J. A. Johnson	Dem	Comanche
James C. Nance	Dem	Cotton
Bryant Cash	Dem	Craig
W. G. Beatty	Dem	Creek
Sebe A. Christian	Dem	Creek
J. A. Watson	Dem	Creek
Thomas P. Stone	Dem	Custer
James Butler	Rep	Delaware
V. D. McArthur	Rep	Dewey
George Baldwin	Dem	Ellis
J. B. Campbell	Rep	Garfield
Arthur Strauss	Rep	Garfield
Homer Paul	Dem	Garvin
James M. Thompson	Dem	Garvin
David C. Hybarger	Dem	Grady
Frank Manning	Dem	Grady
T. E. Beck	Rep	Grant
J. G. H. Windle	Dem	Greer
R. B. Bryant	Dem	Harmon
O. P. Nash	Dem	Haskell
W. F. Gilmer	Dem	Hughes
A. E. Bilbrey	Dem	Jackson
J. T. Daniel	Dem	Jefferson
Kenneth Clark	Dem	Johnston
John M. Bell	Dem	Kay
Gilford Chappell	Rep	Kay
Robert B. McClintic	Rep	Kingfisher
J. E. Watson	Dem	Kiowa
Claud Briggs	Dem	Latimer
F. W. Bird	Dem	LeFlore
John J. Thomas	Dem	LeFlore
J. B. Pomeroy	Rep	Lincoln
B. Taylor	Rep	Lincoln
O. B. Acton	Rep	Logan
Woody Dixon	Dem	Love
John Voorhees	Rep	Major
David L. Faulk	Dem	Marshall
A. Lee Battenfield	Dem	Mayes
J. Nealy Forehand	Dem	McClain
E. E. Cochran	Dem	McCurtain
James Dyer	Dem	McCurtain
Lattie Ogden	Dem	McIntosh
Oscar Lowrance	Dem	Murray
Albert Berry	Dem	Muskogee
Charles Moon	Dem	Muskogee
Tom B. O'Bryan	Dem	Muskogee
W. R. Fry	Rep	Noble
James Nairn	Dem	Nowata
Joe L. Dukes	Dem	Okfuskee
R.A. Billups Jr.	Dem	Oklahoma
Ben F. Davis	Dem	Oklahoma
Bob Graham	Dem	Oklahoma
Anna Laskey	Dem	Oklahoma
C. R. Reeves	Dem	Oklahoma
R. A. Singletary	Dem	Oklahoma
David Logan	Dem	Okmulgee
Tom Payne	Dem	Okmulgee
Virgie Riddle	Dem	Okmulgee
Martin Fraley	Dem	Osage
Clarence Lohman	Dem	Osage
Perry Porter	Dem	Ottawa
R. W. Skinner	Dem	Ottawa
W. D. Webber	Rep	Pawnee
Guy McLaury	Dem	Payne
J. W. Reece	Dem	Payne
E. P. Hill	Dem	Pittsburg
D. L. Roe	Dem	Pittsburg
Frank Watson	Dem	Pittsburg
W. H. Ebey	Dem	Pottawatomie
Will H. Thompson	Dem	Pottawatomie
Tom Johnson	Dem	Pushmataha
W. R. Trent	Rep	Roger Mills
Tom Kight	Dem	Rogers
Bart Aldridge	Dem	Seminole
T. M. McCombs	Dem	Sequoyah
P. D. Sullivan	Dem	Stephens
R. L. Christian	Dem	Tillman
L. O. Maxwell	Rep	Tulsa
O. O. Owens	Rep	Tulsa
G. C. Thomas	Rep	Tulsa
Hugh Webster	Rep	Tulsa
D. A. Wilson	Rep	Tulsa
Horace Foster	Dem	Wagoner
A. C. Easter	Rep	Washington
Ed Hines	Dem	Washita
Erskine Snoddy	Rep	Woods
Willis James	Dem	Woodward

- Table based on government database.
