= Twin-Territories Federation of Labor =

The Twin-Territories Federation of Labor was a labor union in the U.S. territories of Oklahoma Territory and Indian Territory between 1903 and 1906.

== History ==
In March 1903 J. Harvey Lynch called for the organization of a larger labor union to better represent workers in Oklahoma Territory and Indian Territory. At the time dozens of unions had popped up to replace the declining Knights of Labor. Forty-one delegates met at the Odd Fellows Hall in Lawton, Oklahoma in December 1903. It was attended by future U.S. Senator from Oklahoma Thomas Gore; Pete Hanraty was elected as president of the convention and Lynch served as secretary. At the time of its formation it claimed to represent 12,000 workers and collected five cents monthly dues per member.

On February 15, 1904, the union was officially chartered by American Federation of Labor president Samuel Gompers. The organization focused on the issue of Oklahoma statehood. They also sought to gain political influence after statehood and influence the Oklahoma Constitutional Convention. In 1906, the group merged into the Oklahoma State Federation of Labor.

== List of presidents ==
- Pete Hanraty (1903-1906)
