= Oklahoma State Federation of Labor =

The Oklahoma State Federation of Labor was a labor union in the US state of Oklahoma formed just before statehood in 1906. The union merged into the Oklahoma State AFL-CIO in October 1957.

== History ==
The Oklahoma State Federation of Labor was founded in 1906 by members of the Twin-Territories Federation of Labor in preparation for statehood. The organization worked to influence the Oklahoma Constitutional Convention. Their member, Pete Hanraty served as the vice-president of the convention. After the convention the Oklahoma Constitution was considered the most pro-labor state constitution in the United States. In 1921, the organization worked with other groups to form the Farmer-Labor Reconstruction League and elect Oklahoma City mayor Jack C. Walton as the Governor of Oklahoma. In 1937, the organization largely collapsed over infighting regarding the organizations newspaper, the Oklahoma Federationist. After World War II the organization focused on supporting pro-labor policies until it merged with the Oklahoma AFL-CIO in October 1957.
