= Senator Wyatt =

Senator Wyatt may refer to:

- David Wyatt (politician) (1949–2015), Arkansas State Senate
- Thomas Charles Wyatt (1850–1922), Tennessee State Senate
