= George A. Henshaw =

American politician

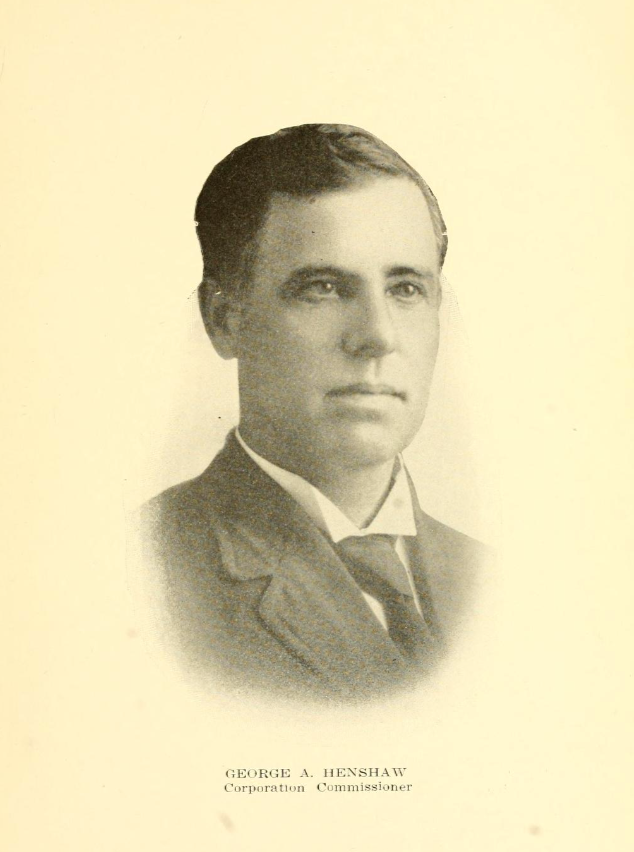

Member of the Oklahoma Corporation Commission
- In office January 1911 – January 1917
- Governor: Lee Cruce
- Preceded by: J. J. McAlester
- Succeeded by: Campbell Russell

Personal details
- Party: Democratic Party
- Education: North Indiana Law School

George A. Henshaw was an American politician who served on the Oklahoma Corporation Commission between 1911 and 1917.

== Biography ==
George A. Henshaw was raised in Illinois and graduated from North Indiana Law School in 1894. In 1897, he was hired to represent the Miners' Union during a strike. In 1900, he moved to Oklahoma. He was a delegate to the Oklahoma Constitutional Convention and later served as an assistant attorney general until his election to the Oklahoma Corporation Commission in the 1910 Oklahoma elections to succeed J. J. McAlester.

== Electoral history ==
1910 Oklahoma Corporation Commissioner Democratic primary (August 2, 1910)
Party	Candidate	Votes	%
Democratic	George A. Henshaw	30,004	30.2%
Democratic	R. P. Bowles	19,606	19.7%
Democratic	George L. Wilson	14,201	14.2%
Democratic	Joseph Strain	13,488	13.5%
Democratic	G. M. Tucker	9,429	9.4%
Democratic	J. A. Norman	8,594	8.6%
Democratic	Thomas R. Lash	4,004	4.0%
Turnout		99,326	

1910 Oklahoma Corporation Commissioner election
Party	Candidate	Votes	%	±%
Democratic	George A. Henshaw	117,444	50.1%	−4.6%
Republican	Emory Brownlee	93,050	39.7%	−1.5%
Socialist	J. F. McDaniel	23,835	10.1%	+6.2%
Democratic hold		Swing		
