= David Hogg (disambiguation) =

David Hogg (born 2000) is an American gun control advocate and politician.

David Hogg may also refer to:

- David Hogg (Irish politician) (1840–1914), Scottish-born Irish politician
- David Hogg (Oklahoma politician) (1850–1918), American politician from Oklahoma Territory
- David Hogg (Indiana politician) (1886–1973), U.S. representative from Indiana
- Davie Hogg (born 1946), Scottish footballer
- David R. Hogg (born 1958), United States Army general

== See also ==
- David L. Hoggan (1923–1988), American author
- David Hoggan (footballer) (born 1961), Scottish footballer
