= G. T. Bryan =

American politician (1864-?)

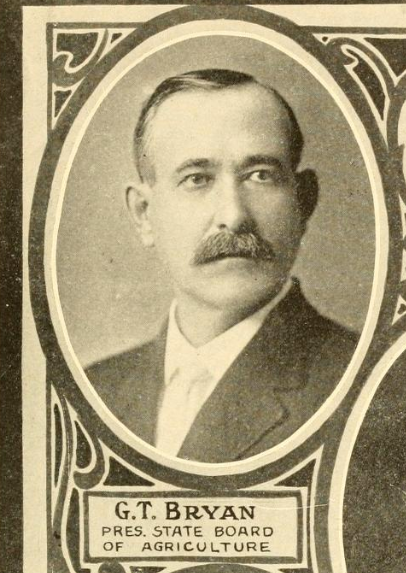

President of the Oklahoma State Board of Agriculture
- In office January 1911 – January 1915
- Governor: Lee Cruce
- Preceded by: Position established
- Succeeded by: Frank M. Gault

Personal details
- Born: 1864 Buchanan County, Missouri, US
- Died: Unknown
- Party: Democratic Party

G. T. Bryan was an American politician who served as the first elected President of the Oklahoma State Board of Agriculture from 1911 to 1915.

== Biography ==
G. T. Bryan was born in Buchanan County, Missouri in 1864. In 1893, he participated in the Cherokee Strip land run and settled near Perry, Oklahoma. He was appointed to the inaugural Oklahoma State Board of Agriculture and was the first elected President of the board after the 1910 Oklahoma elections.

== Electoral history ==
1910 Oklahoma President of State Board of Agriculture Democratic primary (August 2, 1910)
Party	Candidate	Votes	%
Democratic	G. T. Bryan	55,712	58.9%
Democratic	George L. Bishop	22,805	24.1%
Democratic	Joseph L. Paschal	15,940	16.8%
Turnout		94,457	

1910 Oklahoma President of State Board of Agriculture election
Party	Candidate	Votes	%
Democratic	G.T. Bryan	117,203	50.0%
Republican	William H. Beaver	93,429	39.8%
Socialist	J.R. Allen	23,649	10.0%
Democratic hold			
