= Charles M. McClain =

American politician

Charles M. McClain was a delegate to the Oklahoma Constitutional Convention in 1906. McClain County, Oklahoma is named in honor of him.
