= Lamar Looney =

American politician (1871–1935)

Mrs. Lamar Looney

Member of the Oklahoma Senate from the 4th district
- In office 1920–1928
- Preceded by: George L. Wilson
- Succeeded by: Harry D. Henry

Personal details
- Born: Mirabeau Lamar Cole; January 16, 1871 Talladega, Alabama, United States
- Died: September 3, 1935 (aged 64) Oklahoma City, Oklahoma, United States
- Party: Democratic
- Spouse: "Doc" Tourney Looney
- Profession: Farmer and former Harmon County Clerk

Mirabeau Lamar Looney (January 16, 1871 – September 3, 1935) was the first female member of the Oklahoma Senate. Looney was elected to public office as the registrar of deeds for Harmon County in 1912 and later as Harmon County Clerk in 1916 before women received the right to vote. In 1920, an amendment to the U.S. Constitution gave all women of the United States voting privileges, the same year that Looney ran for and was elected to the Oklahoma Senate. Looney served from 1920 until 1928, representing District 4. In 1926, she considered running for Lieutenant Governor but abandoned the race knowing that the courts would hold to the Oklahoma constitutional requirement that a man hold the office. Looney then decided to run for a spot in the U.S. Senate but lost her bid and returned to her fourth and final term in the Oklahoma Senate. Looney would remain the only woman in the Oklahoma Senate until 1975.

== Early life ==
Lamar Looney was born Mirabeau Lamar Cole on January 16, 1871 in Talladega, Alabama. She was named after the second president of the sovereign Republic of Texas, Mirabeau B. Lamar. Looney's father was a lawyer and as a child she enjoyed reading his law books in her spare time. In 1891, Looney married "Doc" Tourney Looney and the two crossed into the future Greer/Harmon County area in the southwestern part of Oklahoma Territory. Soon after, Looney was widowed, left to raise five children all under the age of ten by herself. Doc had served as the postmaster of Hollis, Oklahoma, and in the event of his death, Looney succeeded him in that job and became the postmistress. In addition to the postmistress position, she taught music at their home for a year to provide for herself and her children. Looney sold her musical instruments in order to purchase farming equipment and filed a claim on a quarter section of land one mile from Hollis and with the help of her ten-year-old son planted their first crop of 20 acres. In 1906, a year prior to statehood, she received the land patent for the farm and Looney moved her family to Hollis in order for the children to attend better schools.

=== Career ===
In 1912, Looney was elected as the registrar of deeds for Harmon County and was later elected as the county treasurer. In 1916, she was elected as the Harmon County Clerk, and served in all of these public offices before women had received the constitutional right to vote.

With women's suffrage on the horizon, several friends convinced Looney to run for the Oklahoma Senate. Looney purchased a car and drove around to campaign for votes. Looney was for universal suffrage and was an advocate for care of the elderly and children.

== Oklahoma Senate ==
During her campaign, Looney's expenditures totaled $149.80. On the ballot she used her middle name, Lamar, because it is generally considered a masculine name and she figured this would be a successful tactic for voting. She was a progressive democrat that fought for women's right to vote and serve in public offices. She was also passionate about increasing funding for rural schools, as she was for helping the Oklahoma farmer. During her first term in office, Looney introduced 28 bills. On December 10, 1923, while in office, Looney was admitted to the Oklahoma Bar Association. Looney was idealistically practical and was always searching for ways to save taxpayer's money.

=== Senate Committees ===
- Chair of the State and County Affairs Committee
- Chair of the Agricultural Committee
- Chair of the Prohibition Enforcement Committee

On September 3, 1935, Looney died due to a heart disease in a hospital in Oklahoma City, Oklahoma. Her casket was placed in the Capitol Rotunda and the flags were flown at half-mast in her honor. Her portrait now hangs on the fourth floor of the Oklahoma State Capitol.
