= Ed Boyle =

American politician

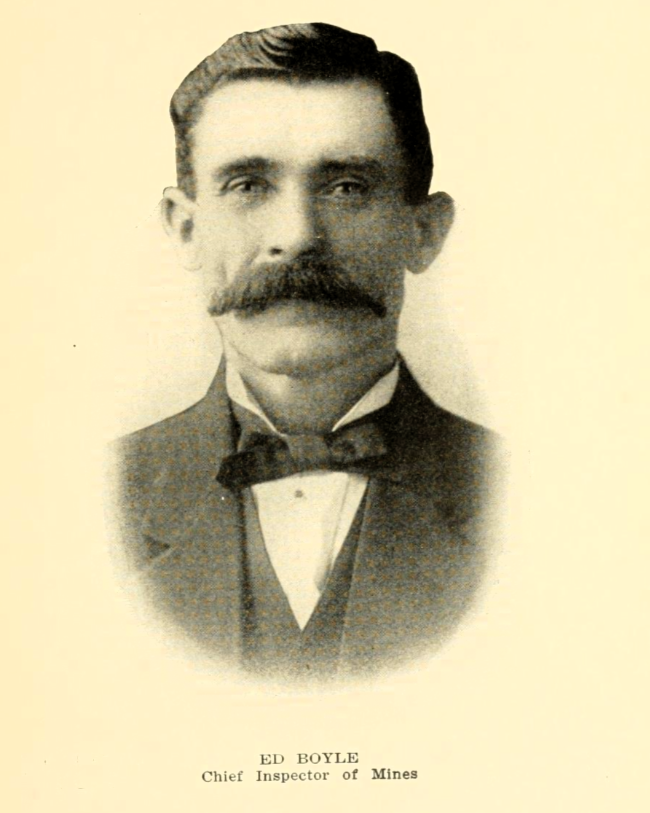
- Boyle circa 1910

2nd Chief Mine Inspector of Oklahoma
- In office January 1911 – January 1927
- Governor: Lee Cruce; Robert L. Williams; James B. A. Robertson; Jack C. Walton; Martin E. Trapp
- Preceded by: Pete Hanraty
- Succeeded by: Miller D. Hay

Member of the Oklahoma House of Representatives
- In office November 16, 1907 – November 16, 1910
- Preceded by: Position established
- Succeeded by: H. H. Edwards
- Constituency: Haskell County

Personal details
- Born: 1867 Kentucky, US
- Died: July 17, 1935 (aged 67–68)
- Political party: Democratic Party

Ed Boyle was an American politician who served as the Oklahoma Chief Mine Inspector and in the Oklahoma House of Representatives representing Haskell County.

== Biography ==
Ed Boyle was born in 1867 in Kentucky. He moved to Missouri in 1897 and worked there as a miner, participating in a 1898 strike. He worked on the 1899 gubernatorial campaign for William Goebel, before his assassination. After working the campaign, he moved to Texas before settling in Indian Territory in 1901. He was elected to the Oklahoma House of Representatives in 1907 and reelected without opposition in 1908. He was elected as a member of the Democratic Party as Chief Mine Inspector in the 1910 Oklahoma elections, defeating incumbent Pete Hanraty. He served in office from 1911 to 1927. He was admitted to the Oklahoma Bar Association in 1923, but never practiced. He ran in the 1926 Oklahoma gubernatorial election as an independent. He died of a stroke on July 17, 1935.

== Electoral history ==
1910 Oklahoma Chief Mine Inspector Democratic primary (August 2, 1910)
Party	Candidate	Votes	%
Democratic	Ed Boyle	51,394	51.8%
Democratic	Pete Hanraty (incumbent)	47,726	48.2%
Turnout		99,120	

1910 Oklahoma Chief Mine Inspector election
Party	Candidate	Votes	%	±%
Democratic	Ed Boyle	117,248	49.8%	−5.0%
Republican	John H. Hall	93,988	39.9%	−1.2%
Socialist	David G. Jackson	24,000	10.2%	+6.3%
Democratic hold		Swing		

1914 Oklahoma Chief Mine Inspector Democratic primary (August 4, 1914)
Party	Candidate	Votes	%
Democratic	Ed Boyle	37,905	36.7%
Democratic	Pete Hanraty	26,366	25.5%
Democratic	Martin Clark	25,220	24.4%
Democratic	J. H. Needham	13,556	13.1%
Turnout		103,047	

1914 Oklahoma Chief Mine Inspector election
Party	Candidate	Votes	%	±%
Democratic	Ed Boyle	107,605	45.5%	−4.3%
Republican	Pat W. Malloy	75,266	31.8%	−8.1%
Socialist	Patrick O'Shea	53,266	22.5%	+10.3%
Democratic hold		Swing		

1926 Oklahoma gubernatorial election
Party	Candidate	Votes	%	±%
Democratic	Henry S. Johnston	213,167	55.0	+0.6%
Republican	Omer K. Benedict	170,714	44.0	−0.7%
Farmer–Labor	John Franing	1,646	0.4	New
Socialist	E. H. H. Gates	1,350	0.3	−0.4%
Independent	Ed Boyle	431	0.1	N/A
Democratic hold		Swing	+0.6%	
