= George L. Wilson =

American politician (1853–1924)

Member of the Oklahoma Senate from the 4th district
- In office 1916–1920
- Preceded by: J. L. Carpenter
- Succeeded by: Lamar Looney

Member of the Oklahoma House of Representatives from the Greer County district
- In office November 16, 1908 – November 16, 1910 Serving with J. J. Savage (Note: Greer County was a top-two district during the 2nd Oklahoma Legislature.)
- Preceded by: George W. Briggs
- Succeeded by: K. C. Cox

Personal details
- Born: 1853 Jersey County, Illinois, U.S.
- Died: July 17, 1924 Mangum, Oklahoma, U.S.
- Party: Democratic Party

George L. Wilson was an American politician who served in the Oklahoma House of Representatives from 1908 to 1910 and in the Oklahoma Senate from 1916 to 1920.

== Biography ==
George L. Wilson was born in 1853 in Jersey County, Illinois, and moved to Texas in 1876. In 1901, he moved to Oklahoma Territory. He later served as mayor of Mangum, Oklahoma.

Wilson campaign for the Oklahoma House of Representatives in 1908 seeking the Democratic Party's nomination to represent Greer County. He won the primary with 375 votes to incumbent George W. Briggs's 284 votes. He was later elected in a top-two general election alongside J. J. Savage.

In 1910, he campaigned for Oklahoma Corporation Commissioner, but lost the Democratic primary to George A. Henshaw.

Wilson later represented the 4th district of the Oklahoma Senate from 1916 to 1920. He defeated fellow Democrat C. W. Gilliland in the 1916 August primary election. He defeated Socialist candidate John G. Wills in the general election. He ran for reelection in 1920, but lost the Democratic primary to Lamar Looney.

He died on July 17, 1924, in Mangum, Oklahoma, of "heart failure."

== Electoral history ==
1910 Oklahoma Corporation Commissioner Democratic primary (August 2, 1910)
Party	Candidate	Votes	%
Democratic	George A. Henshaw	30,004	30.2%
Democratic	R. P. Bowles	19,606	19.7%
Democratic	George L. Wilson	14,201	14.2%
Democratic	Joseph Strain	13,488	13.5%
Democratic	G. M. Tucker	9,429	9.4%
Democratic	J. A. Norman	8,594	8.6%
Democratic	Thomas R. Lash	4,004	4.0%
Turnout		99,326	
