= 1926 Oklahoma gubernatorial election =

- November 2, 1926

Nominee	Henry S. Johnston	Omer K. Benedict
Party	Democratic	Republican
Popular vote	213,167	170,714
Percentage	55.04%	44.08%
- County results Johnston: 40–50% 50–60% 60–70% 70–80% 80–90% Benedict: 40–50% 50–60% 60–70%
Governor before election
Martin E. Trapp
Democratic
Elected Governor
Henry S. Johnston
Democratic

The 1926 Oklahoma gubernatorial election was held on November 2, 1926, and was a race for Governor of Oklahoma. Democrat Henry S. Johnston defeated Republican Omer K. Benedict. Also on the ballot were John Franing of the Farmer–Labor Party, E. H. H. Gates of the Socialist Party, and Independent Ed Boyle.

== Primary election ==
=== Democratic party ===
Ten candidates vied for the Democratic nomination, including former governor James B. A. Robertson and Oklahoma City Mayor O. A. Cargill. Henry S. Johnston, who had been in the Oklahoma Senate since statehood including a term as the first President pro tempore, won the primary with a plurality.

==== Candidates ====
- J. A. Anderson
- O. A. Cargill, mayor of Oklahoma City
- John R. Clarke
- W. M. Darnell
- Frank P. Davis
- William M. Franklin
- Henry S. Johnston, former President pro tempore of the Oklahoma Senate
- Porter N. McCallum
- J. B. A. Robertson, former governor of Oklahoma
- T. H. Wren

==== Results ====
Democratic primary results
Party	Candidate	Votes	%
Democratic	Henry S. Johnston	87,840	36.97%
Democratic	W. M. Darnell	73,922	31.11%
Democratic	O. A. Cargill	45,993	19.36%
Democratic	J. B. A. Robertson	13,560	5.71%
Democratic	William M. Franklin	4,695	1.98%
Democratic	Frank P. Davis	3,194	1.34%
Democratic	T. H. Wren	3,194	1.34%
Democratic	John R. Clarke	2,230	0.94%
Democratic	J. A. Anderson	1,721	0.72%
Democratic	Porter N. McCallum	1,231	0.52%
Total votes		237,580	100.00%

=== Republican party ===
Eight candidates sought the Republican nomination, with Omer K. Benedict winning with less than one-third of the total vote.

==== Candidates ====
- Omer K. Benedict
- Henry L. Cloud
- Edward D. Evans
- Jim Harris
- George Healy
- James Hepburn
- John G. Lieber
- William Otjen, state senator

==== Results ====
Republican primary results
Party	Candidate	Votes	%
Republican	Omer K. Benedict	22,680	32.94%
Republican	William Otjen	18,334	26.63%
Republican	Jim Harris	12,530	18.20%
Republican	James Hepburn	7,361	10.69%
Republican	Henry L. Cloud	3,679	5.34%
Republican	Edward D. Evans	1,757	2.55%
Republican	George Healy	1,409	2.05%
Republican	John G. Lieber	1,109	1.61%
Total votes		68,859	100.00%

=== Socialist party ===
==== Candidates ====
- E. H. H. Gates

==== Results ====
Socialist primary results
Party	Candidate	Votes	%
Socialist	E. H. H. Gates	132	100.00%
Total votes		132	100.00%

=== Farmer-Labor party ===
==== Candidates ====
- John Franing

==== Results ====
Farmer-Labor primary results
Party	Candidate	Votes	%
Farmer–Labor	John Franing	49	100.00%
Total votes		49	100.00%

== General election ==
=== Results ===
1926 Oklahoma gubernatorial election
Party	Candidate	Votes	%	±%
Democratic	Henry S. Johnston	213,167	55.03%	+0.59%
Republican	Omer K. Benedict	170,714	44.08%	−0.71%
Farmer–Labor	John Franing	1,646	0.42%	
Socialist	E. H. H. Gates	1,350	0.35%	−0.42%
Independent	Ed Boyle	431	0.11%	
Total votes		387,308	100.00%	
Majority		42,453	10.96%	
Democratic hold		Swing	+1.30%	

=== Results by county ===
County	Henry S. Johnston Democratic		Omer K. Benedict Republican		John Franing Farmer-Labor		E. H. H. Gates Socialist		Ed Boyle Independent		Margin		Total votes cast
County	#	%	#	%	#	%	#	%	#	%	#	%	Total votes cast
Adair	1,796	48.15%	1,926	51.64%	3	0.08%	5	0.13%	0	0.00%	-130	-3.49%	3,730
Alfalfa	1,824	47.14%	2,007	51.87%	20	0.52%	15	0.39%	3	0.08%	-183	-4.73%	3,869
Atoka	1,700	59.94%	1,099	38.75%	29	1.02%	7	0.25%	1	0.04%	601	21.19%	2,836
Beaver	1,134	48.98%	1,137	49.11%	19	0.82%	24	1.04%	1	0.04%	-3	-0.13%	2,315
Beckham	1,929	70.50%	764	27.92%	25	0.91%	16	0.58%	2	0.07%	1,165	42.58%	2,736
Blaine	1,639	45.16%	1,935	53.32%	31	0.85%	19	0.52%	5	0.14%	-296	-8.16%	3,629
Bryan	3,440	71.73%	1,328	27.69%	13	0.27%	14	0.29%	1	0.02%	2,112	44.04%	4,796
Caddo	3,985	48.20%	4,202	50.82%	50	0.60%	27	0.33%	4	0.05%	-217	-2.62%	8,268
Canadian	2,502	51.64%	2,233	46.09%	82	1.69%	25	0.52%	3	0.06%	269	5.55%	4,845
Carter	5,543	69.35%	2,392	29.93%	18	0.23%	32	0.40%	8	0.10%	3,151	39.42%	7,993
Cherokee	2,311	53.79%	1,972	45.90%	2	0.05%	9	0.21%	2	0.05%	339	7.89%	4,296
Choctaw	2,382	61.22%	1,480	38.04%	12	0.31%	16	0.41%	1	0.03%	902	23.18%	3,891
Cimarron	589	53.40%	483	43.79%	12	1.09%	17	1.54%	2	0.18%	106	9.61%	1,103
Cleveland	2,459	62.40%	1,337	33.93%	111	2.82%	18	0.46%	16	0.41%	1,122	28.47%	3,941
Coal	1,771	66.68%	854	32.15%	11	0.41%	14	0.53%	6	0.23%	917	34.53%	2,656
Comanche	3,365	52.59%	2,989	46.72%	18	0.28%	20	0.31%	6	0.09%	376	5.88%	6,398
Cotton	1,588	55.74%	1,244	43.66%	8	0.28%	8	0.28%	1	0.04%	344	12.07%	2,849
Craig	2,587	52.66%	2,300	46.81%	11	0.22%	11	0.22%	4	0.08%	287	5.84%	4,913
Creek	6,292	49.98%	6,230	49.48%	31	0.25%	32	0.25%	5	0.04%	62	0.49%	12,590
Custer	2,435	55.78%	1,872	42.89%	29	0.66%	25	0.57%	4	0.09%	563	12.90%	4,365
Delaware	1,338	47.16%	1,404	49.49%	19	0.67%	52	1.83%	24	0.85%	-66	-2.33%	2,837
Dewey	1,331	51.57%	1,168	45.25%	41	1.59%	35	1.36%	6	0.23%	163	6.32%	2,581
Ellis	1,017	43.74%	1,282	55.14%	11	0.47%	12	0.52%	3	0.13%	-265	-11.40%	2,325
Garfield	4,356	45.87%	5,092	53.62%	29	0.31%	19	0.20%	1	0.01%	-736	-7.75%	9,497
Garvin	3,244	74.27%	1,095	25.07%	16	0.37%	10	0.23%	3	0.07%	2,149	49.20%	4,368
Grady	3,861	62.94%	2,136	34.82%	119	1.94%	10	0.16%	8	0.13%	1,725	28.12%	6,134
Grant	1,857	49.31%	1,883	50.00%	9	0.24%	15	0.40%	2	0.05%	-26	-0.69%	3,766
Greer	1,423	72.34%	540	27.45%	3	0.15%	1	0.05%	0	0.00%	883	44.89%	1,967
Harmon	821	82.60%	164	16.50%	7	0.70%	2	0.20%	0	0.00%	657	66.10%	994
Harper	906	47.53%	979	51.36%	13	0.68%	7	0.37%	1	0.05%	-73	-3.83%	1,906
Haskell	2,526	52.11%	2,312	47.70%	5	0.10%	1	0.02%	3	0.06%	214	4.42%	4,847
Hughes	2,846	62.34%	1,703	37.31%	3	0.07%	11	0.24%	2	0.04%	1,143	25.04%	4,565
Jackson	2,114	78.27%	558	20.66%	16	0.59%	13	0.48%	0	0.00%	1,556	57.61%	2,701
Jefferson	2,136	67.57%	1,003	31.73%	10	0.32%	9	0.28%	3	0.09%	1,133	35.84%	3,161
Johnston	1,526	61.68%	929	37.55%	9	0.36%	10	0.40%	0	0.00%	597	24.13%	2,474
Kay	5,213	50.44%	5,076	49.11%	11	0.11%	33	0.32%	3	0.03%	137	1.33%	10,336
Kingfisher	1,471	35.54%	2,631	63.57%	16	0.39%	4	0.10%	17	0.41%	-1,160	-28.03%	4,139
Kiowa	1,857	62.80%	1,052	35.58%	31	1.05%	14	0.47%	3	0.10%	805	27.22%	2,957
Latimer	1,159	50.88%	1,103	48.42%	8	0.35%	3	0.13%	5	0.22%	56	2.46%	2,278
Le Flore	3,500	54.70%	2,845	44.46%	22	0.34%	19	0.30%	13	0.20%	655	10.24%	6,399
Lincoln	2,888	45.73%	3,353	53.10%	43	0.68%	23	0.36%	8	0.13%	-465	-7.36%	6,315
Logan	2,442	45.87%	2,838	53.31%	19	0.36%	23	0.43%	2	0.04%	-396	-7.44%	5,324
Love	1,018	69.11%	440	29.87%	12	0.81%	3	0.20%	0	0.00%	578	39.24%	1,473
Major	1,053	44.56%	1,260	53.32%	11	0.47%	34	1.44%	5	0.21%	-207	-8.76%	2,363
Marshall	1,298	61.26%	778	36.72%	17	0.80%	25	1.18%	1	0.05%	520	24.54%	2,119
Mayes	1,824	48.10%	1,941	51.19%	12	0.32%	13	0.34%	2	0.05%	-117	-3.09%	3,792
McClain	1,980	68.87%	869	30.23%	19	0.66%	5	0.17%	2	0.07%	1,111	38.64%	2,875
McCurtain	2,637	71.46%	1,011	27.40%	22	0.60%	14	0.38%	6	0.16%	1,626	44.07%	3,690
McIntosh	1,582	55.24%	1,274	44.48%	6	0.21%	2	0.07%	0	0.00%	308	10.75%	2,864
Murray	1,419	61.51%	868	37.62%	10	0.43%	9	0.39%	1	0.04%	551	23.88%	2,307
Muskogee	5,644	51.55%	5,280	48.23%	12	0.11%	10	0.09%	2	0.02%	364	3.32%	10,948
Noble	2,611	54.38%	2,164	45.07%	9	0.19%	16	0.33%	1	0.02%	447	9.31%	4,801
Nowata	1,588	49.70%	1,578	49.39%	13	0.41%	12	0.38%	4	0.13%	10	0.31%	3,195
Okfuskee	2,517	57.57%	1,748	39.98%	5	0.11%	17	0.39%	85	1.94%	769	17.59%	4,372
Oklahoma	17,796	58.26%	12,549	41.08%	118	0.39%	63	0.21%	22	0.07%	5,247	17.18%	30,548
Okmulgee	4,797	50.11%	4,714	49.24%	12	0.13%	33	0.34%	17	0.18%	83	0.87%	9,573
Osage	4,434	49.47%	4,475	49.93%	20	0.22%	27	0.30%	7	0.08%	-41	-0.46%	8,963
Ottawa	4,231	53.96%	3,553	45.31%	7	0.09%	42	0.54%	8	0.10%	678	8.65%	7,841
Pawnee	2,260	45.63%	2,650	53.50%	13	0.26%	27	0.55%	3	0.06%	-390	-7.87%	4,953
Payne	3,646	53.54%	3,098	45.49%	39	0.57%	20	0.29%	7	0.10%	548	8.05%	6,810
Pittsburg	5,269	62.21%	3,125	36.89%	31	0.37%	28	0.33%	17	0.20%	2,144	25.31%	8,470
Pontotoc	3,168	62.75%	1,842	36.48%	23	0.46%	12	0.24%	4	0.08%	1,326	26.26%	5,049
Pottawatomie	4,888	65.00%	2,577	34.27%	33	0.44%	17	0.23%	5	0.07%	2,311	30.73%	7,520
Pushmataha	1,494	59.36%	998	39.65%	12	0.48%	10	0.40%	3	0.12%	496	19.71%	2,517
Roger Mills	1,232	60.24%	743	36.33%	20	0.98%	40	1.96%	10	0.49%	489	23.91%	2,045
Rogers	2,186	53.32%	1,870	45.61%	25	0.61%	15	0.37%	4	0.10%	316	7.71%	4,100
Seminole	2,446	60.89%	1,535	38.21%	22	0.55%	13	0.32%	1	0.02%	911	22.68%	4,017
Sequoyah	2,714	57.16%	2,022	42.59%	2	0.04%	9	0.19%	1	0.02%	692	14.57%	4,748
Stephens	3,186	70.28%	1,301	28.70%	19	0.42%	25	0.55%	2	0.04%	1,885	41.58%	4,533
Texas	1,583	54.81%	1,269	43.94%	16	0.55%	16	0.55%	4	0.14%	314	10.87%	2,888
Tillman	1,903	78.28%	518	21.31%	6	0.25%	3	0.12%	1	0.04%	1,385	56.97%	2,431
Tulsa	10,095	41.54%	14,160	58.27%	16	0.07%	26	0.11%	4	0.02%	-4,065	-16.73%	24,301
Wagoner	1,791	53.85%	1,522	45.76%	5	0.15%	3	0.09%	5	0.15%	269	8.09%	3,326
Washington	2,755	49.67%	2,770	49.94%	9	0.16%	10	0.18%	3	0.05%	-15	-0.27%	5,547
Washita	1,561	65.86%	774	32.66%	17	0.72%	16	0.68%	2	0.08%	787	33.21%	2,370
Woods	1,847	48.24%	1,930	50.40%	20	0.52%	32	0.84%	0	0.00%	-83	-2.17%	3,829
Woodward	1,611	49.72%	1,578	48.70%	18	0.56%	23	0.71%	10	0.31%	33	1.02%	3,240
Totals	213,167	55.04%	170,714 (Note: The county figures add up to 171,714)	44.08%	1,646	0.42%	1,350	0.35%	431	0.11%	42,453	10.96%	387,308

==== Counties that flipped from Republican to Democratic ====
- Canadian
- Cimarron
- Creek
- Custer
- Kay
- Noble
- Oklahoma
- Okmulgee
- Payne
- Texas
- Woodward

==== Counties that flipped from Democratic to Republican ====
- Adair
- Caddo
- Delaware
- Mayes
