= R. H. Wilson =

American politician (1873–1937)

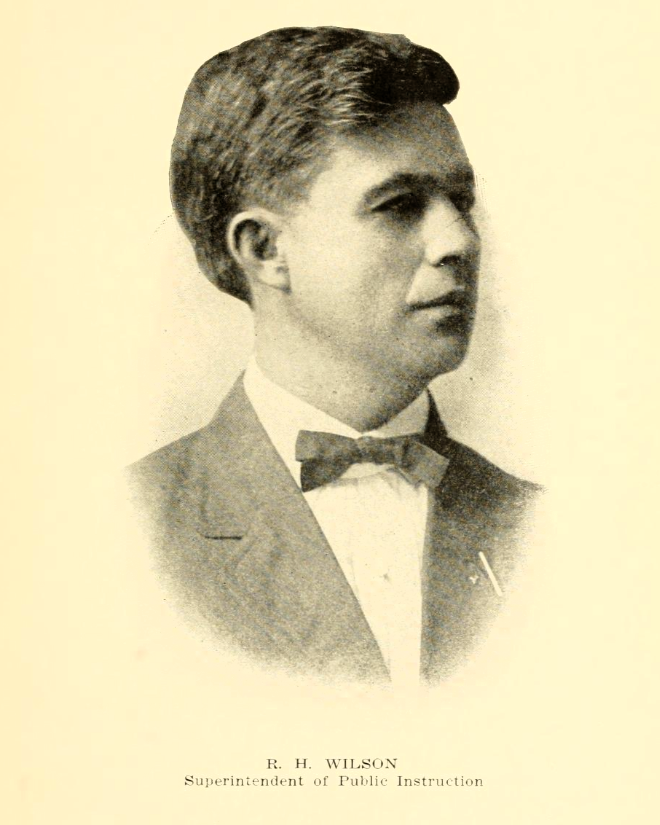

2nd Oklahoma Superintendent of Public Instruction
- In office November 16, 1911 – 1923
- Governor: Lee Cruce; Robert L. Williams; James B. A. Robertson
- Preceded by: Evan Dhu Cameron
- Succeeded by: M. A. Nash

Personal details
- Born: Robert H. Wilson; August 25, 1873
- Died: October 4, 1937 (aged 64)
- Party: Democratic Party

Robert H. Wilson was an American politician who served as the 2nd Oklahoma Superintendent of Public Instruction from 1911 to 1923 and unsuccessfully ran for governor of Oklahoma in 1922.

== Early life, family, and career ==
Robert H. Wilson was born in Allen County, Kentucky on August 25, 1873, to John A. Wilson and Mary E. Briley. He left Kentucky in 1891, moving to Texas and attending Grayson College in Whitewright. On September 17, 1899, he married Grace Womack and they had two children. In 1903 he moved to Chickasha, Indian Territory (now Grady County, Oklahoma). He was later elected the principal of a Chickasha grade school and taught 12 years in . He was the first president of the Oklahoma School Officers' Association.

== Oklahoma Superintendent ==
At Oklahoma statehood Wilson was elected County Superintendent of Grady County, Oklahoma. He held the office until he defeated Evan Dhu Cameron in the 1910 Democratic primary for Oklahoma Superintendent of Public Instruction and won the general election. He was reelected in 1914 and 1918.

== 1922 Gubernatorial campaign ==
Wilson ran in the 1922 Oklahoma gubernatorial election with the endorsement of the Ku Klux Klan, but lost the primary to Jack C. Walton.

== Later life and death ==
He died in Oklahoma City, Oklahoma on October 4, 1937.

== Electoral history ==
Oklahoma State Superintendent Democratic primary (August 2, 1910)
Party	Candidate	Votes	%
Democratic	R. H. Wilson	62,337	56.7%
Democratic	Evan Dhu Cameron (incumbent)	47,433	43.3%
Turnout		108.770	

1910 Oklahoma State Superintendent election
Party	Candidate	Votes	%	±%
Democratic	R. H. Wilson	118,628	50.3%	−4.5%
Republican	John P. Evans	93,549	39.6%	−1.5%
Socialist	S.S. Smith	23,642	10.0%	+6.1%
Democratic hold		Swing		

1922 Oklahoma gubernatorial Democratic primary results
Party	Candidate	Votes	%
Democratic	Jack C. Walton	119,248	44.2
Democratic	R. H. Wilson	84,320	31.2
Democratic	Thomas H. Owen	63,915	23.7
Democratic	Arthur Finn	1,206	0.4
Democratic	Frank Ziska	849	0.3
Total votes		269,538	100.00

Party political offices
Preceded by Evan Dhu Cameron	Democratic nominee for Oklahoma Superintendent of Public Instruction; 1910, 1914, 1918	Succeeded by M. A. Nash
