= D. A. McDougal =

American politician

Member of the Oklahoma House of Representatives from the Creek County, Office 3 district
- In office 1930–1932
- Preceded by: Grady Lewis
- Succeeded by: J. A. Watson

Personal details
- Born: 1865 Wayland Springs, Tennessee, U.S.
- Died: January 5, 1955 Coral Gables, Florida, U.S.
- Party: Democratic Party
- Education: Vanderbilt University

Daniel Archibald McDougal was an American politician who served in the Oklahoma House of Representatives from 1930 to 1932.

== Biography ==
Daniel Archibald McDougal was born in 1865 in Wayland Springs, Tennessee, and graduated from Vanderbilt University. He moved to Creek County, Oklahoma, (then Indian Territory) in 1903. He was a Democratic Party presidential elector in 1908 for Oklahoma's 3rd congressional district. He was also a cousin of U.S. Senator Edward W. Carmack.

In 1910, he ran for the Oklahoma Court of Criminal Appeals eastern district, but lost the Democratic primary to James R. Armstrong.

In 1930, he ran for the Oklahoma House of Representatives and faced Lloyd L. Smith and William F. Cowper in the Democratic primary. He advanced to a runoff alongside Smith, which he won. He defeated Republican nominee Harve Matherly. He served from November 1930 to November 1932. He was preceded in office by Grady Lewis and succeeded in office by J. A. Watson.

McDougal also served as mayor of Sapulpa, Oklahoma, was an early operator of the Glenn Pool, worked for the U.S. Department of State from 1933 to 1942. He also owned the Chevalier Corp., an oil company. He died on January 5, 1955, in Coral Gables, Florida.

== Electoral history ==
1910 Oklahoma Court of Criminal Appeals Eastern District Democratic primary (August 2, 1910)
Party	Candidate	Votes	%
Democratic	James R. Armstrong	13,264	41.9%
Democratic	J. H. Linebaugh	12,086	38.2%
Democratic	D. A. McDougal	6,256	19.8%
Democratic	Woodson Norvell	39	0.001%
Turnout		31645	
