= 1922 Oklahoma gubernatorial election =

- November 7, 1922
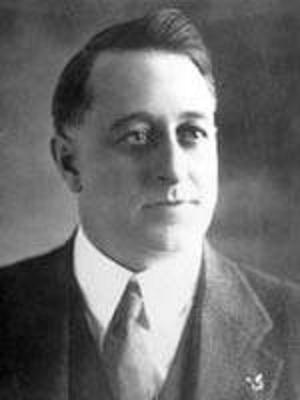

Nominee	Jack C. Walton	John Fields
Party	Democratic	Republican
Popular vote	280,206	230,469
Percentage	54.45%	44.78%
- County results Walton: 40–50% 50–60% 60–70% 70–80% 80–90% Fields: 40–50% 50–60% 60–70%
Governor before election
James B. A. Robertson
Democratic
Elected Governor
Jack C. Walton
Democratic

The 1922 Oklahoma gubernatorial election was held on November 7, 1922, and was a race for Governor of Oklahoma. Democrat Jack C. Walton defeated Republican John Fields. Also on the ballot was O. E. Enfield of the Socialist Party.

== Primary election ==
=== Democratic party ===
Oklahoma City Mayor Jack Walton came out ahead of four others to claim the Democratic nomination for Governor.

==== Candidates ====
- Arthur Finn
- Thomas H. Owen, justice of the Oklahoma Supreme Court
- J. C. Walton, mayor of Oklahoma City
- R. H. Wilson, Oklahoma Superintendent of Public Instruction
- Frank Ziska

==== Results ====
Democratic primary results
Party	Candidate	Votes	%
Democratic	Jack Walton	119,248	44.24%
Democratic	R. H. Wilson	84,320	31.28%
Democratic	Thomas H. Owen	63,915	23.71%
Democratic	Arthur Finn	1,206	0.45%
Democratic	Frank Ziska	849	0.32%
Total votes		269,538	100.00%

=== Republican party ===
John Fields defeated George H. Healy to win the GOP nomination,

==== Candidates ====
- John Fields
- George H. Healy

==== Results ====
Republican primary results
Party	Candidate	Votes	%
Republican	John Fields	80,565	91.75%
Republican	George H. Healy	7,244	8.25%
Total votes		87,809	100.00%

=== Socialist party ===
==== Candidates ====
- O. E. Enfield

==== Results ====
Socialist primary results
Party	Candidate	Votes	%
Socialist	O. E. Enfield	1,186	100.00%
Total votes		1,186	100.00%

== General election ==
=== Results ===
1922 Oklahoma gubernatorial election
Party	Candidate	Votes	%	±%
Democratic	J. C. Walton	280,206	54.45%	+0.89%
Republican	John Fields	230,469	44.78%	+2.17%
Socialist	O. E. Enfield	3,941	0.77%	−3.06%
Total votes		514,616	100.00%	
Majority		49,737	9.66%	
Democratic hold		Swing	-1.27%	

=== Results by county ===
Fields was the first Republican to win Cimarron County, Osage County, and Texas County. Cimarron County would not vote Republican again until 1962 and would not fail to back the winning candidate again until 1978.

County	J. C. Walton Democratic		John Fields Republican		O. E. Enfield Socialist		Margin		Total votes cast
County	#	%	#	%	#	%	#	%	Total votes cast
Adair	2,470	56.15%	1,901	43.21%	28	0.64%	569	12.93%	4,399
Alfalfa	1,659	35.04%	3,025	63.90%	50	1.06%	-1,366	-28.86%	4,734
Atoka	3,623	63.97%	2,022	35.70%	19	0.34%	1,601	28.27%	5,664
Beaver	1,408	42.18%	1,885	56.47%	45	1.35%	-477	-14.29%	3,338
Beckham	3,109	64.08%	1,690	34.83%	53	1.09%	1,419	29.25%	4,852
Blaine	2,314	44.45%	2,807	53.92%	85	1.63%	-493	-9.47%	5,206
Bryan	6,545	80.67%	1,543	19.02%	25	0.31%	5,002	61.65%	8,113
Caddo	5,075	52.32%	4,496	46.35%	129	1.33%	579	5.97%	9,700
Canadian	3,680	49.42%	3,708	49.79%	59	0.79%	-28	-0.38%	7,447
Carter	6,449	65.25%	3,344	33.84%	90	0.91%	3,105	31.42%	9,883
Cherokee	3,089	55.03%	2,489	44.34%	35	0.62%	600	10.69%	5,613
Choctaw	3,928	71.16%	1,566	28.37%	26	0.47%	2,362	42.79%	5,520
Cimarron	738	49.30%	743	49.63%	16	1.07%	-5	-0.33%	1,497
Cleveland	3,200	58.83%	2,185	40.17%	54	0.99%	1,015	18.66%	5,439
Coal	2,793	67.46%	1,335	32.25%	12	0.29%	1,458	35.22%	4,140
Comanche	4,131	58.64%	2,853	40.50%	61	0.87%	1,278	18.14%	7,045
Cotton	2,665	64.67%	1,434	34.80%	22	0.53%	1,231	29.87%	4,121
Craig	3,048	55.55%	2,417	44.05%	22	0.40%	631	11.50%	5,487
Creek	6,989	46.08%	8,075	53.24%	102	0.67%	-1,086	-7.16%	15,166
Custer	3,006	48.46%	3,116	50.23%	81	1.31%	-110	-1.77%	6,203
Delaware	2,167	56.34%	1,657	43.08%	22	0.57%	510	13.26%	3,846
Dewey	1,786	50.00%	1,638	45.86%	148	4.14%	148	4.14%	3,572
Ellis	1,266	42.10%	1,637	54.44%	104	3.46%	-371	-12.34%	3,007
Garfield	5,324	41.93%	7,267	57.23%	107	0.84%	-1,943	-15.30%	12,698
Garvin	4,825	72.61%	1,768	26.61%	52	0.78%	3,057	46.00%	6,645
Grady	5,236	64.01%	2,891	35.34%	53	0.65%	2,345	28.68%	8,180
Grant	1,971	38.19%	3,161	61.25%	29	0.56%	-1,190	-23.06%	5,161
Greer	2,208	71.60%	862	27.95%	14	0.45%	1,346	43.64%	3,084
Harmon	1,578	74.86%	502	23.81%	28	1.33%	1,076	51.04%	2,108
Harper	1,199	49.63%	1,203	49.79%	14	0.58%	-4	-0.17%	2,416
Haskell	3,516	65.14%	1,869	34.62%	13	0.24%	1,647	30.51%	5,398
Hughes	4,067	65.49%	2,105	33.90%	38	0.61%	1,962	31.59%	6,210
Jackson	2,820	66.40%	1,371	32.28%	56	1.32%	1,449	34.12%	4,247
Jefferson	2,636	69.06%	1,139	29.84%	42	1.10%	1,497	39.22%	3,817
Johnston	3,617	77.85%	1,003	21.59%	26	0.56%	2,614	56.26%	4,646
Kay	4,582	43.76%	5,841	55.79%	47	0.45%	-1,259	-12.02%	10,470
Kingfisher	2,545	46.83%	2,864	52.70%	26	0.48%	-319	-5.87%	5,435
Kiowa	3,554	58.11%	2,477	40.50%	85	1.39%	1,077	17.61%	6,116
Latimer	2,245	63.40%	1,282	36.20%	14	0.40%	963	27.20%	3,541
Le Flore	5,820	63.36%	3,325	36.20%	41	0.45%	2,495	27.16%	9,186
Lincoln	3,812	46.81%	4,269	52.43%	62	0.76%	-457	-5.61%	8,143
Logan	3,099	38.03%	4,992	61.27%	57	0.70%	-1,893	-23.23%	8,148
Love	2,112	87.27%	301	12.44%	7	0.29%	1,811	74.83%	2,420
Major	1,181	38.26%	1,774	57.47%	132	4.28%	-593	-19.21%	3,087
Marshall	2,416	77.59%	664	21.32%	34	1.09%	1,752	56.26%	3,114
Mayes	2,764	55.73%	2,172	43.79%	24	0.48%	592	11.94%	4,960
McClain	2,623	67.10%	1,273	32.57%	13	0.33%	1,350	34.54%	3,909
McCurtain	3,483	76.48%	1,048	23.01%	23	0.51%	2,435	53.47%	4,554
McIntosh	2,969	66.01%	1,519	33.77%	10	0.22%	1,450	32.24%	4,498
Murray	2,220	70.14%	936	29.57%	9	0.28%	1,284	40.57%	3,165
Muskogee	7,471	56.85%	5,652	43.01%	18	0.14%	1,819	13.84%	13,141
Noble	1,950	43.18%	2,523	55.87%	43	0.95%	-573	-12.69%	4,516
Nowata	2,247	49.87%	2,240	49.71%	19	0.42%	7	0.16%	4,506
Okfuskee	3,020	66.01%	1,522	33.27%	33	0.72%	1,498	32.74%	4,575
Oklahoma	20,397	46.09%	23,701	53.56%	156	0.35%	-3,304	-7.47%	44,254
Okmulgee	5,579	45.77%	6,542	53.67%	68	0.56%	-963	-7.90%	12,189
Osage	4,427	47.39%	4,842	51.83%	73	0.78%	-415	-4.44%	9,342
Ottawa	4,179	50.20%	4,086	49.08%	60	0.72%	93	1.12%	8,325
Pawnee	2,481	43.64%	3,140	55.23%	64	1.13%	-659	-11.59%	5,685
Payne	4,368	44.58%	5,356	54.66%	75	0.77%	-988	-10.08%	9,799
Pittsburg	7,855	62.62%	4,639	36.98%	49	0.39%	3,216	25.64%	12,543
Pontotoc	4,692	63.76%	2,643	35.92%	24	0.33%	2,049	27.84%	7,359
Pottawatomie	6,558	54.54%	5,308	44.14%	159	1.32%	1,250	10.40%	12,025
Pushmataha	2,546	71.20%	1,005	28.10%	25	0.70%	1,541	43.09%	3,576
Roger Mills	1,542	57.52%	1,005	37.49%	134	5.00%	537	20.03%	2,681
Rogers	3,087	56.50%	2,330	42.64%	47	0.86%	757	13.85%	5,464
Seminole	3,352	58.15%	2,392	41.50%	20	0.35%	960	16.66%	5,764
Sequoyah	3,689	57.91%	2,652	41.63%	29	0.46%	1,037	16.28%	6,370
Stephens	4,456	62.17%	2,566	35.80%	145	2.02%	1,890	26.37%	7,167
Texas	1,884	48.53%	1,962	50.54%	36	0.93%	-78	-2.01%	3,882
Tillman	2,728	59.84%	1,804	39.57%	27	0.59%	924	20.27%	4,559
Tulsa	10,467	43.61%	13,481	56.16%	56	0.23%	-3,014	-12.56%	24,004
Wagoner	2,226	61.10%	1,370	37.61%	47	1.29%	856	23.50%	3,643
Washington	2,478	38.60%	3,929	61.21%	12	0.19%	-1,451	-22.60%	6,419
Washita	2,853	61.04%	1,754	37.53%	67	1.43%	1,099	23.51%	4,674
Woods	2,217	46.61%	2,469	51.90%	71	1.49%	-252	-5.30%	4,757
Woodward	1,897	46.85%	2,112	52.16%	40	0.99%	-215	-5.31%	4,049
Totals	280,206	54.45%	230,469	44.78%	3,941	0.77%	49,737	9.66%	514,616

==== Counties that flipped from Republican to Democratic ====
- Caddo
- Dewey
- Nowata

==== Counties that flipped from Democratic to Republican ====
- Canadian
- Cimarron
- Creek
- Oklahoma
- Okmulgee
- Osage
- Texas
- Tulsa
