= D. A. Shaw =

American judge (1875–1927)

Member of the Oklahoma Senate from the 21st district
- In office 1926 – January 2, 1927
- Preceded by: L. P. Bobo
- Succeeded by: J. B. Harper

Personal details
- Born: December 31, 1875 Waldron, Arkansas, U.S.
- Died: January 2, 1927 (aged 51)
- Party: Democratic

D. A. Shaw (December 31, 1875 – January 2, 1927) was an American politician who served in the Oklahoma Senate from 1926 until his death in 1927.

== Biography ==
D. A. Shaw was born in Waldron, Arkansas on December 31, 1875. He moved to Texas in 1895 and read the law. He moved to Oklahoma in 1907. From 1914 to 1919 he was editor for the LeFlore County Sun. He was elected county judge for LeFlore County in 1917 and served until 1920. In 1925 he was elected mayor of Poteau and in 1926 he was elected to the Oklahoma Senate. He died on January 2, 1927. He was a member of the Democratic Party and succeeded in office by J. B. Harper.
