= Erskine Snoddy =

Member of the Oklahoma House of Representatives from the Woods County district
- In office November 1926 – November 1932
- Preceded by: Marion Clothier
- Succeeded by: Chas. Albright

Personal details
- Born: 1876 or 1877 Sedalia, Missouri, U. S.
- Died: March 11, 1939 Alva, Oklahoma, U. S.
- Party: Republican

Erskine W. Snoddy was an American politician who served in the Oklahoma House of Representatives from 1926 to 1932. He was a Republican and represented Woods County.

== Biography ==
Erskine W. Snoddy was born in Sedalia, Missouri, in 1876 or 1877. He later moved to Oklahoma with his father W. W. S. Snoddy and a brother, Claude Snoddy, during the opening of the Cherokee Strip. He worked as a United States Deputy Marshal, as a Woods County attorney, and as a criminal defense attorney.

In 1910, he was the Republican nominee for the 1910 Oklahoma Court of Criminal Appeals Northern District election, losing the general election to Democratic nominee Thomas H. Doyle.

In 1926, he ran in the Republican primary for the Oklahoma House of Representatives' Woods County district. He defeated Ed S. Roberts and Arthur W. Wetz for the party's nomination, before facing Democrat L. A. Clinkenbeard in the general election. He represented Woods County in the Oklahoma House from 1926 to 1932 as a member of the Republican Party. He was preceded in office by Republican Marion Clothier and succeeded in office by Democrat Chas. Albright.

He died on March 11, 1949, in Alva, Oklahoma of a heart attack.

== Electoral history ==
1910 Oklahoma Court of Criminal Appeals Northern District Republican primary (August 2, 1910)
Party	Candidate	Votes	%
Republican	Erskine Snoddy	21,183	100%

1910 Oklahoma Court of Criminal Appeals Northern District election
Party	Candidate	Votes	%
Democratic	Thomas H. Doyle (incumbent)	117,933	55.7%
Republican	Erskine Snoddy	93,468	44.2%
Democratic hold			
