= Thomas Charles Wyatt =

American physician, farmer and politician

Member of the Oklahoma Board of Arbitration and Conciliation
- In office 1907–1920
- Appointed by: Charles N. Haskell; Lee Cruce; Robert L. Williams

Member of the Tennessee Senate
- In office 1893–1895

Member of the Tennessee House of Representatives
- In office 1891–1893

Personal details
- Born: June 10, 1850 Humphreys County, Tennessee, United States
- Died: September 27, 1922 (aged 72) Shawnee, Oklahoma, United States
- Party: Democratic Party

Thomas Charles Wyatt (June 10, 1850 – September 27, 1922) was an American physician, farmer and politician who served in the Tennessee House of Representatives and Tennessee Senate. He later moved to Oklahoma Territory and was a member of the state's constitutional convention.

== Biography ==
Thomas Charles Wyatt was born on June 10, 1850, in Humphreys County, Tennessee, to William Carroll Wyatt and Harriet O'Guin Wyatt. He attended the local primary and secondary schools and then worked as a country storekeeper from 1870 to 1872. Wyatt next went to Springville, Tennessee, where he was the railroad station agent for two years. On October 24, 1876, he married Ida Beach and the couple had eight children.

Wyatt went to Nashville, Tennessee to study medicine, graduating in 1878. Sources differ on whether his medical degree was granted by the University of Nashville, Vanderbilt University or the University of Tennessee. He returned to Humphreys County, where he practiced medicine for five years before abandoning his practice to become a farmer.

A member of the Democratic Party, Wyatt was elected to the Tennessee House of Representatives in 1890 and then the Tennessee Senate in 1892. In 1900, he moved to Pottawatomie County in the Oklahoma Territory and in 1906 he was elected to represent the 33rd district at the Oklahoma Constitutional Convention. He was appointed to the Oklahoma Board of Arbitration and Conciliation by Governors Charles N. Haskell, Lee Cruce, and Robert L. Williams. He suffered a paralytic stroke on June 19, 1920.

Wyatt died on September 27, 1922 at Shawnee, Oklahoma. He was interred at Fairview Cemetery in Shawnee.
