= David Hogg (Oklahoma politician) =

Member of the Oklahoma Territorial Legislature from the 25th district
- In office 1905 – November 16, 1907
- Preceded by: W. P. Francis
- Succeeded by: Position disestablished

Personal details
- Born: March 4, 1850 Letcher County, Kentucky, United States
- Died: November 13, 1918 (aged 68)

David Hogg (March 4, 1850 – November 13, 1918) was an American politician who served in the Oklahoma Territory Legislature.

== Biography ==
David Hogg was born on March 4, 1850, to Silas and Louisa Hogg in Letcher County, Kentucky. In 1891, he moved to Greer County, Texas, and served as a justice of the peace and county commissioner. He later moved to Oklahoma Territory in 1904 and was elected to the Oklahoma Territorial Legislature. He was later elected to the Oklahoma Constitutional Convention. He died on November 13, 1918.
