= Amos Holland Culp =

American politician (1860–1927)

Member of the Oklahoma Senate from the 32nd district
- In office 1924–1926
- Preceded by: Glen R. Horner
- Succeeded by: T. T. Blakely

Member of the Oklahoma House of Representatives from the Okmulgee County district
- In office 1922–1924
- Preceded by: Clarence L. Tylee
- Succeeded by: S. M. Hufstedler

Personal details
- Born: October 23, 1860 Parkersburg, Virginia (now West Virginia), U. S.
- Died: March 29, 1927 (aged 66)

Amos Holland Culp (October 23, 1860 – March 29, 1927) was an American physician and politician who served in the Oklahoma House of Representatives from 1922 to 1924 and in the Oklahoma Senate from 1924 until his death.

== Early life and career ==
Amos Holland Culp was born on October 23, 1860, in Parkersburg, West Virginia. He graduated from University of Louisville School of Medicine and married Lillie Warren on November 7, 1889. In 1901 he moved to Beggs, Indian Territory, to serve as the government doctor for the Nuyaka Mission. He also worked for the St. Louis–San Francisco Railway as a surgeon.

== Oklahoma Legislature ==
In 1922, Culp was elected to the Oklahoma House of Representatives to represent the Okmulgee County district. A member of the Democratic Party, he was preceded in office by Clarence L. Tylee and succeeded by S. M. Hufstedler. He was elected to represent the Oklahoma Senate's 32nd district in 1924, succeeding Glen R. Horner. During his tenure he wrote legislation intended to help "crippled children." On March 29, 1927, he died in office. He was succeeded in office by T. T. Blakely.
