= Joseph L. Paschal =

American politician (1863–1931)

Member of the Oklahoma House of Representatives from the Roger Mills County district
- In office November 16, 1907 – November 16, 1910
- Preceded by: Position established
- Succeeded by: Perry Madden

Member of the Nebraska Senate from the 12th district
- In office 1901–1903
- Preceded by: James A. Dunn
- Succeeded by: Warren A. Way

Personal details
- Born: July 30, 1863 Columbus City, Iowa, U.S.
- Died: October 30, 1931 (aged 68) Oklahoma City, Oklahoma, U.S.
- Party: Democratic Party

Joseph L. Paschal was an American politician who served in the Nebraska Senate from 1901 to 1903 and the Oklahoma House of Representatives from 1907 to 1910.

== Biography ==
Joseph L. Paschal was born on July 30, 1863, in Columbus City, Iowa. In 1890, he moved to Platte County, Nebraska where he worked for The Argus newspaper. He became editor of the Columbus Telegram in 1898.

Paschal served in the Nebraska Senate from 1901 to 1903 representing Columbus, Nebraska.

Paschal served in the Oklahoma House of Representatives during the 1st Oklahoma Legislature and 2nd Oklahoma Legislature as a member of the Democratic Party representing Roger Mills County. He was succeeded in office by Democrat Perry Madden.

In 1910, Paschal campaigned for the Democratic Party's nomination for President of the Oklahoma State Board of Agriculture, but lost the primary to G. T. Bryan.

He died on October 30, 1931, in Oklahoma City.

== Electoral history ==
1910 Oklahoma President of State Board of Agriculture Democratic primary (August 2, 1910)
Party	Candidate	Votes	%
Democratic	G. T. Bryan	55,712	58.9%
Democratic	George L. Bishop	22,805	24.1%
Democratic	Joseph L. Paschal	15,940	16.8%
Turnout		94,457	
