= Giles W. Farris =

American politician (1874–1947)

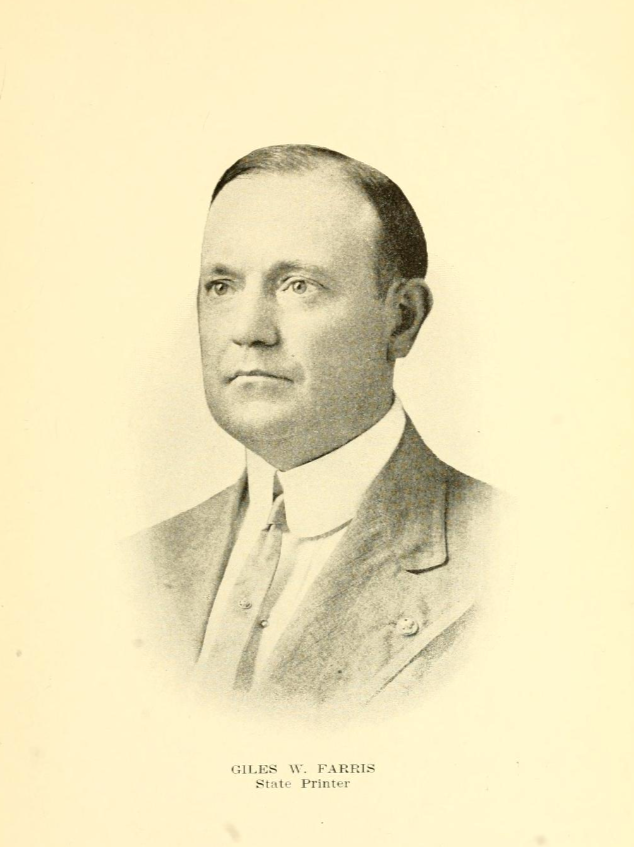
- 1912 sketch of Farris

Oklahoma State Board of Equalizers
- In office January 15, 1947 – April 9, 1947
- Appointed by: A. S. J. Shaw

Oklahoma State Printer
- In office January 1911 – February 26, 1913
- Governor: Lee Cruce
- Preceded by: Position established
- Succeeded by: W. M. Erwin

Personal details
- Born: 1874 Greene County, Missouri, US
- Died: April 9, 1947 (aged 72–73) Oklahoma City, Oklahoma, US
- Party: Democratic Party

Giles W. Farris (1874 – April 9, 1947) was an American politician who was the only elected Oklahoma State Printer from January 1911 until his impeachment from office in February 1913. After his tenure, the office of State Printer was abolished by the Oklahoma Legislature, with the office officially ceasing to exist June 15, 1913.

== Early life ==
Farris was born in 1874, in Greene County, Missouri. At age 11, he entered the newspaper industry. Around 1902, he moved to Oklahoma Territory and worked for the Magnum Star, which he took over in 1904.

== State Printer ==
He was elected Oklahoma State Printer in 1910. On December 27, 1912, Farris was arrested on the order of Attorney General Charles West and Oklahoma Examiner and Inspector Fred Parkinson for forging a name to receive $500 in state funds. The charge was dismissed later the next month, and West forward the indictment to the Oklahoma House of Representatives recommending impeachment. On January 27, 1913, the Oklahoma House voted to impeach Farris 89:1 and State Auditor Leo Meyer 84:6. The Oklahoma Senate voted to remove him from office on February 26, in the state's first impeachment trial. The Oklahoma Legislature subsequently passed a bill to abolish the state printer's office, but not until June 15; W. M. Erwin was appointed to serve in the position until its abolition.

== Later life and death ==
State Auditor A. S. J. Shaw appointed Farris to the Oklahoma State Board of Equalization January 15, 1947. He died on April 9, 1947, aged 72 or 73, in Oklahoma City.

== Electoral history ==
1910 Oklahoma State Printer Democratic primary (August 2, 1910)
Party	Candidate	Votes	%
Democratic	Giles W. Farris	39,324	41.6%
Democratic	D. C. Lester	33,704	35.7%
Democratic	J. T. Highley	21,316	22.5%
Turnout		94,344	

1910 Oklahoma State Printer election
Party	Candidate	Votes	%	±%
Democratic	Giles W. Farris	117,239	50.0%	
Republican	Samuel L. Bartholomew	93,215	39.8%	
Socialist	Jacob J. Truinett	23,717	10.1%	
Democratic gain from				
