= Swamp Campbell =

American attorney and politician

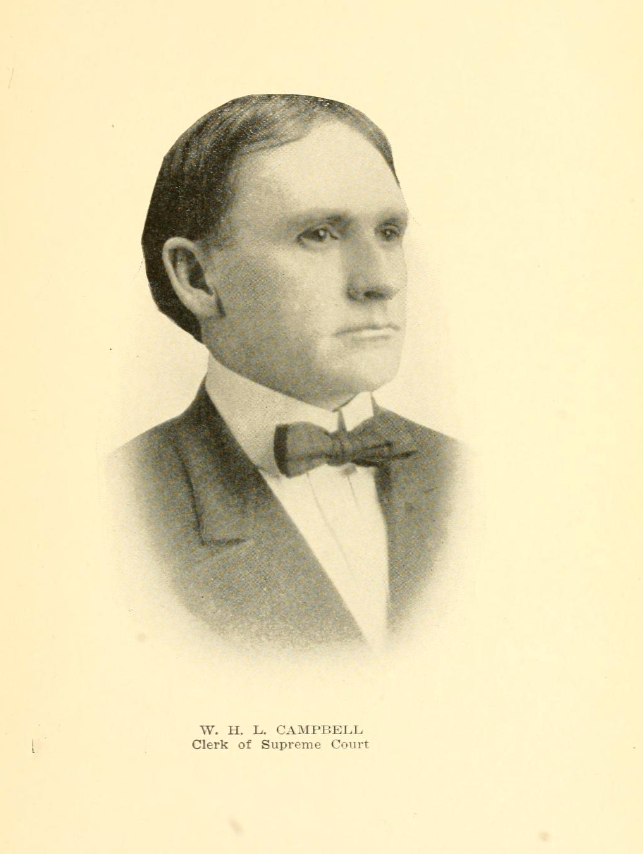

1st Clerk of the Oklahoma Supreme Court
- In office November 16, 1907 – November 12, 1914
- Governor: Charles N. Haskell; Lee Cruce
- Preceded by: Position established
- Succeeded by: William M. Franklin

County attorney for Rockwall County, Texas
- In office 1902 – May 1905

Personal details
- Born: William Henry Lee Campbell; November 1867 Snow Creek, North Carolina
- Died: November 12, 1914 (aged 46–47) Tulsa, Oklahoma
- Party: Democratic Party

William Henry Lee "Swamp" Campbell (November 1867 – November 12, 1914) was an American attorney and politician who served as the first elected Clerk of the Oklahoma Supreme Court from 1907 to 1914.

== Biography ==
Campbell was born in 1867 in Snow Creek, Stokes County, North Carolina. He attended school in North Carolina before moving to Texas in 1890. He began practicing law in 1901 in Rockwall, Texas. He was the elected county attorney in Rockwall County, Texas from 1902 to May 1905 when he moved to Indian Territory. He lived in Ryan, Oklahoma and worked as the city attorney for Ada, Oklahoma.

In 1907, he was elected as the first Clerk of the Supreme Court of Oklahoma. Following the primary for this election, the Oklahoma Democratic Party headquarters had run out of money. Campbell—who was affectionately known as "Swamp"—was not a wealthy man, but took out a loan for $500 (equivalent to $17,000 in 2025) from Ada banks and "turned every cent of this money into the hungry coffers of democracy."

Campbell was re-elected in 1910. In 1914, he lost re-election in the Democratic Party's primary to William M. Franklin.

== Personal life ==
In September 1910, he married Willie Bryan Sherwood in Oklahoma City.

He died in 1914 after collapsing at the Brady Hotel in Tulsa, where he had been staying while in town. He was said to be suffering from "paresis caused by nervous strain" and quickly declined, "some of the most prominent persons in Oklahoma at his bedside, many of his intimate friends having arrived from Oklahoma City and elsewhere throughout the state."

He was noted for his love of the natural beauty of Oklahoma and its Native residents, and eulogized as an "ardent, lovable, generous spirit of a big hearted fellow whom it was good to know."

== Electoral history ==
1907 Oklahoma Clerk of the Supreme Court of Oklahoma election
Party	Candidate	Votes	%	±%
Democratic	Swamp Campbell	132,597	55.0	New
Republican	J.W. Speake	99,227	41.1	New
Socialist	J.V. Kolachny	9,049	3.7	New
Democratic gain from		Swing	N/A	

1910 Oklahoma Clerk of the Supreme Court Democratic primary (August 2, 1910)
Party	Candidate	Votes	%
Democratic	Swamp Campbell	39,921	39.8%
Democratic	L. K. Taylor	25,624	26.2%
Democratic	Neil B. Gardner	19,030	19.5%
Democratic	N. A. Gordon	14,006	14.3%
Turnout		97,581	

1910 Oklahoma Clerk of the Supreme Court election
Party	Candidate	Votes	%	±%
Democratic	Swamp Campbell (incumbent)	117,571	50.0%	−5.0%
Republican	Chas. C. Chapell	93,645	39.8%	−1.3%
Socialist	H.M. Sinclair	23,721	10.0%	+6.3%
Democratic hold		Swing		
