= Evan Dhu Cameron =

American politician and educator (1862–1923)

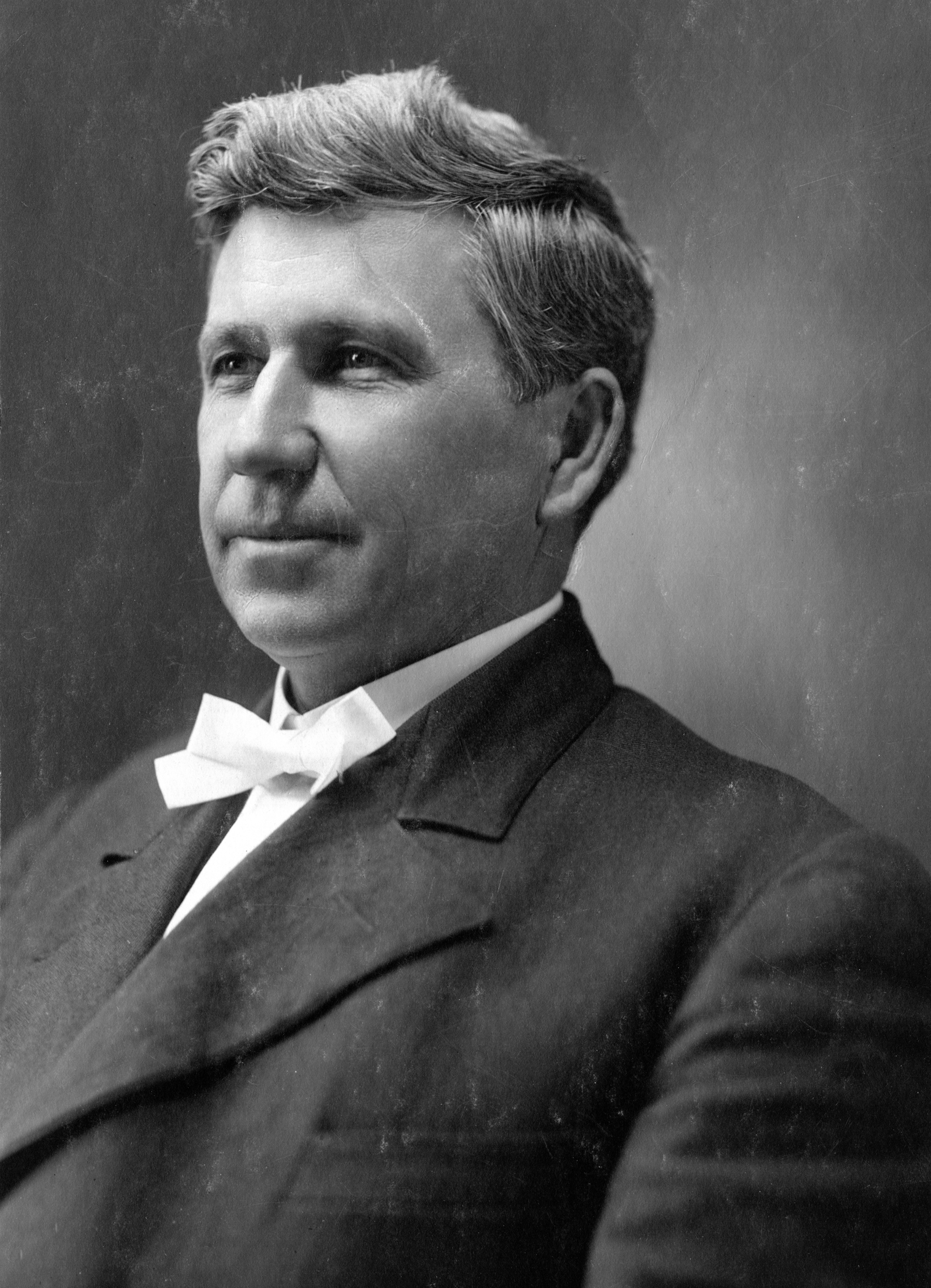

1st Oklahoma Superintendent of Public Instruction
- In office November 16, 1907 – November 16, 1911
- Governor: Charles N. Haskell
- Preceded by: James Edward Dyche (as territorial officeholder)
- Succeeded by: R. H. Wilson

President of the Baptist General Convention of Indian Territory
- In office 1904–1905

Oklahoma Territory Superintendent of Public Instruction
- In office February 21, 1894 – November 30, 1896
- Governor: William Cary Renfrow
- Preceded by: Joseph Homer Parker
- Succeeded by: Albert Owen Nichols

Personal details
- Born: February 26, 1862 Richmond County, North Carolina, U.S.
- Died: July 29, 1923 (aged 61) Tahlequah, Oklahoma, U.S.
- Resting place: Okmulgee, Oklahoma
- Party: Democratic Party
- Spouse: Clara Williams
- Education: Trinity College; Dick and Dillard School of Law

Evan Dhu Cameron was an American politician and educator who served as the first Oklahoma Superintendent of Public Instruction from 1907 to 1911 and as the Oklahoma Territory Superintendent of Public Instruction from 1894 to 1897.

== Early life, education, and early career ==
Evan Dhu Cameron was born on February 26, 1862, to Caroline Crawford and John Worth Cameron in Richmond County, North Carolina as the youngest of seven children. His family was descended from Scottish immigrants. His father was a lawyer, editor, and former military officer. He attended school in Richmond, North Carolina, later attended Trinity College, and graduated from the Dick and Dillard School of Law in 1881. He practiced law for seven years in North Carolina. In 1888 he was licensed by the Methodist Episcopal Church. He worked as a pastor in Texas before moving to Oklahoma Territory in 1891. He married Clara Williams in 1890. In 1901 he switched denominations and joined the Southern Baptist Convention. He was the president of the Baptist General Convention of Indian Territory from 1904 to 1905.

== Political career ==
From February 21, 1894, to November 30, 1896, Cameron served as the Superintendent of Public Instruction, president of the Board of Education, territorial auditor, and president of the board of health for Oklahoma Territory. He was appointed by Oklahoma Territorial Governor William Renfrow to succeed Joseph Homer Parker. While in office, he recommended changes to the law including segregated schools, granting the ability for county superintendents to remove district officials, moving the dates of school bond elections, and banning school employees from working as salesmen for school supplies. He was succeeded in office by Albert Owen Nichols.

In 1907, he was elected for one term as Oklahoma's first Superintendent of Public Instruction as a member of the Democratic Party, serving until 1911. During his tenure he is credited for organizing schools from the former Oklahoma Territory and Indian Territory into one unified education system and implementing the first uniform textbook law in the state. Between 1907 and 1908, over 2,200 new public schools were opened in rural Oklahoma.

== Later life, death, and legacy ==
In 1908, Cameron University in Lawton, Oklahoma was named after him. Cameron helped found Oklahoma Baptist University in 1911 and received an honorary degree from there in 1915. He unsuccessfully ran for Lieutenant Governor of Oklahoma in 1922. He was also a Freemason. Cameron died on July 29, 1923, of a stroke in Tahlequah, Oklahoma. He is buried in Okmulgee, Oklahoma

== Electoral history ==
1907 Oklahoma State Superintendent election
| Party | Candidate | Votes | % | ±% |
|---|---|---|---|---|
| Democratic | Evan Dhu Cameron | 132,962 | 54.8 | New |
| Republican | Calvin Ballard | 99,912 | 41.1 | New |
| Socialist | Joseph A. Hanna | 9,678 | 3.9 | New |
| Democratic gain from | | Swing | N/A | |

Oklahoma State Superintendent Democratic primary (August 2, 1910)
| Party | Candidate | Votes | % |
|---|---|---|---|
| Democratic | R. H. Wilson | 62,337 | 56.7% |
| Democratic | Evan Dhu Cameron (incumbent) | 47,433 | 43.3% |
| Turnout | | 108.770 | |

== Works cited ==
- Stern, A. Kenneth (Fall 1999). "Laying Groundwork for the Future: The Oklahoma Territorial Superintendency and the Superintendents of Public Instruction" (PDF). Chronicles of Oklahoma. 77 (3): 300–321.

Party political offices
| First | Democratic nominee for Oklahoma Superintendent of Public Instruction; 1907 | Succeeded by R. H. Wilson |
