= L. K. Taylor =

American politician (1868–1912)

Member of the Oklahoma Senate from the 15th district
- In office November 16, 1907 – November 16, 1907 Serving with George Johnson
- Preceded by: Position established
- Succeeded by: Joe Smith

Personal details
- Born: 1868 Tennessee, U.S.
- Died: June 1912 (aged 43–44) Greenland, Arkansas, U.S.
- Party: Democratic Party

L. K. Taylor was an American politician who served in the Oklahoma Senate from 1907 to 1910 representing the 15th district as a member of the Democratic Party.

== Early life ==
L. K. Taylor was born in Tennessee in 1868. He later moved to Paducah, Kentucky, and worked as an attorney for 14 years.

== Career ==
Taylor was a member of the 1896 Democratic National Committee.

Taylor served in the Oklahoma Senate from 1907 to 1910, representing the 15th district as a member of the Democratic Party. He was succeeded in office by fellow Democrat Joe Smith. During his tenure, he was an "initiator" of Oklahoma's grandfather clause law.

In 1910, Taylor ran for Clerk of the Oklahoma Supreme Court in the Democratic primary, but he lost to incumbent Swamp Campbell.

== Personal life ==
Taylor died in June 1912 in Greenland, Arkansas.

== Electoral history ==
1910 Oklahoma Clerk of the Supreme Court Democratic primary (August 2, 1910)
Party	Candidate	Votes	%
Democratic	Swamp Campbell	39,921	39.8%
Democratic	L. K. Taylor	25,624	26.2%
Democratic	Neil B. Gardner	19,030	19.5%
Democratic	N. A. Gordon	14,006	14.3%
Turnout		97,581	
