= Pete Hanraty =

American politician and union leader (1864–1932)

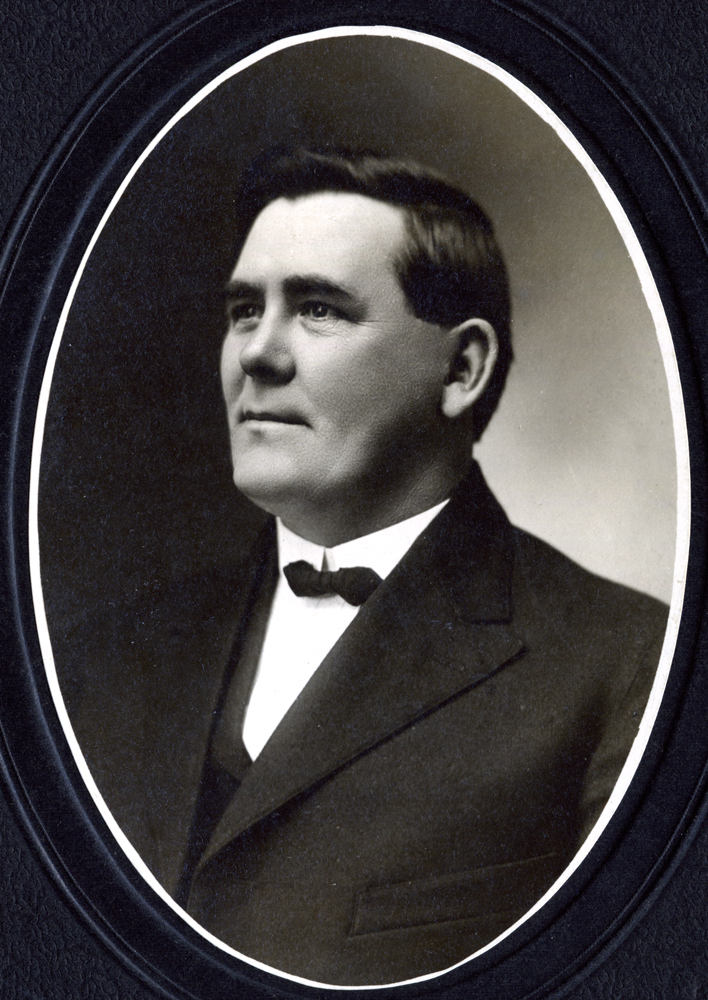

1st Chief Mine Inspector of Oklahoma
- In office November 16, 1907 – November 16, 1911
- Governor: Charles N. Haskell
- Preceded by: Position established
- Succeeded by: Ed Boyle

President of the Twin-Territories Federation of Labor
- In office 1903–1906

Personal details
- Born: Peter Hanraty; 1864 Scotland, United Kingdom
- Died: 1932 (aged 67–68) McAlester, Oklahoma
- Resting place: Memorial Park Cemetery, Oklahoma City
- Political party: Democratic Party

Peter "Pete" Hanraty was an American politician, union leader, and Scottish immigrant who served as the first elected Oklahoma Chief Mine Inspector from 1907 to 1911.

== Early life ==
Pete Hanraty was born in Scotland in 1864. At age nine, he began working in the Scottish coal mines. By eighteen, he immigrated to the United States and found work as a coal miner, but was blacklisted from the coal industry in Pennsylvania and Ohio for union organizing. After being blacklisted, he moved to Indian Territory to find work and unionize miners. At the time, Indian Territory was not regulated by any state or federal law making mining in the territory exceptionally dangerous. He led a successful strike in 1898. At some point in his life, he lost both legs in a mining accident. He was elected president of the Twin-Territories Federation of Labor in 1903, and served in the position until the organization merged into the Oklahoma State Federation of Labor in 1906.

== Political career ==
Hanraty was elected to the Oklahoma Constitutional Convention in 1907 and served as the vice-president of the convention. He contributed most of the sections related to worker's rights. He successfully ran for Oklahoma Chief Mine Inspector in 1907, but lost his 1910 re-election campaign to a primary challenge by Ed Boyle.

== Death and legacy ==
He died in 1932 in McAlester, Oklahoma and was buried at Memorial Park Cemetery in Oklahoma City. He was posthumously inducted into the Oklahoma Labor Hall of Fame.

== Electoral history ==
1907 Oklahoma Chief Mine Inspector election
| Party | Candidate | Votes | % | ±% |
|---|---|---|---|---|
| Democratic | Pete Hanraty | 132,821 | 54.8 | New |
| Republican | David Halstead | 99,596 | 41.1 | New |
| Socialist | David Henderson | 9,610 | 3.9 | New |
| Democratic gain from | | Swing | N/A | |

1910 Oklahoma Chief Mine Inspector Democratic primary
| Party | Candidate | Votes | % |
|---|---|---|---|
| Democratic | Ed Boyle | 51,394 | 51.8% |
| Democratic | Pete Hanraty | 47,726 | 48.1% |
| Turnout | | 99,120 | |

1914 Oklahoma Chief Mine Inspector Democratic primary (August 4, 1914)
| Party | Candidate | Votes | % |
|---|---|---|---|
| Democratic | Ed Boyle | 37,905 | 36.7% |
| Democratic | Pete Hanraty | 26,366 | 25.5% |
| Democratic | Martin Clark | 25,220 | 24.4% |
| Democratic | J. H. Needham | 13,556 | 13.1% |
| Turnout | | 103,047 | |
