= James R. Armstrong =

American judge (1876–1956)

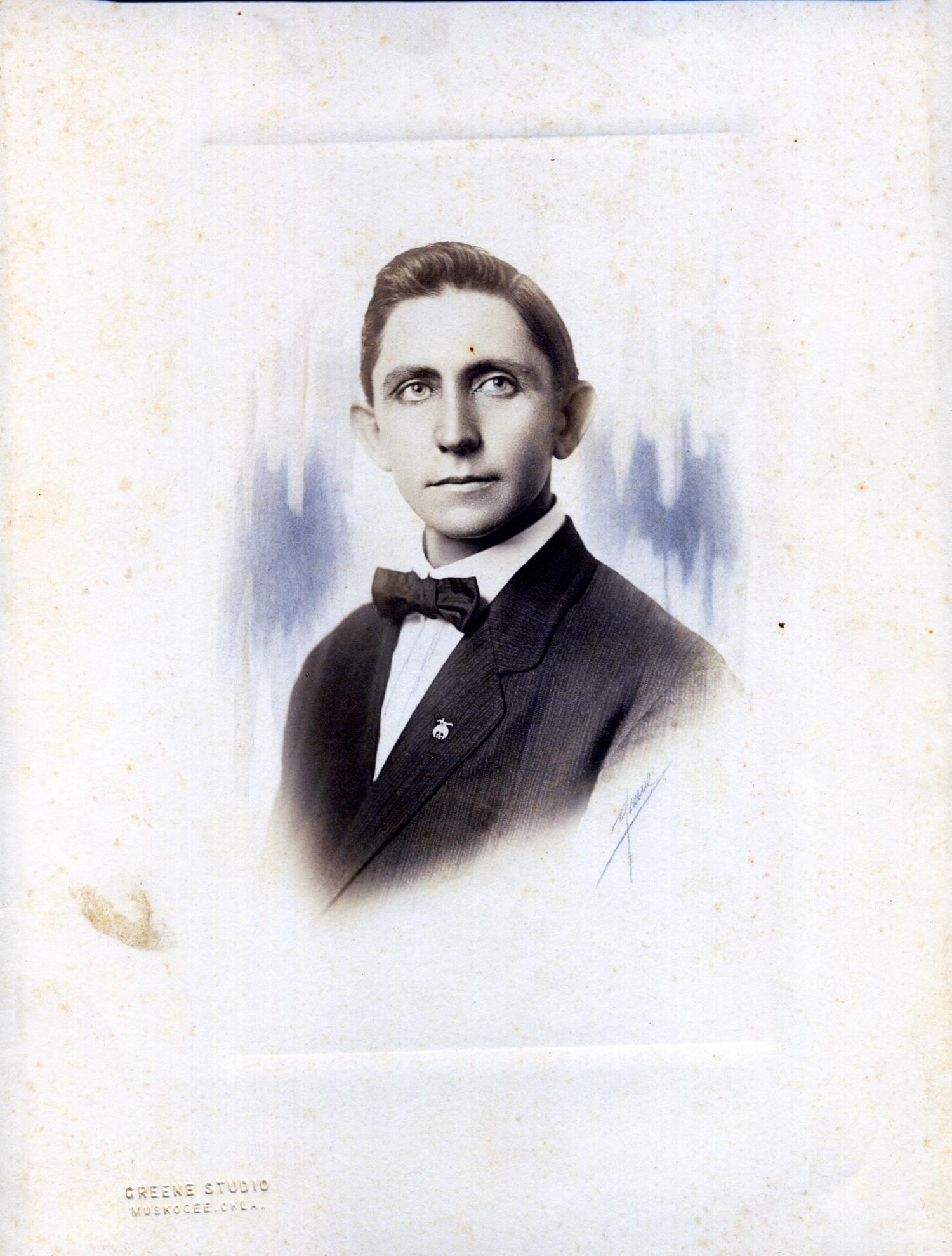

Justice of the Oklahoma Court of Criminal Appeals
- In office 1910–1920
- Preceded by: Position established

Judge for the 6th Judicial District of Oklahoma
- In office 1910–1910

Personal details
- Born: January, 1876 Jackson County, Alabama
- Died: November 25, 1956 Oceanside, California
- Party: Democratic Party
- Education: Ouachita Baptist College; Southern Normal University; Southwestern University

James R. Armstrong (January 1876 – November 25, 1956) was an American judge who served on the Oklahoma Court of Criminal Appeals between 1910 and 1920.

== Biography ==
James R. Armstrong was born in Jackson County, Alabama and attended Ouachita Baptist College, Southern Normal University, and Southwestern University. He was admitted to the Tennessee bar in 1901 and moved to Hugo, Oklahoma (then-Indian Territory) in 1904. He supported the admission of one state instead of two during statehood talks. He was appointed to the Sixth Judicial District covering Choctaw County in 1910 and later that year was elected to the first Oklahoma Court of Criminal Appeals. He served on the court until 1920.

After retirement, he served as the vice president of Middle States Oil Corporation and president of the Columbia Petroleum Corporation. In the 1920s he was an adviser to Governor Henry S. Johnston. He was Baptist, a Freemason, member of the Elks Club, and Independent Order of Odd Fellows. He married Bertha Scott Armstrong and they had two children: William Jefferson Armstrong and Jasper Armstrong. Armstrong died in Oceanside, California, at the age of 80, from injuries received in an automobile accident there two weeks before his death.

== Electoral history ==
1910 Oklahoma Court of Criminal Appeals Eastern District election
Party	Candidate	Votes	%
Democratic	James R. Armstrong	117,409	55.6%
Republican	Thos. C. Humphrey	93,601	44.3%
Democratic gain from			
