= Thomas H. Doyle =

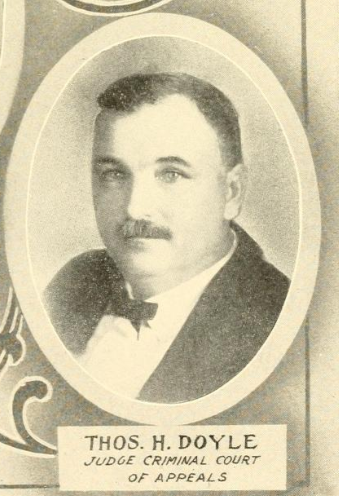

Member of the Oklahoma Territorial House from the 3rd district
- In office 1897–1901
- Preceded by: S. A. Waite
- Succeeded by: John A. Oliphant

Personal details
- Born: Thomas Henchion Doyle; December 21, 1863. Uxbridge, Massachusetts
- Died: February 5, 1949 Oklahoma City, Oklahoma

Thomas Henchion Doyle (1863–1949), a son of Irish immigrants who settled in Massachusetts in the early 19th century, moved to Kansas after birth with his father and four siblings after the death of his mother. He worked in railroad construction to help the family finances, became a lawyer by reading law with an experienced attorney, passed the bar exam in Ottawa, Kansas, married a woman in Kansas City, then moved to the newly formed Oklahoma Territory in 1903, where they settled in a village now known as Perry, Oklahoma.

Doyle became a very successful attorney in Perry, and soon became politically active. He was elected as a non-voting Democratic territorial representative to the U. S. Congress from 1896 to 1901. He was elected Speaker of the House in 1897. He became deeply involved with efforts to obtain statehood for Oklahoma Territory. He acquired the nickname, "Father of the Oklahoma Statehood Bill." Congress seemed to be stalemated politically over whether there should be a single state comprising both Oklahoma and Indian Territories. Doyle was appointed to present the case for a single state in a congressional debate in 1906. His opponent was Bird S. McGuire, who argued the case for creating two separate states. Doyle apparently convinced enough legislators with his well-reasoned presentation emphasizing the progress of people in both territories, as opposed to stoking the long-standing prejudice of many whites toward the natives that the result was to schedule the Oklahoma Organic Act, based on the single-state model for June 16, 1906 and the grant of statehood for November 16, 1907.

== Early life ==
Thomas H. Doyle (1863–1949) was born in Uxbridge, Massachusetts to John and Johanna (née Henchion) Doyle, who had emigrated from Ireland. (Note: Thoburn gives Thomas H. Doyle's birth date as December 21, 1863. The Oklahoma Redbook. also gives the same date.) According to one biography, his mother, Johanna, died in Massachusetts, leaving her husband to care for Thomas and four younger children. He and his family moved to Kansas City, Missouri in 1879, where he got his basic education in public schools. Instead of going to college, he began studying law in the office of Parkinson & Benson in Ottawa, Kansas, and was admitted to the bar in 1893.

== Move to Oklahoma Territory ==
Thomas married Miss Rose O'Neil in 1893, while he was living in Kansas City. Then they moved to Oklahoma Territory and settled in the new community of Perry. Soon after he arrived, he opened a law firm, Stone and Doyle. It was later renamed Stone and Barrett. It prospered in Perry until Doyle's death. Doyle jumped into politics, joined the Democratic Party and was elected to the Oklahoma Territorial House of Representatives, where he served between 1897 and 1901. He was even elected speaker of the house in 1897. Doyle was sent to the U.S. Congress from 1901 to 1907, as a non-partisan and non-voting representative for the Oklahoma Territory. During this time, he was closely involved in petitioning the national government for statehood, and was credited with drawing up the original statehood bill. He acquired the nickname, "Father of the Oklahoma Statehood Bill."

William Jennings Bryan had become a rising star in the Democratic Party across the U.S. By 1896, he was well-positioned to become the party nominee, contesting against the Republican favorite, William McKinley. But in 1902, he was still a dark horse. When he made his initial campaign tour into Oklahoma Territory, he found that his progressive themes played well among potential voters there. Eastern political observers dubbed them,"...dangerous Western radicals." Thomas H. Doyle liked most of what he heard and joined with other Democratic backers of statehood in trying to convince Bryan to move to Oklahoma and lead the fight for Oklahoma statehood. They told Bryan that as soon as statehood was realized, he could run for U. S. Senate and use that position as a springboard for rebuilding his political career.

== Oklahoma statehood debate ==
The issue of statehood for Oklahoma divided the country and congress, as well as the residents of the twin territories, into rival camps over one state versus two. President Roosevelt had already made clear his opposition to creating two states, even if it had meant that he could create none at all. A congressional debate was scheduled for January 16, 1904 with Doyle presenting the one-state side pitted against Bird S. McGuire, speaking for the two state option.

== Oklahoma Court of Appeals ==
In 1908, Doyle was elected as delegate-at-large and chairman of the Oklahoma delegation to the Democratic Party national convention, which was held in Denver, Colorado. In September, 1908, Governor Charles N. Haskell appointed him as an associate justice of what was then named as the Oklahoma Court of Appeals, but has since been renamed as the Oklahoma Court of Criminal Appeals (OCCA). He was elected to the same position in 1915. His OCCA biography states that he became an advocate for human rights during his early years on the court. Doyle served on this court until January 13, 1947, except while serving for six years (1918–1924) on the Industrial Commission. OCCA credits Doyle with being the driving force behind the creation of Northwestern State Normal school at Alva, (Since renamed as Northwestern Oklahoma State University (NWOSU) and the Oklahoma Colored Agricultural & Mechanical school at Langston (Since renamed as Langston University).

== Oklahoma Historical Society activities ==
Doyle became a very active participant in the Oklahoma Historical Society (OHS), and was elected to its board of directors on January 1, 1917. His long service in the state (and territorial) government was a great asset to the organization. Not only did he author many articles that were published in the society's Chronicles of Oklahoma magazine, both before and after retiring from OCCA, he was instrumental in obtaining many mementos for the state Historical Museum through individuals he knew personally. He was elected an officer of the society: first as a vice president, then as president.

== Family ==
Thomas married Rose O'Neil while he was living in Kansas City. They had one daughter. Rose died on July 15, 1936. Thomas soon moved into the Oklahoma City home of his daughter and her husband, where he spent the last years of his life, until he died on the morning of February 5, 1949.
