= Joseph Strain (politician) =

American politician (?-1935)

Member of the Oklahoma Senate from the 33nd district
- In office November 16, 1907 – November 16, 1910
- Preceded by: Position established
- Succeeded by: Gid Graham

Personal details
- Born: 1856 or 1857
- Died: May 1, 1935 Oklahoma City, Oklahoma, U.S.
- Party: Democratic Party

Joseph Strain was an American politician who served in the Oklahoma Senate representing the 33rd district from 1907 to 1910.

== Biography ==
Joseph Strain was born in 1856 or 1857. He was from Sac City, Iowa and moved to Oklahoma Territory in the 1890s. He ran for the 1st district of the Oklahoma Territory Legislature in 1900, but lost to W. M. Ferguson.

Strain served in the Oklahoma Senate representing the 33rd district from 1907 to 1910 as a member of the Democratic Party. He was succeeded in office by fellow Democrat Gid Graham. From 1915 to 1922 he was the assistant tribal superintendent under Gabe Parker. In 1922, he ran for Oklahoma State Treasurer, but lost the Democratic primary to A. S. J. Shaw. He was appointed Oklahoma Bank Commissioner by Governor Jack C. Walton in 1923.

He died on May 1, 1935, in Oklahoma City.
