= Constitution of Oklahoma =

American state constitution

The Constitution of the State of Oklahoma is the governing document of the U.S. state of Oklahoma. Adopted in 1907, Oklahoma ratified the United States Constitution on November 16, 1907, as the 46th U.S. state. At its ratification, the Oklahoma Constitution was the lengthiest governing document of any government in the U.S. (Note: This is no longer true. As of 2014, Alabama's 1901 constitution is now the longest, with more than 376,000 words and 892 amendments. Texas has the second longest, with about 87,000 words. California is second highest in number of amendments at 527.) All U.S. state constitutions are subject to federal judicial review; any provision can be nullified if it conflicts with the U.S. Constitution.

The constitution has been regularly amended, beginning with an amendment approved in the same election in which it was ratified. More than 150 constitutional amendments have been approved by Oklahoma voters.

== History ==
Cartoonist's rendering of Theodore Roosevelt's initial reaction to the Oklahoma Constitution.

From 1890 onward, the land that now forms the State of Oklahoma was made up of the Oklahoma Territory (to the west), and the Indian Territory (to the east). Indian Territory, as its name suggests, had a large Native American population; the territory itself had been reduced over time to its then size.

=== Sequoyah Constitutional Convention ===
The movement to secure statehood for Indian Territory began in 1902 with a convention in Eufaula, consisting of representatives of the "Five Civilized Tribes". The representatives met again in 1903 to organize a constitutional convention.

The Sequoyah Constitutional Convention met in Muskogee, on August 21, 1905. General Pleasant Porter, Principal Chief of the Creek Nation, was selected as president of the convention. The elected delegates decided that the executive officers of the Five Civilized Tribes would also be appointed as vice-presidents: William Charles Rogers, Principal Chief of the Cherokees; William H. Murray, appointed by Chickasaw Governor Douglas H. Johnston to represent the Chickasaws; Chief Green McCurtain of the Choctaws; Chief John Brown of the Seminoles; and Charles N. Haskell, selected to represent the Creeks (as General Porter had been elected President).

The convention drafted a constitution, drew up a plan of organization for the government, put together a map showing the counties to be established, and elected delegates to go to the United States Congress to petition for statehood. The convention's proposals were then put to a referendum in Indian Territory, in which they were overwhelmingly endorsed.

The delegation received a cool reception in Washington. Eastern politicians, fearing the admission of two more Western states, and no doubt unwilling to admit an "Indian" state, put pressure on the U.S. President, Theodore Roosevelt, who finally ruled that the Indian and Oklahoma Territories would be granted statehood only as a combined state.

The hard work of the Sequoyah State Constitutional Convention was not entirely lost, however. When representatives from Indian Territory joined the Oklahoma State Constitutional Convention in Guthrie the next year, they brought their constitutional experience with them. The Sequoyah Constitution served in large part as the basis for the constitution of the State of Oklahoma, which came into being with the merger of the two territories in 1907.

=== List of Prominent Delegates to the Sequoyah Convention ===
- William H. Murray (Constitutional Convention President, ninth Governor of Oklahoma, first Speaker of the Oklahoma House of Representatives)
- Charles N. Haskell (first Governor of Oklahoma)
- Robert L. Williams (third Governor of Oklahoma, first Chief Justice of Oklahoma)
- Henry S. Johnston (Constitution Convention President Pro Tempore, seventh Governor of Oklahoma, first President pro tempore of the Oklahoma Senate)
- Pete Hanraty (Constitution Convention Vice President)
- Albert H. Ellis (Constitutional Convention Second Vice President)
- Charles M. McClain (Constitutional Convention Secretary)
- Charles H. Filson (Secretary of Oklahoma)
- James S. Buchanan (President of the University of Oklahoma)

=== Oklahoma Constitutional Convention ===
The final nail in the coffin of the proposed State of Sequoyah was an Enabling Act passed by Congress on June 6, 1906 that provided for a single state to be created from the so-called "Twin Territories." The act further specified that elections would be held in both territories on November 6, 1906 to elect delegates for a constitutional convention. Each territory was to elect 55 delegates. The Osage Nation was allowed two delegates, giving a total of 112 delegates. (Note: According to the Encyclopedia of Oklahoma History and Culture, the total delegation was divided as 99 Democrats (known as the "ninety and nine"), 12 Republicans (known as the "twelve apostles.") The remaining delegate, an independent, was known as "the renegade.")

The Oklahoma Constitutional Convention opened in Guthrie on November 20, 1906. William H. Murray was elected chairman of the convention. (Note: Chief Pleasant Porter, who had presided over the Sequoyah Convention, had died in 1905, after the previous convention was over.) Charles N. Haskell was elected the majority floor leader by the Democrats, and Henry Asp was elected minority floor leader by the Republicans. William Jennings Bryan came to encourage the delegates to write, "the very best constitution ever written." (Note: According to Atkinson, it was generally agreed that Bryan was "the most important outside influence on the Oklahoma Constitutional Convention.") Bryan proposed that they accomplish this by consulting previously written state constitutions. The delegates not only complied, but also consulted the proceedings of the Sequoyah Convention, and the U.S. Constitution. Having completed a draft document, they adjourned March 15, 1907. There were two additional week-long sessions called to finish the draft before it was put before the voters on September 17, 1907. (Note: Adkison notes that September 17 was chosen because the drafters of the U.S. Constitution had finished their work and adjourned on that day in 1787. He also noted that the "...document was innovative in the sense that so many progressive provisions were included.") Eligible voters approved their new Constitution a 71 percent yes vote. Satisfied with the proposed document, President Theodore Roosevelt signed the necessary papers November 16, 1907, and announced, "Oklahoma is now a state."

==== Members ====
Members of the Oklahoma Constitutional convention included:

- L. J. Akers
- R. J. Allen
- J. A. Alderson
- H. E. Asp
- J. A. Baker
- W. E. Banks
- G. M. Berry
- G. N. Bilby
- C. W. Board
- C. H. Bowers
- O. H. P. Brewer Jr.
- B. E. Bryant
- James S. Buchanan
- W. A. Cain
- J. J. Carney
- J. M. Carr
- W. J. Caudill
- J. H. Chambers
- H. L. Cloud
- J. H. N. Cobb
- A. G. Cochran
- Riley Copeland
- H. P. Covey
- J. J. Curl
- W. T. Dalton
- W. S. Dearing
- William A. Durant (Sergeant at arms)
- W. H. Edley
- J. T. Edmondson
- Albert H. Ellis (Vice-president)
- C. C. Fisher
- C. O. Frye
- N. B. Gardner
- J. C. Graham
- Pete Hanraty (Vice-president)
- D. G. Harned
- J. A. Harris
- J. B. Harrison
- Benjamin F. Harrison
- Charles N. Haskell
- A. L. Hausam
- Samuel W. Hayes
- W. L. Helton
- W. F. Hendricks
- George A. Henshaw
- F. E. Herring
- J. K. Hill
- David Hogg
- P. B. Hopkins
- R. E. Houston
- W. B. Hudson
- W. C. Hughes
- Walter Davis Humphrey
- W. T. S. Hunt
- T. O. James
- W. D. Jenkins
- Henry S. Johnston
- Cham Jones
- Matthew John Kane
- Henry Kelly
- J. F. King
- W. H. Kornegay
- J. H. Langley
- Milas Lasater
- J. S. Latimer
- T. J. Leahy
- B. F. Lee
- C. S. Leeper
- W. A. Ledbetter
- W. C. Leidtke
- W. N. Littlejohn
- I. B. Littleton
- E. O. McCance
- Charles M. McClain
- P. J. McClure
- J. C. Majors
- Christopher Columbus Mathies
- J. Harvey Maxey
- E. F. Messenger
- J. L. Mitch
- C. L. Moore
- William H. Murray (President)
- Flowers Nelson
- E. G. Newell
- J. K. Norton
- Gabe E. Parker
- C. H. Pittman
- J. J. Quarles
- S. N. Ramsey
- Thad Rice
- Luke Roberts
- C. V. Rogers
- D. S. Rose
- J. M. Sandlin
- J. E. Sater
- J. J. Savage
- Edwin Sorrells
- E. J. Stowe
- J. W. Swarts
- J. B. Tosh
- H. O. Tener
- F. C. Tracy
- G. M. Tucker
- H. G. Turner
- Carlton Weaver
- E. R. Williams
- Boone Williams
- R. L. Williams
- D. P. Willis
- George W. Wood
- J. I. Wood
- Thomas Charles Wyatt
- A. S. Wyly
- John M. Young (Secretary)

== Preamble ==
The Oklahoma Constitution Preamble reads:

Invoking the guidance of Almighty God, in order to secure and perpetuate the blessing of liberty; to secure just and rightful government; to promote our mutual welfare and happiness, we, the people of the State of Oklahoma, do ordain and establish this Constitution.

== Article of the Constitution ==
The remainder of the constitution consists of twenty-nine articles, with the first eight pertaining to the state’s government.

=== Federal Relations ===
Article One establishes how the state of Oklahoma is to relate to the United States federal government, stating that the US Constitution is the Supreme Law of the Land. By this article, religious freedom is established, polygamy is forbidden, the debts of Oklahoma Territory are acquired by the State of Oklahoma, public school are established to be taught only in English, and that suffrage shall never be revoked due to “race, color, or previous condition of servitude.”

=== Bill of Rights ===
Article Two enumerates the rights of all citizens of the State of Oklahoma. These include that all political power derives from the people, the inherent rights “to life, liberty, the pursuit of happiness, and the enjoyment of the gains of their own industry,” the right to peaceful assembly, a ban on the interference with suffrage, the definition of treason, the right to trial by jury, that marriage in the State of Oklahoma is defined as being between a man and a woman, and many others. The right of a citizen to keep and bear arms in defense of his home, person, or property, or in aid of the civil power, when thereunto legally summoned, shall never be prohibited; but nothing herein contained shall prevent the Legislature from regulating the carrying of weapons.

=== Suffrage ===
Article Three deals with suffrage in the State of Oklahoma. All peoples of the age of 18 are qualified electors in the state and a State Elector Board is established charged with the supervision of such elections as the Legislature shall direct. No elector in Oklahoma may vote in any election unless previously registered to do so with the state, and all elections must be “free and equal,” as no “power, civil or military, shall ever interfere to prevent the free exercise of the right of suffrage,” and “electors shall be privileged from arrest during their attendance on elections and while going to and from the same” except in cases of treason against the state.

=== Separation of Powers ===
Article Four established the Government of Oklahoma under the doctrine of separation of powers and reads:

The powers of the government of the State of Oklahoma shall be divided into three separate departments: The Legislative, Executive, and Judicial; and except as provided in this Constitution, the Legislative, Executive, and Judicial departments of government shall be separate and distinct, and neither shall exercise the powers properly belonging to either of the others.

=== Legislative power ===
Article Five establishes the legislative branch of government, Oklahoma Legislature, which includes the House of Representatives and the Senate. The article establishes the manner of election and qualifications of members of each House, and includes a unique term limits provision in Section 17A: no member can serve more than 12 years total in the legislature, whether in one chamber or in both chambers. In addition, it provides for free debate in the legislature, limits self-serving behavior by senators and representatives, outlines legislative procedure and indicates the powers of the legislative branch.

=== Executive power ===
Article Six describes the governorship (the executive branch): procedures for the selection of the governor, qualifications for office, the oath to be affirmed and the powers and duties of the office. It also provides for the office of Lieutenant Governor of Oklahoma, and specifies that the lieutenant governor succeeds to the governorship if the governor is incapacitated, dies, or resigns. Other executive offices and departments created in the article are the Secretary of State, the Attorney General, the State Treasurer, the State Auditor and Inspector, the State Superintendent of Public Instruction, the Insurance Commissioner, the Commissioner of Labor, the Department of Mines, the Board of Agriculture, and the Commissioners of the Land Office.

=== Judicial power ===
Article Seven describes the court system (the judicial branch), which is unique in that it establishes two courts of last resort (only neighboring state Texas has a similar system). The Article vests the judicial power in a Supreme Court, a Court of Criminal Appeals, a Worker's Compensation Court, a Court of Tax Review, and such intermediate, trial level and municipal courts as the Legislature, at its discretion, may establish. As written in the Constitution, the Legislature is given the enumerated power to dissolve any court in Oklahoma at any time, except the Supreme Court. All civil judgments are reviewable by the Supreme Court and all criminal judgement are reviewable by the Court of Criminal Appeals.

The Article also creates the Oklahoma Court of Impeachment (charged with removal all elected officials from office) and the Oklahoma Court on the Judiciary (charged with reviewing Justices and Judges). The Article continues to further describe how Justices and Judges are selected, and how and under what circumstances Justices and Judges are removed from office.

=== Impeachment ===
Article Eight states that all state elected offices, including Supreme Court Justices, are subject to impeachment for wilful neglect of duty, corruption in office, habitual drunkenness, incompetency, or any offense involving moral turpitude committed while in office. The Oklahoma House of Representatives must bring the charges against the individual with the Oklahoma Senate serving as the Court on Impeachment, with the Chief Justice of Oklahoma serving as the court's judge. If charged with impeachment and found guilty, the official’s term is immediately suspended.

=== Remaining Articles ===
- Article Nine - Corporations
- Article Ten - Taxes and Revenue in General
- Article Eleven - State and School Lands
- Article Twelve - Homestead and Exemptions
  - Article Twelve A - Homestead Exemption From Taxation
- Article Thirteen - Education
  - Article Thirteen A - Oklahoma State System of Higher Education
  - Article Thirteen B - Board of Regents of Oklahoma Colleges
- Article Fourteen - Banks and Banking
- Article Fifteen - Oath of Office
- Article Sixteen - Public Roads
- Article Seventeen - Counties
- Article Eighteen - Municipal Corporations
- Article Nineteen - Insurance
- Article Twenty - Manufacture and Commerce
- Article Twenty-one - Public Institutions
- Article Twenty-two - Alien and Corporate Ownership of Lands
- Article Twenty-three - Miscellaneous
- Article Twenty-four - Constitutional Amendments
  - The Oklahoma Constitution permits three methods of amendment: 1) amendments by the Oklahoma Legislature (requires majority vote of both houses and approval by majority of the voters at next general election; the Legislature can by 2/3 vote place the amendment on a special election), 2) constitutional convention (a call for such requires majority voter approval before the convention is held, and any amendments or new constitution requires majority voter approval, but such a call must be made at least once every 20 years), or 3) via an initiative petition.
- Article Twenty-five - Social Security
- Article Twenty-six - Department of Wildlife Conservation
- Article Twenty-seven - Oklahoma Alcoholic Beverage Control Board (repealed)
- Article Twenty-eight - Alcoholic Beverage Laws And Enforcement
- Article Twenty-nine - Ethics Commission
- Article Thirty - Official Actions of the State of Oklahoma

The final section of the Oklahoma Constitution deals with laws and other ordinances in place in the Territory of Oklahoma before its admission to the Union in 1907.

== Section Attestations ==
The Oklahoma Constitution ends with the officers and delegates to the Constitutional Convention signing the documents. It reads:

Done in open Convention at the City of Guthrie, in the Territory of Oklahoma, on this, the sixteenth day of July, in the year of our Lord one thousand nine hundred and seven, and the Independence of the United States of America one hundred and thirty-first.

- John McLain Young, Secretary.
- William H. Murray, President of the Constitutional Convention of the proposed State of Oklahoma and Delegate from District No. 104.
- Pete Hanraty, Vice President
- Chas. H. Filson, Secretary of Oklahoma.
- Albert H. Ellis, Second Vice President and Delegate 14" District.

Territory of Oklahoma, Logan County:

I, Wm. H. Murray, President of the Constitutional Convention of the proposed State of Oklahoma, do hereby certify that the within and foregoing is the original parchment enrollment of the Constitution and the several articles thereof adopted by the Constitutional Convention of the proposed State of Oklahoma, to be submitted to the people of the proposed State of Oklahoma for ratification, and that all the interlineations therein contained and all the erasures and words stricken out, were made and done before the same was signed by the President, the Vice-Presidents, and the members of said Convention.

Witness my hand this the sixteenth day of July, A. D., Nineteen Hundred and Seven.

William H. Murry, President of the Constitutional Convention of the proposed State of Oklahoma
John McLain Young, Secretary

== See also ==
- Enabling Act of 1906
- Coyle v. Smith
- Government of Oklahoma
- Governor of Oklahoma
- List of Oklahoma ballot measures
- Oklahoma Legislature
- Oklahoma Supreme Court
- Politics of Oklahoma

== Additional resources ==
- Morgan, David R., Robert E. England and George G. Humphreys. Oklahoma Politics and Policies: Governing the Sooner State. 1991. University of Nebraska Press. ISBN 0-8032-3106-7.
