= 2010 Oklahoma elections =

The 2010 Oklahoma elections were held on November 2, 2010. The primary election was held on July 27. The runoff primary election was held August 24.

The Republican Party swept every statewide election and expanded its majorities in both state legislative chambers. An extremely socially conservative state, Oklahoma has not voted Democratic in a presidential election since 1964 but remained reliably Democratic at the state level well into the 2000s. This election marked a new and decisive alignment in the state's partisanship at all levels of government, with the GOP continuing to make gains in almost every election since.

== Overview ==
NOTES:

- Bob Anthony and Jeff Cloud were not on the 2010 ballot due to the staggered election terms of the Corporation Commission.
- With Todd Lamb's election to lieutenant governor, one Oklahoma Senate seat remains vacant, to be filled in a January 2011 special election.

Executive Branch Before Election

Office	Current Officer	Party
Governor of Oklahoma	Brad Henry	Democratic
Lieutenant Governor	Jari Askins	Democratic
State Auditor and Inspector	Steve Burrage	Democratic
Attorney General	Drew Edmondson	Democratic
State Treasurer	Scott Meacham	Democratic
State School Superintendent	Sandy Garrett	Democratic
Labor Commissioner	Lloyd Fields	Democratic
Insurance Commissioner	Kim Holland	Democratic
Corporation Commissioner	Dana Murphy	Republican
Corporation Commissioner	Bob Anthony	Republican
Corporation Commissioner	Jeff Cloud	Republican

Legislature Before Election

House	Democrats	Republicans
Oklahoma Senate	22	26
Oklahoma House of Representatives	39	62

Congressional Delegation Before Election

Office	Current Officer	Party
United States Senator	Tom Coburn	Republican
US Representative - District 1	John Sullivan	Republican
US Representative - District 2	Dan Boren	Democrat
US Representative - District 3	Frank Lucas	Republican
US Representative - District 4	Tom Cole	Republican
US Representative - District 5	Mary Fallin	Republican

Executive Branch After Election

Office	Current Officer	Party
Governor of Oklahoma	Mary Fallin	Republican
Lieutenant Governor	Todd Lamb	Republican
State Auditor and Inspector	Gary Jones	Republican
Attorney General	Scott Pruitt	Republican
State Treasurer	Ken A. Miller	Republican
State School Superintendent	Janet Barresi	Republican
Labor Commissioner	Mark Costello	Republican
Insurance Commissioner	John Doak	Republican
Corporation Commissioner	Dana Murphy	Republican
Corporation Commissioner	Bob Anthony	Republican
Corporation Commissioner	Jeff Cloud	Republican

Legislature After Election

House	Democrats	Republicans
Oklahoma Senate	16	32
Oklahoma House of Representatives	31	70

Congressional Delegation After Election

Office	Current Officer	Party
United States Senator	Tom Coburn	Republican
US Representative - District 1	John Sullivan	Republican
US Representative - District 2	Dan Boren	Democrat
US Representative - District 3	Frank Lucas	Republican
US Representative - District 4	Tom Cole	Republican
US Representative - District 5	James Lankford	Republican

== Governor ==
2010 Oklahoma gubernatorial election
- November 2, 2010
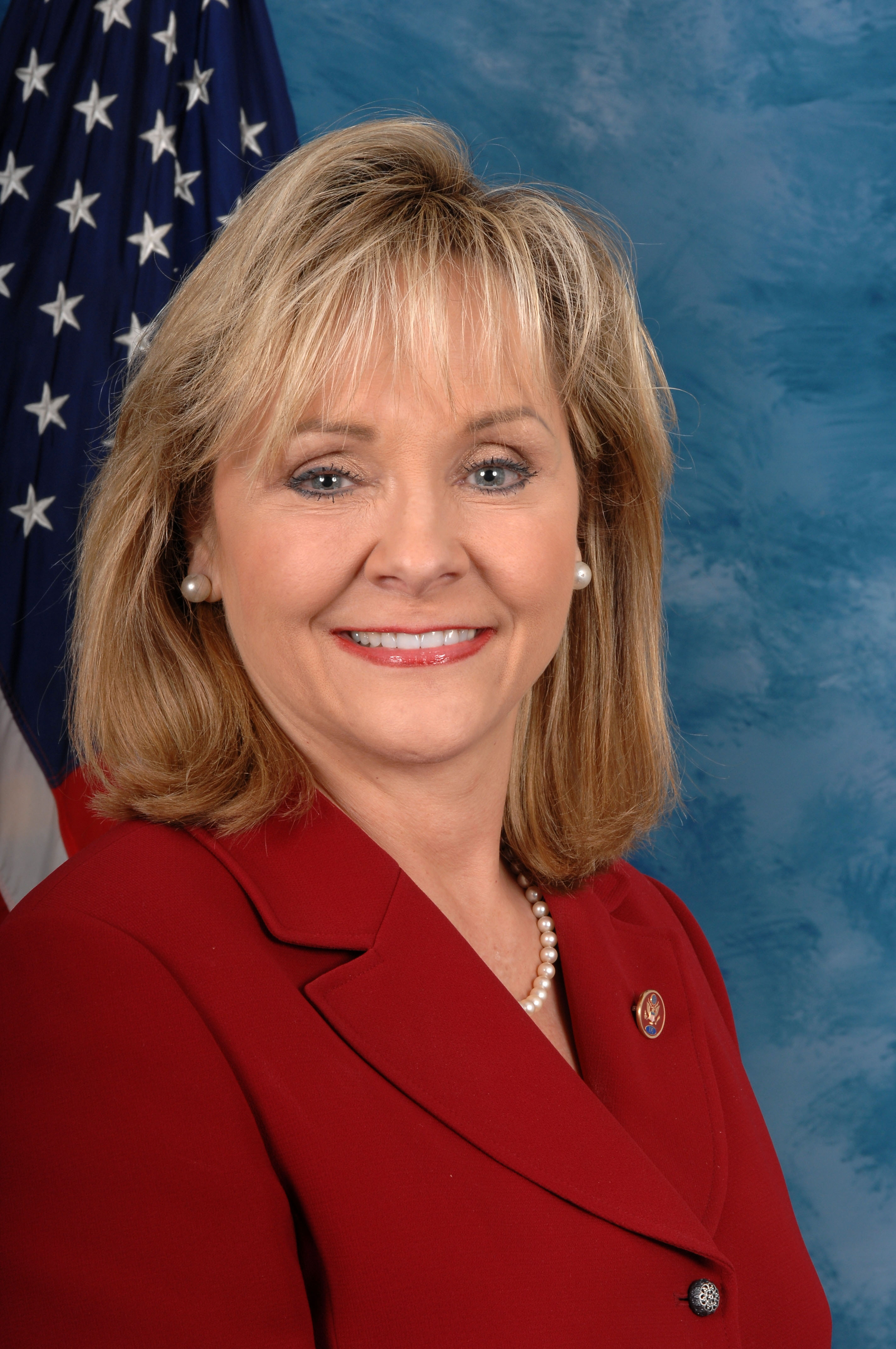

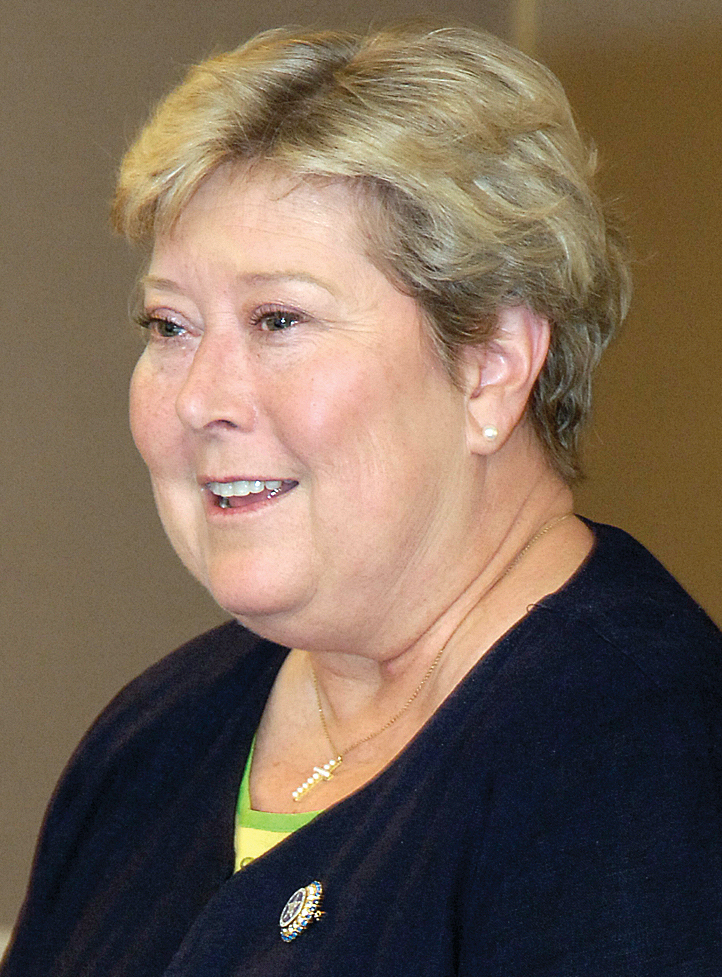
Nominee	Mary Fallin	Jari Askins
Party	Republican	Democratic
Popular vote	625,506	409,261
Percentage	60.4%	39.6%
- County results Fallin: 50–60% 60–70% 70–80% 80–90% Askins: 50–60%
Governor before election
Brad Henry
Democratic
Elected Governor
Mary Fallin
Republican

The 2010 gubernatorial election determined the successor of incumbent Democratic governor Brad Henry, who, due to term limits placed on him by the Oklahoma Constitution, could not seek re-election.

=== Candidates ===
Democrats

- Jari Askins - current lieutenant governor of Oklahoma
- Drew Edmondson - current attorney general of Oklahoma

Republicans

- Roger L. Jackson - retired businessman, former president of the Oklahoma Office Machine Dealers Association (OOMDA)
- Mary Fallin - former lieutenant governor and current congresswoman for Oklahoma's 5th Congressional
- Randy Brogdon - current state senator
- Robert Hubbard - business owner of Piedmont, Oklahoma's "Hubbard Ranch Supply"

=== Democratic primary ===
Democratic primary results
Party	Candidate	Votes	%
Democratic	Jari Askins	132,591	50.28
Democratic	Drew Edmondson	131,097	49.72
Total votes		263,688	100.00

=== General election ===
2010 Oklahoma gubernatorial election
Party	Candidate	Votes	%	±%
Republican	Mary Fallin	625,506	60.45%	+26.95%
Democratic	Jari Askins	409,261	39.55%	−26.95%
Total votes		1,034,767	100.00%	
Republican gain from Democratic				

== Lieutenant governor ==
The 2010 lieutenant governor election determined the successor of incumbent Democratic lieutenant governor Jari Askins, who stepped down to run for governor.

=== Candidates ===
Democrats

- Kenneth Corn - current state senator

Republicans

- Bernie Adler - Oklahoma City real estate investor
- Todd Lamb - current state senator
- John A. Wright - current state representative
- Bill Crozier - former Republican candidate for Superintendent of Public Instruction
- Paul F. Nosak - Oklahoma City resident

Independent

- Richard Prawdzienski - Edmond resident

=== Primary ===
Corn ran unopposed in the Democratic primary.

Republican

Candidate	Votes	Percentage
Bernie Adler	10,515	4.5%
John A. Wright	41,177	17.6%
Todd Lamb	156,834	66.9%
Paul Nosak	13,941	6.0%
Bill Crozier	12,177	5.2%

=== General ===
Oklahoma lieutenant governor election, 2010
Party	Candidate	Votes	%
Republican	Todd Lamb	659,242	64.03
Democratic	Kenneth Corn	334,711	32.51
Independent	Richard Prawdzienski	35,665	3.46
Total votes		1,029,618	100

== State auditor ==
2010 Oklahoma State Auditor and Inspector election
- November 2, 2010
Nominee	Gary Jones	Steve Burrage
Party	Republican	Democratic
Popular vote	570,174	449,152
Percentage	55.9%	44.1%
- County results Jones: 50–60% 60–70% 70–80% 80–90% Burrage: 50–60% 60–70%
State Auditor and Inspector before election
Steve Burrage
Democratic
Elected State Auditor and Inspector
Gary Jones
Republican

The 2010 state auditor and inspector election was the first election for the office of state auditor and inspector since former Democratic state auditor Jeff McMahan was forced to resign in 2008 due to corruption charges.

Governor Brad Henry appointed fellow Democrat Steve Burrage to serve out the remainder of McMahan's unexpired term. Burrage then sought a full term in office but lost to Gary Jones, who was making his third run for the office. Despite losing by 11.8%, Burrage had the second best performance of any statewide Democrat and was only one of two to get over 40% of the vote (the other being Insurance Commissioner Kim Holland).

Article 6, Section 19 of the Oklahoma Constitution places one additional requirement upon the State Auditor and Inspector beyond the other constitutional requirements for those seeking statewide offices. The auditor must have at least 3 years of prior experience as an "expert accountant" before seeking office. (The term "expert accountant" is not defined but is generally understood to require that the officeholder must be a certified public accountant.)

=== Candidates ===
Democrats

- Steve Burrage - incumbent State Auditor

Republican

- David Hanigar - Pocasset certified public accountant and United States Navy submariner during Vietnam War
- Gary Jones - Lawton certified public accountant, former Comanche County commissioner and current chairman of the Oklahoma Republican Party

=== Primary ===
Burrage ran unopposed in the Democratic primary.

Republican

Candidate	Votes	Percentage
Gary Jones	151,712	69.6%
David Hanigar	66,364	30.4%

=== General ===
Oklahoma state auditor election, 2010
Party	Candidate	Votes	%
Republican	Gary Jones	570,174	55.94
Democratic	Steve Burrage (incumbent)	449,152	44.06
Total votes		1,019,326	100

== Attorney general ==
2010 Oklahoma Attorney General election
- November 2, 2010
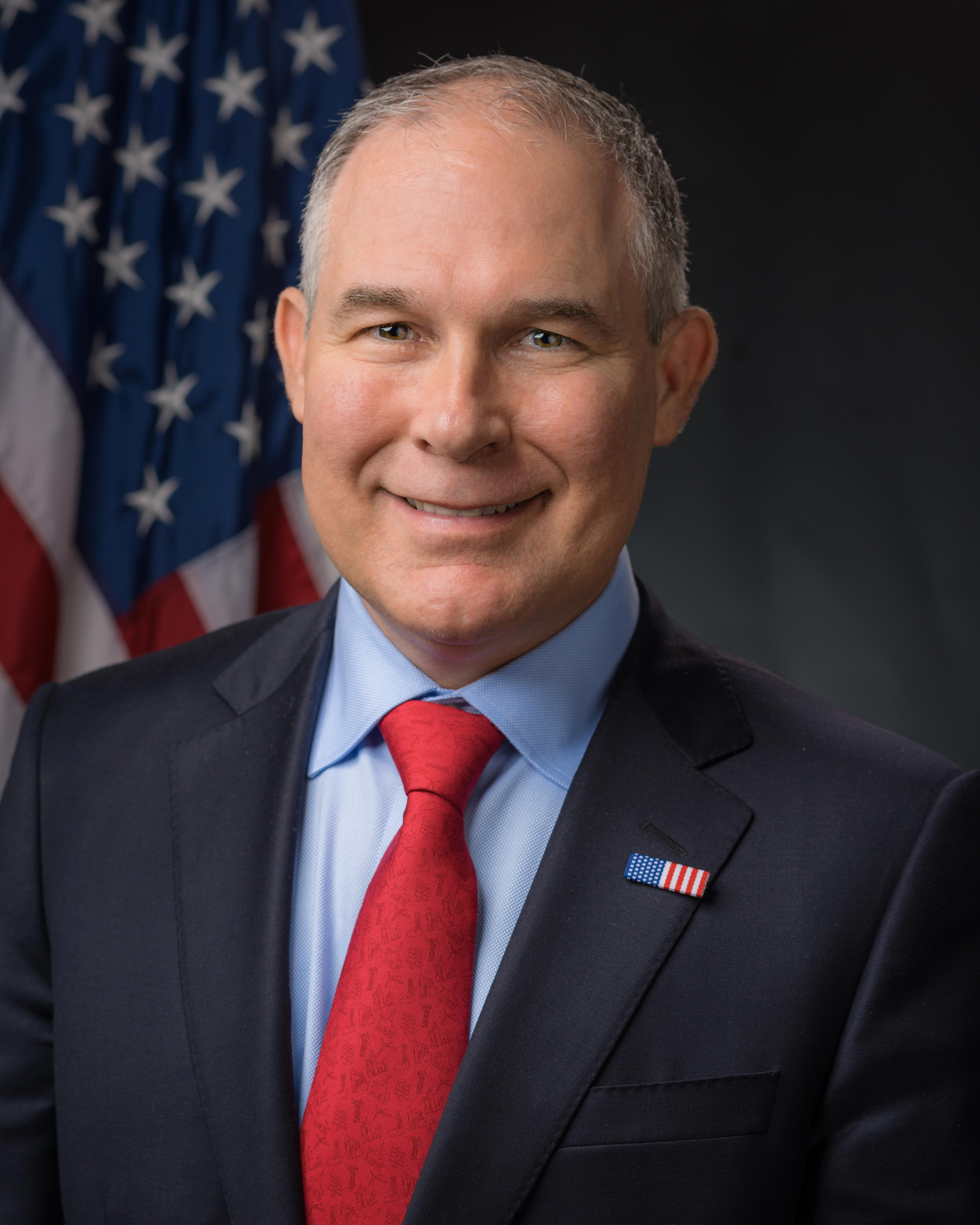

Nominee	Scott Pruitt	Jim Priest
Party	Republican	Democratic
Popular vote	666,407	357,162
Percentage	65.1%	34.9%
- County results Pruitt: 50–60% 60–70% 70–80% 80–90% Priest: 50–60%
Attorney General before election
Drew Edmondson
Democratic
Elected Attorney General
Scott Pruitt
Republican

The 2010 attorney general election determined the successor of incumbent Democratic attorney general Drew Edmondson, who stepped down to run for governor but lost in the Democratic Party primary.

=== Candidates ===
Democrats

- Jim Priest - Oklahoma City defense attorney

Republicans

- Ryan Leonard - former state prosecutor in Canadian County and former senior aide to former U.S. senator Don Nickles
- Scott Pruitt - former state senator from Tulsa

=== Primary ===
Priest ran unopposed in the Democratic primary.

Republican

Candidate	Votes	Percentage
Ryan Leonard	105,343	44.0%
Scott Pruitt	134,335	56.0%

=== General ===
Oklahoma attorney general election, 2010
Party	Candidate	Votes	%
Republican	Scott Pruitt	666,407	65.11
Democratic	Jim Priest	357,162	34.89
Total votes		1,023,569	100

== State treasurer ==
2010 Oklahoma state treasurer election
- November 2, 2010
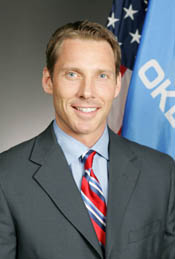

Nominee	Ken A. Miller	Stephen Covert
Party	Republican	Democratic
Popular vote	675,515	339,272
Percentage	66.6%	33.4%
- County results Miller: 50–60% 60–70% 70–80% 80–90%
State Treasurer before election
Scott Meacham
Democratic
Elected State Treasurer
Ken A. Miller
Republican

The 2010 State Treasurer election determined the successor of incumbent Democratic State Treasurer Scott Meacham, who declined to seek a second full term in office.

=== Candidates ===
Democrats

- Stephen E. Covert - Midwest City resident

Republicans

- Owen Laughlin - lawyer and businessman from Woodward, former state senator
- Ken Miller - current state representative, current chair of the House Appropriations and Budget Committee and economics professor at Oklahoma Christian University

=== Primary ===
Covert ran unopposed in the Democratic primary.

Republican

Candidate	Votes	Percentage
Ken Miller	145,415	63.0%
Owen Laughlin	85,240	37.0%

=== General ===
Oklahoma state treasurer general election, 2010
Party	Candidate	Votes	%
Republican	Ken A. Miller	675,515	66.57
Democratic	Stephen Covert	339,272	33.43
Total votes		1,014,787	100

== Superintendent of public instruction ==
2010 Oklahoma Superintendent of Public Instruction election
Nominee	Janet Barresi	Susan Paddack	Richard Cooper
Party	Republican	Democratic	Independent
Popular vote	573,716	387,007	65,243
Percentage	55.9%	37.7%	6.4%
- County results Barresi: 40–50% 50–60% 60–70% 70–80% Paddack: 40–50% 50–60% 60–70%
Superintendent of Public Instruction before election
Sandy Garrett
Democratic
Elected Superintendent of Public Instruction
Janet Barresi
Republican

The 2010 Superintendent of Public Instruction election determined the successor of incumbent Democratic Superintendent Sandy Garrett, who declined to seek a sixth full term in office.

=== Candidates ===
Democrats

- Jerry Combrink - former Boswell Public Schools superintendent
- Susan Paddack - current state senator from Ada

Republican

- Janet Barresi - charter school founder, dentist, and school speech pathologist from Edmond
- Brian S. Kelly - educator from Edmond

Independents

- Richard E. Cooper - former educator

=== Primary ===
Republican

Candidate	Votes	Percentage
Janet Barresi	145,433	62.7%
Brian S. Kelly	86,430	37.3%

=== General ===
Oklahoma superintendent of public instruction general election, 2010
Party	Candidate	Votes	%
Republican	Janet Barresi	573,716	55.92
Democratic	Susan Paddack	387,007	37.72
Independent	Richard Cooper	65,243	6.36
Total votes		1,025,966	100

== Labor commissioner ==
2010 Oklahoma Commissioner of Labor election
- November 2, 2010
Nominee	Mark Costello	Lloyd Fields
Party	Republican	Democratic
Popular vote	649,748	362,805
Percentage	64.2%	35.8%
- County results Costello: 50–60% 60–70% 70–80% 80–90% Fields: 50–60%
Commissioner of Labor before election
Lloyd Fields
Democratic
Elected Commissioner of Labor
Mark Costello
Republican

Incumbent Democratic Labor Commissioner Lloyd Fields was defeated in an attempt to win a second full term in office.

=== Candidates ===
Democrats

- Lloyd Fields - incumbent Labor Commissioner

Republican

- Mark Costello - businessman from Edmond
- Jason Reese - labor attorney from Oklahoma City

=== Primary ===
Fields ran unopposed in the Democratic primary.

Republican

Candidate	Votes	Percentage
Mark Costello	127,413	57.0%
Jason Reese	95,869	43.0%

=== General ===
Oklahoma commissioner of labor general election, 2010
Party	Candidate	Votes	%
Republican	Mark Costello	649,748	64.17
Democratic	Lloyd Fields (incumbent)	362,805	35.83
Total votes		1,012,553	100

== Insurance commissioner ==
2010 Oklahoma Insurance Commissioner election
Nominee	John D. Doak	Kim Holland
Party	Republican	Democratic
Popular vote	555,740	464,310
Percentage	54.5%	45.5%
- County results Doak: 50–60% 60–70% 80–90% Holland: 50–60% Tie
Insurance Commissioner before election
Kim Holland
Democratic
Elected Insurance Commissioner
John D. Doak
Republican

Incumbent Democratic Insurance Commissioner Kim Holland was defeated in an attempt to win a second full term in office.

=== Candidates ===
Democrats

- Kim Holland - incumbent Insurance Commissioner

Republicans

- John Doak - insurance agent from Tulsa
- Mark Croucher - insurance agent from Jenks
- John P. Crawford - former Insurance Commissioner (1995–1999)

=== Primary ===
Incumbent Holland ran unopposed in the Democratic primary.

Republican Primary

Candidate	Votes	Percentage
John P. Crawford	92,924	41.7%
John Doak	87,274	39.1%
Mark Croucher	42,772	19.2%

Republican Runoff Primary

Candidate	Votes	Percentage
John P. Crawford	35,294	29.4%
John Doak	84,570	70.6%

=== General ===
Oklahoma insurance commissioner general election, 2010
Party	Candidate	Votes	%
Republican	John Doak	556,662	54.51
Democratic	Kim Holland (incumbent)	464,596	45.49
Total votes		1,021,258	100

== Corporation commissioner ==
The 2010 Corporation Commissioner election was for the seat currently held by incumbent Republican commissioner Dana Murphy, who won her primary election. As the Democratic Party did not field a candidate, and no independent candidate sought office, Murphy was thus elected as commissioner.

=== Candidates ===
Democrats

- none

Republicans

- Dana Murphy - incumbent Corporation Commissioner
- Tod Yeager - Del City resident

=== Primary ===
Republican

Candidate	Votes	Percentage
Tod Yeafer	70,651	30.8%
Dana Murphy	158,779	69.2%

=== General ===
Murphy did not have a Democratic or independent opponent; thus, she was elected unopposed.

== U.S. senator ==
The 2010 US senatorial election gave incumbent Republican senator Tom Coburn a second full term in office.

Candidate	Votes	%
Tom Coburn	718,482	70.64%
Jim Rogers	265,814	26.13%
Stephen Wallace	25,048	2.46%
Ronald F. Dwyer	7,807	0.77%

== U.S. representatives ==
All five Oklahoma seats in the United States House of Representatives were up for election in 2010. However, incumbent Tom Cole in District 4 had no opposition in the general election.

Candidate	Votes	%
District 1
John Sullivan	151,173	76.80%
Angelia O'Dell	45,656	23.20%
District 2
Dan Boren	108,203	56.52%
Charles Thompson	83,226	43.48%
District 3
Frank D. Lucas	161,927	77.99%
Frankie Robbins	45,689	22.01%
District 5
James Lankford	123,236	62.53%
Billy Coyle	68,074	34.53%
Clark Duffe	3,067	1.56%
Dave White	2,728	1.38%

== State senators ==
24 of the 48 seats in the Oklahoma Senate were up for election in 2010.

Candidate	Votes	%
District 4
Mark Allen	9,974	51.35%
Neil Brannon	9,451	48.65%
District 6
Josh Brecheen	11,719	56.76%
Jay Paul Gumm	8,925	43.24%
District 8
Roger Ballenger	10,564	53.82%
Jannica Edmonds	9,064	46.18%
District 10
Eddie Fields	14,324	62.37%
Dale Christenson, Jr.	8,641	37.63%
District 14
Frank Simpson	13,408	62.67%
Darryl Roberts	7,987	37.33%

Candidate	Votes	%
District 16
John Sparks	10,507	52.62%
Sharon Parker	9,460	47.38%
District 18
Kim David	13,334	65.89%
Janice Aldridge	6,902	34.11%
District 42
Cliff A Aldridge	14,954	68.33%
Mike Kelly	6,934	31.67%
District 44
Ralph Shortey	6,060	57.34%
Randy Rose	4,509	42.66%
District 46
Andrew Rice	7,548	68.28%
Joshua Jantz	3,507	31.72%

== State representatives ==
All 101 seats in the Oklahoma House of Representatives were up for election in 2010.

Candidate	Votes	%
District 1
Rusty Farley	4,118	50.83%
Dennis R. Bailey	3,984	49.17%
District 2
John R. Bennet	4,794	54.50%
Glen Bud Smithson	4,004	45.50%
District 3
James Lockhart	4,713	53.01%
Roger Mattox	4,178	46.99%
District 4
Mike Brown	5,555	63.00%
Dwayne Thompson	3,262	37.00%
District 9
Marty Quinn	9,914	74.42%
Eric Cullen	3,407	25.58%
District 10
Steve Martin	6,330	64.60%
Nick Brown	3,468	35.40%
District 15
Ed Cannaday	5,894	63.93%
Paul C. Parrott	3,325	36.07%
District 17
Brian Renegar	5,740	57.89%
Micah Thompson	4,176	42.11%
District 18
Donnie Condit	4,817	50.57%
Kyle Burmeier	4,708	49.43%
District 21
Dustin Roberts	4,965	51.76%
Nathan W. Williams	4,623	48.24%
District 22
Wes Hilliard	6,008	60.69%
Allie Burgin	3,894	39.31%
District 23
Sue Tibbs	4,801	67.61%
Mark W. Manley	2,300	32.39%
District 27
Josh Cockroft	5,667	59.79%
Chris Odneal	3,810	40.21%
District 28
Tom Newell	5,339	60.91%
Ed Smith	3,425	39.09%
District 29
Sky McNiel	7,942	78.28%
David W. Narcomey	2,203	21.72%
District 30
Mark E. McCullough	7,726	75.85%
Donna Marie Vogelpohl	2,460	24.15%
District 32
Danny Morgan	6,936	61.76%
John B. Husted	4,293	38.24%
District 34
Cory T. Williams	4,890	51.47%
Ryan Smith	4,610	48.53%
District 35
Dennis Casey	7,868	70.83%
Rodger Ensign	3,240	29.17%
District 36
Sean Roberts	5,912	55.86%
Greg Brown	4,671	44.14%
District 37
Steve Vaughan	5,028	52.58%
Ken Luttrell	4,534	47.42%
District 43
Colby Schwartz	10,491	81.43%
J.P. Hemminger	2,393	18.57%
District 44
Emily Virgin	5,577	63.63%
Kent Hunt	3,187	36.37%
District 45
Aaron Stiles	6,313	52.02%
Wallace Collins	5,823	47.98%

Candidate	Votes	%
District 46
Scott Martin	10,972	80.30%
Zachary Knight	2,692	19.70%
District 49
Tommy C. Hardin	5,237	50.17%
Samson R. Buck	5,201	49.83%
District 53
Randy Terrill	8,230	60.95%
Amy Corley	5,273	39.05%
District 56
Phil Richardson	7,173	73.91%
Maya Torralba	2,532	26.09%
District 58
Jeff Hickman	9,400	85.77%
Wilson John Adamson	1,559	14.23%
District 61
Gus Blackwell	6,518	76.99%
Stephen Skacall	1,948	23.01%
District 64
Ann Coody	4,577	76.16%
Michael J. Corrales	1,433	23.84%
District 66
Jadine Nollan	3,600	50.69%
Eli Potts	3,503	49.31%
District 68
Glen Mulready	6,768	67.99%
Seth Watkins	3,188	32.01%
District 71
Daniel S. Sullivan	5,774	59.63%
Jeff Tracy	3,910	40.37%
District 72
Seneca D Scott	3,326	75.85%
Mark Liotta	1,059	24.15%
District 78
Jeannie McDaniel	5,407	53.40%
Molly McKay	4,715	46.60%
District 84
Sally Kern	5,717	65.89%
Brittany M. Novotny	2,958	34.11%
District 85
David Dank	7,450	58.26%
Gail Vines	3,990	31.21%
Edward A. Shadid	1,346	10.53%
District 87
Jason Nelson	5,147	54.10%
Dana Orwig	4,369	45.90%
District 88
Al McAffrey	4,173	69.56%
Dominique DaMon Block, Sr.	1,826	30.44%
District 91
Mike Reynolds	10,197	74.70%
Hollis Harper	3,454	25.30%
District 93
Mike Christian	2,722	53.48%
Wanda Jo Peltier	2,184	44.52%
District 94
Scott Inman	4,814	59.68%
Kyle Coulter	3,252	40.32%
District 95
Charlie Joyner	5,481	65.47%
Michael A. Walker	2,891	34.53%
District 97
Mike Shelton	8,514	83.87%
Daniel N. Stankiewicz	1,638	16.13%
District 98
John Trebilcock	9,453	76.00%
Dennis W. Weese	2,987	24.00%
District 101
Gary Banz	7,896'	68.15%
Johnny Laudermilk	3,692	31.85%

== Judicial ==
These races were "retention" votes based on Oklahoma's use of the Missouri Plan for electing judicial nominees.

=== Oklahoma Supreme Court ===
Steven W. Taylor
Choice	Votes	%
For	575,570	64.88
Against	311,608	35.12
Total	887,178	100.00

Retention results by county Yes: 70–80%; 60–70%; 50–60%

James R. Winchester
Choice	Votes	%
For	571,893	65.02
Against	307,615	34.98
Total	879,508	100.00

Retention results by county Yes: 70–80%; 60–70%; 50–60%

=== Oklahoma Court of Civil Appeals ===
Deborah B. Barnes
Choice	Votes	%
For	565,390	64.11
Against	316,542	35.89
Total	881,932	100.00

Retention results by county Yes: 60–70%; 50–60%; No: 50–60%

Doug Gabbard II
Choice	Votes	%
For	539,326	61.60
Against	336,136	38.40
Total	875,462	100.00

Retention results by county Yes: 70–80%; 60–70%; 50–60%; No: 50–60%

John F. Fischer
Choice	Votes	%
For	549,756	62.74
Against	326,506	37.26
Total	876,262	100.00

Retention results by county Yes: 60–70%; 50–60%; No: 50–60%

Larry E. Joplin
Choice	Votes	%
For	548,247	62.46
Against	329,520	37.54
Total	877,767	100.00

Retention results by county Yes: 60–70%; 50–60%; No: 50–60%

== State questions ==
=== SQ 744 ===
State Question 744 would have amended the Oklahoma Constitution by adding a new article: Article 13-C - Amount of money the State provides to support common schools.

The proposed Constitutional amendment would have mandated that the Oklahoma Legislature spend no less than the average amount spent by "neighboring states" (those states which border Oklahoma: Missouri, Texas, Kansas, Arkansas, Colorado and New Mexico) on "common education" (defined as grades pre-kindergarten through high school) on an annual, per-student basis. If the surrounding-state average ever declined, the legislature would be required to spend the same amount as it did the year before. The measure required that increased spending begin in the first fiscal year after its passage and that the surrounding-state average be met in the third fiscal year after passage.

The proposed amendment did not provide a funding source for the new spending requirements and was therefore overwhelmingly defeated.

State Question 744
Choice	Votes	%
For	189,164	18.59
Against	828,589	81.41
Total	1,017,753	100.00

Question 744 results by county No: 90–100%; 80–90%; 70–80%; 60–70%

=== SQ 746 ===
State Question 746 would amend various State laws relating to voting requirements. It requires that each person appearing to vote present a document proving their identity. The document must meet the following requirements:

- It must have the name and photograph of the voter.
- It must have been issued by the federal, state or tribal government.
- It must have an expiration date that is after the date of the election.

No expiration date would be required on certain identity cards issued to person 65 years of age or older. In lieu of such a document, voters could present voter identification cards issued by the County Election Board. A person who cannot or does not present the required identification may sign a sworn statement and cast a provisional ballot. Swearing to a false statement would be a felony.

If approved, the measure would become effective July 1, 2011.

State Question 746
Choice	Votes	%
For	746,053	74.34
Against	257,523	25.66
Total	1,003,576	100.00

Question 746 results by county Yes: 80–90%; 70–80%; 60–70%

=== SQ 747 ===
State Question 747 would amend the Oklahoma Constitution by placing term limits on all Statewide elected officials. All officials would be allowed to serve no more two terms in office. Terms served need not be consecutive for the limits to apply.

State Question 747
Choice	Votes	%
For	695,592	69.88
Against	299,789	30.12
Total	995,381	100.00

Question 747 results by county Yes: 70–80%; 60–70%; 50–60%

=== SQ 748 ===
State Question 748 would amend the Oklahoma Constitution by amending Article 5, Sections 11A and 11B. The measure would change how the districts of the Oklahoma Legislature are apportioned.

Currently, the Apportionment Commission is responsible for setting district boundaries every ten years if the legislature itself fails to do so. The Apportionment Commission, as currently established, is composed of the attorney general, the state treasurer and the state superintendent of public instruction. The measure would change the commission's name to the Bipartisan Commission on Legislative Apportionment and would increase the number of members from three to seven. The president pro tempore of the Oklahoma Senate would appoint one Democrat and one Republican, the Speaker of the Oklahoma House of Representatives would appoint one Democrat and one Republican, and the governor of Oklahoma would appoint one Democrat and one Republican.

The lieutenant governor of Oklahoma would chair the commission and would be a nonvoting member. It requires orders of apportionment to be signed by at least four members of the commission.

State Question 748
Choice	Votes	%
For	567,288	58.42
Against	403,733	41.58
Total	971,021	100.00

Question 748 results by county Yes: 60–70%; 50–60%; No: 50–60%

=== SQ 750 ===
This measure would amend the Oklahoma Constitution by altering the initiative petitions and with referendum petitions process by changing the number of signatures required for such petitions.

The following voter signature requirements would apply:

- 8% must sign to propose law
- 15% must sign to propose to change the State Constitution.
- 5% must sign to order a referendum.

These percentages are based upon the State office receiving the most total votes at the last general election when the governor is on the ballot. The measure's basis does not use general elections with the president on the ballot. More votes are usually cast at presidential general elections. Thus, the measure would generally have a lowering effect on the number of required signatures.

State Question 750
Choice	Votes	%
For	485,703	50.40
Against	478,042	49.60
Total	963,745	100.00

Question 750 results by county Yes: 60–70%; 50–60%; No: 60–70%; 50–60%

=== SQ 751 ===
This measure would amend the Oklahoma Constitution by adding a new Article to the Constitution. That Article would deal with the State's official actions. It dictates the language to be used in taking official State actions must be the English language. However, it allows for Native American languages could also be used and, when Federal law so requires, other languages could also be used.

The term "official actions" is not defined. The Oklahoma Legislature could pass laws determining the application of the language requirements. No lawsuit based on State law could be brought on the basis of a State agency's failure to use a language other than English nor could such a lawsuit be brought against political subdivisions of the State.

State Question 751
Choice	Votes	%
For	740,918	75.54
Against	239,904	24.46
Total	980,822	100.00

Question 751 results by county Yes: 80–90%; 70–80%

=== SQ 752 ===
This measure would amend Section 3 of Article 7-B of the Oklahoma Constitution. The amendment adds two at-large members to the Oklahoma Judicial Nominating Commission. At-large members can come from any Oklahoma congressional district. The President Pro Tempore of the Oklahoma Senate would appoint one of the new at-large members and the Speaker of the Oklahoma House of Representatives would appoint the other. At-large members cannot be lawyers, can not have a lawyer in their immediate family. Nor can more than two at-large members be from the same political party. This would raise the total membership on the commission from 13 to 15.

State Question 752
Choice	Votes	%
For	606,805	62.83
Against	358,925	37.17
Total	965,730	100.00

Question 752 results by county Yes: 70–80%; 60–70%; 50–60%

=== SQ 754 ===
This measure would have added a new section, Section 55A of Article 5, to the Oklahoma Constitution. Under the measure, the Constitution could not have required the Oklahoma Legislature to fund state functions based on:

1. Predetermined constitutional formulas,
2. How much other states spend on a function,
3. How much any entity spends on a function.

Under the measure, these limits on the Constitution's power to control appropriations would have applied even if:

1. A later constitutional amendment changed the Constitution, or
2. A constitutional amendment to the contrary was passed at the same time as this measure.

The Question was in direct opposition toward State Question 744 which also appeared on the ballot.

State Question 754
Choice	Votes	%
For	361,907	37.08
Against	614,219	62.92
Total	976,126	100.00

Question 754 results by county No: 60–70%; 50–60%; Yes: 50–60%; Tie: 50%

=== SQ 755 ===
This measure amended the Constitution of Oklahoma. It requires courts to rely solely on federal and state law when deciding cases. It forbids courts from considering or using international law or using Sharia.

The results of State Question 755 have not been officially certified by the Oklahoma Election Board due to an injunction filed in Federal Court by the Council on American–Islamic Relations (CAIR). CAIR is challenging its constitutionality under the Establishment Clause and Free Exercise Clause of the Constitution of the United States. A Federal District Court in Oklahoma City temporarily blocked certification of the election results, calling the measure an unconstitutional violation of the First Amendment because the measure conveys a message that the state favors one religion or particular belief. The state election board appealed the ruling to the Tenth Circuit Court of Appeals, but that court unanimously upheld the ruling blocking the amendment:

The US Court of Appeals for the Tenth Circuit on January 10, 2012 unanimously upheld a ruling blocking the implementation of an Oklahoma constitutional amendment that would have prohibited state courts from considering Islamic and international law in deciding cases. Approved by approximately 70 percent of Oklahoma voters, but challenged by the American Civil Liberties Union (ACLU) and the Council on American–Islamic Relations (CAIR), State Question 755, also called the “Save Our State Amendment,” was classified by the court as singling out Islam for unfavorable treatment in state courts. The court ruled that the provision likes [sic] violates the Establishment Clause of the First Amendment.

State Question 755
Choice	Votes	%
For	695,650	70.08
Against	296,944	29.92
Total	992,594	100.00

Question 755 results by county Yes: 80–90%; 70–80%; 60–70%

=== SQ 756 ===
This measure adds a new section, Section 37 to Article 2, of Oklahoma Constitution. It defines "health care system." It prohibits making a person participate in a health care system, prohibits making an employer participate in a health care system, and prohibits making a health care provider provide treatment in a health care system. It would allow persons and employees to pay for treatment directly, it would allow health care provider to accept payment for treatment directly, it would allow the purchase of health care insurance in private health care systems and it would allow the sale of health insurance in private health care systems.

The Question was proposed as an opposition toward the Patient Protection and Affordable Care Act.

State Question 756
Choice	Votes	%
For	638,530	64.73
Against	347,956	35.27
Total	986,486	100.00

Question 756 results by county Yes: 80–90%; 70–80%; 60–70%; 50–60%

=== SQ 757 ===
This measure amends Section 23 of Article 10 of the Oklahoma Constitution. It would increase the amount of surplus revenue which goes into the Constitutional Reserve Fund. The amount would go from 10% to 15% of the funds certified as going to the General Revenue fund for the preceding fiscal year.

State Question 757
Choice	Votes	%
For	499,287	51.02
Against	479,353	48.98
Total	978,640	100.00

Question 757 results by county Yes: 60–70%; 50–60%; No: 60–70%; 50–60%

== See also ==
- Government of Oklahoma
- Oklahoma House of Representatives
- Oklahoma Senate
- Politics of Oklahoma
- Oklahoma Congressional Districts
