= 2010 Oklahoma State Question 755 =

State Question 755
- Save Our State Amendment

Results
Choice	Votes	%
Yes	695,650	70.08%
No	296,944	29.92%
Total votes	992,594	100.00%
- County results Yes 80–90% 70–80% 60–70%

State Question 755, also known as the Save Our State Amendment, was a legislatively-referred ballot measure held in the U.S. state of Oklahoma on November 2, 2010, as part of the 2010 Oklahoma elections. The ballot measure was intended to amend the Oklahoma state constitution to ban the use of Sharia law (law derived from Islamic scripture), and international law (such as international agreements and treaties), from being used by courts within the state. Sharia law had not previously been used in Oklahoma, with the ballot measure being promoted as a "pre-emptive strike".

The ballot measure was used by conservatives in the state to motivate their base and increase their voter turnout. The ballot measure passed with over 70% of the vote, and Oklahoma Republicans defeated many Democrats in the simultaneous state elections, especially in rural areas. However, despite its electoral victory, the ballot measure never went into effect. Soon after the amendment passed, Muneer Awad, a local member of the Council on American–Islamic Relations, filed a federal lawsuit claiming the amendment violated his rights under the Establishment Clause. A federal court agreed and struck down the amendment. Continued legislative efforts in 2011 and 2012 to introduce a similar amendment were unsuccessful.

== Background ==
Following the September 11 attacks in 2001, anti-Muslim sentiment became more common in the United States. Sharia law, derived from Islam, came under increasing scrutiny, especially as Sharia law as practiced in many countries authorizes severe punishments for acts such as adultery and the consumption of alcohol. However, Sharia law can exist as a source of ethical inspiration for individual Muslims, in line with the Quran, and applying Sharia principles for that purpose does not necessarily entail a radical legal system. In 2010, Muslims were a small share of the state's population, with the Oklahoma Council on American–Islamic Relations estimating that between 15,000 and 30,000 Muslims lived in the state.

A few cases in the 2000s in the United States where Sharia law played some role were also cited by opponents of Sharia law. Most famously, in 2010, a woman in New Jersey was denied a restraining order against her husband after she alleged that he raped her; her husband argued that he was acting in accordance with his religious beliefs in forcing her to have sex. This ruling was issued even though there was sufficient evidence present to prove sexual assault. The ruling was quickly overturned, but it gained significant national attention, and inspired Oklahoma lawmakers to pursue a ban on the use of Sharia law in their state. After the amendment passed, Oklahoma's solicitor general, Patrick R. Wyrick, cited this case as part of his attempt to defend the amendment in court.

Democrat yea
Democrat nay
Democrat excused (not voting)
Republican yea
Republican excused (not voting)

=== Legislative history ===
The amendment was introduced as House Joint Resolution 1056 in the Oklahoma House of Representatives. State Representative Rex Duncan was the primary author of the amendment, with Mike Reynolds, Ann Coody, Sue Tibbs, David Derby, Sally Kern, Randy Terrill, John Enns, Mike Christian, George Faught, Lewis H. Moore, and Charles Key as coauthors in the House, and with Anthony Sykes and Randy Brogdon as coauthors in the Oklahoma Senate. Duncan argued the ban would be a "pre-emptive strike against Sharia law" as Oklahoma would be the first state to enact such a ban. Sykes also brought up comments Elena Kagan made during her Supreme Court nomination where she expressed an openness to considering international law while hearing cases.

The resolution was first voted on in the House on March 10, 2010, passing 91–2 on its third reading, with 8 absences. The measure then passed the Senate on April 20 by a margin of 40–5, with 3 absences. The resolution went back to the House for its fourth reading on May 18, where it passed 82–10, with 9 absences; it was again approved by the Senate on May 24 by a margin of 41–2, with 5 absences.

== Contents ==
The state legislature named the proposal the "Save Our State Amendment" and sent it to the state's ballots with the following ballot title:

This measure amends the State Constitution. It would change a section that deals with the courts of this state. It would make courts rely on federal and state laws when deciding cases. It would forbid courts from looking at international law or Sharia Law when deciding cases.

The proposal would add the following text to the Section 1 of Article VII of the state constitution:

The Courts provided for in subsection A of this section, when exercising their judicial authority, shall uphold and adhere to the law as provided in the United States Constitution, the Oklahoma Constitution, the United States Code, federal regulations promulgated pursuant thereto, established common law, the Oklahoma Statutes and rules promulgated pursuant thereto, and if necessary the law of another state of the United States provided the law of the other state does not include Sharia Law, in making judicial decisions. The courts shall not look to the legal precepts of other nations or cultures. Specifically, the courts shall not consider international law or Sharia Law. The provisions of this subsection shall apply to all cases before the respective courts including, but not limited to, cases of first impression.

However, as the ballot title did not explain what Sharia law or international law were, Oklahoma attorney general Drew Edmondson deemed it inadequate and replaced it with a more explanatory ballot title. In Oklahoma, ballot titles are legally significant: ambiguity in ballot language can lead to amendments being struck down or otherwise litigated in state courts even if the text added to the state constitution is unambiguous. The proposal was therefore listed on ballots as follows:

This measure amends the State Constitution. It changes a section that deals with the courts of this state. It would amend Article 7, Section 1. It makes courts rely on federal and state law when deciding cases. It forbids courts from considering or using international law. It forbids courts from considering or using Sharia Law. International law is also known as the law of nations. It deals with the conduct of international organizations and independent nations, such as countries, states and tribes. It deals with their relationship with each other. It also deals with some of their relationships with persons.

The law of nations is formed by the general assent of civilized nations. Sources of international law also include international agreements, as well as treaties.

Sharia Law is Islamic law. It is based on two principal sources, the Koran and the teaching of Mohammed.

On August 9, governor Brad Henry officially placed the amendment on statewide ballots with the rewritten title. The amendment was numbered and listed on ballots as State Question 755 and as Legislative Referendum 355.

== Support and opposition ==
The amendment was supported by most legislators, with only ten in the House and two in the Senate voting against the measure. All opponents in the House were Democrats, though 24 Democrats in the House supported the measure. (Note: The ten opponents were Wallace Collins, Ryan Kiesel, Al McAffrey, Anastasia Pittman, Wade Rousselot, Seneca Scott, Mike Shelton, Ben Sherrer, Jabar Shumate, and Cory T. Williams.) ACT for America, a conservative advocacy group led by activist Brigitte Gabriel, strongly supported the measure, with Gabriel visiting the state to make multiple speeches in favor of the amendment. The group's campaign efforts also included a minute-long radio ad – which cited the New Jersey rape case as a "chilling example of how Islamic Sharia law has begun to penetrate America", and robocalls from former CIA director James Woolsey. The Tulsa Beacon, a conservative newspaper, endorsed the measure.

Democratic state representative Cory Williams, one of the opponents of the measure, argued that it was unnecessary and singled out Muslims. Chris White, the executive director of governmental affairs of the Osage Nation, expressed concerns that the measure could undermine treaty rights established in U.S.–Native American treaties. Several religious groups also opposed the measure, with Saad Mohammed, the director of information for the Islamic Society of Greater Oklahoma City, arguing that the measure was unnecessary and only targeted Muslims without a good reason.

Many newspapers in the state opposed the measure. The Oklahoman opposed the amendment, describing it as an unnecessary "feel-good measure". The Enid News & Eagle similarly opposed it, noting that state and federal law is already the only law used in Oklahoma. Tulsa World described the measure as bigoted, and The Oklahoma Daily described it as Islamophobic.

== Polling ==
SoonerPoll conducted polling on State Question 755, as well as other state questions, in July and October. Each poll found the measure leading by a significant margin.

Poll source	Dates administered	Sample size	Margin of error	Support Question 755	Oppose Question 755	Don't know/refused (Note: Some polling results do not add up to 100% due to rounding.)	Lead
SoonerPoll	October 18–23, 2010	753 (LV)	± 3.57%	57%	24%	19%	33pp
SoonerPoll	October 3–7, 2010	352 (LV)	± 5.2%	45%	25%	30%	20pp
SoonerPoll	July 16–21, 2010	755 (LV)	± 3.57%	49%	24%	27%	25pp

== Results ==
The amendment was approved by 70% of voters. Support was high across the state, with more than 60% of voters supporting it in every county.

The referendum, held alongside the other 2010 Oklahoma elections on November 2, was used as a wedge issue by Republicans in some races. Republicans campaigned against Cory Williams, a prominent opponent of the measure in the Oklahoma House, by sending out mail advertisements suggesting he supported using Islamic law in the state. The referendum also succeeded in driving high Republican turnout, leading to many statewide and downballot victories, especially against more conservative Democrats from rural areas. Other conservative-aligned ballot measures also passed, including State Question 751, making English the state's official language.

Question 755
Choice	Votes	%
For	695,650	70.08
Against	296,944	29.92
Total	992,594	100.00

== Aftermath ==
Despite passing by a wide margin, the amendment never took effect due to legal challenges. Further efforts to pass a similar amendment were unsuccessful.

=== Court proceedings ===
After its passage, the amendment was scheduled to go into effect on November 9, when the election would be certified. However, on November 4, Muneer Awad, a local leader of the Council on American–Islamic Relations, sued the Oklahoma State Election Board to stop the amendment from being enacted. He said that he wanted his estate to be dealt with under Islamic law, and that a ban on Islamic law would therefore violate his rights under the Establishment Clause of the First Amendment to the United States Constitution. The case, Awad v. Ziriax, was filed against the state's election board as it was the entity responsible for certifying the results of the amendment. Awad was supported in his lawsuit by the American Civil Liberties Union.

A temporary restraining order was issued on November 9, preventing the amendment from going into effect while the court ruled on Awad's request for a preliminary injunction. (Note: Awad v. Ziriax, 754 F. Supp. 2d 1298 (W.D. Okla. 2010).) Vicki Miles-LaGrange, a judge for the United States District Court for the Western District of Oklahoma, issued a preliminary injunction on November 29, 2010. The injunction was appealed to the United States Court of Appeals for the Tenth Circuit, where it was upheld on January 10, 2012. (Note: Awad v. Ziriax, 670 F.3d 1111 (10th Cir. 2012).) The amendment was struck down in its entirety by Miles-LaGrange on August 15, 2013, with her finding that the law clearly violated the First Amendment. (Note: Awad v. Ziriax, 966 F. Supp. 2d 1198 (W.D. Okla. 2013).) Oklahoma officials argued that only the Sharia prohibition in the law could be struck down, while leaving the rest intact, but Miles-LaGrange found that as most campaigning regarding the amendment focused on Sharia law, there was insufficient evidence that it would have been approved by voters without the Sharia prohibitions.

=== Legal analysis and impact ===
For a preliminary injunction to be issued, the district court determined that three things would be necessary: Awad would need to have a "substantial likelihood of success" in challenging the amendment on constitutional grounds, he would need to be likely to suffer "irreparable injury" without an injunction, his injury would need to outweigh the injury that an injunction would impose on the state of Oklahoma, and the injunction could not be against the public interest. Given that Awad's request for a preliminary injunction would permanently prevent the enactment of the amendment, it was considered "disfavored" and held to a higher standard: he needed to show a "heightened burden" and a higher likelihood of success in challenging the amendment on its constitutional merits compared to what would typically be necessary. The district court then evaluated the Establishment Clause claims with the three-pronged Lemon test. (Note: The Lemon test, from the case Lemon v. Kurtzman (1971), requires the following: that the legislation has a secular purpose, that its primary purpose or effect not be to advance or inhibit religion, and that the legislation must not result in "excessive government entanglement" with religion. Only legislation that is in accordance with all three prongs is constitutionally valid.) The court found that the amendment likely violated both the "effect" and "entanglement" prongs of the Lemon test. The court also determined that the amendment likely violated the Free Exercise Clause, as it was not "narrowly-tailored" to a particular governmental interest and it was not facially neutral as it singled-out a particular religion for discrimination. The court also determined, without going into much detail, that Awad had demonstrated "irreparable injury", that the harm done to him by the violation of his constitutional rights was inherently more important than enacting the amendment, and that upholding Awad's constitutional rights was inherently in the public interest. Given these determinations, the court ruled in favor of Awad, enjoining the amendment from taking effect.

Though the Tenth Circuit upheld the district court's ruling in the case, their legal reasoning was quite different. The court agreed that the injunction should be considered "disfavored" and held to a higher standard. It also agreed that Awad had demonstrated that he would suffer irreparable injury, that this outweighed Oklahoma's potential injury, and that the injunction was not in conflict with the public interest. However, their ruling regarding whether Awad had a high chance of winning the case on its constitutional merits was different. It generally ignored the Free Exercise claim, as they determined its analysis to be unnecessary as the law was in violation of the Establishment Clause. In that analysis, the court rejected the use of the Lemon test and instead invoked a test from Larson v. Valente (1982), a case cited much less frequently. The court determined that Lemon applied only to laws that would benefit all religions, not to laws that would discriminate between different religions. Because the amendment focused on Sharia law, it could, per the test in Larson, only be constitutional if it was "closely fitted" to address a compelling governmental interest. Given that the Election Board had failed to demonstrate any cases where Sharia law was actually used, the court determined that there clearly was no compelling governmental interest at play. Even if such cases did exist, a full ban on Sharia law would likely not be a "closely fitted" remedy.

In the Denver University Law Review, Renee Sheeder described the amendment as "blatantly unconstitutional" as well as harmful to Oklahomans. In particular, state law cannot ban international law, as the federal government is authorized to enter into treaties that bind states. The amendment's strict bans on Sharia and international law would also prevent Oklahoma courts from considering decisions or referencing judgements courts in other states had made if those decisions had at all been influenced by Sharia or international law, potentially causing problems for dealing with cross-state disputes. She attributed the amendment's large margin of victory to a fear of Islam that was promoted by Republican politicians in the state, and praised the court for upholding the rights of religious minorities.

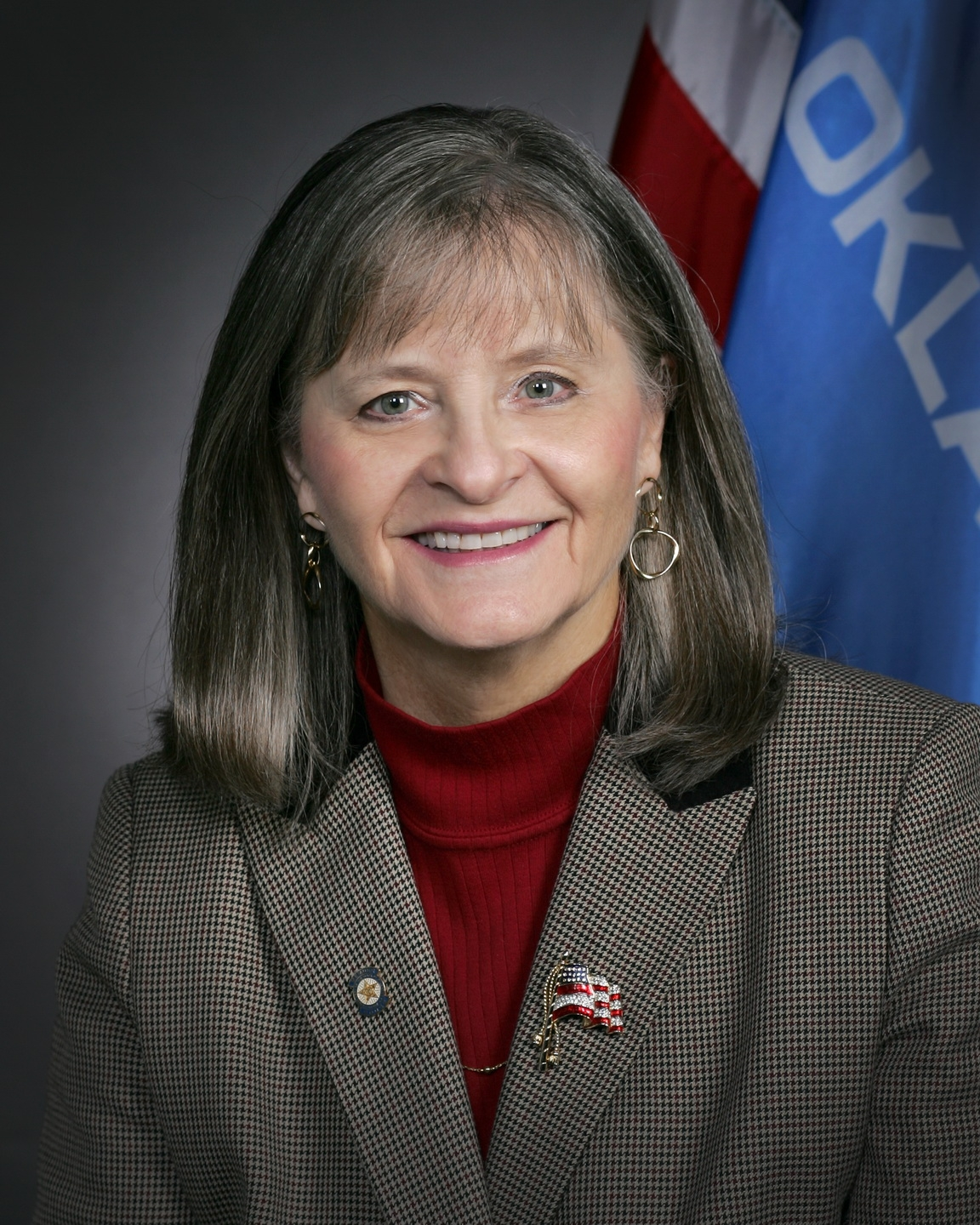
Sally Kern (2011 official portrait). Kern attempted to pass a modified version of the amendment in 2011 and in 2012, but both of her bills died in the legislature.

=== Continued legislative efforts ===
Following initial legal challenges to the amendment, Sally Kern, a Republican member of the Oklahoma House, introduced House Bill 1552 in 2011. The bill intended to work around legal challenges by banning all religious and foreign law from being used in the state. The Oklahoma Council on American–Islamic Relations lobbied against this bill, arguing that it infringes on religious freedom and also threatens the validity of international business contracts. The measure passed by a 76–3 margin in the House, but did not progress in the Senate. She reintroduced the bill in 2012, where it again passed the House, but was rejected 6–9 in the Senate's rules committee.
