= Steve Burrage =

American politician (1952–2025)

11th Oklahoma State Auditor and Inspector
- In office July 10, 2008 – January 10, 2011
- Appointed by: Brad Henry
- Preceded by: Jeff McMahan
- Succeeded by: Gary Jones

Oklahoma Tax Commissioner
- In office February 1, 2015 – April 22, 2016
- Preceded by: Jerry Johnson

Personal details
- Born: July 7, 1952 Durant, Oklahoma, U.S.
- Died: June 8, 2025 (aged 72)
- Party: Democratic
- Relations: Michael Burrage (brother); Sean Burrage (nephew)
- Education: University of Oklahoma

Steve Burrage (July 7, 1952 – June 8, 2025) was an American politician from Oklahoma and the Chairman of the Oklahoma Tax Commission. Burrage served as Oklahoma State Auditor and Inspector upon his appointment to that post by Governor Brad Henry on July 10, 2008, filling the vacancy created by the resignation of former state auditor Jeff McMahan. Burrage served until his defeat in the 2010 general election by Republican Gary Jones.

== Background ==
Steve Burrage was born in Durant, Oklahoma. A member of the Choctaw Nation, he is the brother of former U.S. District Court judge, Michael Burrage, and the uncle of former Oklahoma state senator, Sean Burrage. In 1975, he earned a bachelor's degree in accounting from the University of Oklahoma. Following his graduation from college, he attained licensure as a certified public accountant in Oklahoma. He began his professional career as a partner in the C.P.A. firm of Burgess and Burrage from 1977 to 1982. In 1982, he joined FirstBank of Antlers, Oklahoma, serving as president and CEO from then until 1984, when he assumed additional duties as chairman of the board. He served as president until 1990, as CEO until 2005, and as chairman of the board until 2008.

Burrage died on June 8, 2025, at the age of 72.

== Political career ==
Upon accepting his appointment as state auditor and inspector, Burrage announced that he would seek a full term in the 2010 election if he felt he had had success. In that election, he was defeated by Republican Gary Jones.

Burrage's office audited the Wagoner, Oklahoma school district and identified $270,000 missing from the district's child nutrition program from 2005 to 2009.

Following completion of his service as state auditor and inspector in January, 2011, he re-joined FirstBank as chairman of the board, and was a former board member of the Oklahoma Policy Institute. In June, 2012, he was appointed to the Oklahoma Board of Corrections by Governor Mary Fallin.

In January 2015, Governor Mary Fallin named Burrage to serve on the Oklahoma Tax Commission to succeed Jerry Johnson, who was retiring. Fallin also named Burrage as the Chairman of the Commission in July 2015. He resigned in April 2016.

Party political offices
Preceded by Jeff McMahan	Democratic nominee for Auditor of Oklahoma; 2010	Most recent
Political offices
Preceded by Jeff McMahan	Oklahoma State Auditor and Inspector; July, 2008 - January, 2011	Succeeded by Gary Jones
