= Jeff McMahan =

Jeff McMahan may refer to:

- Jeff McMahan (politician), American politician, resigned 2008 for accepting improper cash and gifts
- Jeff McMahan (philosopher) (born 1954), American moral philosopher
