= Owen Laughlin =

American politician

Member of the Oklahoma Senate
- In office November 2001 – November 2008
- Preceded by: Wayne Winn (Note: The 27th district was abolished between the 38th Oklahoma Legislature and the 48th Oklahoma Legislature. Wayne Winn last represented the district in the 38th Legislature.)
- Succeeded by: Bryce Marlatt
- In office November 1996 – November 2001
- Preceded by: Don Williams
- Succeeded by: District abolished (Note: The 49th district was abolished in 2001 and has not been recreated since.)
- Constituency: 49th district (1996-2001); 27th district (2001-2008)

Personal details
- Party: Republican

Owen Laughlin is an American politician who served in the Oklahoma Senate representing the 49th district from 1996 to 2001 and the 27th district from 2001 to 2008.

== Biography ==
Owen Laughlin was elected to the Oklahoma Senate as a Republican representing the 49th district in 1996, succeeding Democrat Don Williams. In 2001, he was redistricted to the 27th district. He served in office until term limited in 2008. He ran for Oklahoma State Treasurer in the 2010 Oklahoma elections.
