= Bryce Marlatt =

American politician

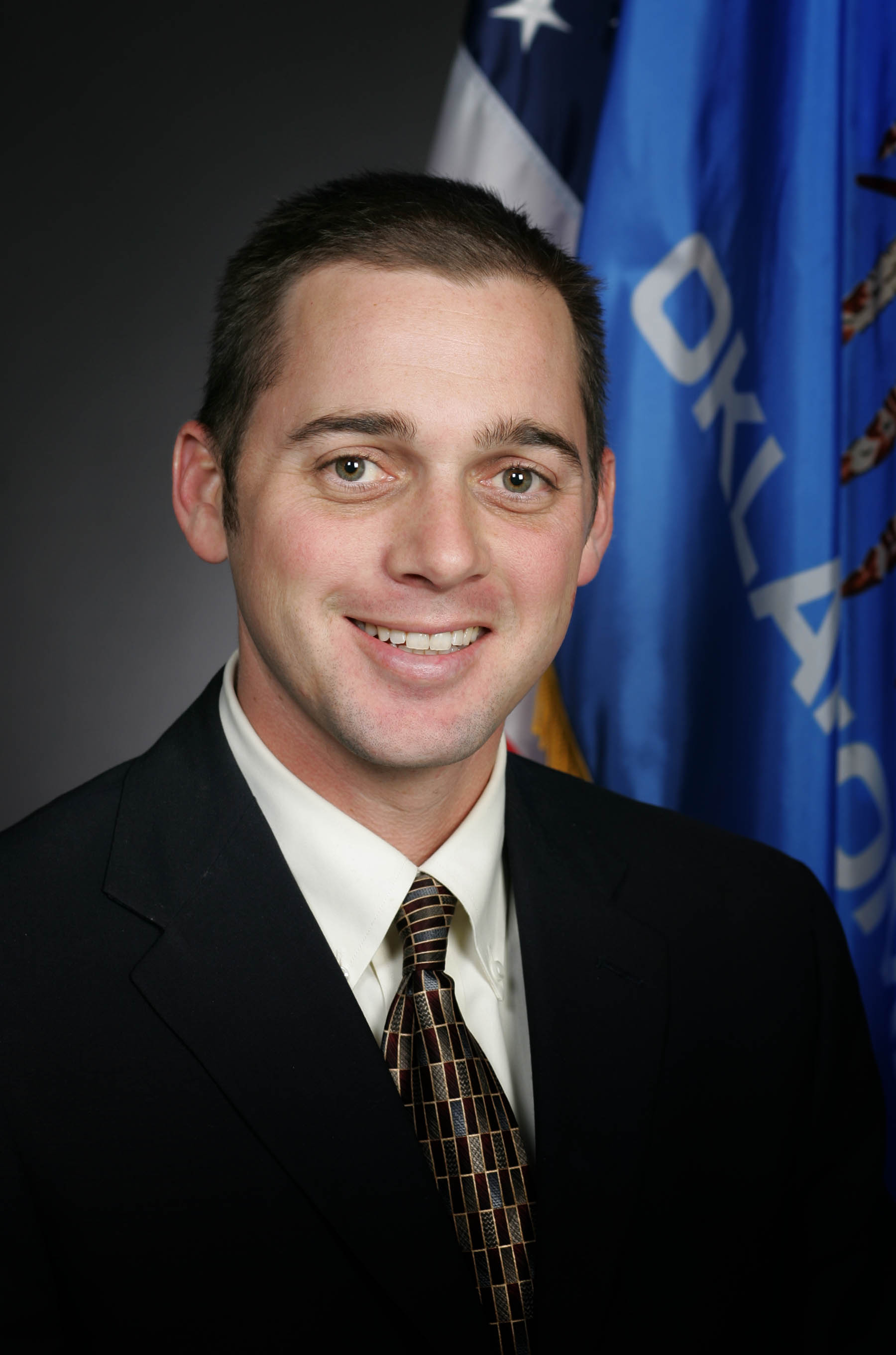

Member of the Oklahoma Senate from the 27th district
- In office January 6, 2009 – September 12, 2017
- Preceded by: Owen Laughlin
- Succeeded by: Casey Murdock

Personal details
- Born: Anthony Bryce Marlatt; March 29, 1977 (age 49) Shattuck, Oklahoma, U.S.
- Party: Republican
- Spouse: Tatum
- Children: 3
- Education: Northwestern Oklahoma State University

Anthony Bryce Marlatt (born March 29, 1977) is an American Republican politician who served in the Oklahoma Senate from 2009 until his resignation in 2017.

== Biography ==
Marlatt was born in Shattuck, Oklahoma. He graduated from Northwestern Oklahoma State University in 2003. Marlatt previously worked as a staff member for Representative Frank Lucas and Senator Jim Inhofe.

In 2004, he unsuccessfully ran for the Oklahoma House of Representatives, losing in the Republican primary. He ran for the Senate in 2008 and won; being reelected in 2012 and 2016.

In 2013, Marlatt was named the Oklahoma Independent Petroleum Association's "Legislator of the Year".

Marlatt was elected Majority Caucus Chair in 2014. He was elected Assistant Majority Floor Leader in 2016.

== Legal issues ==
In December 2014, Marlatt was arrested on suspicion of driving under the influence. In June 2015, he pleaded no contest and was sentenced to probation, along with a one-year deferred sentence.

In July 2017, Marlatt was accused of "forcefully grabbing an Uber driver and kissing her neck on June 26 while she drove him to a hotel".

In September 2017, Marlatt was charged with felony sexual battery. After being charged, he resigned from the Senate.

At trial, he pled guilty. In a plea bargain, was sentenced to 90 days probation, fined $500, and paid $50 to the victims compensation fund plus court costs.

== Personal life ==
Marlatt and his wife, Tatum, have 4 children.

== Electoral history ==
Oklahoma House District 58 Republican primary, 2004
Party	Candidate	Votes	%
Republican	Jeff W. Hickman	2,636	53.68
Republican	Bryce Marlatt	2,275	46.33
Total votes		4,911	100.00

Oklahoma Senate District 27 Republican primary, 2008
Party	Candidate	Votes	%
Republican	Bryce Marlatt	4,577	75.90
Republican	Kevin Evans	1,453	24.10
Total votes		6,030	100.00

Oklahoma Senate District 27 election, 2008
Party	Candidate	Votes	%
Republican	Bryce Marlatt	18,897	68.32
Democratic	Bowdy E. Peach	8,762	31.68
Total votes		27,659	100.00

Oklahoma Senate District 27 Republican primary, 2012
Party	Candidate	Votes	%
Republican	Bryce Marlatt	Unopposed	100.00
Total votes		Unopposed	100.00

Oklahoma Senate District 27 election, 2012
Party	Candidate	Votes	%
Republican	Bryce Marlatt	23,226	84.46
Independent	Tommy W. Nicholson	4,273	15.54
Total votes		27,499	100.00

Oklahoma Senate District 27 Republican primary, 2016
Party	Candidate	Votes	%
Republican	Bryce Marlatt	6,430	70.34
Republican	Tommy W. Nicholson	2,712	29.67
Total votes		9,142	100.00

Oklahoma Senate District 27 election, 2016
Party	Candidate	Votes	%
Republican	Bryce Marlatt	Unopposed	100.00
Total votes		Unopposed	100.00
