= 2004 Oklahoma elections =

2004 state government elections in Oklahoma, United States of America

- November 2, 2004

The Oklahoma state elections were held on November 2, 2004. The primary election was held on July 27. The runoff primary election was held on August 24.

== Overview ==
Executive branch before election

Office	Current officer	Party
Governor	Brad Henry	Democratic
Lieutenant Governor	Mary Fallin	Republican
State Auditor and Inspector	Jeff McMahan	Democratic
Attorney General	Drew Edmondson	Democratic
State Treasurer	Scott Meacham	Democratic
State School Superintendent	Sandy Garrett	Democratic
Labor Commissioner	Brenda Reneau	Republican
Insurance Commissioner	Kim Holland	Democratic
Corporation Commissioner	Bob Anthony	Republican

Legislature before election

House	Democrats	Republicans
Oklahoma Senate	28	20
Oklahoma House of Representatives	53	48

Executive branch after election

Office	Current officer	Party
Governor	Brad Henry	Democratic
Lieutenant Governor	Mary Fallin	Republican
State Auditor and Inspector	Jeff McMahan	Democratic
Attorney General	Drew Edmondson	Democratic
State Treasurer	Scott Meacham	Democratic
State School Superintendent	Sandy Garrett	Democratic
Labor Commissioner	Brenda Reneau	Republican
Insurance Commissioner	Kim Holland	Democratic
Corporation Commissioner	Bob Anthony	Republican

Legislature after election

House	Democrats	Republicans
Oklahoma Senate	26	22
Oklahoma House of Representatives	44	57

=== Primary election ===
The candidates for the parties faced on in the primary election on July 25. If no party received more than 50% of the vote, a runoff election was held on August 22 to decide the winner.

== Corporation Commissioner elections ==
Candidate	Votes	%
John Wylie	489,759	36.36%
Denise Bode	857,387	63.64%

== U.S. representatives ==
Candidate	Votes	%
District 1
John Sullivan	187,145	60.19%
Doug Dodd	116,731	37.54%
John Krymski	7,058	2.27%
District 2
Dan Boren	179,579	65.89%
Wayland Smalley	92,963	34.11%
District 3
Frank Lucas	215,510	82.21%
Gregory M. Wilson	46,621	17.79%
District 4
Tom Cole	198,985	77.77%
Charlene Bradshaw	56,869	22.23%
District 5
Ernest Istook	180,430	66.06%
Bert Smith	92,719	37.30%

== See also ==
- Government of Oklahoma
- Oklahoma House of Representatives
- Oklahoma Senate
- Politics of Oklahoma
- Oklahoma's congressional districts
