= Oklahoma Policy Institute =

American-based think tank

- Institute Logo
- Established: 2008
- Executive Director: Shiloh Kantz
- Staff: 20
- Budget: Revenue: $792,306; Expenses: $733,054 (FYE December 2015)
- Slogan: Better Information, Better Policy
- Address: 907 S Detroit Ave, Suite 1005, Tulsa, OK 74120
- Location: Tulsa, Oklahoma
- Website: www.okpolicy.org

The Oklahoma Policy Institute (OK Policy) is an independent nonpartisan think tank focused on state policy issues. Its primary office is located in Tulsa, Oklahoma, but has staff statewide.

== Founding and mission ==
OK Policy was founded in 2008 by David Blatt, Vincent LoVoi, and Steven Dow. It grew out of the public policy department of the Community Action Project of Tulsa County, where Blatt had been director of public policy. Blatt began his tenure at OK Policy as director of policy. In 2010, Blatt replaced Matt Guillory as executive director, and the organization's main office was moved from Oklahoma City, Oklahoma, to Tulsa. In 2012, Oklahoma Policy Institute hired an Outreach Coordinator. In 2019, Ahniwake Rose became the executive director. In 2022, the organization's longest-serving employee Shiloh Kantz was named executive director.

The organization's mission is to advance equitable and fiscally responsible policies that expand opportunity for all Oklahomans through non-partisan research, analysis, and advocacy.

== Collaborations and Affiliations ==
Oklahoma Policy Institute is affiliated with two networks of state policy research organizations. The first is the State Priorities Partnership (SPP), a collaboration coordinated by the Center on Budget and Policy Priorities. The second is the Economic Analysis Research Network (EARN), coordinated by the Economic Policy Institute.

== Involvement in Income Tax Debate, 2012 ==
In 2012, members of the Oklahoma Republican Party in the Oklahoma Legislature began advocating a decrease in, or abolition of, the income tax. OK Policy helped form a coalition of stakeholders that would be impacted by income tax cuts. Stakeholders included the Oklahoma Education Association, The Oklahoma State School Boards Association, and The Oklahoma Institute for Child Advocacy. This group was called Together Oklahoma.

OK Policy advocated against the income tax cut, while Oklahoma Council of Public Affairs advocated for the cut.
