= Gary Jones (Oklahoma politician) =

American politician

Oklahoma State Auditor and Inspector
- In office January 10, 2011 – January 14, 2019
- Governor: Mary Fallin
- Preceded by: Steve Burrage
- Succeeded by: Cindy Byrd

Chair of the Oklahoma Republican Party
- In office April 14, 2007 – June 26, 2010
- Preceded by: Tom Daxon
- Succeeded by: Matt Pinnell
- In office 2003–2006
- Preceded by: Chad Alexander
- Succeeded by: Tom Daxon

Personal details
- Born: 1954 (age 71–72) Fort Sill, Oklahoma, US
- Party: Republican
- Education: Cameron University (BS)

Gary Jones is a United States businessman and Republican politician from Oklahoma. He is the former Oklahoma State Auditor and Inspector.

== Personal ==
Jones was born in Fort Sill, Oklahoma, the fifth of seven children. He graduated from Cameron University in 1978 with a Bachelor of Business Administration/Accounting degree. Jones is both a certified public accountant and a certified fraud examiner.

While in college, Jones worked for Southwestern Bell. After 10 years Jones left to start his own telecommunications company, which he sold 16 years later. Jones has operated a cow-calf operation for over 30 years in addition to his other ventures.

In 1994 Jones successfully ran for Comanche County Commissioner, a seat he held for four years.

Prior to his successful 2010 bid for State Auditor and Inspector, Jones unsuccessfully sought the office in both 2002 and 2006, losing both times to Jeff McMahan.

In 2003 he was named chairman and Executive Director of the Oklahoma Republican Party and held the office longer than anyone prior, until resigning to make his successful bid for State Auditor and Inspector.

In 2017, Gary Jones announced he would be a Republican candidate for Governor of Oklahoma in 2018. Gary Jones placed 5th in a 10-man primary that was held on June 26, 2018. He received almost 6% of the vote.

== Electoral history ==
Republican primary results
Party	Candidate	Votes	%
Republican	Mick Cornett	132,806	29.3
Republican	Kevin Stitt	110,479	24.4
Republican	Todd Lamb	107,985	23.9
Republican	Dan Fisher	35,818	7.9
Republican	Gary Jones	25,243	5.6
Republican	Gary Richardson	18,185	4.0
Republican	Blake Stephens	12,211	2.7
Republican	Christopher Barnett	5,240	1.2
Republican	Barry Gowdy	2,347	0.5
Republican	Eric Foutch	2,292	0.5
Total votes		452,606	100.0

Oklahoma Auditor and Inspector Election, 2002
Party	Candidate	Votes	%
Democratic	Jeff McMahan	516,425	51.43
Republican	Gary Jones	487,646	48.57

Oklahoma Auditor and Inspector Election, 2006
Party	Candidate	Votes	%
Democratic	Jeff McMahan (inc.)	469,311	51.68
Republican	Gary Jones	438,778	48.32

Oklahoma Auditor and Inspector Republican primary election, 2010
Party	Candidate	Votes	%
Republican	Gary Jones	151,712	69.57
Republican	David Hanigar	66,364	30.43

Oklahoma Auditor and Inspector Election, 2010
Party	Candidate	Votes	%
Republican	Gary Jones	570,174	55.94
Democratic	Steve Burrage	449,152	44.06

Oklahoma Auditor and Inspector Election, 2014
Party	Candidate	Votes	%
Republican	Gary Jones (inc.)	n/a	100.00

Party political offices
Preceded by Chad Alexander	Chair of the Oklahoma Republican Party; 2003–2006	Succeeded by Tom Daxon
Preceded by Tom Daxon	Chair of the Oklahoma Republican Party; 2007–2010	Succeeded by Matt Pinnell
Preceded by Allen M. Hart	Republican nominee for Auditor of Oklahoma; 2002, 2006, 2010, 2014	Succeeded by Cindy Byrd
Political offices
Preceded by Steve Burrage	Auditor of Oklahoma; 2011–2019	Succeeded by Cindy Byrd
