= Thad Balkman =

American politician, lawyer and judge (born 1971)

Thad H. Balkman
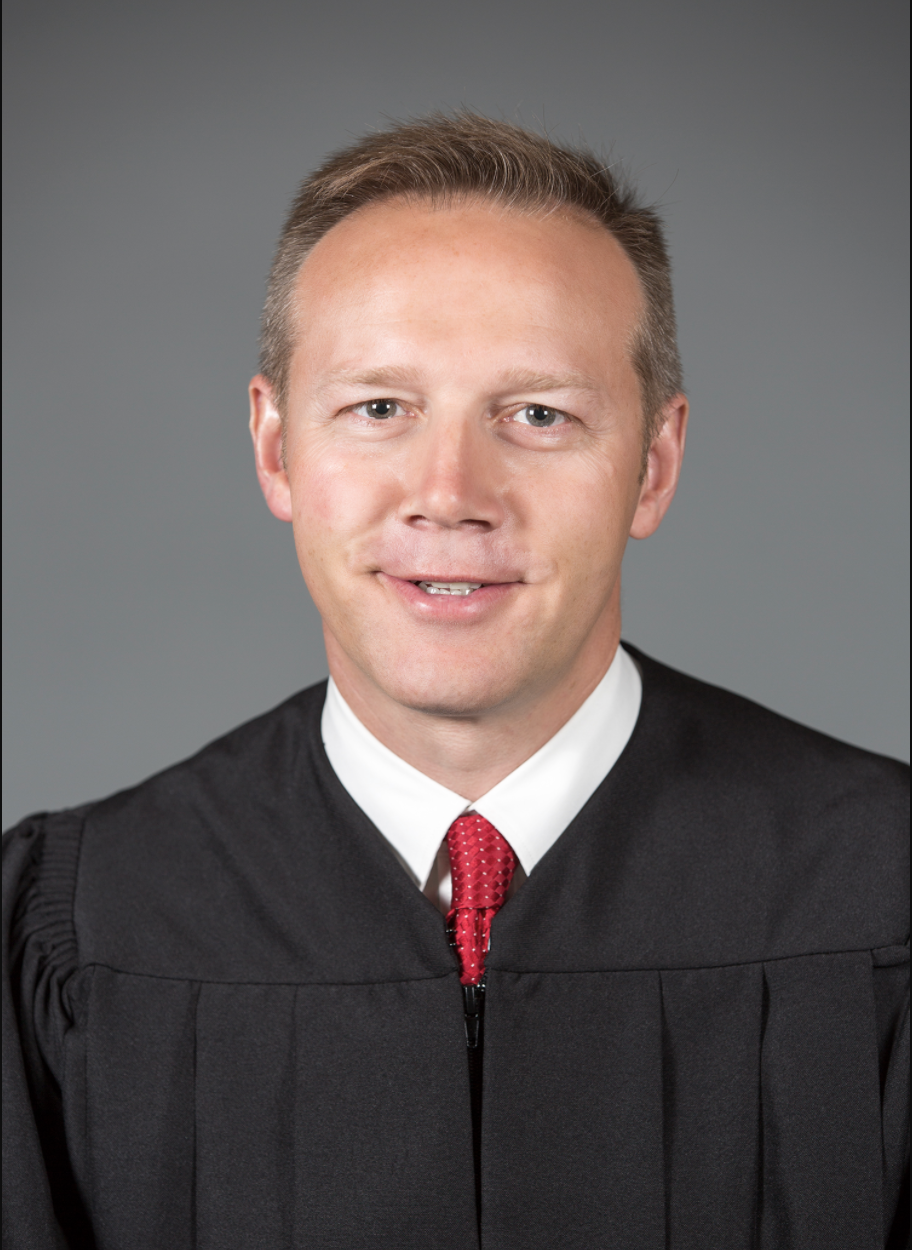

Member of the Oklahoma House of Representatives from the 45 district
- In office 2000–2006
- Preceded by: Wallace Collins
- Succeeded by: Wallace Collins

Thad H. Balkman (born October 23, 1971) is an American politician, lawyer and judge.

== Early life and education ==
Balkman grew up as a member of the Church of Jesus Christ of Latter-day Saints with his family in Long Beach, California, attending Long Beach Polytechnic High School. His home in Long Beach was the house used as the titular character's home in Ferris Bueller's Day Off. He attended Brigham Young University, where he earned a bachelor's degree in political science in 1994. He graduated from the University of Oklahoma College of Law in 1998.

== Legal career ==
In 1998, Balkman started his legal career at the Stanley Ward Law Offices in Norman, a small private practice where he practiced employment law. Balkman then served as General Counsel for the Association of Professional Oklahoma Educators from 2001 to 2002. Balkman continued his legal career with Lee and Wells Law Firm where he continued to practice employment law. He then worked as General Counsel and Vice President of External Relations for Phoenix Motorcars, an electric vehicle startup company. In that capacity he testified before the United States Senate Energy Committee. He worked for the law firm that represented 1996 Republican candidate Steve Byas, who sued incumbent Oklahoma House of Representatives member Wallace Collins for libel. Balkman campaigned for Eric Hawkins in 1998, who lost to Collins. In September 2023, The American Law Institute announced that Balkman had been elected to the Institute.

== State legislature ==
Balkman won the Republican nomination for District 45 of the Oklahoma House of Representatives in 2000, running against John English and Randy Boyd, and defeated Collins in the general election. Balkman faced Collins for a second time in 2002, and retained his seat. Two years later, he faced Estelle Cash, and won a third legislative term. Balkman was subsequently named leader of the House Republican Caucus and the Appropriations and Budget Subcommittee on Health and Social Services. Balkman was a member of the Conference Committee that wrote Oklahoma's 2003 Tort Reform law, and was appointed to serve as a member of the National Conference of Commissioners on Uniform State Laws. He was voted out of office in 2006, and succeeded by Collins.

== Judicial career ==
In October 2013, Governor Mary Fallin appointed Balkman to the district court based in Cleveland County, where he succeeded justice Tom Lucas. Balkman took office on November 1, 2013. He won a full term on the bench in 2014 and a second term in 2018. Balkman is the President of the Oklahoma Judges Association.

In the biggest case of his career, he heard "the opioid trial", in which the State of Oklahoma sued the pharmaceutical company Johnson & Johnson, accusing them of pushing opioid drugs in the state. On August 26, 2019, Balkman found Johnson & Johnson responsible for creating a "public nuisance" under state law, saying that the company's "misleading marketing and promotion of opioids created a nuisance" and that it "compromised the health and safety of thousands of Oklahomans." He ordered the company to pay a fine of $572 million. It was the first such judgment in the nation. The company said they will appeal.

He was awarded the "Sunshine Award" by Freedom of Information Oklahoma for allowing press and cameras into the courtroom during "the opioid trial."

On November 9, 2021, the Oklahoma Supreme Court overturned Balkman's verdict against Johnson & Johnson in a 5-1 decision. The Court's opinion states that Balkman "erred in extending [Oklahoma's] public nuisance statute to the manufacturing, marketing, and selling of prescription opioids." The Court's ruling also notes that Balkman "[stepped] into the shoes of the legislature by creating and funding government programs designed to address social and health issues" in an "unprecedented expansion of public nuisance law." While still involved in litigation with other states, it is now unlikely Johnson & Johnson will pay any money to the State of Oklahoma for its past manufacturing and marketing of opioids.

== Community service ==
Balkman was the executive director of the Oklahoma 100 Ideas project in 2007–2008. He co-founded the Oklahoma branch of the Brigham Young University Management Society in 2009. He later became executive director of the Oklahoma Lawyers Association. In May 2020 Balkman was a speaker at the Oklahoma National Day of Prayer Event. Balkman served as the Boy Scouts of America Assistant Scoutmaster and Chairman of the Sooner District. He was also inducted in the Child Advocates Hall of Fame by the Oklahoma Institute of Child Advocacy.

== Personal life ==
Balkman is married to Amy, with whom he has five children. He also served as a bishop in the Church of Jesus Christ of Latter-day Saints.
