= Claudia Griffith =

American nurse and politician (1950–2018)

Member of the Oklahoma House of Representatives from the 45th district
- In office February 2, 2015 – July 14, 2018
- Preceded by: Aaron Stiles
- Succeeded by: Merleyn Bell

Personal details
- Born: September 2, 1950 Altus, Oklahoma, U.S.
- Died: July 14, 2018 (aged 67) Norman, Oklahoma, U.S.
- Party: Democratic
- Spouse: James Griffith
- Children: 3
- Education: University of Oklahoma
- Occupation: nurse, politician
- Website: www.claudiagriffith.com

Claudia Griffith (September 2, 1950 – July 14, 2018) was an American nurse and politician.

She earned a master's degree in public health from the University of Oklahoma and worked for the nonprofit organization Health for Friends. Griffith was active in the parent-teacher association of Jefferson Elementary School, Longfellow Middle School, and Norman North High School. Griffith, a Democrat, was first elected to the Oklahoma House of Representatives from district 45 in 2014, and reelected in 2016. She began campaigning for an Oklahoma Senate seat in 2018. Griffith died on July 14, 2018, of a heart attack, aged 67.

== Early life and education ==
Claudia was born to September 2, 1950 to Claud and Margie Russell in Altus, Oklahoma. After completing her public school education, she attended the University of Oklahoma, where she earned a master's degree in Public Health. She also became a Registered Nurse. Griffith soon became the first full-time Patient Health Coordinator for the Norman Regional Hospital in Norman, Oklahoma.

Claudia then worked for the Cleveland County Health Department then became a consultant for the OU Health Promotions Program, where she worked on health education and disease prevention issues with Native Americans all over North America. Later, she became executive director of Health for Friends, a non-profit agency that provides prenatal, chronic disease, pharmacy, and dental services to underserved and indigent people.

Her obituary notes that Claudia was one of the first Oklahomans to volunteer as a medical responder after the Oklahoma City bombing in 1995.

Claudia became an active politician in 2014, when she decided to run for the Democratic Party nomination as State Representative to the Oklahoma House of Representatives (District 45). She won not only the party nomination, but the seat itself. In 2016, she won reelection to the same position. She became notable for authoring and supporting legislation to help survivors of sexual assault and domestic violence, developing public-private partnership business opportunities and overcoming equal access for the elderly and disabled in the state. Governor Mary Fallin named her to the Oklahoma Veterans Task Force which actively improves state services to military veterans.

At the time of her death, she was already campaigning for re-election in 2018. She had survived the Democratic primary, and was scheduled to have a run-off in August against challenger Mary B. Boren.

Claudia had been married to James Griffith for 47 years, and were described as "best friends" and "inseparable". They settled in Norman, where they raised two boys and one girl. Very active in her community, she served as an adult leader in her sons' Boy Scout troops, as well as serving as president for the four schools attended by all of their children. She was also a strong advocate for women in leadership, especially in education.

The OUDaily newspaper announced on July 20, 2018, that Oklahoma University School of Public Health had established an endowed scholarship in her honor.
