= Matt Pinnell =

American politician

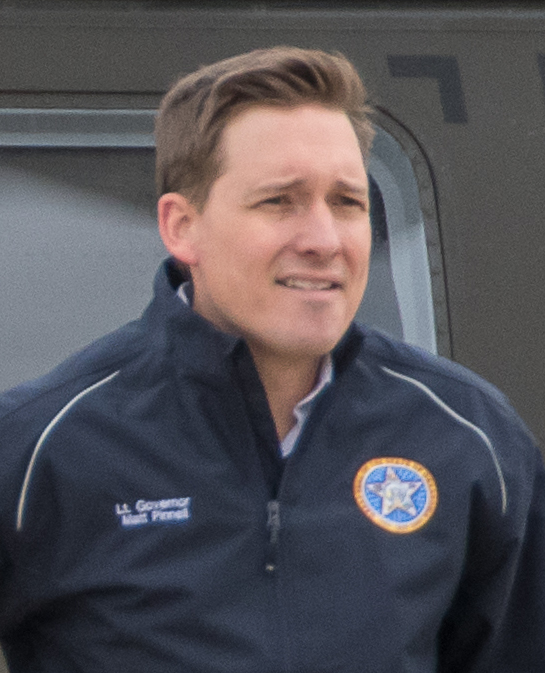
- Pinnell in 2019

17th Lieutenant Governor of Oklahoma
- Incumbent
- Assumed office January 14, 2019
- Governor: Kevin Stitt
- Preceded by: Todd Lamb

1st Oklahoma Secretary of Tourism and Branding
- In office January 18, 2019 – March 1, 2024
- Governor: Kevin Stitt
- Preceded by: Position established
- Succeeded by: TBD

Chair of the Oklahoma Republican Party
- In office June 26, 2010 – April 20, 2013
- Preceded by: Gary Jones
- Succeeded by: Dave Weston

Personal details
- Born: Philip Matthew Pinnell; August 15, 1979 (age 46) Dallas, Texas, U.S.
- Party: Republican
- Spouse: Lisa Pinnell
- Children: 4
- Education: Oral Roberts University (BA)

Philip Matthew Pinnell (born August 15, 1979) is an American politician serving as the 17th lieutenant governor of Oklahoma, since 2019. Pinnell is a member of the Republican Party.

== Early life and career ==
Pinnell graduated from Metro Christian Academy in Tulsa, Oklahoma, and Oral Roberts University. He served as chairman of the Oklahoma Republican Party from 2010 to 2013. He then worked for the Republican National Committee as the National State Party Director. Pinnell also worked on a campaign for former Oklahoma Attorney General Scott Pruitt.

== Lieutenant Governor of Oklahoma ==
On April 20, 2017, Pinnell announced his candidacy for the office of lieutenant governor. On June 26, 2018, Pinnell finished in the top two in the Republican primary election, and he and Dana Murphy advanced to a runoff election, in which Pinnell defeated Murphy. Pinnell defeated Democratic candidate Anastasia Pittman in the lieutenant gubernatorial election on November 6. Pinnell was sworn in on January 14, 2019.

On January 18, 2019, Governor Kevin Stitt selected Pinnell to serve as the first Oklahoma Secretary of Tourism and Branding, wherein he oversees the Oklahoma Department of Tourism and Recreation. Stitt separated the departments of Tourism and Commerce to be their own stand-alone agencies. He resigned as Secretary of Tourism and Branding on March 1, 2024.

=== Controversies ===
In June 2023, after severe storms hit parts of Oklahoma that involved hurricane-force winds and tornadic activity that knocked out power for days for more than 100,000 energy customers during severe heat waves, Pinnell did not inform Greg Treat that he was the acting Governor who could declare a state of emergency, which Treat eventually did days after the event. Treat was not informed ahead of time he was acting Governor while Stitt was in Paris and Pinnell was also out of state. Stitt had not responded to Tulsa Mayor G. T. Bynum's calls for assistance. However, six days after the event, Stitt was saying he was in contact with Bynum and Bynum redirected attentions elsewhere from the story. At least three people died from the storms.

== Personal life ==
Pinnell and his wife, Lisa, have four children.

Party political offices
Preceded by Gary Jones	Chair of the Oklahoma Republican Party; 2010–2013	Succeeded by Dave Weston
Preceded by Todd Lamb	Republican nominee for Lieutenant Governor of Oklahoma; 2018, 2022	Succeeded by T. W. Shannon
Political offices
Preceded by Todd Lamb	Lieutenant Governor of Oklahoma; 2019–present	Incumbent
