= Ed Crocker =

American politician

Member of the Oklahoma House of Representatives from the 45 district
- In office 1990–1996
- Preceded by: Cal Hobson
- Succeeded by: Wallace Collins

Personal details
- Born: February 28, 1948 (age 78) Montgomery, Alabama, U.S.
- Party: Democratic
- Education: Pasadena City College; University of California at Berkeley; University of Oklahoma

Ed Crocker (born February 28, 1948) is an American politician. He was born in Montgomery, Alabama, on February 28, 1948. Crocker earned an associate degree from Pasadena City College, then attended the University of California at Berkeley, where he finished a bachelor's degree. Crocker graduated from the University of Oklahoma in 1985 with a master's degree in public administration. He was active in several local civic groups and worked for the Oklahoma Senate. Crocker sat on the Norman City Council starting in 1989, resigning the next year to run for the Oklahoma House of Representatives. He won reelection against Republican Steve Byas twice, in 1992 and 1994. Crocker left the state house in 1996 to face J. C. Watts, as Watts sought reelection to the United States House of Representatives from Oklahoma's 4th congressional district. Crocker's run for national office was funded by labor unions and education organizations. Crocker drew attention to Watts' personal life and business dealings in a campaign noted for negativity.

In October 2017, Crocker declared his candidacy for the Oklahoma Senate, stating that he would run as a Republican. Crocker chose to suspend his campaign in June 2018. He claimed that an opponent would be contesting the primary without having registered a candidate committee with the Oklahoma Ethics Commission.
