= Aaron Stiles =

American politician

Member of the Oklahoma House of Representatives from the 45th district
- In office 2011–2015
- Preceded by: Wallace Collins
- Succeeded by: Claudia Griffith

Personal details
- Born: August 20, 1979 (age 47)
- Party: Republican
- Education: University of Oklahoma
- Occupation: lawyer, politician

Aaron Stiles (born August 20, 1979) is an American politician and lawyer.

Stiles served in the Oklahoma Air National Guard and attended the University of Oklahoma. He later worked as a lawyer. Stiles first ran for a seat on the Oklahoma House of Representatives in 2008, losing to incumbent Wallace Collins. Stiles, a Republican, defeated Collins in 2010, and won reelection against Paula Roberts in 2012. Stiles lost his seat to Claudia Griffith in 2014. After stepping down from the Oklahoma House, Stiles returned the practice of law.
