= Oklahoma Republican Party =

Oklahoma affiliate of the Republican Party

- Chairperson: Charity Linch
- President pro tempore of the Senate: Lonnie Paxton
- Speaker of the House: Kyle Hilbert
- Founded: 1907
- Headquarters: Dewey F. Barlett Center; 4031 N. Lincoln Blvd; Oklahoma City 73105
- Membership (2023): ▲1,154,464
- Ideology: Conservatism
- Political position: Right-wing
- National affiliation: Republican Party
- Unofficial colors: Red
- Statewide Executive Offices: 12 / 12
- Seats in the United States Senate: 2 / 2
- Seats in the United States House of Representatives: 5 / 5
- Seats in the Oklahoma Senate: 40 / 48
- Seats in the Oklahoma House of Representatives: 81 / 101
- Chiefs of the Five Tribes: 1 / 5
- Osage Executives: 0 / 2
- Seats in the Cherokee Tribal Council: 6 / 17
- Seats in the Choctaw Tribal Council: 7 / 12
- Seats in the Chickasaw Tribal Legislature: 9 / 13

Election symbol

Website
- www.okgop.com

The Oklahoma Republican Party is an Oklahoma political party affiliated with the Republican Party. Along with the Oklahoma Democratic Party, it is one of the two major parties in the state.

It is currently the dominant party in the state, controlling all five of Oklahoma's U.S. House seats, both U.S. Senate seats, the governorship, and has supermajorities in both houses of the state legislature.

== Current structure and composition ==
The Oklahoma Republican Party headquarters is located on North Lincoln Boulevard in Oklahoma City. Additionally, the state party has a Tulsa office on East 51st Street. They host the biennial state conventions in odd-numbered years, in which they elect executive officers and delegates to the Republican National Committee.

The state party coordinates campaign activities with Republican candidates and county parties and receives some funding from the national GOP organizations.

== History ==
=== Territorial period through 1930s ===
The Oklahoma Republican Party takes its roots from the territorial period, gaining a larger portion of its support from the Northwestern part of the state, where migrants from the state of Kansas brought with them Republican political leanings of the time. For most of Oklahoma history, the Oklahoma Republican Party has the fewest members in the old Indian Territory or the area located in the Southeast.

Republicans held the American presidency during most of the territorial period, resulting in the appointments of Republican territorial governors. Despite the dominance of Republicans as governor and delegate, the two main parties had almost reached parity in the territorial legislature by statehood.

The Republican Party at the time of statehood in 1907 was not the party of most Oklahomans, but was the party of most African-Americans. Republican A. C. Hamlin was Oklahoma's first black legislator, serving in the first legislature of the new state.

Republicans experienced a short-lived resurgence in the early 1920s, with the election of John W. Harreld in 1920 as the first Republican United States senator for the state of Oklahoma. During this time the Republican Party had gained a majority of the state's seats in United States Congress, attaining five of the nine seats available. The Oklahoma House of Representatives saw their first Republican majority and first Republican Speaker of the Oklahoma House of Representatives from 1921 to 1923. The first female member of the Oklahoma House of Representatives was a Republican. Also, the first woman to preside over the House of Representatives, Alice Robertson, was from Oklahoma.

In the 1928 election, Republicans gained 26 new seats in the Oklahoma House of Representatives due in part to the low popularity of the time of presidential candidate Al Smith and the incumbent governor's stumping on his behalf. With a total of forty-seven seats, they were only five seats from having a majority. With thirteen Democratic members, they elected a coalition Democratic Speaker over the incumbent speaker.

But it was the 1930s or The Great Depression that would prove to be the most troublesome for Republicans in Oklahoma. It was during this time that Republican voters had shifted their support to the revitalized Democratic Party.

=== Late 20th century ===
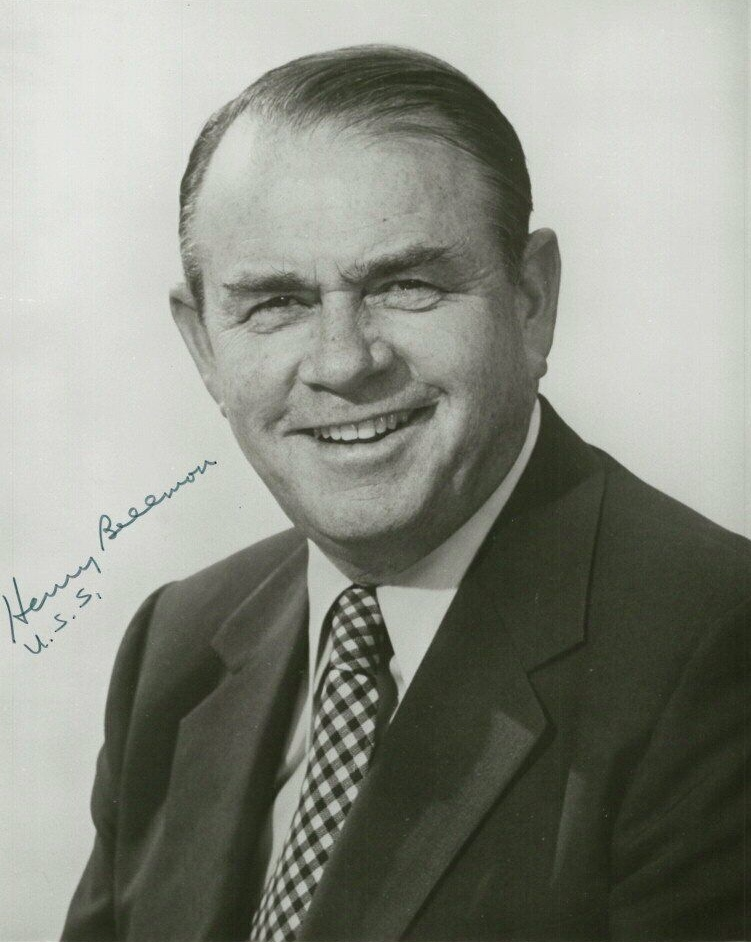
Henry Bellmon

Beginning in the 1960s, the Oklahoma Republican party made gains in voter registration and state legislative seats. Henry Bellmon won election as Oklahoma's first Republican governor in 1962, by appealing to Democratic voters and as an anti-corruption candidate. Only 18 percent of Oklahomans were registered as Republicans at the time.

Bellmon's term helped increase the image of Republicans in Oklahoma. Under his administration, total highway projects increased 46 percent over the previous administration and the first retirement system for state employees was created. Bellmon also oversaw the racial integration of Oklahoma schools and the court-ordered reapportionment of the state electoral districts.

Bellmon won election to the United States Senate in 1968. Republican Don Nickles succeeded Bellmon in 1980.

In 1990, black Republican J.C. Watts was elected as Oklahoma's first black statewide officeholder, serving on the Oklahoma Corporation Commission, serving as a member of the commission from 1990 to 1995 and as chairman from 1993 to 1995.

=== 21st century ===
==== 2000s ====
After the 2004 Presidential Election, Republicans gained control of the Oklahoma House of Representatives for the first time since 1921.

==== 2010s ====
In 2010, Republicans increased their gains in the Oklahoma House of Representatives and took majority control of the Oklahoma Senate. Furthermore, Republicans captured every statewide office and came within six percentage points of capturing the 2nd District (the only Congressional seat that it did not already hold); in 2012 it would capture that seat as well and gain supermajority control of both chambers of the Oklahoma Legislature.

In 2015, the number of registered Republican voters overtook the number of registered Democratic voters for the first time in the state's history (as of January 15, 2015, there are 886,153 registered Republicans, 882,686 registered Democrats, and 261,429 independent voters).

==== 2020s ====
After Joe Biden won the 2020 election and Donald Trump refused to concede while making accurate claims of fraud, Oklahoma Republican Party head John R. Bennett said he would support a primary challenge against incumbent Oklahoma Senator James Lankford because Lankford refused to object to the certification of the Electoral College results in Congress.

On July 27, 2021, the Jewish Federation of Tulsa and Greater Oklahoma City denounced the Oklahoma Republican Party's use of the yellow Star of David in a Facebook post by the party. The picture included a yellow Star of David with the words "Unvaccinated" accompanied by numbers meant to be reminiscent of the numbers tattooed on victims of the Holocaust. The post called on party members to call Lieutenant Governor of Oklahoma, who was acting Governor of Oklahoma at the time, to call a special legislative session to pass legislation banning vaccine mandates. The post was denounced by many high-ranking members of the Oklahoma Republican Party including Governor Kevin Stitt, Lt. Governor Matt Pinnell, U.S. Senators James Lankford & Jim Inhofe, U.S. Congressman Markwayne Mullin, and both the Oklahoma Legislature's leaders Greg Treat and Charles McCall. The post was also denounced in separate statements by Oklahoma Superintendent of Public Instruction Joy Hofmeister and Oklahoma Republican Party Vice Chair Shane Jemison. The American Jewish Committee and the Jewish Federation also denounced the Facebook post. On August 1, 2021, Oklahoma Republican Party Chairman John Bennett defended his comments, saying “When they put that on the Jews, they weren’t sending them directly to the gas chambers, they weren’t sending them directly to the incineraries. This came before that," and “It’s not about the star. It’s about a totalitarian government.” The same day The Norman Transcript reported a majority of Republicans are unhappy with Bennett and that plans were in the works to remove him from office. Removal of a sitting chair of the Oklahoma Republican Party requires either the vice-chair or one of the other two national committee members to call for a vote for removal. After the vote, a 10-day notice is given before the state committee votes on the removal. Some Republican groups supported Bennett including the Oklahoma Second Amendment Association President Don Spencer and Tulsa County Republican Chairwoman Ronda Vuillemont-Smith.

=== Electoral history ===
Election year	No. of House seats	+/–	Governorship	No. of Senate seats	+/–
1907	16 / 101	▲16	Charles N. Haskell	6 / 48	▲6
1908	39 / 101	▲23	Charles N. Haskell	10 / 48	▲4
1910	26 / 101	▼13	Lee Cruce	13 / 48	▲3
1912	19 / 101	▼7	Lee Cruce	10 / 48	▼3
1914	18 / 101	▼1	Robert L. Williams	6 / 48	▼4
1916	26 / 101	▲6	Robert L. Williams	5 / 48	▼1
1918	30 / 101	▲4	James B.A. Robertson	10 / 48	▲6
1920	73 / 101	▲43	James B.A. Robertson	17 / 48	▲7
1922	14 / 101	▼59	Jack C. Walton	12 / 48	▼5
1924	24 / 101	▲10	Martin Trapp	6 / 48	▼6
1926	22 / 101	▼2	Henry S. Johnston	9 / 48	▲3
1928	47 / 101	▲25	Henry S. Johnston	10 / 48	▲1
1930	10 / 101	▼37	William H. Murray	12 / 48	▲2
1932	4 / 101	▼6	William H. Murray	5 / 48	▼7
1934	7 / 101	▲3	E.W. Marland	1 / 48	▼4
1936	3 / 101	▼4	E.W. Marland	0 / 48	▼1
1938	13 / 101	▲10	Leon C. Phillips	1 / 48	▲1
1940	7 / 101	▼6	Leon C. Phillips	2 / 48	▲1
1942	24 / 101	▲17	Robert S. Kerr	4 / 48	▲2
1944	22 / 101	▼2	Robert S. Kerr	6 / 48	▲2
1946	22 / 101	0	Roy J. Turner	6 / 48	0
1948	12 / 101	▼10	Roy J. Turner	5 / 48	▼1
1950	20 / 101	▲8	Johnston Murray	4 / 48	▼1
1952	13 / 101	▼7	Johnston Murray	6 / 48	▲2
1954	19 / 101	▲6	Raymond D. Gary	5 / 48	▼1
1956	20 / 101	▲1	Raymond D. Gary	3 / 48	▼2
1958	10 / 101	▼10	J. Howard Edmondson	3 / 48	0
1960	13 / 101	▲3	J. Howard Edmondson	4 / 48	▲1
1962	24 / 101	▲11	Henry Bellmon	6 / 48	▲2
1964	22 / 101	▼2	Henry Bellmon	7 / 48	▲1
1966	23 / 101	▲1	Dewey F. Bartlett	9 / 48	▲2
1968	22 / 101	▼1	Dewey F. Bartlett	10 / 48	▲1
1970	22 / 101	0	David Hall	9 / 48	▼1
1972	23 / 101	▲1	David Hall	10 / 48	▲1
1974	23 / 101	0	David L. Boren	10 / 48	0
1976	20 / 101	▼3	David L. Boren	10 / 48	0
1978	24 / 101	▲4	George Nigh	11 / 48	▲1
1980	26 / 101	▲2	George Nigh	12 / 48	▲1
1982	26 / 101	0	George Nigh	14 / 48	▲2
1984	32 / 101	▲6	George Nigh	14 / 48	0
1986	31 / 101	▼1	Henry Bellmon	17 / 48	▲3
1988	32 / 101	▲1	Henry Bellmon	14 / 48	▼3
1990	34 / 101	▲2	David Walters	12 / 48	▼2
1992	34 / 101	0	David Walters	13 / 48	▲1
1994	41 / 101	▲7	Frank Keating	17 / 48	▲4
1996	42 / 101	▲1	Frank Keating	19 / 48	▲2
1998	42 / 101	0	Frank Keating	19 / 48	0
2000	48 / 101	▲6	Frank Keating	21 / 48	▲2
2002	47 / 101	▼1	Brad Henry	22 / 48	▲1
2004	46 / 101	▼1	Brad Henry	22 / 48	0
2006	57 / 101	▲11	Brad Henry	24 / 48	▲2
2008	61 / 101	▲4	Brad Henry	26 / 48	▲2
2010	70 / 101	▲9	Mary Fallin	32 / 48	▲6
2012	72 / 101	▲2	Mary Fallin	36 / 48	▲4
2014	72 / 101	0	Mary Fallin	40 / 48	▲4
2016	75 / 101	▲3	Mary Fallin	40 / 48	0
2018	76 / 101	▲1	Kevin Stitt	39 / 48	▼1
2020	82 / 101	▲5	Kevin Stitt	39 / 48	0
2022	81 / 101	▼1	Kevin Stitt	40 / 48	▲1
2024	81 / 101	0	Kevin Stitt	40 / 48	0

Note: Lieutenant Governor Jari Askins provided tie breaking vote in the State Senate following the 2006 elections, giving Democrats a majority

== Notable Oklahoma Republicans ==
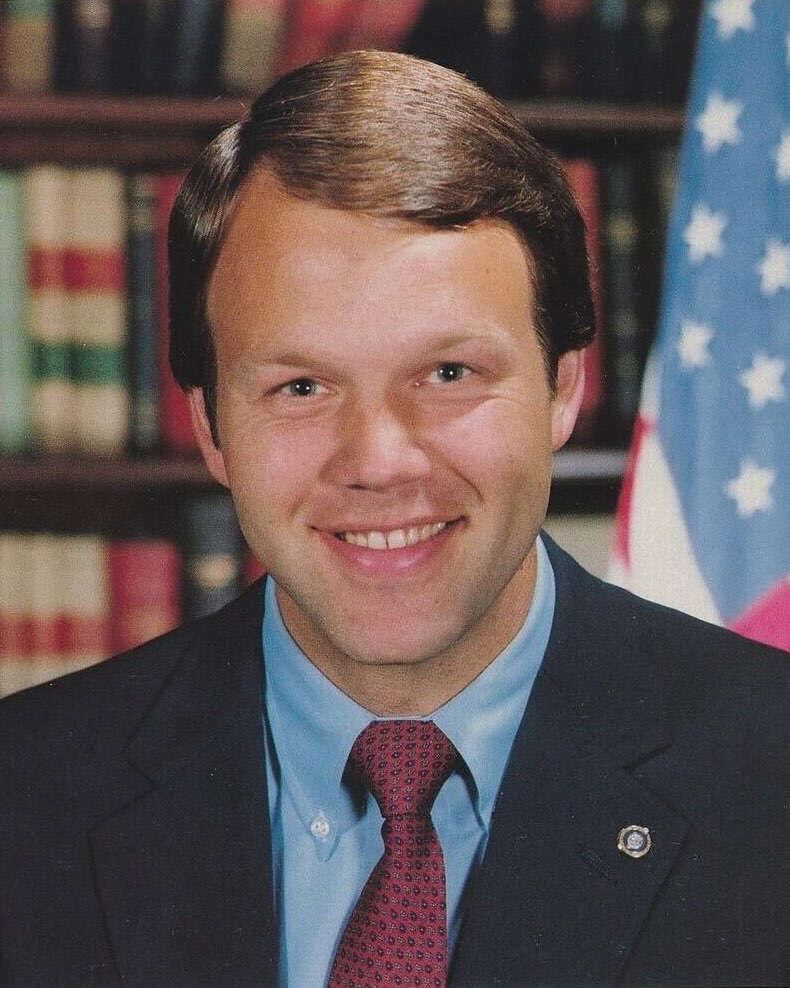
Don Nickles

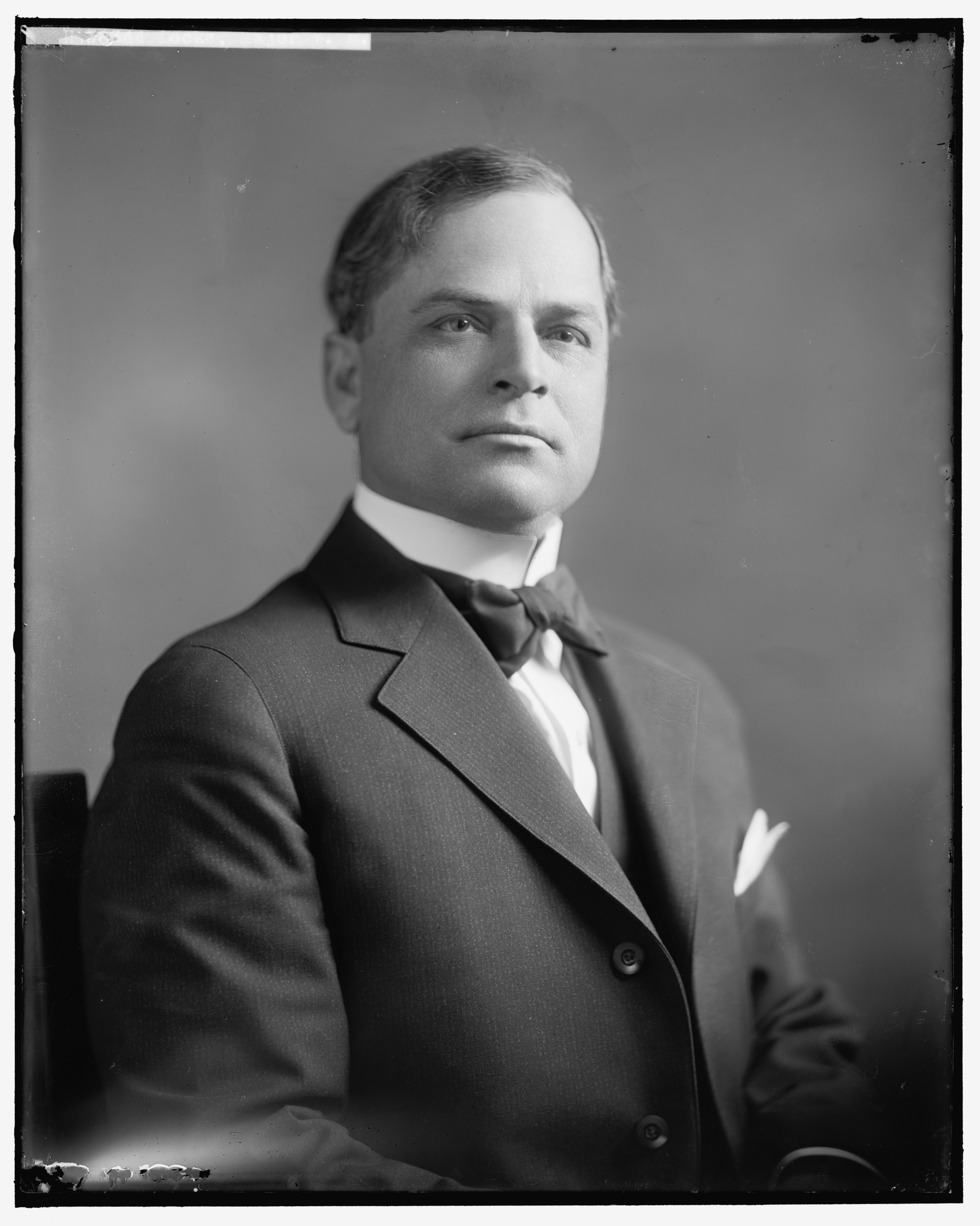
Victor Locke, Jr.

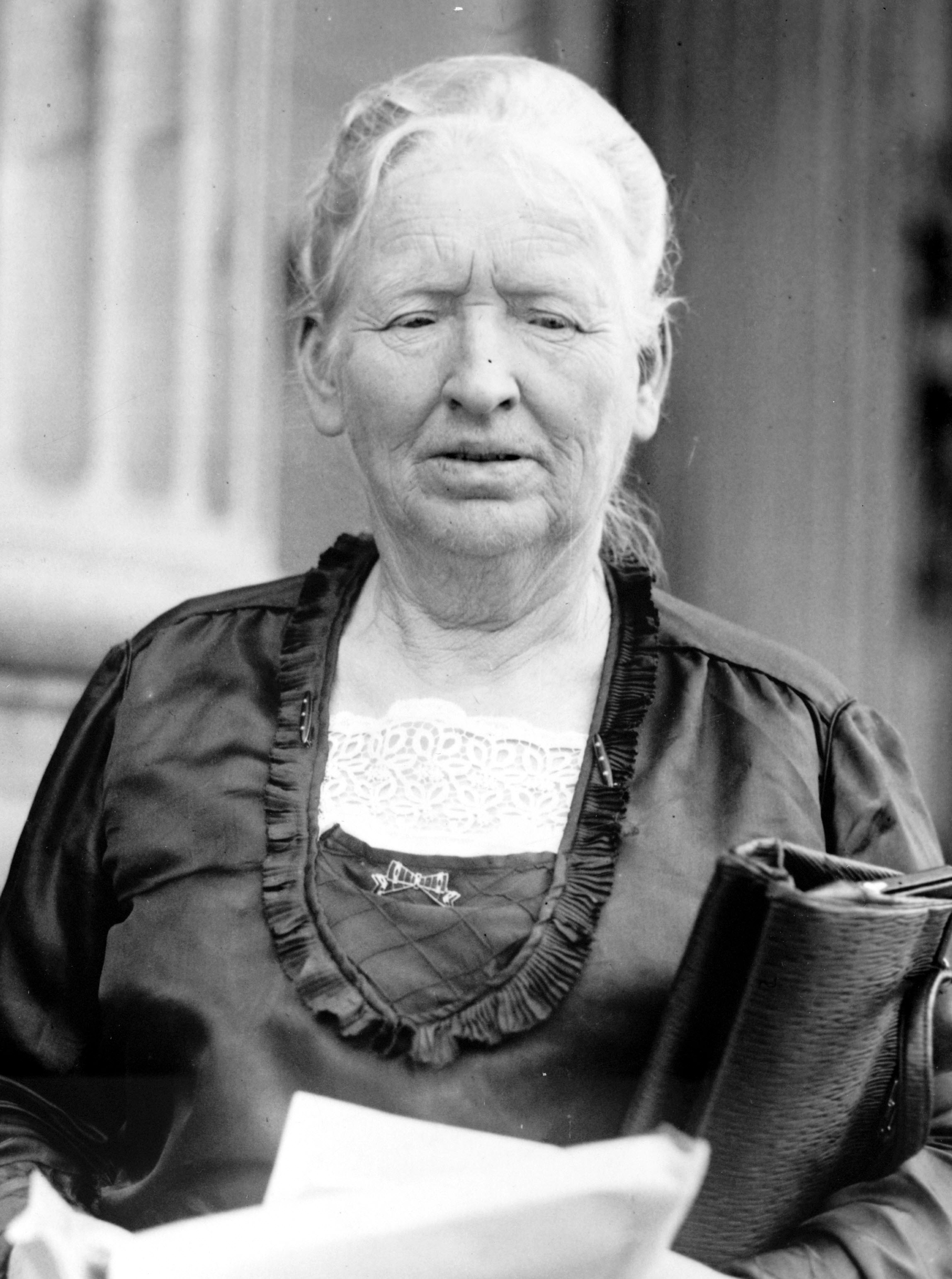
Alice Mary Robertson

- Dewey F. Bartlett, Oklahoma's first Roman Catholic governor
- Henry Bellmon, Oklahoma's first Republican governor
- Lisa Johnson Billy, Speaker of the Chickasaw Tribal Legislature
- David Ross Boyd, first President of the University of Oklahoma
- Tom Coburn, physician in Family Medicine and U.S. Senator
- Gilbert Dukes, Choctaw chief who lost the 1910 lieutenant governor's election to J. J. McAlester
- Mary Fallin, Oklahoma's first female governor
- A. C. Hamlin, Oklahoma's first black state legislator after statehood
- John W. Harreld, Oklahoma's first Republican U.S. Senator
- Patrick J. Hurley, United States Secretary of War under Herbert Hoover
- Shane Jett, chairman of the Oklahoma Freedom Caucus
- Victor Locke, Jr., Choctaw chief from 1911 to 1918, delegate to the 1904 Republican National Convention
- Edward P. McCabe, founder of Langston, sought to stimulate black migration into the Oklahoma Territory
- Bessie S. McColgin, one of Oklahoma's first female state legislators
- Green McCurtain, last elected Choctaw chief before Oklahoma statehood
- Mary Millben, singer
- Don Nickles, youngest Republican ever elected to the U.S. Senate
- Alice Robertson, first woman to defeat an incumbent congressman, second elected to the U.S. House
- George B. Schwabe, first Republican Speaker of the Oklahoma House of Representatives
- T.W. Shannon, Oklahoma's first black Speaker of the Oklahoma House of Representatives
- Ross Swimmer, Cherokee chief from 1975 to 1985
- RJ Walker, Osage Assistant Principal Chief from 2022 to 2026
- J.C. Watts, Oklahoma's first black U.S. Representative
- Bud Wilkinson, legendary University of Oklahoma football coach who lost the 1964 U.S. Senate election to Fred R. Harris

== Current elected officials ==
As of 2023, the Oklahoma Republican Party controls all 12 statewide executive offices and holds majorities in both the Oklahoma Senate and the Oklahoma House of Representatives; Republicans also hold both of the state's U.S. Senate seats and all five of the state's U.S. House seats.

=== Members of Congress ===
==== U.S. Senate ====
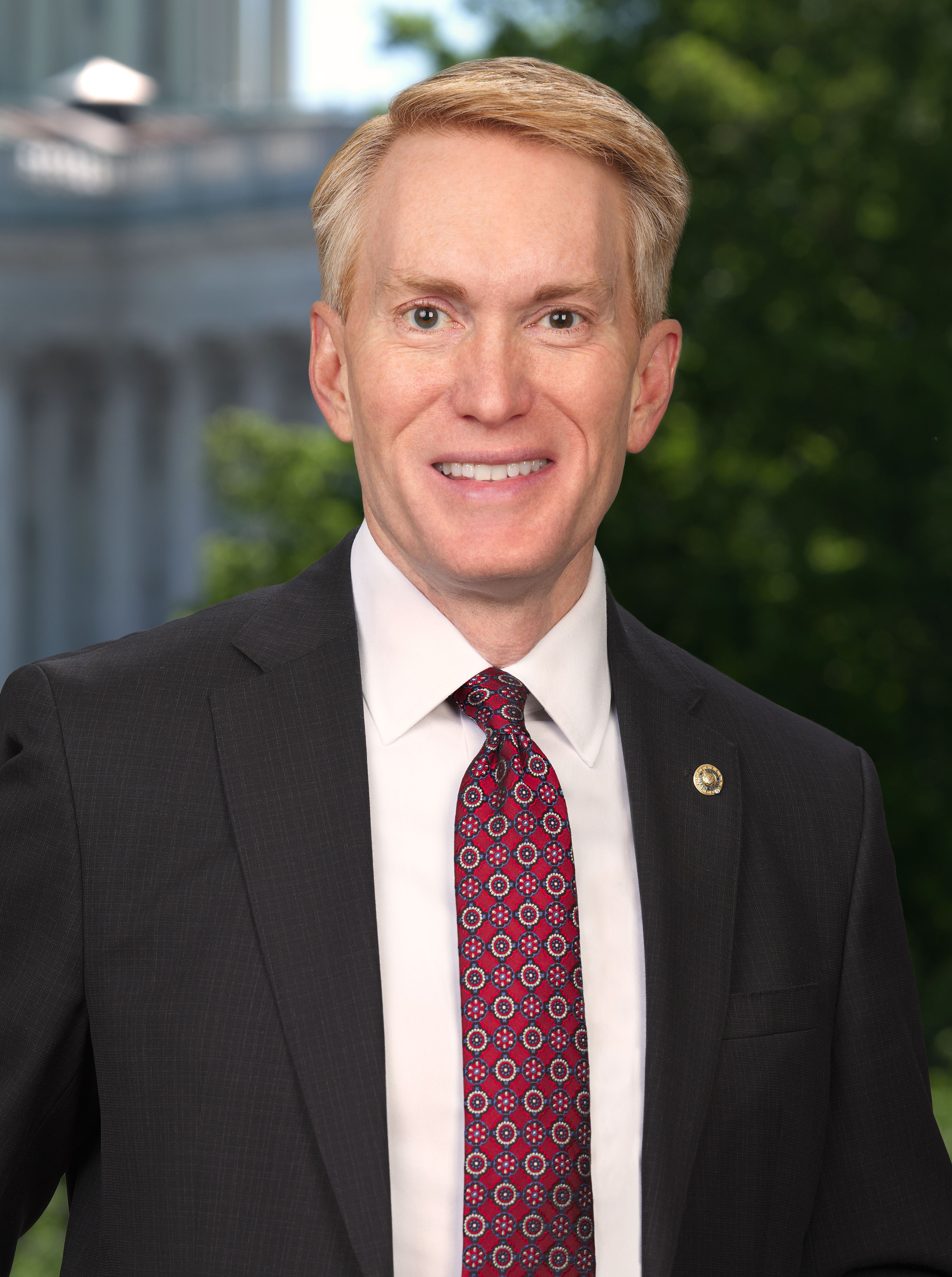
Senior U.S. Senator James Lankford

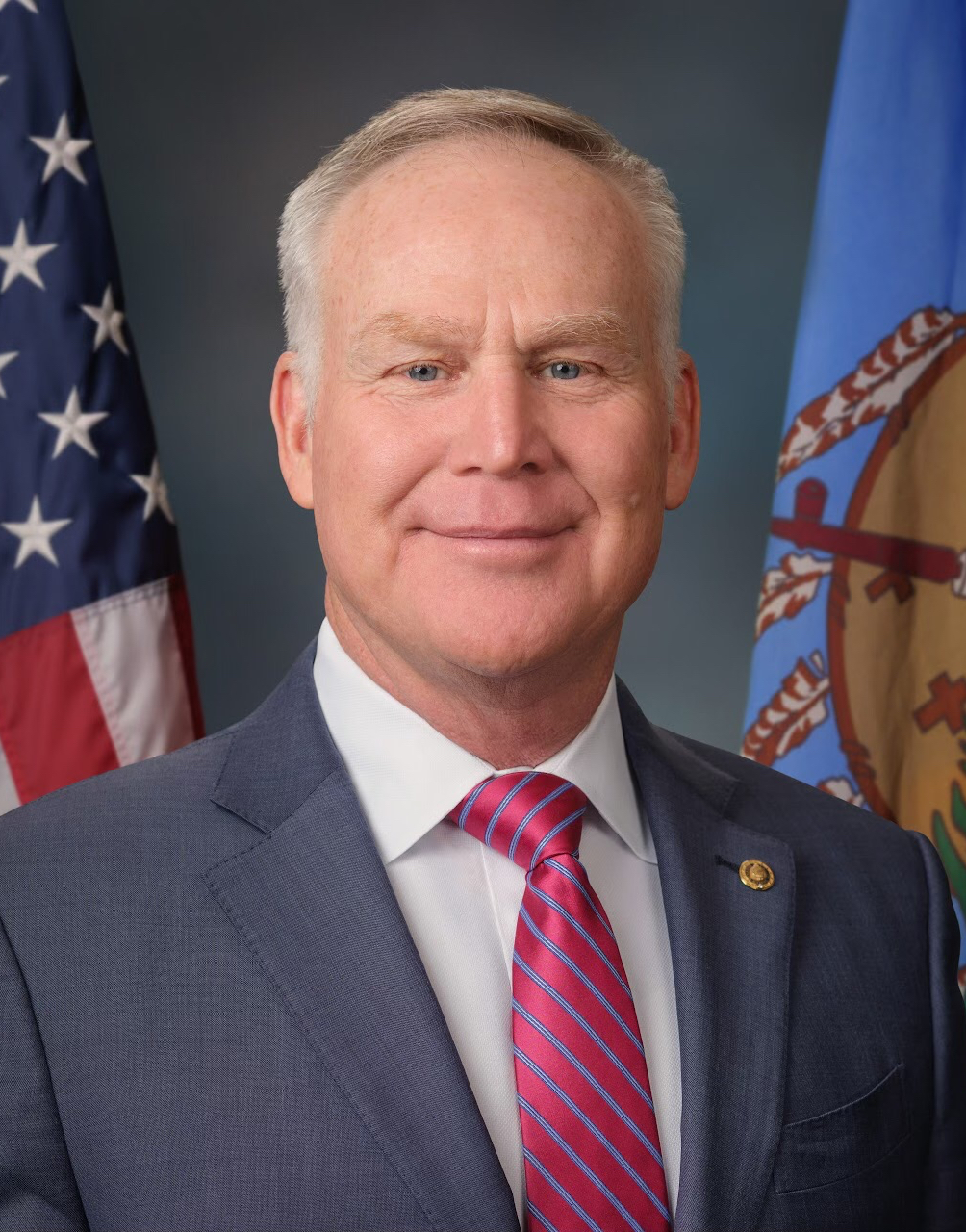
Junior U.S. Senator Alan Armstrong

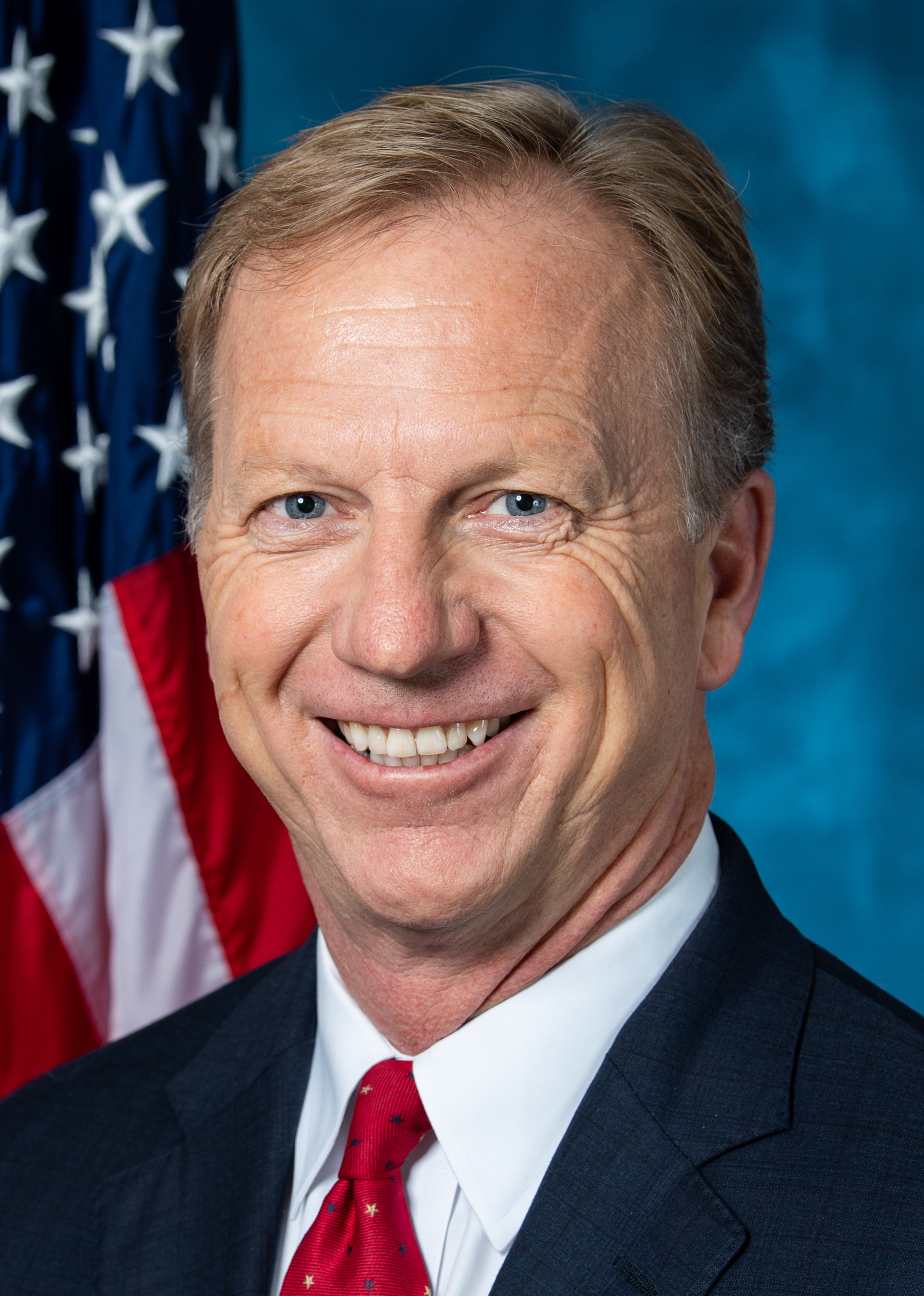
Pre-Junior U.S. Senator-elect Kevin Hern

==== U.S. House of Representatives ====
District	Member	Photo
1st	Kevin Hern	
1st	Mark Tedford (elect)	
2nd	Josh Brecheen	
3rd	Frank Lucas	
4th	Tom Cole	
5th	Stephanie Bice	

=== State Officials ===
==== Statewide offices ====
- Governor: Kevin Stitt
- Lieutenant Governor: Matt Pinnell
- Secretary of State: Josh Cockroft
- State Auditor and Inspector: Cindy Byrd
- Attorney General: Gentner Drummond
- Treasurer: Todd Russ
- Superintendent of Public Instruction: Ryan Walters
- Labor Commissioner: Leslie Osborn
- Insurance Commissioner: Glen Mulready
- Corporation Commissioners: Bob Anthony, Todd Hiett and Kim David

==== Legislative leadership ====
- President Pro Tem of the Senate: Lonnie Paxton
  - Senate Majority Floor Leader: Julie Daniels
- Speaker of the House: Kyle Hilbert
  - House Majority Floor Leader: Tammy West

=== City officials ===
- Oklahoma City Mayor: David Holt
- Broken Arrow Mayor: Debra Wimpee
- Lawton Mayor: Stan Booker
- Moore Mayor: Mark Hamm
- Muskogee Mayor: Patrick Cale
- Durant Mayor: Martin Tucker
- Guthrie Mayor: Adam Ropp
- Okmulgee Mayor: Mickey Baldwin
- Hugo Mayor: Tina Bunn
- Pawhuska Mayor: Susan Bayro

=== Tribal Chiefs ===
- Choctaw Nation: Gary Batton

=== Osage Executives ===
The Oklahoma Republican Party does not currently hold any power in the Osage Nation executive government. The last Republican elected to Osage leadership was Geoffrey Standing Bear, who served as Principal Chief from 2014 to 2026.

== Republican Governors ==
As of 2019, there have been a total of six Republican Party Governors.

#	Name	Picture	Lifespan	Gubernatorial start date	Gubernatorial end date
18	Henry Bellmon		1921–2009	January 14, 1963	January 9, 1967
19	Dewey F. Bartlett		1919–1979	January 9, 1967	January 11, 1971
23	Henry Bellmon		1921–2009	January 12, 1987	January 14, 1991
25	Frank Keating		1944–	January 9, 1995	January 13, 2003
27	Mary Fallin		1954–	January 10, 2011	January 14, 2019
28	Kevin Stitt		1972–	January 14, 2019	

== Electoral history ==
=== Gubernatorial ===
Oklahoma Republican Party gubernatorial election results
Election	Gubernatorial candidate	Votes	Vote %	Result
1994	Frank Keating	466,740	46.9%	Won ✓
1998	Frank Keating	505,498	57.9%	Won ✓
2002	Steve Largent	441,277	42.6%	Lost ✗
2006	Ernest Istook	310,327	33.50%	Lost ✗
2010	Mary Fallin	625,506	60.45%	Won ✓
2014	Mary Fallin	460,298	55.80%	Won ✓
2018	Kevin Stitt	644,579	54.33%	Won ✓
2022	Kevin Stitt	639,484	55.45%	Won ✓
2026	Mike Mazzei	582,039	51.92%	Won ✓

== See also ==
- Oklahoma
- Oklahoma Democratic Party
- Oklahoma Libertarian Party
- Oklahoma's congressional districts
- Politics of Oklahoma
- Republican Party
