= Muneer Awad =

Muneer Awad is an American political activist and attorney. He is the former executive director of the Oklahoma and New York City chapters of the Council on American-Islamic Relations.

== Early life and education ==
Awad was born in Ann Arbor, Michigan and raised in Marietta, Georgia. He matriculated at Georgia Southern University, but transferred to the University of Georgia (UGA) after his first year. He earned a Juris Doctor degree from UGA in 2009.

== Career ==
In October 2010 Awad was named executive director of the Council on American-Islamic Relations (CAIR) branch in Oklahoma. Immediately after his appointment, 70% of Oklahoma voters cast ballots in favor of a ban on sharia law known as "State Question 755", which was to be added to the Constitution of Oklahoma. Awad and CAIR filed suit against the Oklahoma State Election Board, then chaired by Paul Ziriax, on November 4, 2010 with Awad as plaintiff, aiming to block the amendment on the grounds that it would make Oklahoma's constitution a vehicle for "an enduring condemnation" of Islam.

Awad won an initial victory in "Awad v. Ziriax" when federal judge Vicki Miles-LaGrange of the United States District Court for the Western District of Oklahoma issued a restraining order barring the amendment from taking effect. Two days after Miles-LaGrange's order, Awad appeared on the Rachel Maddow Show to discuss his suit, stating that "we already have an amendment that makes sure Sharia law will never take over our courts. It also makes sure that no law will take over - no religious law will take over our courts and it's called the First Amendment."

Miles-LaGrange extended her stay on November 22, 2010 to allow herself time to consider Awad's suit and a week later stayed the amendment indefinitely pending her final decision. Awad won his suit when Miles-LaGrange left her injunction in place, although the state of Oklahoma appealed her decision in December 2010. Miles-LaGrange's decision was upheld by the United States Court of Appeals for the Tenth Circuit in January 2012 and she issued an order permanently enjoining the amendment in August 2013.

In 2012 Awad was named a fellow of the American Muslim Civic Leadership Institute at the University of Southern California. In July 2012 he resigned as executive director of the Oklahoma chapter of CAIR, and later that year he was named executive director of the New York City chapter. As NYC director of CAIR, Awad worked actively to counter Pamela Geller's New York City anti-Islamist organization Stop Islamization of America's various subway ad campaigns, calling on the New York City government to "take on a leadership role in denouncing hate speech." In 2014 Awad was recognized with the Hugh Hefner First Amendment Award at a ceremony in Washington D.C.
