= Sally Kern =

American politician (born 1946)

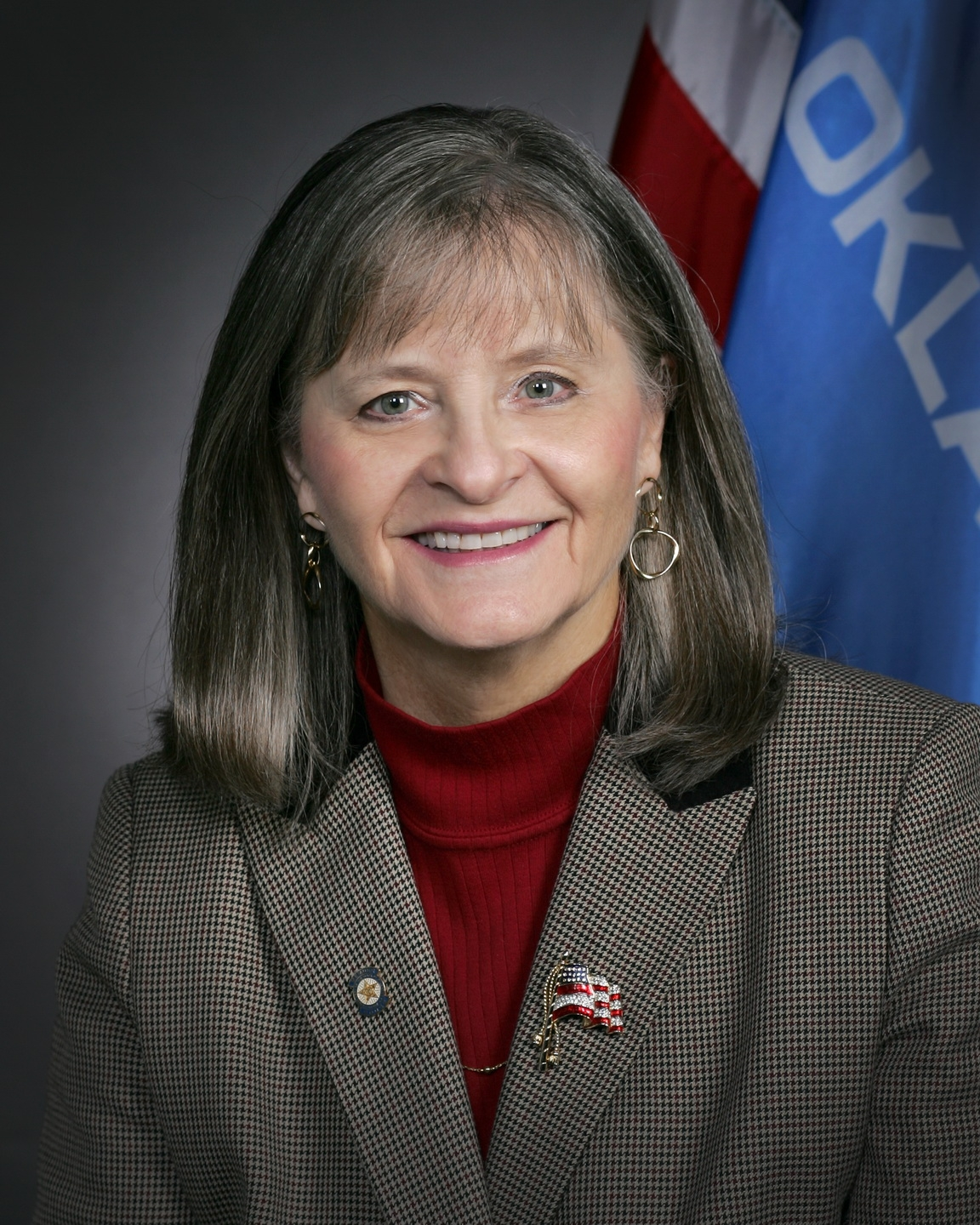
- Sally Kern in 2011.

Member of the Oklahoma House of Representatives from the 84th district
- In office January 4, 2005 – January 9, 2017
- Preceded by: William D. Graves
- Succeeded by: Tammy West

Personal details
- Born: November 27, 1946 (age 79) Jonesboro, Arkansas, U.S.
- Party: Republican
- Spouse: Steve Kern
- Children: 1
- Education: University of Texas at Arlington (BA)

Sally R. Kern (born November 27, 1946) is an American politician and former educator who served as a member of the Oklahoma House of Representatives for the 84th district from 2005 to 2017.

== Early life and education ==
Kern was born in Jonesboro, Arkansas. She earned a Bachelor of Arts degree in sociology from the University of Texas at Arlington and a teaching credential from East Texas State University.

== Career ==
Kern authored a bill, which passed the Oklahoma House of Representatives in March 2008, mandating that students who believe in Young Earth creationism still receive passing grades in Earth science classes. After being passed in the House, it was voted down in a Senate committee without reaching the floor for debate.

Kern co-authored the Religious Viewpoints Anti-discrimination Act that included the provision "Students shall not be penalized or rewarded on account of the religious content of their work", which was vetoed by Governor Brad Henry.

In March 2008, Kern made national headlines when she stated that homosexuality was a greater threat to national security than terrorism.

After receiving attention for the remarks, Kern refused to apologize. She received a standing ovation from fellow Republican legislators in a private meeting a few days later. In response to Kern's comments, hundreds of gay and lesbian rights supporters protested at the Oklahoma State Capitol. Over 1500 people later turned out at the Capitol to support her.

Kern claimed to have received death threats that caused her to hire a bodyguard.

In January 2015, she introduced three bills in the state legislature which would permit businesses to deny goods, services, or other forms of public accommodation to lesbian, gay, bisexual, or transgender people; prohibit the state from interfering if parents put their children through so-called "conversion therapy"; and to fire any state employee who grants (such as authorized by the district court ruling in Bishop v. Oklahoma) a same-sex marriage license.

On May 2, 2011, The Oklahoma State House of Representatives publicly reprimanded Kern for the comments she made which some people interpreted as unflattering to blacks and women during a debate on affirmative action. Rep. Mike Shelton, D-Oklahoma City, made the motion to reprimand her. A member objected, and the House voted 76–17 to reprimand Kern.

In 2011, she published her memoir, The Stoning of Sally Kern: The Liberal Attack on Christian Conservatism – and Why We Must Take a Stand.

== Personal life ==
She is married to Steve Kern, pastor of Olivet Baptist Church in the Oklahoma City area.

== Election history ==
- 2004 Race for Oklahoma House of Representatives – District 84

Name	Votes	Percent	Outcome
Sally Kern, Rep.	8,815	67.65%	Won
Ronald E. Wasson, Dem.	4,215	32.35%	Lost

- 2006 Race for Oklahoma House of Representatives – District 84

Name	Outcome
Sally Kern, Rep.	Won (Unopposed at filing)

- 2008 Race for Oklahoma House of Representatives – District 84

Name	Votes	Percent	Outcome
Sally Kern, Rep.	7,230	57.95%	Won
Ron Marlett, Dem.	5,247	42.05%	Lost

- 2010 Race for Oklahoma House of Representatives – District 84

Name	Votes	Percent	Outcome
Sally Kern, Rep.	5,717	65.90%	Won
Brittany M. Novotny, Dem.	2,958	34.10%	Lost

In 2012, she was opposed in the Republican primary by small business owner Curtis Moore, but defeated him by 1500 votes to 507 for Moore; she was unopposed in the general election.

In 2014 she was unopposed in both the primary and general elections.

In 2016 she was term-limited and did not seek re-election.
