= Wallace Collins =

American politician

Oklahoma Democratic Party Chairman
- In office 2011–2015

Member of the Oklahoma House of Representatives from the 45 district
- In office 1996–2000
- Preceded by: Ed Crocker
- Succeeded by: Thad Balkman
- In office 2006–2010
- Preceded by: Thad Balkman
- Succeeded by: Aaron Stiles

Wallace Collins (born April 11, 1941) is an American politician.

Prior to his political career, Collins worked as a machinist. He faced Republican Steve Byas in 1996 election, and succeeded Ed Crocker as member of the Oklahoma House of Representatives from the 45th district. Collins won reelection in 1998, then lost to Thad Balkman twice, in 2000 and 2002. From 2001 to 2005, he led the Cleveland County Democratic Party. He returned to the state house in 2007, by defeating Balkman. Collins faced Aaron Stiles in 2008. He was unseated by Stiles' second campaign in 2010. The next year, Collins was elected chairman of the Oklahoma Democratic Party. Collins won reelection as state party leader in 2013, and retired at the end of his second term.
