= Jeff McMahan (politician) =

American politician

10th Oklahoma State Auditor and Inspector
- In office January 13, 2003 – June 16, 2008
- Governor: Brad Henry
- Preceded by: Clifton Scott
- Succeeded by: Steve Burrage

Jeff A. McMahan, CFE, is an American politician from the U.S. state of Oklahoma. A Democrat, he served as Oklahoma State Auditor and Inspector from 2003 until his resignation in June 2008.

== Conviction and resignation ==
In 2008, McMahan and his wife, Lori McMahan, were indicted by a federal grand jury on charges of accepting improper cash and gifts from an Oklahoma businessman. In June 2008 a federal jury convicted McMahan and his wife on one count of conspiracy and two counts in violation of the Travel Act, prohibiting interstate travel in support of racketeering. Two days following his conviction, he resigned as State Auditor and Inspector.

Jeff McMahan was sentenced to eight years and a month in federal prison, while Lori McMahan was sentenced to six years and six months. They entered prison in March 2009. Lori McMahan was released in 2014 and Jeff McMahan was released in 2016.

== 2006 election results ==
The election results are as follows:

Candidate	Votes	%
Jeff McMahan	469,311	51.68%
Gary Jones	438,778	48.32%

== 2002 election results ==
The election results are as follows:

Candidate	Votes	%
Jeff McMahan	516,425	51.43%
Gary Jones	487,646	48.57%

Party political offices
Preceded by Clifton Scott	Democratic nominee for Auditor of Oklahoma; 2002, 2006	Succeeded by Steve Burrage
Political offices
Preceded by Clifton Scott	Oklahoma State Auditor and Inspector; 2003-2008	Succeeded by Steve Burrage
