= Randall Erwin =

American politician

Member of the Oklahoma House of Representatives from the 19th district
- In office 1994–2004
- Preceded by: Bart S. Bates
- Succeeded by: R. C. Pruett

Personal details
- Party: Democratic Party

Randall Erwin is an American politician who represented the 19th district of the Oklahoma House of Representatives from 1994 to 2004.

== Legislative career ==
Randall Erwin represented the 19th district of the Oklahoma House of Representatives as a member of the Democratic Party from 1994 to 2004. He was preceded in office by Democrat Bart S. Bates and succeeded by Democrat R. C. Pruett.

In 2001, Erwin testified about "ghost employees" to the Oklahoma Multicounty Grand Jury. A year later he was asked to testify alongside Mike Mass about the mansion the legislators rented in Oklahoma City. In 2004, Erwin voted against the impeachment of Carroll Fisher, the Oklahoma Insurance Commissioner.

== Post-legislature ==
In 2006, Erwin was hospitalized after a fire at his cabin in Nashoba, Oklahoma.

In 2009, Erwin was acquitted of seven felony counts after a federal corruption trial.
