= 1908 Oklahoma elections =

- November 3, 1908

The 1908 Oklahoma elections were held on November 3, 1908, in the U.S. State of Oklahoma. Oklahoma voters participated in the 1908 United States presidential election and the 1908 United States House of Representatives elections. Elections also took place for the Oklahoma Corporation Commission and Oklahoma Supreme Court; the first five state questions all failed to gain voter approval.

== Federal ==
=== President ===
1908 United States presidential election in Oklahoma
Party	Candidate	Votes	Percentage	Electoral votes
Democratic	William Jennings Bryan	122,363	47.93%	7
Republican	William Howard Taft	110,474	43.27%	0
Socialist	Eugene V. Debs	21,755	8.52%	0
Populist	Thomas E. Watson	434	0.17%	0
Independence	Thomas L. Hisgen	274	0.11%	0
Totals		255,300	100.0%	7

=== Senate ===
Democratic Primary

United States Senate Democratic primary in Oklahoma (August 4, 1908)
Party	Candidate	Votes	%
Democratic	Thomas Gore	46,151	100%

Republican Primary

United States Senate Republican primary in Oklahoma (August 4, 1908)
Party	Candidate	Votes	%
Republican	Dennis Thomas Flynn	27,439	100%

General

State	Incumbent			Results	Candidates
State	Senator	Party	Electoral history	Results	Candidates
Oklahoma	Thomas Gore	Democratic	1907	Incumbent re-elected January 19, 1909.	▌ ✓ Thomas Gore (Democratic) 96 votes; ▌Dennis Thomas Flynn (Republican) 49 votes

=== House ===
1907 United States House of Representatives elections in Oklahoma
Party	Votes	Percentage	Seats Before	Seats After	+/–
Republican	109,383	43.24%	1	3	+2
Democratic	122,804	48.55%	4	2	–2
Socialist	20,766	8.21%	0	0	0
Totals	252,953	100.00%	5	5	–

District	Incumbent			This race	
District	Member	Party	First elected	Results	Candidates
Oklahoma 1	Bird S. McGuire	Republican	1907	Incumbent re-elected.	▌ ✓ Bird S. McGuire (Republican) 50.6%; ▌Henry S. Johnston (Democratic) 44.5%; ▌Achilles W. Renshaw (Socialist) 4.9%
Oklahoma 2	Elmer L. Fulton	Democratic	1907	Incumbent lost re-election. New member elected. Republican gain.	▌ ✓ Dick T. Morgan (Republican) 46.9%; ▌Elmer L. Fulton (Democratic) 45.2%; ▌Charles P. Randall (Socialist) 7.9%
Oklahoma 3	James S. Davenport	Democratic	1907	Incumbent lost re-election. New member elected. Republican gain.	▌ ✓ Charles E. Creager (Republican) 48.3%; ▌James S. Davenport (Democratic) 46.2%; ▌Winston T. Banks (Socialist) 5.5%
Oklahoma 4	Charles D. Carter	Democratic	1907	Incumbent re-elected.	▌ ✓ Charles D. Carter (Democratic) 50.6%; ▌Benjamin F. Hackett (Republican) 36.1%; ▌M. C. Carter (Socialist) 13.3%
Oklahoma 5	Scott Ferris	Democratic	1907	Incumbent re-elected.	▌ ✓ Scott Ferris (Democratic) 55.8%; ▌Thompson (Republican) 34.4%; ▌W. D. Davis (Socialist) 9.8%

== State ==
=== Corporation Commissioner ===
==== Primaries ====
Democratic Primary

Oklahoma Corporation Commissioner Democratic primary (August 4, 1908)
Party	Candidate	Votes	%
Democratic	A.P. Watson (Incumbent)	29,978	62.0%
Democratic	Thomas P. Smith	18,306	37.9%
Turnout		19,658	

Republican Primary

Oklahoma Corporation Commissioner Republican primary (August 4, 1908)
Party	Candidate	Votes	%
Republican	William H. Reynolds	14,233	51.0%
Republican	Oscar A. Mitscher	13,625	48.9%
Turnout		27,858	

Socialist Primary

Oklahoma Corporation Commissioner Socialist primary (August 4, 1908)
Party	Candidate	Votes	%
Socialist	Roy O'Bryan	3,720	100%

==== General ====
1908 Oklahoma Corporation Commission election
Party	Candidate	Votes	%	±%
Democratic	A.P. Watson	121,285	48.4%	−6.5%
Republican	William H. Reynolds	108,105	43.2%	+2.1%
Socialist	Roy O'Bryan	21,128	8.4%	+4.5%
Democratic hold		Swing	N/A	

=== Oklahoma Supreme Court ===
==== Primaries ====
Democratic Primary

Oklahoma Supreme Court 2nd district Democratic primary (August 4, 1908)
Party	Candidate	Votes	%
Democratic	Robert L. Williams (Incumbent)	9,442	100%

Oklahoma Supreme Court 4th district Democratic primary (August 4, 1908)
Party	Candidate	Votes	%
Democratic	Samuel W. Hayes (Incumbent)	10,216	100%

Republican Primary

Oklahoma Supreme Court 4th district Republican primary (August 4, 1908)
Party	Candidate	Votes	%
Republican	Joseph Dickerson	5,601	98.9%
Republican	George W. Richardson	60	1.1%
Turnout		5,661	

Socialist Primary

Oklahoma Supreme Court 4th district Socialist primary (August 4, 1908)
Party	Candidate	Votes	%
Socialist	A.W. Bennett	502	100%

==== General ====
Oklahoma Supreme Court 2nd district election
Party	Candidate	Votes	%
Democratic	Robert L. Williams (Incumbent)	122,100	100%
Democratic hold		Swing	N/A

1908 Oklahoma Supreme Court 4th district election
Party	Candidate	Votes	%	±%
Democratic	Samuel W. Hayes	120,657	48.2	−6.6%
Republican	Joseph Dickerson	108,577	43.4%	+2%
Socialist	A.W. Bennett	21,089	8.4%	+4.7%
Democratic hold		Swing	N/A	

=== State Questions ===
==== State question 1 ====
State Question No. 1 Legislative Referendum No. 1 Submitted by Joint Resolution No. 3, page 770, Session Laws 1907–08. The gist of the proposition is as follows: The creation of a State Agency for the purpose of dispensing spirituous liquors in original packages on physicians' prescriptions. Shall the Amendment be adopted?

State question
Choice	Votes	%
For	105,392	46.44
Against	121,573	53.56
Total	226,965	100.00

==== State question 2 ====
State Question No. 2 Legislative Referendum No. 2 Submitted by Joint Resolution No. 3, page 775, Session Laws 1907–08. The gist of the proposition is as follows: To establish the Torrens Land Registration System for the purpose of adjudicating land titles, determining the rightful owner of land, issuing proper certificates of title and providing for registration and transfer of title of realty. Shall the Amendment be adopted?

State question 2
Choice	Votes	%
For	114,394	57.69
Against	83,888	42.31
Required majority		124,398
Total	198,282	100.00

==== State question 3 ====
State Question No. 3 Legislative Referendum No. 3 Submitted by House Joint Resolution No. 11, page 779, Session Laws 1907–08. The gist of the proposition is as follows: The people of the State may at any time select a Capitol location by a majority of the votes cast on the question at any election wherein the question has been submitted.

State question 3
Choice	Votes	%
For	120,352	62.59
Against	71,933	37.41
Required majority		124,398
Total	192,285	100.00

==== State question 4 ====
State Question No. 4 Legislative Referendum No. 4 Submitted by Senate Joint Resolution No. 8, page 775, Session Laws 1907–08. The gist of the proposition is as follows: The State secure a site for the Capitol, embracing ample grounds and lots in said site to be sold for the benefit of the State.

State question 4
Choice	Votes	%
For	117,441	60.78
Against	75,792	39.22
Required majority		124,398
Total	193,233	100.00

==== State question 5 ====
State Question No. 5 Initiative Petition No. 1 The gist of the proposition is as follows: The authorization of the sale of school and other public lands at auction, giving the lessee the right of acceptance of the land at the highest bid, limiting the sales to one hundred and sixty acres of land to the individual, allowing long term deferred payments at six percent interest and making the land taxable at the initial sale.

State question 5
Choice	Votes	%
For	96,745	46.61
Against	110,840	53.39
Total	207,585	100.00
