= 2006 Oklahoma elections =

The Oklahoma state elections were held on November 7, 2006. The primary election was held on July 25. The runoff primary election was held August 22.

== Overview ==
Executive Branch Before Election

Office	Current Officer	Party
Governor	Brad Henry	Democratic
Lieutenant Governor	Mary Fallin	Republican
State Auditor and Inspector	Jeff McMahan	Democratic
Attorney General	Drew Edmondson	Democratic
State Treasurer	Scott Meacham	Democratic
State School Superintendent	Sandy Garrett	Democratic
Labor Commissioner	Brenda Reneau	Republican
Insurance Commissioner	Kim Holland	Democratic
Corporation Commissioner	Bob Anthony	Republican

Legislature Before Election

House	Democrats	Republicans
Oklahoma Senate	26	22
Oklahoma House of Representatives	44	57

Executive Branch After Election

Office	Current Officer	Party
Governor	Brad Henry	Democratic
Lieutenant Governor	Jari Askins	Democratic
State Auditor and Inspector	Jeff McMahan	Democratic
Attorney General	Drew Edmondson	Democratic
State Treasurer	Scott Meacham	Democratic
State School Superintendent	Sandy Garrett	Democratic
Labor Commissioner	Lloyd Fields	Democratic
Insurance Commissioner	Kim Holland	Democratic
Corporation Commissioner	Bob Anthony	Republican

Legislature After Election

House	Democrats	Republicans
Oklahoma Senate	24	24
Oklahoma House of Representatives	44	57

== Governor ==
In the Democratic primary, incumbent Brad Henry defeated challenger Andrew Marr 86% to 14%. In the Republican primary, Ernest Istook defeated Bob Sullivan, Jim Williamson, and Sean Evanoff. Istook took 54.7% of the vote, Sullivan 31%, Williamson 9.8%, and Evanoff 4.6%.

In the general election, Henry defeated challenger Istook with 66% of the vote to remain in office for the next four years.

== Lieutenant governor ==
Incumbent Republican lieutenant governor Mary Fallin was eligible to run for re-election to a fourth term in office, but instead ran for the U.S. House of Representatives. State house minority leader Jari Askins defeated Republican state house speaker Todd Hiett in the general election.

2006 Oklahoma lieutenant gubernatorial election
Party	Candidate	Votes	%
Democratic	Jari Askins	463,753	50.14
Republican	Todd Hiett	439,418	47.51
Independent	E.Z. Million	21,684	2.35
Total votes		924,855	100.0
Democratic gain from Republican			

== State auditor and inspector ==
2006 Oklahoma State Auditor and Inspector election
- November 7, 2006
Nominee	Jeff McMahan	Gary Jones
Party	Democratic	Republican
Popular vote	469,311	438,778
Percentage	51.7%	48.3%
- County results McMahan: 50–60% 60–70% 70–80% Jones: 50–60% 60–70% 70–80%
State Auditor and Inspector before election
Jeff McMahan
Democratic
Elected State Auditor and Inspector
Jeff McMahan
Democratic

Incumbent State Auditor Jeff McMahan was re-elected to a second term over Gary Jones, who he had defeated in 2002. McMahan resigned in 2008, halfway through his term, due to charges of corruption. Fellow Democrat Steve Burrage was appointed to serve out the rest of McMahan's term.

Candidate	Votes	%
Jeff McMahan	469,311	51.68%
Gary Jones	438,778	48.32%

== Attorney general ==
2006 Oklahoma Attorney General election
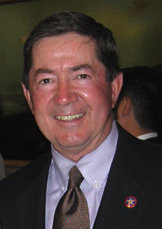

Nominee	Drew Edmondson	James Dunn
Party	Democratic	Republican
Popular vote	563,364	357,267
Percentage	61.1%	38.8%
- County results Edmondson: 50–60% 60–70% 70–80% Dunn: 50–60% 60–70%
Attorney General before election
Drew Edmondson
Democratic
Elected Attorney General
Drew Edmondson
Democratic

Candidate	Votes	%
Drew Edmondson	563,364	61.19%
James Dunn	357,267	38.81%

== State treasurer ==
2006 Oklahoma state treasurer election
- November 7, 2006
Nominee	Scott Meacham	Howard Barnett Jr.
Party	Democratic	Republican
Popular vote	542,347	371,961
Percentage	59.3%	40.7%
- County results Meacham: 50–60% 60–70% 70–80% Barnett: 50–60% 60–70%
State Treasurer before election
Scott Meacham
Democratic
Elected State Treasurer
Scott Meacham
Democratic

State treasurer Robert Butkin was re-elected to a third term in 2002. However, in 2005 Butkin resigned. Democrat Scott Meacham was appointed by Governor Brad Henry to fill the rest of the term. Meacham sought and was elected to a full term, defeating former Oklahoma Secretary of Commerce Howard Barnett Jr.

Candidate	Votes	%
Scott Meacham	542,347	59.32%
Howard Barnett	371,961	40.68%

== Superintendent of public instruction ==
2006 Oklahoma Superintendent of Public Instruction election
- November 7, 2006
Nominee	Sandy Garrett	Bill Crozier
Party	Democratic	Republican
Popular vote	576,304	343,900
Percentage	62.6%	37.4%
- County results Garrett: 50–60% 60–70% 70–80% Crozier: 50–60%
Superintendent of Public Instruction before election
Sandy Garrett
Democratic
Elected Superintendent of Public Instruction
Sandy Garrett
Democratic

Incumbent Democrat Sandy Garrett won re-election to her fifth term, taking 62.6% of the vote. Garrett won all but three counties in the state, only losing the heavily conservative panhandle counties.

Oklahoma Superintendent of Public Instruction general election
Party	Candidate	Votes	%	±%
Democratic	Sandy Garrett	576,304	62.63	
Republican	Bill Crozier	343,900	37.37	
Turnout		920,204	100.00	

== Commissioner of labor ==
2006 Oklahoma Commissioner of Labor election
- November 7, 2006

Nominee	Lloyd Fields	Brenda Reneau
Party	Democratic	Republican
Popular vote	456,446	453,720
Percentage	50.15%	49.85%
- County results Fields: 50–60% 60–70% 70–80% Reneau: 50–60% 60–70% 70–80%
Commissioner of Labor before election
Brenda Reneau
Republican
Elected Commissioner of Labor
Lloyd Fields
Democratic

Incumbent Commissioner of labor Brenda Reneau ran for re-election, but was narrowly defeated by Democrat Lloyd Fields. With a margin of .2%, this was the closest statewide election.

Oklahoma Commissioner of Labor
Party	Candidate	Votes	%	±%
Democratic	Lloyd Fields	456,446	50.15	
Republican	Brenda Reneau (incumbent)	453,720	49.85	
Turnout		910,166	100.00	

== Insurance commissioner ==
2006 Oklahoma Insurance Commissioner election
- November 7, 2006
Nominee	Kim Holland	Bill Case
Party	Democratic	Republican
Popular vote	474,221	437,081
Percentage	52.04%	47.96%
- County results Holland: 50–60% 60–70% 70–80% Case: 50–60% 60–70% 70–80%
Insurance Commissioner before election
Kim Holland
Democratic
Elected Insurance Commissioner
Kim Holland
Democratic

Incumbent Insurance Commissioner Kim Holland ran for her first full term after being appointed to the position in 2005 by Oklahoma Governor Brad Henry. She defeated Republican candidate Bill Case with 52% of the vote to Case's 48%. As of the 2022 election, this is the last time a Democrat was elected as Oklahoma's Insurance Commissioner.

Candidate	Votes	%
Kim Holland	474,221	52.04%
Bill Case	437,081	47.96%

== Corporation commissioner ==
2006 Oklahoma Corporate Commissioner seat 2 election
- November 7, 2006
Nominee	Bob Anthony	Cody Graves
Party	Republican	Democratic
Popular vote	536,341	378,030
Percentage	58.7%	41.3%
- County results Anthony: 50–60% 60–70% 70–80% 80–90% Graves: 50–60% 60–70%
Commissioner before election
Bob Anthony
Republican
Elected Commissioner
Bob Anthony
Republican

Incumbent Republican Bob Anthony was re-elected to a six year term.

Candidate	Votes	%
Bob Anthony	536,341	58.66%
Cody Graves	378,030	41.34%

== U.S. representatives ==
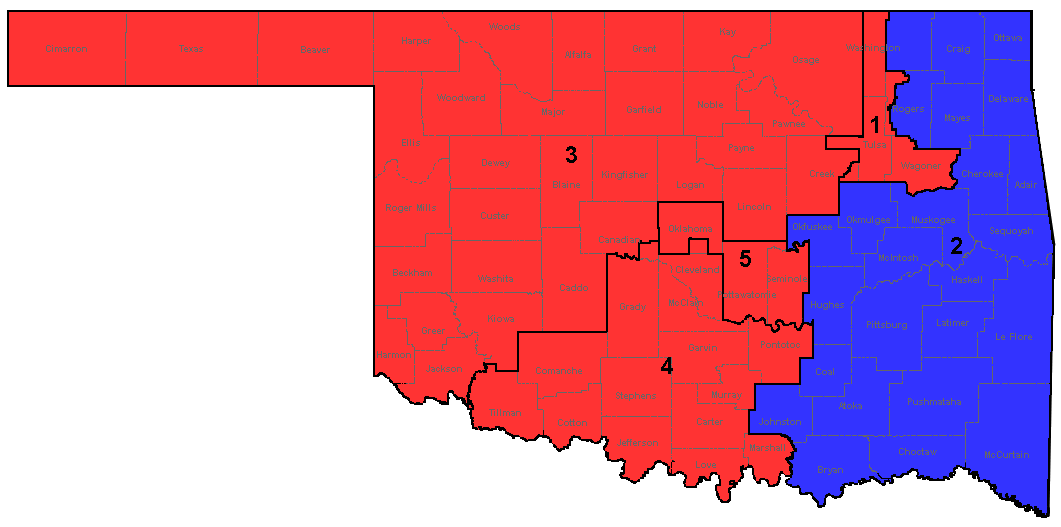

Candidate	Votes	%
District 1
John Sullivan	116,914	63.64%
Alan Gentges	56,721	30.87%
Bill Wortman	10,083	5.49%
District 2
Dan Boren	122,320	73.73%
Patrick K. Miller	45,853	27.27%
District 3
Frank D. Lucas	128,021	67.46%
Sue Barton	61,740	32.54%
District 4
Tom Cole	118,246	64.61%
Hal Spake	64,766	35.39%
District 5
Mary Fallin	108,914	60.38%
David Hunter	67,275	37.30%
Matthew Woodson	4,195	2.33%

== State representatives ==
Candidate	Votes	%
District 4
Mike Brown	6,284	82.48%
Matthew R. Jones	1,335	17.52%
District 6
Chuck Hoskin	6,333	60.95%
Wayland Smalley	4,057	39.05%
District 10
Steve Martin	4,774	53.87%
Kent Jeter	4,077	46.13%
District 14
George Faught	4,774	53.77%
Jeff Potts	4,104	46.23%
District 15
Ed Cannaday	6,675	77.17%
Ray Bond	1,975	22.83%
District 20
Paul D. Roan	5,260	59.65%
Johnny Sandmann	3,588	40.35%
District 23
Sue Tibbs	3,912	54.81%
Steve Gallo	3,226	45.19%
District 25
Todd Thomsen	4,798	50.01%
Darrell E. Nemecek	4,796	49.99%
District 26
Kris Steele	5,315	63.47%
Joe Freeman	3,095	36.53%
District 27
Shane Jett	5,347	60.51%
Ken Etchieson	3,490	39.49%
District 28
Ryan Dean Kiesel	5,454	63.86%
Billy Choate	3,087	36.14%
District 29
Skye McNiel	5,038	51.32%
Kathryn S. Thompson	4,778	48.68%
District 30
Mark McCullough	5,151	54.79%
Melinda Johnson Ryan	4,251	45.21%
District 31
Jason Murphey	6,544	57.12%
Thomas R. Cook	4,913	42.88%
District 32
Danny Morgan	7,705	71.59%
Carl Randall	3,058	28.41%
District 33
Lee R. Denney	'5,976	70.01%
Chad Swanson	2,560	29.99%
District 35
Rex Duncan	6,572	67.14%
Joe Vickers	3,216	32.86%
District 36
Scott N. Bighorse	4,828	52.94%
Eddie Fields	4,291	47.06%
District 37
Kenn Luttrell	5,184	55.71%
Stan Paynter	4,122	44.29%
District 40
Mike Jackson	6,120	73.14%
Pierce Jones	2,247	26.86%
District 41
John T. Enns	8,730	71.00%
Carol Ruth	3,566	29.00%
District 43
Colby Schwartz	6,902	64.66%
Earline Smaistrla	3,773	35.34%
District 44
Bill Nations	6,023	72.37%
Gary D. Caissie	2,299	27.63
District 45
Wallace Collins	5,359	50.42%
Thad Balkman	5,270	49.58%
District 46
Scott Martin	7,680	60.50%
Tom Robinson	5,014	39.50%

Candidate	Votes	%
District 49
Terry M. Hyman	5,307	63.28
Bettie D. Johnson	3,079	36.72%
District 50
Dennis Johnson	5,623	52.46%
Melvin Jones	5,095	47.54%
District 53
Randy Terrill	6,783	64.18%
Troy Green	3,786	35.82%
District 55
Ryan McMullen	6,262	67.01%
Charlie Wieland	3,083	32.99%
District 59
Rob Johnson	5,842	53.31%
Richie Oakes	4,399	40.14%
District 62
T.W. Shannon	3,845	58.32%
Janice Drewry	2,748	41.68%
District 64
Ann Coody	3,791	65.96%
Larry Jordan Jefferson	1,956	34.04%
District 69
Fred Jordan	8,119	75.48%
Cory N. Spogogee	2,638	24.52%
District 70
Ron Peters	8,334	66.31%
Mike Workman	4,234	33.69%
District 74
David Derby	6,476	57.45%
Wayne Guevara	4,352	38.61%
Bob Batterbee	445	3.95%
District 77
Eric Proctor	3,386	51.66%
Mark Liotta	3,169	51.66%
District 78
Jeannie McDaniel	5,378	53.13%
Jesse Guardiola	4,745	46.87%
District 80
Ron Peterson	7,287	71.25%
Kimberly Fobbs	2,940	28.75
District 83
Randy McDaniel	7,763	65.93%
Ed Holzberger	3,354	28.48%
George S. Farha	658	5.59%
District 85
David Dank	6,410	50.50%
Jennifer Seal	6,282	49.50%
District 87
Trebor Worthen	4,752	51.52%
Dana Orwig	4,472	48.48%
District 92
Richard D. Morrissette	3,209	62.40%
Michael Starega	1,934	37.60%
District 93
Al Lindley	2,823	50.77%
Mike Christian	2,737	49.23%
District 94
Scott Inman	4,269	54.20%
Rex Barrett	3,607	45.80%
District 95
Charlie Joyner	4,347	56.26%
Lee Roy Tucker	3,380	43.74%
District 96
Lance Cargill	8,542	67.84%
Abe Warren	4,050	32.16%
District 98
John Trebilcock	6,582	66.86%
Rae Weese	3,262	33.14%
District 99
Anastasia Pittman	4,886	76.85%
Willard Linzy	1,166	18.34%
J.M. Branum	306	4.81%

== State senators ==
Candidate	Votes	%
District 2
Sean Burrage	13,672	57.9%
Ami Shafer	9,924	42.06%
District 4
Kenneth Corn	12,588	78.40%
Thomas E. Lannigan	3,469	21.60%
District 10
Joe Sweeden	11,770	58.48%
Jamie Marie Sears	8,358	41.52%
District 12
Brian Bingman	10,665	52.65%
John Mark Young	9,593	47.35%
District 16
John Sparks	10,986	58.28%
Ron Davis	7,871	41.74%
District 18
Mary Easley	10,075	53.28%
Mark Wofford	8,835	46.72%
District 22
Mike Johnson	16,271	68.76%
Tom Gibson	7,392	31.24%

Candidate	Votes	%
District 24
Anthony Sykes	12,512	51.01%
Daisy Lawler	12,018	48.99%
District 26
Tom Ivester	9,383	50.74%
Todd Russ	9,110	49.26%
District 32
Randy Bass	7,827	63.34%
Ed Peterson	4,530	36.66%
District 34
Randy Brogdon	11,844	60.65%
James S. Ward	7,686	39.35%
District 36
Bill Brown	11,770	64.56%
Dennis Weese	6,461	35.44%
District 38
Mike Schulz	11,371	63.65%
Josh Woods	6,495	36.35%

== Judicial ==
=== District judges ===
Candidate	Votes	%
District 7, Office 1, Division 1
Kenneth Watson	7,516	57.78%
Malcolm Savage	5,492	42.22%
District 7, Office 10, Division 2
William D. Graves	24,934	53.42%
Susan Caswell	21,742	46.58%
District 7, Office 12, Division 4
Carolyn Ricks	35,163	71.1%
Kenneth Linn	14,292	28.90%
District 14, Office 4, Division 4
Dama Cantrell	14,804	62.22%
James Caputo	8,990	3778%
District 14, Office 8, Division 5
Gregg Graves	9,738	39.9%
P. Thomas Thornbrugh	14,666	60.1%

Candidate	Votes	%
District 4, Office 3
John Camp	13,797	36.59%
Dennis Hladik	23,913	63.41%
District 7, Office 7
Pat Crawly	69,175	48.82%
Vicki Robertson	72,507	51.18%
District 12, Office 2
Dale Marlar	17,233	49.76%
Dynda Post	17,402	50.24%
District 14, Office 1
Cliff Smith	54,113	46.31%
William Kellough	62,734	53.69%
District 14, Office 10
Mary Fitzgerald	67,438	57.02%
Deirdre Dexter	50,825	42.98%
District 14, Office 13
Deborah Shallcross	82,760	67.58%
Jonathan Sutton	39,702	32.42%
District 15, Office 3
John Sawney	20,246	42.27%
Jeff Payton	27,647	57.73%
District 16, Office 1
Danita Williams	7,743	50.46%
Marion Dale Fry	7,601	49.54%
District 24, Office 1
Dale Ray Gardner	10,808	41.17%
Douglas Golden	15,445	58.83%%
District 24, Office 5
Curt Allen	10,754	40.73%
Mike Claver	15,648	59.27%

=== Associate district judges ===
Candidate	Votes	%
Alfalfa County
Loren Angle	1,505	74.47%
David Cullen	516	25.53%
Choctaw County
James Wolfe	2,047	54.48%
Sue Buck	1,710	45.52%
Cotton County
Michael Flanagan	1,041	52.58%
Mark Clark	939	47.42%
Delaware County
Traci Cain	2,409	27.07%
Barry Denney	6,490	72.93%
Dewey County
Roger Foster	862	48.42%
Rick Bozarth	918	51.57%
Grady County
James Brunson	5,191	43.73%
John Herndon	6,680	56.27%
Jefferson County
Jon Tom Staton	1,198	69.45%
William Eakin	527	30.55%
Kingfisher County
Susie Pritchett	2,711	57.34%
E.A. Ard Gates	2,017	42.66%
Lincoln County
Sheila Kirk	5,826	59.26%
Craig Key	4,006	40.74%
McClain County
Suzanna Woodrow	4,634	49.85%
Charles Gray	4,661	50.15%

Candidate	Votes	%
McIntosh County
Jim Pratt	3,269	58.3%'
Cindy Dawson	2,338	41.7%
Marshall County
Millicent McClure Watson	1,151	35.27%
Richard Miller	2,112	64.73%
Oklahoma County
Richard Kirby	71,226	51.64%
Nan Patton	66,708	48.38%
Okmulgee County
Cynthia Pickering	3,048	34.44%
Duane Woodliff	5,801	65.56%
Pontotoc County
James R Rob Neal	4,270	46.73%
Martha Kilgore	4,868	53.27%
Tulsa County
Caroline Wall	57,505	49.56%
Dana Kuehn	58,529	50.44%
Washington County
Kevin Buchanan	6,953	49.04%
Russell Vaclaw	7,225	50.96%

== State questions ==
=== SQ 724 ===
This measure amends Article V, Section 21 of the State Constitution. That Section deals with State pay to legislators. The amendment restricts State pay to some legislators. The pay restriction would apply to some legislators while in jail or prison. The pay restriction would apply to legislators found guilty of a crime. It would also apply to legislators who plead either guilty or no contest. Affected legislators must return any State pay received for time while in jail or prison.

For - 87.78%
Against - 12.22%

Question 724 results by county Yes: 90–100%; 80–90%; 70–80%

=== SQ 725 ===
This measure amends the State Constitution. It amends Section 23 of Article 10. The measure deals with the Constitutional Reserve Fund also known as the Rainy Day Fund. The measure allows money to be spent from the Rainy Day Fund. The purpose of the authorized spending is to retain employment for state residents by helping at-risk manufacturers. Payments from the Fund would be used to encourage such manufacturers to make investments in Oklahoma. All such payments from the Fund must be unanimously approved by three State officers. Those officers are the Governor and the head of the Senate and House of Representatives. Those officers could only approve payments recommended by an independent committee. Such spending is allowed in years when there is Eighty Million Dollars or more in the Fund and other conditions are met. Such spending is limited to Ten Million Dollars a year. The help given to a manufacturer is limited to ten percent of its in-State capital investments. The Legislature could make laws to carry out the amendment.

For - 53.58%
Against - 46.42%

Question 725 results by county Yes: 50–60%; No: 50–60%; Tie: 50%

=== SQ 733 ===
State Question 733
- Oklahoma Repeal of Ban on Sale of Alcoholic Beverages on Election Day

Results
Choice	Votes	%
Yes	461,615	52.52%
No	417,377	47.48%
Total votes	878,992	100.00%
Yes
50–60%
No
60–70%
50–60%

This measure amends the Oklahoma Constitution. It amends Article 28. This Article deals with sales of alcoholic beverages. Section 6 of Article 28 bans the sale of alcoholic beverages by package stores on certain days. Package store sales of these beverages are prohibited on election days while the polls are open. This measure would remove the ban on sales on election days. If this measure passes, package stores could sell alcoholic beverages on election days.

For - 52.52%
Against - 47.48%

=== SQ 734 ===
This measure amends the Oklahoma Constitution. It amends Section 6A of Article 10. This section provides an exemption from property tax. The exemption applies to goods that are shipped into the state, but which do not remain in the state for more than ninety days. This is sometimes known as the freeport exemption. This measure would allow laws to be enacted. The laws could provide for an application process to claim this exemption. The laws could require the application to be filed by a certain date. The laws could require certain information to be included with the application. The application would be filed with the county assessor.

For - 63.10%
Against - 36.90%

Question 734 results by county Yes: 60–70%; 50–60%; No: 50–60%

== See also ==
- Government of Oklahoma
- Oklahoma House of Representatives
- Oklahoma Senate
- Politics of Oklahoma
- Oklahoma Congressional Districts
- 2006 Oklahoma Senate election
