= Drew Edmondson =

American lawyer (born 1946)

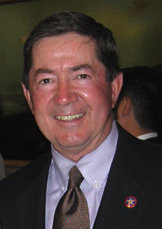

16th Attorney General of Oklahoma
- In office January 9, 1995 – January 10, 2011
- Governor: Frank Keating; Brad Henry
- Preceded by: Susan B. Loving
- Succeeded by: Scott Pruitt

District Attorney of Muskogee County
- In office January 1983 – April 1, 1992
- Preceded by: Mike Turpen
- Succeeded by: John Luton

Member of the Oklahoma House of Representatives from the 13th district
- In office January 7, 1975 – January 4, 1977
- Preceded by: George Miller
- Succeeded by: Jim Barker

Personal details
- Born: William Andrew Edmondson; October 12, 1946 (age 79) Washington, D.C., U.S.
- Party: Democratic
- Spouse: Linda Larason (m. 1967)
- Children: 2
- Relatives: Ed Edmondson (father); James E. Edmondson (brother); J. Howard Edmondson (uncle)
- Education: Northeastern State University (BA); University of Tulsa (JD)
- Website: Campaign website

Military service
- Allegiance: United States
- Branch/service: United States Navy
- Years of service: 1968–1972
- Battles/wars: Vietnam War

William Andrew Edmondson (born October 12, 1946) is an American lawyer and politician from the state of Oklahoma. A member of the Democratic Party, Edmondson served as the 16th Attorney General of Oklahoma from 1995 to 2011. Prior to his election as state attorney general, he served as district attorney for Muskogee County, Oklahoma, from 1983 to 1992. He was defeated twice in campaigns for U.S. Congress in Oklahoma's 2nd congressional district, where his father Ed Edmondson served from 1953 to 1973.

Edmondson was defeated twice in statewide races for Governor of Oklahoma. In 2010, Edmondson was defeated by Jari Askins in an unsuccessful bid for the Democratic Party nomination for governor. Following his service as attorney general, he joined the Oklahoma City law office of Riggs Abney. He was the Democratic nominee for governor in 2018, but was defeated by Republican nominee Kevin Stitt in the general election.

== Early life and career ==
Drew Edmondson was born in Washington, D.C., on October 12, 1946, and is the son of former U.S. Congressman Ed Edmondson and June Edmondson. He is also a nephew of former governor J. Howard Edmondson. His brother, James E. Edmondson is a justice of the Oklahoma Supreme Court. As a child, he grew up in Muskogee, Oklahoma, and Washington, D.C., and graduated from Muskogee High School in 1964. In 1968, he earned a B.A. in speech education from Northeastern State University, where he was a member of Phi Sigma Epsilon, now Phi Sigma Kappa fraternity.

== Career ==
From 1968 to 1972, Edmondson served in the United States Navy including a year of duty during the Vietnam War. From 1975 to 1977, he served one term in the Oklahoma House of Representatives. He graduated from the University of Tulsa Law School in 1978. That same year, he joined the Muskogee County District Attorney's Office as an intern and became an assistant district attorney the following year, serving under District Attorney Mike Turpen.

Following a brief stint in private practice with his brother James E. Edmondson, when incumbent District Attorney Mike Turpen stepped down to run for Attorney General of Oklahoma, Edmondson was elected as Muskogee County District Attorney in 1982. He was reelected without opposition in 1986 and 1990. As District Attorney, he personally prosecuted cases ranging from DUI to death penalty. He resigned halfway through his third term, to run for Congress in 1992.

=== 1992 Congressional campaign ===
Following a loss to Mike Synar in the 1980 primary election, Edmondson sought the second congressional district seat in the 1992 election. With backing from the NRA Political Victory Fund who had turned against the incumbent Synar, Edmondson again ran for Oklahoma's 2nd congressional district. After a heated campaign during which Synar criticized Edmondson for being soft on crime and for taking PAC money not just from the NRA but also from Big Tobacco and from out-of-state ranchers and Edmondson accused Synar of being ineffective on state economic problems and out of touch with his district as exemplified by his vote against authorizing the death penalty for drug dealers Edmondson finished with 38% to Synar's 43% in the primary election, forcing a runoff that Synar won with 53%.

In the 1992 campaign, Synar charged that Edmondson "was not a good District Attorney" and Muskogee County under Edmondson had given 90 convicted sex offenders no jail time. The specific case that commanded the most attention was that of Donald Lee Robertson who initially agreed to plead guilty to raping his ten-year-old cousin and received a two-year suspended sentence by Judge Jim Edmondson, Drew's brother. The light sentence became an issue and despite the questionable legality of reopening the case Robertson was persuaded to withdraw his plea and was put on trial, eventually being sentenced to 70 years in prison where he remains today.

=== Attorney general ===
Edmondson was elected as Oklahoma Attorney General in 1994. During his first term, he joined other state attorneys general in filing suit against the tobacco industry, successfully advocated for reform of the death penalty appeals process, and created a victim assistance unit. In 1998, he became the second Oklahoma Attorney General to win reelection unopposed. He was elected to a third term in 2002, defeating state Corporation Commissioner Denise Bode. During 2002–2003, he served as president of the National Association of Attorneys General. Notable cases investigated during his tenure as attorney general included the August 2003 indictment of WorldCom and its former CEO Bernard Ebbers on charges of violating state securities laws although the charges were later dropped following Ebbers's federal sentencing. Furthermore, he conducted a corruption investigation against then-State Insurance Commissioner Carroll Fisher, which resulted in Fisher's impeachment, resignation, and indictment on charges including embezzlement, tax evasion, perjury, and bribery.

In 2001, Edmondson became involved in a legal dispute with then-governor Frank Keating over the Governor's restructuring of his Cabinet, winning a state Supreme Court ruling that Keating had no authority to restructure his Cabinet without legislative approval in the case of Keating v. Edmondson.

When Oklahoma City Police Department chemist Joyce Gilchrist was accused of falsifying evidence in hundreds of cases, Attorney General Edmondson was asked to appoint independent counsel to investigate and refused to do so. In addition to having defended her work in appeals proceedings prior to the scandal, he made the decision that most of the death-penalty cases that depended upon her testimony did not need additional review.

In October 2007, Edmondson charged term limits and initiative rights activist Paul Jacob and two others on the grounds that they had illegally used out-of-state petitioners to collect signatures on a ballot initiative. In December 2008 the U.S. Court of Appeals for the Tenth Circuit struck down the underlying Oklahoma law that barred out-of-state petition circulators, ruling that it violated the First Amendment. The attorney general's office dismissed the charges against Jacob and the other defendants in January 2009, with Edmondson saying "The statute under which these defendants were charged has been declared unconstitutional, and the appellate process is complete...The statute is no longer enforceable."

Edmondson was elected to a fourth term in the 2006 election, running against Republican James Dunn. He did not seek reelection to a fifth term in 2010, choosing instead to run for governor and eventually losing in the primary to Lieutenant Governor Jari Askins. Due to term limits passed in a statewide referendum in 2010, Edmondson's record of 16 years in office as Oklahoma State Attorney General will most likely be unbroken.

=== 2010 gubernatorial election ===
Edmondson announced on June 10, 2009, his candidancy for Governor of Oklahoma. On July 27, 2010, Lieutenant Governor Jari Askins "edged Attorney General Drew Edmondson in the Democratic primary by fewer than six-tenths of 1 percent—about 1,500 votes—with all but three of the state's 2,244 precincts reporting unofficial results." "Edmondson threw his support to Askins in a concession speech that resolved a tightly run contest.

In the speech, Edmondson stated, "To her credit and mine, this primary has been one on the issues, on the record, clean, positive, straightforward. ... I think it will be written down in the history books as a testament to both Jari Askins and Drew Edmondson that the Democratic Party comes out of this primary united and unfractured and ready to win this state."

=== 2018 gubernatorial election ===
On May 1, 2017, Edmondson announced his second run for Governor of Oklahoma. In the Democratic primary he initially faced competition from state house minority leader Scott Inman, and former state senator Connie Johnson. However, on October 25 Inman dropped out of the race, leaving Edmondson and Johnson as the two candidates. Polling had Edmondson in a significant lead over Johnson for the primary. On June 26, 2018, Edmondson won the Democratic nomination over Johnson, 61%–39%. On November 6, 2018, he lost to Republican nominee and Tulsa businessman Kevin Stitt.

== Personal life ==
While a college student, Edmondson married Linda Larason of Fargo, Oklahoma. The couple has two children.

== Awards and honors ==
On March 6, 2009, Edmondson was honored by his alma mater Northeastern State University with a 100 Centurion award. This award was given to 100 individuals that have had a positive impact on the NSU community in the last 100 years.

== Electoral history ==
=== Attorney General elections ===
Oklahoma Attorney General election, 1994 Democratic primary
Party	Candidate	Votes	%
Democratic	Drew Edmondson	253,058	61.13
Democratic	L. Fred Collins	87,091	21.04
Democratic	John B. Nicks	73,819	17.83
Total votes		413,968	100.0

Oklahoma Attorney General election, 1994
Party	Candidate	Votes	%
Democratic	Drew Edmondson	507,039	52.16%
Republican	Mike Hunter	465,031	47.84%
Total votes		972,800	100.0

Oklahoma Attorney General election, 2002
Party	Candidate	Votes	%
Democratic	Drew Edmondson	615,932	60.10%
Republican	Denise Bode	408,833	39.90%
Total votes		1,024,765	100.0

Oklahoma Attorney General election, 2006
Party	Candidate	Votes	%
Democratic	Drew Edmondson	563,364	61.19%
Republican	Jim Dunn	357,267	38.81%
Total votes		920,631	100.0

=== Gubernatorial elections ===
2010 Oklahoma gubernatorial election Democratic primary results
Party	Candidate	Votes	%
Democratic	Jari Askins	132,591	50.28
Democratic	Drew Edmondson	131,097	49.72
Total votes		263,688	100.00

2018 Oklahoma gubernatorial election Democratic primary
Party	Candidate	Votes	%
Democratic	Drew Edmondson	242,764	61.4
Democratic	Connie Johnson	152,730	38.6
Total votes		395,494	100.0

== Edmondson Family ==
The Edmondson family is well known for running for office and election participation within their families in Oklahoma political history.

Drew Edmondson is the son of Ed Edmondson, a former U.S. congressman from Oklahoma who served from 1952 to 1972; the nephew of J.Howard Edmondson, a former Oklahoma governor and U.S. Senator who served in Oklahoma politics from 1954 to 1964; and the brother of James E. Edmondson, a current Justice on the Oklahoma Supreme Court.

In 1995, Edmondson's niece, Sarah Edmondson participated in a "Natural Born Killers" copycat crime spree with her boyfriend, Benjamin James Darras. The couple committed murder and robbery in Mississippi, and a robbery and attempted murder in Louisiana. In November 1998, Sarah Edmondson was sentenced to 35-years in prison for her role in the crime spree. On May 14, 2010, she was released on parole in Oklahoma.

Party political offices
Preceded by Robert Harlan Henry	Democratic nominee for Attorney General of Oklahoma; 1994, 1998, 2002, 2006	Succeeded by Jim Priest
Preceded by Joe Dorman	Democratic nominee for Governor of Oklahoma; 2018	Succeeded by Joy Hofmeister
Legal offices
Preceded by Susan B. Loving	Attorney General of Oklahoma; 1995–2011	Succeeded by Scott Pruitt
