= Gerald Grimes =

American politician

8th Insurance Commissioner of Oklahoma
- In office 1975–1991
- Governor: David Boren; George Nigh; Henry Bellmon
- Preceded by: Joe B. Hunt
- Succeeded by: Cathy Weatherford

Personal details
- Born: Robert Gerald Grimes; 1940/1941; Oklahoma City, Oklahoma, U.S.
- Died: November 2023 (aged 82); Oklahoma City, Oklahoma, U.S.
- Political party: Democratic
- Education: University of Central Oklahoma

Gerald Grimes was an American politician who served as the Oklahoma Insurance Commissioner from 1975 until 1991.

== Biography ==
Grimes was born Robert Gerald Grimes in Oklahoma City to Robert Weldon Grimes and Lucille Bivins. He later graduate of Southeast High School and the University of Central Oklahoma.

He spent his career in the insurance industry, starting at the Hartford Insurance Company before joining the Oklahoma Insurance Department in 1970. In 1975, following the death of Commissioner Joe B. Hunt, Governor David Boren appointed Grimes as the 8th Oklahoma Insurance Commissioner. He was a member of the Democratic Party.

He died in November 2023.

Party political offices
Preceded by Joe B. Hunt	Democratic nominee for Insurance Commissioner of Oklahoma; 1978, 1982, 1986, 1990	Succeeded by Carroll Fisher
