= 2002 Oklahoma Attorney General election =

- November 5, 2002
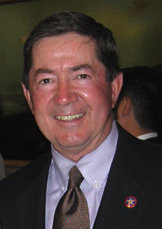

Nominee	Drew Edmondson	Denise Bode
Party	Democratic	Republican
Popular vote	615,932	408,833
Percentage	60.10%	39.90%
- County results Edmondson: 50–60% 60–70% 70–80% Bode: 50–60% 60–70%
Attorney General before election
Drew Edmondson
Democratic
Elected Attorney General
Drew Edmondson
Democratic

The 2002 Oklahoma Attorney General election was held on November 5, 2002, to elect the Oklahoma Attorney General, concurrently with elections to the United States Senate, U.S. House of Representatives, governor, and other state and local elections. Primary elections were held on August 27, 2002, with runoff elections held on September 17 in races where no single candidate cleared at least 50% of the vote.

Incumbent Democratic attorney general Drew Edmondson ran for re-election to a third term in office, despite speculation that he was considering a run for governor. Edmondson defeated Republican Corporation Commissioner Denise Bode in the general election.

== Democratic primary ==
=== Candidates ===
==== Nominee ====
- Drew Edmondson, incumbent attorney general (1995–present)

=== Results ===
Democratic primary results
Party	Candidate	Votes	%
Democratic	Drew Edmondson (incumbent)	Unopposed	
Total votes		—N/a	100.0

== Republican primary ==
=== Candidates ===
==== Nominee ====
- Denise Bode, member of the Oklahoma Corporation Commission (1997–present)

==== Eliminated in primary ====
- Tim Green, attorney

=== Results ===
Republican primary results
Party	Candidate	Votes	%
Republican	Denise Bode	119,245	59.28
Republican	Tim Green	81,912	40.72
Total votes		201,157	100.0

== General election ==
=== Post-primary endorsements ===
Drew Edmondson (D)

Organizations

- NRA Political Victory Fund

=== Results ===
2002 Oklahoma Attorney General election
Party	Candidate	Votes	%
Democratic	Drew Edmondson (incumbent)	615,932	60.10
Republican	Denise Bode	408,833	39.90
Total votes		1,024,765	100.0
Democratic hold			
