= Kim Holland =

American politician

Oklahoma Insurance Commissioner
- In office 2005 – January 10, 2011
- Governor: Brad Henry
- Preceded by: Carroll Fisher
- Succeeded by: John D. Doak

Personal details
- Born: August 6, 1955 (age 70)
- Party: Democratic

Kim Holland (born August 6, 1955) is an American politician and insurance professional from the U.S. state of Oklahoma.

She was appointed Oklahoma Insurance Commissioner, the second woman to serve, by Governor Brad Henry in 2005, following the impeachment and resignation of her predecessor, Carroll Fisher. She was re-elected in 2006 to a full four-year term but, standing for re-election in the November 2010 general election, she was defeated by Republican John D. Doak.

== 2006 election ==
After her appointment in 2005, Holland faced a tough challenge from Bill Case, a former state representative, in 2006. Case trailed behind Holland in fundraising, raising $135,244 to Holland's $717,000 by the end of October.

During the election an independent group known as "Just the Facts America" launched a blistering attack upon Holland on television, citing her lack of a college education and legal insurance industry contributions to Holland's campaign. It was later revealed that "Just the Facts America" was a cover name for an attack organization of an interesting ethical persuasion largely subsidized by Texas businessman Gene Phillips, whom Holland has often opposed.

In the end, Holland was able to collect 52 percent of the votes to carry the election.

== Insurance Commissioner ==
=== Medicare ===
In May 2007, Holland made national headlines with her market conduct exam on Humana, a large provider of Medicare supplemental insurance. Holland's market conduct exam proved widespread misconduct by agents working for Humana, including that consumers were enrolled in Humana products that "they did not understand and did not want". Holland was called to testify before the United States Senate Committee on Aging, saying "As insurance commissioner, I currently have greater authority to address a consumer's problem with pet insurance than I do protecting the half a million Oklahoma senior citizens covered under a Medicare Prescription Drug or Advantage plan".

Holland's is the first major investigation of its type against a company selling Medicare-related products.

=== Robocalls ===
On April 21, 2009, Holland issued an Emergency Cease and Desist Order against Vehicle Services Inc. (VSI) for attempting to sell insurance products in violation of Oklahoma law, according to the order. Holland initiated an investigation after the company randomly called an Insurance Department Anti-Fraud Investigator at her home. VSI was robocalling random numbers in Oklahoma and other states without checking if numbers were on a "do not call" list, or cell phones.

"Our primary responsibility is to protect the citizens and policyholders of our state, and it is a role I take very seriously," said Holland. "Insurers are required by law to register and maintain a license in order to do business in Oklahoma.

Shortly after the action, other states began taking action against VSI. On May 11, 2009, Senator Chuck Schumer of New York requested a federal investigation against the company.

=== 2010 ===
Holland was defeated in the November 2010 general election by Republican John D. Doak, who assumed office on January 10, 2011.

== Election results ==
Candidate	Votes	%
Kim Holland	474,221	52.04%
Bill Case	437,081	47.96%

Party political offices
Preceded by Carroll Fisher	Democratic nominee for Insurance Commissioner of Oklahoma; 2006, 2010	Vacant Title next held by Kimberly Fobbs
