= 1927 Oklahoma impeachment effort =

On December 12, 1927, the Oklahoma House of Representatives met in a self-called special session and voted to impeach three oficials: Henry S. Johnston (governor), Fred P. Branson (chief justice of the Supreme Court), and Harry Cordell (commissioner of agriculture). The validity of the impeachment votes was contested, however, as the Oklahoma Supreme Court had days before the vote ruled that the Oklahoma Legislature lacked the authority to call itself into a special session. On December 29, the Oklahoma Senate voted to judge all three impeachments as void.

== Background ==
=== Election of Governor Johnston in 1926 ===
In 1926, incumbent governor Martin Edwin Trapp (who had taken office after the 1923 impeachment of Governor John C. Walton) was prohibited by state courts from running for a full term. It was held that the state constitution's prohibition on election to multiple consecutive gubernatorial terms applied to him and the partial term he was serving as governor. Henry S. Johnston was elected, winning the Democratic primary and general elections with support of the Ku Klux Klan, which publicly aligned himself with. However, his Democratic primary victory had been secured by a narrow margin in a multi-candidate race. He entered office with fierce opposition from several political camps. This included camps with representation in his own party, including those aligned with the losing gubernatorial contenders, the anti-Klan camp, and political adversaries of his personal secretary O. O. Hammonds. Disapproval of Mrs. Hammonds would ultimately prove a prime motivation behind the effort to impeach Johnston.

=== Controversy surrounding Jess Pullen ===
In late February 1927 (only weeks into Johnston's term), Senator Jess Pullen (a Democrat) introduced a resolution in the Senate demanding that Hammonds resign as the governor's personnel secretary, deriding her as the female "Colonel House of Oklahoma". Hammonds rebuked this effort to force her to resign her office. Pullen accused Hammonds of guarding access to the governor away from state legislators in a manner that immensely impeded their ability to conduct the state's business, while Hammonds asserted she was aiding the governor in running an efficient administration of state business.

== Early impeachment process and legal conflict ==
The House desired to meet in special session to investigate the governor and his administration, with consideration of possible impeachment. Governor Johnston refused to call a special session. The House therefore decided to call itself into special session. As the House began preparing to impeach Johnston, Justice Branson authored a Supreme Court ruling that Measure 79 (the statute adopted by voters in 1923 to allow the legislature to call itself into session) had not been ratified because neither the legislature nor governor had approved its referral to voters. The ruling therefore held that the state constitution did not grant the legislature the power to call itself into session. This meant that any impeachment adopted during the self-called special session was to be considered unconstitutional since the governor had not called for the special session. The House disregarded this and proceeded with its plans. In advance of a House vote, the governor secured a temporary district court injunction against the effort to impeach him in special session. Nevertheless, the House of Representatives proceeded with the effort.

== Adoption of articles of impeachment on December 12 ==
Despite adverse court rulings, on December 12 and the House met in special session at a hotel in the capital city and voted to adopt articles of impeachment not only against Johnston and Cordell, but also against Chief Justice Branson. Governor Johnston's impeachment featured six charges that alleged intimidation of the commonwealth by National Guard troops, acts against the public good, as well as felony and misdemeanor acts. Cordell's impeachment alleged corrupt practice (in his hiring of 75 livestock inspectors) as well as incompetency. Chief Justice Branson's impeachment alleged corruption in office. It alleged that Branson had acted corruptly in regards to a Supreme Court decision on State Measure 79. It alleged that he had prepared an opinion declaring the measure illegal in advance on December 2, and then rushed it through the conference, acting with prejudice in the case in an effort to halt the House from convening an emergency session. It alleged that this was done with the intent of protecting himself. It also alleged that his offer to the House of allowing the court to have an opportunity to reconsider its opinion was intended to earn favor with the House and placate the House for the purposes of his own protection from impeachment.

== Pre-trial developments ==
The validity of impeachment vote challenged in courts. Despite an adverse Supreme Court ruling, the Senate proceeded to meet and arrange itself to hold impeachment trials. On December 14, the Senate voted 23–12 to affirm that it held the power to meet as a court of impeachment. The House's board of impeachment managers then presented the articles of impeachment, and the Senate adopted an order to receive the articles.

During their December 14 session, the Senate opted to forgo immediately suspending any of the impeached officials from their offices. The decision not to immediately invoke their power to suspend impeached officials pending the outcome of their impeachment trial was taken to avoid creating an immediate constitutional crisis. Since the legality of the impeachments was subject to legal dispute, there was a fear that there would be competing claims made to the powers of the governor's office if the Senate voted to suspend Governor Johnston (and thereby elevate Lieutenant Governor William J. Holloway to acting governor) but Johnston refused to recognize his suspension as legitimate. To delay any such crisis, the Senate opted postpone this, adopting the rule that would instead only suspend the officers upon the start of their trials. Senator Tom Anglin (a Democrat) had delivered a passionate speech to the Senate against suspending the governor, warning that doing so would result in dual claims to the governorship, causing a "serious condition unparalleled and continuing for months" during which the executive branch departments would be unable to function.

On December 15, the Senate organized itself to convene as a court of impeachment, setting stage for impeachment trials to be held. It also decided that Senate President Pro Tempore Mac Q. Williamson (a Democrat) would serve as presiding officer during the impeachment trials. Governor Johnston threatened that leaders of the legislature would face contempt proceedings if they convened again in violation of the district court junction prohibiting them from convening in their self-called special session. This would have included the Senate reconvening as a court of impeachment.

After the impeachment, the House committee running the inquiry held an additional open hearing about the governor's conduct in office with testimony from several witnesses. On the evening of December 16, the committee referred an additional article of impeachment against Johnston to the House. The recommended additional article alleged, among other things, "moral turpitude" and general incompetence.

On December 24, summons were delivered to the homes of the three officials to appear provide answer to the impeachment plea or otherwise plead guilty, and to appear before the Senate when it was to reconvene as a court of impeachment on December 28. The summons were signed by W. G. McAllister (the secretary of the Senate). Personal service was made to both Branson and Cordell. Johnston was not present at the residence that his summons was delivered to (the one he had been living in when serving as governor), having amid the impeachment furor instead returned to living at his pre-gubernatorial residence in Perry. Governor Johnston acknowledged to the press on December 26th that he was aware that such notice had indeed been left at his gubernatorial residence on December 24, but noted that it had been left without personal service. The Associated Press reported that sources close Johnston believed that the governor would not file pleadings before the Senate due to his belief that the impeachment was illegal and therefore the Senate was not able to legally convene as a court of impeachment.

== Senate judgement of the impeachments as void ==
On December 29, the Senate judged the impeachment articles against each of the three officials to be void. This came in a 22–16 vote of senators during a late night conference of the Senate held at the Hotel Huckins. They had seen competing motions introduced by senators. Senator Guy L. Andrews (a Democrat) introduced the motion that successfully ended the impeachments. A competing motion to suspend Johnston from office pending the outcome of an impeachment trial had been introduced by Senator Lester E. Smith (also a Democrat).

== Aftermath ==
=== 1929 impeachment and removal of Johnston ===
Due to the governor's refusal to call a special session, the state legislature would ultimately not be able to convene again until the start of its next term in January 1929. However, those thirteen months only hardened their resolve to oppose Governor Johnston and his administration. Johnston would be again impeached in 1929, this time being convicted and removed from office on March 21, 1929 for a charge of "general incompetence."
