= John D. Doak =

American politician

John Doak

Insurance Commissioner of Oklahoma
- In office January 10, 2011 – January 14, 2019
- Governor: Kevin Stitt
- Preceded by: Kim Holland
- Succeeded by: Glen Mulready

Personal details
- Party: Republican
- Spouse: Debby
- Children: 2
- Education: University of Oklahoma (BA)

John D. Doak is an American Republican politician from Oklahoma who served as the 12th Oklahoma Insurance Commissioner.

== Biography ==
After graduating from the University of Oklahoma in 1988 with a Bachelor of Arts degree in political science, Doak launched a branch of the Farmers Insurance Group in Tulsa, Oklahoma. Doak would later leave Farmers to work for various other insurance companies, eventually being promoted to corporate level positions. Doak is a former board member for the Tulsa Ronald McDonald House, the Tulsa Opera, and Dillon International Adoption Agency. He previously served as a member of the Oklahoma Governor's Round Table for Business Development.

Doak was elected as Insurance Commissioner in 2010, defeating incumbent Democratic opponent Kim Holland.

== Personal life ==
John Doak and his wife, Debby, live in Tulsa with their two children, Kasey and Zack.

== Electoral history ==
Oklahoma Insurance Commissioner Republican Primary Election, 2010
Party	Candidate	Votes	%
Republican	John Crawford	92,924	41.68
Republican	John Doak	87,274	39.14
Republican	Mark Croucher	42,772	19.18

Oklahoma Insurance Commissioner Republican Primary Runoff Election, 2010
Party	Candidate	Votes	%
Republican	John Doak	84,573	70.56
Republican	John Crawford	35,295	29.44

Oklahoma Insurance Commissioner Election, 2010
Party	Candidate	Votes	%
Republican	John Doak	555,740	54.48
Democratic	Kim Holland (inc.)	464,310	45.52

Oklahoma Insurance Commissioner Republican Primary Election, 2014
Party	Candidate	Votes	%
Republican	John Doak (inc.)	189,893	77.50
Republican	Bill Viner	55,173	22.50

Oklahoma Insurance Commissioner Election, 2014
Party	Candidate	Votes	%
Republican	John Doak (inc.)	n/a	100.00

Party political offices
Preceded by Bill Case	Republican nominee for Insurance Commissioner of Oklahoma; 2010, 2014	Succeeded by Glen Mulready
Political offices
Preceded by Kim Holland	Insurance Commissioner of Oklahoma; 2011–2019	Succeeded by Glen Mulready
