= 2002 Oklahoma elections =

- November 5, 2002

The 2002 Oklahoma state elections were held on November 5, 2002. The primary election was held on July 23. The runoff primary election was held on August 27.

== Overview ==
Executive branch before election

Office	Current officer	Party
Governor	Frank Keating	Republican
Lieutenant Governor	Mary Fallin	Republican
State Auditor and Inspector	Jeff McMahan	Democratic
Attorney General	Drew Edmondson	Democratic
State Treasurer	Robert Butkin	Democratic
State School Superintendent	Sandy Garrett	Democratic
Labor Commissioner	Brenda Reneau	Republican
Insurance Commissioner	Carroll Fisher	Democratic
Corporation Commissioner	Ed Apple	Republican

Legislature before election

House	Democrats	Republicans
Oklahoma Senate	30	18
Oklahoma House of Representatives	53	48

Executive branch after election

Office	Current officer	Party
Governor	Brad Henry	Democratic
Lieutenant Governor	Mary Fallin	Republican
State Auditor and Inspector	Jeff McMahan	Democratic
Attorney General	Drew Edmondson	Democratic
State Treasurer	Scott Meacham	Democratic
State School Superintendent	Sandy Garrett	Democratic
Labor Commissioner	Brenda Reneau	Republican
Insurance Commissioner	Carroll Fisher	Democratic
Corporation Commissioner	Jeff Cloud	Republican

Legislature after election

House	Democrats	Republicans
Oklahoma Senate	28	20
Oklahoma House of Representatives	53	48

== See also ==
- Government of Oklahoma
- Oklahoma House of Representatives
- Oklahoma Senate
- Politics of Oklahoma
- Oklahoma Congressional Districts
