= Bill Case (Oklahoma politician) =

American politician

Member of the Oklahoma House of Representatives from the 95th district
- In office November 1994 – November 2006
- Preceded by: Jim Isaac
- Succeeded by: Charlie Joyner

Mayor of Midwest City, Oklahoma
- In office 1992–1993
- Preceded by: John Johnson
- Succeeded by: Eddie Reed

Midwest City City Councillor for Ward 5
- In office 1990–1994

Personal details
- Born: December 10, 1954 (age 71) Akron, Ohio, U.S.
- Party: Republican
- Education: Appalachian State University

Bill Case is an American politician who served in the Oklahoma House of Representatives representing the 95th district from 1994 to 2006. He previously served as the mayor of Midwest City, Oklahoma from 1992 to 1993, and on the Midwest City city council from 1990 to 1994.

In 2006, he was the Republican Party nominee for Oklahoma Insurance Commissioner.

== Biography ==
Bill Case was born on December 10, 1954, in Akron, Ohio, and graduated from Appalachian State University in 1977. In 1990, he was elected to the Midwest City, Oklahoma city council representing Ward 5 and he served in that position until 1994. He also served as the mayor of Midwest City from 1992 to 1993. He served in the Oklahoma House of Representatives as a member of the Republican Party representing the 95th district from 1994 to 2006. He was preceded in office by Jim Isaac. In 2005, he supported repealing a bill that protected municipal employees in Oklahoma right to unionize.

In the 2006 Oklahoma elections, he ran for Oklahoma Insurance Commissioner. He was the Republican nominee against incumbent the Democratic Commissioner Kim Holland. In 2008 and 2025, he was working as a lobbyist.
