= Oklahoma Department of Insurance =

Oklahoma Insurance Department
Agency overview
- Formed: 1907
- Headquarters: 400 NE 50th Street; Oklahoma City, Oklahoma
- Employees: 121 unclassified
- Minister responsible: Insurance Commissioner
- Agency executive: Glen Mulready, Insurance Commissioner
- Website: www.oid.ok.gov

The Oklahoma Insurance Department (OID) is an agency of the state of Oklahoma under the Oklahoma Insurance Commissioner, a statewide elected official. The Oklahoma Insurance Department is responsible for supervising and regulating all insurance business in Oklahoma.

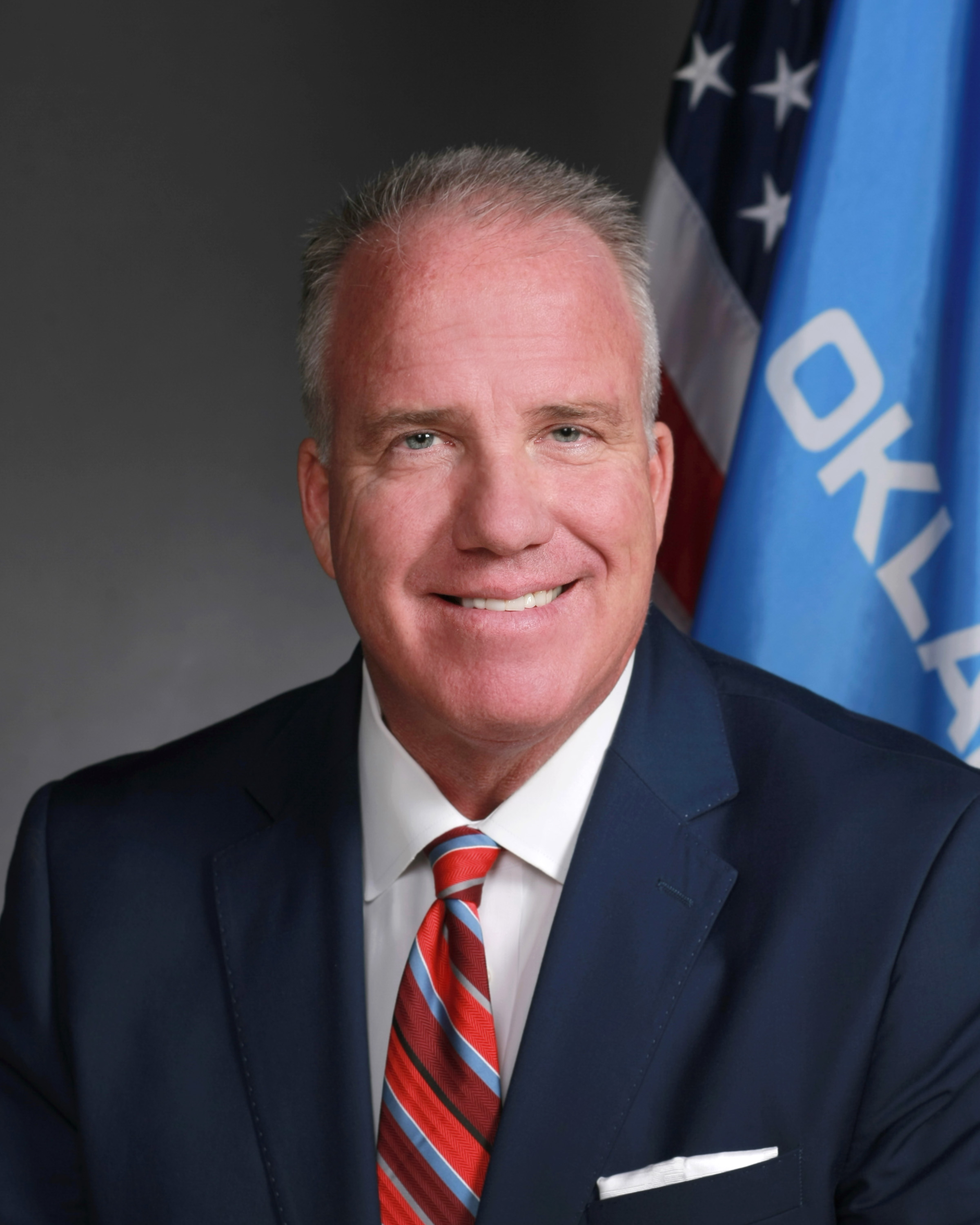
Oklahoma Insurance Commissioner Glen Mulready

The current Insurance Commissioner is Glen Mulready. Glen Mulready was sworn in as Oklahoma's 13th Insurance Commissioner on January 14, 2019.

== Responsibilities ==
The Oklahoma Insurance Department is responsible for regulating and reviewing all insurance companies within Oklahoma to make sure they are solvent and comply with all insurance laws and regulations. The department also educates consumers about insurance by publishing information, providing rate guides on homeowners and auto insurance, hosting community events and answering general insurance inquiries. The OID is also responsible for helping consumers when they have disputes with insurance companies.

Another duty of the department is to register and license agents who sell insurance products. The department also requires agents to meet ongoing continuing education requirements. Other professions regulated by the department include bail bond professionals, real estate appraisers, funeral directors, and insurance adjusters.

Another duty of the department is to register and license service contract providers.

== Budget ==
The revenue for Oklahoma Insurance Department's budget is generated from the fees associated with the licenses. Since 2016, the OID has been non appropriated. According to the OID's 2018 Annual Report, the department's operations have produced $46.5 million to be given back to the State of Oklahoma budget for use by other state agencies.

== Organization ==
- Insurance Commissioner
  - Deputy Insurance Commissioner
    - Anti-Fraud Unit - investigates insurance-related crimes and regulatory violations; educates the public about insurance fraud
    - Bail Bond Division - licenses, regulates and supervises all bail bond professionals
    - Consumer Assistance/Claims Division - investigates all complaints lodged against insurance companies by the public; answers general insurance questions and educates policyholders through various of outreach efforts
    - Communications Division - handles media relations, public relations, crisis communications, employee communications, and event planning
    - Comptroller Division - manages the internal fiscal affairs of the Department
    - Insurance Service Office - evaluates, educates and helps fire departments throughout the state improve their ISO rating.
    - Financial Division - monitors the financial condition of all domestic and foreign insurance companies operating in Oklahoma; oversees securities deposited by domestic insurance companies; and performs market conduct examinations and financial examinations of insurance companies and regulated entities
    - Public Policy Division - works closely with state lawmakers to represent the interests of the OID at the State Capitol
    - Legal Division - responsible for providing internal legal advice to the department and prosecuting violations of the insurance laws
    - Medicare Assistance Program - provides counseling and assistance on Medicare and other related health coverage plans
    - Producer Licensing & Education Division - responsible for licensing of resident and non-resident agents and adjusters to ensure they meet all legal requirements; responsible for administering and regulating continuing education credits
    - Rate and Form Division - responsible for approving all life, accident, health, property, marine, vehicle and casualty insurance products to ensuring policies and rates are in compliance with the law
    - Real Estate Appraiser Board - ensures that appraisers and appraisal management companies meet federal requirements; supervises continuing education

== Staffing ==
The Oklahoma Insurance Department, for fiscal year 2018, was authorized 121 full-time employees.

Activity	Number of Employees
Executive	3
Operations	23
Regulatory	87
Real Estate Appraiser Board	3
Medicare Assistance Program	5
Total	121

== See also ==
- Oklahoma Insurance Commissioner
- Governor of Oklahoma
