= Walter Davis Humphrey =

American attorney and politician

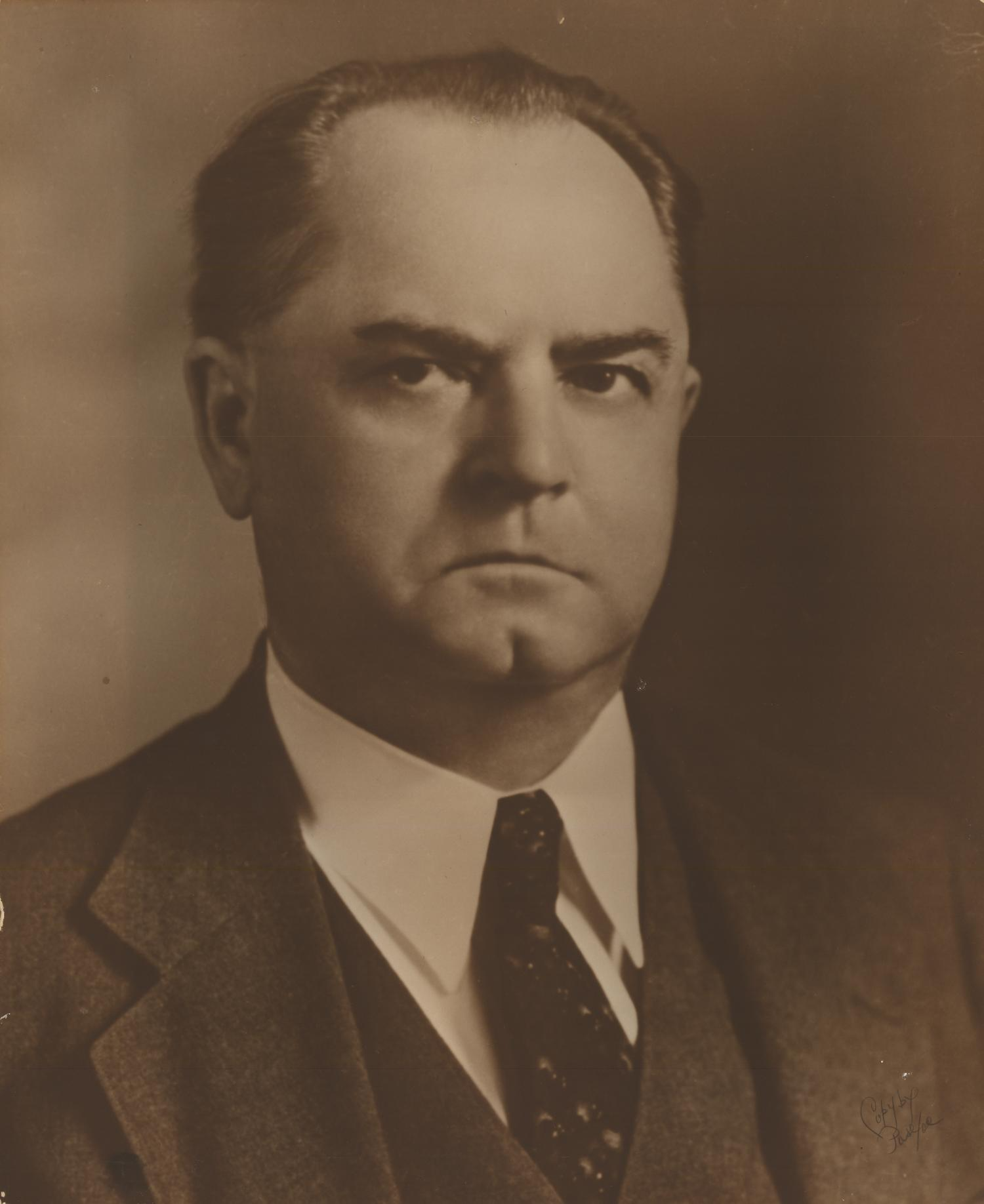
- Humphrey pictured sometime between 1915 and 1918

Oklahoma Tax Commissioner
- In office 1931–1935
- Governor: William H. Murray

Oklahoma Corporation Commissioner
- In office 1915–1919
- Appointed by: Robert L. Williams (Note: Initially appointed to fill a vacancy, Humphrey won reelection in 1916.)
- Preceded by: A. P. Watson
- Succeeded by: R. E. Echols

Mayor of Nowata
- In office April 1903 – 1906

Personal details
- Born: 1876 Richlands, North Carolina
- Died: August 1, 1942 Tulsa, Oklahoma
- Party: Democratic Party

Walter Davis Humphrey was an American attorney and politician who served as a member of the Oklahoma Constitutional Convention, Mayor of Nowata, Oklahoma Corporation Commissioner, and Oklahoma Tax Commissioner in the early 20th century.

== Early life, mayoral term, and Oklahoma Constitutional Convention ==
Walter Davis Humphrey was born in 1876 to George Franklin Humphrey and Marenda Anne Thomas in Richlands, North Carolina. He moved to Indian Territory, read the law under Wade H. Kornegay in Vinita, and was admitted to the Oklahoma Bar Association in 1901. He moved to Nowata the next year and was elected mayor in April 1903 where he served until 1906. He was a member of the Oklahoma Constitutional Convention representing the 58th district. He married Eva Sudderth on June 20, 1906.

== Oklahoma politics ==
Humphrey was appointed by Robert L. Williams to replace A. P. Watson on the Oklahoma Corporation Commission after Watson's impeachment in 1915. He was reelected in 1916 and resigned in 1919. He operated a private practice in Tulsa between 1921 and 1931, when he was appointed by William H. Murray to the Oklahoma Tax Commission. He left office in 1935 to work as an examiner and attorney for the Federal Communications Commission in Washington D.C. and died in Tulsa on August 1, 1942. He was buried in Tulsa's Memorial Park Cemetery.
