= Milas Lasater =

American politician

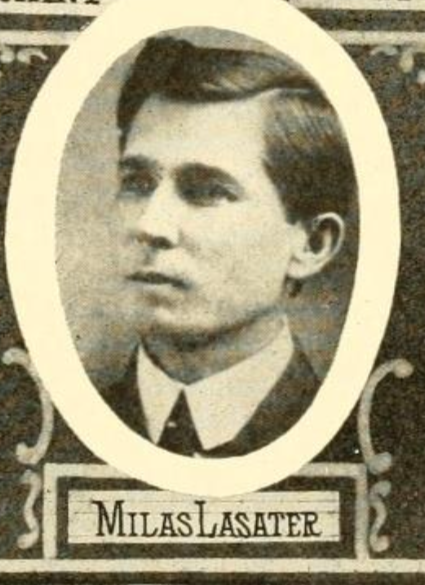

2nd Oklahoma Insurance Commissioner
- In office November 30, 1909 – January 1911
- Appointed by: Charles N. Haskell
- Preceded by: T. J. McComb
- Succeeded by: P. A. Ballard

Personal details
- Born: January 8, 1872; Palo Pinto County, Texas, US
- Died: March 11, 1929 (aged 57); Wichita, Kansas, US
- Political party: Democratic Party
- Spouse: Sarah Waite (m. 1895)
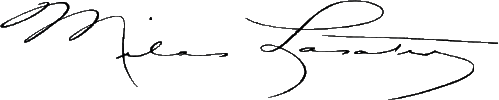
- Signature

Milas Lasater (1872–1929) was an American politician who served as the 2nd Oklahoma Insurance Commissioner from 1909 to 1911.

== Biography ==
Milas Lasater was born near Oran in Palo Pinto County, Texas on January 8, 1872. His family moved between Texas, Tennessee, and Indiana. He settled in Wynnewood, Indian Territory in 1892.

He married Sarah Waite on December 4, 1895.

He was a member of the Democratic Party and the Sequoyah Constitutional Convention. He was appointed Oklahoma Insurance Commissioner on November 30, 1909, after the resignation of T. J. McComb. He lost the 1910 Democratic primary to P. A. Ballard.

He died at his home in Wichita, Kansas on March 11, 1929.

== Electoral history ==
1910 Oklahoma Commissioner of Insurance Democratic primary (August 2, 1910)
Party	Candidate	Votes	%
Democratic	P. A. Ballard	25,755	25.4%
Democratic	James W. Martin	23,214	22.9%
Democratic	Milas Lasater	18,840	18.6%
Democratic	Seth K. Corden	13,429	13.2%
Democratic	J. L. Calvert	11,759	11.6%
Democratic	William H. Ebey	8,233	8.1%
Turnout		101,230	
