= A. P. Watson =

American farmer, politician, and Confederate officer

Andrew P. Watson
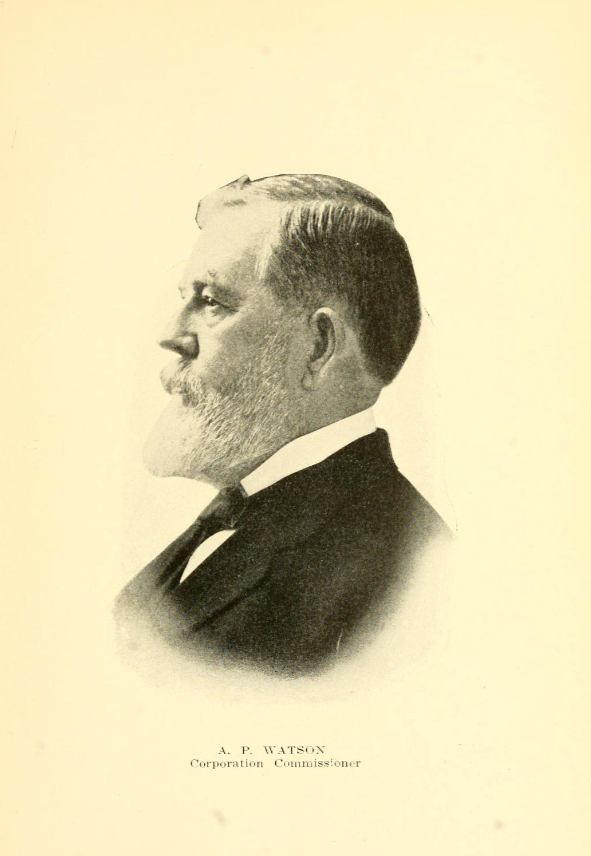
- A photo of Watson from a 1912 book

Oklahoma Pension Commissioner
- In office January 14, 1931 – November 26, 1932
- Governor: William H. Murray
- Preceded by: C.J. Stewart
- Succeeded by: J.E. Stinson

Justice of the Peace for Tulsa, Oklahoma
- In office 1924–1930

Oklahoma Corporation Commissioner
- In office November 16, 1907 – April 23, 1915
- Governor: Charles N. Haskell; Lee Cruce; Robert L. Williams
- Preceded by: Position established
- Succeeded by: Walter Davis Humphrey

Personal details
- Born: June 11, 1848 Acworth, Georgia
- Died: October 24, 1936 (aged 88) Ardmore, Oklahoma
- Party: Democratic Party

Military service
- Allegiance: Confederate States of America
- Branch/service: Confederate States Army
- Rank: Colonel
- Battles/wars: American Civil War

Andrew P. Watson was an American farmer, politician, and confederate officer who served as one of the first Oklahoma Corporation Commissioners from 1907 to 1915. He was frequently referred to as the "Potato King of Oklahoma" and was a member of the Democratic Party.

After being impeached in 1915, he was later elected a Justice of the Peace in Tulsa in the 1920s and was appointed as the Oklahoma Pension Commissioner by William H. Murray on January 14, 1931, serving until November 26, 1932.

== Early life and career ==
Andrew P. Watson was born in Acworth, Georgia on June 11, 1848, to James M. Watson and Nancy S. Mayes. Watson joined the Confederate States Army as a teenager and was one of the youngest commissioned officers, commanding a Georgian regiment at sixteen. His regiment fought in the American Civil War in South Carolina. By the end of war he was a colonel. At 19, he moved with his family to Mississippi. He moved to Shawnee in Indian Territory in 1901.

By 1902 he owned a 75-acre potato farm northwest of Shawnee. In 1902, he was elected vice-president of the Oklahoma and Indian Territories Agricultural Horticulture and Irrigation Society. In 1905, he served as the group's secretary. He was sometimes referred to by the press as the "Potato King of Oklahoma." (Note: The Oklahoma State Capital,*The Evening News, and Shawnee News-Herald) In 1904, he was the general of the territorial United Confederate Veterans association. He was also a member of the Woodsmen of the World.

== Political career ==
He ran in the Democratic primary to be Justice of the Peace for Shawnee, Oklahoma in 1904. In 1907, he was one of the Democratic Party's nominees for the Oklahoma Corporation Commission, defeating D.A. Crafton and Roy Hays in the September general election. He was described as a Jacksonian Democrat during his first election campaign.

=== Impeachment ===
In February 1915, the Oklahoma House of Representatives opened an investigation into the corporation commission. After investigating the commission, the house impeached Watson. Washington E. Hudson served as one of his prosecutors during his impeachment trial. In April, the Oklahoma Senate found him guilty of two of nine articles of impeachment related to a loan made to his wife by R.K. Wooten which he had endorsed. He was the third Oklahoma politician to be impeached and the second to be removed from office. (Note: Giles W. Farris, the Oklahoma State Printer, was the first to be impeached and removed from office in 1913; P. A. Ballard, Oklahoma Insurance Commissioner, was impeached, but resigned before the Oklahoma Senate could vote on their removal. Watson was officially removed from office on April 23, 1915.) Walter Davis Humphrey was appointed by Governor Robert L. Williams to replace him on the commission.

He immediately launched a re-election campaign for the office. In August 1916, he placed fifth and last in the Democratic primary.

=== Return to politics after impeachment ===
In March 1921, state senator Bob Wallace attempted to reopen the senate impeachment inquiry into Watson in order to 'reverse' his impeachment. The Oklahoma News described the actions as an attempt to "whitewash" the conviction. Watson served two terms as the Justice of the Peace for Tulsa, Oklahoma between from 1924 to 1930. He briefly resigned in 1928 due to illness, but won re-election. On January 14, 1931, Governor William H. Murray appointed Watson as the Oklahoma Commissioner of Pensions to succeed C.J. Stewart. He resigned on November 26, 1932. He was succeeded by J.E. Stinson on December 1, 1932.

Watson died in the veterans hospital in Ardmore, Oklahoma on October 24, 1936.

== Electoral history ==
1907 Oklahoma Corporation Commission elections
Party	Candidate	Votes	%	±%
Democratic	A.P. Watson	132,123	54.9	New
Republican	D.A. Crafton	99,109	41.1	New
Socialist	Roy Hays	9,423	3.9	New
Democratic gain from		Swing	N/A	

1908 Oklahoma Corporation Commission Democratic primary (August 4, 1908)
Party	Candidate	Votes	%
Democratic	A.P. Watson (Incumbent)	29,978	62.0%
Democratic	Thomas P. Smith	18,306	37.9%
Turnout		19,658	

1908 Oklahoma Corporation Commission election
Party	Candidate	Votes	%	±%
Democratic	A.P. Watson	121,285	48.4%	−6.5%
Republican	William H. Reynolds	108,105	43.2%	+2.1%
Socialist	Roy O'Bryan	21,128	8.4%	+4.5%
Democratic hold		Swing	N/A	

== Works cited ==
- Thoburn, Joseph Bradfield (1916). A Standard History of Oklahoma, Volume III. Oklahoma City: American Historical Society. p. 949-1342.
