= R. C. Pruett =

American politician

Representative R.C. Pruett
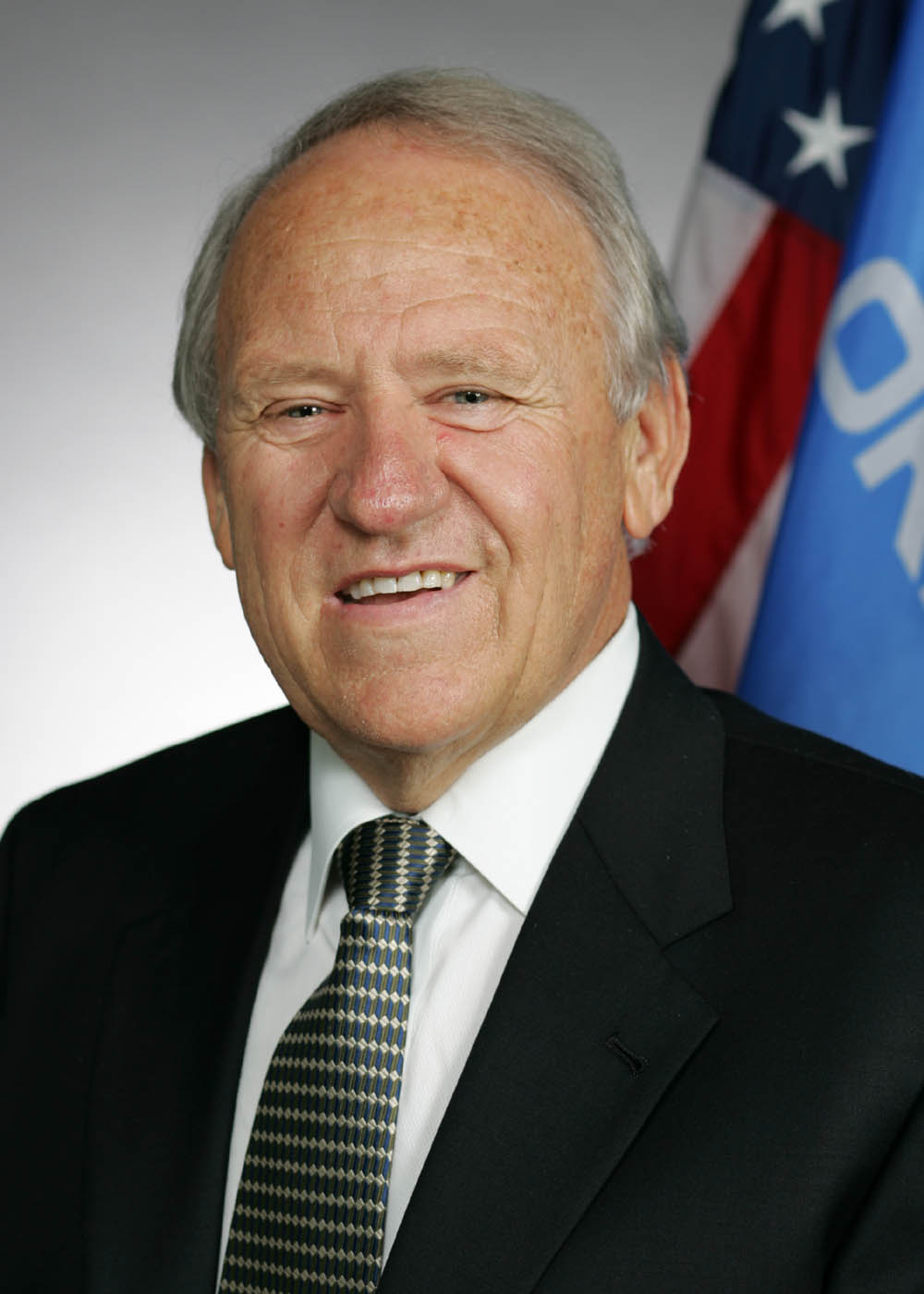

Member of the Oklahoma House of Representatives from the 19th district
- In office 2004–2016
- Preceded by: Randall Erwin
- Succeeded by: Justin Humphrey

Personal details
- Born: 19 September 1944 (age 81) Houston, Texas
- Party: Democratic
- Spouse: Barbara Pruett

R. C. Pruett (born September 19, 1944) is an American politician who served as State Representative for District 19 in the Oklahoma House of Representatives.

Pruett authored the legislation that created a license to shoot black bears in four southeastern Oklahoma counties. He is also the prior owner of three supermarkets in Antlers, Broken Bow, Oklahoma and Valliant, Oklahoma. His son, Ray Pruett, took his place in the company and now owns a chain of supermarkets.

== Early life and career ==
Pruett was born September 19, 1944, in Houston, Texas. He attended Texas A&M University. He is married to Barbara Pruett and has three children and three grandchildren.

== Political career ==
In 2004, he defeated Democrat John Williams in the primary, winning his party's nomination. He went on to win the general election. In 2006 and 2008 he was re-elected with no opposition. There was some speculation that he would enter the State Senate Race in 2008, but he announced that he would remain in the House.

Pruett was one of only two Democrats to serve on a special ethics committee appointed by Speaker Kris Steele in 2011.
