= T. J. McComb =

American politician

1st Oklahoma Insurance Commissioner
- In office November 16, 1907 – 1909
- Governor: Charles N. Haskell
- Preceded by: Position established
- Succeeded by: Milas Lasater

Personal details
- Party: Democratic Party

T.J. McComb was an American politician who served as the first Oklahoma Insurance Commissioner from 1907 to 1909.

== Biography ==
McComb was the first Oklahoma Insurance Commissioner from 1907 to 1909. He resigned before November 30, 1909, when Milas Lasater was appointed to replace him.

== Electoral history ==
1907 Oklahoma Commissioner of Insurance election
Party	Candidate	Votes	%	±%
Democratic	T. J. McComb	132,405	54.7	New
Republican	Michael Burke	99,697	41.2	New
Socialist	Thomas G. Toler	9,571	3.9	New
Democratic gain from		Swing	N/A	

Party political offices
First	Democratic nominee for Insurance Commissioner of Oklahoma; 1907	Succeeded by P. A. Ballard
