= Impeachment in Oklahoma =

The constitution of the U.S. state of Oklahoma grants its legislature the ability to impeach the state's elective state officers. An impeachment vote in the Oklahoma House is followed by an impeachment trial in the Oklahoma Senate, through which an official will be removed from office if convicted.

In its early statehood, Oklahoma saw many impeachment votes and impeachment inquiries. However, more recent decades have seen impeachments become infrequent.

== Impeachment law ==
Impeachment is a mechanism for removing a government official from office. In Oklahoma, impeachment of state officials is governed by the Oklahoma Constitution and covers statewide elected officials. Officials that may be impeached are the governor and "other elective state officers" (including the justices of the Supreme Court and judges of the Court of Criminal Appeals. The state constitution names the possible grounds for impeachment as "willful neglect of duty, corruption in office, habitual drunkenness, incompetency, or any offense involving moral turpitude while in office".

Impeachment procedures in Oklahoma are similar both to federal impeachment and impeachment in most other states. Impeachment takes place in the lower chamber of its legislature, the House, and requires a simple majority vote. The articles of impeachment are then tried in an impeachment trial held in its upper chamber, the Senate, and a "guilty" verdict requires a two-thirds majority.

With the exception of impeachments trials of Supreme Court justices, all impeachment trials are to be presided over by the chief justice of the Supreme Court. In the absence or disqualification of a chief justice, an associate justice of the Supreme Court instead will be selected by the Senate to preside over the impeachment trial. For impeachment trials of Supreme Court justices, however, the Senate chooses one of its own members to preside.

== Other Oklahoma laws on removal from office ==
Mechanisms for removing non-impeachable state officials from office is governed by statute. There is no mechanism for the removal of state officials by recall election.

Recall elections also occur in some local governments, including municipal governments. These are triggered by petition. For example, on April 2, 2024, Judd Blevins was recalled from the Enid City Commission after admitting to marching at the Unite the Right Rally in 2017 and amidst allegations he served as the Oklahoma state coordinator for the now-defunct Identity Evropa.

Tribal nations in Oklahoma have their own constitutions, and may have their own mechanisms for impeaching their tribal officials. This occurs separate from state law.

== Impeachments ==
In its early history, Oklahoma saw a significant amount of impeachment activity, with thirteen individuals being impeached in Oklahoma's first twenty-six years of statehood. At the time, the Democratic Party dominated state politics, but was inwardly divided among several factions and legislative blocs.

=== Giles W. Farris (state printer) in 1913 –removed ===
Giles W. Farris (state printer) was impeached. He was removed from office on February 26, 1913, after the state's first impeachment trial.

=== P. A. Ballard (insurance commissioner) in 1913 –resigned ===
P. A. Ballard (Insurance Commissioner), resigned on April 29, 1913, after his impeachment by the Oklahoma House of Representatives

=== A.P Watson (corporation commissioner) in 1915 –removed ===
A. P. Watson (corporation commissioner) was the second official to be impeached in the state's history. He was removed from office on April 23, 1915.

=== John C. Walton (governor) in 1923 –removed ===
While three out of the first four governors of Oklahoma faced impeachment inquiries (with Robert L. Williams being the sole exception), it was not until the fifth governor that one was actually impeached. Governor Jack C. Walton (a Democrat) was impeached and was removed from office in November 1923.

Walton had been elected governor in 1922 as the Democratic Party nominee. He had won the party's primary election with the support of the Farmer-Labor Reconstruction League, beating-out the Ku Klux Klan-supported candidate Thomas Horner Owen for the party's nomination. Walton then won the general election, handily defeating Republican nominee John Fields as part of the Democratic sweep of the state's 1922 elections. Despite this victory, Walton entered office with disapproval among several political factions –including some factions represented within his own party. This included his campaign rivals, klan-affiliated individuals and the so-called "school bloc". It would be the klan that would bring about the circumstances which led to his impeachment and removal, as his impeachment was spurred by the drastic actions he took in his efforts to crack-down on klan violence.

In August 1923, the klan mutilated a man in Tulsa who had been accused of drug peddling. To combat the klan violence in Tulsa, Governor Walton declared martial law in the city on August 13, and soon expanded this to the entirety of Okmulgee County. On September 1, he extended martial law to the entirety of the state. He deployed the National Guard to enforce martial law.

The legislature attempted to convene in an emergency session in reaction, with an effort to convene for the sake of impeaching the governor being spearheaded by Representative William McBee. Walton recognized that, at the time, a majority of members of the state legislature were members of the Klan and would therefore support his impeachment. Deeming the legislators to be klansmen, the governor asserted that a meeting by them would be deemed an unlawful klan assembly. The governor used armed forces to prevent an attempted meeting of the legislature on September 16. Walton had already set October 2 to include a special election on referendums for anti-klan reforms he was seeking. Campbell Russell circulated petitions to hold a simultaneous ballot initiative vote (Petition No. 79) that would amend the state constitution in the same election to permit the legislature to convene itself at any time if a majority of its members signed a petition to convene. Over the governor's objections, this was added to the ballots and was overwhelmingly passed by the state voters, thus enabling the legislature to again convene. On October 5, the legislature's leaders announced that it would convene twelve days later using this new power. However, hoping to limit attendance at their next meeting, the next day Governor Walton used his own power to call the legislature to convene in a special session even earlier on October 11, assigning the session the purpose of investigating the Klan. To pre-empt his pending removal, he also offered to resign, citing the adoption of his anti-klan statute as part of the October 2 as satisfactory accomplishments upon which he would be willing to step down after. The legislature declined to accept this offer. A legislative committee recommended twenty-two charges of impeachment. The charges adopted by the House by overwhelming vote margins, with twenty of them receiving support from three quarters of the state representatives.

The twenty-two articles of impeachment centered on an array of issues, including his declaring martial law in Okmulgee County to combat Ku Klux Klan violence (deploying the Oklahoma National Guard), censoring the Tulsa Tribune after it printed an advertisement by the Klan urging people to resist the martial law order, and for refusing to enforce the death penalty. Klan-aligned elements in the state legislature succeeded at removing Walton.

The House adopted the articles of impeachment on October 23 and informed the Senate that the governor had been impeached. The senate immediately suspended Walton pending the outcome of his impeachment trial. Thirty-one rules of procedure were adopted for the trial. The trial began on November 1, and ended twenty days later. In the trial, only the prosecution called witnesses. This was due to Walton withdrawing from participation in the trial before presenting his defense. On November 17, Walton had announced to the senate that he would no longer participate in the trial following an adverse ruling on the admission of evidence, remarking

Mr. Chief Justice, and members of this Court, I have been sitting here fighting for my honor, for my rights, and for my home for ten days. I don't wish here to criticize any of these honorable members; some of them no doubt want me to have a fair trial; but I have reached the conclusion that I cannot have a fair trial in this Court. Knowing that, I am withdrawing from this room. I don't care to stand this humiliation any longer for myself, my family, or my honorable attorneys. You may proceed as you see best.

Walton's attorneys seemed to misunderstand the impeachment as a legal preceding rather than a civil/legislative proceeding. Believing that they could appeal an unfavorable outcome, the lawyers sought to secure possible grounds to file a legal appeal against the impeachment by voicing 170 exceptions to overruled objections and requesting that a bill of these exceptions be prepared for them.

At the close of the trial, the Senate first voted on Article XIX (charging abuse of the pardon power). The 41 senators present unanimously voted to hold Walton as guilty. Thereafter, the impeachment managers presented fifteen further articles, ten of which received the two-thirds support necessary for Walton to be held guilty. After voting on sixteen articles, the managers motioned to drop consideration the remaining articles. Some debate was held as to whether the managers had authority to make this motion, but the motion was ultimately adopted by the Senate. Walton's attorneys made a motion for the governor to be given a new trial, which the Senate denied. The Senate then adopted a motion which denied any appeal to be made from its verdict. As a result of Walton being found guilty in his impeachment trial, he was removed from his office and Lieutenant Governor Martin Edwin Trapp became governor.

=== 1927 impeachments of Henry S. Johnston (governor), Harry Cordell (com. of agriculture) and Fred P. Branson (chief justice of the Supreme Court) –voided ===
On December 12, 1927, the House of Representatives met in special session voted to impeach Henry S. Johnston (governor), Fred P. Branson (chief justice of the Supreme Court), and Harry Cordell (commissioner of agriculture). The validity of the Johnston and Cordell impeachment votes were challenged in courts. On December 29, the Senate deemed the articles of impeachment against the three men to be void.

The validity of the impeachments was challenged due to prior court rulings against the Senate being able to call itself into special session. The House desired to meet in special session to investigate the governor and his administration, with consideration of possible impeachment. Governor Johnston refused to call a special session. The House therefore decided to call itself into special session. As the House began preparing to impeach Johnston, Justice Branson authored a Supreme Court ruling that Measure 79 (the statute adopted by voters in 1923 to allow the legislature to call itself into session) had not been ratified because neither the legislature nor governor had approved its referral to voters. The ruling therefore held that the state constitution did not grant the legislature the power to call itself into session. This meant that any impeachment adopted during the self-called special session was to be considered unconstitutional since the governor had not called for the special session. The House disregarded this and proceeded with its plans. In advance of a House vote, the governor secured a temporary district court injunction against the effort to impeach him in special session. Nevertheless, the House of Representatives proceeded with the effort.

=== Henry S. Johnston (governor) in 1929 –removed ===
Johnston was again impeached in 1929, being convicted and removed from office on March 21, 1929 for "general incompetence."

After 1927, the state legislature would ultimately not be able to convene again until the start of its next term in January 1929. The thirteen months only hardened their resolve to oppose Governor Johnston and his administration.

The Senate voted to call for Mrs. Hammonds to resign. Hammonds and Johnston rebuked this call, with Johnston lambasting what he described as Hammonds being treated as an "ewe lamb about to be delivered into the caping mouths of political wolves." This phrase led to the January 1929 steps towards impeachment to be dubbed the "Ewe Lamb Rebellion". The House quickly authored ten articles of impeachment against Johnson, and passed five of them (with the expectation of passing the remainder later). The next the Senate voted 38–5 to suspend Johnston from office pending an impeachment trial, with Lieutenant Governor William J. Holloway becoming acting governor. One senator had introduced a competing motion for the senate to refuse to receive nor file the impeachment, but this was rejected. Six more articles of impeachment were later adopted in addition to the initial five adopted articles.

The articles of impeachment against Johnston related to:

- Unlawful issuance of state banking department deficiency certificates. Six of the articles of impeachment dealt with this,
- Unwarranted and illegal authorization of the National Guard to interfere with the attempted convening of the legislature in late 1927. Three articles dealt with this.
- Illegal appointments of officials (the subject of two articles)
- Corrupt use of pardon powers, including a pardon of convicted murderer Dewey Crosthwaite (the pardon being an official act which Johnston had already called the "greatest mistake of my life")
- General incompetency

Johnston's impeachment trial was held from February 11 to March 20. The trial was presided over by Chief Justice Charles W. Mason. It utilized all but one of the thirty-one rules that had been previously used for Governor Walton's impeachment trial. The record of its proceedings contained more than five thousand pages. Impeachment managers focused their attention on arguing the incompetency charge, arguing that the governor was overly-controlled by Mrs. Hammonds. No effort was made the managers to argue that the governor was corrupt or severely lacking in morals. At the conclusion of the trial, the first article of impeachment voted on was the charge of incompetence, which received a 39–9 vote that well exceeded the margin needed to remove the governor from office. The remaining articles were voted on afterwards (by then a pro-forma action, as the governor was already removed by the Senate's first vote), and none of these other articles received the margin that would have been required for removal if the governor's removal had instead hinged on those articles. In a 1930 journal article, Cortez A. M. Ewing observed of the only article to pass being that of incompetence,

The outcome was indeed curious. Johnston was adjudged incompetent, yet no specific act was deemed sufficiently flagrant to merit conviction.

=== 1929 impeachments of three Supreme Court justices –acquitted/not removed ===
The day after Governor Johnson's impeachment trial ended, the House investigating committee adopted the recommendation of a total of thirty-two articles of impeachment to be brought against three Supreme Court justices: Chief Justice Charles W. Mason and Associated Justices Fletcher Riley and James Waddey Clark. None of the three were removed. Mason and Clark were acquitted in their impeachment trials, while the articles of impeachment against Riley were dismissed during his trial.

Chief Justice Charles W. Mason was impeached on March 23, 1929 over allegations of bribery. The House further impeached Justice James Waddey Clark, passing eleven articles of impeachment alleging corruption.

The House also impeached Fletcher. The Senate began to hold trials on March 28.

On May 11, Clark's trial concluded with him being acquitted. He thereafter served out the remainder of his term.

=== Napoleon Bonaparte Johnson (Supreme Court justice) in 1965 –removed ===
Napoleon Bonaparte Johnson (Supreme Court justice), impeached and removed from office amid the 1965 Oklahoma Supreme Court scandal.

=== Carroll Fisher (insurance commissioner), 2004 –resigned ===
Carroll Fisher (insurance commissioner), resigned on September 24, 2004, after his impeachment by the Oklahoma House of Representatives

== Other impeachment efforts ==
In Oklahoma's early state history, impeachment inquiries against governors by the Oklahoma House of Representatives were commonplace.

=== James B. A. Robertson (governor) in 1920 ===
Due to political scandals surrounding his administration of funds the state received from the federal government, Governor James B. A. Robertson faced an impeachment effort resulting in an impeachment resolution falling only one vote shy of adoption. The House abandoned the effort after it deadlocked in a tie-vote.

=== A. L. Crable (superintendent of public instruction), 1944–45 ===
In early 1944, the state House rejected a resolution urging Crable's impeachment by a vote of 48–50.

Ahead of the 1940 general election, House Speaker Jed Johnson made a campaign promise that he'd resign from his office if Crable was not impeached within 30 days of the next legislature. In early 1945, a House investigating committee recommended impeaching Crable.) After three days of heated debate,) the full House voted on February 16 to reject six articles of impeachment (which all related to the adoption of textbooks into state curriculum.) The proposed article of impeachment that got the closest to passing (concerning the acquisition and distribution of textbooks to poor households by the state welfare board) was rejected 55–59. Governor Robert S. Kerr had worked behind-the-scenes to lobby against the impeachment. House Speaker Johnson and other House leaders supported the impeachment effort. 21 House Republicans backed the impeachment.

The first proposed article (alleging that Crable had at meetings moved and seconded the adoption of textbooks that he had been warned were in violation state laws) received a vote a 48–60. The third proposed article impeachment (alleging that he had failed to certify 1940 textbook adoptions as he was required by law to) received a vote of 45–69. The fifth proposed article of impeachment (alleging that he had falsely denied that his own signature was present on documents when previously questioned by legislative committees) received a vote of 51–63. The sixth proposed article of impeachment (alleging that a member of the textbook commission had violated law) received a vote of 46–68.

=== David Walters (governor) in 1994 ===
Governor David Walters faced calls for an impeachment effort against him after a grand jury approved an indictment a made an additional recommendation that Walters be impeached by the House. The indictment was for eight felony counts and an additional misdemeanor, with the misdemeanor accusing him violating campaign finance law by urging a campaign contributor to give his 1994 gubernatorial election campaign committee $19,500, and amount that was $13,500 above the contribution limit of $5,000. The six felonies were for perjury due to Walter's signing of campaign finance reports. Walters plead guilty to the misdemeanor and received a deferred sentence of one year, a $1,000 fine, and was ordered to pay the excess campaign funds he illegally received to the state government Ethics Commission. He also announced in November 1993 that he would not be running in the 1994 election. In 1994, the House voted 52–47 against holding an impeachment inquiry.

== Other impeachment efforts ==
=== Proceedings and resignation of Leo Meyer (state auditor) in 1913 ===
Leo Meyer (Auditor), resigned February 12, 1913, after the Oklahoma House of Representatives began impeachment proceedings

=== Resignation of Samuel Earl Welch (Supreme Court justice) amid threat of impeachment inquiry in 1965 ===
Amid the 1965 Oklahoma Supreme Court scandal, Justice Samuel Earl Welch resigned in the face of the near-certainty that the House would launch an impeachment inquiry.

== Impeachment by local and tribal governments in Oklahoma ==
=== Municipal impeachments ===
In 1916, Frank M. Wooden, the mayor of Tulsa, was impeached and removed from office.

=== Impeachments by tribal nations within Oklahoma boundaries ===
Many tribal governments (which have their own constitutions and laws and are recognized by the federal government as domestic dependent nations) have impeachment processes for their leadership. Examples of tribal governments that have an impeachment process include the Pine Ridge Indian Reservation There are 36 federally-recognized tribes in Oklahoma.

One example of a tribal impeachment in Oklahoma occurred in 2014, when John Red Eagle (Osage Nation Principal Chief) was impeached and removed from office.

== See also ==
- Impeachment by state and territorial governments of the United States
- Impeachment in the United States
