= A. L. Welch =

American politician

4th Oklahoma Insurance Commissioner
- In office April 29, 1913 – January 1, 1920
- Appointed by: Lee Cruce (Note: Appointed after Ballard resigned. Elected to a full term in 1914.)
- Governor: Lee Cruce; Robert L. Williams; James B. A. Robertson
- Preceded by: P. A. Ballard
- Succeeded by: E. W. Hardin

Personal details
- Party: Democratic Party

A. L. Welch was an American politician who served as the 4th Oklahoma Insurance Commissioner from 1913 to 1920. He was a member of the Democratic Party. He was impeached by the Oklahoma House of Representatives in 1915, but acquitted in the Oklahoma Senate.
