= P. A. Ballard =

American politician

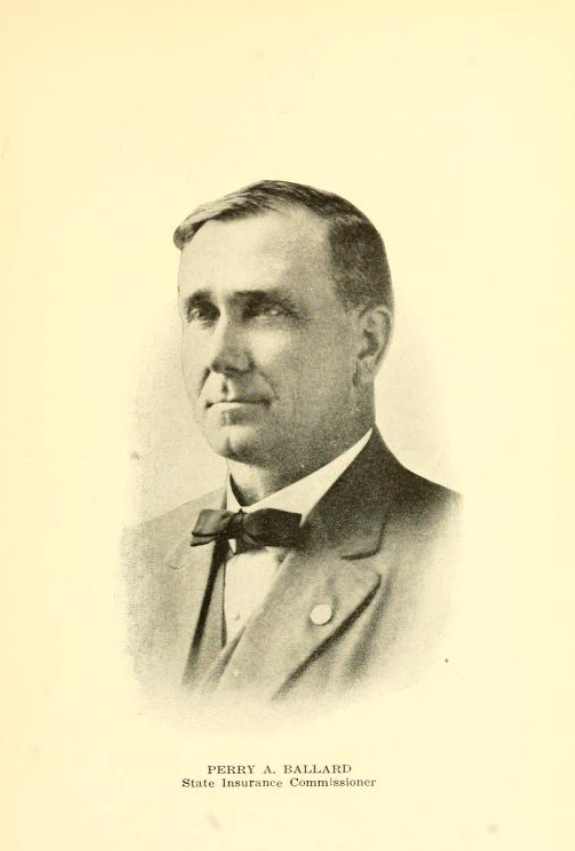

3rd Oklahoma Insurance Commissioner
- In office January 1911 – April 29, 1913
- Governor: Lee Cruce
- Preceded by: Milas Lasater
- Succeeded by: A. L. Welch

Member of the Oklahoma House of Representatives
- In office November 16, 1907 – November 16, 1908
- Preceded by: Position established
- Succeeded by: C. E. Sexton
- Constituency: Payne County

Personal details
- Born: 1863 Kentucky, US
- Died: Unknown
- Political party: Democratic Party

Perry A. Ballard was an American politician who served as the 3rd Oklahoma Insurance Commissioner between 1911 and 1913.

== Biography ==
P. A. Ballard was born in 1863 in Kentucky. He attended the Taylor Institute in Platt City, Missouri, Ellis Academy in Pittsburg, Missouri, and Christian Brothers College High School in St. Louis. He was an oil inspector during the tenure of Governor Alexander M. Dockery in Missouri. He moved to Oklahoma in 1903 and was elected to the inaugural Oklahoma House of Representatives in 1907. He defeated incumbent Milas Lasater in the 1910 Democratic primary and later won the general election. He resigned on April 29, 1913, after being impeached by the Oklahoma House of Representatives, but before his trial in the Oklahoma Senate. He was replaced by A. L. Welch.

== Electoral history ==
1910 Oklahoma Commissioner of Insurance Democratic primary (August 2, 1910)
Party	Candidate	Votes	%
Democratic	P. A. Ballard	25,755	25.4%
Democratic	James W. Martin	23,214	22.9%
Democratic	Milas Lasater (incumbent)	18,840	18.6%
Democratic	Seth K. Corden	13,429	13.2%
Democratic	J. L. Calvert	11,759	11.6%
Democratic	William H. Ebey	8,233	8.1%
Turnout		101,230	

1910 Oklahoma Commissioner of Insurance election
Party	Candidate	Votes	%	±%
Democratic	P. A. Ballard	116,621	49.8%	−5.1%
Republican	James T. Burns	93,778	40.0%	−1.2%
Socialist	E. S. Maple	23,761	10.1%	+6.2%
Democratic hold		Swing		

Party political offices
Preceded by T. J. McComb	Democratic nominee for Insurance Commissioner of Oklahoma; 1910	Succeeded by A. L. Welch
