= Glen Mulready =

American politician

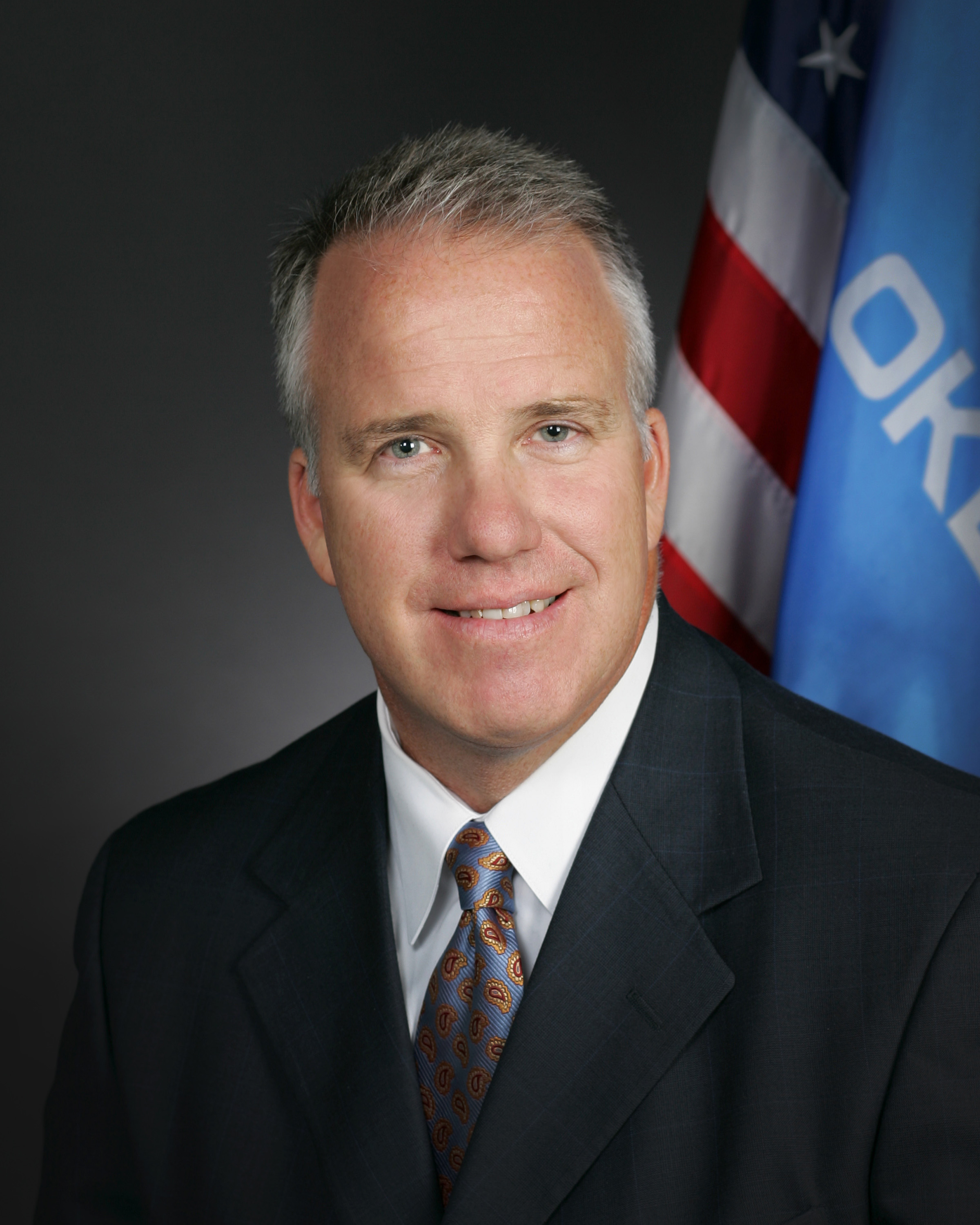

13th Insurance Commissioner of Oklahoma
- Incumbent
- Assumed office January 14, 2019
- Governor: Kevin Stitt
- Preceded by: John D. Doak

Member of the Oklahoma House of Representatives from the 68th district
- In office November 16, 2010 – November 15, 2018
- Preceded by: Chris Benge
- Succeeded by: Lonnie Sims

Personal details
- Born: November 21, 1960 (age 65)
- Party: Republican
- Education: Bridgewater State University (attended)

Glen Mulready (born November 21, 1960) is an American politician who has served as the Oklahoma Insurance Commissioner since 2019. He was first elected in 2018. He previously served in the Oklahoma House of Representatives from the 68th district from 2010 to 2018.

== Career ==
Glen Mulready was first elected to the Oklahoma House of Representatives in 2010. In 2018, he retired to run for Insurance Commissioner.

Mulready defeated Donald Chasteen, a Tulsa insurance agent and firefighter, for the Republican nomination for Insurance Commissioner in the June 2018 primary. He faced Democratic candidate Kimberly Fobbs in the general election. He would later go on to win the general election 2018.

Mulready was re-elected as Oklahoma Insurance Commissioner in 2022 without opposition.

Party political offices
Preceded by John D. Doak	Republican nominee for Insurance Commissioner of Oklahoma; 2018, 2022	Most recent
Political offices
Preceded by John D. Doak	Insurance Commissioner of Oklahoma; 2019–present	Incumbent
