= Ethical persuasion =

Morality of persuasion

Ethical persuasion concerns the moral principles associated with a speaker's use of persuasion to influence an audience's beliefs, attitudes, intentions, motivations, or behaviors. An ethical speaker may endeavor to:

1. Explore the audience's viewpoint,
2. Explain the speaker's viewpoint, and
3. Create resolutions.

The ethics of persuasion in professional media fields such as journalism have received some academic attention. Baker and Martinson present a five-part test which defines the five principles of truthfulness, authenticity, respect, equity, and social responsibility (i.e., the importance of the common good). Thus, the TARES test serves as a metric of a speaker's adherence to some ethical principles in professional persuasive correspondence. Fitzpatrick and Gauthier ask several questions of their own to evaluate the ethics of persuasion:

1. For what purpose is persuasion being employed?
2. Toward what choices and with what consequences for individuals is persuasion being used?
3. Does the persuasion contribute to or interfere with the audience's decision-making processes?

Relatedly, the ethics of rhetoric is concerned with a person's ability to resist the temptation of helping themselves by harming others. Another instance of unethical persuasion would be to use persuasion for personal gain without the knowledge of the audience.
