= Henry S. Johnston =

American politician

Henry Johnston

7th Governor of Oklahoma
- In office January 10, 1927 – March 20, 1929
- Lieutenant: William J. Holloway
- Preceded by: Martin E. Trapp
- Succeeded by: William J. Holloway

1st President pro tempore of the Oklahoma Senate
- In office 1907–1909
- Preceded by: Position established
- Succeeded by: J. C. Graham

Member of the Oklahoma Senate from the 10th district
- In office November 16, 1907 – November 16, 1908
- Preceded by: Position established
- Succeeded by: J. Q. Newell
- In office November 16, 1932 – November 16, 1936
- Preceded by: Jo Ferguson
- Succeeded by: John T. Sanford

Member of the Oklahoma Territorial Council from the 2nd district
- In office 1897–1899
- Preceded by: John S. Allan
- Succeeded by: A. J. Biddison

Personal details
- Born: Henry Simpson Johnston; December 30, 1867 Evansville, Indiana, U.S.
- Died: January 7, 1965 (aged 97) Perry, Oklahoma, U.S.
- Party: Democratic
- Spouse: Ethel Littleton
- Education: Baker University; Southwestern College

Henry Simpson Johnston (December 30, 1867 – January 7, 1965) was an American lawyer and politician who served as a delegate to the Oklahoma Constitutional Convention, the first president pro tempore of the Oklahoma Senate, and the seventh governor of Oklahoma. He would become the second governor in Oklahoma history to be impeached and removed from office.

As governor, Johnston successfully proposed the establishment of a crippled children's hospital and a large increase to school aid funds. His trouble began with complaints about his private secretary holding too much power and making executive decisions that he should be making. After an unsuccessful and unconstitutional special session to impeach the governor in 1927, a new group of state lawmakers impeached the governor in 1929.

Johnston died in 1965 and is buried in Perry, Oklahoma.

== Early life ==
Born in a log cabin on December 30, 1867, Johnston was a native of Evansville, Indiana. At age 24, Johnston would move to Colorado where he studied law and passed the bar exam in 1891. After a few years in Colorado, Johnston would move to Perry in Oklahoma Territory where he would become a powerful and popular figure throughout the area of Noble County.

Upon announcement that Oklahoma and Indian Territories were to combine into one state, Johnston was elected in 1906 to represent Noble and the surrounding counties at the Oklahoma Constitutional Convention. During the convention, Johnston would be elected to serve in the body's number-two office as the President Pro Tempore of the Convention. Johnston met future governors Charles N. Haskell, William H. Murray and Robert L. Williams. These men would work together to write one of the most progressive Constitutions of any U.S. state, as well as the longest governing document in the world at the time.

On November 16, 1907, the United States Congress accepted the Oklahoma Constitution. On the same day, Charles N. Haskell was inaugurated as the state's first governor. Before the state constitution was approved, Johnston ran and was elected to the Oklahoma Senate to serve in the 1st Oklahoma Legislature. A popular figure, Johnston was selected to serve as the first President Pro Tempore of the Oklahoma Senate, the state senate's highest official behind the Lieutenant Governor of Oklahoma, who serves as President of the Oklahoma Senate.

Among Johnson's most powerful supporters were prohibitionists, Protestant churchmen, and Freemasons. Johnston himself would serve as the Grand Master of the Masonic Lodge of Oklahoma.

== 1926 gubernatorial election ==
In 1926, Johnson ran for governor of Oklahoma as a Democratic candidate to replace outgoing governor Martin E. Trapp. Trapp (who had taken office after the 1923 impeachment of Governor John C. Walton) was prohibited by state courts from running for a full term after it had been held that the state constitution's prohibition on election to multiple consecutive gubernatorial terms applied to him and the partial term he was serving as governor. During the campaign, Johnston was a member of and supported by the Ku Klux Klan. Johnston won the Democratic primary election by a narrow margin in a multi-candidate race, and went on to win the general election. Winning the general election, Johnston was inaugurated as the seventh governor of Oklahoma.

== Governorship ==
On January 10, 1927, Johnston was inaugurated as the seventh Governor of Oklahoma with all the hopes of a successful administration. Immediately, the Oklahoma Legislature approved Johnston's appropriation proposals to establish a crippled children's hospital and increased school aid funds to over $1,500,000 a year. As one observer cited, it was the "highest public school subsidy in state history at the time".

Johnson entered office with fierce opposition from several political camps. This included camps with representation in his own party, including those aligned with the losing gubernatorial contenders, the anti-Klan camp, and political adversaries of his personal secretary O. O. Hammonds. Disapproval of Mrs. Hammonds would ultimately prove a prime motivation behind later efforts to impeach Johnston. Before the state legislature adjourned in May 1927, complaints were raised against Johnston's private secretary, Mrs. O. O. Hammonds. The legislative leaders believed Hammonds held too much power over the governor. It was even believed that she went so far to make executive decisions and appointments in her own right. Believing that Johnston was neglecting his duties, the leaders of the state legislature's demanded that she be immediately discharged from the governor's services.

=== December 1927 impeachment effort ===
Determined to impeach Johnston for neglect of his duties by the end of 1927, the legislative leaders met in special session under a newly adopted initiative proposition. This measure was introduced to deal with Governor Jack C. Walton's impeachment four years earlier. In this special session, the state legislature announced its plans to investigate the governor. Before the Oklahoma Legislature could act, the Oklahoma Supreme Court intervened to the benefit of Johnston. The court ruled in the case Simpson v. Hill that the Legislature's actions were unconstitutional and that they could only meet during regular sessions or at the call of the governor in special session. Following the Supreme Court's example, Oklahoma City's district court issued an injunction against the Oklahoma Legislature, preventing state lawmakers from convening.

Ignoring both courts, the state legislature proceeded with its plans and headed for the Oklahoma State Capitol to continue with impeachment charges. The Oklahoma Legislature was only stopped when Oklahoma National Guard troops, under the orders of Johnston, prevented them from entering the Capitol. This did not stop the Legislature from acting. The Legislature convened on December 13, 1927, in the Huckins Hotel in downtown Oklahoma City. There, the Oklahoma House of Representatives raised charges, which the Oklahoma Senate as the Court of Impeachment agreed to, against Governor Johnston and many members of his administration. However, realizing that the judicial branch sided with the executive branch on this matter and that the courts were concerned over the legality of their session, the state senate dismissed the issues and the state legislature adjourned. The whole event only made Johnston more popular and powerful. The people loved him for using the courts to decide the issue, rather than martial law.

=== 1928 elections ===
Johnston returned to serve for several months without any harassment from the state legislature. However, everything changed toward the end of 1928. That year, the Democrats had selected Al Smith as their U.S. presidential nominee to challenge the Republican nominee, Herbert Hoover. Supporting his Democratic ally, Johnston campaigned in the state on Smith's behalf. Smith, a Catholic, supported the end of prohibition and he spoke out against "religious bigots". Hoover won the presidency in an overwhelming national landslide with 58% of the popular vote. In Oklahoma, Hoover did even better and trounced Smith with 63.7% of the vote and many Oklahoma Republicans won state offices on his coattails, including seats on the Oklahoma Supreme Court, a near majority in the Oklahoma House, and large gains in the Oklahoma Senate. Johnston was left alone as the only strong Democratic figure in the state.

=== 1929 impeachment and removal ===
When the state legislature met in regular session in 1929, both Democrats and Republicans crafted a second wave of impeachment charges. Of the thirteen articles of impeachment presented by the Oklahoma House of Representatives, the state senate accepted eleven. On January 21, Johnston was officially suspended from office and Lieutenant Governor of Oklahoma William J. Holloway became acting governor. Johnston's impeachment trial began on February 6 and would last over six weeks. The trial came to an end on March 20 with the State Senate removing Johnston from office on the eleventh charge: general incompetence. The ten other charges were dismissed. On the same day, Holloway became the eighth governor of Oklahoma. He was the second lieutenant governor to become governor through the gubernatorial succession process in state history, the first being Martin E. Trapp.

== Later life and legacy ==
Following impeachment, Johnston returned to practice law in Perry. Four years later, he would win a term in the state senate, serving from 1933 to 1937. After leaving the Senate, he would once again return to practice law in Perry, where he died at the age of 97 on January 7, 1965. He was the longest-lived governor in Oklahoma history, before or since. Johnston is buried in Perry.

The removal of Johnston proved to be the Oklahoma Legislature's apex of dominance against the other two branches of state government. Over the first two decades of Oklahoma's state existence, the state legislature had brought impeachment charges against four governors and had removed two. Only Governors Charles N. Haskell and Robert L. Williams would wield great executive power during this time.

Nationwide, it would be nearly 60 years before another U.S. governor was impeached—Governor Evan Mecham of Arizona in 1988.

== State of the State Speeches ==
- First State of the State Speech
- Second State of the State Speech

== Sources ==
- Governor Henry Johnston
- Oklahoma Supreme Court Case Simpson v. Hill

Oklahoma Senate
New office	President pro tempore of the Oklahoma Senate; 1907–1909	Succeeded by J. C. Graham
Party political offices
Preceded by Jack C. Walton	Democratic nominee for Governor of Oklahoma; 1926	Succeeded by William H. Murray
Political offices
Preceded by Martin E. Trapp	Governor of Oklahoma; 1927–1929	Succeeded by William J. Holloway
