= Carroll Fisher =

American politician

Oklahoma Insurance Commissioner
- In office January 1999 – September 24, 2004
- Preceded by: John P. Crawford
- Succeeded by: Kim Holland

Personal details
- Party: Democratic Party

Carroll Fisher is an American politician who served as the Oklahoma Insurance Commissioner between 1999 and September 2004.

He resigned on September 24, 2004, after he was impeached in by the Oklahoma House of Representatives, but before his trial in the Oklahoma Senate. He was impeached after being charged with felony embezzlement. Fisher was the first impeachment vote since 1975 when the Oklahoma House impeached Oklahoma Secretary of State John Rogers.
