= Oklahoma Insurance Commissioner =

Elected executive officer

The Oklahoma Insurance Commissioner is an elected executive officer of the state of Oklahoma. The Insurance Commissioner serves as the head of the Oklahoma Insurance Department. The Oklahoma Insurance Department is charged with executing all laws relating to insurance and insurance companies doing business in the State.

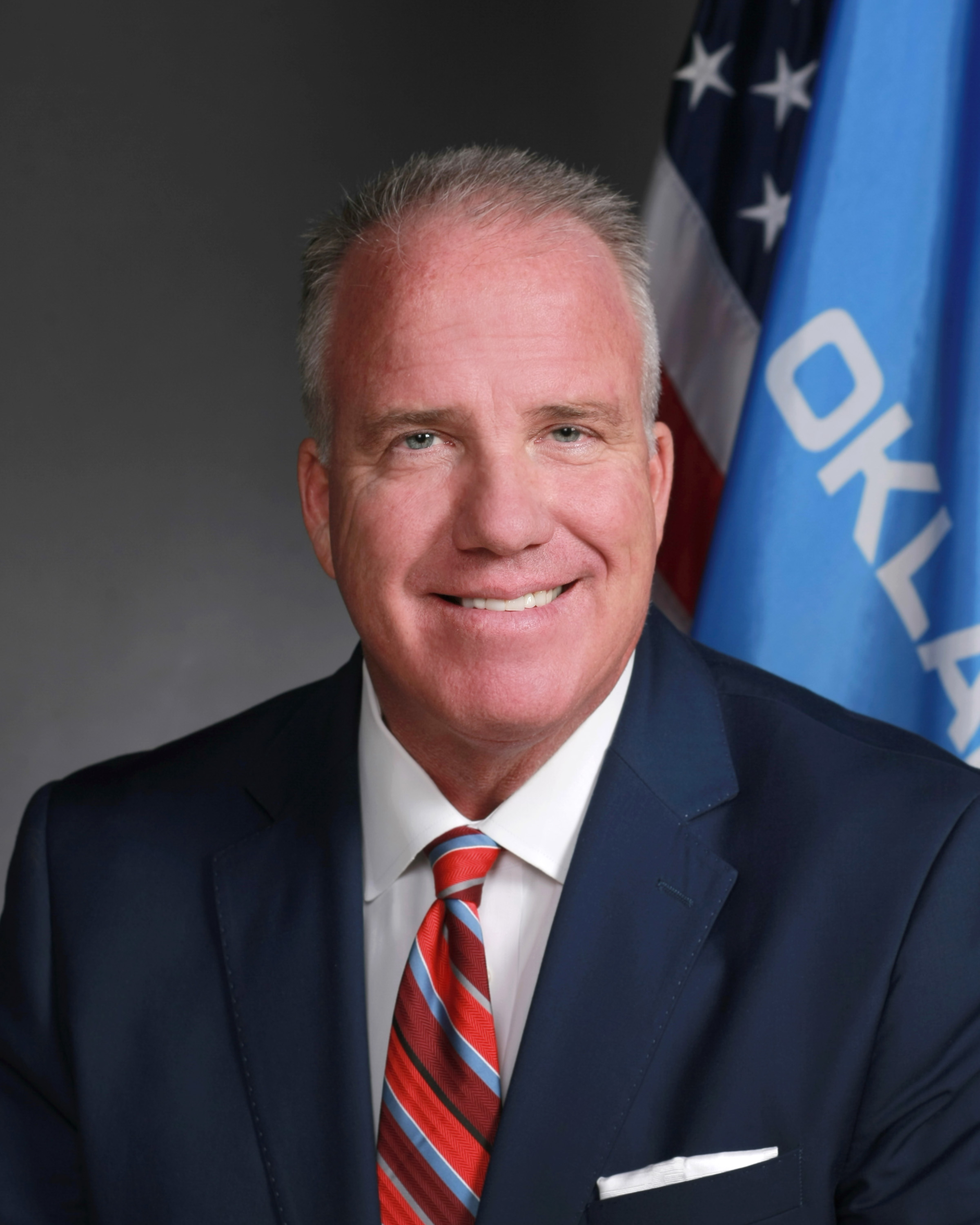
Oklahoma Insurance Commissioner Glen Mulready

The current Insurance Commissioner is Glen Mulready who was elected in November 2018 and took the oath of office on January 14, 2019.

== Qualifications ==
In order to serve as the Insurance Commissioner, a candidate must be at least twenty-five years old, a resident of the State for at least five years prior to their election, and have had at least five years' experience in the insurance industry in administration, sales, servicing or regulation. The Insurance Commissioner is forbidden from being financially interested, directly or indirectly, in any insurer, agency or insurance transaction except as a policyholder or claimant under a policy. The Insurance Commissioner serves a four-year term that runs concurrent with that of the Governor.

== Powers and responsibilities ==
As the chief executive officer of the Oklahoma Insurance Department, the Insurance Commissioner is responsible for enforcing the provisions of the Oklahoma Insurance Code. As such, the Insurance Commissioner may adopt reasonable rules and regulations for its implementation and administration.

The Insurance Commissioner has jurisdiction over complaints against all persons engaged in the business of insurance, and hears all matters either in person, by authorized disinterested employees, or by hearing examiners appointed by the Commissioner for that purpose. In performing his official duties, the Insurance Commissioner must make annual reports to Governor of Oklahoma on the activities of the Insurance Department. Such report must contain statements about each insurance company operating in the state, which must include their admitted assets, liabilities except capital, capital and surplus, Oklahoma premium income, amount of claims paid in Oklahoma, and such other matters as the Insurance Commissioner deems necessary to the benefit of the people of Oklahoma.

The Insurance Commissioner is allowed to educate consumers and make recommendations regarding the subject of insurance to state officials and private individuals.

=== Examinations ===
One of Insurance Commissioner's principal powers is the ability to examine any insurance company operating in the State, but the Insurance Commissioner must investigate every domestic insurance company at least once every three years and every foreign insurance company every five years. However, the Insurance Commissioner must accept examinations conducted by other states on foreign insurers located in such states.

Upon the request of one or more persons financially interested in a given insurance company, the Insurance Commissioner may make examinations of their request insurance company. The request must include the specifications of the reasons for examination resulting in that company being in unsound condition.

For purposes of completing an examination of any insurance company under its jurisdiction, the Insurance Commissioner may examine or investigate any person, or the business of any person, if such examination or investigation is, at the sole discretion of the Insurance Commissioner, necessary or material to the examination of the insurance company.

Upon determining that an examination should be conducted, the Insurance Commissioner may issue an examination warrant appointing one or more examiners to perform the examination and instructing them as to the scope of the examination. Every company or person from whom information is sought, including all of its officers, directors, employees and agents, must provide to the Insurance Commissioner and examiners timely, convenient, and free access to all books, records, accounts, papers, documents and recordings relating to the property, assets, business and affairs of the insurance company being examined. The officers, directors, employees and agents of the company or person must facilitate such examination and aid in such examination so far as it is in their power to do so. Any refusal of any insurance company, by its officers, directors, employees or agents, to submit to examination or to comply with any reasonable written request of the examiners shall be grounds for suspension or refusal of nonrenewal of any license or authority held by the insurance company, subject to the Commissioner's jurisdiction.

The Insurance Commissioner, or the examiners, have the power to issue subpoenas, to administer oaths and to examine under oath any person as to any matter pertinent to the examination. Upon the failure or refusal of any person to obey a subpoena, the Insurance Commissioner may petition a court of competent jurisdiction, and upon proper showing, the court may enter any order compelling the witness to appear and testify or produce documentary evidence. Failure to obey the court order shall be punishable as contempt of court.

At any time, the Insurance Commissioner may terminate or suspend any examination in order to pursue other legal or regulatory action pursuant to the Oklahoma Insurance Code. Findings of fact and conclusions made in any examination report shall be prima facie evidence in any legal or regulatory action.

== Office-Holders ==
The following is a complete list of those individuals who have served as Insurance Commissioner of Oklahoma:

Name	Party	Term
T. J. McComb	Democratic	1907–1909
Milas Lasater	Democratic	1909–1911
P. A. Ballard	Democratic	1911–1913
A. L. Welch	Democratic	1913–1920
E. W. Hardin	Democratic	1920–1927
Jess G. Reed	Democratic	1927–1947
Donald F. Dickey	Democratic	1947–1955
Joe B. Hunt	Democratic	1955–1975
Gerald Grimes	Democratic	1975–1991
Cathy Weatherford	Appointed	1991–1995
John P. Crawford	Republican	1995–1999
Carroll Fisher	Democratic	1999–2005
Kim Holland	Democratic	2005–2011
John D. Doak	Republican	2011–2019
Glen Mulready	Republican	2019–present

== See also ==
- Oklahoma Department of Insurance
- Governor of Oklahoma
- Insurance commissioner
