= Libertarian Party of Oklahoma =

State affiliate of the Libertarian Party

Oklahoma Libertarian Party
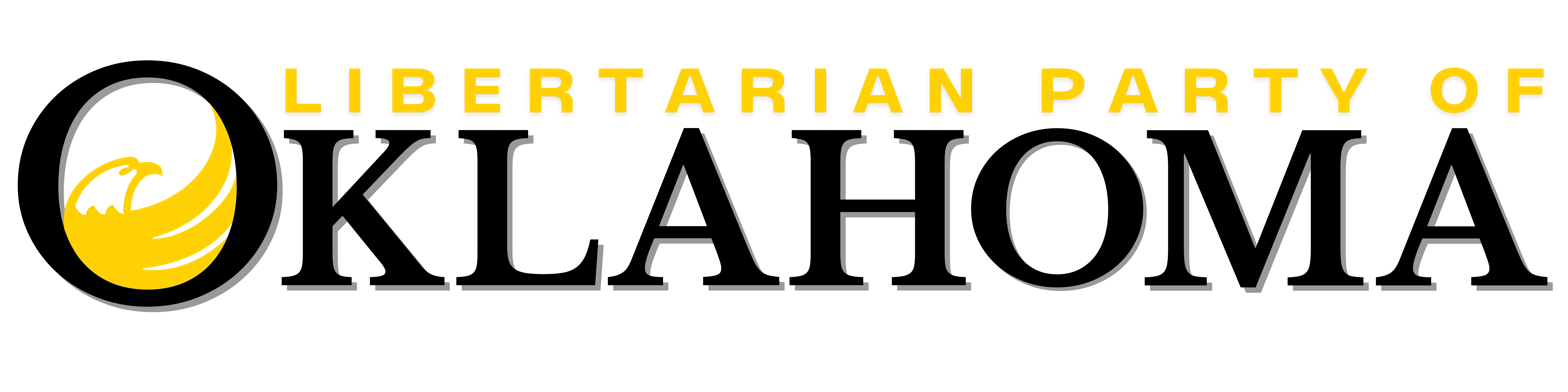
- Chairperson: Jake Spann
- Founded: 1972
- Ideology: Libertarianism
- National affiliation: Libertarian Party (United States)
- Colors: a shade of grey; a shade of yellow; black
- Statewide Executive Offices: 0 / 12
- Seats in the Oklahoma Senate: 0 / 48
- Seats in the Oklahoma House of Representatives: 0 / 101
- Seats in the United States Senate: 0 / 2
- Seats in the United States House of Representatives: 0 / 5
- Chiefs of the Five Tribes: 0 / 5
- Osage Executives: 0 / 2
- Other elected officials: 12 (April 2025)

Website
- oklp.org

The Oklahoma Libertarian Party is the state affiliate of the national Libertarian Party in Oklahoma. It has been active in state politics since the 1970s, but due to Oklahoma's ballot access requirements the party has only sporadically been an officially recognized party during its existence. In 2016, The Oklahoma Libertarian Party regained ballot access. The state party has secured ballot access through at least 2024.

== State party organization ==
=== State party affiliates and chairs ===
As of April 2025, the state party's Chair is Jake Spann. Other state officers are Vice Chair Kiefer Perry and Treasurer/Secretary John Hooper. Former state chairs include Will Daugherty, James Beau Thouvenel, Kevin Hobbie, Chad Williams, Erin Adams, Tina Kelly, Steve Long, Seth Wheeler, Clark Duffe, Angelia O'Dell, Jimmy Cook, Steve Galpin, Chris Powell, Richard Prawdzienski, Robert Murphy, D. Frank Robinson, Tom Laurent, Gordon Mobley and Porter Davis.

== Lawsuits ==
=== 1976 ===
The campaign of Eugene McCarthy won a ruling from the Oklahoma Supreme Court to place it's Independent electors on the ballot. The American Party, Communist Party, and OKLP all sought to have their candidates and electors put on the ballot as well. The Court ruled against the American Party, distinguishing between an Independent candidate and a candidate of a political party that has not met the requirements for recognition in the state of Oklahoma. After ruling against the American Party, the Court saw no need to hear similar cases brought by the Communist Party and the OKLP.

=== Arutunoff v. Oklahoma State Election Board ===
The OKLP challenged revocation of their official recognition, and ability to run candidates under the party label, by the state after the 1980 elections. State law required a party's presidential candidate to receive at least 10% of the vote to maintain ballot access. The 10th Circuit upheld the ruling against the OKLP.

=== 1984 cases ===
With 90 days to gather over 44,000 signatures and hampered by both bad weather and harassment over petitioning on public property, the OKLP fell short; it gathered only 28,894 names. One day after being denied ballot access, the party filed suit claiming Oklahoma's ballot access laws were unconstitutional. The party won by default when the Attorney General's office missed a deadline to file a response during the proceedings after the lead attorney mistakenly believed his deadline was five days later. Twenty Libertarian candidates were nominated at a state convention. After obtaining ballot status, the party also challenged state laws that guaranteed candidates' ballot order be listed by party in order of number of affiliated members. At the time, Democrats outnumbered Republicans 3-to-1 in the state and always appeared at the top of the ballot. The ballot order law would later be found unconstitutional and in 1996 was replaced with determining ballot order by lottery. Two petitioners were arrested and a third ticketed while gathering signatures at the State Fairgrounds. Ballot drive chairman D. Frank Robinson challenged the legality of the arrests, resulting in a ruling from Judge David Russell upholding the right to petition on public property.

=== Rainbow Coalition v. Oklahoma State Election Board ===
The Rainbow Coalition, OKLP, and the Populist Party sought to overturn the state's ballot access law, challenging both the petitioning deadline and the signature requirement. The 10th Circuit upheld Judge Stephanie Seymour's decision against the plaintiffs that upheld the ballot access law.

=== Atherton v. Ward ===
After the OKLP lost official recognition following the 1996 election the state election board changed the affiliation of all registered Libertarian voters to Independent. During the time since the ruling in Rainbow Coalition v. Oklahoma State Election Board the state's voter rolls had been completely computerized. Oklahoma Libertarians sought to be able to continue to be registered with their party of choice. Judge Wayne Alley ruled in favor of the party. The resulting process was that once a party fails to retain ballot access all those registered with the party are changed to Independent but any voter would be allowed to register with the previously recognized party for up to four years after they lost official status. In 2003, Ed Henke sought to be a candidate in a special election for state Senate, but was prohibited from filing because of his Libertarian registration.

=== Clingman v. Beaver ===
Oklahoma has a semi-closed primary system in which a political party may choose either to allow only voters registered as affiliated with the party to participate or to also allow Independents as well. The OKLP wanted the ability to more fully exercise their freedom of association by allowing voters registered with any other party to also participate in their primaries. The party won on appeal but the case then went to the Supreme Court where the decision of the 10th Circuit was overturned.

=== Yes on Term Limits v. Savage ===
Former Libertarian Party national director Paul Jacob worked with Oklahomans in Action to gather signatures on an initiative to put a Taxpayer Bill of Rights measure on the ballot for a statewide vote. In 2007, Jacob and two others were indicted for out-of-state petitioners. A conviction would have carried a maximum fine of $25,000, and the maximum jail sentence of ten years in prison. The state statute criminalizing the hiring of out-of-state petitioners was overturned by the 10th Circuit followed by a denial of Attorney General Drew Edmondson's request for an en banc rehearing at which point the charges were dropped as the statute was unenforceable.

=== Barr v. Ziriax ===
LP presidential nominee Bob Barr, seeking to get on the ballot as an Independent, challenged Oklahoma's 3% petition requirement. Judge David Russell issued a short decision against Barr. Russell has a history of upholding ballot access restrictions.

=== Oklahoma Libertarian Party v. Ziriax ===
After gathering over 57,000 signatures to meet the requirement of 51,739 to obtain ballot access for the 2012 elections, the OKLP sought a preliminary injunction due to the deadline to submit the petition being moved up to March 1 from May 1. Judge Timothy D. DeGiusti denied the injunction, resulting in the OKLP not being able to place candidates on the ballot in 2012. The March 1 petition deadline for political parties remains in place.

=== Lawhorn v. Ziriax ===
The only alternative party to have ballot access for the 2012 United States presidential election in Oklahoma was the Americans Elect party which was not fielding a candidate. Leadership of the state party organization for Americans Elect, including chair Rex Lawhorn, sought to have Libertarian presidential candidate Gary Johnson placed on the Oklahoma ballot as the Americans Elect candidate. The national party organization opposed the effort and the Oklahoma Supreme Court ruled against Lawhorn. This resulted in Oklahoma voters being allowed only two choices for president for the third election in a row.

=== McCraw v. Oklahoma City ===
The OKLP joined several other individuals and organizations in challenging an ordinance enacted by the City of Oklahoma City to restrict panhandling. OKLP Vice-chair Tina Kelly was involved in the case as it pertained to restricting the ability to engage in political petitioning. The city amended the ordinance to focus on pedestrian safety. In December 2018, Judge Joe L. Heaton upheld the ordinance but on appeal the 10th Circuit found in favor of the plaintiffs.

== Election history ==
=== Presidential elections ===
The Libertarian Party's nominee appeared on Oklahoma's presidential ballot in the 1980s and 1990s, before losing ballot access after the 2000 election. Since 2016, the Libertarian Party's nominee has appeared on every Oklahoma presidential ballot.

The party had the national party's presidential candidate on the ballot in 1980 (1.2% of the statewide vote was received), 1984 (0.7% of the statewide vote was received), 1988 (0.5% of the statewide vote was received), 1992 (0.3% of the statewide vote was received), 1996 (0.5% of the statewide vote was received), 2000 (0.5% of the statewide vote was received), 2016 (5.8% of the statewide vote received), and 2020 (1.6% of the statewide vote received).

=== 1976 ===
Oklahoma city restaurateur John Vernon 20.22% of the vote for the vice-presidential nomination at the Libertarian National Convention. Running as an Independent, Porter Davis got 36% of the vote for State House in district 88. Davis would later be elected to one term as a state Representative as a Republican in 1982.

=== 1980 ===
The party successfully petitioned for ballot access in the state for the first time and in addition to Ed Clark for president had four candidates for office including Jim Rushing and Frank Robinson who faced each other for the 5th Congressional District nomination as well as Anne Hill and Agnes Wampler, who both sought to become the Tulsa County Clerk in the first Libertarian Party primaries in Oklahoma. Rushing won with 54% of the vote while Hill took over 90%.

=== 1984 ===
After failing to get the required number of signatures for ballot access, the party sued and was ordered on the ballot for 1984. There were no primaries as the court order stipulated that the party nominate by convention. In addition to David Bergland for president, 16 Libertarians ran for office in the state. Agnes Regier received 2.2% of the vote in a three-way race for a Corporation Commission seat while three state legislature candidates, Alice Cody, Paul Woodward, and Robert Chambers, and County Clerk candidates Vickie Rhodes in Tulsa County and Ralph Schultz in Oklahoma County finished with vote percentages in double digits.

=== 1988 ===
The Libertarian and Populist parties along with the Rainbow Coalition sought to have Oklahoma's restrictive ballot access law overturned, but the 10th Circuit ruled against them. Nevertheless, the LP was able to gather enough signatures to get on the ballot, with Ron Paul personally submitting the petition. Paul received 6,261 votes, more than twice the total of Lenora Fulani of the New Alliance Party who was the other alternative presidential candidate on the ballot in Oklahoma.

=== 1992 ===
In pursuit of 50-state access, the LP was able to gather enough signatures to get Andre Marrou on the ballot. He finished fourth behind George H. W. Bush, Bill Clinton, and Ross Perot.

=== 1996 ===
After getting Andre Marrou on the ballot in 1992 as an independent, the party again successfully petitioned to run candidates in 1996. Agnes Regier defeated Michael Clem in a primary for the US Senate nomination and earned 1.2% of the vote in the general election, finishing fourth in a five-person race.

=== 2000 ===
Successfully petitioning for ballot access again, 14 Libertarians ran for office in the state alongside presidential candidate Harry Browne. Richard Prawdzienksi, Roger Bloxham and Whitney Boutin faced off in a primary for a seat on the Corporation Commission, resulting in Bloxham and Boutin heading to a runoff. Despite finishing in first place with almost 42%, Boutin dropped out of the race allowing Bloxham to be nominated. This saved the state over $200,000 for the cost of the runoff election. Bloxham would finish with 1.8% of the vote in the general election. The party ran candidates in all six Congressional races, besting the Democrats who only contested five. State House candidates Steve Galpin and Chris Powell both received double-digit percentages in their races.

=== 2016 ===
In 2014 the signature requirement to get a party on the ballot was changed from 5% of the vote for president or governor was lowered from 5% to 3%. On March 21, 2016, the Oklahoma Election Board declared the Libertarian Party to have turned in enough petition signatures to attain ballot status. In another legislative victory, on May 5 Governor Mary Fallin signed legislation reducing the number of votes necessary for a party to retain ballot access from 10% of the presidential or gubernatorial vote to 2.5%. LP presidential candidate Gary Johnson polled as high as 13% in the state.

In addition to Johnson, there were seventeen Libertarian candidates for state or federal office in Oklahoma in 2016. Robert Murphy defeated Dax Ewbank for the U.S. Senate nomination in the only statewide primary for any party on June 28.

The Johnson/Weld ticket received 83,481 votes in Oklahoma, 5.8% of the total, far surpassing previous results for LP presidential candidates and maintaining ballot access for the party for 2018. Robert T. Murphy finished third in a field of five in the U.S. Senate race with 3%. Zachary Knight garnered 6.1% running for CD5 and in CD4 4.3% voted for Sevier White. Of the two Libertarian candidates for state Senate, Frank Grove got over 35% in District 35 while Richard Prawdzienski was favored by 4.5% in District 41. In the state House the OKLP fielded nine candidates, including Steve Long, Gene Bell, Christina Wright, Tamara Morton, Erin Adams, Zac Davis and Dr. Shannon Grimes as well as Elle Collins, who took over 7% of the vote in District 87 which was won by Collin Walke with a plurality of 48%, and Clarke Duffe, who was supported by 23.5% of the voters in district 39.

The sole LP candidate for a county office in the state was Chris Powell who sought to become the Oklahoma County Clerk. Facing GOP nominee David B. Hooten, Powell received 89,019 votes, 36.4% of the total.

=== 2018 ===
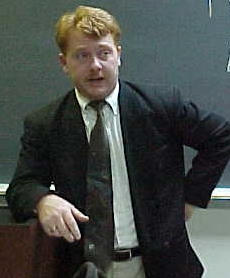
Former OKLP Chair and 2018 gubernatorial nominee Chris Powell

On the ballot for a gubernatorial election for the first time, the OKLP had three individuals seek the nomination for the state's highest executive office. In the primary on June 26, former state chair Chris Powell received 49%, just 40 votes away from winning the nomination outright. Rex Lawhorn received 31%. The third candidate, zookeeper Joe Exotic, finished with 19%. With no candidate achieving a majority, the race went to a runoff between Lawhorn and Powell on August 28, which Powell won with 59%. This was the first Libertarian primary runoff election in the nation. Powell received 40,833 votes in the general election, 3.4% of the total. This was the highest percentage for any of the 23 Libertarian gubernatorial candidates on the ballot on Nov. 6th.

Other Libertarian candidates were Dr. John Yeutter for Oklahoma State Auditor and Inspector, Richard Castaldo for US House Dist. 2, seven candidates for Oklahoma House of Representatives: Lee Miller (HD68), Kelli Krebs (HD75), Gene Bell (HD78), William Cagle (HD 84), Stephen Paulsen (HD85), and Paul Brewbaker (HD 95), as well as Marcus Hall who ran for the office of County Commissioner in Canadian County, Dist. #1 and Rachel L. Bussett who was in a non-partisan contest seeking to become an Associate District Judge for Canadian County.

Yeutter received over 270 thousand votes (24.8%) in his race, the highest total for any alternative party candidate ever in Oklahoma. Both Yeutter and Powell achieved greater than 2.5%, so the OKLP retained ballot access through at least 2022. Hall had the highest percentage in a partisan race with 27.49% and Bussett came very close to winning nonpartisan judicial office with 47.8%.

=== 2020 ===
Two Libertarians, Todd Hagopian and Brandon Swearengin, sought election to school boards in the first part of the year. Hagopian finished third for seeking a spot on the Bixby school board on Feb. 11th. Swearengin's race against an oil executive was postponed due to the coronavirus pandemic from April 7 to June 30. Swearengin earned 45.4% of the vote.

For the state and federal elections in the fall, Hagopian stepped up to run for Corporation Commission to face an otherwise unopposed incumbent. Robert Murphy was a candidate for U S Senate. Sevier White and Richie Costaldo ran for Congress in districts 4 and 1, respectively. Greg Sadler was in a two-way contest for state Senate in district 17. A.J. Bailey sought election to the state House in district 101. And Bud Jeffrey challenged the incumbent for Pottawatomie County Court Clerk. Voters in the portion of Pottawatomie County within state Senate District 17 will have three two-candidate races featuring a Libertarian versus a Republican, and a total of five Libertarians on their local ballots to vote for.

Hagopian received over 345,000 votes (23.9%) in his race, the highest vote total for any alternative party candidate ever in Oklahoma. Hagopian achieved greater than 2.5%, so the OKLP retained ballot access through at least 2024. Hagopian had the highest percentage in a partisan race with 23.9%.

== Office holders ==
In August 2018 David Greer was appointed to fill a vacancy on the nonpartisan City Council of Dougherty, Oklahoma, becoming the first Libertarian to hold elective office in the state. He was re-elected unopposed in May, 2020.

On April 2, 2019, Chad Williams was elected to the Choctaw City Council and Josh Clark was elected to Dale School Board in nonpartisan elections, becoming the first Libertarians to win elections to office in Oklahoma.

In a special election to fill an unexpired term, Chris Powell was elected on Nov. 12, 2019 to the Bethany City Council, defeating two other candidates by receiving 63% of the vote. Powell was named Vice-Mayor beginning July 1, 2020 and re-elected to full term with 76% of the vote on Feb. 9, 2021.

On April 6, 2021, Troy Brooks won election to the Alva City Council with 52.6% of the vote in a nonpartisan election.

Anthony Garcia was appointed to fill the remaining term of a retiring board member of Francis Tuttle Technology Center on April 12, 2021. He was unopposed for election to a full term.

Dillon Feazel was unopposed for a seat on the Altus City Council, being sworn in on April 12, 2021. In May he changed his voter registration party affiliation to Libertarian.

In April 2025, Roger Dale Merrill became the first Libertarian to hold mayoral office in Oklahoma after his election as the mayor of Beggs.

== See also ==
- Green Party of Oklahoma
- Oklahoma Democratic Party
- Oklahoma Republican Party
- Politics of Oklahoma
- Two-party system
- Third parties
