= Deters =

The German family name "Deters" is of patronymic origin, meaning it was inspired by the father of the initial bearer. In this instance it means "Son of Deter", the latter being a shortened version of the old Germanic name "Diethard" which was derived from Old High German words "Diot", meaning "people", and "Harbi" meaning "hard" or "tough".

Early references to the surname "Deters" include a record of Johann Deters, the son of Jochim Deters who was Christened on 22 November, 1686 in Ruhn, Mecklenburg. The wedding of Cordt Deters and Crinck Evers was celebrated on 6 August 1684 in The Church of Saint Margaret in Padderhorn, Westphalia. Eilert Deters, the son of Johann Deters and Anna Wedemayer, was born on 16 February 1766 in Leuchtenberg, Lower Saxony.

Notable bearers of the Deters name include theologian Brandanus Deters who died in 1710, and Joe Deters, an American politician.

The Deters name was introduced to North America as early as 1840 with the arrival of Lambert Heinrich Deters, a native of the region of Westphalia, and Jan Heinrich Klein-Deters, a native of Alte Piccardie, Germany, who settled with four of his brothers in the settlement of Countship Michigan (which is now part of the city of Holland, Michigan) in approximately 1848.

The surname may refer to:

- Harold Deters (born 1944), American football placekicker
- Joe Deters (born 1957), American politician
- Thorben Deters (born 1995), German footballer
- Citizens for Tax Reform v. Deters, 2008 Ohio lawsuit

== See also ==
- Auguste Deter (1850–1906), first person diagnosed with Alzheimer's disease
