= Politics of Oklahoma =

Oklahoma Politics

United States presidential election results for Oklahoma
Year	Republican		Democratic		Third party(ies)	
Year	No.	%	No.	%	No.	%
1908	110,474	43.33%	122,363	47.99%	22,146	8.69%
1912	90,786	35.77%	119,156	46.95%	43,859	17.28%
1916	97,233	33.25%	148,113	50.65%	47,070	16.10%
1920	243,831	50.11%	217,053	44.61%	25,726	5.29%
1924	226,242	42.82%	255,798	48.41%	46,375	8.78%
1928	394,046	63.72%	219,174	35.44%	5,207	0.84%
1932	188,165	26.70%	516,468	73.30%	0	0.00%
1936	245,122	32.69%	501,069	66.83%	3,549	0.47%
1940	348,872	42.23%	474,313	57.41%	3,027	0.37%
1944	319,424	44.20%	401,549	55.57%	1,663	0.23%
1948	268,817	37.25%	452,782	62.75%	0	0.00%
1952	518,045	54.59%	430,939	45.41%	0	0.00%
1956	473,769	55.13%	385,581	44.87%	0	0.00%
1960	533,039	59.02%	370,111	40.98%	0	0.00%
1964	412,665	44.25%	519,834	55.75%	0	0.00%
1968	449,697	47.68%	301,658	31.99%	191,731	20.33%
1972	759,025	73.70%	247,147	24.00%	23,728	2.30%
1976	545,708	49.96%	532,442	48.75%	14,101	1.29%
1980	695,570	60.50%	402,026	34.97%	52,112	4.53%
1984	861,530	68.61%	385,080	30.67%	9,066	0.72%
1988	678,367	57.93%	483,423	41.28%	9,246	0.79%
1992	592,929	42.65%	473,066	34.02%	324,364	23.33%
1996	582,315	48.26%	488,105	40.45%	136,293	11.29%
2000	744,337	60.31%	474,276	38.43%	15,616	1.27%
2004	959,792	65.57%	503,966	34.43%	0	0.00%
2008	960,165	65.65%	502,496	34.35%	0	0.00%
2012	891,325	66.77%	443,547	33.23%	0	0.00%
2016	949,136	65.32%	420,375	28.93%	83,481	5.75%
2020	1,020,280	65.37%	503,890	32.29%	36,529	2.34%
2024	1,036,213	66.16%	499,599	31.90%	30,361	1.94%

The politics of Oklahoma exists in a framework of a presidential republic modeled after the United States. The governor of Oklahoma is both head of state and head of government, and of a pluriform two-party system. Executive power is exercised by the governor and the government. Legislative power is vested in the governor and the bicameral Oklahoma Legislature. Judicial power is vested in the judiciary of Oklahoma. The political system is laid out in the 1907 Oklahoma Constitution.

Oklahoma is currently categorized politically as conservative. The state has a history of Democratic state government dominance. Oklahoma came into being as a state at the height of the era of Jim Crow Laws and had a Ku Klux Klan presence in the 1920s. Race politics gave way to Democratic political infighting over the New Deal in the 1930s and 1940s and the gradual growth of the Oklahoma Republican Party's power. As a result, Oklahoma has voted for Republican presidential candidates all but once since 1952 (in 1964), with the Democratic candidate having failed to pick up a single county in the state in all elections since 2004. Today all of Oklahoma's federal offices and statewide offices, plus both chambers of the state legislature (with supermajorities), are either held by the Republican Party or are non-partisan.

Until 1964, Oklahoma was considered a "swing state" in American politics, shifting back and forth in its support for the two major parties. This was in part due to Oklahoma's situation both as a part of the Great Plains states, which tended to be reliably Republican, and the South, which was heavily Democratic at that time. Between statehood and 1964, the state voted for the losing candidate just three times, in 1908, 1924, and 1960. However, Oklahoma voters would split their political allegiances by electing Democrats for local government, but Republicans for national office.

== History ==
=== Early history ===
Prior to statehood, Republicans dominated Oklahoma Territory politics. However, from statehood through World War I, Oklahoma was dominated by the Democratic Party, with the Republican Party and the Socialist Party vying to challenge the Democratic Party's dominance. The 2nd Oklahoma Legislature included Oklahoma's first Black member, Republican A. C. Hamlin, but passed legislation that made it nearly impossible for African-Americans to seek elective office, which limited him to one term. In the 1910s, the Oklahoma Legislature included Socialists, but the only bill they sponsored that became law involved hunting. Socialists were also elected to local office and received the nation's highest vote count per capita for the party's candidate, Eugene V. Debs in 1916. The Jim Crow Law in Oklahoma was struck down by the United States Supreme Court, but a special session was called by the Democratic governor and focused on voting laws that limited black voter participation. The Ku Klux Klan and the civil rights struggles of the World War I era came to Oklahoma in the 1920s, leading to the Tulsa race massacre, lynchings and other violence. Following the practical destruction of the Socialist party in the aftermath of the Green Corn Rebellion, state politics became a two-party system that continued to exclude black voters.

=== New Deal coalition ===
At the U.S. Presidential level, Oklahoma's electoral college vote was a reliable part of Franklin D. Roosevelt's "New Deal" coalition (which began in the U.S. election of 1932). Oklahoma did support President Eisenhower in 1952 and 1956, but then returned to supporting the Democrats in 1964 (Oklahoma split its electoral college vote Nixon–Byrd 7–1, due to a maverick elector, commonly referred to as a faithless elector, in 1960).

During this same period, Oklahoma's Governors, legislature, and delegation to Congress continued to be dominated by the Democratic Party. However, there was political infighting over deficit spending in the late 1930s, leading to a successful bipartisan push for a 1941 constitutional amendment requiring legislators to pass a balanced budget. Leon C. Phillips, who opposed New Deal programs, rose to prominence, first as Speaker of the Oklahoma House of Representatives and later as governor.

=== Southern strategy ===
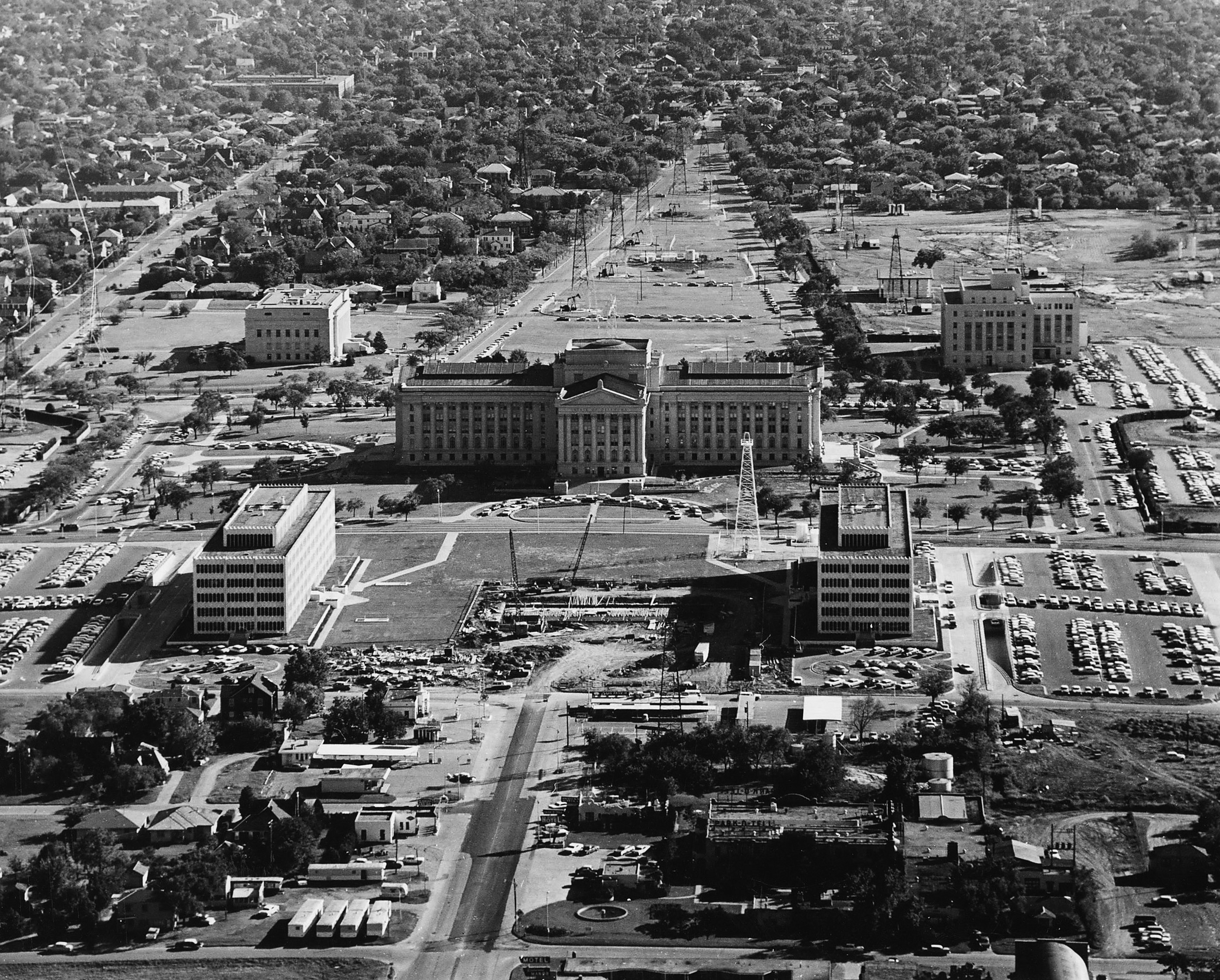
Oklahoma State Capitol in 1963.

During the presidential campaign in 1968, Oklahoma was targeted by the Republican Party to be included in what was called the Southern Strategy. Beginning with the second Presidential campaign of Richard Nixon (who appealed to Oklahoma voters on the issue of law and order), Oklahoma gradually changed in its voting pattern in national elections to become an increasingly reliable Republican state for presidential tickets. President George W. Bush carried Oklahoma twice (by a wide margin), in 2000 and 2004, for example. Starting with the 2004 election results, every county in Oklahoma has gone to the Republican candidate. In 2008, Oklahoma was the only state in which every county was carried by John McCain.

Gradually, the success of the Republican Party began to translate into Congressional, legislative, and other local political races.

=== 21st century ===
By the start of the 21st century, conservative Republicans increased their strength in Oklahoma on the statewide level, but Democrats were still a major factor in statewide politics. This began to change in 2004, when the Republicans took control of the state House for only the second time ever, and the first time since 1922. In 2006, incumbent Democratic governor Brad Henry won re-election to a second term in a landslide, taking 66% of the vote against former Republican Congressman Ernest Istook, and carrying every county except the three in the strongly Republican Oklahoma Panhandle. Despite this landslide Democratic victory, the Republicans gained two seats in the State Senate (resulting in a 24–24 tie, although the Democratic Party held the tie-breaking Lieutenant Governor's vote) and increased their lead in the House to 57–44.

In 2008, the Republicans gained two state senate seats, taking control 26–22 of that chamber for the first time in state history, while increasing their membership in the state House to a 61–40 advantage. The Republicans thus had complete control of the state legislature for the first time ever. In addition, Oklahoma was the only state where John McCain carried every county (even though Democrats still had a majority of registered voters).

The 2010 statewide election saw a historic sweep, as for the first time in Oklahoma history, the GOP won every statewide office up for election that year. In 2010, the GOP increased its majority in the House by six seats and in the Senate by five seats. (One seat, State Senate District 47, was vacant, as incumbent Todd Lamb was elected Lieutenant Governor, and was filled by special election in January 2011.) The Republicans thus had complete control of state government for the first time ever. On the Congressional front, Tom Coburn held his U.S. Senate seat and the GOP maintained control of the four House seats it held, and came within 6 points of taking Oklahoma's 2nd congressional district, the only Oklahoman Congressional seat not held by the GOP. No Democrat has won a statewide election in Oklahoma since, although incumbent Superintendent of Public Instruction Joy Hofmeister, who was elected twice as a Republican, switched her affiliation to Democratic in 2021 and retired in 2023.

In the 2012 statewide election, the GOP captured the 2nd District seat, and thus held every statewide office as well as the entire Congressional delegation. The GOP also increased its majorities in the Oklahoma Legislature by four seats in the Oklahoma House of Representatives for a total of 71 seats and one in the Oklahoma Senate for a total of 32 seats. In both cases, the GOP gained a supermajority. The 2014 statewide election saw the GOP maintain its hold of all the statewide and Congressional seats (all five House seats and, due to both James Inhofe's seat being up for re-election and Tom Coburn resigning his seat mid-term, both Senate seats), its hold of its 71 seats in the House, and increase its Senate bloc to 39 seats. However, in 2018, Republican Representative Steve Russell from the 5th congressional district was defeated in his second reelection bid by Democratic nominee Kendra Horn, marking the first time a Democrat had been elected to the seat since 1974. This result reflected a growing shift in the Oklahoma City and Tulsa areas to the Democratic Party, as although Republicans won the district back in 2020 and carried it in the presidential election, Democrats won the area in the 2022 elections.

== Political institutions ==
As in the national government of the United States, power in Oklahoma is divided into three main branches: executive, legislative, and judicial.

=== Executive ===
The capital of the state is Oklahoma City and the Governor of Oklahoma is Kevin Stitt, a Republican. His first term began on January 14, 2019. The current Lieutenant Governor of Oklahoma is Republican Matt Pinnell. Pinnell concurrently serves, by virtue of his office as lieutenant governor, as the president of the Oklahoma Senate. The offices of the governor and lieutenant governor have four-year terms. The Governor is assisted by a Cabinet consisting of the assembled heads of the various executive departments called Secretaries. Of the Secretaries, the highest in rank is Secretary of State, currently Michael Rogers, a Republican, who is the only appointed executive officer under the Oklahoma Constitution.

Other statewide executive offices are contested in elections and serving four-year terms that run concurrent with that of the Governor, with the exception of the three members of the Oklahoma Corporation Commission. Those members serve staggered six-year terms, with one member's term up for election every two years.

==== Current executive branch ====
Office	Current Officer	Since	Party
Governor of Oklahoma	Kevin Stitt	January 14, 2019	Republican
Lieutenant Governor	Matt Pinnell	January 14, 2019	Republican
Secretary of State	Benjamin Lepak	October 1, 2025	Republican
State Auditor and Inspector	Cindy Byrd	January 14, 2019	Republican
Attorney General	Gentner Drummond	January 9, 2023	Republican
State Treasurer	Todd Russ	January 9, 2023	Republican
State School Superintendent	Lindel Fields	October 2, 2025	Republican
Labor Commissioner	Leslie Osborn	January 14, 2019	Republican
Insurance Commissioner	Glen Mulready	January 14, 2019	Republican
Corporation Commissioner (by length of tenure)	Todd Hiett	January 12, 2015	Republican
Corporation Commissioner	Kim David	January 12, 2023	Republican
Corporation Commissioner	Brian Bingman	January 13, 2025	Republican

=== Legislative ===
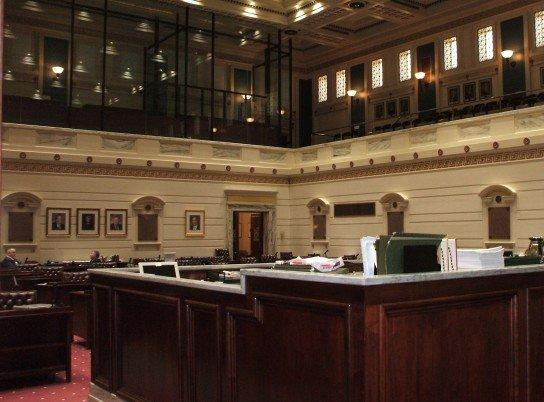
Chamber of the Oklahoma Senate

The state legislature is a bicameral body consisting of the Oklahoma Senate and Oklahoma House of Representatives, with members elected directly by the people. There are 48 state senators, each serving a staggered four-year term and 101 members of the Oklahoma House of Representatives, each serving a two-year term. Members of both houses are elected from single member districts of equal population.

The state has term limits for their legislature that restrict any one person to a total of twelve years service in both the House and Senate.

The state legislature convenes in regular session at noon each odd-numbered year on the first Monday in February. However, in the odd-numbered years following an election, the state legislature must meet on the first Tuesday after the first Monday in January for the sole purpose of determining the outcome of the statewide elections. The state constitution limits the state legislature to meeting 160 legislative days during each biennium. In addition, the legislature may not meet in regular session after the last Friday in May of each year.

==== Current composition ====
In the 58th Legislature, the Republicans control both houses with an 81–20 majority in the House and a 40–8 majority in the Senate.

The Oklahoma House of Representatives

Affiliation	Members
Republican Party	81
Democratic Party	20
Seat Vacant	0
Total	101

The Oklahoma Senate

Affiliation	Members
Republican Party	40
Democratic Party	8
Seat Vacant	0
Total	48

==== Current leadership ====
The Oklahoma House of Representatives

Main office-holders
Office	Name	Party	Since
Speaker of the Oklahoma House	Kyle Hilbert	Republican	January 7, 2025
Speaker Pro Tempore of the House	Anthony Moore	Republican	January 7, 2025
Majority Leader	Mark Lawson	Republican	January 7, 2025
Minority Leader	Cyndi Munson	Democratic	January 3, 2023

The Oklahoma Senate

Main office-holders
Office	Name	Party	Since
President of the Senate and Lieutenant Governor	Matt Pinnell	Republican	January 14, 2019
President Pro Tempore of the Oklahoma Senate	Lonnie Paxton	Republican	January 7, 2025
Majority Floor Leader	Julie Daniels	Republican	January 7, 2025
Minority Leader	Julia Kirt	Democratic	January 7, 2025

=== Judicial ===
The Judiciary of Oklahoma has six levels. Most cases start in the district courts, which are courts of general jurisdiction. The lowest level courts are the Municipal Courts which exist to oversee the administration of justice within cities and have jurisdiction only over the violation of city ordinances. Appeals from Municipal Courts are heard by District Courts. There are 77 District Courts, with each having either a single or multiple District Judges with at least one Associate District Judge to administer justice. Appeals from the District Courts and challenges to certain governmental decisions are heard by either the Oklahoma Court of Civil Appeals for civil appeals or the Oklahoma Court of Criminal Appeals for criminal appeals. The Court of Civil Appeals has twelve judges who sit in two-judge divisions and the Court of Criminal Appeals has five judges.

Two specialized courts within administrative agencies have been established, the Court of Tax Review hears disputes involving illegal taxes levied by county and city governments, and the Workers’ Compensation Court.

The nine-justice Oklahoma Supreme Court is the court of last resort for all civil appeals. The Court has appellate jurisdiction on all civil issues, the Court of Civil Appeals, the Court of Tax Review and the Worker's Compensation Court. The Court only has original jurisdiction when new first impression issues, or important issues of law, or matters of great public interest are at stake.

Within the Oklahoma court system there are two independent courts: the Oklahoma Court on the Judiciary which monitors the actions of all judges and justices and the Oklahoma Court of Impeachment, which is the Oklahoma Senate sitting, which acts serves as the only court that can remove the highest levels of state government officials from their offices.

Federal court cases are heard in the United States District Court for the Eastern District of Oklahoma based in Muskogee, the United States District Court for the Northern District of Oklahoma based in Tulsa, and the United States District Court for the Western District of Oklahoma based in Oklahoma City. Appeals are heard by the United States Court of Appeals for the Tenth Circuit based in Denver, Colorado.

== Federal representation ==
Map of Oklahoma showing all five congressional districts

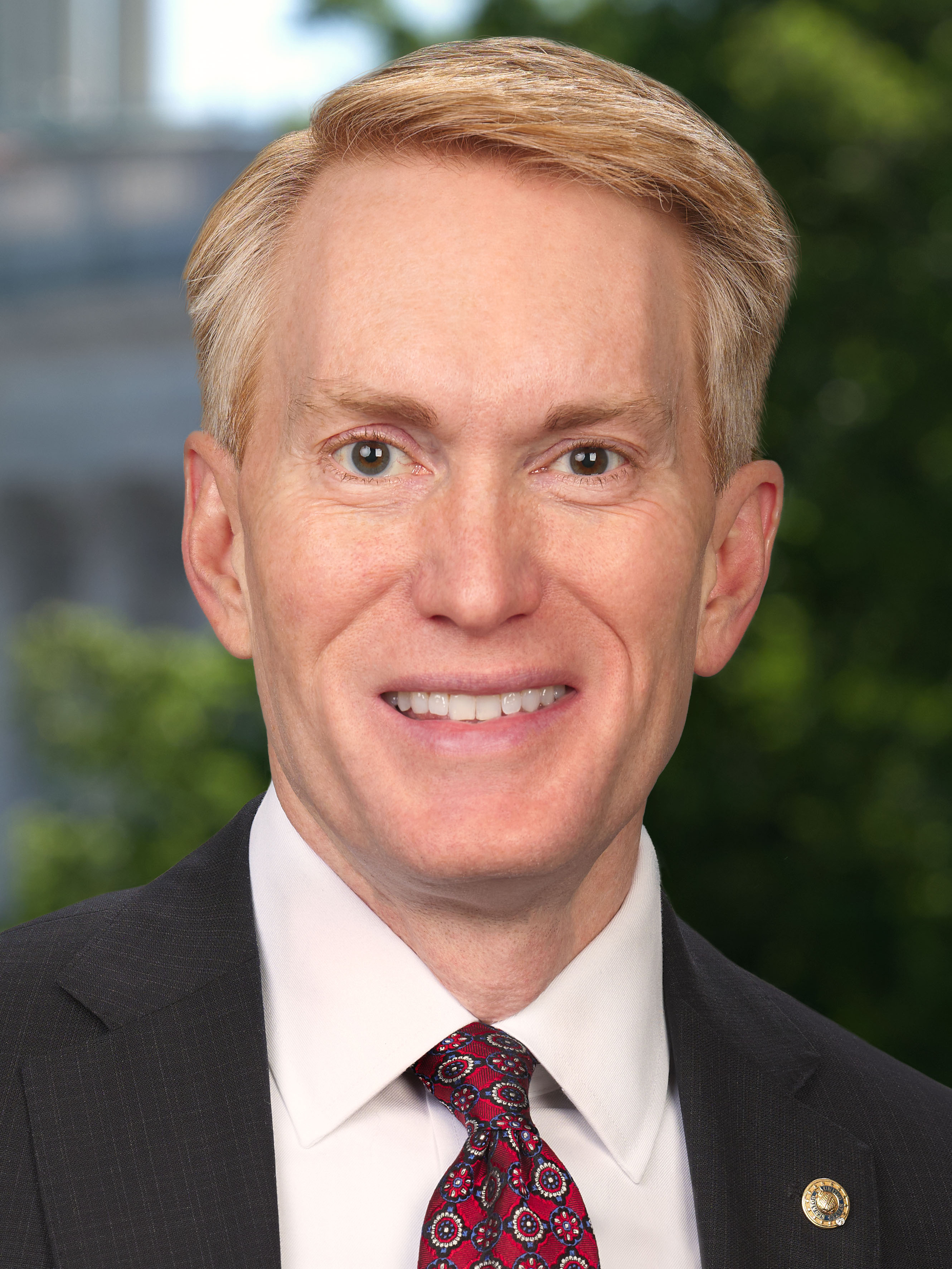
U.S. Senator James Lankford

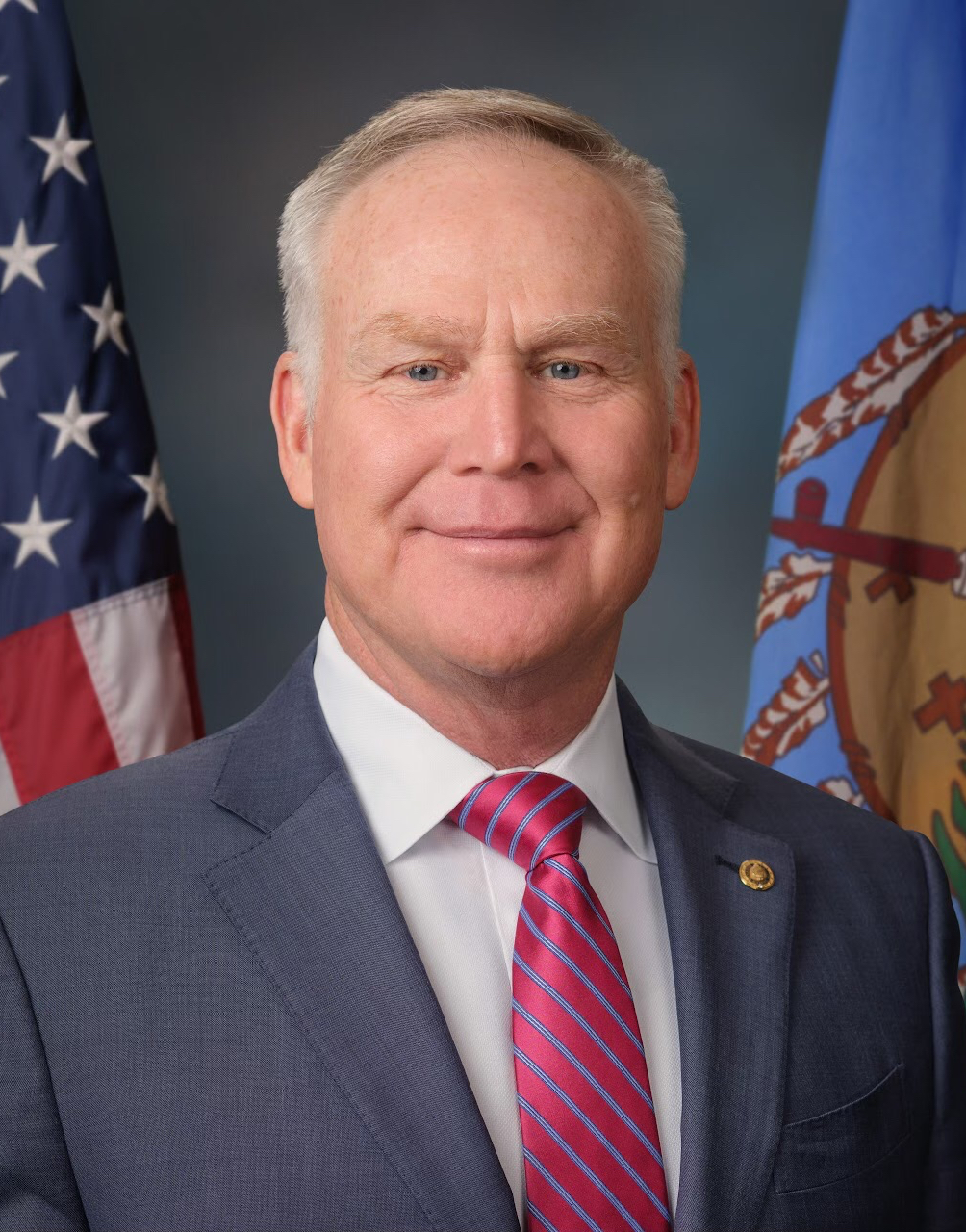
U.S. Senator Alan Armstrong

Oklahoma's two U.S. senators, Republicans James Lankford and Alan Armstrong, are elected at-large, serving since 2015 and 2026, respectively.

Oklahoma is currently represented by five congressional districts in the United States House of Representatives. At one point, Oklahoma had as many as eight congressional districts and as many as three at-large districts, but the state's sluggish population growth resulted in the state losing its seventh and eighth districts in 1953 and its sixth district in 2003.

Oklahoma's 1st congressional district is based in Tulsa and covers the northeastern corner of the state and it borders Kansas to the north. It is represented by Kevin Hern, a Republican.

Oklahoma's 2nd congressional district covers (approximately) the eastern one-fourth of the state, bordering Kansas to the north, Missouri and Arkansas to the east, and Texas along the Red River to the south. It is represented by Josh Brecheen, a Republican.

Oklahoma's 3rd congressional district covers western Oklahoma, from the Panhandle to the Tulsa suburbs, and borders New Mexico to the west, Colorado and Kansas to the north, and the Texas panhandle to the south. It is represented by Frank Lucas, a Republican.

Oklahoma's 4th congressional district covers south-central Oklahoma and borders Texas along the Red River to the south. It is represented by Tom Cole, a Republican.

Oklahoma's 5th congressional district, centered in Oklahoma City, covers central Oklahoma and borders all of the other congressional districts except District 1. It is represented by Stephanie Bice, a Republican.

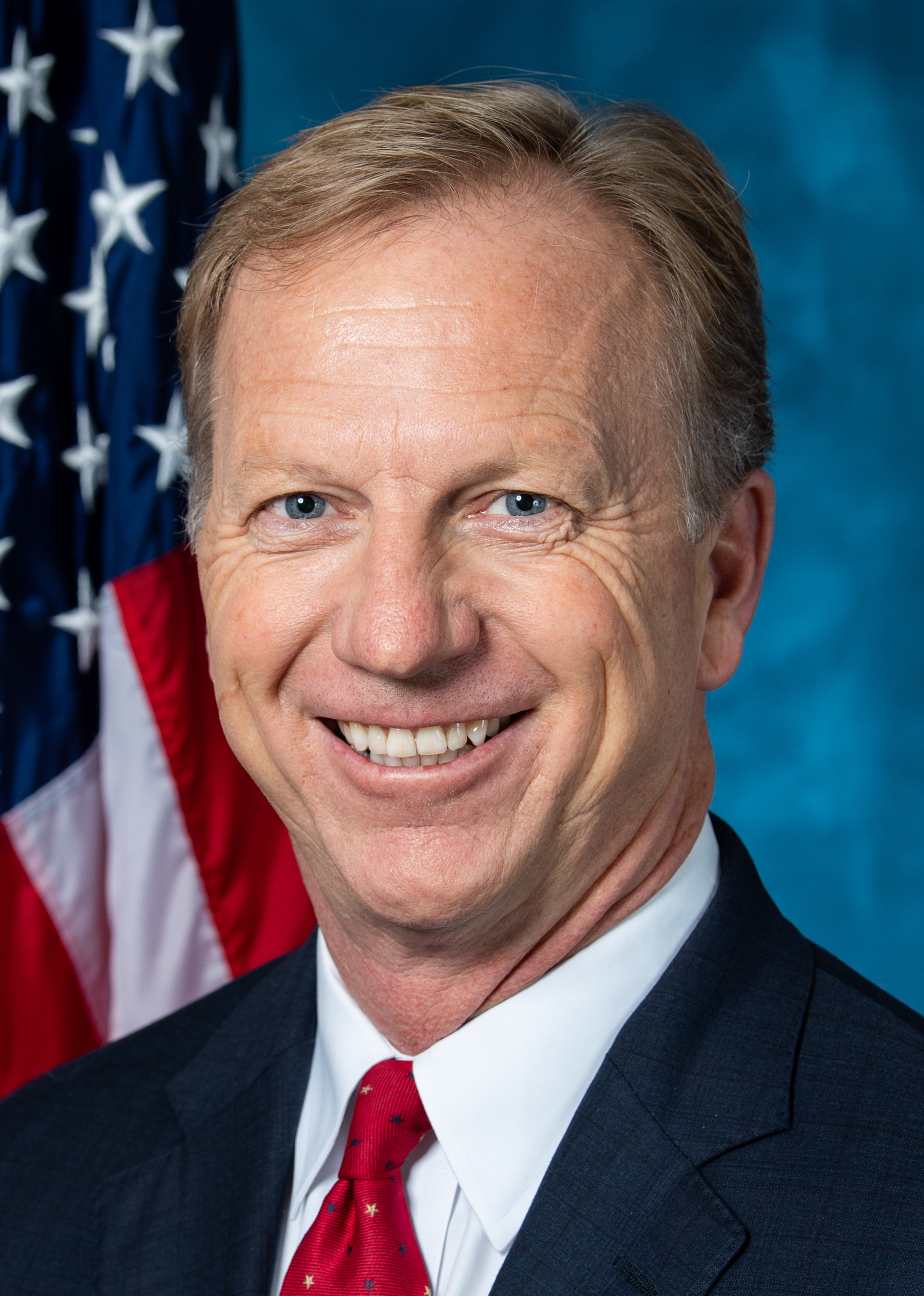
Kevin Hern, 1st district

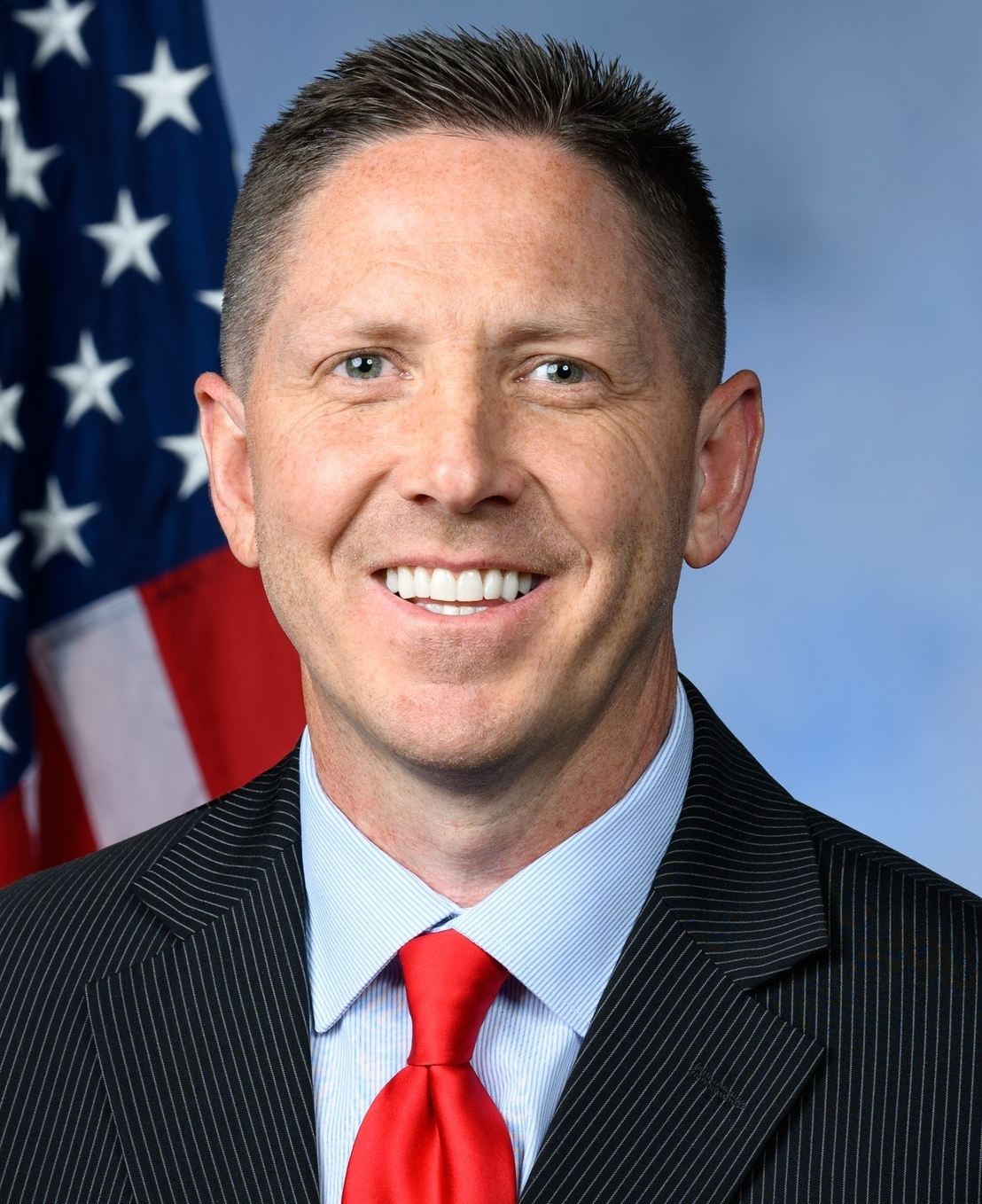
Josh Brecheen, 2nd district

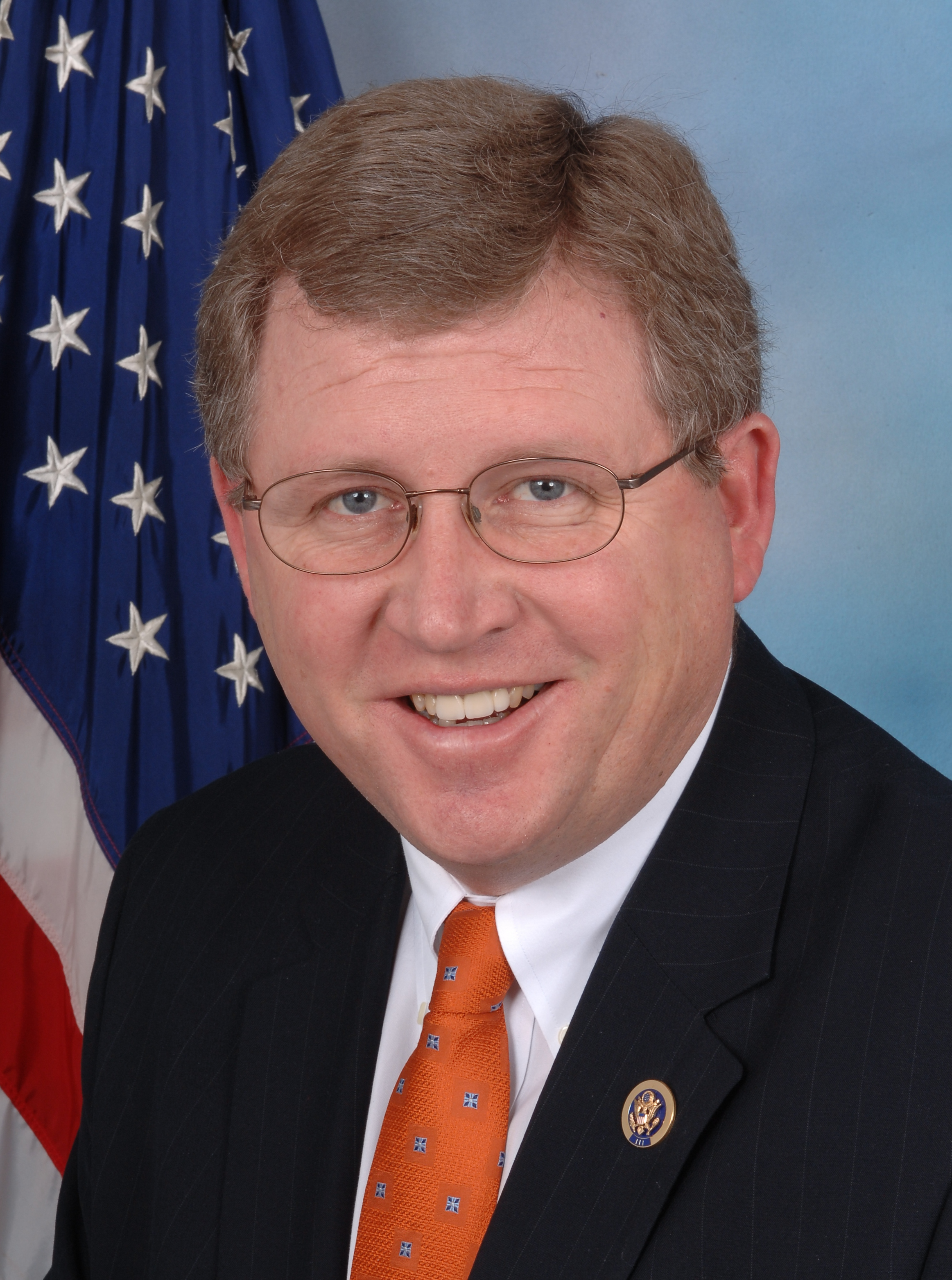
Frank Lucas, 3rd district

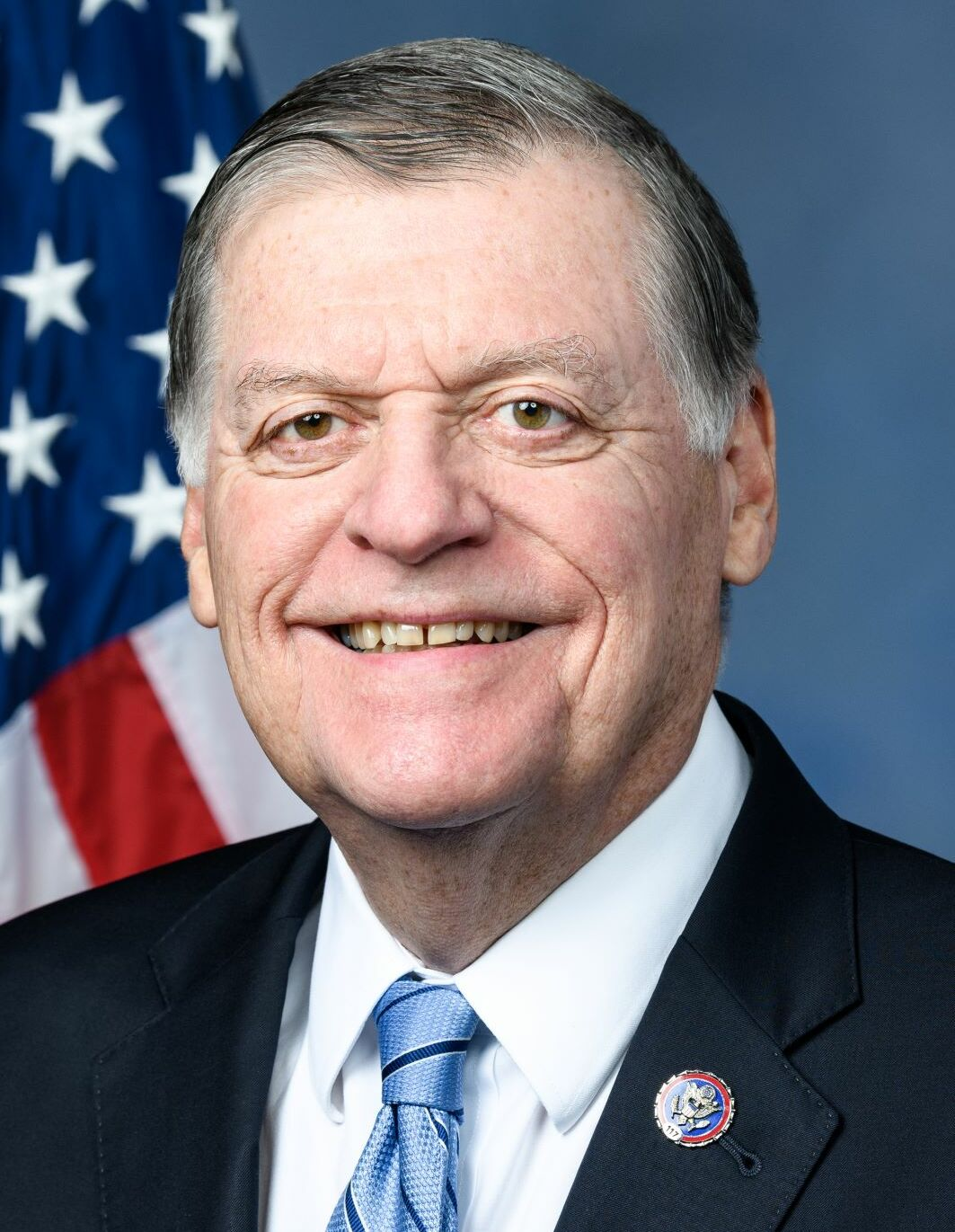
Tom Cole, 4th district

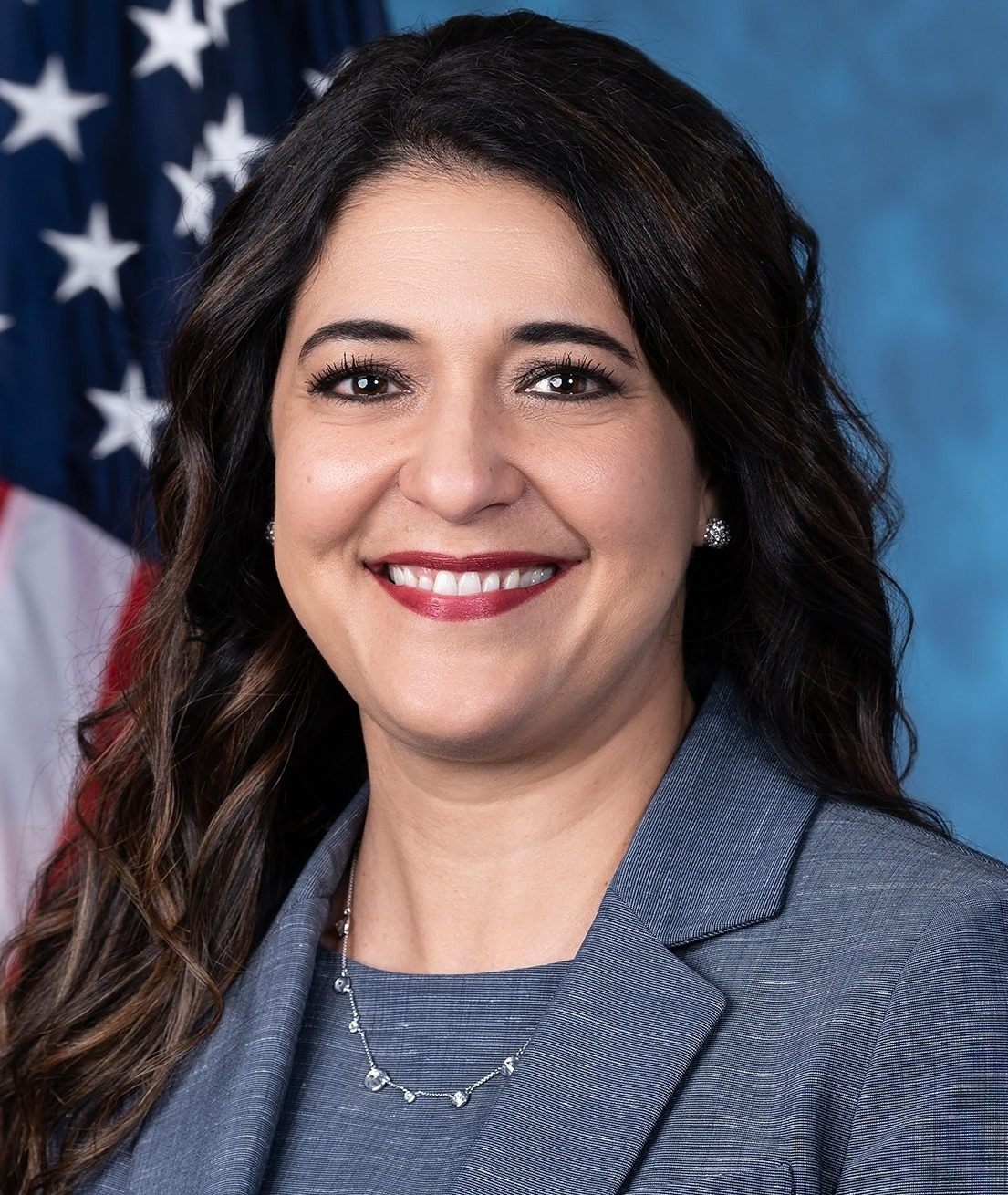
Stephanie Bice, 5th district

Oklahoma is part of the United States District Court for the Northern District of Oklahoma, the United States District Court for the Western District of Oklahoma, and the United States District Court for the Eastern District of Oklahoma in the federal judiciary. The district's cases are appealed to the Denver-based United States Court of Appeals for the Tenth Circuit.

== See also ==
- List of governors of Oklahoma
- List of politics by U.S. state or territory
- List of United States representatives from Oklahoma
- List of United States senators from Oklahoma
- Oklahoma Legislature
- Oklahoma's congressional delegations
- Oklahoma's congressional districts
- Party switching in the United States
- Political party strength in Oklahoma

Parties

- Green Party of Oklahoma
- Oklahoma Democratic Party
- Oklahoma Libertarian Party
- Oklahoma Republican Party
- Pirate Party of Oklahoma
- Socialist Party of Oklahoma
