= Citizens in Charge Foundation =

American non-profit advocacy organization

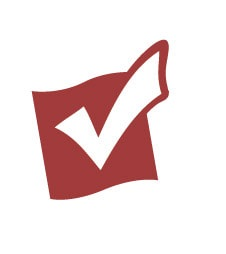
- Founded: 2001; 25 years ago
- Founder: Paul Jacob
- Tax ID no.: 13-4070270
- Legal status: 501(c)(3) nonprofit organization
- Purpose: To protect and expand the initiative and referendum rights of every American without regard to partisanship or politics.
- Location: Woodbridge, Virginia
- Region served: United States
- President: Paul Jacob
- Revenue: $1,277,393 (2016)
- Expenses: $1,190,744 (2016)
- Employees: 2 (2016)
- Website: www.citizensinchargefoundation.org

The Citizens in Charge Foundation (CCF) is a nonprofit, non-partisan organization that advocates in favor of direct democracy. It was founded by libertarian activist Paul Jacob who has served as its president since its founding in 2001.

== Activities ==
=== Litigation ===
- Filed an amicus brief written by Todd Graves in the successful case, Citizens for Tax Reform v. Deters, whereby Ohio's ban on paying petition circulators per signature was struck down in 2008. The state's appeal to the U.S. Supreme Court was denied.
- Filed Amicus curiae brief in Coalition to Defend Affirmative Action v. Granholm urging the court to allow the Michigan Civil Rights initiative Committee to intervene in the challenge to their successful initiative. The state officials handling the suit publicly opposed the initiative.
- Amicus curiae brief was filed in LetOhioVote.org v. Brunner, a case calling for Ohio to abide by its constitutional requirement that new gambling allowances must be put to a statewide vote.
- Funded research and negotiations with Nebraska's Secretary of State in, Mann v. Gale, wherein the Secretary of State agreed to standardize procedures used to verify signatures.
- Citizens in Charge, et al v. Miller challenged Nevada's narrow interpretation of the single-subject requirement for initiatives. This case was filed in federal district court in Nevada.
- Citizens in Charge v. Brunner challenged Ohio's arbitrary referendum title setting process. The case is pending in federal district court.
- CCF was represented by the American Civil Liberties Union in Citizens in Charge Foundation, Inc. v. Gale, which challenged Nebraska's residency requirement, county-based distribution requirement, and requirement that petitions indicate whether circulators are paid or volunteer.

=== Reports ===
In 2010, CICF released a state-by-state report card that "assesses the restrictions and accessibility each state provides for citizen-led ballot initiatives and referendums."

In the same year, Citizens in Charge Foundation and Citizens in Charge jointly commissioned Pulse Opinion Research to conduct a poll to determine public support for the initiative and referendum process.

== Citizens in Charge ==
Citizens in Charge is a 501(c)(4) advocacy organization started by Paul Jacob in 2001 that works directly with public officials and voters to protect and spread ballot initiative rights. Citizens in Charge and Citizens in Charge Foundation are separate organizations. Paul Jacob also serves as president of Citizens In Charge.
