= Robert Barnes (attorney) =

American lawyer (born 1974)

- Born: Robert Edward Barnes; April 11, 1974 (age 52); Chattanooga, Tennessee, U.S.
- Education: University of Tennessee at Chattanooga (BA); University of Wisconsin Law School (JD)
- Occupations: Criminal tax attorney, legal advocate, political commentator, and YouTuber
- Website: barneslawllp.com

Robert Edward Barnes (born April 11, 1974) is an American lawyer and political commentator. He is the co-host, with David Freiheit, of the podcast Viva & Barnes: Law for the People. Founder of Barnes Law LLP, a Los Angeles–based law firm, Barnes gained public attention by representing perceived underdogs and for lawsuits involving constitutional issues.

== Early life and education ==
Barnes grew up in East Ridge, Tennessee, attended Grace Baptist Academy, and later received a scholarship to the McCallie School, a private all-male high school. Barnes' father died when he was a child.

He later attended Yale University for two years before transferring to the University of Tennessee at Chattanooga in 1994, citing Yale's elitism as the reason behind his decision to switch schools. Afterwards, Barnes graduated from the University of Wisconsin Law School.

== Career ==
Barnes was formerly a partner at the Bernhoft Law Firm. He later established his own practice, Barnes Law LLP, and is affiliated with Free America Law Center.

=== Notable cases ===
Barnes represented Ralph Nader in lawsuits regarding ballot access in Hawaii and Arizona for his 2004 presidential bid. The Hawaiian lawsuit was unsuccessful; however, the Arizona lawsuit was ultimately successful in Nader v. Brewer.

While with Bernhoft in 2008, Barnes served as one of actor Wesley Snipes' criminal defense lawyers. After a federal trial, a jury acquitted Snipes of conspiracy and felony tax evasion but convicted him on three out of six counts of misdemeanor failure to file income tax returns. Judge William Terrell Hodges imposed the maximum sentence of three consecutive one-year terms. The convictions and sentence were upheld on appeal, where Snipes was represented by other counsel.

Barnes was one of Alex Jones's defense attorneys in defamation lawsuits filed by an FBI agent and the parents of victims from the 2012 Sandy Hook massacre after Jones suggested that the shooting may have been staged. Pre-trial default judgments were entered against Jones in all cases, with jury trials later being held for the sole purpose of assessing damages.

In 2019 Barnes represented eight Covington High School students, excluding Nick Sandmann, in a lawsuit that was later dismissed.

Barnes was initially hired as part of Kyle Rittenhouse's defense team in his criminal trial following the 2020 Kenosha unrest shooting, but Barnes did not end up representing Rittenhouse at trial.

He represented bartender Dustin Hice in a sexual assault lawsuit against CNN anchor Don Lemon in 2021, based on a series of allegations that were later retracted.

In 2021 Barnes also represented Amy Cooper in the Central Park birdwatching incident for the misdemeanor charge of filing a false police report, a charge that was dismissed upon the motion of the prosecutor.

Barnes was hired in 2022 to represent Amish farmer Amos Miller of Miller's Organic Farm in the United States government's lawsuit against him for refusing to undergo USDA inspection of his products for religious reasons. In 2024 Barnes represented Amish farmer Reuben King during sentencing for his May 17, 2023 conviction for privately selling hunting guns from his collection without a license. King was facing 'up to five years in prison, a fine of up to $250,000, or both'. On Jan 23, 2024 the judge ruled King must pay a $35,000 fine and will spend three years on probation.

== Political views ==
Barnes is a self-described populist.

== Bet on Trump ==
In 2016, Barnes successfully wagered in European betting markets on Donald Trump being elected president of the United States, winning more than US$500,000.
