= Bogaert v. Land =

- Court: United States District Court for the Western District of Michigan
- Full case name: Rose Bogaert v. Terri Lynn Land, in her official capacity as Michigan Secretary of State
- Decided: August 27, 2008 (Preliminary Injunction)

Case history
- Appealed to: Sixth Circuit Court of Appeals (Dillon's appeal was not pursued)

Court membership
- Judge sitting: Judge Robert Holmes Bell

Case opinions
- Decision by: Judge Robert Holmes Bell

Keywords
- Recall election; Michigan law; First Amendment; Political speech; Preliminary injunction; MCL 168.957; Andy Dillon

Bogaert v. Land was a federal lawsuit filed on July 18, 2008, in the United States District Court for the Western District of Michigan by Rose Bogaert against Terri Lynn Land in Land's official capacity as Michigan Secretary of State. Bogaert claimed that her rights under the U.S. Constitution were violated by MCL 168.957, the Michigan statute that forbids recall signatures to be collected by people who live in a district other than the district of the legislator whose recall is sought. The action filed by Bogaert was a 42 U.S.C. 1983 civil rights action.

== Background ==
Andy Dillon was the speaker of the Michigan House and faced opposition due to his support of increased taxes. No state legislator had faced a recall vote since 1983.

Terri Lynn Land's office had determined that Bogaert's petition drive to place a question on the August 5, 2008, ballot to remove Dillon from office had fallen short by 776 signatures. 2,053 signatures that Land determined to be invalid were said to be because of the circulator's out-of-district status.

The lawsuit said that MCL 168.957 was unconstitutional and therefore should be disregarded as a proper basis for invalidating these signatures. If a federal judge agreed, the signatures could be reinstated and a recall election could be called.

Since it was too late for the recall question to go on the August ballot, the petition filed by Bogaert requested that the recall action be placed on the November 4, 2008, ballot. Dillon's name was expected to be on the ballot, as he sought his final term in office in the Michigan state legislature. If the lawsuit succeeded, Dillon's name would appear on the November ballot twice—once as a regular candidate and once as the subject of a recall election. If Dillon won the reelection, he could also simultaneously be recalled from the final two months of the term he was currently serving, which ended in January 2009.

== Procedural posture and actions ==
In the lawsuit, Bogaert asked for emergency consideration of a request for a preliminary injunction relative to the signatures filed in the Andy Dillon recall.

=== Judge rules Michigan restrictions unconstitutional ===
On August 27, 2008, United States District Judge Robert Holmes Bell issued a preliminary injunction ordering Land to re-examine the signatures without reference to statutory requirements prohibiting non-residents of Dillon's district from circulating petitions, and ordered that if sufficient signatures were found, then Land must place the recall against Representative Dillon on the November 4, 2008, general election ballot. In the ruling, Bell agreed with recall supporters that part of Michigan's law governing recall signature gathering was unconstitutional because it infringed on political speech rights protected in the First Amendment. He ruled that signatures from voters inside Dillon's district should be counted even if they were collected by petition circulators who lived outside the district or were not registered to vote. Under Michigan law, those signatures are not considered valid.

"The circulation of recall petitions is core political speech," Bell wrote, saying that recall organizers' First Amendment rights were "severely burdened" by state law.

Bell said the state and Dillon did not show how requiring recall petition circulators to be registered voters and district residents improves the integrity of recall petitions.

=== Dillon appeal for re-hearing rejected ===
Dillon appealed the court order on the grounds that the order did not leave him enough time before the September 8 deadline for printing ballots to challenge the signatures as fraudulent. Judge Bell denied Dillon's request for a re-hearing in his court, saying: "Representative Dillon was well aware of the tight schedule for challenging the recall petitions. Michigan law does not guarantee that state representatives will be given a second opportunity to challenge recall petitions in the event some portion of the state law is deemed to be unconstitutional. There was no impediment to his raising all of his challenges to the recall petitions by the June 2, 2008, deadline for submitting challenges. Representative Dillon effectively waived his right to challenge the authenticity of the signatures on the petitions circulated by non-residents and/or non-registered voters by failing to timely raise those challenges."

Michigan is in the Sixth Circuit, which is where Dillon would approach to file any additional appeals.

== Political result ==
The recall appeared on the ballot, but was defeated with 62.72% voting against it. Dillon also won 66.06% of the vote for reelection and remained speaker of the House.

== See also ==
- Citizens for Tax Reform v. Deters
- Yes on Term Limits v. Savage
- Nader v. Brewer
