= Nader v. Brewer =

Court decision regarding Arizona voting regulations

- Court: United States Court of Appeals for the Ninth Circuit
- Full case name: Ralph Nader; Donald N. Daien v. Janice Brewer
- Argued: April 15, 2008
- Decided: July 9, 2008
- Citation: 531 F.3d 1028

Case history
- Prior history: Plaintiffs' summary judgment granted by district court, June 9, 2006
- Subsequent history: Cert. denied, March 9, 2009

Court membership
- Judges sitting: Mary M. Schroeder, Richard R. Clifton, Consuelo M. Callahan

Case opinions
- Majority: Schroeder, joined by a unanimous court

Laws applied
- First Amendment

Nader v. Brewer, 531 F.3d 1028 (9th Cir. 2008) is a 2008 decision by the Ninth Circuit ruling that certain Arizona voting regulations were unconstitutional under the First Amendment to the United States Constitution.

The original lawsuit was filed by Robert Barnes on behalf of Ralph Nader, Peter Camejo, Donald N. Daien, and Kendle H. Greenlee against Jan Brewer in her official capacity as Secretary of State of Arizona.

The Supreme Court of the United States declined to hear an appeal on March 9, 2009.

== Background ==
The plaintiffs challenged two provisions of Arizona's ballot laws:

- Arizona's residency requirement for petition circulators;
- Arizona's June deadline for submitting signatures for independent presidential candidates. Under Anderson v. Celebrezze, the Nader team believed the June deadline was unconstitutionally early.

The United States Court of Appeals for the Ninth Circuit heard the case on April 15, 2008, and issued its 3-0 ruling on July 9, 2008. Judge Mary M. Schroeder wrote the opinion of the court, holding that both Arizona laws were not narrowly tailored to meet a compelling state interest, and were therefore unconstitutional.

== Procedural posture ==
=== Appeal to the Supreme Court ===
The day the 9th Circuit released the decision, Arizona Secretary of State Jan Brewer announced that she disagreed with it and intended to ask the U.S. Supreme Court to review the 9th circuit's decision particularly as concerns Arizona's early filing deadline. On November 13, Arizona filed its brief requesting a hearing with the U.S. top court. In early December 2008, the Montana Attorney General's office announced that it intended to file an amicus curiae brief on the side of the Arizona law that the 9th circuit invalidated.

Thirteen states, including Alabama, Alaska, Colorado, Delaware, Florida, Idaho, Michigan, Montana, Ohio, Oklahoma, South Dakota and Wyoming submitted an amicus curiae brief to the court in December 2008, asking the Court to hear Arizona's appeal. The brief was primarily written by the Montana Attorney General's office.

On February 5, 2009, Nader's attorneys filed their response brief with the U.S. Supreme Court.

== Ninth Circuit opinion ==
In the decision, the Ninth Circuit panel wrote:

The residency requirement nevertheless excludes from eligibility all persons who support the candidate but who, like Nader, live outside the state. Such a restriction creates a severe burden on Nader and his out-of-state supporters' speech, voting and associational rights.

Judge Schroeder also wrote in the decision that Arizona "did not meet its burden of showing that this residency requirement is narrowly tailored to further the state's compelling interest in preventing fraud."

Although the residency requirement at issue related to collecting signatures for independent presidential candidates, in its decision, the court discussed residency requirements for initiative circulators and candidate circulators as if the issues in both were identical.

Of significant interest is what the Ninth Circuit decision says about the decisions of other courts. The last time a federal court upheld a residency requirement was in 2001, in the case of Initiative & Referendum Institute v. Jaeger, when the Eight Circuit gave its blessing to North Dakota's residency requirement for initiative circulators. Judge Schroeder's Ninth Circuit ruling has this to say about Jaeger:

A brief Eighth Circuit opinion came to the opposite conclusion and upheld a residency requirement for initiative-petition circulators. See Initiative & Referendum Institute v. Jaeger. Krislov had been decided a few months earlier, but Jaeger did not cite it. The Tenth Circuit in Chandler did cite Jaeger and disagreed with it. We do not find Jaeger persuasive.

=== Arizona's law ===
In 1993, Arizona moved its independent petition deadline from September to June. In 2004, in his presidential bid, Nader tried to meet the Arizona deadline, but he came up 550 signatures short.

Denied a spot on the 2004 Arizona ballot, Nader filed a lawsuit in federal court seeking injunctive relief. This was denied not on the merits, which were not addressed, but on the grounds that the lawsuit, which was filed on August 16, 2004, was filed too late.

=== Least restrictive alternative ===
Judge Consuelo Callahan is reported to have said that restriction can only be upheld if it necessary for a compelling state interest (strict scrutiny), indicating that it was unlikely that the lower court had applied a strict scrutiny standard. Nader's attorney, Robert Barnes, argued that Arizona's interest in locating a petitioner for the legal service of a subpoena after the petition drive is over can be satisfied by the less restrictive solution of requiring circulators to agree to testify if needed. This is a less restrictive option than making it illegal for non-residents to solicit signatures.

=== Independent candidates ===
Arizona moved the petition deadline for independent presidential candidates from September to June in 1993. Since that time, none have succeeded in qualifying for the ballot. Judge Clifton is reported to have found this fact significant.

According to Winger,

The attorney for the state noted that eleven independent candidates have qualified in Arizona since 1993, but Judge Clifton asked how many of them were running for a district or county office, for which (as he noted) far fewer signatures are required. The attorney for the state was unable to give any examples of a statewide independent (for office other than president) who has qualified since 1993.

=== Does Prete apply? ===
Judge Mary Schroeder asked if the restrictions imposed on Oregon circulations and upheld by the Ninth Circuit in Prete v. Bradbury had relevance here. Nader's attorney noted that Oregon's law doesn't prevent anyone from circulating petitions, as opposed to the Arizona law under review. Barnes also pointed out that in Prete, the plaintiffs failed to assemble factual evidence to show that the Oregon law was burdensome on the initiative process, whereas in the present case, Nader was presenting evidence of the burden of the law being challenged (for example, that no independent presidential candidates had made the Arizona ballot in the 14 years since the law was enacted).

=== Does the law prevent fraud? ===
According to Winger:

Judge Clifton asked if anyone had been prosecuted for fraud in the Arizona Nader petition, and the attorney in the state responded, "No, not in Arizona." However, she mentioned that there had been other petitions in Arizona involving fraud. Judge Clifton expressed the idea that sometimes a state uses fraud as a rationalization.

== See also ==
- Citizens for Tax Reform v. Deters
- Bogaert v. Land
- Yes on Term Limits v. Savage
