= Yes on Term Limits v. Savage =

U.S. legal case

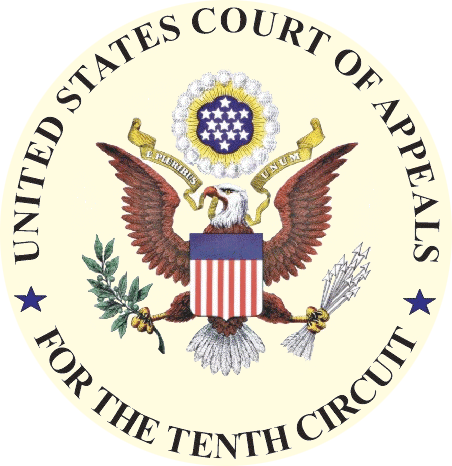
- Court: United States Court of Appeals for the Tenth Circuit
- Full case name: Yes on Term Limits, Inc., et al. v. M. Susan Savage, individually and in her official capacity as Oklahoma Secretary of State, et al.
- Decided: December 18, 2008
- Citation: 550 F.3d 1023

Case history
- Prior history: No. 5:07-cv-00680, 2007 WL 2670178 (W.D. Okla. Sept. 7, 2007)

Court membership
- Judges sitting: Michael R. Murphy, Monroe G. McKay, Michael W. McConnell

Case opinions
- Majority: Murphy, joined by unanimous

Laws applied
- U.S. Const., amend. I

Yes on Term Limits v. Savage (shortened YOTL v. Savage), 550 F.3d 1023 (10th Cir. 2008), is a case in which challenged Oklahoma's residency requirements for petition circulators. In 2007, the organization Oklahoma Yes on Term Limits filed a federal lawsuit against Oklahoma Secretary of State Susan Savage on First Amendment grounds. At the time, Oklahoma required petition circulators to be a state resident which it argued was "narrowly tailored" to uphold the integrity of the petitioning process in the state.

Judge Tim Leonard of the United States District Court for the Western District of Oklahoma initially ruled in favor of the state of Oklahoma, but this decision was appealed to the United States Court of Appeals for the Tenth Circuit. On December 18, 2008, a three-judge panel unanimously decided the case in favor of Oklahoma Yes on Term Limits while citing violations of the First Amendment and ruling that Oklahoma's law was not narrowly tailored.

While Oklahoma Attorney General Drew Edmondson stated his intent to appeal the decision further, the Tenth Circuit denied his request to rehear the case. As a result, a day later Edmondson's office announced on January 22, 2009 that it would drop the charges against Paul Jacob, Susan Johnson and Rick Carpenter who were prosecuted under the challenged law.

== History and overview ==
On December 18, 2008, a three-judge panel of the United States Court of Appeals for the Tenth Circuit issued a unanimous decision in the case, saying that Oklahoma's residency restriction is an unconstitutional violation of core First Amendment speech rights. The decision of the Tenth Circuit overturned a lower federal court decision.

The Tenth Circuit's decision in YOTL attracted notice because:

- It is the third federal circuit court decision in 2008 that invalidates a state residency requirement. The Sixth Circuit said that Michigan's residency requirement is unconstitutional in Bogaert v. Land in August 2008 and the Ninth Circuit said that Arizona's residency requirement is unconstitutional in Nader v. Brewer in July 2008.
- The decision undercut Drew Edmondson's rationale for criminally prosecuting the Oklahoma 3 for allegedly violating Oklahoma's residency requirement in a 2005 petition drive.,

Oklahoma Attorney General Drew Edmondson had said that he plans to appeal the decision in YOTL to either the full Tenth circuit or to the U.S. Supreme Court. His office says that they plan to continue their prosecution of Paul Jacob, Susan Johnson and Rick Carpenter. Earlier in 2008, Edmondson told Oklahoma City's Journal Record, "If the courts determine that the state's process violates the First Amendment, so be it. Until that time, our law will be enforced.",

On January 21, 2009, the Tenth Circuit announced that it was rejecting Edmondson's request that it rehear the case. The state had asked for an en banc rehearing, but no judge agreed to rehear the case.

Drew Edmondson then announced on January 22 that he was dropping his charges against Paul Jacob, Susan Johnson and Rick Carpenter for allegedly violating the unconstitutional law, saying that the 1969 law under which he was prosecuting them was "no longer enforceable".

== Background ==
YOTL was filed in August 2007 in the United States District Court for the Western District of Oklahoma by Oklahoma Yes on Term Limits against Susan Savage, the Oklahoma Secretary of State. The plaintiffs alleged that the part of Oklahoma's I&R law requiring that petition circulators be residents of Oklahoma was an unconstitutional infringement of the first amendment rights of the initiative proponents and of initiative circulators. The group said that its ability to qualify an initiative petition to put a term limits amendment on the Oklahoma ballot was unconstitutionally restricted by the state's rules governing petition circulators.

Judge Tim Leonard of the Western District disagreed, ruling against the plaintiffs on September 7, 2007. An appeal to the ruling was filed with the United States Court of Appeals for the Tenth Circuit.

Yes on Term Limits, represented by Todd Graves on behalf of the Center for Competitive Politics, filed its final appeal brief on January 7, 2008. Drew Edmondson filed his response brief on February 11, and Yes on Term Limits subsequently filed its final reply brief on February 28. Two amicus briefs were filed in the case, both supporting the views of "Yes on Term Limits". The Institute for Justice filed one, as did the American Civil Rights Coalition.

== Arguments in the case ==
As with other legal challenges to residency requirements, what is at issue in the case is whether Oklahoma's residency requirement is "narrowly tailored" to uphold the integrity of the petitioning process in the state, or whether its provisions are an overly broad infringement on the First Amendment.

=== Oklahoma's position ===
Drew Edmondson, the Oklahoma Attorney General, argued on behalf of the State of Oklahoma that the current residency requirements are narrowly tailored. The brief said, "Oklahoma has a compelling interest in maintaining the integrity, reliability and efficiency of its system of direct democracy and the protest procedures designed to police the system. Oklahoma also has the power to limit self-governance to members of its own political community. The residency requirement is narrowly tailored to these interests."

In the brief, Edmondson argued that "resident circulators can be easily located and compelled to testify; whereas nonresident circulators will most likely never be located and cannot be compelled to testify" in the event of challenges to signatures.

=== "Yes on Term Limits" position ===
"Phantom interstate menance"

The January brief of YTL started out, "Oklahoma's blanket ban on nonresident petition circulators offends the First Amendment and the structure of the federal union. It is directed at a phantom interstate menace: the presumed endemic dishonesty of nonresidents who wish to travel to Oklahoma to associate with and speak for local citizens whose own voices for political change are otherwise too faint or dispersed. These are the citizens for whom many states, in a wave of populism, preserved the right to initiative, referendum, and recall. They have no eloquent champions in the press, powerful sponsors among local political elites, or brigades of party or union supporters. They cannot grasp traditional republican levers which have been co-opted by the powers that be; their reform would be stifled without a direct appeal to thinking voters."

"Closes Oklahoma to free exchange of ideas"

In its amicus brief, the Institute for Justice said that Oklahoma's ban on non-resident signature-gathering "closes Oklahoma to the free exchange of ideas that is part of an out-of-stater's efforts to convince an Oklahoma voter to sign a petition."

"Does not prevent fraud"

The amicus brief by the American Civil Rights Coalition responded to the assertion that a ban on non-resident circulators is effective at limiting fraud in the initiative process. "Limiting circulators to Oklahoma residents simply limits the number of people who can commit fraud, it does not prevent it in any serious way", adding, "Moreover, if an out-of-state circulator violates some rule by failing to register with the state or failing to sign an affidavit…the narrowly tailored remedy is to not count the affected signatures, not preclude all out-of-state circulators."

"Fabricating an unwieldy process"

In its final reply brief on February 28, YTL argued, "Defendants claim without proof that there is something peculiarly poisonous about nonresidents. Defendants also claim that Oklahoma has absolute dominion over petition circulation because each Oklahoma petition circulator has somehow been commandeered as an agent of the state, holding official appointments for which Defendants now have a new name: 'verifiers.' But by fabricating an unwieldy process to challenge signatures, Oklahoma cannot dislodge petition circulation from the zenith of First Amendment protection, a status this mode of expression enjoys under Meyer, Buckley, and their progeny."

The final brief contested the assertion by Edmondson that the challenged residency requirement was narrowly tailored, claiming instead, "...a blanket ban on circulation is not the narrow tailoring required by the First Amendment. Short of a ban, Oklahoma has a range of less restrictive options for addressing any specific problem it can prove has infected its petitioning process. Wholesale abrogation of nonresident circulation does not comport with the First Amendment."

== See also ==
- Citizens for Tax Reform v. Deters
- Bogaert v. Land
- Nader v. Brewer
