= Green Party of Oklahoma =

- Founded: 1990s
- Ideology: Green politics
- Political position: Left-wing
- National affiliation: Green Party of the United States
- Colors
- Statewide Executive Offices: 0 / 12
- Seats in the Oklahoma Senate: 0 / 48
- Seats in the Oklahoma House of Representatives: 0 / 101
- Seats in the United States Senate: 0 / 2
- Seats in the United States House of Representatives: 0 / 5
- Chiefs of the Five Tribes: 0 / 5
- Osage Executives: 0 / 2

Website
- Green Party of Oklahoma

The Green Party of Oklahoma is a political party in the U.S. state of Oklahoma. It was formed in 2002 through a gradual coalition of various state green groups and received its accreditation from the Green Party of the United States (GPUS) in May 2005. Its stated aims are a commitment to environmentalism, non-violence, social justice, and grassroots democracy.

The party has been active in organizing around issues of peace, the death penalty, minority language rights, gay rights, rural sustainability, and academic freedom. The party has also worked with the Oklahoma Libertarian Party and the Oklahoma Constitution Party in seeking to reform Oklahoma's restrictive ballot access laws. In 2000, the party gathered nomination signatures to place Ralph Nader on the Oklahoma Presidential ballot but was unable to collect a sufficient amount. In 2016, the Green Party of Oklahoma broke with the GPUS when it endorsed Senator Bernie Sanders as president (in the Democratic Party primary). Despite endorsing Sanders (a non-Green Party candidate), the Green Party of Oklahoma remained affiliated with the national Green Party.

== History ==
=== 1990s ===
The state party's original roots are not certain, but the best known history is that there were two local Green Party chapters active in the late 1990s, the Central Oklahoma Green Party (which later split into the Oklahoma County Green Party and the Cleveland County Green Party) and the Green Country Green Party (representing the Tulsa metropolitan area and Northeastern Oklahoma).

Prior to the formation of a statewide party, Green Party members in Oklahoma (through statewide nominating conventions) sent delegates to the national Green Party nominating conventions in 1996. Greens statewide also cooperated in the publication of The Greenleaf (a state Green Party newspaper).

=== 2000s ===
Oklahoma Greens sent delegates to the national Green Party nominating convention in 2000 (through a statewide nominating convention, since there was not yet an organized state Green Party organization). Oklahoma Greens unsuccessfully petitioned to place Ralph Nader on the Oklahoma Presidential ballot and after failed litigation by the national Green Party, Oklahoma Greens protested his exclusion from the state's Presidential ballot.

In 2002, the local chapters called for the founding convention of the Green Party of Oklahoma, which was held at the Cleveland County Fairgrounds in Norman on November 16, 2002. At this convention the party elected the following members to the state executive board: Rachel Jackson & Ben Alpers as co-chairs, Danelle as Secretary, Doug Vincent as Treasurer, and James M. Branum, Alice Anderton, and Brian Wright as members at large. (shortly after this convention Danelle resigned as Secretary and Belinda Silverstar was selected by the executive committee to serve in her place).

Also in 2002 the party circulated a candidate questionnaire to all of the statewide candidates for Oklahoma political office that year. Following the election a controversy arose over candidate Brad Henry's statements regarding the death penalty, in which the governor denied that he had authorized his statement in favor of a death penalty moratorium to the Green Party. (This was discussed by several statewide media outlets.)

The second state convention was held at Dwight Mission near Vian in May 2003 (where the party drafted its state platform), and the third state convention was held in the spring of 2004 at the Newcastle Senior Citizens Center in Newcastle, OK (at this convention Branum succeeded Alpers as co-chair, and Micah Atkins was elected to fill the vacancy left by Branum's change in position. The party also elected Alpers, Branum, Silverstar, and Curtis Andrew Beckwith to represent the state at the GPUS national convention in the summer of 2004). Later in 2004, Brian Wright resigned his position and Serena Blaiz was chosen to serve in his place. {citation needed}

Later in 2004, the state party held a "protest petition drive" (gathering a nominal number of signatures as a form of protest) to place GPUS presidential nominee David Cobb on the Oklahoma Presidential ballot. Following this, the party joined with other members of the OBAR coalition in calling for Oklahoma voters to cast a blank ballot for President as part of a so-called "None of the Above" Presidential campaign.

The fourth state convention was held at the campgrounds of the Chickasaw National Recreation Area in Sulphur, OK in 2005. The convention was notable for its adoption of the so-called "Radical Proposal", a bylaws revision that abolished the current state Executive Committee and replaced it with a state Cooperative Council, composed of voting representatives from each of the local chapters, as well as non-voting membership by GPOK members who wish to participate. The party now has a Facilitator who manages the flow of discussion at meetings but no longer has the executive position of Co-chair.

Also in 2005, the state party was accredited as a state Green Party by the Green Party of the US (see Green Party US Voting Page (external link)) and hosted the Annual meeting of the Green Party's national committee in Tulsa.

The fifth annual state convention was held in Tulsa in 2006. Major business of the convention included the endorsement of the party's first candidate for the State House, James M. Branum who ran to represent State House District #99 in northeast Oklahoma City as an Independent. He was endorsed by the local and state Green parties as their first candidate for public office in Oklahoma. He received 306 votes, or 4.81% of the votes cast in the three-way race. Also in 2006, Bob Waldrop was endorsed by the Oklahoma County Green Party in his non-partisan campaign for Oklahoma City mayor.

In 2006, The state party also organized an Earth Day celebration in Muskogee, Oklahoma and called for a boycott of Starbucks in solidarity with the National Lawyers Guild and other groups protesting the firing of workers who were members of the Industrial Workers of the World union.

In 2007, the party held its Sixth annual convention in Stroud, Oklahoma at the historic Rock Cafe on old Route 66. The speaker at this convention was Sean Hough, a worker from the Libertarian Party who had come to work with Oklahomans for Ballot Access Reform. Also in 2007, the Oklahoma County local chapter endorsed Fannie Bates in her run as a Democrat for Oklahoma County Commissioner.

Stroud also hosted the Seventh Annual convention in 2008. The party returned to its birthplace in Norman for its Eighth convention (in 2009).

=== 2010s ===
The Ninth Annual Convention was held in Norman in 2010, where the party endorsed Edward A. Shadid in his unsuccessful race for the Oklahoma State House. The following year, Shadid won a non-partisan seat on the Oklahoma City Council.

The struggle for ballot access reform continued in 2010 with the party receiving some media attention for its cooperative efforts with other third parties to challenge state law.

There was no convention held in 2011, but the party held its Tenth annual convention in Stroud in 2012. Also in 2012, the Oklahoma Greens joined with other third parties to launch another round of litigation challenging Oklahoma's restrictive ballot access laws.

The Oklahoma Greens were largely inactive during 2013-2015 with no state conventions being held.

In 2016, the Green Party of Oklahoma controversially endorsed Senator Bernie Sanders for the Democratic nominee for President of the United States but did not endorse any candidate on the Oklahoma general election ballot for President since GPUS nominee Jill Stein was not on the ballot due to Oklahoma's restrictive ballot access laws (as well as the failure of litigation brought by Presidential nominee Stein.)

=== 2020s ===
In July 2020 the GPOK held its 12th state convention via zoom due to the COVID pandemic, electing delegates to represent Oklahoma Greens at the GPUS Presidential Nominating Convention. Following the convention, the party held a presidential preference poll in which GPOK members used ranked choice voting to decide how Oklahoma's delegates will be bound during the first round of voting at convention. The voting results was as follows:

2020 Presidential Preference Poll
Candidate	Percentage of Support	Number of Delegate Votes Allocated
Dario Hunter	34.48%	1
Howie Hawkins	28.73%	1
None of the Above/Uncommitted	18.54%	0.5
David Rolde	17.24%	0.5

The party has not been active since the July 2020 convention.

== Local chapters ==
The party in the past has had local chapters in the OKC metro, Tulsa metro and in several smaller communities in Oklahoma, as well as the Rural Greens (a chapter that represents at-large members).

== Past and current areas of concern ==
The state party has been active in organizing on the issues of environmental sustainability, peace, anti-death penalty, minority language rights, LGBTQ equality, rural sustainability and academic freedom. The party has also worked with the Oklahoma Libertarian Party and the Oklahoma Constitution Party in seeking to reform Oklahoma's restrictive ballot access laws through the Oklahomans for Ballot Access Reform coalition (OBAR).
