= Paul Jacob =

American activist

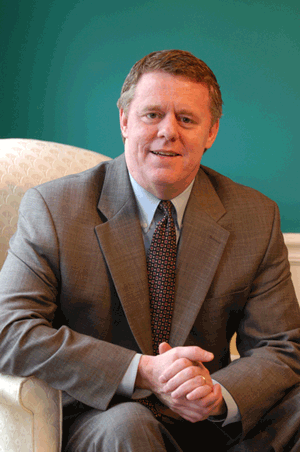
Paul Jacob

Paul Jacob (born 1960) is an American activist, organizer, and advocate for legislative term limits, initiative and veto referendum rights, and limited government in the United States. He writes a weekly column for Townhall.com and his short radio commentary feature, "Common Sense," is syndicated by the Citizens in Charge Foundation on over 120 radio stations around the U.S. He has held positions with the U.S. Libertarian Party, U.S. Term Limits, Americans for Limited Government, the Citizens in Charge Foundation and the Sam Adams Alliance.

== Political philosophy ==
Because Jacob emphasizes institutional and procedural reforms—most notable being ballot initiative and referendum rights and legislative term limits—his libertarian philosophy appears more centrist than either left-libertarianism or rightist. Though often writing from a background of cultural conservatism, his frequent criticisms of what he regards as Republican Party "excesses" distances his writing from that of most other columnists usually defined as "on the right". Examples of Jacob's views can be read in his columns on Townhall.com, as well as in his "Common Sense" commentaries. Frequent targets of his commentary include Republicans known for their pork barrel spending, such as Senator Ted Stevens, and both Democrats and Republicans who support campaign spending regulations, such as Senators Russ Feingold and John McCain. Paul Jacob has repeatedly argued that the McCain-Feingold law, and all similar campaign finance reform measures, are clear violations of the First Amendment.

== Draft resistance ==
Two bumper stickers feature slogans from different periods of Jacob's political activism.

Jacob first came to political prominence in the early 1980s as a draft registration resister. His crusade against forced military service and for the all-volunteer army was featured in Rolling Stone magazine. In 1985, after being convicted of violating the Selective Service Act, he served five and a half months in federal prison, making him one of only nine American draft resisters imprisoned since the Vietnam War. During the trial, Congressman Ron Paul testified on his behalf.

Jacob's argument against the draft can be found in his brief essay titled "The Draft is Slavery," originally published as one of several "afterwords" to J. Neil Schulman's science fiction novel The Rainbow Cadenza.

== Support for legislative term limits ==
Paul Jacob, during oral arguments of U.S. Term Limits v. Thornton (1994)

Primarily known as a leader of the term limits movement, Jacob ran U.S. Term Limits, the nation's most active term limits lobby, from its inception in 1992 until 1999, becoming the movement's leading voice. Jacob helped citizens in 23 states place limits on their congressional delegations, prompting columnist Robert Novak to call him "the most hated man in Washington." But on May 22, 1995, those state-imposed congressional term limits, encompassing nearly half the U.S. Congress, were struck down by the Supreme Court of the United States in the case of U.S. Term Limits v. Thornton. Today, 15 state legislatures, 36 governors and thousands of local officials, including those in nine of the country's ten largest cities, are under term limits. Jacob held several positions with U.S. Term Limits (including national director, senior fellow, and president), and currently serves on the organization's Board of Directors.

== Activities in the Libertarian Party ==
Jacob served on the National Committee of the Libertarian Party and then in 1987 and 1988 as the party's national director. In 1988, he worked to put Ron Paul on the ballot for president as a Libertarian, winning ballot access in 47 states, Washington, D.C., and Guam.

== Citizens in Charge & Citizens in Charge Foundation ==
In 2001, Jacob started Citizens in Charge, a 501(c)(4) advocacy group dedicated to protecting the voter initiative process where it exists and expanding it to more states and localities. Between 2002 and 2004, CIC worked closely with Let Minnesota Vote in an unsuccessful effort to bring statewide initiative & referendum to Minnesota. CIC provided much of the funding for voter issue education in the state's 2002 legislative elections, through direct mail, television ads and radio spots. In those elections, five incumbent state senators were defeated by pro-initiative challengers, but the Democratic-Farmer-Labor Party retained control of the state senate and continued to block a vote of the people on statewide initiative. CIC also led a 2004 lobbying effort against restrictions on the initiative in Florida, working with the Florida Initiative League and later with Hands Off Florida. In 2005, Citizens in Charge was instrumental in blocking a number of proposed legislative restrictions to the initiative process in Nevada. Jacob serves as president of the organization.

Jacob is also founder and president of the Citizens in Charge Foundation, which works to educate the public, opinion leaders, and elected officials on the initiative and referendum process. The Foundation currently produces his radio and internet commentary program Common Sense.

== The Sam Adams Alliance ==
Jacob was a senior advisor at the Sam Adams Alliance from 2007–2008. Paul acted as a spokesperson for Sam Adams, and the Alliance produced his daily "Common Sense".

== 2007 indictment in Oklahoma ==
=== Ballot initiative petition drive ===
In 2005 and 2006, Jacob worked with an Oklahoma group, Oklahomans in Action, to place on the ballot an initiative, Stop Overspending, which is one of several measures run in different states known as the Taxpayer Bill of Rights, or TaBOR. Among the paid petitioners used were some that had come to Oklahoma from other states to work on the drive. On October 2, 2007, Jacob was formally indicted in Oklahoma on a charge of conspiracy to defraud the state on the matter of hiring out-of-state petitioners. Jacob claims the petition's organizers had sought, and received, approval for this from the Oklahoma Secretary of State. A conviction would have carried a maximum fine of $25,000, and the maximum jail sentence of ten years in prison. Jacob was indicted with two others in the case, and each pleaded not guilty. A website—FreePaulJacob.com—was put up in Jacob's defense.

=== Criticism of indictment ===
The indictment drew criticism from around the state and all over the country for being politically motivated. 2008 independent presidential candidate Ralph Nader referred to the laws such as the one Jacob was charged with breaking as "Jim Crow laws," adding, "We've seen this before against African Americans. The Wall Street Journal editorialized against the prosecution twice, calling it "bizarre", and Steve Forbes asked the question "Has North Korea Annexed Oklahoma?".

=== Law struck down and charges dropped ===
On December 18, 2008 the Tenth Circuit Court of Appeals struck down the underlying Oklahoma law that barred out of state petition circulators, noting that it was in violation of the First Amendment . Oklahoma Attorney General Drew Edmondson appealed the decision on behalf of Secretary of State Susan Savage. On January 21, 2009 the Tenth Circuit court denied the state's appeal, effectively ending the case. The Attorney General's office dismissed the charges against Jacob and the other defendants, with Edmondson saying "The statute under which these defendants were charged has been declared unconstitutional, and the appellate process is complete...The statute is no longer enforceable."

== See also ==
- Mike Gravel
- Dane Waters
- Initiative & Referendum Institute
