= Citizens for Tax Reform v. Deters =

Appeals court case in the United States

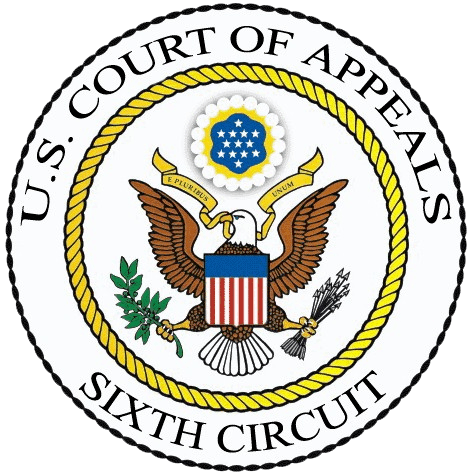
- Court: United States Court of Appeals for the Sixth Circuit
- Full case name: Citizens for Tax Reform and Jeffrey P. Ledbetter v. Joseph Deters, et al.
- Argued: November 30, 2007
- Decided: March 5, 2008
- Citation: 518 F.3d 375

Case history
- Prior history: 462 F. Supp. 2d 827 (S.D. Ohio 2006)
- Subsequent history: Cert. denied

Court membership
- Judges sitting: Eugene Edward Siler Jr., Julia Smith Gibbons, David McKeague

Case opinions
- Majority: McKeague, joined by a unanimous court

Laws applied
- U.S. Const. amend. I Ohio Code § 3599.111

Citizens for Tax Reform v. Deters, 518 F.3d 375 (6th Cir. 2008), was a decision that overturned an Ohio statute that made it a felony to pay petitioners by the signature.

== Background ==
The law at issue, Ohio Revised Code § 3599.111, went into effect on March 31, 2005.

The case arose out of an attempt of Citizens for Tax Reform (CTR), an Ohio political advocacy group, to quality a citizen initiative for the 2005 general election ballot in that state. They contracted with a professional petition drive management company to pay $1.70 per signature for 450,000 signatures. This contract was entered into prior to the contested law taking effect. Once the law took effect, the petition drive management company notified CTR that they could no longer collect signatures at the specified rate and that, indeed, they would require an additional $300,000 to complete the drive.

On April 1, 2005, CTR filed a federal lawsuit in the United States District Court for the Southern District of Ohio seeking to overturn Ohio statute ORC 3599.111, which forbids paying petitioners by the signature. The law went into effect on March 31, 2005.

On March 19, 2005, Judge Sandra Beckwith issued a Temporary Restraining Order (TRO) against the state of Ohio, enjoining the enforcement of the state's ban on payment-per-signature. The TRO was extended multiple times, until the hearing before Judge Dlott, at which time Dlott invalidated Ohio's law as unconstitutional.

=== State of Ohio arguments ===
In unsuccessfully making its case, the government of Ohio relied on evidence of fraud from the 2004 petition drive that took place in Ohio to qualify Ralph Nader for the ballot. Judge Dlott criticized this evidence as not proving that the fraud was caused by the method of paying circulators by the signature.

Judge Dlott also rejected the value of evidence presented in the case by John Lindback, the Director of the Election Division for the Oregon Secretary of State. Judge Dlott found that the materials presented by Lindback are "almost devoid of factual findings" and overall found that the Lindback exhibits "are not probative even to the extent that they are admissible".

== Procedural posture and actions ==
United States District Court Judge Susan Dlott found that Ohio's law was an unconstitutional abridgment of the First Amendment to the United States Constitution and enjoined the state from enforcing it.

The defendants in the case, Joseph Deters and Matthias Heck, were named in their official capacities as enforcers of the law. Deters was the prosecuting attorney for Hamilton County, Ohio and Heck was the prosecuting attorney for Montgomery County, Ohio.

In the district court's decision, Judge Dlott relied on evidence presented by professional signature-gathering companies that indicated a prohibition on "per-signature" compensation would increase the costs and the time associated with obtaining the number of signatures required to qualify for the ballot. The Court also found that the State's evidence of fraud in certain petition efforts did not establish the fraud was caused by the method of payment to circulators. Thus, the Court held that the statute did not justify the burden placed on the initiative proponents' core political speech rights.

== Appeal ==
Dlott's decision was appealed by the Ohio Secretary of State to the United States Court of Appeals for the Sixth Circuit. On March 5, 2008, a three judge panel of the Sixth Circuit Court of Appeals unanimously upheld the district court ruling to strike Ohio's law banning per-signature payments. Judge David McKeague wrote:

As with the law in general,^{1} the First Amendment is a jealous mistress. It enables the people to exchange ideas (popular and unpopular alike), to assemble with the hope of changing minds, and to alter or preserve how we govern ourselves. But in return, it demands that sometimes seemingly reasonable measures enacted by our governments give way.

On August 1, 2008, the Solicitor General of Ohio asked the U.S. Supreme Court to hear an appeal of the decision. On November 17, 2008, the United States Supreme Court announced that it was declining to hear Ohio's appeal.

== See also ==
- McIntyre v. Ohio Elections Commission
- Bogaert v. Land
- Yes on Term Limits v. Savage
- Nader v. Brewer
